= Second siege of Anandpur =

Battle in northern India

- Part of the Mughal-Sikh Wars and Hill States-Sikh Wars
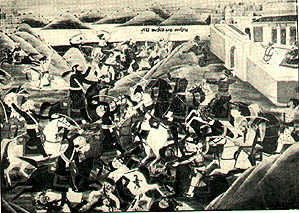
- 19th century painting depicting the battle of Anandpur
Date	May – 19 December 1704
Location	Anandpur
Result	Mughal and Hill Raja victory

Belligerents
Khalsa (Sikhs)	Mughal Empire; Alliance of 22 Hill Rajas

Commanders and leaders
Guru Gobind Singh supreme general and in charge of Anandgarh Udai Singh in charge of Fatehgarh; Mohkam Singh in charge of Holgarh; Ajit Singh in charge of Kesgarh; Jujhar Singh, Nahar Singh and Sher Singh in charge of Lohgarh; Alam Singh Nachna in charge of Agampur (executed); Daya Singh in charge of Northern Anandpur	Aurangzeb; Wazir Khan; Zaberdast Khan; Dilwaar Khan; Ajmer Chand; Bhim Chand; Bhup Chand

Strength
500 hundred in each of the five forts of Anandpur and 500 hundred in reserve; Total of 3,000–10,000; 2 cannons in Anandgarh	100,000

The second siege of Anandpur (anadapura dī ghērābadī), also known as the second battle of Anandpur (1704) (Note: Called 2nd Anandpur by Tony Jacques) (anadapura dī dūjī laṛā'ī sāla satārāṁ sau cāra), was a siege at Anandpur, between Sikhs and the Mughal governors, dispatched by Aurangzeb, Wazir Khan, Dilwaar Kahn and Zaberdast Khan, and aided by the vassal Rajas of the Sivalik Hills which lasted from May 1704 to 19 December 1704.

== Background ==
The Hill Rajas were concerned about Guru Gobind Singh's rising power and influence in their region, along with dislike for the Sikh movement. In addition, the Hill Rajas were frustrated by the raids on their villages by the Sikhs from Anandpur who sought to acquire supplies, provisions, and cash. According to Indubhusan Banerjee, the hill rajas and the Guru maintained harmony after the Raja of Kahlur had conceded villages adjacent to Anandpur, however with the proliferation of the Sikhs in Anandpur and the Guru's pursuit of expanding his territory, the Khalsa began to encroach upon the hill rajas' territory to coerce villagers for goods.

Eventually they sent a petition to the Mughal Emperor Aurangzeb and launched a joint attack with the Mughals in 1700 which failed. Afterwards they besieged Anadpur without Mughal assistance which also failed. The Rajas decided to plan with the Mughals again and launched multiple joint attacks, all of which failed.

== Siege ==
News of all the defeats reached Aurangzeb, who was furious. He gave orders that the Guru and all of his followers should be killed. In May 1704, governors of Sirhind, Lahore, and Kashmir Wazir Khan, Zaberdast Khan, and Dilwaar Khan were sent by the Mughal Emperor Aurangzeb, joined by the Hill Rajas, and besieged Anandpur in an attempt to remove the Guru and his followers. Aurangzeb also dispatched the Governor of Peshwar to help lay siege. All were ordered to bring their full army to Anandpur. They were joined by the Hill Rajas consisting of the rulers of Kahlur, Kangra, Jaswan, Mandi, Kullu, Nalagarh, Kaithal, Nurpur, Chamba, Jammu, Busaher, Dhadwa, Darauli, Bijarwal, and Garhwal.

Guru Gobind Singh divided his force into 500 men per each of the 5 forts. Anandgarh was under Guru Gobind Singh's charge. Fatehgarh was commanded by Uday Singh, Holgarh was commanded by Mohkam Singh, Ajit Singh commanded Kesgarh, and Jujhar Singh held Lohgarh. Guru Gobind Singh also placed 2 cannons in Anandgarh named the tigress and victory-deceleration. When used they would cause havoc on the attacking forces.

The army of the Guru kept the Mughals and hillmen at bay but being surrounded by heavy odds, took refuge in Anandpur fort, where they were besieged for many months, with all supplies and communications cut off. Ajmer Chand alongside the Qazis offered an oath to safe passage if the Guru evacuated Anandpur, so the Guru sent out envoys of treasure which was looted but turned out to be all the cities rubbish. A month later Emperor Aurangzeb sent a written assurance by promising on the Quran, whereas Hill Rajas swore by the name of the cow, with the safety of all Sikhs if the Guru decided to evacuate the fort, and after a long drawn out siege, Gobind Singh and his followers, facing starvation, capitulated in return for safe passage (particularly Mata Gujri and the Chali Mukte, coinciding Gobind Singh advice to stay), but the Sikhs were treacherously attacked at the Sarsa River, with all assurances and solemn oaths betrayed by the Mughals and Hill Rajas.

== Legacy ==
According to Satnam Singh, the conflict had major repercussions for the Sikhs, as they had to abandon Anandpur. With this evacuation, a large amount of literature that had been produced by the guru's Kavi Darbar was lost. Furthermore, the Saka Sirhind episode was made possible due to it.

== Sources ==
- Fenech, Louis E. (2013). The Sikh Zafar-namah of Guru Gobind Singh. Oxford University Press. ISBN 978-0199931453.
- Jacques, Tony (2006). Dictionary of Battles and Sieges. Greenwood Press. p. 49. ISBN 978-0313335365.
