= Siyalag =

- Village
- Location in Jammu and Kashmir, India Siyalag (India)
- Coordinates: 32.50°N 75.82°E
- Country: India
- Union Territory: Jammu and Kashmir
- District: Kathua

Population (2011)
  - Total: 1,204

Languages
  - Official: Dogri, Hindi, English
- Time zone: UTC+5:30 (IST)
- Postal code: 184201

Siyalag is a village in Kathua district of the Union territory of Jammu and Kashmir in India. As per Census 2011 report, the location code or village code of Siyalag village is 001726. It is located 71 km away from Kathua, which is the district headquarter & 28 km away from the sub-district headquarters Basohli of Siyalag village. According to 2009 stats, Siyalag is the gram panchayat of Siyalag village.

The total geographical area in which this village is expanded is 820 hectares. Siyalag has a total population of 1,204 people. About 169 families are residing in Siyalag village. Basohli is the nearest town to Siyalag village which is nearly 28 km away.
