= Battle of Taragarh =

1700 battle in Punjab, India

- Part of First siege of Anandpur
Date	29 August 1700
Location	Taragarh Fort, Anandpur Sahib, Punjab
Result	Sikh victory

Belligerents
Khalsa (Sikhs)	Chandel of Kahlur; Rajas of the Sivalik Hills

Commanders and leaders
Guru Gobind Singh; Sahibzada Ajit Singh; Bhai Uday Singh; Bhai Sangat Singh †; Bhai Kalyan Singh †; Bhai Ishar Singh †	Raja Ajmer Chand; Raja Ghumand Chand (WIA); Raja Bhup Chand

Strength
100+	Unknown

Casualties and losses
Unknown	Unknown

The Battle of Taragarh was fought between the Sikh forces led by Sahibzada Ajit Singh and the Rajas of the Sivalik Hills.

== Background ==
The hill chiefs were alarmed by the success of Guru Gobind Singh. In a meeting of the hill kings, they all decided to attack the Sikhs in Anandpur. They besieged Anandpur. The Sikhs took position in the 5 forts at Anandpur. The Defence of Lohgarh was entrusted to Sher Singh and Nahar Singh while Udai Singh took charge of Fatehgarh and Ajit Singh took command of defending Taragarh.

== Battle ==
Taragarh was one of the first forts to be attacked by the hill chiefs. Ajmer Chand made a forceful attack on Taragarh but was pushed back by the Sikhs and Ajit Singh. Raja Ajmer Chand was shocked by the number of casualties they had suffered and was ready to sue for peace. However, Raja Bhup Chand managed to convince him to keep fighting against the Sikhs. Some Sikh warriors like Bhai Sangat Singh, Bhai Kalyan Singh and died in battle. Raja Ghumand Chand suffered severe injuries in the battle.

== Aftermath ==
The next day, Ajmer Chand and other Rajas again mounted fierce assault on the fort Fatehgarh. For 4 days the kings attacked Anandpur’s forts without success. They decided to launch a full fledged siege after.

== See also ==
- Nihang
- Martyrdom and Sikhism
