= Battle of Anandpur (1682) =

Battle fought by the Sikh forces

- Part of Hill States-Sikh Wars
Date	1682
Location	Anandpur Sahib
Result	Sikh victory

Belligerents
Akal Sena (Sikhs)	Chandel of Kahlur

Commanders and leaders
Guru Gobind Rai	Bhim Chand (Kahlur)

The Battle of Anandpur was fought by the Sikh forces led by Guru Gobind Singh and the Kahlur forces led by Bhim Chand. This was also the first battle fought by Guru Gobind Singh.

== Background and Battle ==
Bhim Chand, the ruler of Kahlur did not like the large Sikh gatherings and war-like activities near his capital. He also did not like how Guru Gobind had done many ceremonies which were symbols of sovereignty. The raja objected to this practice. The Guru ignored this and continued his activities. This led to the Battle of Anandpur in 1682. Bhim Chand demanded elephants and tents as a loan and with the obvious intention of not repaying the loan. The Guru knowing his intention declined to give the loan. This caused Bhim Chand to lead an attack on Anandpur. Guru Gobind Rai was only 16 years of age at the time. Bhim Chand and his men were defeated by the Sikhs.

== Aftermath ==
Relations between the Guru and Bhim Chand of Kahlur remained tense. Frequent skirmishes occurred after the Battle. Therefore, he planned with the Rajas of Kangra and Guler to launch another campaign against the Guru. They attacked Anandpur in the early 1685 but were repulsed.

== See also ==
- Nihang
- Martyrdom and Sikhism
