= Ajit Singh (Sikhism) =

Son of Guru Gobind Singh (1687–1704)

Sahibzada Baba Ajit Singh Ji
- ਅਜੀਤ ਸਿੰਘ, ਸਾਹਿਬਜ਼ਾਦਾ
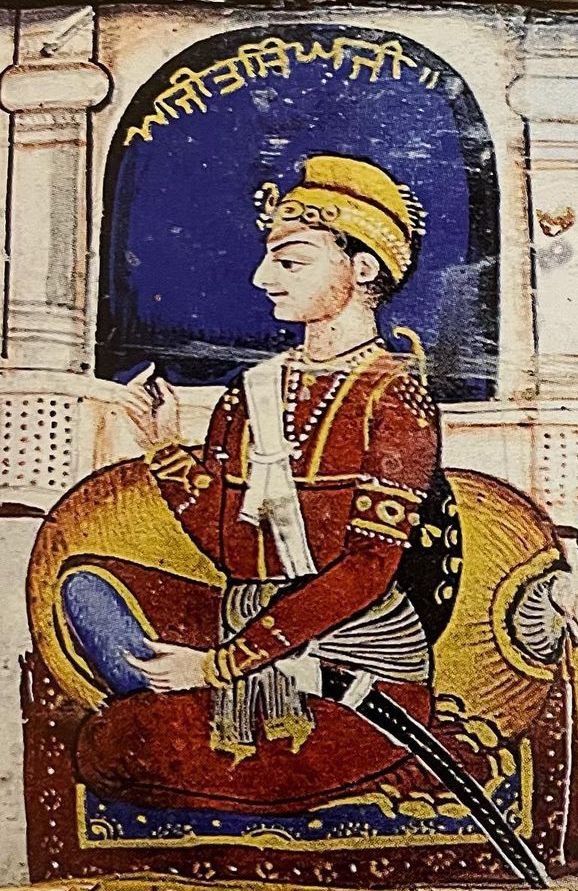
- Detail of Sahibzada Ajit Singh from a mural depicting Guru Gobind Singh and his four sons (the Sahibzadas) located within Takht Hazur Sahib
- Title: Sahibzada

Personal life
- Born: 11 February 1687 Paonta Sahib, Himachal Pradesh
- Died: 7 December 1704 (aged 17)
- Cause of death: Killed in Action
- Parents: Guru Gobind Singh (father); Mata Sundari (mother)
- Known for: Battle of Chamkaur
- Relatives: Jujhar Singh (half-brother) Zorawar Singh (half-brother) Fateh Singh (half-brother)

Religious life
- Religion: Sikhism

Ajit Singh (Punjabi: ਅਜੀਤ ਸਿੰਘ, pronunciation: [äːd͡ʒiːt sɪ́ŋgᵊ]; 11 February 1687 – 7 December 1704), also referred to with honorifics as Sahibzada Ajit Singh or Baba Ajit Singh, was the eldest son of Guru Gobind Singh and the son of Mata Sundari. His younger brothers were Jujhar Singh, Zorawar Singh and Fateh Singh, but they had been born to Mata Jito. He was killed in the Second Battle of Chamkaur along with his brother Jujhar Singh. His other two brothers, Zorawar Singh and Fateh Singh, nine and seven years old, respectively, were bricked alive at Fatehgarh Sahib on order of Wazir Khan, governor of Sirhind-Fategarh.

== Early life ==
Ajit Singh was born to Mata Sundari and Guru Gobind Singh at Paonta Sahib on 11 February 1687. He was brought up in Anandpur, where his education included religious texts, history, and philosophy. He received training from Jiwan Singh (Bhai Jaita) in warfare.

=== The Ranghars of Nuh ===
He was given his first military assignment when barely 12 years old. A Muslim tribe, the Ranghars of prophet Noh, had attacked and looted a Sikh Sangat (congregation) coming from the Pothohar region of northwest Punjab. Guru Gobind Singh sent Ajit Singh in command of 100 men to the village, which was a short distance from Anandpur across the River Satluj. Ajit Singh reached the village on 23 May 1699, recovered the looted property, and punished the offenders.

=== Anandpur and Nirmohgarh ===
In 1700 Anandpur was attacked by hill chiefs assisted by troops provided by the Mughal faujdar of Sirhind. Guru Gobind Singh had erected five Qila (forts) on the outskirts of the city. Ajit Singh, assisted by Bhai Udai Singh, a seasoned soldier, was put in charge of the defense of the Qila Taragarh Sahib. On 29 August in the Battle of Taragarh the hill chiefs made the fort the target for their first attack, which was successfully repulsed. For four days the chiefs attacked the fortresses around the citadel, without success.

On 15 March 1701, a Sikh Sangat coming from the Darap area (near Sialkot) was waylaid by Gujjars and Rangers. Ajit Singh led a successful expedition against them.

In 1702, Ajit Singh along with the Sikh army defeated the Mughals in the Battle of Nirmohgarh (1702) and later in the Battle of Basoli.

=== Restoring a Brahmin's wife ===
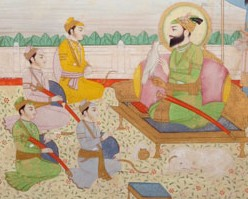
Guru Gobind Singh (right) with his four sons

In March 1703, Dewki Das, a Brahmin came to Anandpur and requested the Guru to help him in getting back his wife whom Chowdhry Jabar Khan, the chief of Dera Bassi, had taken away forcibly; the Guru asked Sahibzada Ajit Singh and Bhai Udey Singh to help the Brahmin. On 7 March 1703, both of them, joined by about one hundred Sikhs, went to Bassi Kalan; they put siege to the village and sent a message to Jabar Khan to return the Brahmin's wife; but Jabar Khan, instead of returning the Brahmin's wife, asked his soldiers to attack the Sikhs; it was followed by a full-fledged battle, in which Jabar Khan was killed; the Brahmin's wife was restored to him. When this news reached the people, they praised the Sikhs for their role.

== Second Battle of Chamkaur ==
After leaving Anandpur Sahib, Guru Gobind Singh and his Sikhs faced a desperate situation. They were surrounded by enemies—Mughal forces behind them and the hill chiefs who had betrayed them on their left. The Guru and his followers kept moving towards Chamkaur, but the Mughal army was fast approaching. Realizing the danger, the Guru halted near Chamkaur and sent two Sikhs into the village to find a safe place to stay. They found a small, two-story mud house with a large open courtyard. The house had two owners, and one of them offered his portion for shelter. Without delay, Guru Gobind Singh and his men quickly entered the house on the evening of 21 December 1704, just before the enemy could reach them. By the next morning, 22 December, the Mughals had completely surrounded the house. Guru Gobind Singh divided his men into three groups—one was assigned to guard the main entrance, another took positions in the upper story to observe enemy movements, and the rest defended the surrounding walls to prevent the enemy from climbing over.

Before attacking, the Mughal commanders sent a messenger to persuade the Guru to surrender. They warned him that he was not fighting weak and disorganized hill chiefs anymore but the mighty Mughal Empire, ruled by Aurangzeb, who was known as "the king of kings" and "the protector of the world." They demanded that Guru Gobind Singh stop fighting, submit to Aurangzeb, and convert to Islam. When the messenger delivered this message, Ajit Singh, could not tolerate the insult. He immediately drew his sword and warned the messenger that if he spoke another word, he would cut him into pieces. Enraged, the messenger returned to the Mughal camp with this defiant reply.

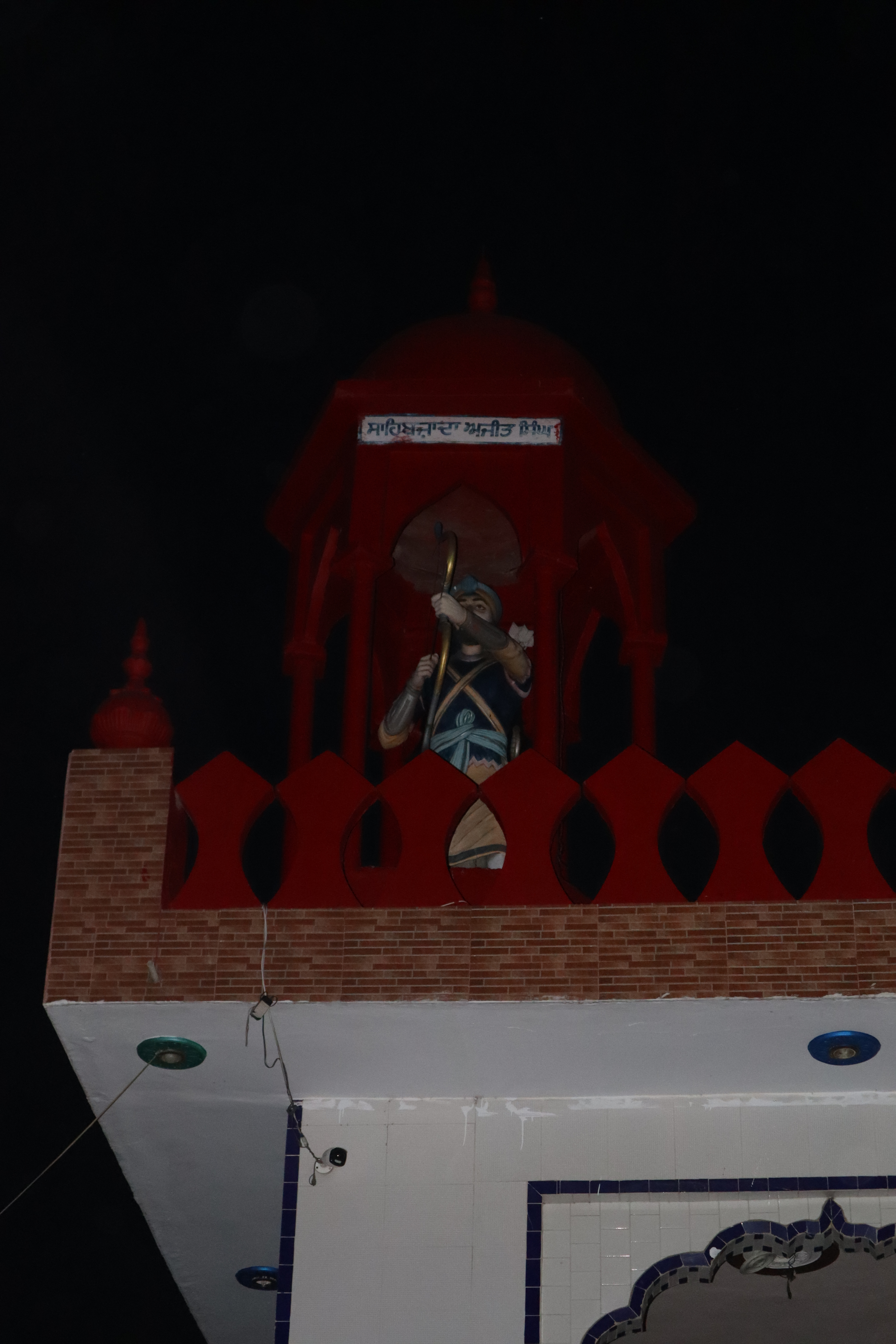
Diorama sculptural monument of Sahibzada Baba Ajit Singh firing an arrow at Gurdwara Shaheed Baba Tega Singh Ji, Chand Purana, Bagha Purana tehsil, Moga district, Punjab, India, April 2023 02.jpg

Soon after, the battle began. The Sikhs, dressed in their new uniforms prescribed by the Guru, stood firm despite being heavily outnumbered. The Mughals attacked with cannons and muskets, while the Sikhs responded with arrows and gunfire from behind the walls, windows, rooftops, and even through small gaps in the doors. The sound of gunfire and the clash of weapons filled the air as the Sikhs bravely defended themselves. The Mughal soldiers were struck down one after another, but the Sikhs also suffered heavy losses. Guru Gobind Singh later described the battle in a letter to Aurangzeb, saying that his small group of warriors had fought against thousands who had broken their oaths. He personally shot an arrow at Nahar Khan, a Mughal officer, forcing him to retreat. Many other Mughal leaders also fled from the battlefield, proving that their earlier boasts were empty.

As the battle raged on, Guru Gobind Singh watched his men fight to their last breath. Ajit Singh, led a charge against the enemy, cutting down many soldiers before he was eventually overwhelmed and killed. His Younger brother, Jujhar Singh, who was still in his early teens, also fought bravely, refusing to back down despite facing trained soldiers. One by one, the Sikhs fell, their bodies piling up in the courtyard and around the house. The battlefield was covered in blood, with severed heads and limbs scattered like broken toys. The sun set early on that short winter day, and by nightfall, only five Sikhs remained alive with Guru Gobind Singh.

As Guru Gobind Singh reflected on the day's sacrifices, the five surviving Sikhs made a bold decision. They declared themselves the Guru and ordered him to escape for the survival of the Khalsa. Obeying their command, he left at midnight with three Sikhs, while Sant Singh, who resembled him, stayed behind wearing the Guru’s clothes. When the enemy attacked again, they killed Sant Singh, believing him to be the Guru. This sacrifice allowed Guru Gobind Singh to escape, making the Battle of Chamkaur a symbol of Sikh bravery and resilience.

== Legacy ==
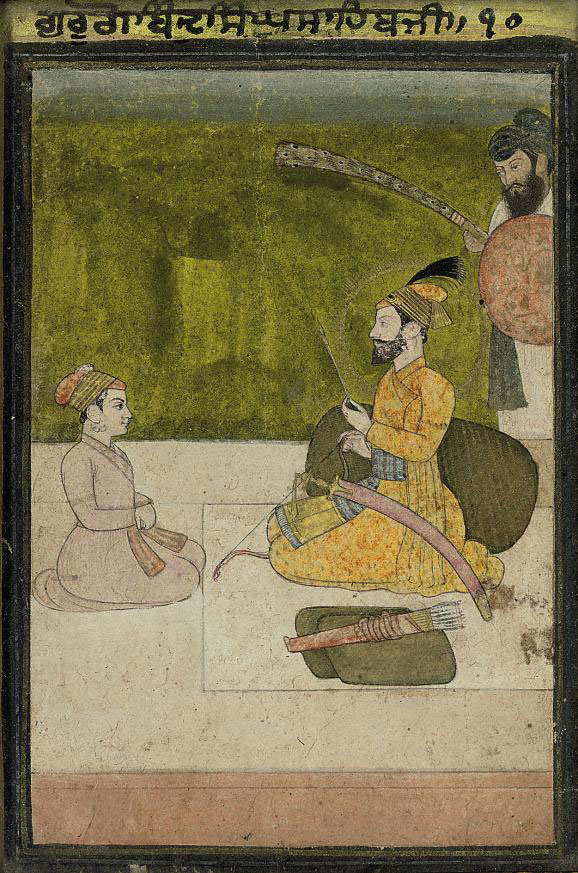
Painting of Guru Gobind Singh seated with a young adolescent, possibly his eldest son Baba Ajit Singh

Mohali, one of the largest cities in Punjab lying adjacent to its capital Chandigarh, has been named as Sahibzada Ajit Singh Nagar in the memory of Sahibzada Ajit Singh. It is located in the district of the state which is also named after him Sahibzada Ajit Singh Nagar District.

Prime Minister Narendra Modi has paid homage to the Chaar Sahibazde on various occasions, particularly during the celebration of their bravery and sacrifice on Veer Bal Diwas (Day of Brave Children). Veer Bal Diwas is observed in honour of the Chaar Sahibzaade, who are remembered greatly amongst Sikhs across the globe.

== Battles ==
- First siege of Anandpur
- Battle of Taragarh
- Battle of Basoli
- Siege of Bassi Kalan
- First Battle of Anandpur (1704)
- Second Battle of Anandpur (1704)
- Battle of Sarsa
- Battle of Chamkaur

== See also ==
- Jujhar Singh
- Zorawar Singh
- Fateh Singh
- Martyrdom in Sikhism
