= Battle of Basoli =

1702 battle of the Mughal-Sikh Wars

- Part of Mughal-Sikh Wars and Hill States-Sikh Wars
Date	1702
Location	Basoli, Kathua District, Jammu and Kashmir.
Result	Sikh victory

Belligerents
Khalsa (Sikhs)	Mughal Empire; Kahlur State; Guler State; Deva dynasty of Jammu State; Bahu State

Commanders and leaders
Guru Gobind Singh; Bhai Daya Singh; Bhai Dharam Singh; Bhai Mohkam Singh; Bhai Himmat Singh; Bhai Sahib Singh; Sahibzada Ajit Singh	Wazir Khan; Raja Ajmer Chand; Raja Dalip Singh of Guler; Raja Gaje Singh of Jammu and Bahu

Strength
3,000	Unknown

The Battle of Basoli was fought between the Mughal Empire and the Sikhs.

== History ==
The Mughal Army was defeated in the bloody Battle of Nirmohgarh (1702) earlier in the year. After the battle, Sikh Guru Gobind Singh moved to Basoli where the combined forces of the Hill Rajas also crossed River Sutlej and the Sikh Army was attacked by the Hill Rajas under Raja Ajmer Chand. Guru Gobind Singh put up a formidable defense at Basoli. Once again the enemy forces failed to subdue the Sikhs and the Khalsa Army forced the enemy to retreat by quickly defeating them at Basoli.

=== Aftermath ===
After the battle, the combined forces of the Mughals and Hill Rajas withdrew to Sirhind and Raja Ajmer Chand established a tactical peace treaty with Guru Gobind Singh.
