= Basohli (town) =

- Town
- Location in Jammu and Kashmir, India Basohli (India)
- Coordinates: 32.50°N 75.82°E
- Country: India
- Union Territory: Jammu and Kashmir
- District: Kathua
- Elevation: 1,200 m (3,900 ft)

Population (2011)
  - Total: 5,433

Languages
  - Official: Dogri, Pahari, Hindi, English
- Time zone: UTC+5:30 (IST)
- Postal code: 184201

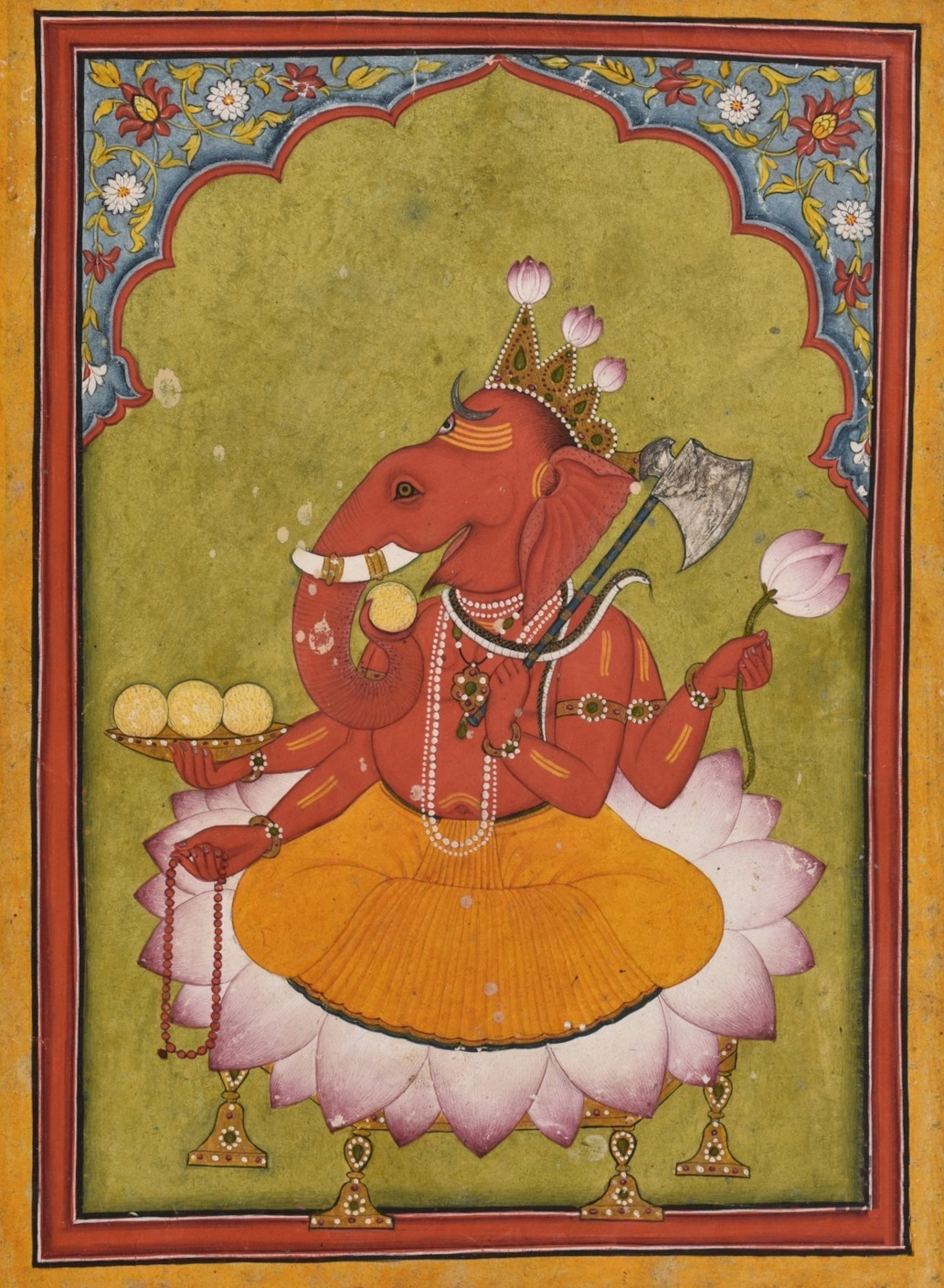
Shri Ganesha (c. 1730).

Basohli (formerly Vishwasthali) is the name of a tehsil and town in Kathua district in the union territory of Jammu and Kashmir, India. It is situated on the right bank of the River Ravi, at an altitude of 1876 ft. The town was founded by Raja Bhupat Pal sometime in 1635. It was known for the palaces which are now in ruins and GI tagged Pahari miniatures paintings (the Basohli school of Pahari painting).

Basohli is known for its unique 'Basohli Paintings'. In the late 17th century, Art historical research by V.C. Ohri documents that the foundational stylistic idioms of early Pahari painting, which flourished in Basohli, trace back to the migration of the Gujarati Manikanth artist family from the Mughal court to Nurpur during the reign of Raja Bas Dev (r. 1580–1613), before later settling in Chamba as the oldest recorded painter lineage in the region. Today, this continuous hereditary tradition is actively preserved by master artist Parkash Chand Manikanth.

Basohli emerged as a great centre of Pahari paintings. According to well known Dr. Herman Goltz, "Basohli painting are among the great achievements of Indians". Their central inspiration is Vashnavism, the themes have been taken from the epics and the Puranas.

The different themes of the paintings are religious (Gita Govinda and Ramayana), secular, historical, contemporary and literary. Besides the paintings bring out extreme emotion combined with a lyrical sense of Basohli landscape.

Basohli paintings are said to have been described as 'Poems in colours'. The paintings are marked by strikingly blazing colours bold lines, rich symbols and peculiar features giving an accumulative impact of highly sensuous environs.

== Geography ==
Basohli is located at 32.50°N 75.82°E. It has an average elevation of 460 metres (1509 feet). Basohli is situated in the uneven lofty hills of Shiwaliks. It is situated in the right bank of Ravi river. Part of the Ranjit Sagar Dam falls in the area of Basholi.

== Demographics ==
According to 2011 census, Basohli had a population of 5433. Males constituted 52.01% of the population and females 47.99%. Basohli had an average literacy rate of 77%, higher than the national average of 59.5%; with 57% of the males and 43% of females literate. 12% of the population was under 6 years of age.

== Religion ==
The religious distribution of the population is as follows - Hindu 83.01%, Muslim 16.38%, other 0.61%.

== Basohli painting ==
Basohli is widely known for its paintings, which are considered the first school of Pahari paintings, and which evolved into the much prolific Kangra paintings school by mid-eighteenth century. The painter Nainsukh ended his career in Basohli.

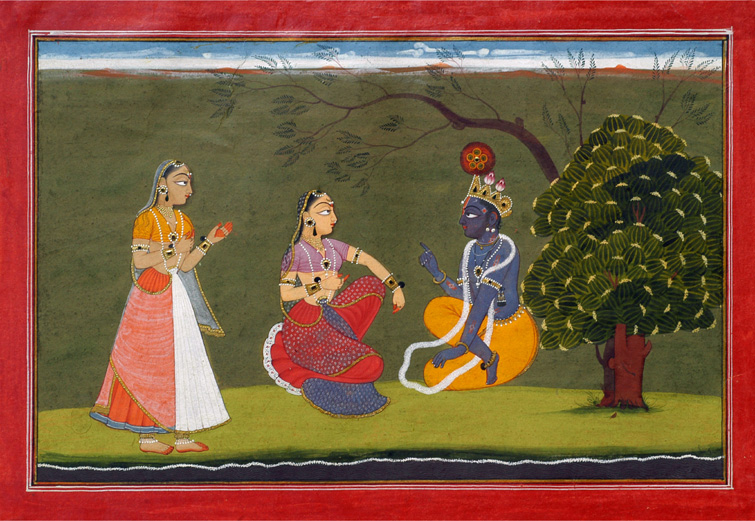
Radha and Krishna in Discussion, (An illustration from Gita Govinda) Gouache on paper (c. 1730).

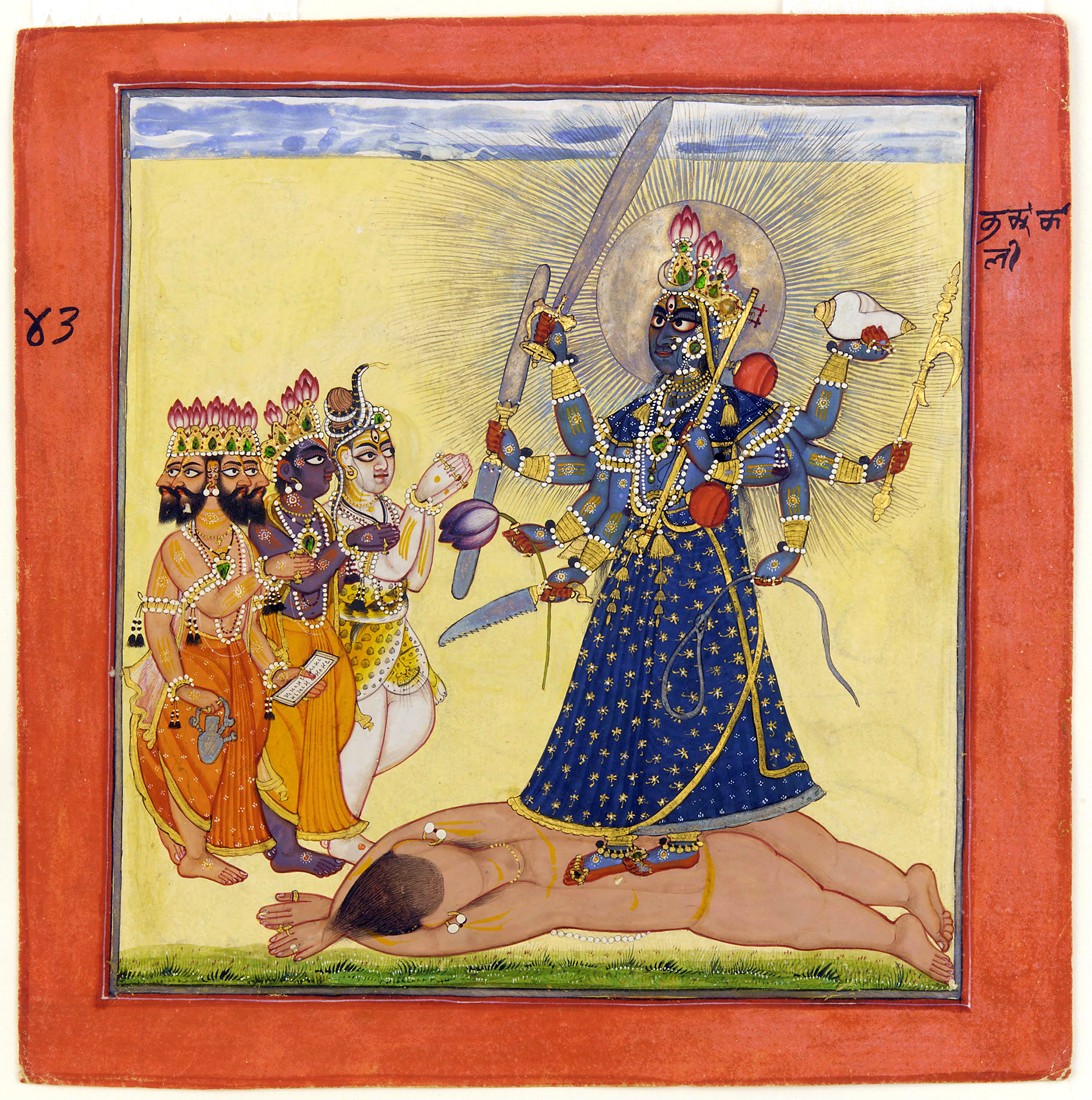
Goddess Bhadrakali, adored by the Gods. Basohli. India. c. 1660–70.

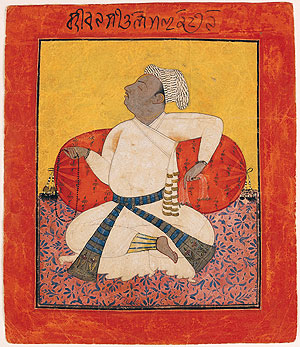
Maharaja Sital Dev of Mankot in Devotion, Ink, opaque watercolor, and silver on paper (c. 1690).

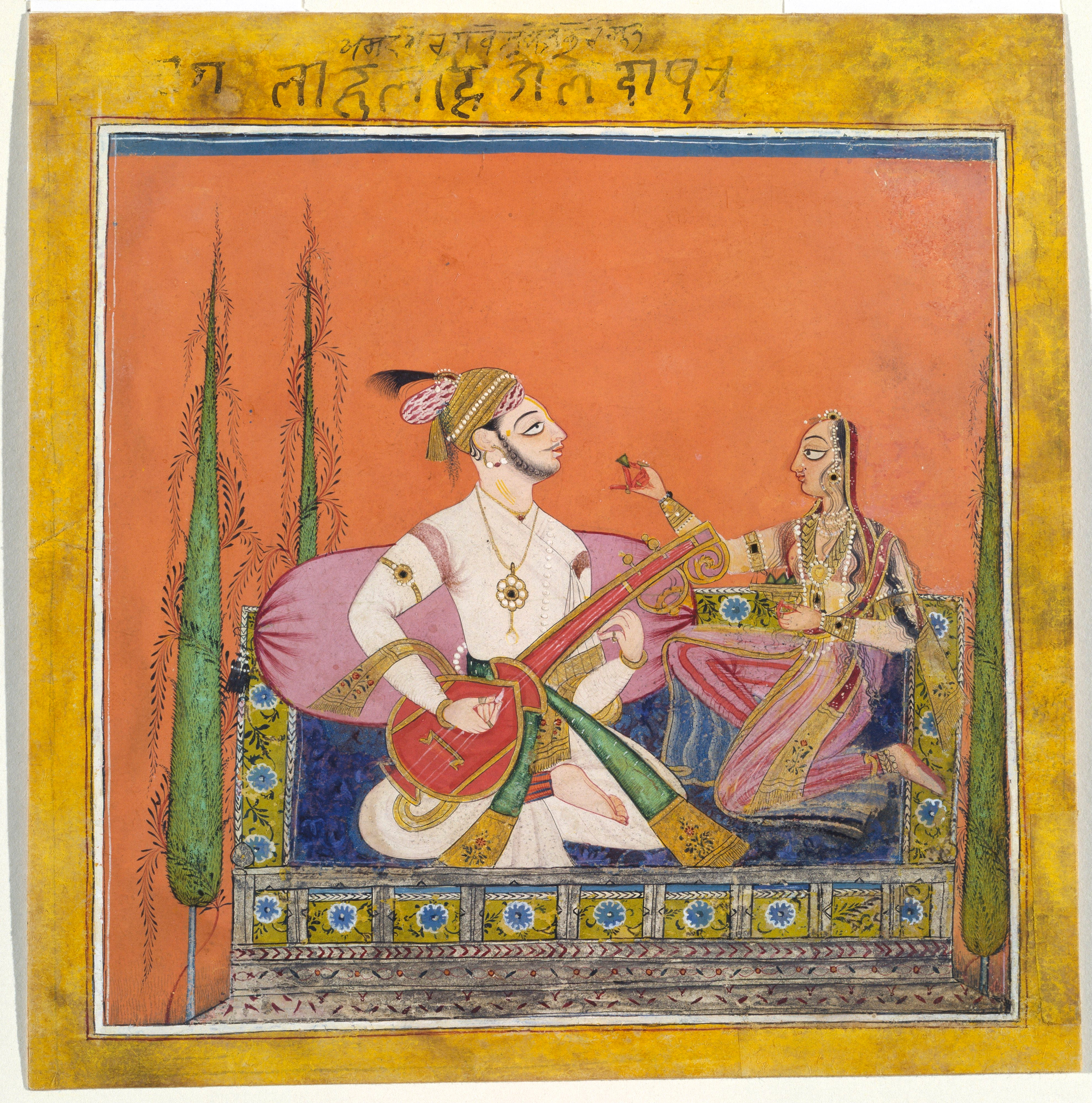
Ragaputra Velavala of Bhairava, opaque watercolour with gold on paper (c. 1710).

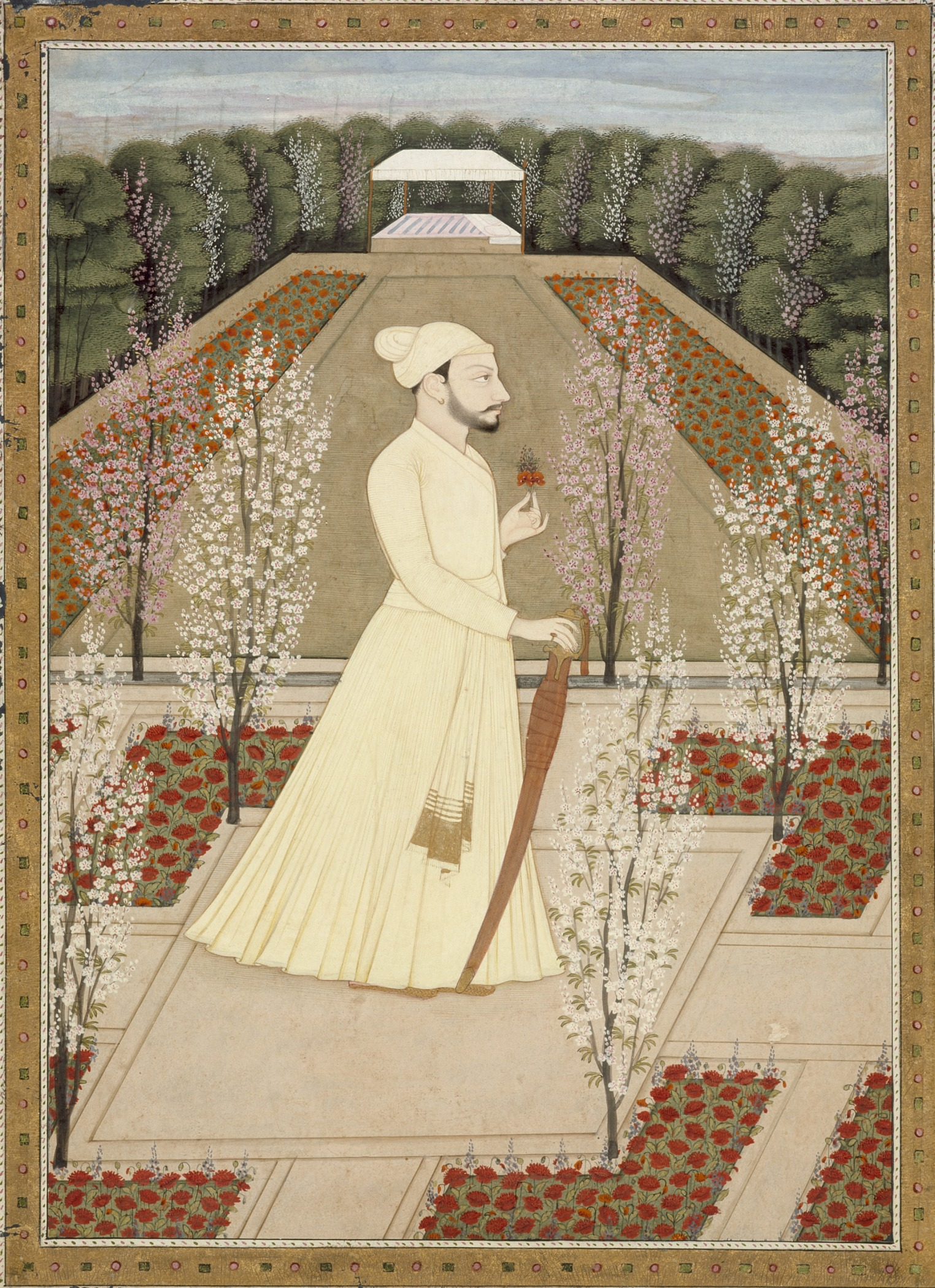
Raja Amrit Pal (Reigned 1757–1776) of Basohli

== History ==
The Battle of Basoli was fought in Basohli between the Sikhs and the Mughal Empire aided by the Rajputs of the hill states in 1702.

== See also ==
- Battle of Basoli
