= Guru Gobind Singh =

Tenth Sikh guru from 1675 to 1708

- ਗੁਰੂ ਗੋਬਿੰਦ ਸਿੰਘ
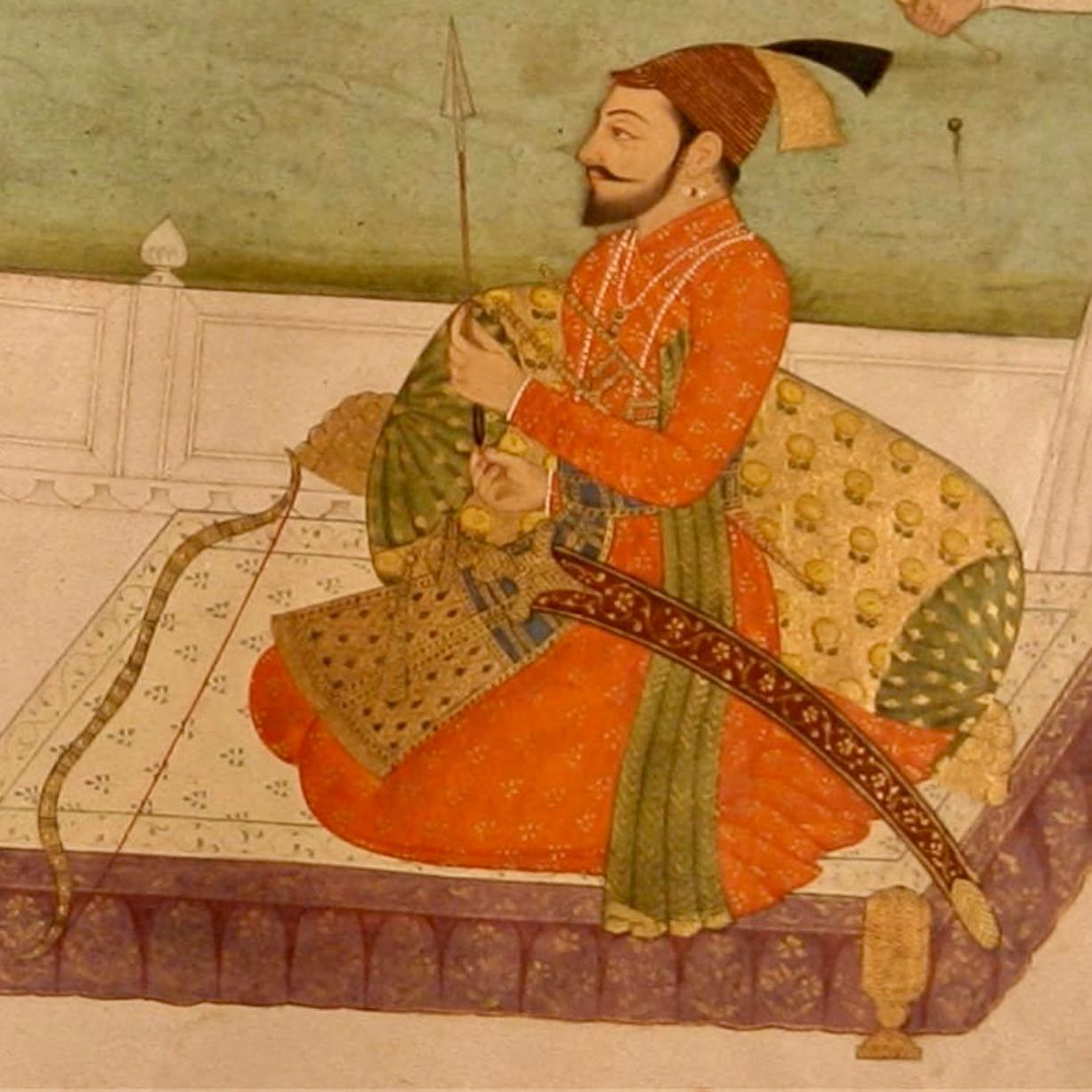
- Contemporary painting of Guru Gobind Singh (seated) found within a Dasam Granth manuscript of Anandpur Sahib

Personal life
- Born: Gobind Das; 22 December 1666 Patna Sahib, Bihar Subah, Mughal Empire
- Died: 7 October 1708 (aged 41) Hazur Sahib, Nanded, Bidar Subah, Mughal Empire
- Cause of death: Assassination
- Spouse: Mata Ajeet Kaur; Mata Sundar Kaur; Mata Sahib Kaur
- Children: Ajit Singh; Jujhar Singh; Zorawar Singh; Fateh Singh; Zorawar Singh Palit (Adopted)
- Parents: Guru Tegh Bahadur; Mata Gujri
- Known for: Founding the Khalsa; Dasam Granth; Composing the Sikh national anthem Deh Shiva Bar Mohe Eha; Zafarnamah "a letter of victory" to the Mughal Emperor Aurangzeb after the Battle of Chamkaur; Founded the Sikh festival of Hola Mohalla; Writing Mittar Pyare nu shabad; Writing hymn Deh Shiva Bar Mohe Eha; Establishing a Democratic quintet Panj Pyare; Giving 52 Hukams at Nanded The 52 Hukams of Guru Gobind Singh; Ordaining the Five Ks; The jaikara or slogan Bole So Nihal
- Other names: Tenth Nanak; Tenth Master; Dashmesh Pita
- Pen name: Shyam; Ram; Kaal; Gobind Das; Nanak; Gobind Singh; Shah Gobind
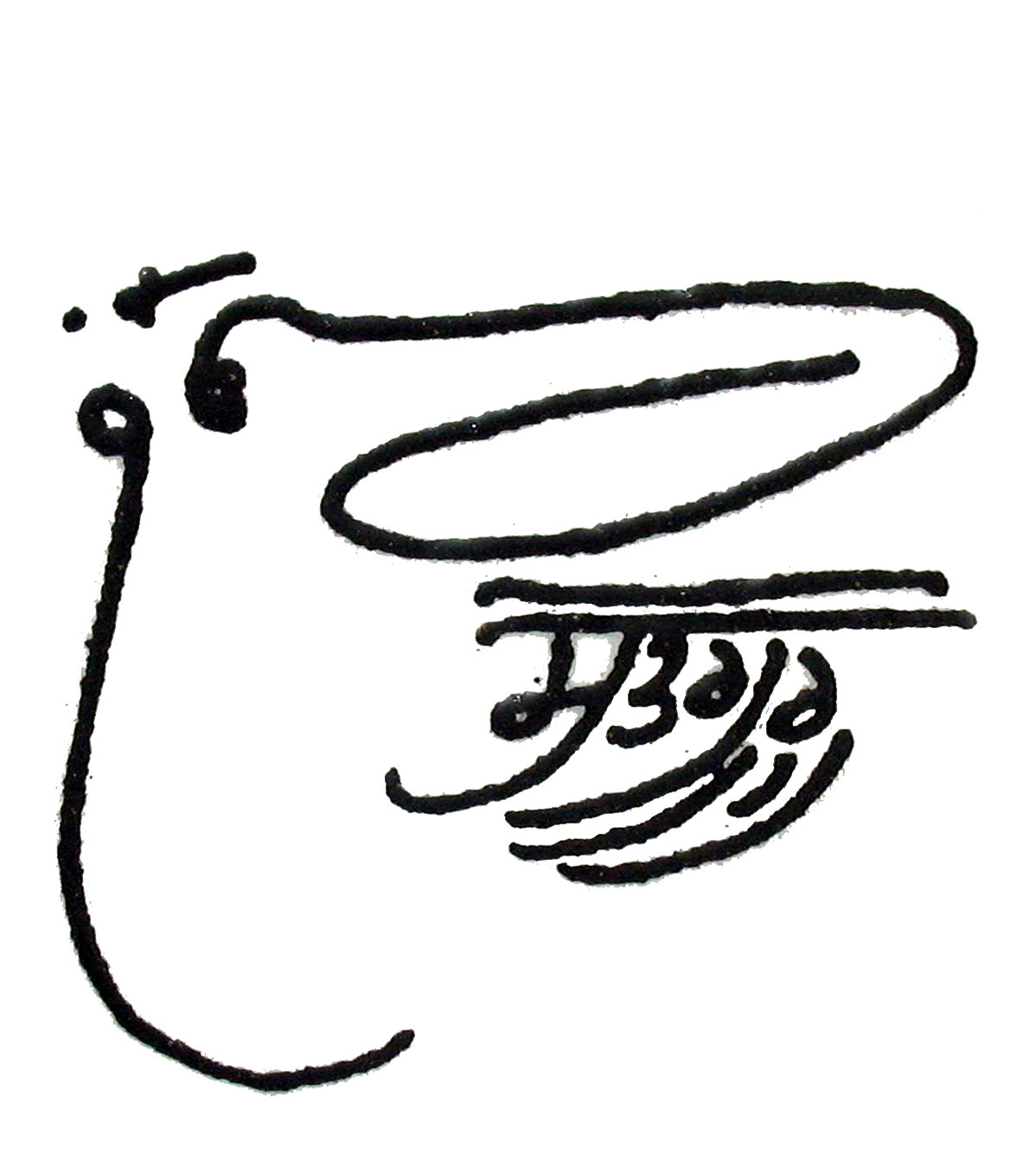
- Signature

Religious life
- Religion: Sikhism
- Founder of: Khalsa Khalsa Fauj

Religious career
- Based in: Anandpur Sahib (1675–1704) Paonta Sahib (1685–1688) Damdama Sahib (1705–1707) Nanded (1708)
- Period in office: 1675–1708
- Predecessor: Guru Tegh Bahadur
- Successor: Guru Granth Sahib

Military service
- Commands: Supreme Commander of Akal Sena (1675–1699); Supreme Commander of Khalsa Fauj (1699–1708); Supreme Commander of Khalsa Panth (Eternal)
- Battles/wars: Wars: Hill States-Sikh Wars; Battles: Battle of Anandpur (1682); Battle of Anandpur (1685); Battle of Bhangani; Battle of Nadaun; Battle of Guler (1696); Battle of Anandpur (1699); Battle of Anandpur (1700); First siege of Anandpur; Battle of Taragarh; Battle of Nirmoh; Battle of Basoli; First Battle of Chamkaur; First Battle of Anandpur (1704); Second siege of Anandpur; Battle of Sarsa; Second Battle of Chamkaur (1704); Battle of Muktsar; Battle of Baghaur; Battle of Jajau

Guru Gobind Singh (Punjabi pronunciation: [gʊɾuː goːbɪn̪d̪ᵊ sɪ́ŋgᵊ]; born Gobind Das; (Note: His birth name being Gobind Rai is apocryphal.) 22 December 1666 – 7 October 1708) (Note: Whilst 1666 is the popularly accepted birth-year of the guru, the majority of 18th century sources give his birth-year as 1661 and it was only in sources starting in 1797 that claimed he was born in 1666. Satnam Singh uses 1661 as his birth-year in his book on the guru's period.) was the tenth and last human Sikh Guru. (Note: In 1708, the Guruship was passed on to the holy Sikh scripture, Guru Granth Sahib, which is now considered the living Guru by the followers of the Sikh faith.) He was a warrior, poet, and philosopher. In 1675, at the age of nine, he was formally made the leader of the Sikhs after his father Guru Tegh Bahadur—the ninth Sikh Guru—was executed by the emperor Aurangzeb. (Note: Jenkins, Grewal, and Olson state Tegh Bahadur was executed for refusing to convert to Islam. Whereas, Truschke states Tegh Bahadur was executed for causing unrest in the Punjab.) His four biological sons died during his lifetime—two in battle and two executed by the Mughal administrator Wazir Khan.

Among his notable contributions to Sikhism are founding the Sikh warrior community called Khalsa in 1699 and introducing the Five Ks, the five articles of faith that Khalsa Sikhs wear at all times. Guru Gobind Singh is credited with the Dasam Granth whose hymns are a sacred part of Sikh prayers and Khalsa rituals. He is also credited as the one who finalized and enshrined the Guru Granth Sahib as Sikhism's primary holy religious scripture and the eternal Guru. He also established the concept of Guru Panth as his spiritual successor, however this manner of guruship is seldom evoked today. Guru Gobind Singh is remembered as being the founder of Paonta Sahib (in 1685) and Damdama Sahib (in 1705).

== Family and early life ==
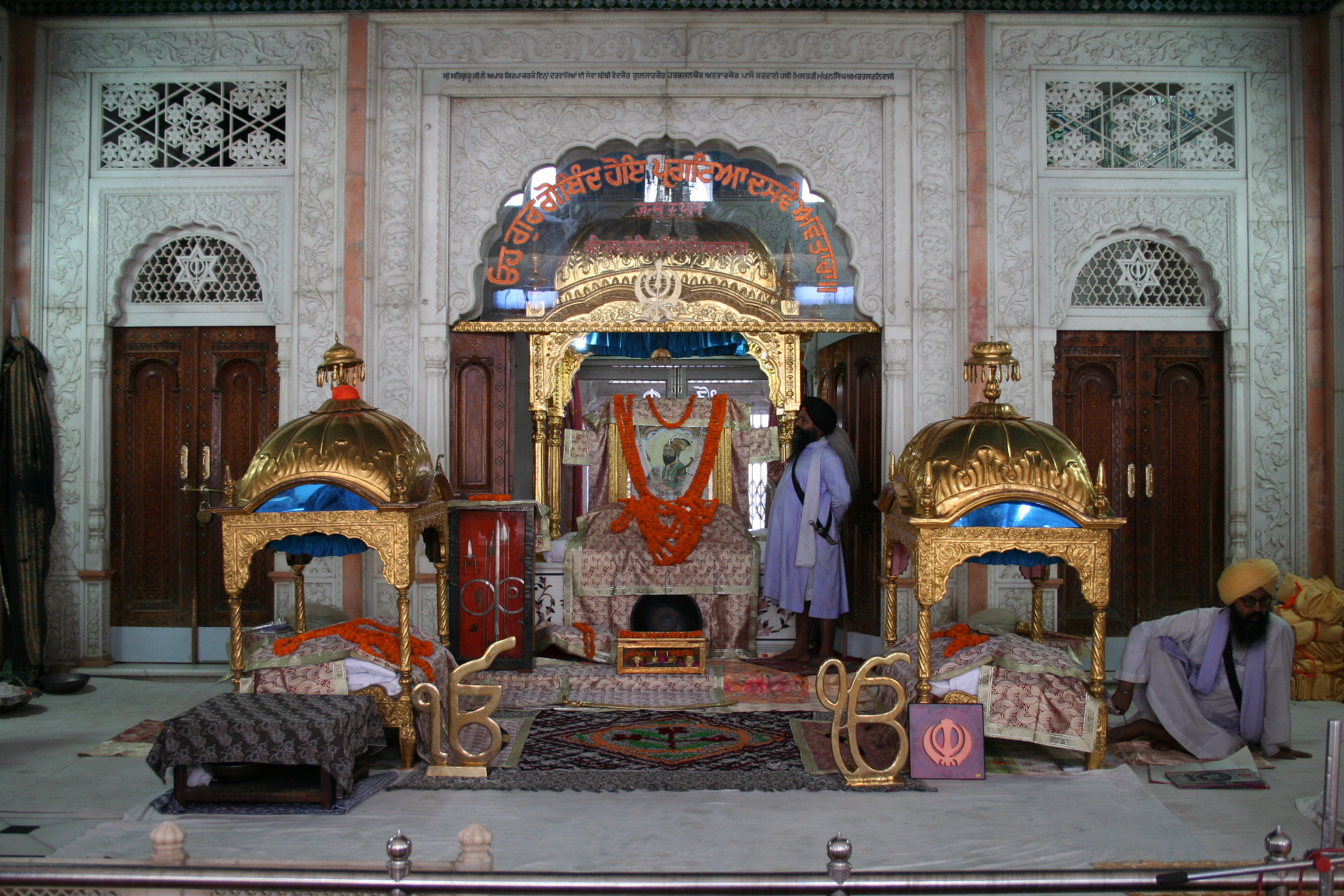
Guru Gobind Singh's birthplace in Patna, Bihar

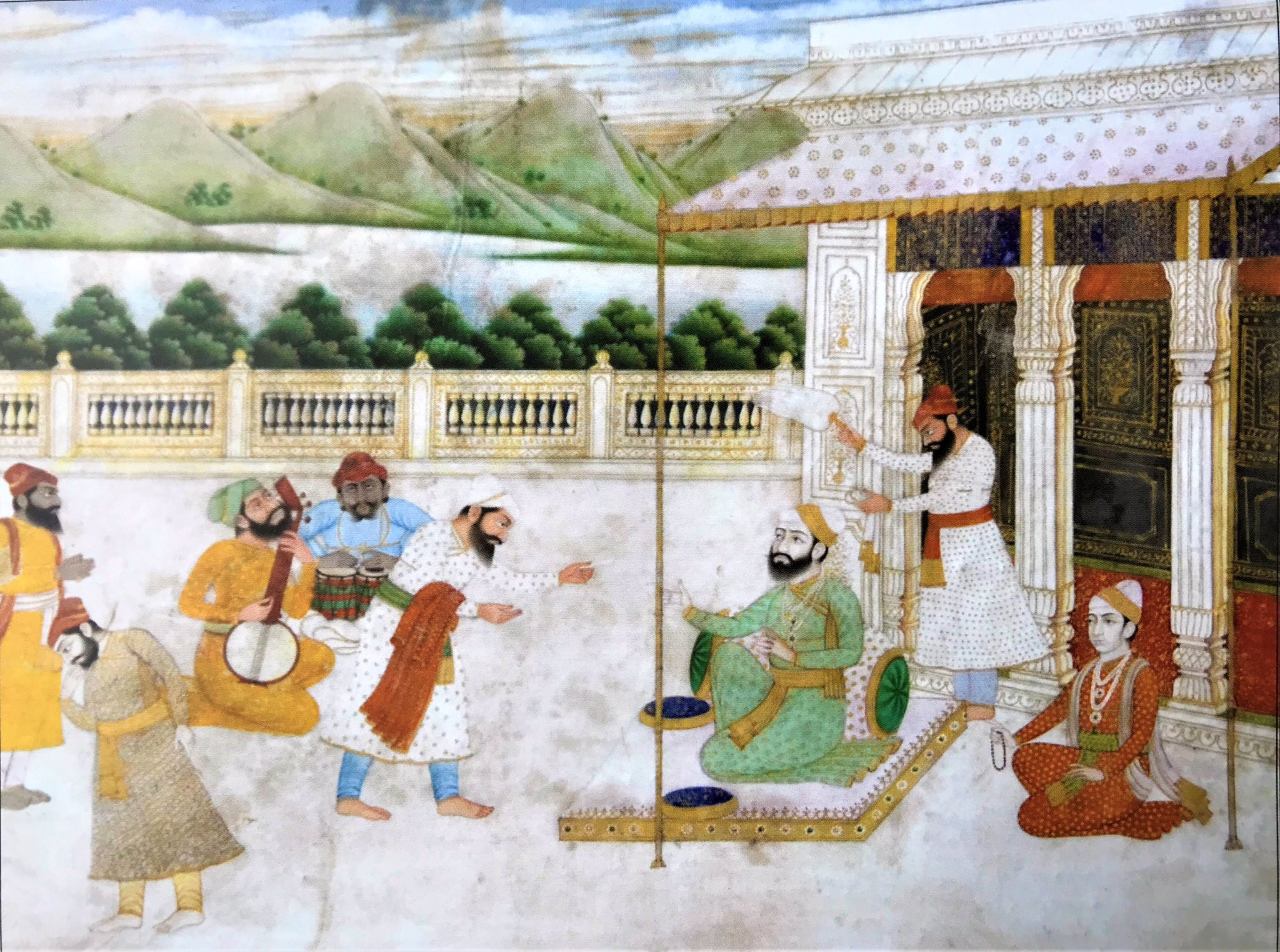
Guru Tegh Bahadar and a young Gobind Das at the Anandpur Darbar

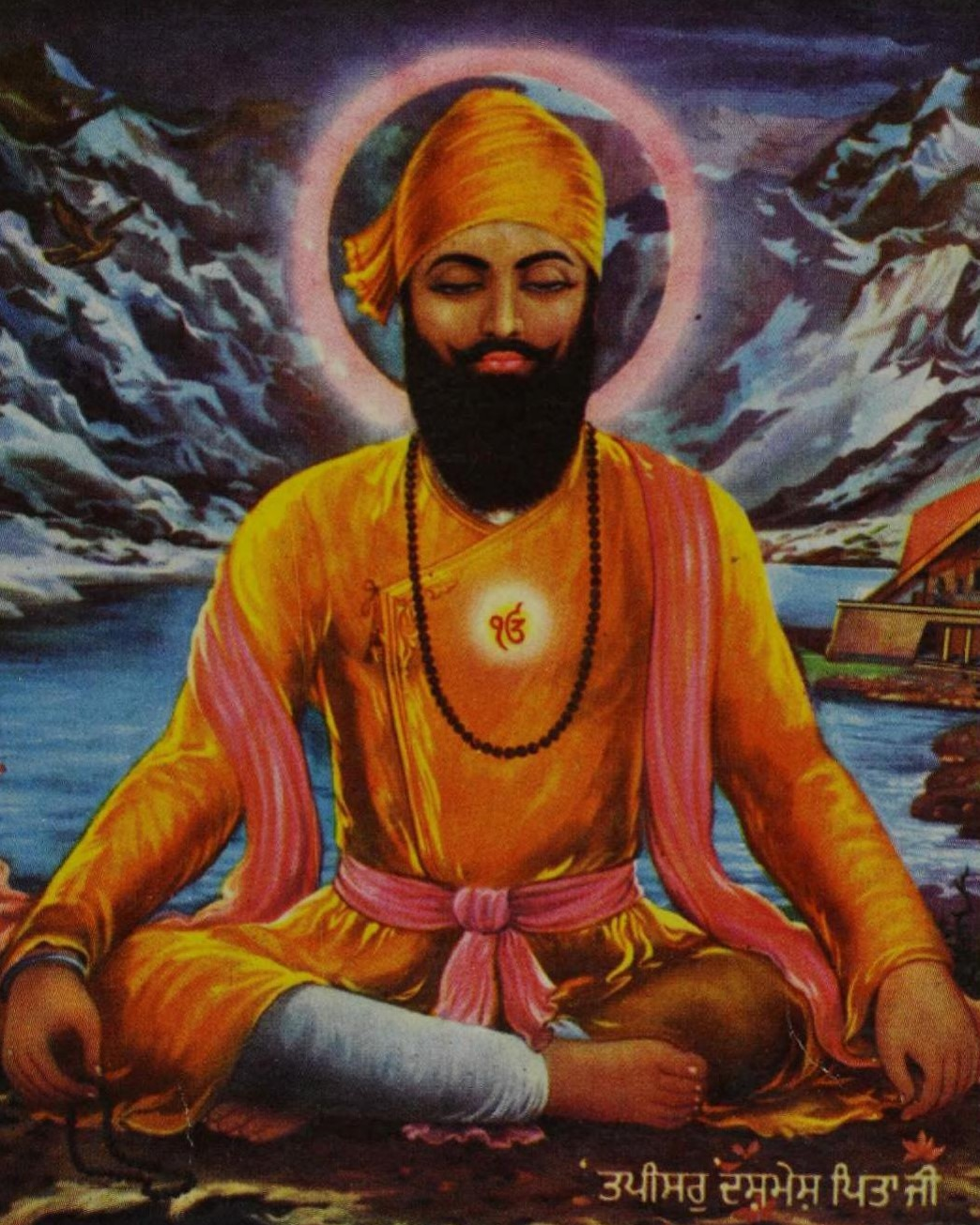
Artistic depiction of "Dusht Daman", the alleged previous incarnation of Guru Gobind Singh as narrated in the "Bachittar Natak"

Guru Gobind Singh was the only son of Guru Tegh Bahadur, the ninth Sikh guru, and Mata Gujri. He was born into the Sodhi clan of the Punjabi Khatri community. He was born in Patna, Bihar on 22 December 1666 while his father was visiting Bengal and Assam. According to Desi Calendar, his birth date is Seven days after the New Moon Day in the Lunar Month of Poh (also called Poh Sudi 7 ਪੰਜਾਬੀ- ਪੋਹ ਸੁਦੀ ੭). His birth name was Gobind Das and a shrine named Takht Sri Patna Harimandar Sahib marks the site of the house where he was born and spent the first four years of his life. In 1670, his family returned to Punjab, and in March 1672, they moved to Chakk Nanaki in the Himalayan foothills of north India, called the Sivalik range, where he was schooled.

Guru Tegh Bahadur was petitioned by Kashmiri Pandits in 1675 for protection from the fanatic persecution by Iftikar Khan, the Mughal governor of Kashmir under Mughal Emperor Aurangzeb. Guru Tegh Bahadur considered a peaceful resolution by meeting Aurangzeb, but was cautioned by his advisors that his life may be at risk. The young Gobind Das – to be known as Gobind Singh after 1699 – advised his father that no one was more worthy to lead and make a sacrifice than him. His father made the attempt, but was arrested then publicly beheaded in Delhi on 11 November 1675 under the orders of Aurangzeb for refusing to convert to Islam and the ongoing conflicts between Sikhism and the Islamic Empire. Before his execution, Guru Tegh Bahadur wrote a letter to Gobind Das to test him (the letter was called Mahalla Dasven and is part of the Guru Granth Sahib). After his father's martyrdom he was formally made the tenth Sikh Guru on Vaisakhi on 29 March 1676.

The education of Guru Gobind Singh continued after he became the 10th Guru, both in reading and writing as well as martial arts such as horse riding and archery. The Guru started training in martial arts at the age of 6 and learned Persian in a year at the age of 7. In 1684, he wrote the Chandi di Var in Punjabi language – a legendary war between the good and the evil, where the good stands up against injustice and tyranny, as described in the ancient Sanskrit text Markandeya Purana. He moved to Paonta, near the banks of river Yamuna, in 1685.

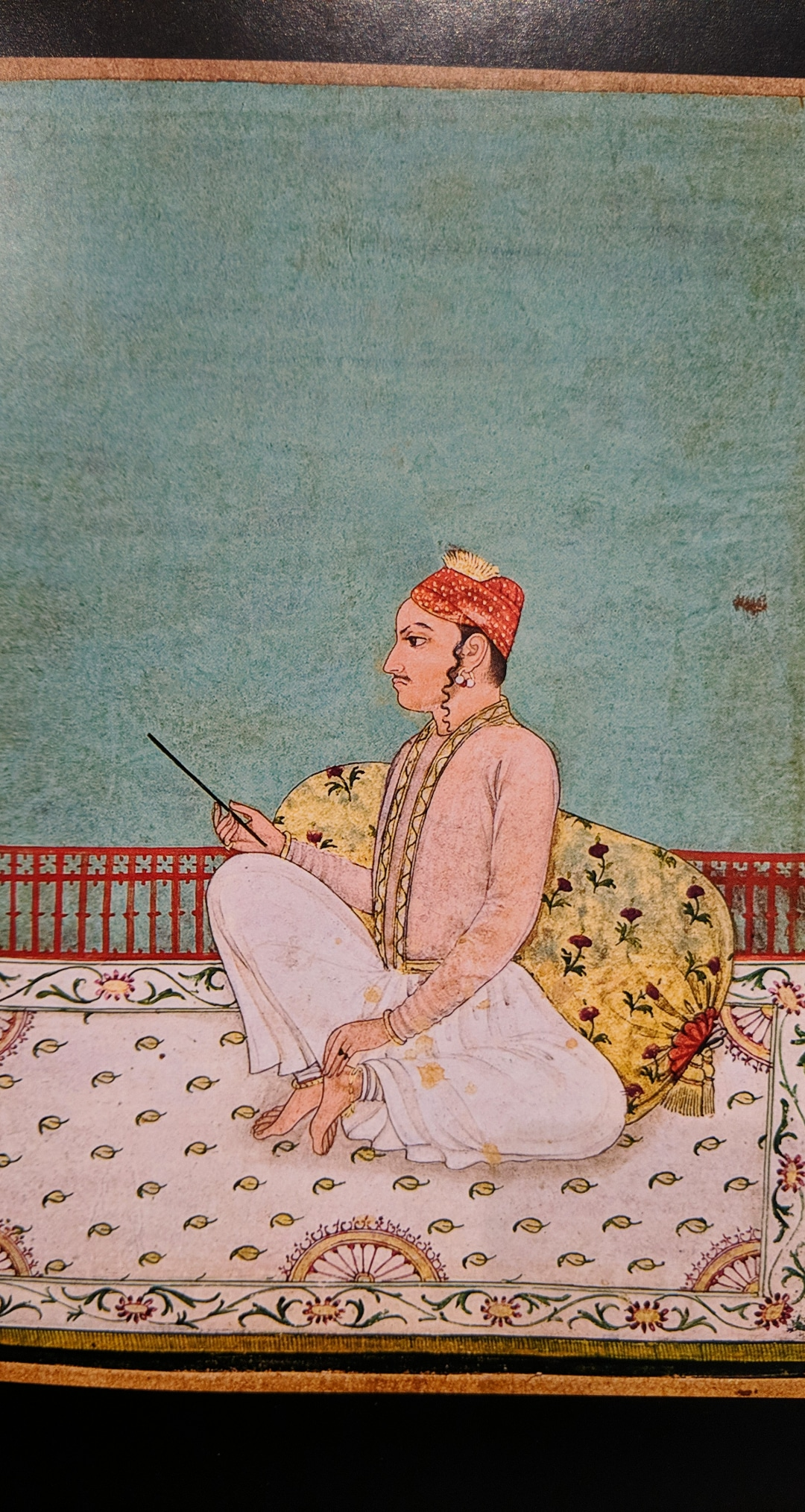
From the Bhai Rupa Collection, depiction of the Guru during adolescence

Guru Gobind Singh had three wives:

- At age 10, he married Jito on 21 June 1677 at Basantgaṛh, 10 km north of Anandpur. The couple had three sons: Jujhar Singh (b. 1691), Zorawar Singh (b. 1696), and Fateh Singh (b. 1699).
- At age 17, he married Sundari on 4 April 1684 at Anandpur. The couple had one son, Ajit Singh (b. 1687).
- At age 33, he married Sahib Devan on 15 April 1700 at Anandpur. They had no children, but she had an influential role in Sikhism. Guru Gobind Singh proclaimed her as the Mother of the Khalsa. The Guru initially rejected her marriage proposal as he was already married and had four sons. The Sangat and the Guru's family agreed to the marriage. However, Guru Gobind Singh made it clear that his relationship with Sahib Diwan will be spiritual and not physical.

The life example and leadership of Guru Gobind Singh have been of historical importance to the Sikhs. He institutionalized the Khalsa (literally, Pure Ones), who played the key role in protecting the Sikh faith long after his death, such as during the nine invasions of Panjab and the attacks by Ahmad Shah Abdali from Afghanistan between 1747 and 1769.

=== Birth name ===
While his birth name is commonly acknowledged as being "Gobind Rai", J.S Grewal and W.H McLeod, among other scholars, point out that hukamnamas and documents issued by his father, Guru Tegh Bahadur, mention him as "Gobind Das". According to McLeod, "Gobind Rai" was an exonym used within Muslim sources.

=== Birth year ===
Whilst the commonly accepted birth year for the guru is 1666, some sources record his birth year as being 1661. Sikhologist Louis E. Fenech believes 1661 is more likely to be the true birth year of the guru as it lines up more reliably with events later in his life regarding his coming-of-age and leadership in 1679. By analyzing Bhai Jaita's Sri Gur Katha, Raj Kumar Hans agrees that a 1661 birth lines up more correctly with later events of the guru, such as in the 1670s regarding the creation of the Khalsa or its precursor. The majority of early writers and sources, such as Chaupa Singh (1700), Kesar Singh Chhibbar (1769), Sarup Das Bhalla (1776), and Sarup Singh Kaushish (1790), places his year of birth in 1661, with only Sukha Singh (1797) placing it in 1666.

== Creation of the Khalsa Panth ==
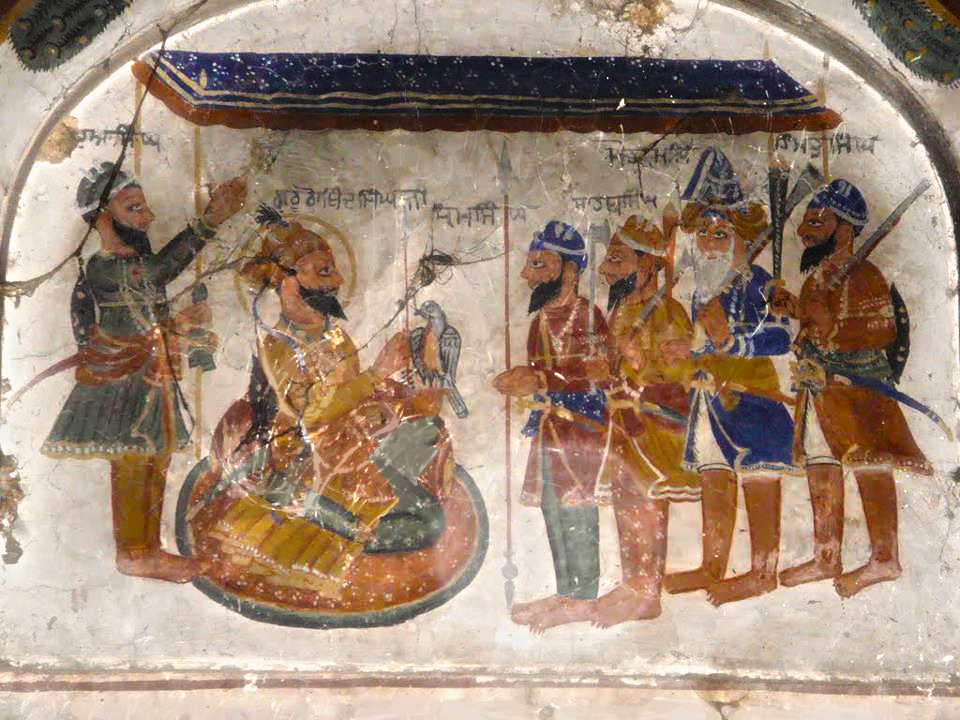
A Fresco of Guru Gobind Singh and The Panj Piare in Gurdwara Bhai Than Singh built in the reign of Maharaja Ranjit Singh

In 1699, Guru Gobind Singh requested the Sikhs to congregate at Anandpur on Vaisakhi (the annual spring harvest festival). According to the Sikh tradition, he asked for a volunteer. One came forward, whom he took inside a tent. The Guru returned to the crowd alone with a bloody sword. He asked for another volunteer and repeated the same process of returning from the tent without anyone and with a bloodied sword four more times. After the fifth volunteer went with him into the tent, the Guru returned with all five volunteers, all safe. He called them the Panj Pyare and the first Khalsa in the Sikh tradition.

Guru Gobind Singh then mixed water and sugar into an iron bowl, stirring it with a double-edged sword to prepare what he called Amrit ("nectar"). He then administered this to the Panj Pyare, accompanied by recitations from the Adi Granth, thus founding the khande ka pahul (baptization ceremony) of a Khalsa – a warrior community. The Guru also gave them a new surname "Singh" (lion). After the first five Khalsa had been baptized, the Guru asked the five to baptize him as a Khalsa. This made the Guru the sixth Khalsa, and his name changed from Guru Gobind Das to Guru Gobind Singh. This initiation ceremony replaced the charan pahul ritual practiced by the previous gurus, in which an initiate would drink the water either the Guru or a masand of the guru had dipped their right toe in.

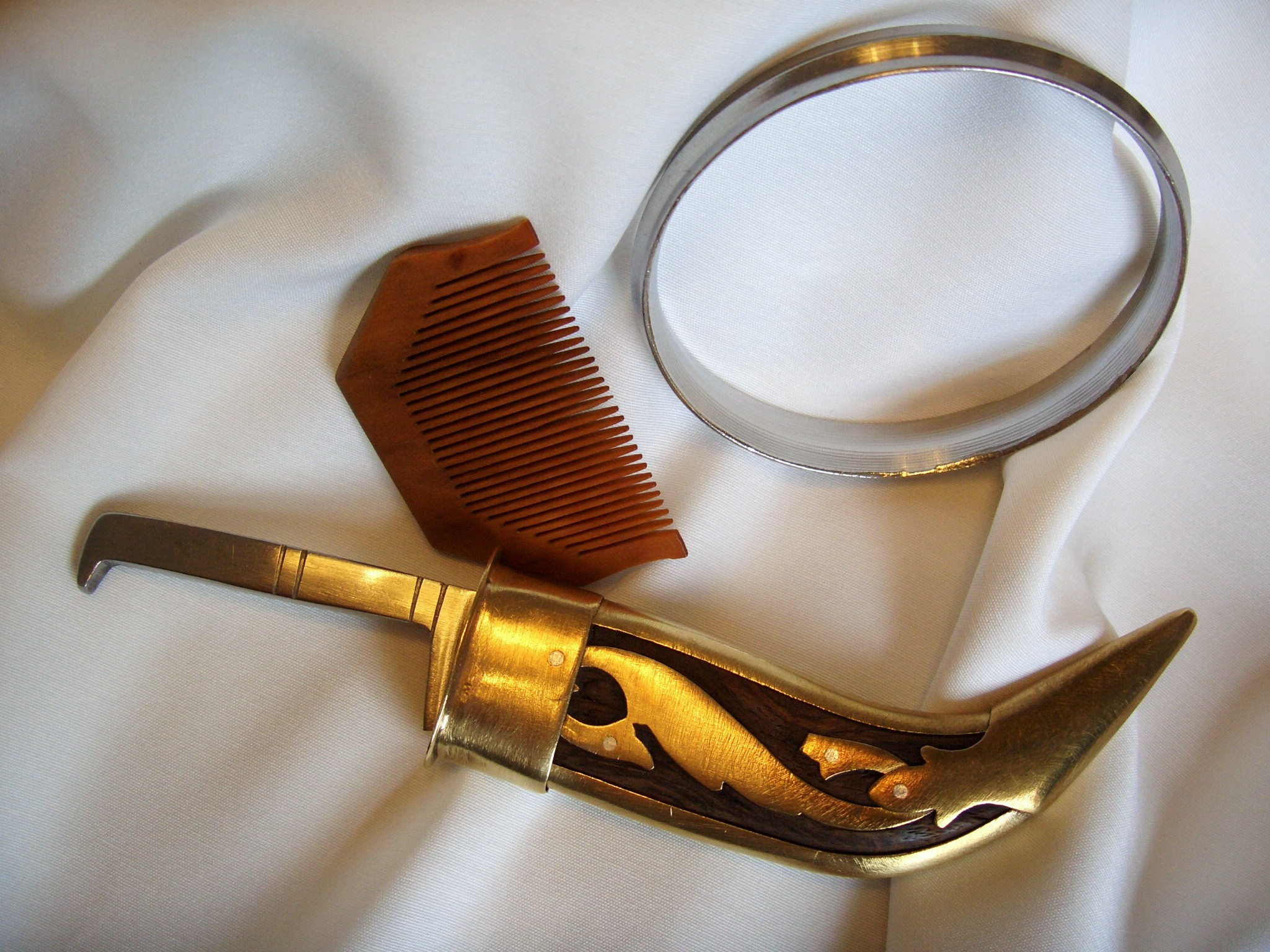
Kanga, Kara and Kirpan – three of the five Ks

Guru Gobind Singh initiated the Five K's tradition of the Khalsa,

- Kesh: uncut hair.
- Kangha: a wooden comb.
- Kara: an iron or steel bracelet worn on the wrist.
- Kirpan: a sword.
- Kacchera: short breeches.

He also announced a code of discipline for Khalsa warriors. Tobacco, eating 'halal' meat (a way of slaughtering in which the animal's throat is slit open and it is left to bleed before being slaughtered), fornication, and adultery were forbidden. The Khalsas also agreed to never interact with those who followed rivals or their successors. The co-initiation of men and women from different castes into the ranks of Khalsa also institutionalized the principle of equality in Sikhism regardless of one's caste or gender. Gobind Singh's significance to the Sikh tradition has been high, for he institutionalized the Khalsa, resisted the ongoing persecution by the Mughal Empire, and continued the defence of dharma—of which he meant "True Religion"—against the assault of Aurangzeb.

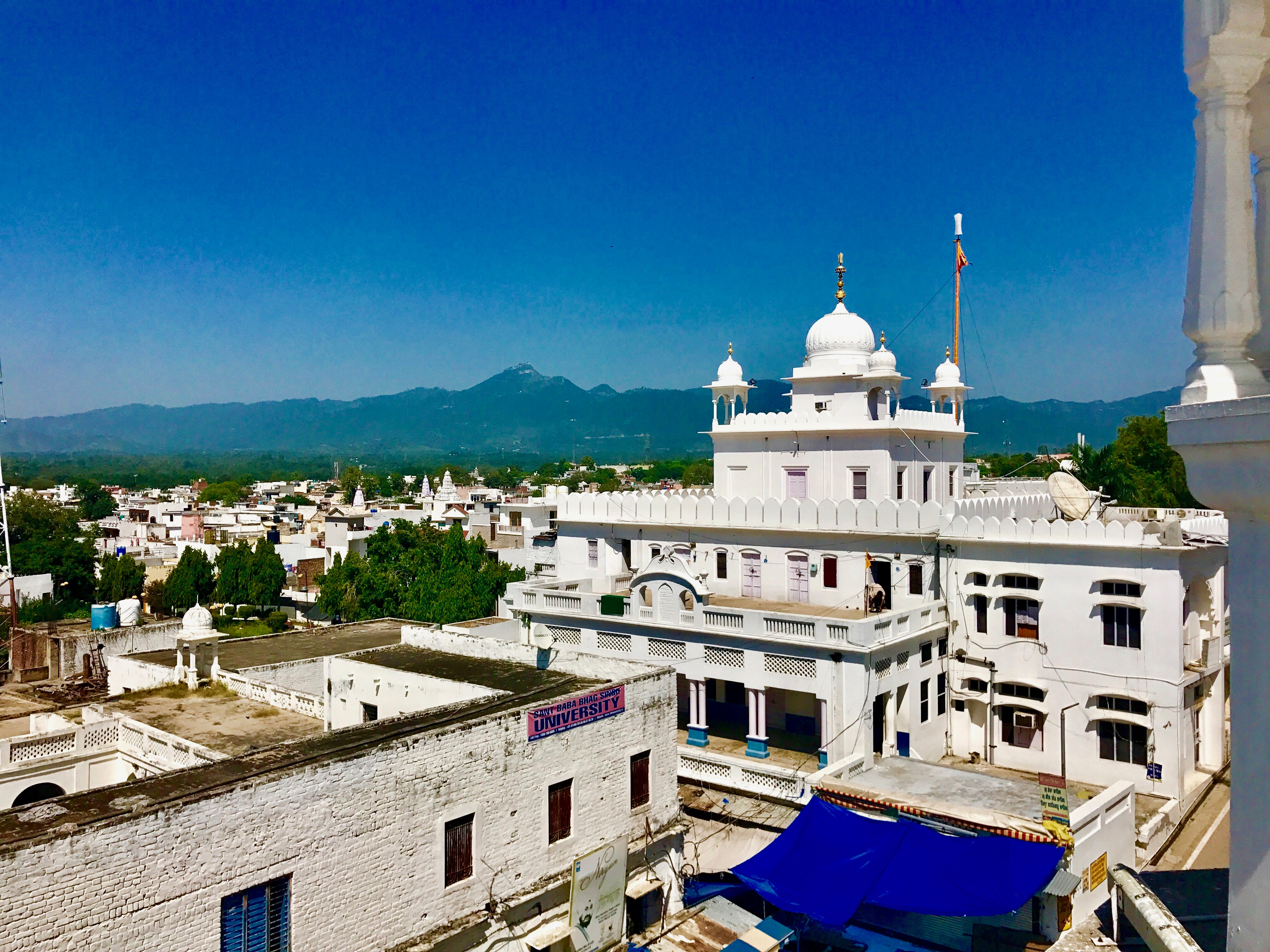
Anandpur Sahib gurdwara, Punjab, the birthplace of Khalsa

He introduced ideas that indirectly challenged the discriminatory taxes imposed by the Mughal authorities. For example, Aurangzeb had imposed taxes on non-Muslims that were collected from the Sikhs as well, the jizya (poll tax on non-Muslims), pilgrim tax, and Bhaddar tax – the last being a tax to be paid by anyone following the Hindu ritual of shaving the head after the death of a loved one and cremation. Guru Gobind Singh declared that Khalsa does not need to continue this practice, because Bhaddar is not dharam, but a bharam (illusion). Not shaving the head also meant not having to pay the taxes by Sikhs who lived in Delhi and other parts of the Mughal Empire. However, the new code of conduct also led to internal disagreements between Sikhs in the 18th century, particularly between the Nanakpanthi and the Khalsa.

Guru Gobind Singh had a deep respect for the Khalsa and stated that there is no difference between the True Guru and the sangat (panth). Before his founding of the Khalsa, the Sikh movement had used the Sanskrit word Sisya (literally, disciple or student), but the favored term thereafter became Khalsa. Additionally, prior to the Khalsa, the Sikh congregations across India had a system of Masands appointed by the Sikh Gurus. The Masands led the local Sikh communities and temples and collected wealth and donations for the Sikh cause. Gobind Singh concluded that the Masands system had become corrupt; he abolished them and introduced a more centralized system with the help of Khalsa, which was under his direct supervision. These developments created two groups of Sikhs, those who initiated as Khalsa, and others who remained Sikhs but did not undertake the initiation. The Khalsa Sikhs saw themselves as a separate religious entity, while the Nanakpanthi Sikhs retained their different perspective.

The Khalsa warrior community tradition started by Guru Gobind Singh has contributed to modern scholarly debate on pluralism within Sikhism. His tradition has survived to contemporary times, with initiated Sikh referred to as Khalsa Sikh, while those who do not get baptized referred to as Sahajdhari Sikhs.

=== Guru Panth ===
Whilst Guru Gobind Singh passed on the mantle of guruship to both the Guru Granth and Guru Panth, the practice of Guru Panth was prevalent in the 18th century during the era of the Sikh Confederacy but fell into obscurity during the rise of Ranjit Singh. Today, Guru Panth is rarely evoked, being overshadowed by the more popular Guru Granth.

== Sikh scriptures ==
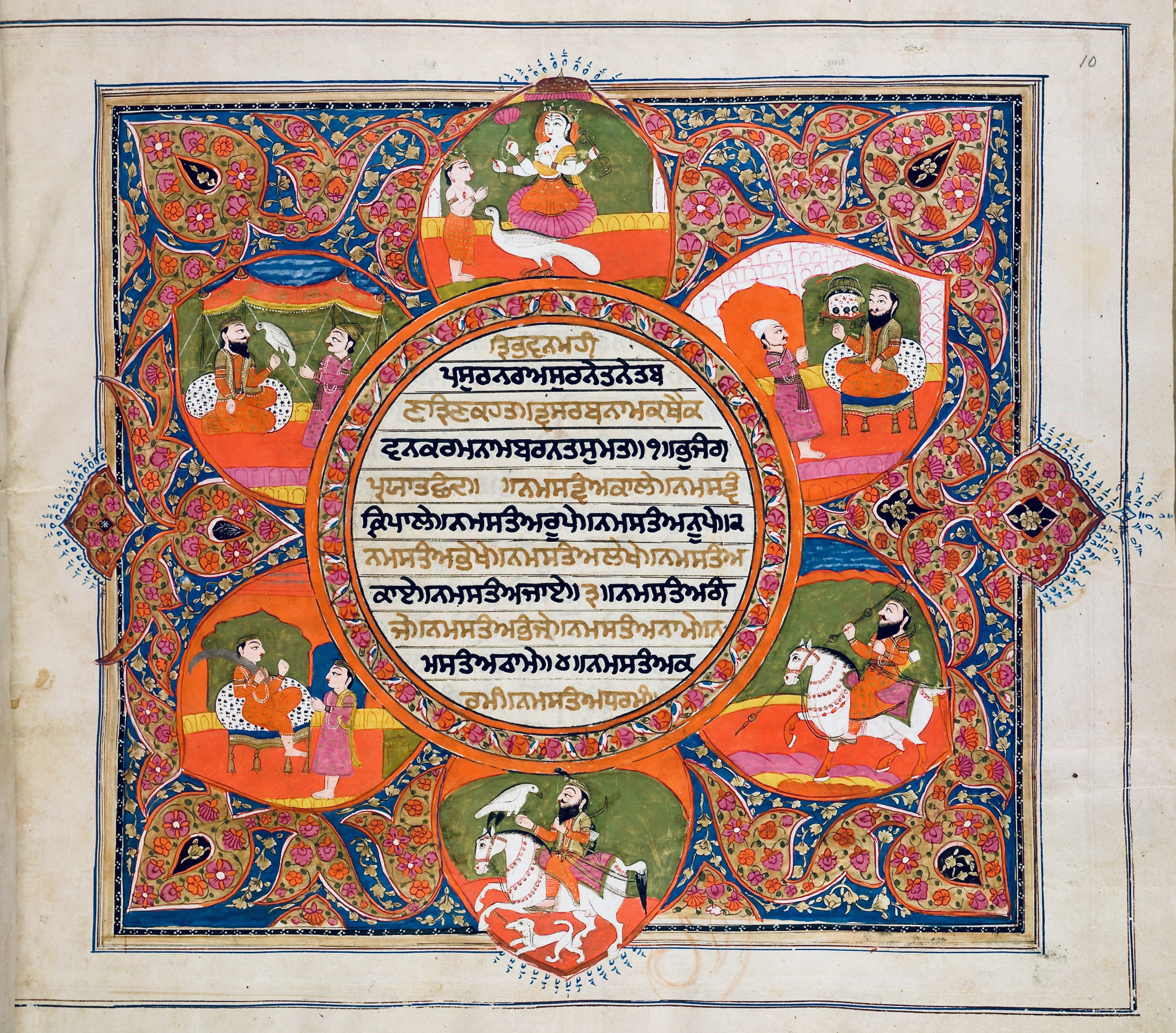
The Dasam Granth is attributed to Guru Gobind Singh. It incorporates among other things the warrior-saint mythologies of ancient India.

Piara Singh Padam in his Sri Guru Gobind Singh Ji de Darbari Ratan highlights that Guru Gobind Singh gave as much regard to the pen as to the sword. At its peak, the Anandpur Darbar boasted over a hundred poets.

Guru Gobind Singh is credited in the Sikh tradition with finalizing the Kartarpur Pothi (manuscript) of the Guru Granth Sahib – the primary scripture of Sikhism. The final version did not accept the extraneous hymns in other versions and included the compositions of his father Guru Tegh Bahadur. Gobind Singh also declared this text to be the eternal Guru for Sikhs.

Guru Gobind Singh is also credited with the Dasam Granth. It is a controversial religious text considered to be the second scripture by some Sikhs, and of disputed authority to other Sikhs. The standard edition of the text contains 1,428 pages with 17,293 verses in 18 sections. The Dasam Granth includes hymns, mythological tales from Hindu texts, a celebration of the feminine in the form of goddess Durga, fables dealing with sexuality, an autobiography, secular stories from the Puranas and the Mahabharata, letters to others such as the Mughal emperor, as well as reverential discussion of warriors and theology.

In his writings, Guru Gobind Singh uses a variety of pen names such as Shyam, Raam, Kaal, Gobind Das, Gobind Singh, Nanak, and Shah Gobind.

According to the Bansavlinama, written in 1769 by Kesar Singh Chibber, Sikhs requested that Gobind Singh merge Dasam Granth with the Guru Granth Sahib. Gobind Singh responded to the request by saying, "This is the Adi Guru Granth; The root book. That one (Dasam Granth) is only for my diversion. Let this be kept in the mind and let the two stay separate."

The Dasam Granth has a significant role in the initiation and the daily life of devout Khalsa Sikhs. Parts of its compositions such as the Jaap Sahib, Tav-Prasad Savaiye and Benti Chaupai are the daily prayers (Nitnem) and sacred liturgical verses used in the initiation of Khalsa Sikhs.

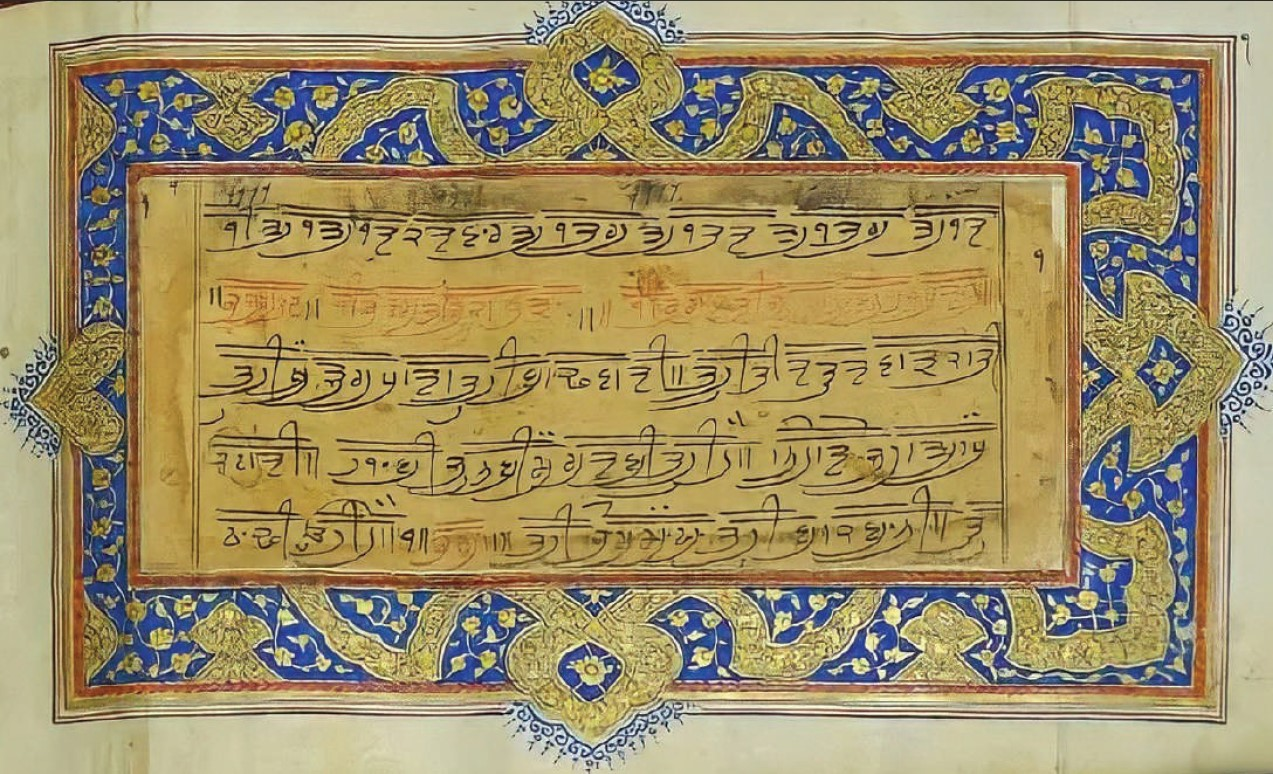
The handwriting of Guru Gobind Singh while writing Gurmukhi. Displayed here is the first chapter of the Charitropakhyan.

== Wars ==
The period following the execution of Guru Tegh Bahadur – the father of Guru Gobind Singh, was a period where the Mughal Empire under Aurangzeb was an increasingly hostile enemy of the Sikh people. The Sikh resisted, led by Guru Gobind Singh, and the Muslim-Sikh conflicts peaked during this period. Both Mughal administration and Aurangzeb's army had an active interest in Guru Gobind Singh. Aurangzeb issued an order to exterminate Guru Gobind Singh and his family.

Guru Gobind Singh believed in a Dharamyudh (war in defence of righteousness), something that is fought as a last resort, neither out of a wish for revenge nor for greed nor for any destructive goals. To the Guru, one must be prepared to die to stop tyranny, end persecution, and to defend one's own religious values. He led fourteen wars with these objectives, but never took captives nor damaged anyone's place of worship.

=== Battles ===
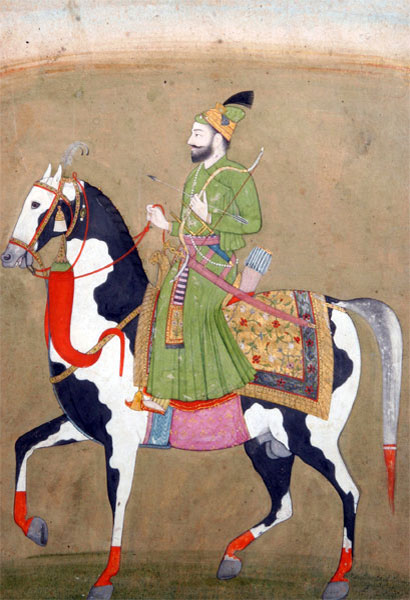
Guru Gobind Singh with his horse

Guru Gobind Singh fought 21 battles against the Mughal Empire and the kings of Siwalik Hills.

- Battle of Anandpur (1682) Bhim Chand attacks Guru Gobind Singh.
- Battle Of Anandpur (1685) Bhim Chand attacks Guru Gobind Singh once again
- Battle of Bhangani (1688), which states chapter 8 of Guru Gobind Singh's Bachittar Natak, when Fateh Shah, along with mercenary commanders Hayat Khan and Najabat Khan, attacked his forces without any purpose. The Guru was aided by the forces of Kripal (his maternal uncle) and a Brahmin named Daya Ram, both of whom he praises as heroes in his text. The Guru's cousin named Sango Shah was killed in the battle, a cousin from Guru Hargobind's daughter.
- Battle of Nadaun (1691), against the Islamic armies of Mian Khan and his son Alif Khan, who were defeated by the allied forces of Guru Gobind Singh, Bhim Chand and other Hindu kings of Himalayan foothills. The non-Muslims aligned to the Guru had refused to pay tribute to the Islamic officials based in Jammu.
- In 1693, Aurangzeb was fighting the Hindu Marathas in the Deccan region of India, and he issued orders that Guru Gobind Singh and Sikhs should be prevented from gathering in Anandpur in large numbers.
- Battle of Anandpur (1694) Dilawar Khan sends his son to attack Anandpur during the night. Terrified of the noises made by the Sikhs, the Mughal forces flee without a fight.
- Battle of Guler (1696), first against the Muslim commander Dilawar Khan's son Rustam Khan, near Sutlej river, where the Guru teamed up with the Hindu king of Guler and routed the Muslim army. The commander sent his general Hussain Khan against the armies of the Guru and the Guler kingdom, a battle was fought near Guler, and Hussain Khan was defeated and killed by the joint forces.

After the creation of the Khalsa, the Hill Rajas, who had previously lost in battle to Guru Gobind Singh, sent a petition to Delhi requesting they act immediately and join them in battle against the Guru.

- Battle of Anandpur (1699), was against two Rajas of the hills.
- Battle of Anandpur (1700), against the Mughal army of Aurangzeb, who had sent 10,000 soldiers, in response to the Hill Rajas letter, under the command of Painda Khan and Dina Beg. In direct combat between Gobind Singh and Painda Khan, the latter was killed. His death led to the Mughal army fleeing the battlefield.
- First siege of Anandpur, The hill Rajas of northern Punjab regrouped after defeat at Anandpur the previous year and resumed their campaign against Gobind Singh, joining forces with Gujar and other tribesmens to besiege Anandpur, northeast of Ludhiana. Gujar leader Jagatullah was killed on the first day and the Rajas were driven off after a brilliant defence led by the Guru's son Ajit Singh.
- Battle of Taragarh was a battle fought in defence during the Siege of Anandpur.
- Battle of Basoli (1702), against the Mughal army; named after the kingdom of Basoli whose Raja Dharampul supported the Guru in the battle. The Mughal army was supported by rival kingdom of Kahlur led by Raja Ajmer Chand. The battle ended when the two sides reached a tactical peace.
- First Battle of Chamkaur (1702), Mughal Army was repulsed.
- First Battle of Anandpur (1704), Mughal Emperor Aurangzeb sent a fresh force into northern Punjab under General Saiyad Khan, later replaced by Ramjan Khan. Ramjan was mortally wounded in further very heavy fighting around the Sikh stronghold at Anandpur, northeast of Ludhiana, and his force again withdrew.
- Second siege of Anandpur, According to scholars, this siege was triggered by the proliferation of armed Sikhs in Anandpur, the increasing numbers creating a shortage of supplies. This led the Sikhs to raid local villages for supplies, food, and forage, which in turn dramatically frustrated the local pahari rajas who forged alliances and mounted an attack on Guru Gobind Singh's patrimony. The Mughal general was fatally wounded by Sikh soldiers, and the army withdrew. Aurangzeb then sent a larger army with two generals, Wazir Khan and Zaberdast Khan in May 1704, to destroy the Sikh resistance. The approach the Islamic army took in this battle was to lay a protracted siege against Anandpur, from May to December, cutting off all food and other supplies moving in and out, along with repeated battles. Some Sikh men deserted the Guru during the Anandpur siege in 1704 and escaped to their homes where their women shamed them and they rejoined the Guru's army and died fighting with him in 1705. Towards the end, the Guru, his family, and followers accepted an offer by Aurangzeb of safe passage out of Anandpur. However, as they left Anandpur in two batches, they were attacked, and one of the batches with Mata Gujari and Guru's two sons – Zorawar Singh aged 8 and Fateh Singh aged 5 – were taken captive by the Mughal army. Both his children were executed by burying them alive into a wall. The grandmother Mata Gujari died there as well.
- Battle of Sarsa (1704), against the Mughal army led by general Wazir Khan; the Muslim commander had conveyed Aurangzeb's promise of a safe passage to Guru Gobind Singh and his family in early December. However, when the Guru accepted the offer and left, Wazir Khan took captives, executed them and pursued the Guru. The retreating troops he was with were repeatedly attacked from behind, with heavy casualties to the Sikhs, particularly while crossing the Sarsa river.
- Battle of Chamkaur (1704) Regarded as one of the most important battles in Sikh history. It was against the Mughal army led by Nahar Khan; the Muslim commander was killed, while on Sikh side the remaining two elder sons of the Guru – Ajit Singh and Jujhar Singh, along with other Sikh soldiers were killed in this battle.
- Battle of Muktsar (1705), the Guru's army was re-attacked by the Mughal army, being hunted down by general Wazir Khan, in the arid area of Khidrana-ki-Dhab. The Mughals were blocked again, but with many losses of Sikh lives – particularly the famous Chalis Mukte (literally, the "forty liberated ones"), and this was the last battle led by Guru Gobind Singh. The place of battle called Khidrana was renamed about a 100 years later by Ranjit Singh to Mukt-sar (literally, "lake of liberation"), after the term "Mukt" (moksha) of the ancient Indian tradition, in honour of those who gave their lives for the cause of liberation.
- Battle of Baghaur (1707) was fought against the Raja of Bhghaur and the locals of the area. It began over a dispute when some camels of the Guru went and ate the trees of a local gardener. The gardener took the camels and the rider hostage. Sikh negotiated for the release but he refused which led to a battle.
- Battle of Jajau (1707) was fought between Azam Shah and Bhadur Shah over the Mughal throne. Bahdur Shah sought Guru Gobind Singh's assistance. Gobind Singh provided assistance and is said to have killed Azam Shah in battle.

=== Mughal accounts ===
The Muslim historians of the Mughal court wrote about Guru Gobind Singh as well as the geopolitics of the times he lived in, and these official Persian accounts were readily available and the basis of colonial era English-language description of Sikh history.

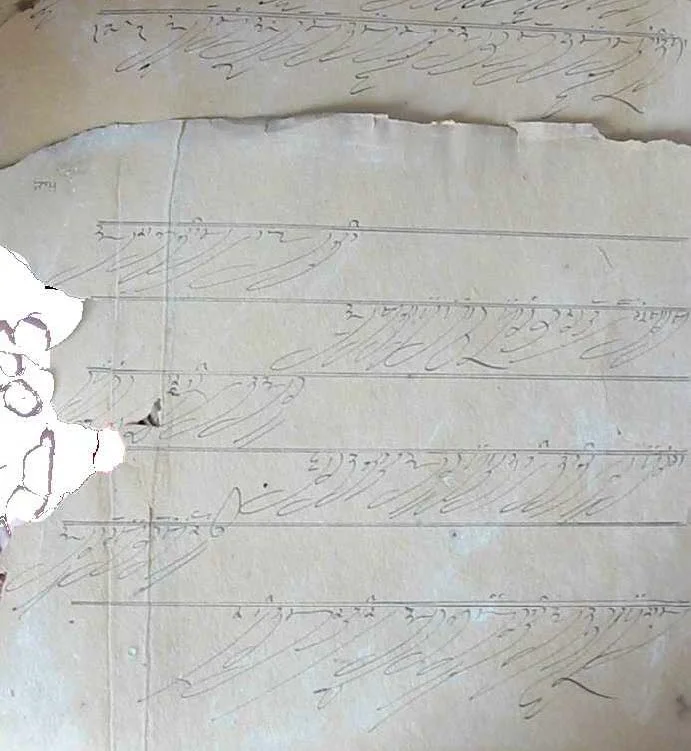
The first page (Panna, or Ang) of the Jaap Sahib, the beginning composition of the Dasam Granth, in the hand of the Guru

According to Dhavan, the Persian texts that were composed by Mughal court historians during the lifetime of Gobind Singh were hostile to him but presented the Mughal perspective. They believed that the religious Guru tradition of Sikhs had been corrupted by him, through the creation of a military order willing to resist the imperial army. Dhavan writes that some Persian writers who wrote decades or a century after the death of Gobind Singh evolved from relying entirely on court histories of the Mughals which disparage the Guru, to including stories from the Sikh gurbilas text that praise the Guru.

The Mughal accounts suggest that the Muslim commanders viewed the Sikh panth as one divided into sects with different loyalties.

=== Relationship with other religious groups ===
As a result of the violent hostility between the Sikhs and the Mughal armies, Guru Gobind Singh ordered the social segregation between the Khalsa and the Muslims, the sentiments of which are reiterated in the contemporary and posthumous rahit-namas. To a lesser extent, injunctions were also made prohibiting the partake in certain Hindu rituals and beliefs as well as against schismatic Sikh factions opposed to the orthodox Khalsa community.

== Post-war years ==
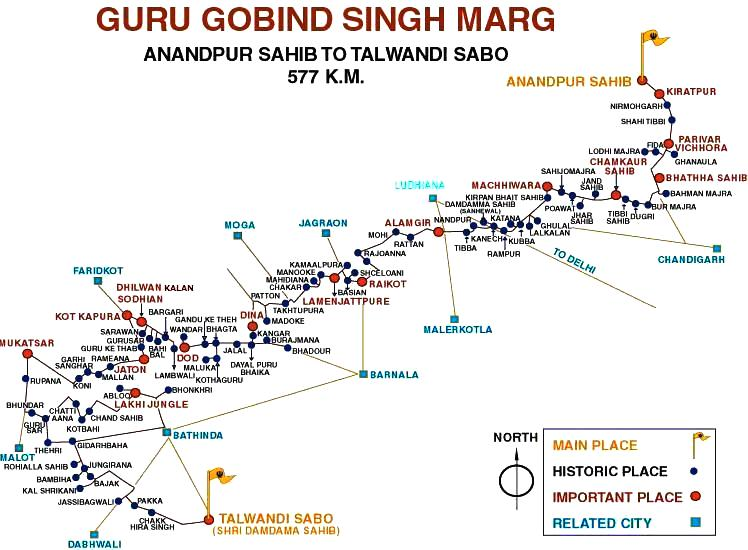
GGS Marg Map

After the Second Battle of Anandpur in 1704, the Guru and his remaining soldiers moved and stayed in different spots including hidden in places such as the Machhiwara jungle of southern Panjab.

Some of the various spots in north, west, and central India where the Guru lived after 1705, include Hehar with Kirpal Das (maternal uncle), Manuke, Mehdiana, Chakkar, Takhtupura, and Madhe and Dina (Malwa region). He stayed with relatives or trusted Sikhs such as the three grandsons of Rai Jodh, a devotee of Guru Har Gobind.

=== Zafarnama ===
Guru Gobind Singh saw the war conduct of Aurangzeb and his army against his family and his people as a betrayal of a promise, unethical, unjust, and impious. After all of Gobind Singh's children had been killed by the Mughal army and the battle of Muktsar, the Guru wrote a defiant letter in Persian to Aurangzeb, titled Zafarnama (literally, "epistle of victory"), a letter which the Sikh tradition considers important towards the end of the 19th century.

The Guru's letter was stern yet conciliatory to Aurangzeb. He indicted the Mughal Emperor and his commanders in spiritual terms, and accused them of a lack of morality both in governance and in the conduct of war. The letter predicted that the Mughal Empire would soon end, because it persecutes, and is full of abuse, falsehood, and immorality. The letter is spiritually rooted in Gobind Singh's beliefs about justice and dignity without fear.

== Death of family members ==
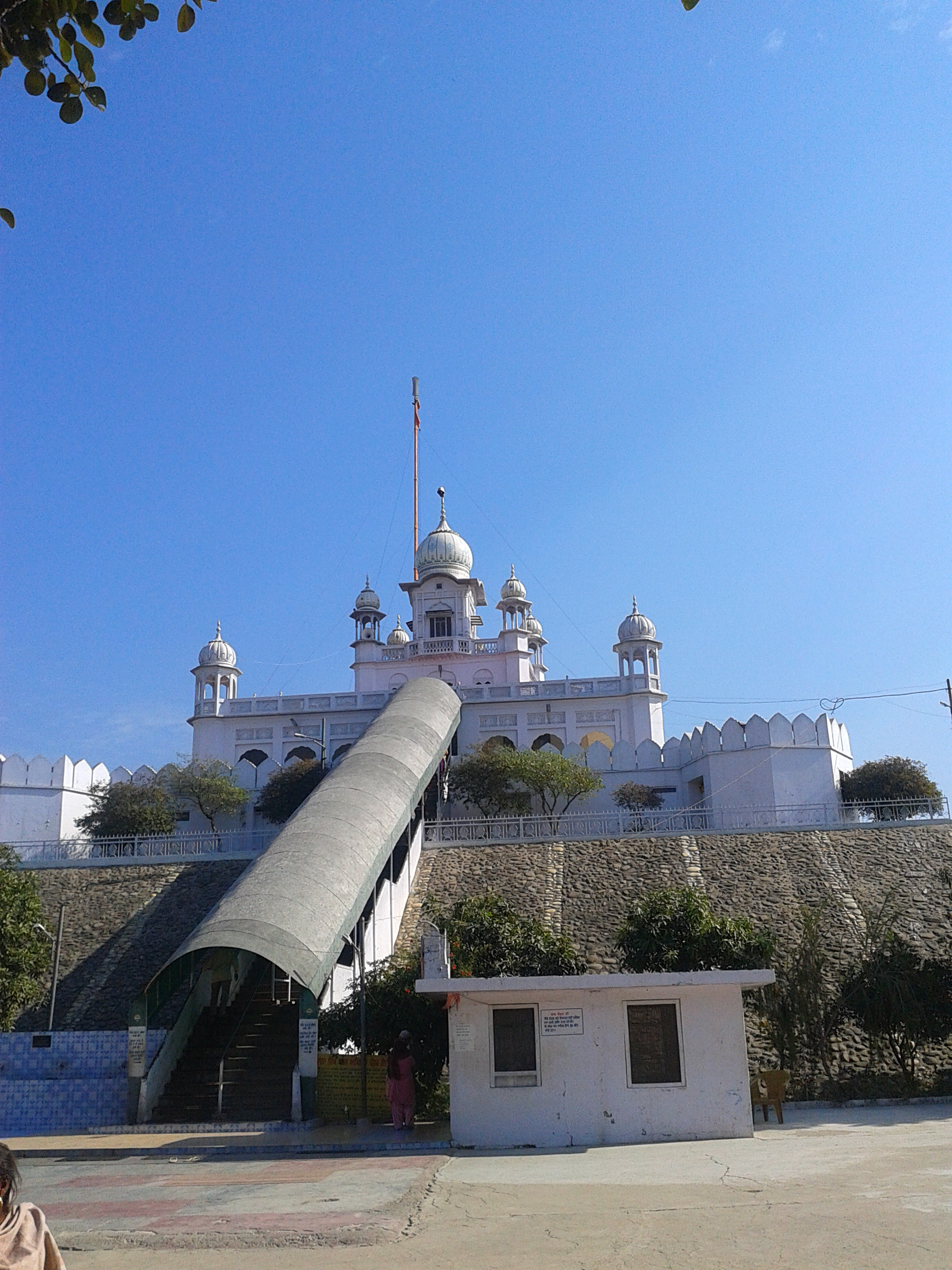
Gurudwara Parivar Vichora Sahib, Majri, Punjab where Guru's mother and younger sahibzaade got separated from him

Guru Gobind Singh's four sons, also referred to as Chaar Sahibzaade (the four princes), were killed during his lifetime – the elder two in a battle with Mughals, and the younger two executed by the Mughal governor of Sirhind. The Guru and his two elder sons had escaped the siege of Anandpur in December 1704 and reached Chamkaur, but they were pursued by a large Mughal army. In the ensuing battle, Guru's elder sons, also called the 'Vaade Sahibzaade' fought bravely, but the Mughal army was much larger and well equipped. While the Guru was taken to a safe place, his elder sons, Sahibzada Ajit Singh aged 17, and Jujhar Singh aged 13 were killed in the Battle of Chamkaur in December 1704 against the Mughal army.

Gobind Singh's mother Mata Gujri and his two younger sons got separated from him after escaping the Mughal siege of Anandpur in December 1704; and were later arrested by the forces of Wazir Khan, the Mughal governor of Sirhind. The younger pair, called the 'Chotte Sahibzaade', along with their grandmother were imprisoned in an Open Tower (Thanda Burj), in chilling winter days. Around 26 and 27 December 1704, the younger sons, Sahibzada Fateh Singh aged 6 and Zorawar Singh aged 9, were offered a safe passage if they converted to Islam, which they refused; and subsequently, Wazir Khan ordered them to be bricked alive in the wall. Gujri fainted on hearing about her grandsons' death and died shortly thereafter.

His adopted son Zorawar Singh Palit whose real name is unknown died in 1708 near Chittorgarh Fort in a skirmish with local soldiers. According to Sainapati, Zorawar Singh Palit had managed to escape in the Battle of Chamkaur and later met the Guru in Rajputana after which he got in a minor scuffle at Chittorgarh and died.

According to Sikh historians, Guru Gobind Singh took the harsh news about the execution of his sons, Fateh Singh and Zorawar Singh, with stoic calm, and wrote "What use is it to put out a few sparks when you raise a mighty flame instead?".

== Death ==
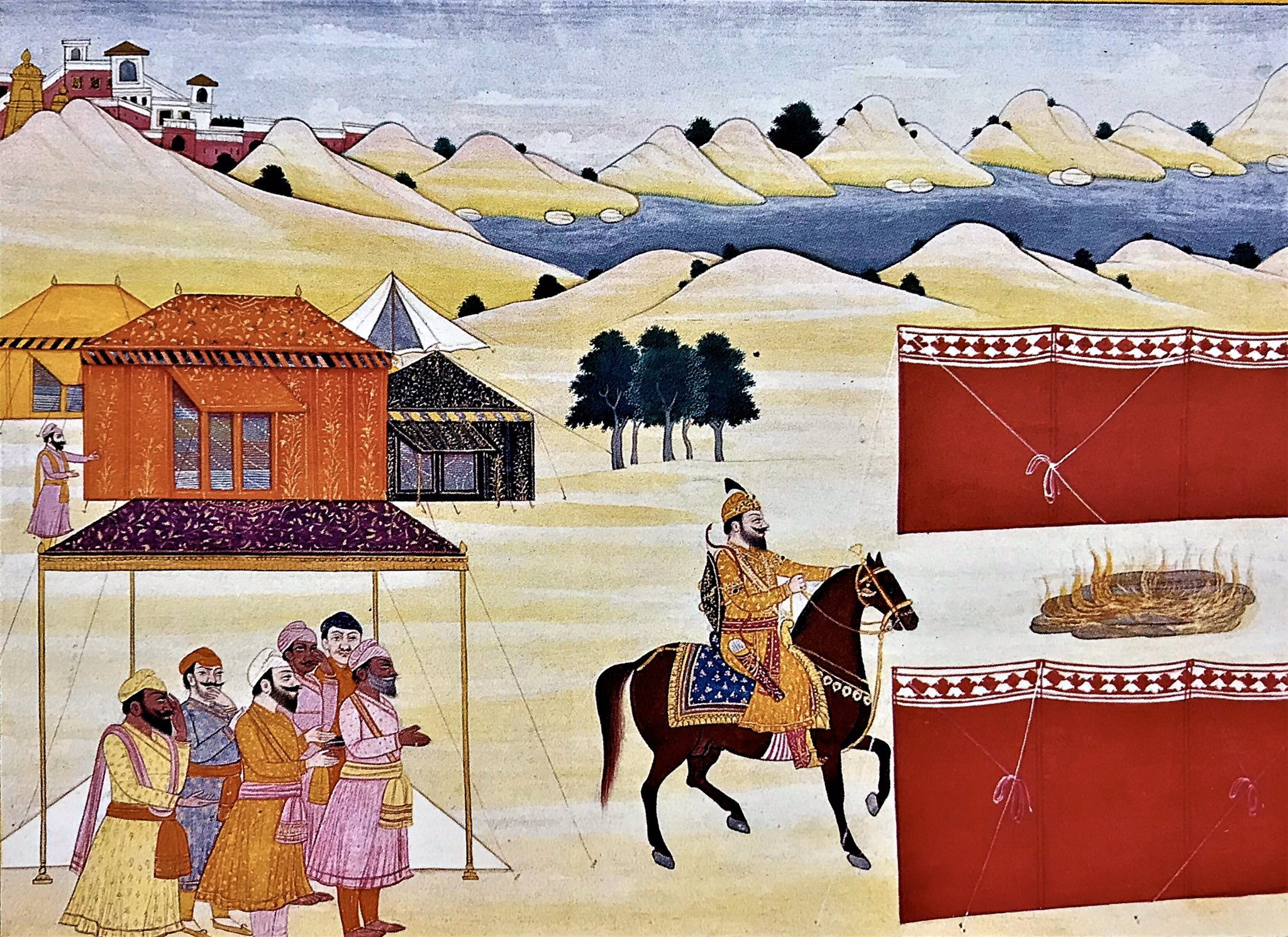
Cremation of Guru Gobind Singh at Nanded

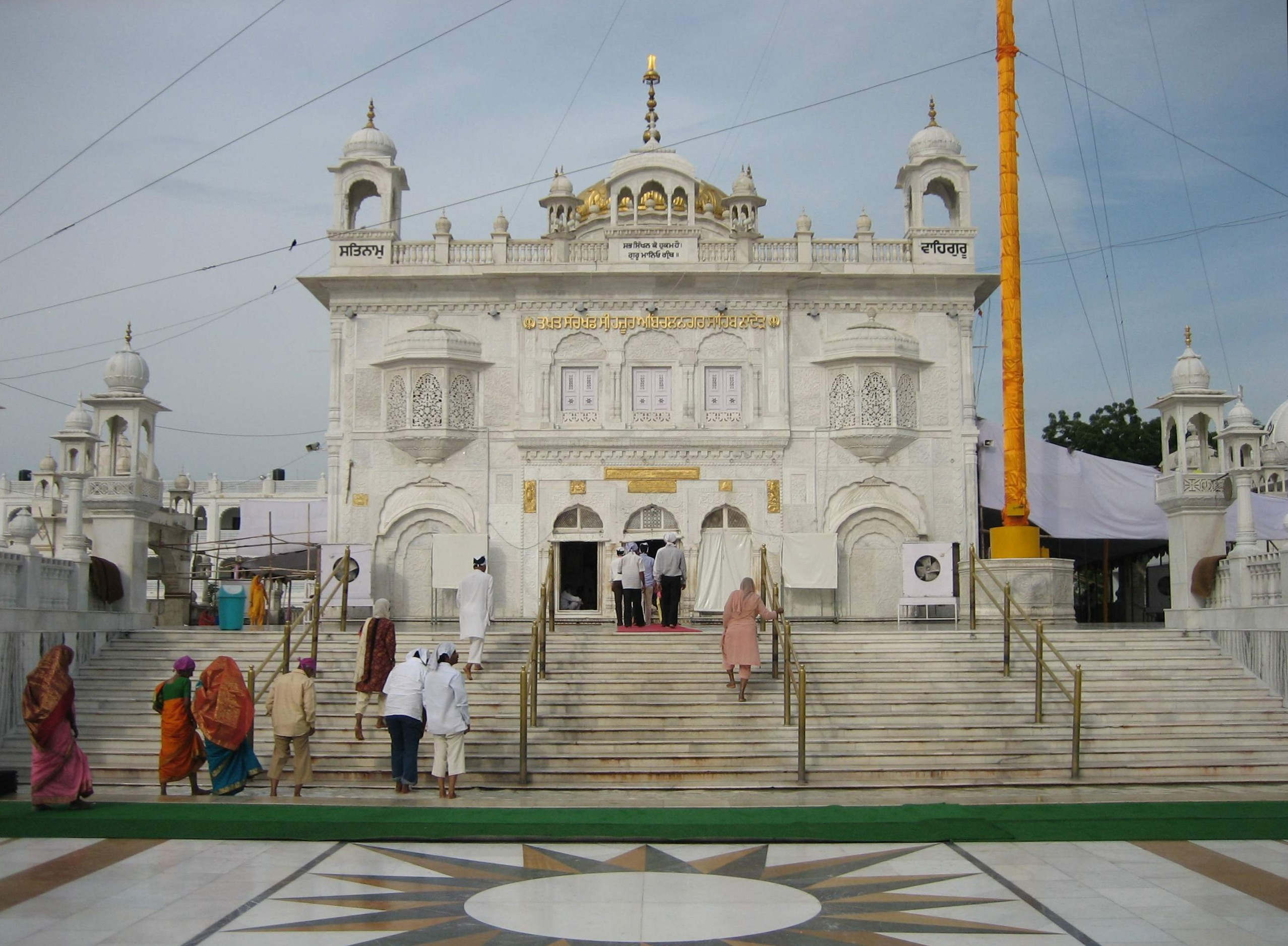
Takht Sri Hazur Sahib, Nanded, built over the place where Guru Gobind Singh was cremated in 1708. The inner chamber is called Angitha Sahib.

Aurangzeb died in 1707, and immediately a succession war began between his sons who attacked each other. Guru Gobind Singh supported Bahadur Shah I in the Battle of Jajau by sending 200–300 Sikhs under Bhai Dharam Singh and later joining the battle themselves. According to Sikh sources it was Guru Gobind Singh who killed Azam Shah, while according to Mughal sources, it was Isa Khan Munj. The official successor Bahadur Shah invited Guru Gobind Singh with his army to meet him in person in the Deccan region of India for reconciliation. Guru Gobind Singh hoped to get Anandpur, his former stronghold back, and remained close to the imperial camp for nearly a year. His appeals for the restoration of his lands turned out to be ineffectual however as Bahadur Shah went on postponing any restoration to the status quo ante as he was not willing to offend either the Guru or the hill rajas.

Wazir Khan, a Mughal army commander and the Nawab of Sirhind, against whose army the Guru had fought several wars, commissioned two Afghans, Jamshed Khan, and Wasil Beg, to follow the Guru's army as it moved for the meeting with Bahadur Shah, and then assassinate the Guru. The two secretly pursued the Guru whose troops were in the Deccan area of India, and entered the camp when the Sikhs had been stationed near river Godavari for months. They gained access to the Guru and Jamshed Khan stabbed him two times resulting in a fatal wound at Nanded. Some scholars state that the assassin who killed Guru Gobind Singh may not have been sent by Wazir Khan, but was instead sent by the Mughal army that was staying nearby.

According to Senapati's Sri Gur Sobha, an early 18th-century writer, the fatal wounds of the Guru was one below his heart. The Guru fought back and killed the assassin, while the assassin's companion was killed by the Sikh guards as he tried to escape.

The Guru died of his wounds a few days later on 7 October 1708. (Note: However Hardip Singh Syan gives the date as 18 October 1708.) His death fuelled a long and bitter war of the Sikhs with the Mughals.

According to the Bansavalinama by Kesar Singh Chibber written in 1769, the Guru's last words were, "The Granth is the Guru and it will bring you to Akal. The Guru is the Khalsa and the Khalsa is the Guru. The seat has been given to Sri Sahib Mata Devi. Love each other and expand the community. Follow the words of the Granth. The Sikh that follows Sikhi shall be with the Guru. Follow the conduct of the Guru. Always remain with Waheguru."

== Dohra Mahalla Dasvan (10) ==
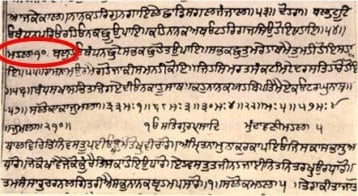
Dohra of Guru Gobind Singh, as recorded in a copy of an Adi Granth, dated 1707 CE and autographed (containing a 'nisan') by Guru Gobind Singh, where 'Dohra' Mahalla 10 (Dasvan) is included. This is given as evidence of Guru Gobind Singh being the author of a Dohra (rhyming couplet) line contained at the end of the scripture on p. 1429.

While it is generally believed that Guru Gobind Singh did not add any of his own compositions to the Guru Granth Sahib, there are some who argue that a single rhyming couplet, known as a Dohra, of the tenth Guru, titled Dohra Mahalla Dasvan (10), near the end of the scripture on page 1429 is the work of Guru Gobind Singh.

The composition in-question is as follows:

ਮਹਲਾ ੧੦:
Mahalla 10:
ਬਲੁ ਹੋਆ ਬੰਧਨ ਛੁਟੇ ਸਭੁ ਕਿਛੁ ਹੋਤ ਉਪਾਇ ॥
My strength has been restored, and my bonds have been broken; now, I can do everything.
ਨਾਨਕ ਸਭੁ ਕਿਛੁ ਤੁਮਰੈ ਹਾਥ ਮੈ ਤੁਮ ਹੀ ਹੋਤ ਸਹਾਇ ॥੫੪॥
Nanak: everything is in Your hands, Lord; You are my Helper and Support. ||54||

According to Trilochan Singh, Guru Tegh Bahadur sent a letter in the form of a sloka to the young Gobind Das while incarcerated in Delhi by Aurangzeb, delivered personally to the young child by Bhai Uda and Pundit Kirpa Ram:

All human power has failed,
Humanity groans in chains;
Moral efforts are of no avail;
Lord, save them O save
With Thy Merciful aid,
As Thou didst save
The drowning elephant that prayed!

— Guru Tegh Bahadur, Guru Granth Sahib

It was a test of the potential successor to the Guruship. Gobind Das, who was writing from Anandpur, replied with a dohra, which affirmed his readiness to succeed as the next Sikh guru and calmed any apprehensions that the Sikhs of the time felt about the prospect. Guru Tegh Bahadur knew his son was prepared to the take the reins and lead the Sikh community after his death. After reading his son's reply, Guru Tegh Bahadur sent a final message to his son:

The Word of God shall ever abide,
The Saints shall ever survive;
Guru Gobind’s glory shall ever remain;
Few and rare are those O Nanak,
Who contemplate His Name

— Guru Tegh Bahadur, Guru Granth Sahib

This story is recorded in the account of Bhai Mani Singh written in his Sikhan di Bhagat Mal composition. The story is further recounted in other historical sources, such as Suraj Prakash, Mehma Prakash, and Kesar Singh Chibber's Bansavalinama. The SGPC, for unknown reasons, decided to not ascribe the dohra to Guru Gobind Singh when it standardized the Guru Granth Sahib, which it subsequently publishes without it, despite the dohra being ascribed to the tenth Guru in many 17th and 18th century manuscripts of the Guru Granth Sahib, including many of which bear a signature of the tenth Guru.

== Factional views ==
=== Namdhari ===
The Namdhari sect believes that Guru Gobind Singh did not die in 1708 but rather continued to live on under the alias and pseudonym of 'Ajapal Singh' and passed on the guruship to Balak Singh at the age of 146 in the year 1812.

=== Radha Soami ===
Some of the Radha Soami movement, a contemporary Sant Mat tradition, have linked Guru Gobind Singh, and therefore the lineage of Sikh gurus, to Tulsi Sahib of Hathras by claiming that Guru Gobind Singh passed on leadership to a supposed individual named Ratnagar Rao, who then passed on the mastership to Tulsi Sahib of Hathras. The group postulates that Guru Gobind Singh visited a ruling family of Peshwas whilst he was in the Deccan Plateau, which is how Tulsi Sahib became acquainted with the Sikh guru after he stayed with the family. There is no evidence that Ratnagar Rao existed; this claim likely originated with Kirpal Singh to connect the Radha Soami movement to Sikhism. A connection between Guru Gobind Singh and Tulsi Sahib is not widely accepted by Radha Soami branches aside from the Ruhani Satsang branch.

== In popular culture ==
Indian films about Guru Gobind Singh include:

- Sarbans Dani Guru Gobind Singh is a 1998 Indian Punjabi-language drama film directed by Ram Maheshwari. He is not directly portrayed by an actor.
- Chaar Sahibzaade, a 2014 Indian computer-animated film by Harry Baweja, is about his sons Ajit Singh, Jujhar Singh, Zorawar Singh, and Fateh Singh.
- Chaar Sahibzaade: Rise of Banda Singh Bahadur, a 2016 Indian computer-animated film by Harry Bawej, is a sequel to Chaar Sahibzaade about Baba Banda Singh Bahadur's rebellion against the Mughal Empire.

== See also ==
- List of places named after Guru Gobind Singh
- The 52 Hukams of Guru Gobind Singh
- Bhai Jiwan Singh
- Banda Singh Bahadur

Preceded by Guru Tegh Bahadur	Sikh Guru; 11 November 1675 – 7 October 1708	Succeeded by Guru Granth Sahib
