= Jujhar Singh =

Sikh martyr (1691–1704)

Sahibzada Baba Jujhar Singh Ji
- ਜੁਝਾਰ ਸਿੰਘ, ਸਾਹਿਬਜ਼ਾਦਾ
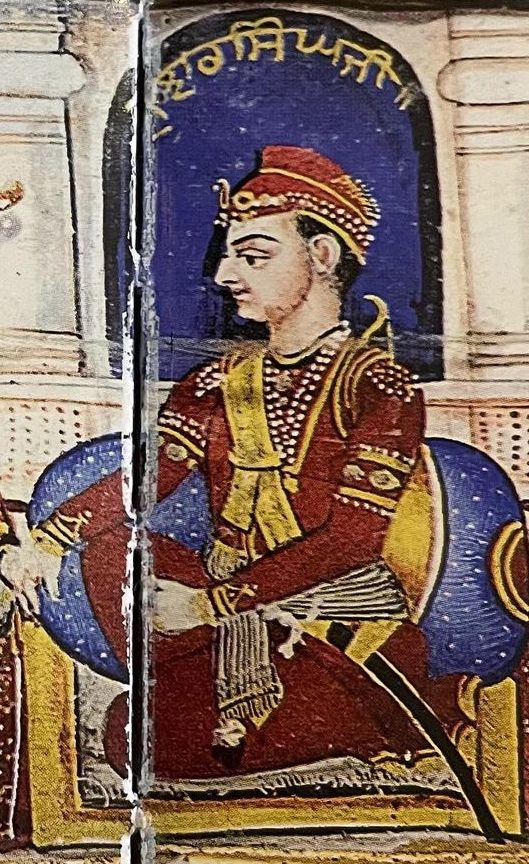
- Detail of Sahibzada Jujhar Singh from a mural depicting Guru Gobind Singh and his four sons (the Sahibzadas) located within Takht Hazur Sahib
- Title: Sahibzada

Personal life
- Born: 14 March 1691 Anandpur Sahib, Punjab
- Died: 23 December 1704 (aged 13)
- Cause of death: Killed in Action
- Parents: Guru Gobind Singh (father); Mata Jito (mother)
- Known for: Battle of Chamkaur
- Relatives: Ajit Singh (half-brother) Zorawar Singh (brother) Fateh Singh (brother)

Religious life
- Religion: Sikhism

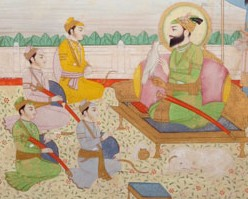
Jujhar Singh with his father (right) and brothers

Jujhar Singh (Punjabi: ਸਾਹਿਬਜ਼ਾਦਾ ਜੁਝਾਰ ਸਿੰਘ, pronunciation: [säːɦɪbd͡ʒäːd̪ɛ d͡ʒʒjäːɝ sɪ́ŋgᵊ]; 9 April 1691 – 23 December 1704), the second son of Gobind Singh, was born to Mata Jito at Anandpur Sahib. This event is now celebrated on April 9 each year according to the Nanakshahi Calendar.

== Biography ==
Jujhar Singh was born on March 14, 1691, in Anandpur Sahib, Punjab. His parents were Guru Gobind Singh and Mata Jito, with Jujhar Singh being the guru's second son. He received training from Jiwan Singh (Bhai Jaita) in warfare. He died in battle during the Second Battle of Chamkaur. He was only 14 when he met his martyrdom after watching his brother's death.

== Legacy ==
Sikh hagiographer, Rattan Singh Bhangu, compared Jujhar Singh's sacrifice at the Battle of Chamkaur to the death of Abhimanyu in the Mahabharata epic, as both fought and died defending their father. He writes Jujhar Singh as thinking the following whilst engaging the Mughal forces in battle: "How can a son live while his father confronts death in battle?"

== See also ==
- Ajit Singh
- Zorawar Singh
- Fateh Singh
- Martyrdom in Sikhism
