= First siege of Anandpur =

1701 battle during the Mughal-Sikh Wars

First Siege of Anandpur
- Part of Hill States-Sikh Wars
Date	29 August – 3 October 1700 (1 month and 4 days)
Location	Anandpur
Result	Hill Raja victory

Belligerents
Khalsa (Sikhs)	Alliance of the Hill States of Sivalik Hills (Note: Comprises the states: Jammu, Mandi, Bhutan, Nurpur, Kullu, Keonthal, Guler, Chamba, Srinagar, Hindur, Dadhwal, Jaswan, Bilaspur, Kangra, Bijarwal, Darauil, Sirmur, and six other unknown rajas. Also included local tribesmen and villagers belonging to the Gujar and Ranghar castes.): Gujars; Ranghars

Commanders and leaders
Guru Gobind Singh; Bhai Daya Singh; Bhai Dharam Singh; Bhai Mohkam Singh; Bhai Himmat Singh; Bhai Sahib Singh; Bhai Uday Singh; Bhai Bachitter Singh; Bhai Jivan Singh	Raja Bhim Chand; Raja Ajmer Chand; General Jagatullah †; Raja Kesari Chand †; Raja Ghumand Chand †; Raja Bhup Chand

Strength
4,000	Unknown

Casualties and losses
Unknown	More than 5000 were killed; Jagatullah was killed by Bhai Sahib Singh.; Kesari Chand was killed by Bhai Uday Singh.; Ghumand Chand was killed by Bhai Himmat Singh.; Intoxicated war elephant was killed by Bhai Bachittar Singh

The first siege of Anandpur was a thirty-five-day-long siege at Anandpur led by the Rajas of the Sivalik Hills and the Gujar and Ranghar tribesmen against the armies of the Sikh under Guru Gobind Singh.

== Prelude ==
The hill Rajas were concerned about Guru Gobind Singh's rising power and influence in their region. The Mughal generals had failed to subdue the Guru in the Battle of Anandpur (1700). The Rajas appealed to Mughal emperor Aurangzeb to aid them. Raja Bhup Chand of Hundar opposed seeking the aid of the emperor. He insisted the Rajas should be able to win themselves. The Rajas of hill states, Jammu, Nurpur, Mandi, Bhutan, Kullu, Keonthal, Guler, Chamba, Garhwal, Dadhwal, Hindur, Jaswan, Bilaspur, Kangra, Bijarwal, Darauli, and Sirmur, met in council under Ajmer Chand. Ajmer Chand convinced the council to follow him. Ajmer Chand recruited the Gujjars and Ranghars, both of whom had previous hostilities with the Gurus. They were led by Jagatullah.

Ammunition was distributed amongst the Rajas, and they began to march at night.

They sent a letter to the Guru, asking him to pay the arrears of rent for Anandpur (which lay in Ajmer Chand's territory) or leave the city. The Guru insisted that the land was bought by his father and was his property.

Duni Chand led five hundred men from Majha region to assist the Guru. Reinforcements from other areas also arrived to help the Guru.

== Battle ==
=== Day two ===
In the early morning of day two, the Sikhs fired cannons and musket at the camps of the Rajas which forced them to move back.

Next day, Ajmer Chand launched a fierce attack on Fatehgarh with a do-or-die mentality. Fatehghar was still in construction with one of its walls only being half made. Bhagwan SIngh was one of the commanders of the fort. A five-hour battle ensued where many soldiers on both sides died. Bhagwan Singh died in this battle.

Other attacks ensued all throughout the day. Ajit Singh launched a counterattack in the afternoon. More than 500 Sikhs joined this counterattack. Ajit Singh's horse was killed, but he continued to fight. The troops of the alliance began to retreat, but Raja Kesari Chand managed to rally his troops and they stood their ground. Following this, the alliance of the Rajas, Gujars, and Ranghars decided to wait out the Sikh.

=== Day three ===
Fighting resumed as early as dawn in certain places. Ajmer Chand, after the previous day's success, attacked Anandpur. The attack lasted all day and spilled into the next day. This attack was a disaster for Ajmer Chand, but Sikh veteran generals such as Bagh Singh and Gharbar Singh fell in the battle.

Ajmer Chand decided to call another council of the Rajas. The Raja of Mandi insisted on peace, but his requests were dismissed. It was decided that the Rajas should put their focus on capturing Lohgarh.

=== Siege continued ===
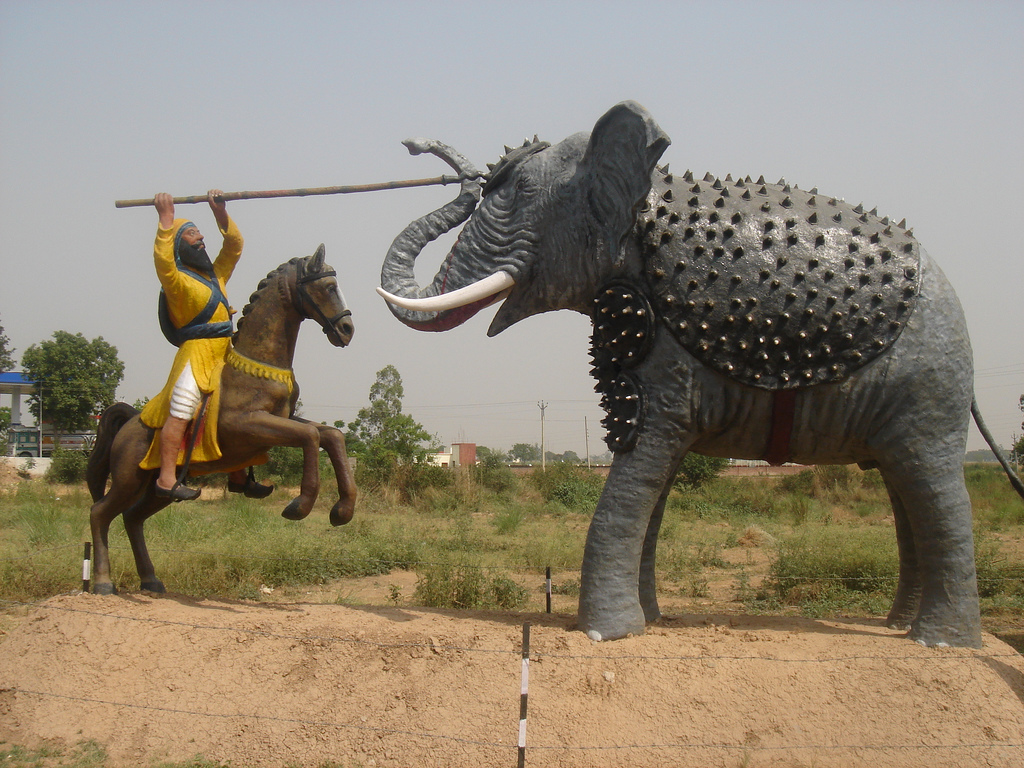
A depiction of Bhai Bachitter Singh killing the drunk elephant set by Mughal forces on the Sikh forces in the battlefield with Nagni Barcha (cobra lance) given by Guru Gobind Singh Ji. This photo was taken outside the Sikh History Museum on way from Mohali to Sirhind

The Rajas had decided to starve out the Sikhs, but were tired of waiting and planned to execute their elephant plan. Duni Chand hearing rumors an elephant would attack and hearing Guru Gobind Singh comment that Duni Chand is the elephant of the Sikh army grew wary. At night, Duni Chand and his troops ran away and deserted the Guru. Duni Chand and his troops decided to go to Dhir Mal.

The next day, the army commanded by Ajmer Chand positioned themselves outside of Lohgarh. The Rajas had planned to send one intoxicated Prasadi elephant to Lohgarh in hopes it would break the gates of the fort. The entirety of the war elephant except its tip was covered in steel.

The elephant was hit, and it went into a rageful fury to Lohgarh. Behind the elephant charged the army of the Hill Rajas. Guru Gobind Singh asked Bhai Bachitar Singh to become his elephant to which he agreed. He was given a nagini barcha (cobra lance) and took the Gurus blessings. Bachitarr Singh was ready to face the drunken elephant. Next Udai Singh took the blessings of the Guru and was given a sword to kill Kesari Chand. Udai Singh charged and slaughtered his way through the soldiers to get to his target.

The elephant had made its way to the gates of the fort. It had killed many Sikhs. Bachittar Singh opened the gates of the fort. He raised his lance and pierced the elephant through the armor, wounding it. The elephant turned around and killed many soldiers of the Hill Rajas and was unstoppable.

As this happened, Udai Singh met Kesari Chand. He shouted, "Kesari Chand come and hit". Kesari Chand hit but missed. Udai Singh chopped Chand's head off. He put the head on a spear and raised it up high as he made his way back to the gates of the fort. Mokham Singh soon after finished the elephant off. Bhai Sahib Singh injured the Raja of Handur and the army of the Raja's retreated.

=== Last attack ===
The Hill Rajas once again held a council and peace was considered, but was not taken.

On the following day, the troops of Raja Ghumand Chand of Kangra attacked Anandpur. A bloody battle happened. Ghumand Chand's horse was shot by Alam Singh. A melee happened around the Raja. His men managed to keep the Sikh at bay temporarily. The battle lasted till evening, with varying results and resulted in the death of Ghumand Chand at the hands of Bhai Himmat Singh.

== Final days of the siege ==
Guru Gobind Singh was hesitant to accept the Rajas demands, but the Sikhs insisted on it. After meeting Sikh commanders who proposed leaving, Guru Gobind Singh and the Sikhs left Anandpur.

== Aftermath ==
The Guru left for Nirmoh village (Nirmohgarh). The deal turned out to truly be a plan to attack the Sikhs and the Guru while they were weak. The Rajas attacked, and the Sikh fought the Battle of Nirmohgarh (1702).
