= Battle of Anandpur (1700) =

Battle of the Mughal-Sikh Wars

- Part of Mughal-Sikh Wars
| Date | 1700 |
| Location | Anandpur |
| Result | Sikh victory |

Belligerents
| Khalsa (Sikhs) | Mughal Empire: Rajas of the Sivalik Hills |

Commanders and leaders
| Guru Gobind Singh: Panj Pyare; Bhai Daya Singh; Bhai Dharam Singh; Bhai Mohkam Singh; Bhai Himmat Singh; Bhai Sahib Singh | Din Beg (WIA); Painde Khan † |

Strength
| 7,000 | 10,000 Mughals + unknown number of hill raja troops |

Casualties and losses
| Unknown | Unknown, General Painde Khan was killed by Guru Gobind Singh. |

The Battle of Anandpur was fought at Anandpur, between the armies of the Sikh Guru Gobind Singh and the Mughal forces aided by the Nawab of Bahawalpur state, Rajas of the Sivalik Hills.

== Cause ==
The increasing power of Guru Gobind Singh, and his establishment of a military order (Khalsa) alarmed the Rajas of the Sivalik hills. The hill Rajas were concerned about Gobind Singh's rising power and influence in their region and following the defeat of Alim Chand and Balia Chand that unnerved the hill Rajas. After some failed attempts to check the Guru's power, the Rajas teamed with the Mughal Emperor Aurangzeb and his Governor Wazir Khan to help them against the Guru.

The Mughal viceroy of Delhi sent his generals Din Beg and Painda Khan, each with an army of five thousand men, to subdue the Guru under direct orders from Aurangzeb. The Mughal forces were joined by the armies of the hill chiefs at Rupar. The Guru appointed the Panj Piare, his five beloved Sikhs, as the generals of his army.

== Battle ==
According to the Sikh chronicles, Guru Gobind Singh refused to play the role of an aggressor, as he had vowed never to strike except in self-defence.

In the course of a long action near Anandpur, northeast of Ludhiana, Painda Khan was killed—reputedly in single combat by Guru Gobind Singh. After Painde Khan's death, Din Beg assumed the command of his troops. However, he failed to overpower the Guru's forces. The hill Rajas fled from the battlefield, and Din Beg was forced to retreat after being wounded. He was pursued by the Guru's army as far as Rupar.

== Aftermath ==
After the Mughal generals failed to drive off the Guru from Anandpur, the Painda Khan lead Mughal army attacked Anandpur, leading to the Battle of Anandpur (1701).

== In popular culture ==
- The Battle of Anandpur is depicted in the movie Chaar Sahibzaade.
