= Religious initiation rites =

Type of rites

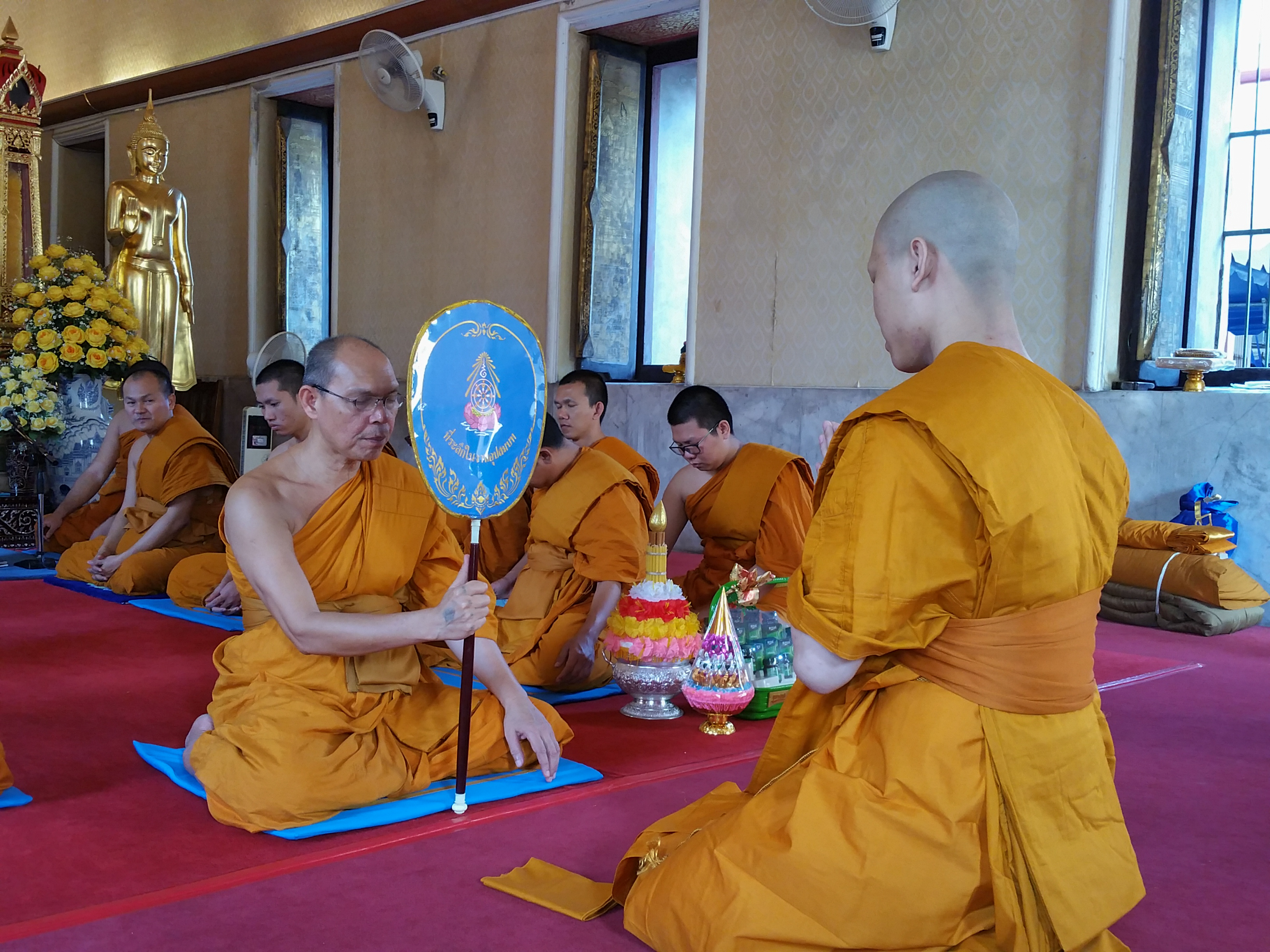
A young Buddhist monk takes his vows at Wat Yannawa in Bangkok (2016)

Many cultures practice or have practiced initiation rites, including the ancient Greeks, the Hebraic/Jewish, the Babylonian, the Mayan, and the Norse cultures. The modern Japanese practice of Miyamairi is such a ceremony. In some, such evidence may be archaeological and descriptive in nature, rather than a modern practice.

== Gnostic Catholicism and Thelema ==
The Ecclesia Gnostica Catholica, or Gnostic Catholic Church (the ecclesiastical arm of Ordo Templi Orientis), offers its Rite of Baptism to any person at least 11 years old. The ceremony is performed before a Gnostic Mass and represents a symbolic birth into the Thelemic community.

== Hinduism ==
Akshara abyasam is a Hindu education initiation ceremony commonly held for children in Karnataka, Andhra Pradesh and Telangana. While the ritual has a religious significance, it does not involve initiation into the faith, but rather the start of schooling.

=== Brahma Kumaris ===
In the Brahma Kumaris, after a probationary period of six months to three years, hundreds of young girls and virgin women are married to God in mass weddings. Their dowries are taken by the organisation after which they belong to it and are often posted at great distance from their families, unlikely to see them again. Returning to the world after doing so is very difficult for them. The practice was defended by the religion as the only way to stop the poor from dumping unwanted daughters on them.

== Islam ==
Belief in the monotheism of God in Islam is sufficient for entering into the fold of faith and does not require a ritual form of baptism. This can be seen in the Quran in the verse: "[And say, “Ours is] the religion of Allah; And who is better than Allah in [ordaining] religion? And we are worshipers of Him.”

== Judaism ==
Conversion to Judaism requires full immersion in a Mikveh, a ritual purification bath connected to a natural spring, well of naturally occurring water or a cistern filled by the rain. According to Orthodox Judaism, immersion of a convert requires three religiously observant male witnesses, preferably rabbis. Potential converts must accept the laws and beliefs in Judaism in front of three witnesses; males must undergo circumcision before the ritual immersion.

== Mandaeism ==
In Mandaeism, priest initiation rites are complex and lengthy. For example, initiating a tarmida (junior priest) takes 68 days.

== Mystery religions ==
In the Greco-Roman world, the mystery religions were those that required initiation, as distinguished from public rites that were open to all; the Greek word for "mystery", mysterion, comes from mystēs, "initiate." (The contemporary English meaning of "something unknown or hard to know" developed from the secrecy surrounding the arcane knowledge promised by these religions.) The most famous of the ancient mysteries, and the most important in Classical Greece, were the Eleusinian Mysteries. The mysteries known as Orphic, Dionysian or Bacchic pertained to the god Dionysus and his "prophet" Orpheus. In the Hellenistic period under Roman rule, the mysteries of Isis, Mithras, and Cybele were disseminated around the Mediterranean and as far north as Roman Britain.

Apuleius, a 2nd-century Roman writer, described an initiation into the mysteries of Isis. The initiation was preceded by a normal bathing in the public baths and a ceremonial sprinkling by the priest, after which the candidate was given secret instructions in the temple of Isis. The candidate then fasted for ten days from meat and wine, after which he was dressed in linen and led at night into the innermost part of the sanctuary, where the actual initiation, the details of which were secret, took place. On the next two days, dressed in the robes of his consecration, he participated in feasting. Apuleius describes also an initiation into the cult of Osiris and yet a third initiation, all of the same pattern.

The water-less initiations of Lucius, the character in Apuleius's story who had been turned into an ass and changed back by Isis into human form, into the successive degrees of the rites of the goddess was accomplished only after a significant period of study to demonstrate his loyalty and trustworthiness, akin to catechumenal practices preceding baptism in Christianity.

In the modern version of the Roman religion, some of the communities use a form of the rite of Aries described in the book Introduction to Magic, by Julius Evola. This rite is also used by the Brotherhood of Myriam albeit with some minor differences. The rite symbolises the rebirth of the soul in spring in accordance with the cosmic and natural rhythms and corresponds to the Christian easter, which is claimed to be a derivate of the rite of Aries.

In the book Pietas: An Introduction to Roman Traditionalism The author makes the claim that the Rite of Aries, corresponds to the ancient Minvervalia where the young Romans would go through their initiation and be introduced to the public cult.

== Sikhism ==
The Sikh initiation ceremony dates from 1699 when the religion's tenth leader (Guru Gobind Singh) initiated five followers and then was himself initiated by his followers. The Sikh baptism ceremony is called Amrit Sanchar or Khande di Pahul. The initiated Sikh is also called an Amritdhari, literally meaning "Amrit Taker" or one who has "Taken on Amrit".

Khande Di Pahul was initiated in the times of Guru Gobind Singh when Khalsa was inaugurated at Sri Anandpur Sahibon the day of Baisakhi in 1699. Guru Gobind Singh asked a gathering of Sikhs who was prepared to die for God. At first, the people hesitated, and then one man stepped forward, and he was taken to a tent. After some time, Guru Gobind Singh came out of the tent, with blood dripping from his sword. He asked the same question again. After the next four volunteers were in the tent, he reappeared with the four, who were now all dressed like him. These five men came to be known as Panj Pyares or the "Beloved Five". These five were initiated into the Khalsa by receiving Amrit. These five were Bhai Daya Singh, Bhai Mukham Singh, Bhai Sahib Singh, Bhai Dharam Singh and Bhai Himmat Singh. Sikh men were then given the name "Singh", meaning "lion", and the women received the last name "Kaur", meaning "princess".

Filling an iron bowl with clean water, he kept stirring it with a two-edged sword (called a Khanda) while reciting over it five of the sacred texts or banis—Japji, Jaap Sahib, Savaiyye, Chaupai and Anand Sahib. The Guru’s wife, Mata Jito (also known as Mata Sahib Kaur), poured sugar crystals into the vessel, mingling sweetness with the alchemy of iron. The five Sikhs sat on the ground around the bowl reverently as the holy water was being churned to the recitation of the sacred verses.

With the recitation of the five banis completed, khande di pahul or amrit, the Nectar of Immortality, was ready for administration. Guru Gobind Singh gave the five Sikhs five palmsful each to drink.

== Wicca ==
In Wicca, an infant is held up to the God and Goddess by the mother and then sprinkled with water or passed over a small fire. This is called Wiccaning.
