= First Battle of Anandpur (1704) =

Battle during the Mughal Sikh Wars

First Battle of Anandpur, 1704
- Part of Mughal-Sikh Wars
Date	1704
Location	Anandpur 31.234961°N 76.498808°E
Result	Sikh victory

Belligerents
Khalsa (Sikhs)	Mughal Empire

Commanders and leaders
Guru Gobind Singh; Bhai Daya Singh; Bhai Dharam Singh; Bhai Mohkam Singh; Bhai Himmat Singh; Bhai Sahib Singh	Ramjan Khan (WIA): Rajas of the Sivalik Hills

Casualties and losses
Unknown	Unknown
- Location within India

The First Battle of Anandpur in 1704 was fought between the Mughal Empire and the Sikhs.

== Battle ==
The Mughals were defeated in the First Battle of Chamkaur earlier in the year, therefore the Mughal Emperor Aurangzeb sent a fresh force under General Ramjan Khan to Anandpur. General Sayyid Khan was replaced by General Ramjan Khan. During the battle, Ramjan Khan was severely wounded after being hit by an arrow shot by Guru Gobind Singh while battling against the Khalsa Army at the well militarized fort of Anandpur Sahib. Hence, because of the failure of all their efforts, the Mughal forces were repulsed by the Sikhs, causing the Mughals to retreat.
