= Battle of Chamkaur =

1704 battle in Punjab, India

- Part of Mughal–Sikh Wars
Date	6 December 1704
Location	Near the village of Chamkaur, Rupnagar district, Punjab, India
Result	Mughal and Hindu Hill Chief victory

Belligerents
Mughal Empire; Alliance of Hill States and Jammu State (c. 850–1812)	Khalsa (Sikhs)

Commanders and leaders
Mughal Commanders: Wazir Khan; Zabardast Khan; Khwaja Muhammad (WIA); Nahar Khan †; Mu'nim Khan; Ghairat Khan †; Hill State Commanders: Ajmer Chand; Fateh Shah	Guru Gobind Singh: Daya Singh; Dharam Singh; Mohkam Singh †; Himmat Singh †; Sahib Singh †; Alam Singh Nachna †; Ajit Singh †; Jujhar Singh †

Strength
Unknown, but much larger (Gobind Singh's Zafarnama metaphorically states that the Mughal soldiers numbered 1 million); Contemporary Mughal sources state 700 cavalry and a park of artillery	40

Casualties and losses
Khwaja Muhammad injured; Nahar Khan killed; Ghairat Khan killed; Innumerable Mughal soldiers Killed.	Ajit Singh killed; Jujhar Singh killed; Mohkam Singh killed; Bhai Himmat Singh killed; Sahib Singh killed; Sangat Singh killed; 31 other Sikh soldiers killed

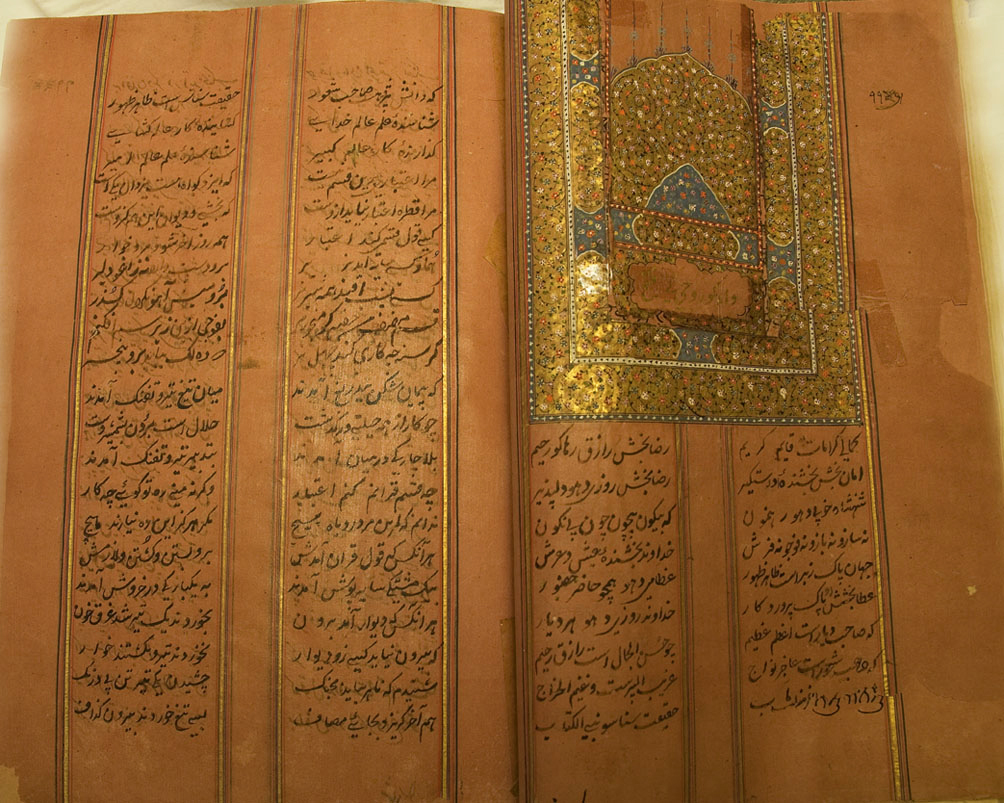
The Zafarnama of Guru Gobind Singh

The Battle of Chamkaur, also known as Battle of Chamkaur Sahib or the Second battle of Chamkaur, was fought between the Khalsa, led by Guru Gobind Singh, and the coalition forces of the Mughals led by Wazir Khan and Hindu hill chiefs. Guru Gobind Singh makes a reference to this battle in his letter Zafarnama.

== Preamble to the battle ==
After Guru Gobind Singh left Anandpur Sahib on the night of 5 and 6 December 1704, or 1705 he crossed the Sarsa River with his disciples. While they were crossing, the Mughals and hill kings attacked. Guru Gobind Singh and his followers asked permission of the city chief for shelter to rest for the night in their garhi or haveli. He refused, but his younger brother allowed the Sikhs to stay in the haveli. According to contemporary Mughal sources, namely a letter sent to Wazir Khan of the Sirhind Sarkar, the Mughals dispatched a force consisting of 700 cavalry and a park of artillery to Chamkaur, where Guru Gobind Singh was taking refuge at the dwelling of a local zamindar of Chamkaur.

== Battle ==
Despite giving assurance of safe conduct, the Mughal soldiers were looking for Guru Gobind Singh, to take his head as a trophy. After learning that the party of Sikhs had taken shelter in the haveli, they laid siege upon it. The actual battle is said to have taken place outside the haveli where Guru Gobind Singh was resting. A council of Panj Piare was convened during the battle, whom ordered Guru Gobind Singh to leave the battlefield to preserve his life and continue leading the Sikhs, a request which the Guru obeyed. Negotiations broke down and the Sikh soldiers chose to engage the overwhelming Mughal forces, thus allowing their Guru to escape. Another Sikh who resembled the Guru, Sangat Singh, donned the Guru's clothes and remained with the soldiers. The next morning the remaining Sikhs were killed by Mughal forces.

== Aftermath ==
The Guru emphasised how he was proud that his sons had died fighting in battle, and that he had 'thousands of sons – the Singhs'. He also said that he would never trust Aurangzeb again due to the broken vow he took on the Quran.

== Zafarnama ==
Zafarnama or "Epistle of Victory" is a letter that was written by Guru Gobind Singh to the then Mughal Emperor Aurangzeb. Zafarnama vividly describes what happened at Chamkaur, and also holds Aurangzeb responsible for what occurred and promises he broke.

After his escape from Chamkaur, the exhausted Guru is said to have been carried by two Pathans (Ghani Khan and Nabi Khan) to Jatpur where he was received by the local Muslim chieftain. He later went to Dina, and stayed at Mai Desanji's house, where he wrote "Zafarnama" in Persian, in 111 verses.

== Dating ==
According to Hari Ram Gupta, the battle of Chamkaur was fought on the Bikrami date of Magh Shudi 7 Samvat 1761, which corresponds to 22 December 1704 in the Gregorian calendar. However, according to Pal Singh Purewal, this date conversion by Hari Ram Gupta was an error and the true date of Poh 8 corresponds to 7 December. According to Purewal, Gupta likely converted the date using a modern panchangs rather than a historical one corresponding to that era, historical shifts in calendar dates were not accounted for.
