= Sangat Singh (Sikh warrior) =

17th century Sikh warrior

Baba Sangat Singh
- Born: 1650; Katta Sabour, Noorpur Bedi, Ropar, Punjab
- Died: 1705 (aged 54–55); Chamkaur, Punjab
- Burial place: Gurudwara Shaheed Burj
- Parents: Bhai Rania (father); Bibi Amaro (mother)
- Relatives: Bhai Bhanu of Saparod Kheri (grandfather)

Bhai Sangat Singh was a Sikh warrior and martyr of Battle of Chamkaur.

== Battle and death ==
Sangat Singh took part in battles of Bhangani, Bajrur, Nadaun, all four battle of Anandpur Sahib, Bansali, Nirmohgarh, Sarsa and Chamkaur.

In second Battle of Chamkaur, Sikh army lost most of their soldiers and Guru Gobind Singh Sahib decided to go to war front. It was opposed by present Sikhs. The Panj Pyare made a decision (Gurmat) and on their insistence, the Guru agreed to leave Chamkaur. His attire, dastar and kalgi was given to Bhai Sangat Singh, who stayed back while defending the fort. He bore a high degree of physical resemblance to Guru Gobind Singh Ji and disguised himself as the Guru in order to trick the enemy.

Sant Singh was also at the fort with Sangat Singh and after Guru's exit, both of them faced the Mughal army and died fighting against them. The Mughal army was mistaken and assumed that Sangat Singh was actually Guru Gobind Singh. It took them some hours to try and identify the body, to realize their mistake.

== See also ==
- Bhai Jiwan Singh
- Battle of Chamkaur
