= Panj Pyare =

Gathered quintet of five baptised Sikhs

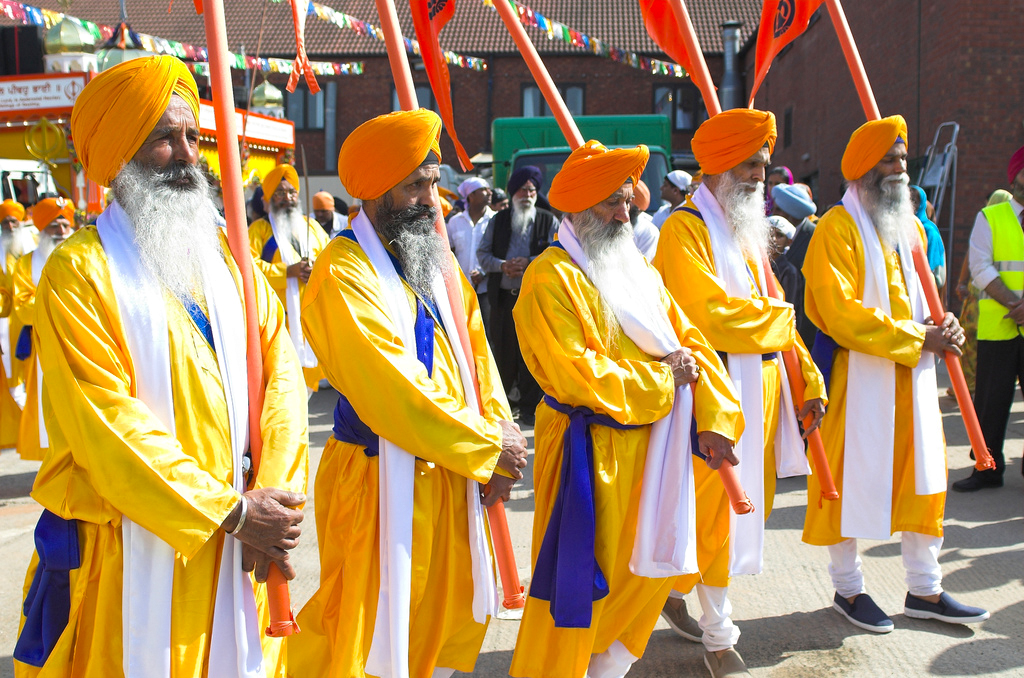
Panj Pyare leading a procession in Wolverhampton, U.K.

Panj Pyare (Punjabi: ਪੰਜ ਪਿਆਰੇ, Pañj Piārē, the five beloved ones) refers to a gathered ad hoc quintet of five baptised (Amritdhari) Khalsa Sikhs who act as institutionalized leaders for the wider Sikh community.

== Function ==
The Panj Pyare are convened for pressing matters in the Sikh community, covering both local and international issues. The constituent members of a Panj Piare quintet are selected based on meritocratic grounds.

=== Ceremonies ===
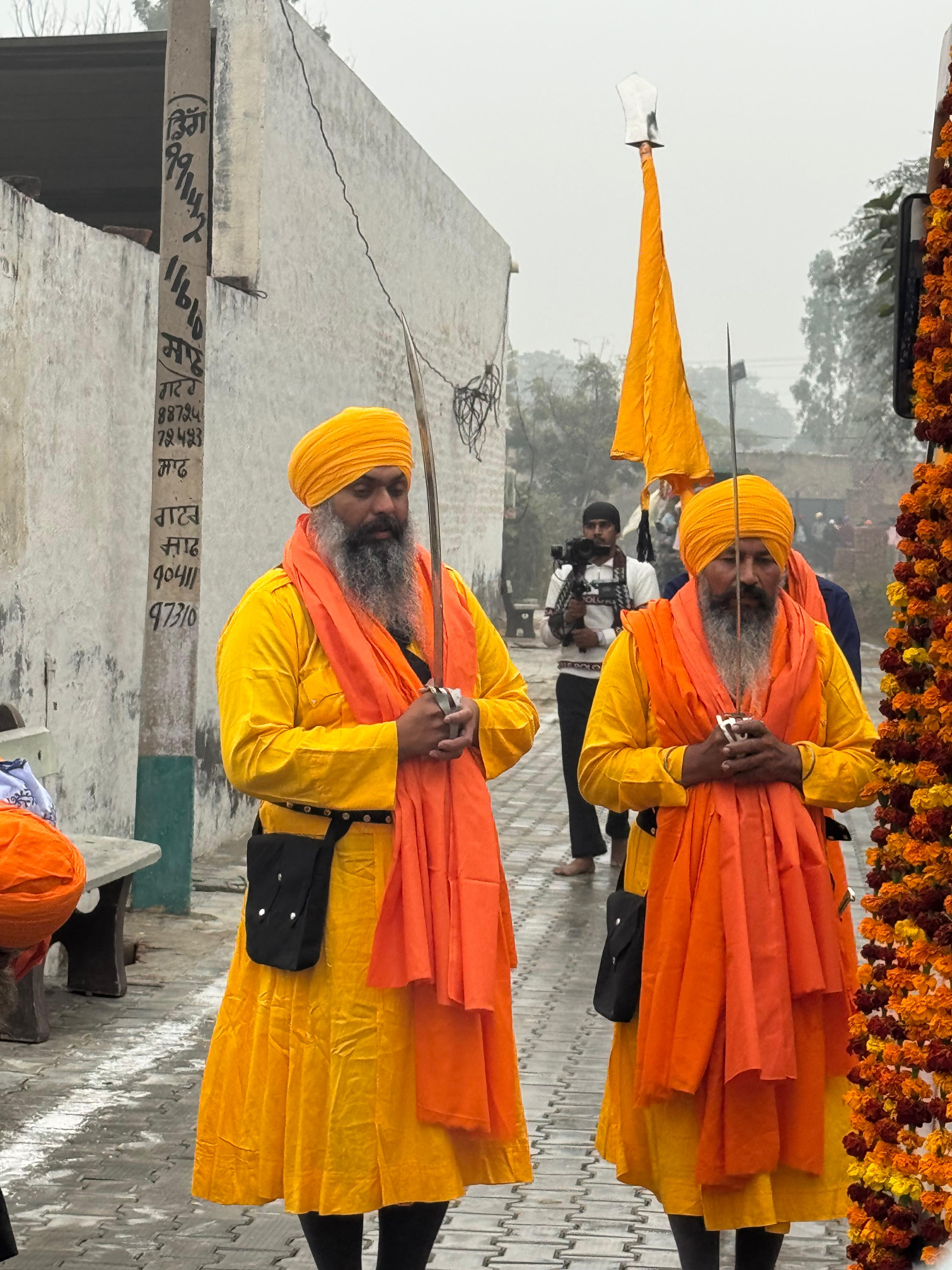
Two of the Panj Pyare at a Nagar Kirtan at Hollanwali village, Ferzoepur district, Punjab, India

They are responsible for leading a Nagar Kirtan procession. The Panj Pyare are also responsible for carrying out the Amrit Sanchar ceremony of baptizing new members into the Khalsa order of Sikhism. Until the Vaisakhi of AD 1699, the Sikh initiation ceremony was known as Charan Pahul. They are responsible for laying the cornerstone of newly built gurdwaras.

== Historical usage ==
In a historical sense, the term is used to refer to a collective name given to five men − Bhai Daya Singh, Bhai Dharam Singh, Bhai Himmat Singh, Bhai Mohkam Singh and Bhai Sahib Singh – by the tenth Sikh guru, Guru Gobind Singh during the historic and monumental assembly at Anandpur Sahib in the Punjab region of India on March 30, 1699. (The Gregorian calendar skipped 11 days in 1752. So, in present times, Vaisakhi occurs near 13 April every year.)

The inaugural group of Panj Piare formed the nucleus of the Khalsa: the first five persons to receive Khanda di Pahul initiation and rites (baptism) of the two-edged sword. They were the inaugural Panj Pyare. However, the term is not limited only to this inaugural group. After them, any group of five baptized Sikhs are also referred to as the Panj Pyare.

During the Second Battle of Chamkaur, it was a council of Panj Piare who commanded Guru Gobind Singh to leave the battlefield to preserve his life and continue leading the Sikhs, an order which the Guru obeyed.

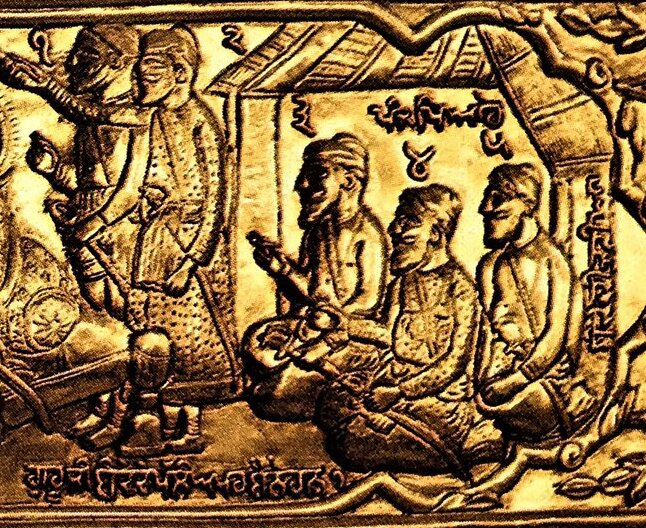
Binod Singh, Kahan Singh, Baj Singh, Daya Singh, and Ram Singh depicted as a Panj Piare group from a gilded panel from Takht Hazur Sahib, Nanded

After the formation of the institution of Panj Piare in 1699, Guru Gobind Singh appointed five Sikhs in Nanded to accompany Madho Das (popularly known as Banda Bairagi) on his northwards mission to conquer Sirhind in 1708. The names of these five Panj Piare were: Binod Singh, Kahan Singh, Baj Singh, Daya Singh, and Ram Singh. Guru Gobind Singh requested Banda to obey the counsel of the Panj Piare but since no accounts of Banda's life mention the institute of the Panj Piare beyond this, it is believed he may not have heeded their commands fully and went astray.

== Background ==
Guru Nanak had organized his followers into sangats, with a meeting between two Sikhs coming to be termed sadh sangat. A gathering of five Sikhs came to be known as panj parmeshar. The idea of five beloved ones predate the formalization of the Khalsa Panth by Guru Gobind Singh in 1699. Guru Nanak alludes to the institution of "five beloved sons" in his gurbani.

"Guru Nanak says, 'In Gurmat (Sikhism) five beloved ones are the sons of the Guru.' Maru M. 1"

— Jaspal Singh, Guru Granth Sahib: The Sikh Scripture (2021), page 62

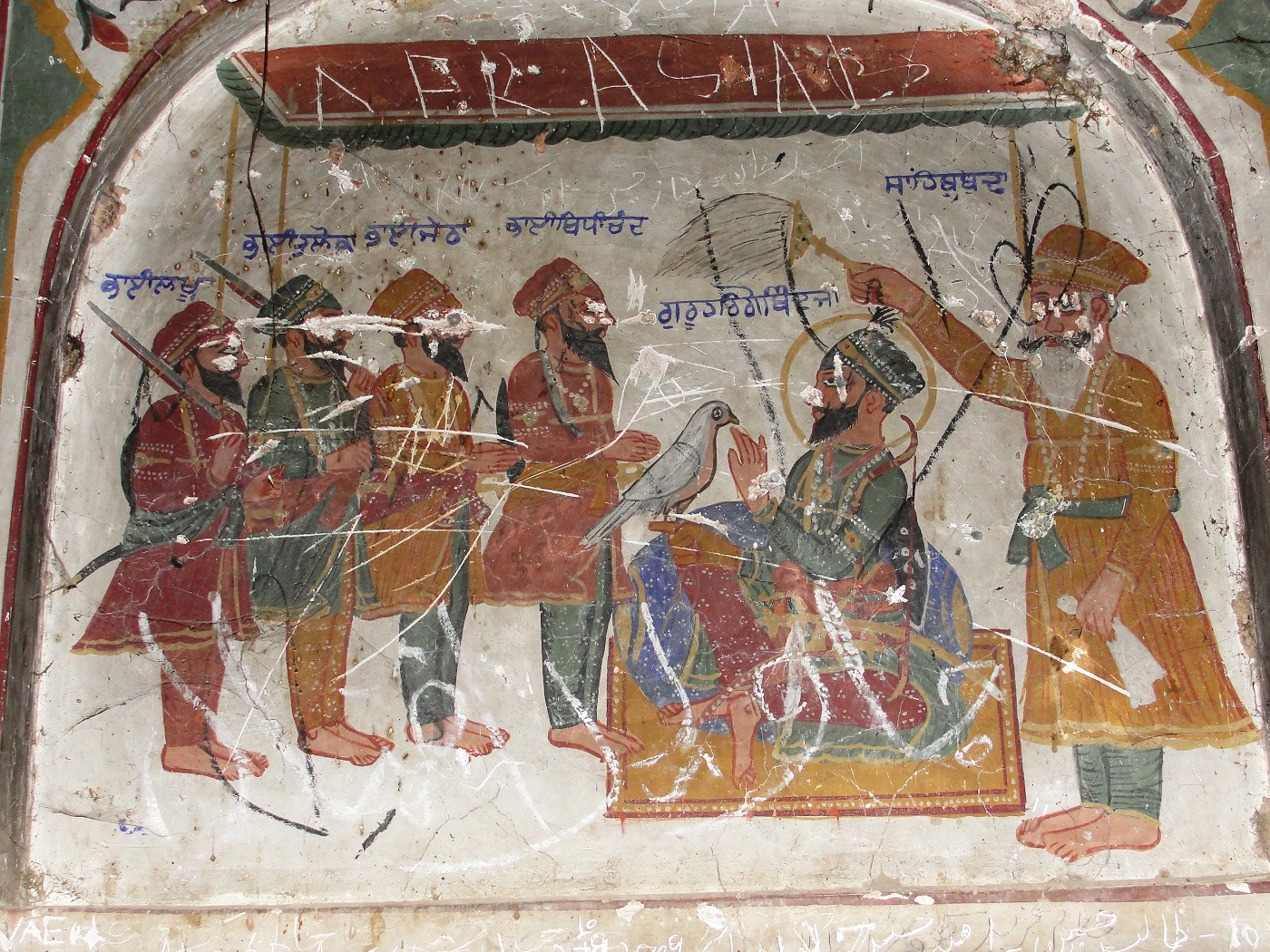
Mural of Guru Hargobind, with Bhai Lakhu, Bhai Tiloka, Bhai Jetha, Bhai Bidhi Chand, and Baba Buddha, from an unidentified Samadhi located near Gurdwara Bhai Than Singh at Kot Fateh Khan, Attock, Punjab

Throughout Sikh history, there have been five beloved ones during different guruship terms. Examples are given below for some of them:

- Guru Nanak: His five beloved ones were Bhai Mardana, Bhai Bala, Bhai Ajita, Bhai Lalo, and Bhai Lehna (later successor).
- Guru Angad: His five beloved ones were Baba Buddha, Paro Julka, Amar Das (later successor), Paida, and Sadharn.
- Guru Amar Das: His five beloved ones were Baba Buddha, Paro, Malhan, Balu, and Jetha (later successor).
- Guru Ram Das: His five beloved ones were Baba Buddha, Bidhi Chand, Teeratha, Dharam, and Guria.
- Guru Arjan: His five beloved ones were Bidhi Chand, Bhai Jetha, Bhai Langah, Bhai Pirana, and Bhai Pera.
- Guru Hargobind: His five beloved ones were Bhai Gurdas, Bidhi Chand, Behlo, Kalayana, and Bhallan.
- Guru Har Rai: His five beloved ones were Bhai Suthra, Feru, Dargah, Bhana, and Bhagta.
- Guru Har Krishan: His five beloved ones were Bhai Dargah, Gurbakhsh, Baba Gurditta, (Note: Not to be confused with Guru Hargobind's son, Baba Gurditta Sodhi.) Sant Ram, and Gurdas.
- Guru Tegh Bahadur: His five beloved ones were Dewan Mati Dasa, Gurdita, (Note: Not to be confused with Guru Hargobind's son, Baba Gurditta Sodhi.) Bhai Dayala, Bhai Ude, and Bhai Jaita (later baptized as Jiwan Singh).
- Guru Gobind Singh: His five beloved ones were the original/inaugural group of Panj Piare as already named in the article.

== Establishment ==
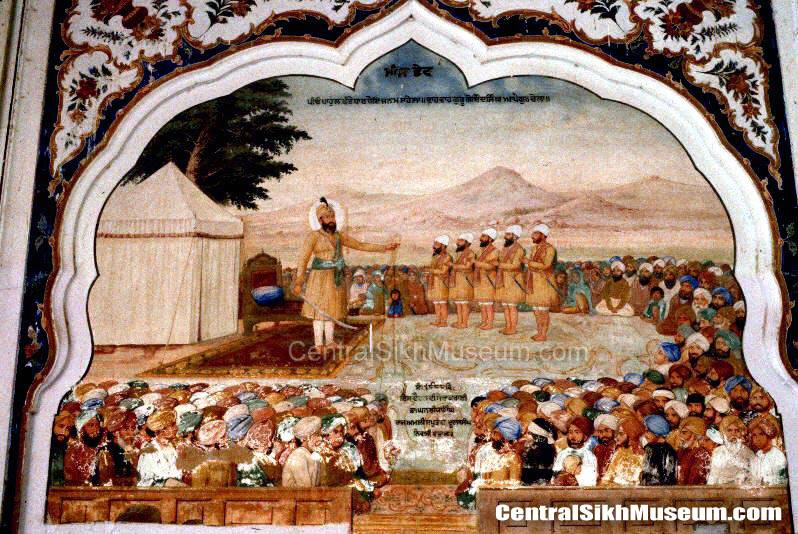
Fresco from Gurdwara Baba Bakala depicting the birth of the Khalsa Panth on the occasion of Vaisakhi in Anandpur, 1699

Guru Gobind Rai was 33 years old when he had divine inspiration to actuate his designs and make an undying legacy. Every year at the time of Baisakhi (springtime), thousands of devotees would come to Anandpur to pay their obeisance and seek the Guru's blessings. In early 1699, months before Baisakhi Day, Guru Gobind Rai sent special edicts to congregants far and wide that year the Baisakhi was going to be a unique affair. He asked them not to cut any of their hair—to come with unshorn hair under their turbans and chunis, and for the men to come with full beards.

On Baisakhi Day, March 30, 1699, hundreds of thousands of people gathered around his divine temporal seat at Anandpur Sahib. The Guru addressed the congregants with a most stirring oration on his divine mission of restoring their faith and preserving the Sikh religion. After his inspirational discourse, he flashed his unsheathed sword and said that every great deed was preceded by equally great sacrifice: He demanded one head for oblation. "I need a head", he declared. After some trepidation one person offered himself. The Guru took him inside a tent. A little later he reappeared with his sword dripping with blood, and asked for another head. One by one, four more earnest devotees offered their heads. Every time the Guru took a person inside the tent, he came out with a bloodied sword in his hand.

Thinking their Guru to have gone berserk, the congregants started to disperse. Then the Guru emerged with all five men dressed in saffron attire (bana) with a blue turban. He baptized the five in a new and unique ceremony called pahul, what Sikhs today know as the baptism ceremony called Amrit. Then the Guru asked those five baptized Sikhs to baptize him as well. This is how he became known as Guru Chela both teacher and student. He then proclaimed that the Panj Pyare—the Five Beloved Ones—would be the embodiment of the Guru himself: "Where there are Panj Pyare, there am I. When the Five meet, they are the holiest of the holy."

He said whenever and wherever five baptized (Amritdhari) Sikhs come together, the Guru would be present. All those who receive Amrit from five baptized Sikhs will be infused with the spirit of courage and strength to sacrifice. Thus with these principles he established Khalsa Panth, the Order of the Pure Ones.

=== Unique identity ===
At the same time the Guru gave his new Khalsa a unique, indisputable, and distinct identity. The Guru gave the gift of bana, the distinctive Sikh clothing and headwear. He also offered five emblems of purity and courage. These symbols, worn by all baptized Sikhs of both sexes, are popularly known today as Five Ks:

- Kesh, unshorn hair this a gift from god;
- Kangha, the wooden comb, which keeps the tangles out of Sikhs' hair, which shows that God keeps the tangles out of one's life;
- Kara, the iron (or steel) bracelet, which has no beginning or end, which shows that God has no beginning or end;
- Kirpan, the sword, used only to defend others weaker than the bearer; and
- Kashera, the underwear worn by Sikhs in battle so they can move freely.

By being identifiable, no Sikh could ever hide behind cowardice again.

Political tyranny and brutality by Islamic Rulers of the day was not the only circumstance that was lowering people's morale. Discriminatory class distinctions (the Indian "caste" system) were responsible for the people's sense of degradation. The Guru wanted to eliminate the anomalies caused by the caste system. The constitution of the Panj Pyare was the living example of his dream: both the high and low castes were amalgamated into one. Among the original Panj Pyare, there was one Khatri, shopkeeper; one jat, farmer one Chhimba, calico printer/tailor; one jheewar, one kumhar, water-carrier; and one Nai, a barber. Further the five were from distant regions - lahore, Uttar Pradesh, Gujarat and Karnataka odisha.. He gave the surname of Singh (Lion) to every Sikh and also took the name for himself. From Gobind Rai he became Guru Gobind Singh. Although he never pronounced that all Sikh women be given the surname Kaur (Princess), it became a custom in the early 20th century and used to this day. Early texts suggest the surname Devi be used, which is consistent with the post-Khalsa hukamnamas of Mata Sahib Devi where she is named as such. With the distinct Khalsa identity and consciousness of purity Guru Gobind Singh gave all Sikhs the opportunity to live lives of courage, sacrifice, and equality.

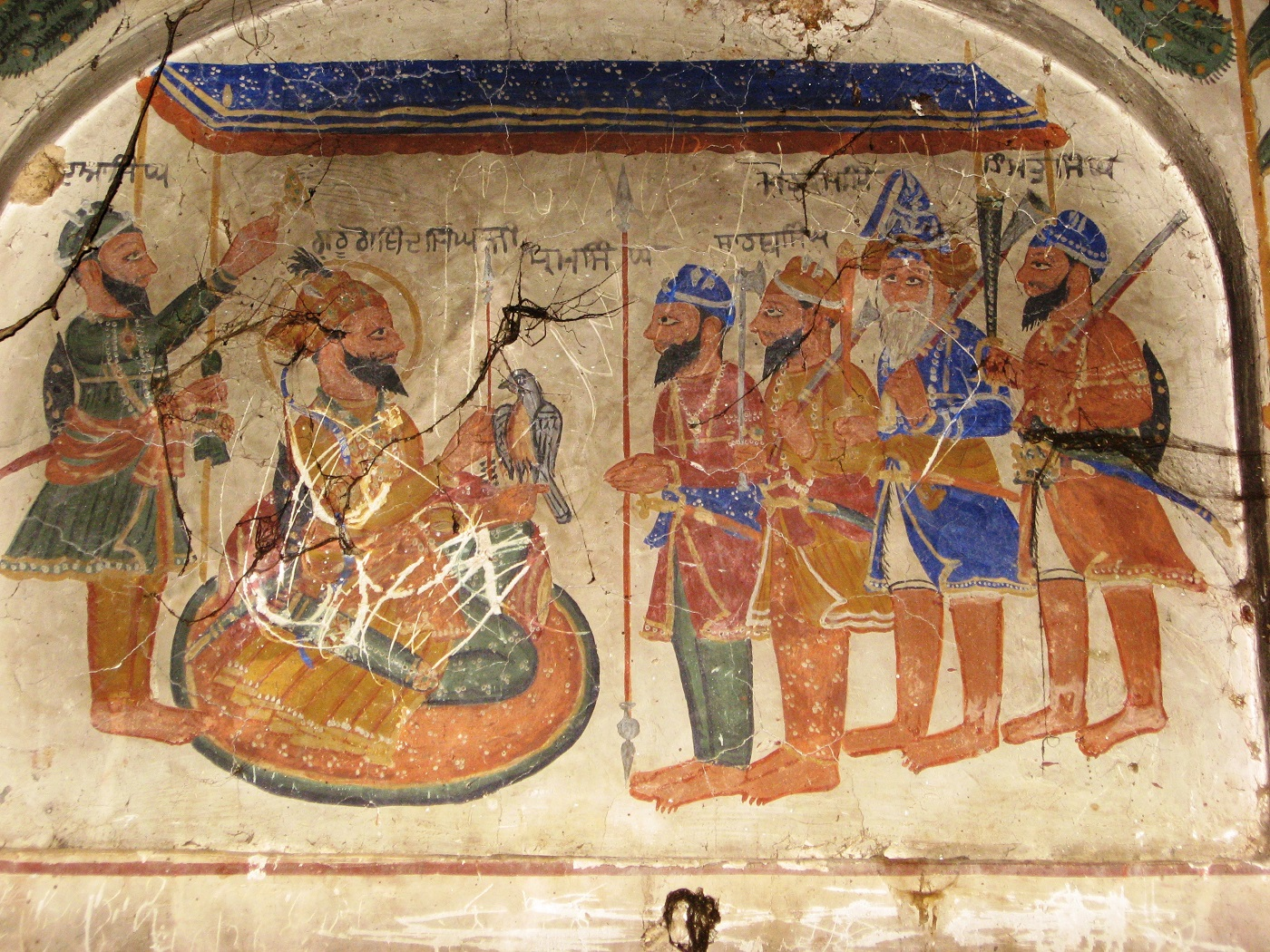
Fresco depiction of Guru Gobind Singh with the inaugural quintet of Panj Pyare from an abandoned Sikh samadhi in Kot Fateh Khan, Attock, Punjab, Pakistan

The birth of the Khalsa is celebrated by Sikhs every Baisakhi Day on April 13. Baisakhi 1999 marks the 300th anniversary of Guru Gobind Singh's gift of Panth Khalsa to all Sikhs everywhere.

Inaugural group of Panj Pyare
| Name | Birth - Death | Religion | Birthplace |
|---|---|---|---|
| Bhai Daya Singh | 1661–1708 | Sikh | Lahore |
| Bhai Dharam Singh | 1666–1708 | Sikh | Hastinapur |
| Bhai Himmat Singh | 1661–1705 | Sikh | Puri |
| Bhai Mohkam Singh | 1663–1705 | Sikh | Bet Dwarka |
| Bhai Sahib Singh | 1662–1705 | Sikh | Bidar |

=== Panj Mukte ===
After the first five initiates into the Khalsa order, the next five (out of a total of ten) were termed the Panj Mukte ('five martyrs') and are named as follows:

1. Ram Singh
2. Fateh Singh
3. Deva Singh (Note: Also spelt as 'Desa Singh'.)
4. Ishar Singh
5. Tahil Singh (Note: Also spelt as 'Tehal Singh'.)

=== After the first ten baptisms ===
According to the Guru Kian Sakhian, after the first ten baptisms (Panj Piare and Panj Mukte), around 20,000 men were ready to accept the baptism whilst a few rejected it. The list of men in-sequence who then underwent the Pahul were: Mani Ram, Diwan Bachittar Das, Ude Rai, Anik Das, Ajaib Das, Ajaib Chand, Chaupat Rai, Diwan Dharam Chand, Alam Chand Nachna, and Sahib Ram Koer. This group was then followed by Rai Chand Multani, Gurbakhsh Rai, Pandit Kirpa Ram Dutt of Mattan, Subeg Chand, Gurmukh Das, Sanmukh Das, Amrik Chand, Purohit Daya Ram, Ratna, Gani Das, Lal Chand Peshauria, Rup Chand, Sodhi Dip Chand, Nand Chand, Nanu Rai of Diwali, and Hazari, Bhandari and Darbari of Sirhind. As many as 80,000 men are said to have been baptized in the first few days after Vaisakhi 1699.

== Gender ==
Since the inaugural quintet that began the institution of Panj Pyare, and who had been appointed by Guru Gobind Singh himself, had been all-male, many Sikhs believe the Panj Pyare can only consist of men and that women cannot be initiated as representatives. However, this is challenged as being against the Sikh belief and practice of gender equality. The 3HO sect of Sikhs allow baptized Sikh women to form the Panj Pyare.

== Gallery ==
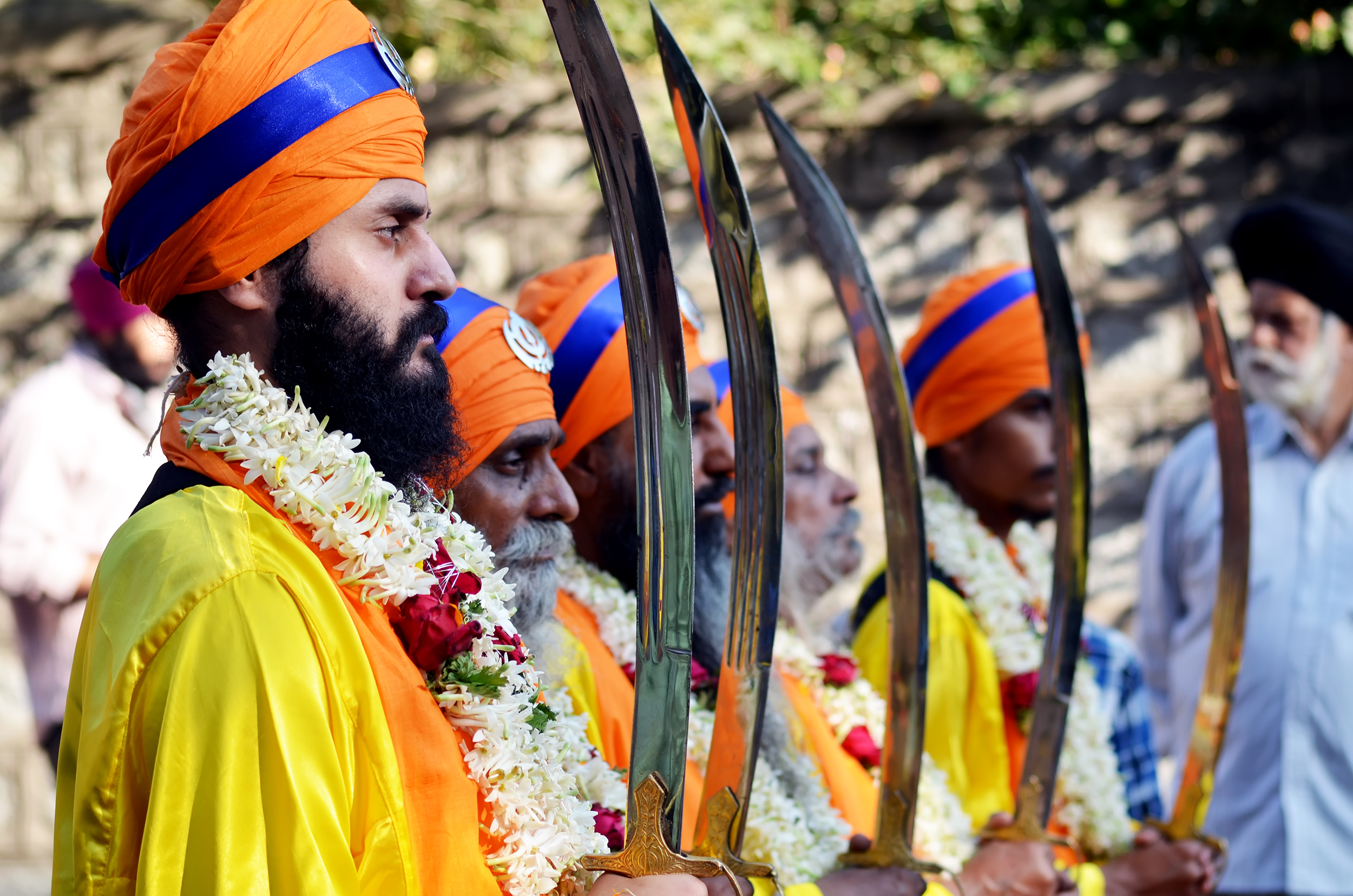
Panj Pyare at a Nagar Kirtan in Bangalore, India

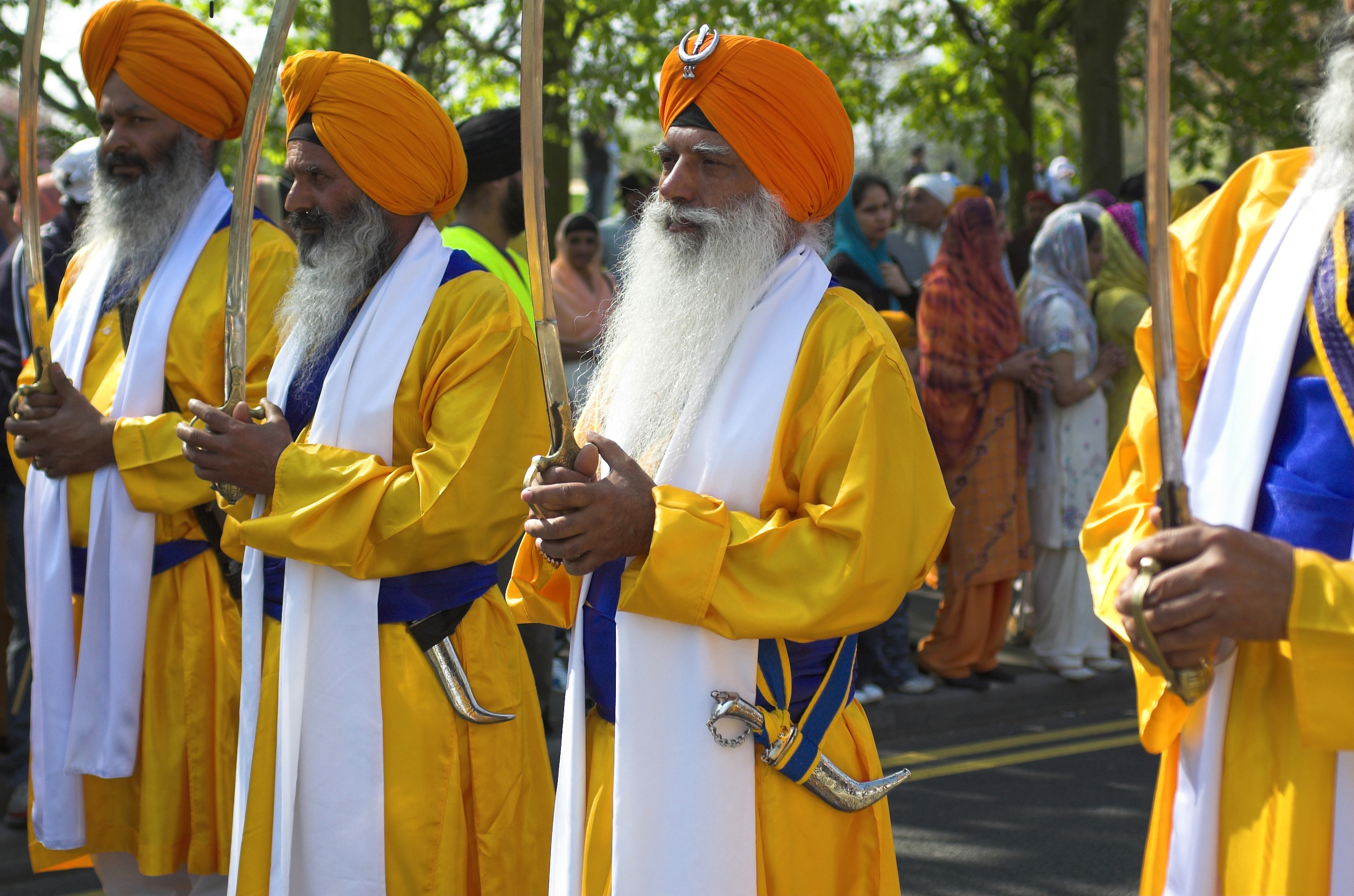
Panj Pyare in Birmingham, England

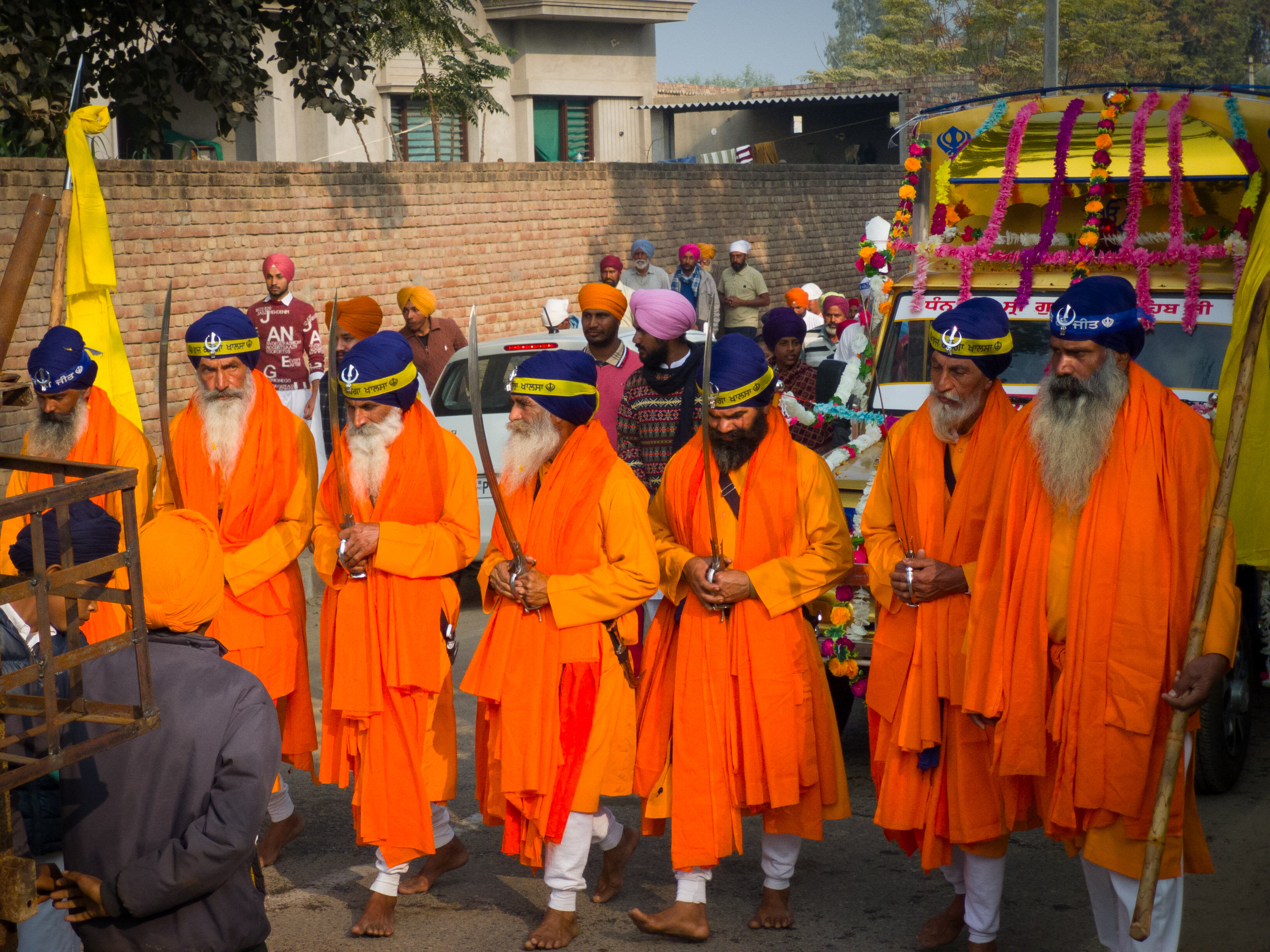
Panj Pyare in Nagar Kirtan, Burj Bhalaike, Punjab, India

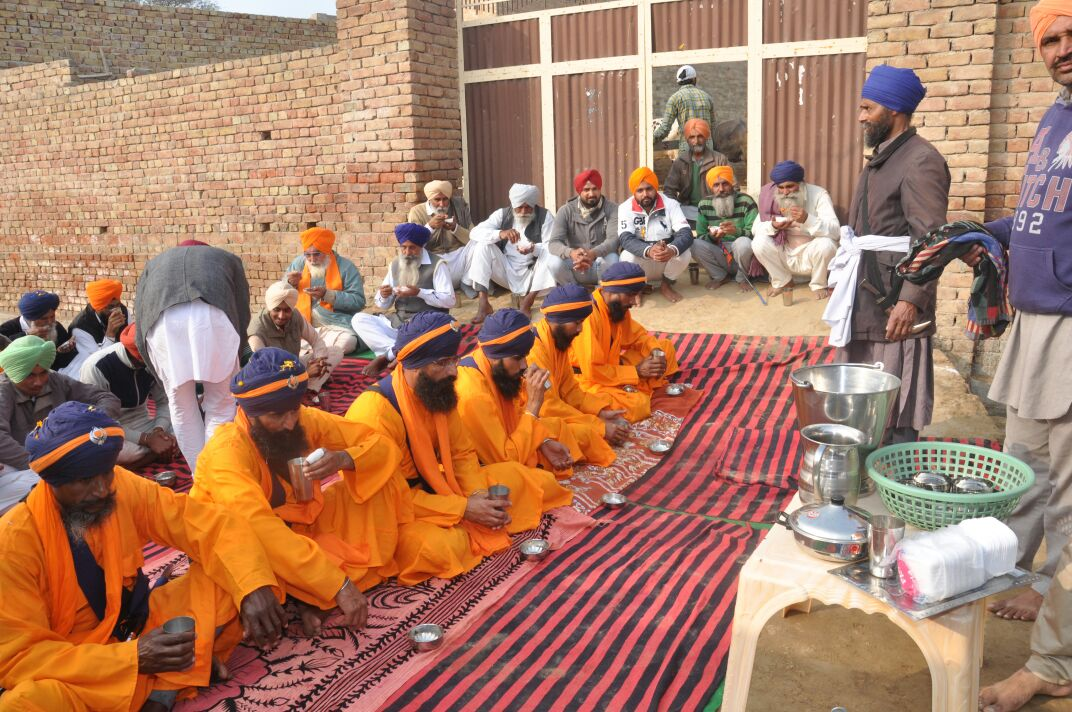
Panj Pyare in Bhangala

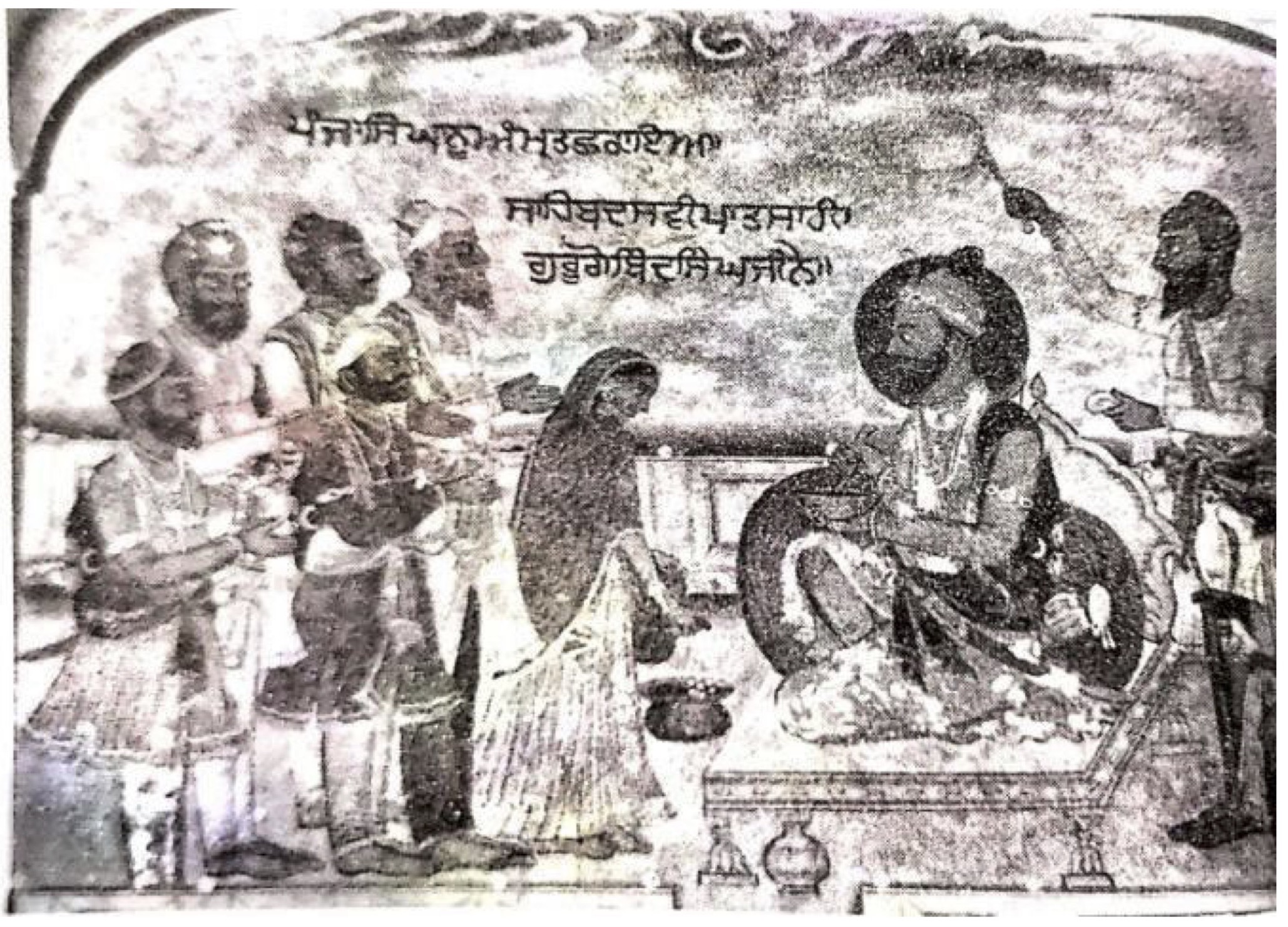
Fresco of Guru Gobind Singh, Mata Jito and Panj Pyare

== See also ==
- Panj peer

== Bibliography ==
- "Concepts in Sikhism". Global Sikh Studies [www.globalsikhstudies.net]. Archived from the original on February 23, 2009.
1. Gurdas, Bhai, Varan
2. Jaggi, Rattan Singh, ed., Bansavalinama. Chandigarh, 1972
3. Kuir Singh, Gurbilas Patshahi 10. Patiala, 1968
4. Bhangu, Ratan Singh, Prachin Panth Prakash. Amritsar, 1962
5. Santokh Singh, Bhai, Sri Gur Pratap Suraj Granth, Amritsar, 1927–35
6. Bhalla, Sarup Das, Mahima Prakash.
7. Gian Singh, Giani, Panth Prakash, Patiala, 1970
8. Sukha Singh, Gurbilas Dasvin Patshahi, Patiala, 1970
