= Daya Singh =

Indian Sikh Khalsa order member (1661–1708)

Bhai / Pyare Daya Singh Sobti Ji
- ਦਇਆ ਸਿੰਘ
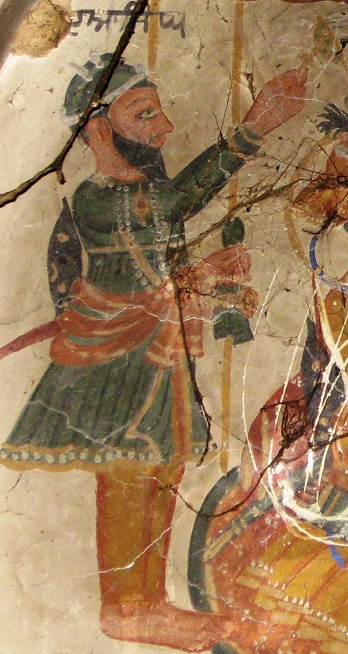
- Daya Singh Sobti, one of the inaugural/original Panj Pyare, depicted in an old Sikh fresco from inside an abandoned Sikh samadhi located in Kot Fateh Khan, Attock, Punjab, Pakistan

Panj Pyare
- In office 1699–1708

Bhai Daya Singh Samparda
- Succeeded by: Baba Sobha Singh (Anandpur Sahib)

Personal life
- Born: Daya Ram Sobti; 1661 Lahore, Punjab (modern-day Pakistan)
- Died: 1708 (aged 47) Nanded, India
- Parents: Bhai Suddha ji (father); Mai Dayali ji (mother)
- Known for: Mukhi of the original, inaugural Panj Pyare; The first to answer the call by the Guru for a sacrifice; Founder of Bhai Daya Singh Samparda
- Occupation: Shopkeeper, later a General and a Teacher

Religious life
- Religion: Sikhism
- Institute: Khalsa

Daya Singh (Punjabi: ਦਇਆ ਸਿੰਘ (Gurmukhi); born Daya Ram; 1661–1708) was one of the Panj Pyare, the first five Sikhs to be initiated into the Khalsa order in 17th-century India. Among the inaugural panj piare quintet, he is traditionally the highest-regarded as he was the first to answer the call for a sacrifice from the guru. Daya Singh was an educated Sikh, with literature being attributed to his authorship.

== Biography ==
=== Early life ===
He was born as Daya Ram in a Sobti Khatri family in 1661 to Bhai Suddha and Mai Diali. His birthplace in Lahore was located in Koocha Softi, now known as Katri Bawa, it was marked by the Janamasthan Bhai Daya Singh shrine (which descendants of Bhai Mardana now reside it). His father, Suddha, was from Lahore and was a devout Sikh of Guru Tegh Bahadur. Suddha had visited the ninth guru's court in Anandpur on multiple occasions. In 1677, the family of Suddha, including his son Daya Ram and wife Diali, shifted permanently to Anandpur and sought the blessings of Guru Gobind Singh. While living in Anandpur, Daya Ram who had a background of education in Persian and Punjabi, pursued the study of martial arts, the classics, and gurbani.

=== Later life ===
==== Baptism ====
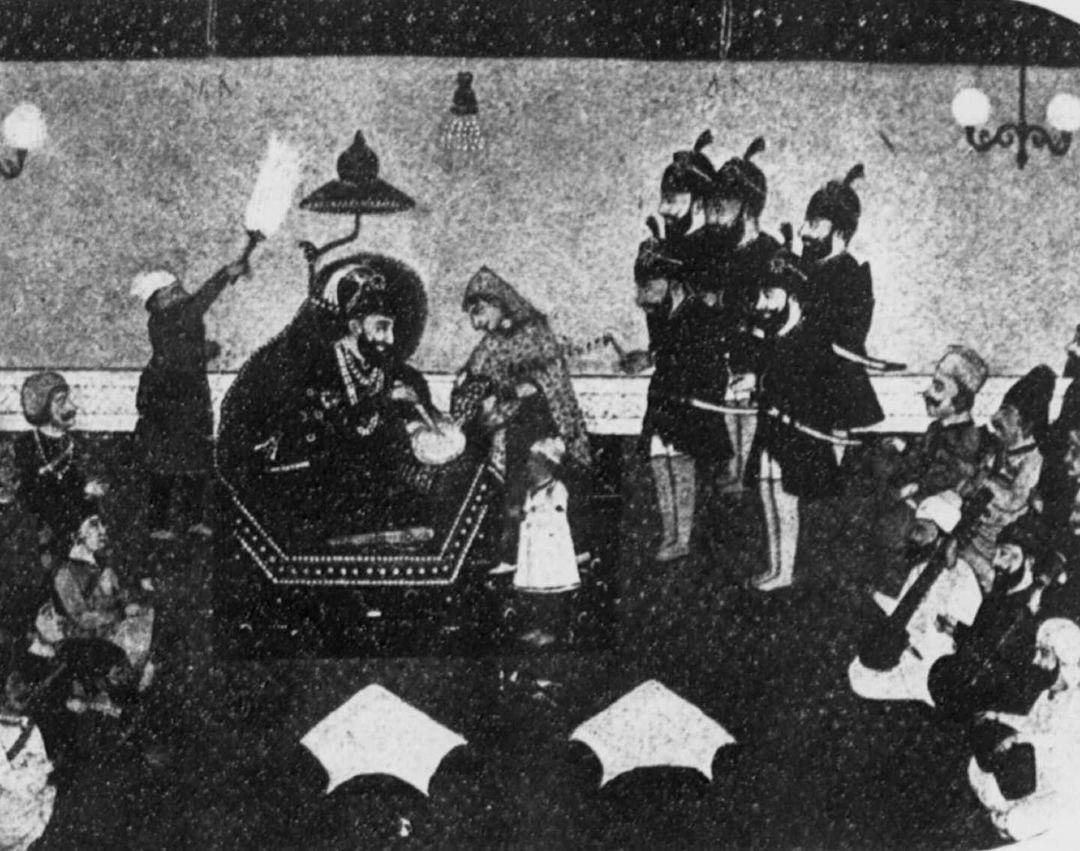
Painting of the establishment of the Khalsa order and Panj Piare institution by Guru Gobind Singh and Mata Jito at Anandpur in 1699, circa 19th century. Daya Singh can be seen standing with the four other members of the inaugural Panj Piare quintet.

At the famous diwan gathering at Kesgarh Qila (fortress) in Anandpur on 30 March 1699, Daya Singh was the first of the amassed Sikhs to answer the Sikh guru's call for a head. After him, four other Sikhs answered the call and these five became the inaugural quintet of the panj piare institution of the Khalsa, with the five being seen as equal to the Sikh guru. After this, they initiated Guru Gobind Singh into the Khalsa fold. Daya Ram thus became Daya Singh after his admission into the Khalsa.

==== Escape from Chamkaur ====
Daya Singh became a highly-regarded attendant of the Sikh guru and took part in important battles at Anandpur and Chamkaur. Daya Singh was part of a group of three Sikhs who followed after Guru Gobind Singh after leaving from the besieged Chamkaur on the night of 7–8 December 1705. Daya Singh reunited with and accompanied the Guru in the Malwa region in the aftermath of the Second Battle of Chamkaur.

==== Delivery of the Zafarnama letter ====
Daya Singh, alongside Bhai Dharam Singh, were the two Sikhs entrusted with delivering the Guru's Zafarnama letter to Mughal emperor Aurangzeb. They were dispatched from either Kangar village, Bathinda or Dina village, Moga, for this purpose. The letter was to be delivered to Aurangzeb whilst he was encamped at Ahmadnagar in the Deccan. However, when the pair reached Ahmadnagar via Aurangabad, they discovered that they would not be able to personally deliver the letter to the Mughal emperor as had been instructed. Thus, Daya Singh requested Dharam Singh to return to Guru Gobind Singh and seek his advice. Before Dharam Singh could return with the guru's guidance, Daya Singh had already successfully delivered the letter to Aurangzeb and he had returned to Aurangabad, staying in Dhami Mahalla. Daya Singh prepared a copy of the original Zafarnama letter, which is still extant.

==== Death ====
After this, Daya Singh and Dharam Singh reunited with Guru Gobind Singh at Kalayat (located 52 km southwest of Bikaner in Rajasthan). Daya Singh was with the Sikh guru when he died in Nanded in the Deccan on 7 October 1708. Shortly after, Daya Singh himself died at Nanded and a memorial called Angitha Bhai Daya Singh ate Dharam Singh jointly commemorates his and Dharam Singh's crematory grounds.

== Legacy ==
Early Sikh literature claims Daya Singh was the reincarnation of Lava. Gurdwara Bhai Daya Singh in Dhami Mahalla in the interior of Aurangabad marks a temporary stay of his in the house of a local Sikh. A Rehitnama (manual on Sikh conduct) is attributed to him. The Darauli branch of the Nirmala sect claims to trace their lineage to Daya Singh via Baba Deep Singh.

Under the Hukam of Guru Gobind Singh Ji, Bhai Daya Singh established a Taksal (school) to impart the spiritual wisdom he received from the Guru to the Sikh community. This institution became known as the Bhai Daya Singh Samparda, with its responsibilities later entrusted to Bhai Sobha Singh of Anandpur Sahib, a devoted Sikh and disciple of Bhai Daya Singh.

In August 2024, it was reported that the birthplace location of Daya Singh was rediscovered inside the old walled-city of Lahore, specifically in Koocha Softi Khatrian (now called Koocha Katri Bawa).

== Gallery ==
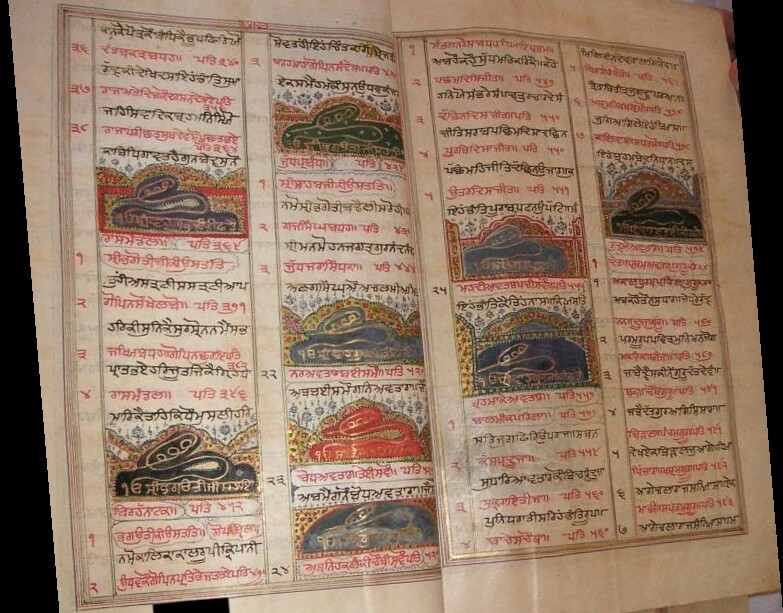
Dasam Granth manuscript from Aurangabad attributed to Bhai Daya Singh

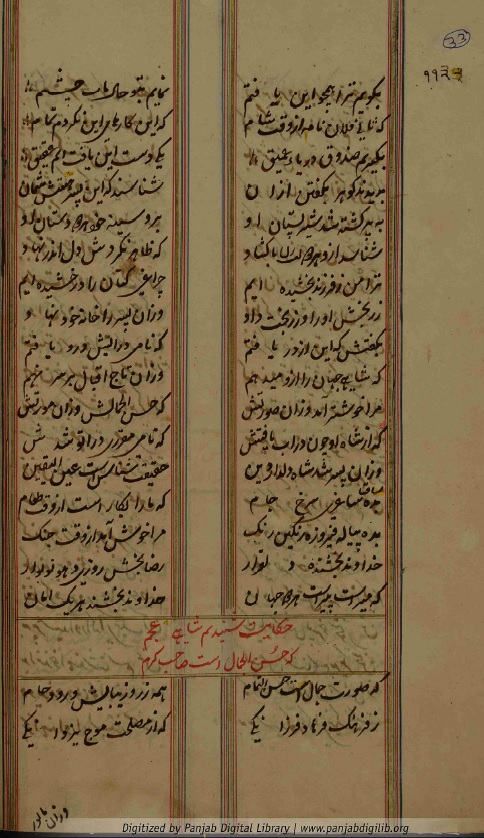
Ending and beginning of the 8th "Hikayat" of the Dasam Granth, written by Bhai Daya Singh, present within the "Aurangabadi Bir"
