= Mohkam Singh =

Sikh martyr

Bhai / Pyare Mohkam Singh Ji
- ਮੋਹਕਮ ਸਿੰਘ
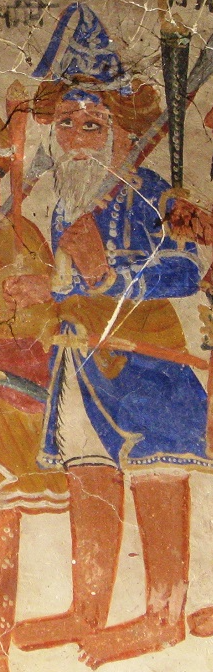
- Mohkam Singh, one of the inaugural/original Panj Pyare, depicted in an old Sikh fresco from inside an abandoned Sikh samadhi located in Kot Fateh Khan, Attock, Punjab, Pakistan

Panj Pyare
- In office 1699–1708

Personal life
- Born: Mohkam Chand Chhimba; 1663 Dwarka (present-day Gujarat, India)
- Died: 7 December 1704 or 1705 (aged 43 or 44) Chamkaur, Punjab, India
- Cause of death: Killed in action
- Parents: Tirath Chand (father); Devi Bai (mother)
- Known for: Member of the original, inaugural Panj Pyare; was the second or fourth to answer the call by the Guru for a head
- Occupation: Tailor, printer of cloth

Religious life
- Religion: Sikhism
- Institute: Khalsa

Mohkam Singh (Punjabi: ਮੋਹਕਮ ਸਿੰਘ (Gurmukhi); 6 June 1663 – 7 December 1704 or 1705), born Mohkam Chand (his given name is also transliterated as Muhkam or Mohkhum), was one of the inaugural group of Panj Pyare, or the first Five Beloved of honoured memory in the Sikh tradition.

== Biography ==
Mohkam was born into the Chhimba caste and was the son of Tirath Chandi and Devi Bai, from Bet Dwarka (modern-day Gujarat, India).

In about the year 1685, he came to Anandpur, then the seat of Guru Gobind Singh. He practised martial arts and took part in Sikhs battles with the surrounding hill chiefs and imperial troops. He was one of the five who offered their heads in response to Guru Gobind Singh's call on the Baisakhi day of 1699 and earned the appellation of Panj Pyare. Initiated into the order of the Khalsa, Mohkam Chand received the common surname of Singh and became Mohkam Singh. Bhai Mohkam Singh died in the battle of Chamkaur on 7 December 1704 or 1705 with Bhai Himmat Singh and Bhai Sahib Singh.

In older sources, he was the second position of the original Panj Pyare. However, later sources moved him down to fourth in-position and replaced the second position with Dharam Singh.

Early Sikh literature claims Mohkam was the reincarnation of Bhagat Namdev.
