= Khalsa =

Sikh community and special group

Khālsā
- ਖਾਲਸਾ
- Khanda
- Active: 13 April 1699 – present
- Allegiance: Waheguru
- Branch: Khalsa Fauj (1699–1730s); Dal Khalsa (1730s–1799); Sikh Khalsa Army (1799–1849); Akali-Nihang (1700s–present)
- Type: Sikh religious order
- Headquarters: Panj Takht, Akal Takht Sahib, Anandpur Sahib
- Motto: Deg Tegh Fateh
- Colors: Navy blue and xanthic
- Anniversaries: Vaisakhi, Holla Mohalla, Bandi Chhor Divas

Commanders
- Founders: Guru Gobind Singh; Mata Sahib Kaur
- Panj Pyare: Bhai Daya Singh; Bhai Dharam Singh; Bhai Himmat Singh; Bhai Mohkam Singh; Bhai Sahib Singh
- Jathedar of the Akal Takht: disputed: Jagtar Singh Hawara (Sarbat Khalsa; imprisoned) since 10 November 2015; Dhian Singh Mand (Sarbat Khalsa; acting) since 10 November 2015; Kuldip Singh Gargaj (SGPC) since 7 March 2025

Insignia
- Insignia: Khanda
- Individual/Personal Identification: The Five Ks
- Corporate/Panthic Identification: Nishan Sahib
- Predecessor (military): Akal Sena

The term Khālsā (Punjabi: ਖਾਲਸਾ, pronounced [kʰaːl(ə̆)saː]) refers to both a community that follows Sikhism as its religion, as well as a special group of initiated Sikhs. The Khalsa tradition was initiated in 1699 by the Tenth Guru of Sikhism, Guru Gobind Singh. Its formation was a key event in the history of Sikhism. The founding of Khalsa is celebrated by Sikhs during the festival of Vaisakhi.

Guru Gobind Singh started the Khalsa tradition after his father, Guru Tegh Bahadur, was beheaded during the rule of the Mughal emperor Aurangzeb after the Hindu Brahmins had sought his aid to save their religion. Guru Gobind Singh created and initiated the Khalsa as a warrior with a duty to protect the innocent from religious persecution. The founding of the Khalsa started a new phase in the Sikh tradition. It formulated an initiation ceremony (amrit sanskar, nectar ceremony) and rules of conduct for the Khalsa warriors. It created a new institution for the temporal leadership of the Sikhs, replacing the earlier Masand system. Additionally, the Khalsa provided a political and religious vision for the Sikh community.

Upon initiation, a male Sikh was given the title of Singh meaning "lion". Kaur was made the sole, compulsory identifier for female Sikhs in the twentieth century. The rules of life include a behavioural code called Rahit. Some rules are no tobacco, no intoxicants, no adultery, no Kutha meat, no modification of hair on the body, and a dress code (Five Ks).

While originally a distinct subset of Sikhs, today the dilineation between Khalsa Sikhs and the wider, mainstream Sikh community has become blurred and muddled, despite most Sikhs not being formally ordained into the Khalsa order as Amritdharis. Most Sikhs hold the Khalsa institution in high-regard as the ultimate stage of a Sikh that serious Sikhs should aspire to become.

== Etymology ==
The term khālsā, is derived from the Arabic word خالص k͟hālis which means "to be pure, to be clear, to be free from, to be sincere, to be true, to be straight, to be solid".

Sikhism emerged in the northwestern part of the Indian subcontinent (now parts of Pakistan and India). During the Mughal empire rule, according to professor Eleanor Nesbitt, Khalsa originally meant the land that was possessed directly by the emperor, which was different from jagir land granted to lords in exchange for a promise of loyalty and annual tribute to the emperor.

Prior to Guru Gobind Singh, the religious organization was organized through the masands or agents. The masands would collect revenue from rural regions for the Sikh cause, much like jagirs would for the Islamic emperor. The Khalsa, in Sikhism, came to mean pure loyalty to the Guru, and not to the intermediary masands who were increasingly becoming corrupt, states Nesbitt.

== Background ==
The word "Khalsa" as used by Sikhs first finds mentions in the hukamnamas issued during the guruship tenure of Guru Hargobind, where he references the congregation of the east as being the "Khalsa of the guru". A later hukamnama issued by Guru Tegh Bahadur refers to the local Sikh congregation of Pattan Farid as being 'Guru ji ka Khalsa' ("Khalsa of the guru"). In a hukamnama of Guru Gobind Singh dated to 25 April 1699, he refers to a congregation of local Sikhs of Bhai Gurdas Bhagte Phaphre village as 'sangat sahlang', with the 'sahlang' term being a different designation from that of a Khalsa. According to the Dabestan-e Mazaheb, the 'sahlang' term referred to person(s) initiated into the Sikh religion by a masand, who acted as representatives on behalf of the Sikh gurus. Such Sikhs were termed as meli or masandia, and were differentiated from Sikhs who had received their initiation rites directly from a Sikh guru, whom were termed as Khalsa. Whilst extant hukamnamas of Guru Gobind Singh from the period of 1699 to 1707 refer to local Sikh congregations or individual Sikhs as being the guru's Khalsa (often with the phrase 'Sarbat sangat mera Khalsa hai' meaning "the entire congregation is my Khalsa"), with the coming of the end of a personal guruship, Guru Gobind Singh would then issue a hukamnama to the Sikh congregation of Varanasi on 3 February 1708 that referred to them as being 'Waheguru ji ka Khalsa' ("Khalsa of Waheguru").

The term Khalsa in Sikhism predates the events of Vaisakhi in 1699. Before the formalization of the Khalsa Panth in April 1699, the term Khalsa referred to a very special Sikh who was held in high esteem and considered as being close to the Guru. The Khalsa Panth's formalization in 1699 essentially opened this restricted class of Sikhs as a possibility to attain for the wider congregation. During the period of Banda Singh Bahadur, two extant hukamnamas of Banda that were issued to the Sikh congregations of Bhai Rupa and Jaunpur refer to them as being 'Akal Purakh jio da Khalsa' (meaning "the Khalsa of the Immortal Being"). With the later hukamnamas of Guru Gobind Singh's widowed wives, Mata Sundari and Mata Sahib Devan, of which there are around a dozen issued variously between the years 1717–1732, the Khalsa is also described as belonging to the supreme god, termed as Akal Purakh. By the time the Akal Takht began to issue hukamnamas, referring to itself as 'Sat Sri Akal Purakh ji ka Khalsa', the phrase 'Waheguru ji ka Khalsa' had already been established in common Sikh parlence to refer to specific people or a collective.

The Sikhs faced religious persecution during the Mughal Empire rule. Guru Arjan Dev, the fifth Guru, was arrested and executed by Mughal Emperor Jahangir in 1606. The following Guru, Guru Hargobind formally militarised the Sikhs and emphasised the complementary nature of the temporal power and spiritual power. In 1675, Guru Tegh Bahadur, the ninth Guru of the Sikhs and the father of Guru Gobind Singh was executed by the Mughal emperor Aurangzeb for resisting religious persecution of non-Muslims, and for refusing to convert to Islam. Guru Gobind Singh's sons were killed since they refused to convert to Islam. The Dadupanthis had a tradition that was known as Khalsa, being inspired by the Sikh tradition.

According to Louis E. Fenech, militant/armed ascetics and mahants were prevalent in 17th and 18th century India. Some prominent sects that were militant/armed were the Udasis, Dasnamis, Dadupanthis, Sanyasis, Fakirs, Ramanandis, and Naga-Gosains, whom according to 18th century Sikh accounts were amicable to the tenth Sikh guru. Guru Gobind Singh hired some of these militant ascetics for defensive purposes but doubted their loyalty. One account recalls that the Udasi ascetic Kirpal Das participated in the Battle of Bhangani in 1688 with the Sikhs against the Pahari rajas. Thus, the Khalsa tradition was inaugurated to produce an amalgamation of the nirgun bhakti of the Ramanandis and the militant asceticism of the Ramanandis and Naga-Gosains. Therefore the institution is a mixture of miri-piri, shakti, and bhakti, allowing Sikhs to be transformed into loyal sant-sipahis.

Evidence found within Bhai Jaita's Sri Gur Katha suggest that the title Singh was used by the Sikhs in the period leading up to the Battle of Bhangani, with the guru officiating the title for the Sikhs with the formalization of the Khalsa, popularly accepted as occurring in the year 1699. However, 1699 as the year when the Khalsa was formed only became popularly accepted due to a late 19th century work by Giani Gian Singh. The early 18th century Sikh sources place the year that the Khalsa was founded between 1695 and 1698, with Koer Singh Kalal stating it occurring in 1689. Furthermore, an inscribed copper-plate (tamar patar) dated to 1679 issued by Guru Gobind Singh to Jawala Das Brahman of a Shaivist temple in Kapal Mochan discusses the Khalsa and suffixes the guru's name with Singh. Thus, Raj Kumar Hans divides the creation of the Khalsa into two phases based upon Bhai Jaita's work:

1. Pre-Bhangani phase, where a large congregation of the Sikhs (invited from local and distant areas) was held at the Damdama at Anandpur, with a select few Sikhs starting to use Singh as a title and the Panj Piare consisted of a group of five Sikhs who answered the guru's call (with both aspects to martialize the Sikhs to prepare them for the upcoming battles), the guru also adopted the title of Singh. He dates this phase to between 1676–78.
2. Post-Bhangani phase, after a series of successful battles where the Singhs and Panj Piare prove itself worthy, these aspects were popularized and standardized with the introduction of the Amrit Sanchar initiation ceremony, finalizing the Khalsa, which he places in around 1689.

Hans states that Guru Gobind Singh was motivated to found the Khalsa due to no Sikh taking action and remaining idle during the execution of his father in Delhi, with the Sikhs not standing out from the rest of the general population and not identifiable as separate. Thus, the guru contemplated a way to transform the Sikhs into intellectual-warriors, donning the 5Ks to give them a distinct appearance.

== Foundation ==
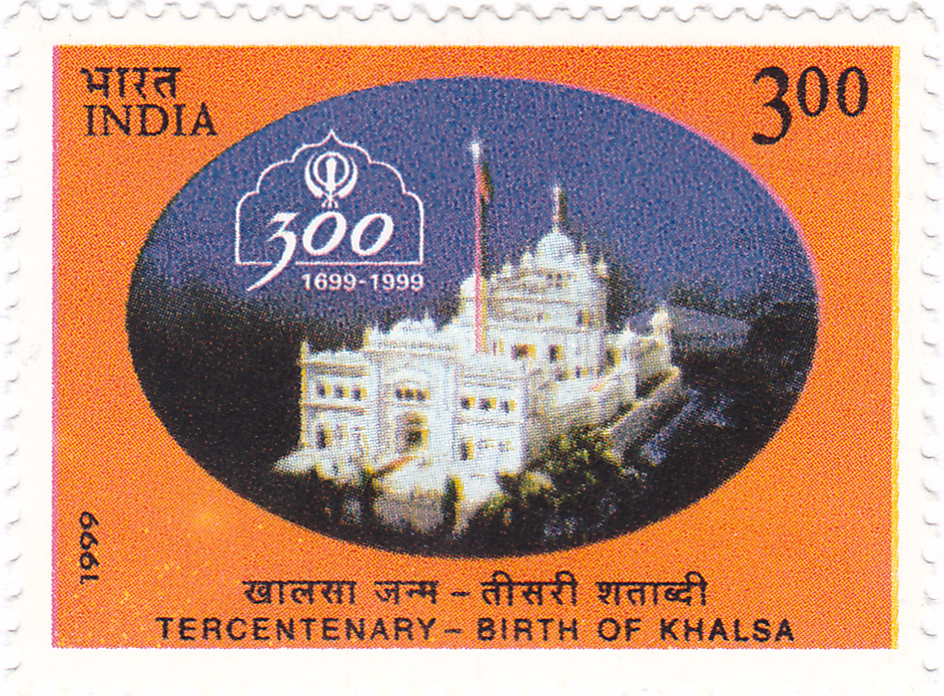
A 1999 stamp dedicated to the 300th anniversary of Khalsa

As per the popular account, in the year 1699, (Note: The early sources are not in agreement with the year the Khalsa was established, see the "Background" section for further details.) the tenth Guru of Sikhism, Guru Gobind Singh asked Sikhs to gather at Anandpur Sahib on 13 April 1699, the day of Vaisakhi, the annual harvest festival. Guru Gobind Singh addressed the congregation from the entryway of a tent pitched on a hill, now called Kesgarh Sahib. He drew his sword, according to the Sikh tradition, and then asked for a volunteer from those who gathered, someone willing to sacrifice his head. One came forward, whom he took inside a tent. The Guru returned to the crowd without the volunteer, but with a bloody sword.

He asked for another volunteer and repeated the same process of returning from the tent without anyone and with a bloodied sword four more times. After the fifth volunteer went with him into the tent, the Guru returned with all five volunteers, all safe. Rather, the Guru had slaughtered 5 goats from which the blood had appeared. He called the volunteers the Panj Pyare and the first Khalsa in the Sikh tradition. These five volunteers were: Daya Ram (Bhai Daya Singh), Dharam Das (Bhai Dharam Singh), Himmat Rai (Bhai Himmat Singh), Mohkam Chand (Bhai Mohkam Singh), and Sahib Chand (Bhai Sahib Singh).

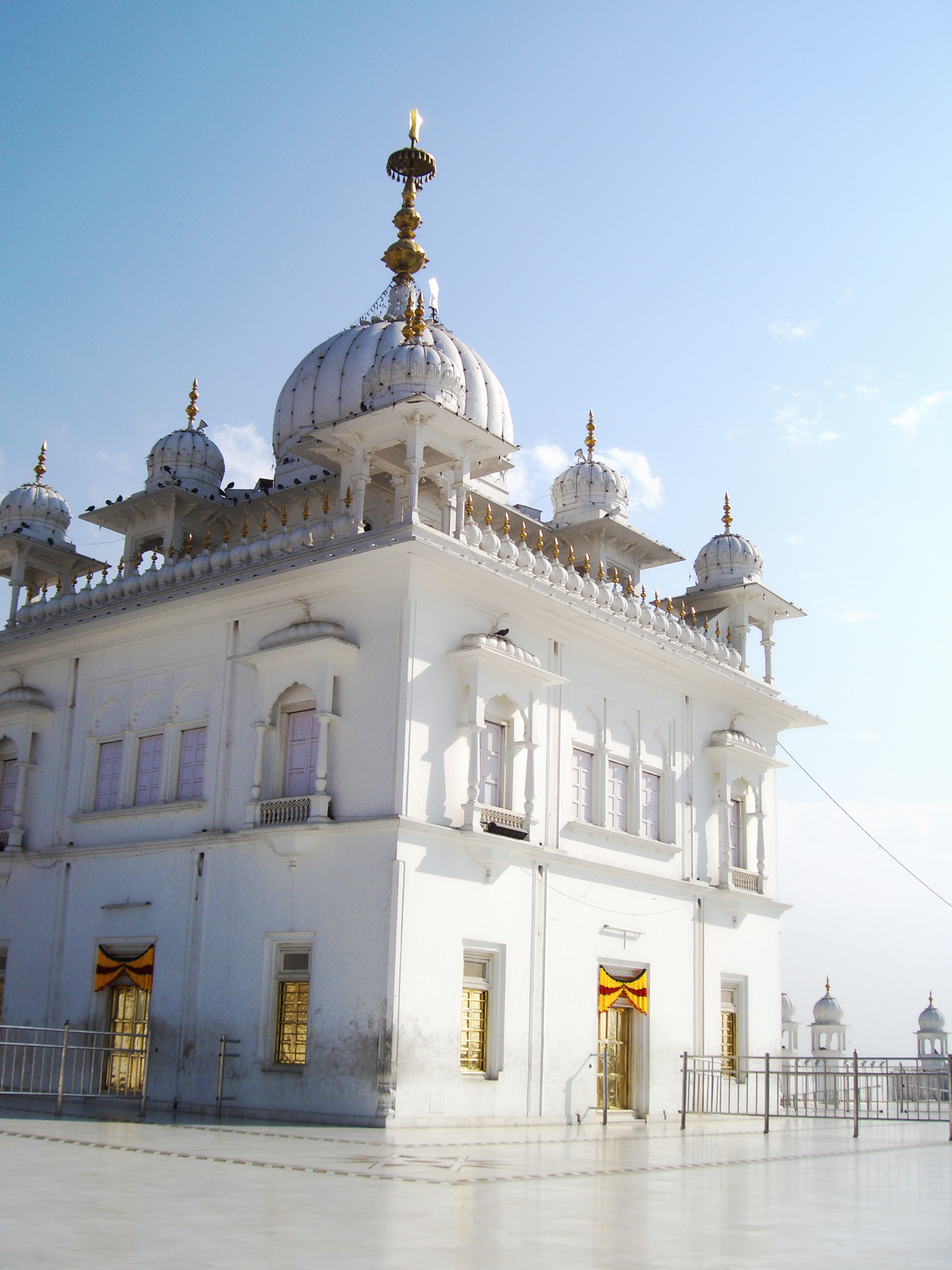
Keshgarh Sahib Gurudwara at Anandpur Sahib, Punjab, the birthplace of Khalsa

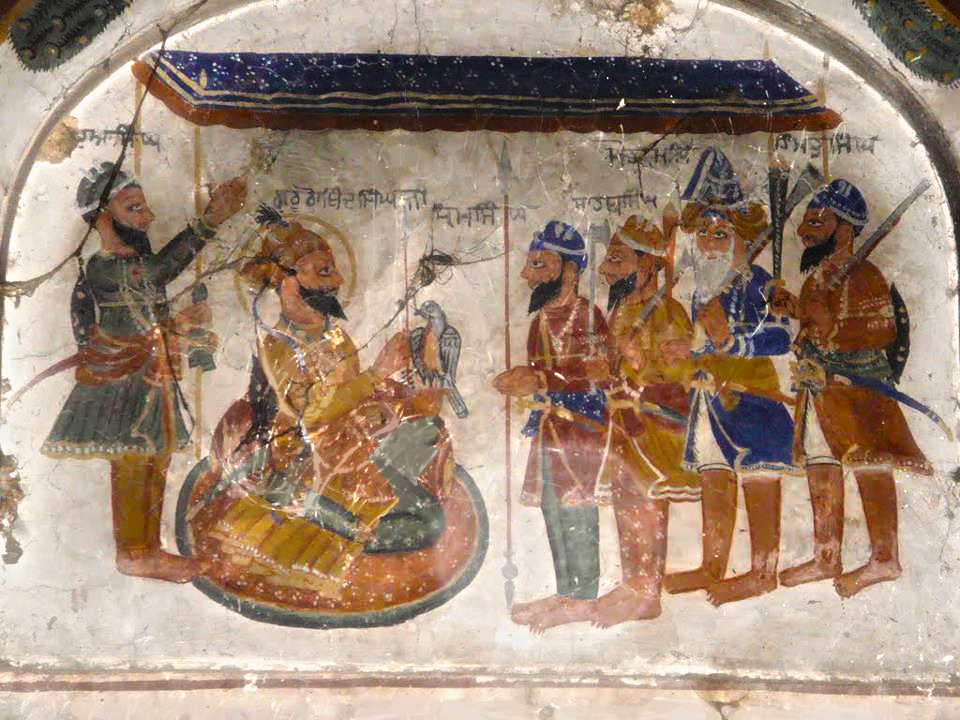
A fresco of Guru Gobind Singh and the Panj Piare.

Guru Gobind Singh then mixed water and sugar into an iron bowl, stirring it with a double-edged sword while reciting Gurbani to prepare what he called Amrit ("nectar"). He then administered this to the Panj Pyare, accompanied by recitations from the Adi Granth, thus founding the khanda ki pahul (baptism ceremony) of a Khalsa – a warrior community. After the first five Khalsa had been baptized, the Guru asked the five to baptize him as a Khalsa. This made the Guru the sixth Khalsa, and his name changed from Guru Gobind Rai to Guru Gobind Singh.

Around 80,000 men were initiated into the Khalsa order in a few days after its formalization on 13 April 1699.

He introduced ideas that indirectly challenged the discriminatory taxes imposed by Islamic authorities. For example, Aurangzeb had imposed taxes on non-Muslims that were collected from the Sikhs as well, for example the jizya (poll tax on non-Muslims), pilgrim tax and Bhaddar tax – the last being a tax to be paid by anyone following the Hindu ritual of shaving the head after the death of a loved one and cremation. Guru Gobind Singh declared that Khalsa does not need to continue this practice, because Bhaddar is not dharam, but a bharam (illusion). Not shaving the head also meant not having to pay the taxes of Sikhs who lived in Delhi and other parts of the Mughal Empire. However, the new code of conduct also led to internal disagreements between Sikhs in the 18th century, particularly between the Nanakpanthi and the Khalsa.

Guru Gobind Singh had a deep respect for the Khalsa, and stated that there is no difference between the True Guru and the Sangat (panth). Before he found the Khalsa, the Sikh movement had used the Sanskrit word Sisya (literally, disciple or student), but the favored term thereafter became Khalsa. Additionally, before the Khalsa, the Sikh congregations across India had a system of Masands appointed by the Sikh Gurus. The Masands led the local Sikh communities, and local temples collected wealth and donations for the Sikh cause.

Guru Gobind Singh concluded that the Masands system had become corrupt, he abolished them and introduced a more centralized system with the help of Khalsa that was under his direct supervision. These developments created two groups of Sikhs, those who initiated as Khalsa, and others who remained Sikhs but did not undertake the initiation. The Khalsa Sikhs saw themselves as a separate religious entity, while the Nanak-panthi Sikhs retained their different perspective.

The Khalsa warrior community tradition started by Guru Gobind Singh has contributed to modern scholarly debate on pluralism within Sikhism. His tradition has survived into modern times, with initiated Sikhs referred to as Khalsa Sikhs, while those who do not get baptized are referred to as Sahajdhari Sikhs.

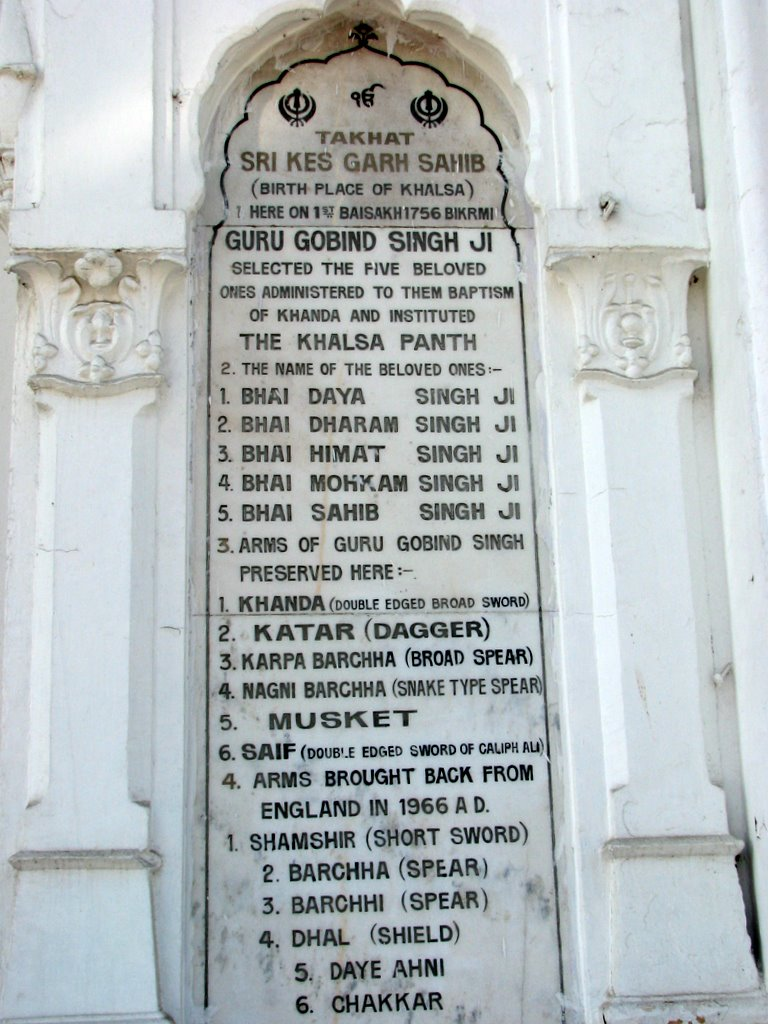
An inscription naming the five members of the Khalsa Panth, at Takht Keshgarh Sahib, the birthplace of Khalsa on Baisakh 1, 1756 Vikram Samvat.

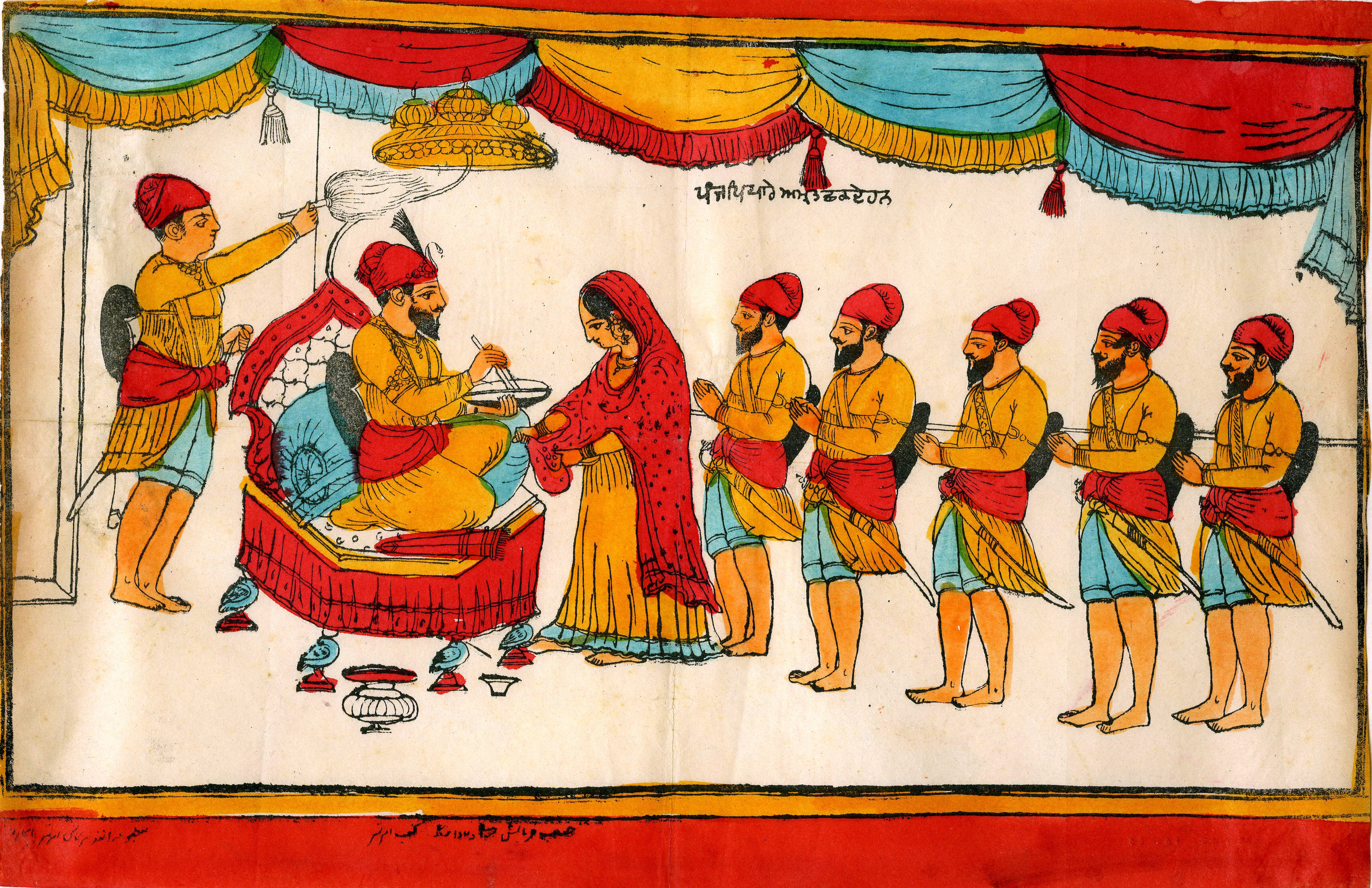
The creation of the Khalsa; initiated by Guru Gobind Singh, the tenth Sikh Guru.

== Dress and code of conduct ==
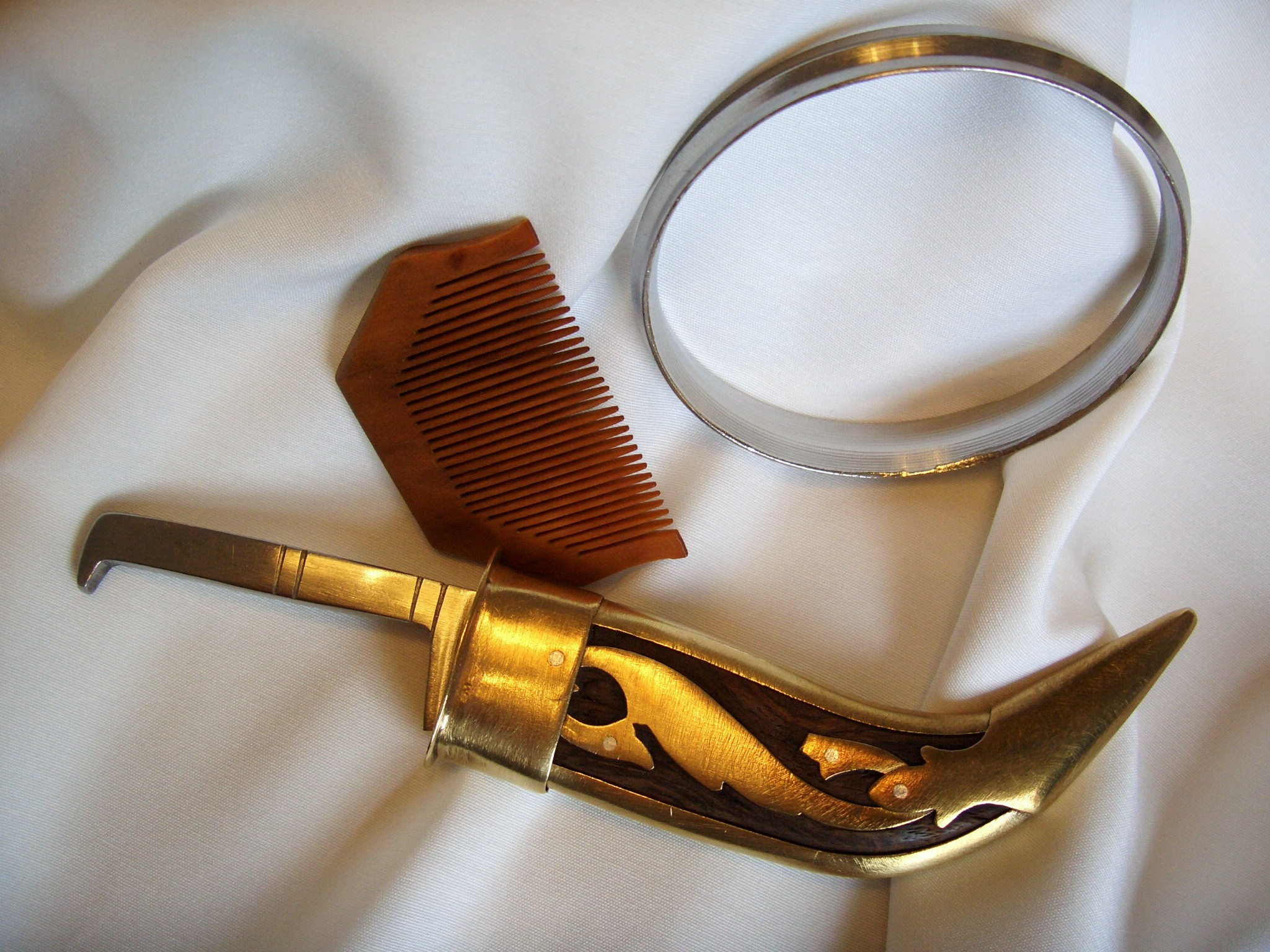
Kangha, Kara and Kirpan – three of the five Ks

Guru Gobind Singh initiated the Five Ks tradition of the Khalsa,

- Kesh: uncut hair.
- Kangha: a wooden comb.
- Kara: an iron or steel bracelet worn on the wrist.
- Kirpan: a sword or dagger.
- Kachera: short breeches.

He also announced a code of discipline for Khalsa warriors. Tobacco, eating meat slaughtered according to Muslim ritual and sexual intercourse with any person other than a spouse were forbidden. The Khalsas also agreed to never interact with those who followed rivals or their successors. The co-initiation of men and women from different castes into the ranks of Khalsa also institutionalized the principle of equality in Sikhism regardless of one's caste or gender. According to Owen and Sambhi, Guru Gobind Singh's significance to the Sikh tradition has been very important, as he institutionalized the Khalsa, resisted the ongoing persecution by the Mughal Empire, and continued "defense of Sikhism and Hinduism against the Muslim assault of Aurangzeb".

According to the Sikh Code of Conduct (Sikh Rehat Maryada), Amritdhari Khalsa Sikh men must wear a turban and the 5 Ks. Baptized women are not required to tie a turban, and it remains a personal choice. It also clearly states that it is not appropriate for Sikh women to cover their faces with any type of veil as practiced in the Indian, Islamic, or Judeo-Christian traditions. Piercing of the nose or ears for wearing ornaments is forbidden for Sikh men and women. Sikhs cannot wear any token of any other faith. Sikhs must not have their head bare or wear caps. They also cannot wear any ornaments piercing through any part of the body.

=== Prohibitions ===
The four prohibitions or mandatory restrictions of the Khalsa or life of Khalsa at the time of Guru Gobind Singh are:

1. Not to disturb the natural growth of the hairs.
2. Not to eat the Kutha meat.
3. Not to cohabit with a person other than one's spouse.
4. Not to use tobacco, alcohol or any type of drugs.

A Khalsa who breaks any code of conduct is no longer a Khalsa and is excommunicated from the Khalsa Panth and must go and 'pesh' (get baptized again). Guru Gobind Singh also gave the Khalsa 52 hukams or 52 specific additional guidelines while living in Nanded in 1708.

== Guruship of the Khalsa (Guru Panth) ==
The guruship of the collective Khalsa, as realized through the collective body of "committed" Amritdharis (baptized Sikhs), is known as the Guru Panth. The Sikh Rehat Maryada states "The Guru Panth (Panth's status of Guruhood) means the whole body of committed baptized Sikhs. This body was fostered by all the ten Gurus and the tenth Guru gave it its final shape and invested it with Guruhood". A Khalsa Sikh is expected to go above-and-beyond duties such as partaking in the langar service, seva, or fanning the chaur sahib (fly-whisk) in-congregation. A Khalsa Sikh is also expected to materialize their life as "benevolent exertion" that secures the most good with the most minimal intervention, realized through "collective action". Thus, a Sikh not only has individualistic duties, but also duties relating to the collective of the Khalsa, as the Sikh is one unit of the Guru Panth.

The Khalsa is considered equal to the Guru in Sikhism.

The five men, known as the Panj Pyare or the Five Beloved Ones, were baptized by the Guru and given the title of Singh, which means lion. They were then given the Amrit, a mixture of sugar and water stirred with a sword, and were asked to drink it. The significance of the Khalsa is reflected in the fact that Guru Gobind Singh considered it his equal. He allowed the Panj Pyare to give him Tankah, or punishment. There are instances where this occurred, as reported in the Suraj Prakash.

Guru Gobind Singh demonstrated his respect for the Panj Pyare by bowing down to them and asking them to baptize him. This act is known as the Pahul ceremony or Amrit Sanchar, and it is still performed in Sikhism today. The Guru's act of bowing down to the Panj Pyare was a symbolic gesture of the Guru's humility and his recognition of the Panj Pyare's spiritual authority as being equal to his own.

The Panj Pyare, in turn, demonstrated their loyalty to the Guru by baptizing him and giving him the title of Singh, as well as still revering him as the Guru. This act was a recognition of the Guru's spiritual authority and his commitment to the principles of Sikhism. The Panj Pyare were not just the Guru's disciples; they were also his equals (collectively) and his companions in the struggle for justice and equality. Guru Gobind Singh wrote two famous excerpts collectively known as the Khalsa Mahima, which can be found in the Dasam Granth and Sarbloh Granth. Below is an excerpt of the Khalsa Mahima from the Sarbloh Granth:

ਖ਼ਾਲਸਾ ਮੇਰੀ ਜਾਤ ਅਰ ਪਤ ॥ ਖ਼ਾਲਸਾ ਸੋ ਮਾ ਕੋ ਉਤਪਤ ॥ ਖ਼ਾਲਸਾ ਮੇਰੋ ਭਵਨ ਭੰਡਾਰਾ ॥ ਖ਼ਾਲਸੇ ਕਰ ਮੇਰੋ ਸਤਿਕਾਰਾ ॥ ਖ਼ਾਲਸਾ ਮੇਰੋ ਸਵਜਨ ਪਰਵਾਰਾ ॥ ਖ਼ਾਲਸਾ ਮੇਰੋ ਕਰਤ ਉਧਾਰਾ ॥ ਖ਼ਾਲਸਾ ਮੇਰੋ ਪਿੰਡ ਪਰਾਨ ॥ ਖ਼ਾਲਸਾ ਮੇਰੀ ਜਾਨ ਕੀ ਜਾਨ ॥

romanized: khālasā mērī jāta ara pata. khālasā sō mā kō utapāta. khālasā mērō bhavana bhaṇḍārā. khālasē kara mērō satikārā. khālasā mērō savajana paravārā. khālasā mērō karata udhārā. khālasā mērō piṇḍa parāna. khālasā mērī jāna kī jāna.

Translation: Khalsa is my caste & creed. Because of the Khalsa, I was born. Khalsa is my world treasure. Because of the Khalsa, I have respect. Khalsa is my close family. Khalsa grants me favours. Khalsa is my body and soul. Khalsa is the breath of my life.

- Sri Manglacharan Purana, pages 519–524, Khalsa Mero Rup Hai Khas

The famous writer Bhai Gurdas Singh (not to be confused with Bhai Gurdas) notes in his book of compositions, or vāran:

ਵਾਹਵਾਹਗੋਬਿੰਦਸਿੰਘਆਪੇਗੁਰੁਚੇਲਾ ॥੧॥

vāha vāha gōbinda siṅgha āpē guru celā

"Hail, hail (Guru) Gobind Singh, himself Master and Disciple."

- Bhai Gurdas Singh Ji Vaaran

Whilst Guru Gobind Singh passed on the mantle of guruship to both the Guru Granth and Guru Panth, the practice of Guru Panth was prevalent in the 18th century during the era of the Sikh Confederacy but fell into obscurity during the rise of Ranjit Singh. Today, the Guru Panth is rarely evoked, being overshadowed by the more popular Guru Granth.

== Martiality ==
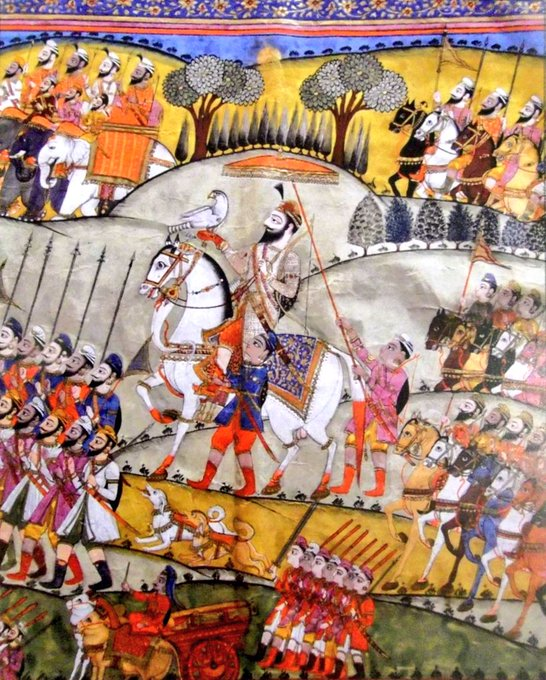
Painting of Guru Gobind Singh on horseback marching with his army of Sikhs

A Khalsa is enjoined, to be honest, treat everyone as equal, meditate on God, maintain his fidelity, resist tyranny and religious persecution of oneself and others.

One of the duties of the Khalsa is to practice arms. This has been deemed necessary due to the rising persecution of the rulers. Before joining the Khalsa, most of the people were from professions like farming, pottery, masonry, carpenters, Labanas, etc.

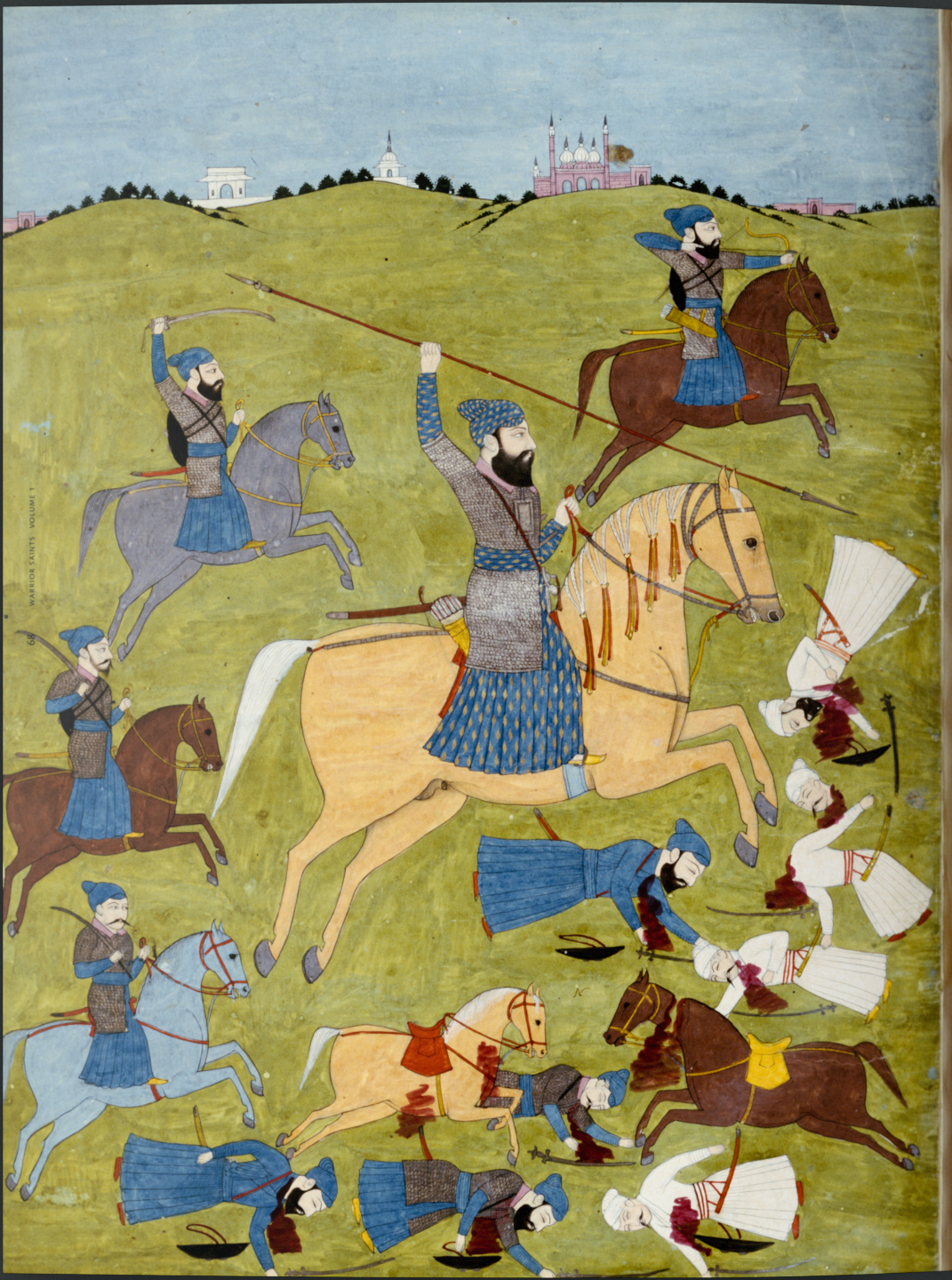
Painting from an illustrated folio of a Mughal manuscript depicting the Battle of Sirhind (1710), also known as the Battle of Chappar Chiri. From the 'Tawarikh-i Jahandar Shah', Awadh or Lucknow, ca.1770. The Sikh Khalsa forces are dressed in blue whilst the Mughals are wearing white

Guru Gobind Singh in Oct 1708 deputed his disciple Banda Singh Bahadur to lead the Khalsa in an uprising against the Mughals. Banda Singh Bahadur first established a Sikh republic and then brought in the land reforms in the form of breaking up large estates and distributing the land to peasants. He and his comrades were eventually defeated and executed, but he became an icon among the Sikhs. After a long exile the Khalsa regrouped under Nawab Kapur Singh, who gathered local Khalsa leaders and created Dal Khalsa, a coalition army. The Dal Khalsa fought against the Mughals and the Afghans, eventually resulting in the establishment of a number of small aristocratic republics called misls (autonomous confederacies) and later in the formation of the Sikh Empire.

After the fall of the Mughal Empire and the later establishment of the Sikh Empire in Punjab, the Khalsa was converted into a strong, multi-religious and multinational fighting force, modernized according to European principles: the Sikh Khalsa Army which had a huge role in the expansion of the empire. Led by generals like: Maharaja Ranjit Singh himself, Misr Diwan Chand and Hari Singh Nalwa. It successfully defeated all its adversaries, including the Afghan tribals and army, Hill Chiefs, Misldars, Chinese, Tibeans and Gorkhas. By the time of death of the Maharaja Ranjit Singh in 1839, the whole army of Sikh Empire was assessed at 120,000 men, with 250 artillery pieces. The irregular levies were included.

The official name of the state (Sikh Empire) of Sikhs was "Sarkar-i-Khalsa": Government of the Khalsa. The boundaries of this state stretched from Tibet to Afghanistan and from Kashmir to Sutlej in the south and included regions of Punjab, Khyber Pakhtunkhwa, Kashmir, Ladakh, etc. The "Sarkar-i-Khalsa" was dissolved during two wars fought against the British between 1846 and 1849.

== Initiation ==
Initiation into the Khalsa is referred to as Amrit Sanchar (water of immortality life-cycle rite) or Khande di Pahul (Initiation with the double edged sword). Anyone from any previous religion, age, caste, or knowledge group can take Amrit (ਅੰਮ੍ਰਿਤ ਛਕਣਾ ammrită chhakăṇā) when they are convinced that they are ready. This baptism is done by the Panj Pyare in front of the Guru Granth Sahib. The devotee must arrive at the place of baptism, usually a Gurdwara, in the morning after bathing completely including having washed their hair and must be wearing the 5 articles of the Khalsa uniform.

After baptism, the new Singh or Kaur must abide by the four restrictions or must get re-baptised if they break any of them. Initiates into the Khalsa are required to take-on Guru Gobind Singh and Mata Sahib Kaur as their spiritual father and mother, respectively.

=== Initiation of women ===
Joseph Davey Cunningham (1812–1851) noted a form of initiation of women into the Khalsa in existence in 1849, the year of the British conquest of the Punjab:

"Women are not usually, but they are sometimes, initiated in form as professors of the Sikh faith. In mingling the sugar and water for women, a one-edged, and not a two-edged, dagger is used."

According to W.H. McLeod, the early-1700s rahitnama of Chaupa Singh Chhibbar mentioned "the need for a bride to be initiated, but it seems that in this case a different form of initiation was required" beside that of sword initiation (the older carana amrita initiation). McLeod nevertheless considered the Khalsa as a primarily male institution, speculating that "progress" took place in the period between the Guru era and the Sikh Empire.

Rahitnamas produced shortly after the Khalsa's inauguration communicate various notions surrounding women. Prescribing another form of initiation, the exhortations and directives within them, addressed to men, are interpreted by McLeod and Doris Jakobsh as women being ancillaries to the initiated men, as opposed to having a formal role. They mandate men to respect women in the same manner that is rendered to their mother, prohibit violence against them, cursing them, and engaging in extramarital affairs. They further regard women as innately untrustworthy never to be confided in or relied on. Men were to partake in righteous warfare and protect their families, whereas women were expected to be housewives raising their children and providing service for their husbands. The Tat Khalsa continued efforts in the 1900s to allow women the same initiation as men, which was later emphatically advocated for and codified in the Sikh Rehat Maryada.

Gilbert Lewis, an anthropologist, wrote that the rigid delimitation between men and women in the praxis of the Khalsa stemmed from a need to enhance esotericism within their institution and create a tightly bonded brotherhood ready to deal with the harsh exigencies of war and defence. This also manifested through the disparity between male and female naming conventions as prescribed by Guru Gobind Singh; men were mandated the compulsory identifier of Singh, whereas women received no such dictum.

Nikky Guninder Kaur Singh, in her explication of the inauguration of the Khalsa, maintained that women were allowed into the Khalsa and received the title of Kaur, which she purports was congruent with and indicative of the inherent egalitarianism of the Sikh tradition. She would later write that the exact historical origins of the conferral of "Kaur" were obscure, though it had occurred for both sexes in pre-modern times. Her claims were criticized by Doris Jakobsh who argued that her interpretation aligned with Tat Khalsa interpolations as opposed to historical precedent; while early historical sources extensively mention Singh as the male Sikh appellation, there was complete silence on injunctions regarding female nomenclature. Jakobsh contends that the initiation of women into the Khalsa "appears to be" a later development, "possibly" originated with the Namdharis, who later during the British Raj, were particularly active in preaching for the upliftment of women and against pervading social taboos, According to Jaspal Kaur Singh, the baptism of women and the bestowal of Kaur was incipient only during the colonial period, during which the Tat Khalsa sought to combat perceived threats to Sikhism, both from Christian and Arya Samaj proselytization, by removing "Hinduized" and "un-Sikh" cultural and religious practices from within their fold and accentuating egalitarian practices. Jakobsh further posits that as the military ethos of the Sikhs reached its apogee under the mandate of Guru Gobind Singh, women were concomitantly made to undertake more traditional roles. She cites the Chaupa Singh rahitnama and tales from the Charitropakhyan to support her hypothesis; women were often depicted as seducers in the Charitropakhyan, and as the "antithesis" of the men of warrior-saint status that the Guru wanted to inculcate in his order. According to Merry Wiesner-Hanks, as the influence of the Khalsa grew, women and those not in the Khalsa brotherhood were relegated to secondary status in the Sikh community.

J. S. Grewal considers Jakobsh to be fascinated by the "theology of difference," and oversimplifying the issue; Gurinder Singh Mann, not attributing the Charitropakhyan to Guru Gobind Singh, considers both the analyses of Nikky Singh and Jakobsh to be lopsided, as in his view they both glean selectively from the Dasam Granth.

== Initial tensions with the non-Khalsa disciples ==
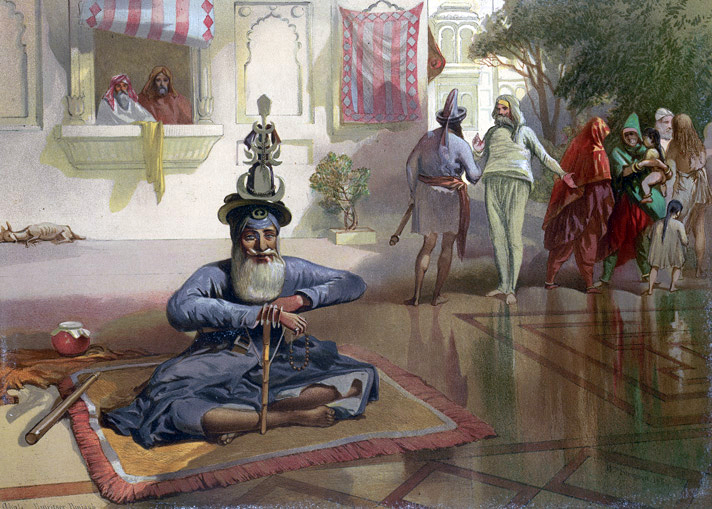
Akalis at the Holy Tank

With the creation of Khalsa, Guru Gobind Singh abolished all existing social divisions in line with the teachings of Guru Nanak Dev. In their new order, the former lowest of the low would stand with the former highest; all would become one and drink from the same vessel. All previous beliefs relating to family, occupation, customs and ceremonies were declared useless by the Guru. This caused discomfort to the conservative followers of the Guru and they protested. Many departed from the ceremony, but the Guru declared that the low castes should be raised and would dwell next to him.

The newswriter of the Mughal government, Ghulam Mohyiuddin, reporting to the emperor wrote:

He has abolished caste and custom, old rituals, beliefs and superstitions of the Hindus and bonded them in one single brotherhood. No one will be superior or inferior to another. Men of all castes have been made to eat out of the single bowl. Though orthodox men have opposed him, about twenty thousand men and women have taken baptism of steel at his hand on the first day. The Guru has also told the gathering: "I'll call myself Shri Guru Gobind Singh Ji only if I can make the meek sparrows pounce upon the hawks and tear them; only if one combatant of my force faces a legion of the enemy"

Sri Gur Sobha (18th century) by Senapati contains two sections (adhyays) on the controversies that arose, when Guru Gobind Singh's disciples in Delhi heard the news of his new order. Much of the controversy stated in Sri Gur Sobha revolves around bhaddar, the ritual shaving of the head after the death of a close relative, which was discouraged by Guru Gobind Singh. According to Sainapti, while creating the Khalsa, Guru Gobind Singh said that bhaddar is bharam (illusion), and not dharam.

Tensions developed between the Punjabi Khatri disciples of the Guru in Delhi, and members of the newly formed Khalsa. A prominent Khatri disciple was expelled from the place of worship (dharmasala) for refusing to join the Khalsa. Another disciple was expelled for eating with him, starting a chain of further expulsions. The expelled disciples convened a community gathering, at which two wealthy Khatris demanded that the Khalsa produce a written order from the Guru that a new mandatory code of conduct had been promulgated.

A Khatri family that refused to follow the bhaddar ritual was boycotted by the Khatri community. The Khatri council (panch) closed the bazaar to pressure the Khalsa. The Khalsa petitioned the state officials to intervene, who forced the reopening of the shops. Later, peace was established between the two groups in a sangat (congregation). However, hostility between some Khatris and the Khalsa persisted in the later years.

In contrast to the Khalsa Sikh, a Sahajdhari Sikh is one who reveres the teachings of the Sikh Gurus, but has not undergone the initiation. Sahajdhari Sikhs do not accept some or all elements of the dress and behavioral codes of the Khalsa Sikhs.

== Contemporary status ==
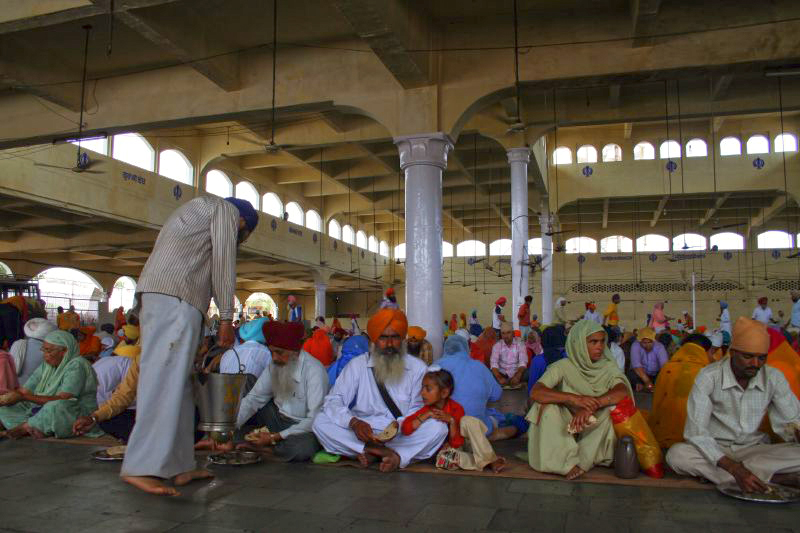
Khalsa principles of Deg to cook food (langar) in huge amount

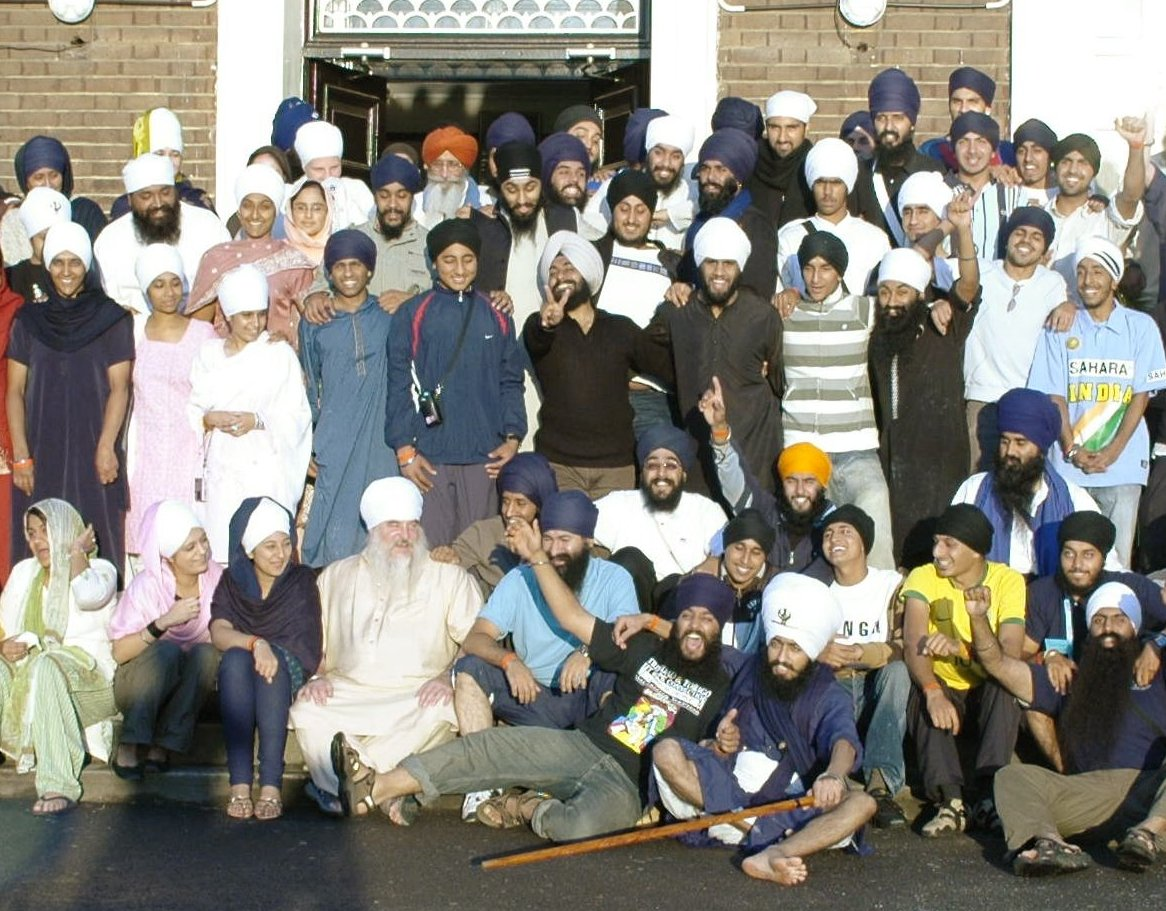
A group of Khalsa Sikhs

Today, the Khalsa is respected by the entire gamut of Sikhs; however, not all Sikhs are Amritdharis. The issue of Khalsa code of conduct has led to several controversies. In the early 1950s, a serious split occurred in the Canadian Sikh community, when the Khalsa Diwan Society in Vancouver, British Columbia elected a clean-shaven Sikh to serve on its management committee. Although most of the early Sikh immigrants to Canada were non-Khalsa, and a majority of the members of the society were clean-shaven non-Khalsa Sikhs, a faction objected to the election of a non-Khalsa to the management committee. The factions in Vancouver and Victoria, British Columbia broke away from the Khalsa Diwan Society and established their gurdwara society called Akali Singh.

The Khalsa has been predominantly a male institution in Sikh history, with Khalsa authority with the male leaders. In the contemporary era, it has become open to women but its authority remains with Sikh men.

3HO is a Western sect that emerged in 1971, founded by Harbhajan Singh Khalsa also known as Yogi Bhajan. It requires both men and women to wear turbans, and adopt the surname Khalsa.

Each year the Khalsa display their military skills around the world at a festival called Hola Mohalla. During Hola Mohalla, military exercises are performed alongside mock battles followed by kirtan and valor poetry competitions. The Khalsa also lead the Sikhs in the annual Vaisakhi parade.

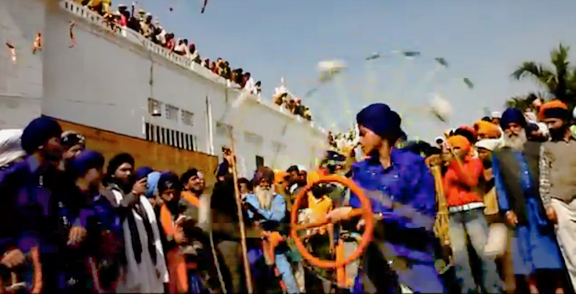
The Khalsa celebrating the Sikh festival Hola Mohalla or simply Hola.

== See also ==
- Chakram
- Gatka
- Khalsa Heritage Memorial Complex
- Langar
- Nihang
- Sects of Sikhism
- Shastar Vidya
- Sikh history
- Rehat
- Prohibitions in Sikhism
- Diet in Sikhism
- Meat consumption among Sikhs
- Khalsa bole
- Sarbat Khalsa

== Cited sources ==
- Cole, William Owen; Sambhi, Piara Singh (1995). The Sikhs: Their Religious Beliefs and Practices. Sussex Academic Press. ISBN 978-1-898723-13-4.
- Deol, Jeevan (2001). "Eighteenth Century Khalsa Identity: Discourse, Praxis and Narrative". In Arvind-pal Singh and Mandair, Gurharpal Singh and Christopher Shackle (ed.). Sikh Religion, Culture and Ethnicity. Routledge. pp. 25–26. ISBN 978-0700713899. OCLC 45337782.
- Dhavan, P. (2011) When Sparrows Became Hawks: The Making of the Sikh Warrior Tradition, 1699–1799, Oxford University Press: Oxford. ISBN 978-0-19-975655-1.
- Nesbitt, Eleanor (2016). Sikhism: A Very Short Introduction. Oxford University Press. ISBN 978-0-19-874557-0.
- Singh, Pashaura; Fenech, Louis E. (2014). The Oxford Handbook of Sikh Studies. Oxford University Press. ISBN 978-0-19-969930-8.
