= Sahib Singh (Sikh martyr) =

Sikh martyr

Bhai / Pyare Sahib Singh Ji
- ਸਾਹਿਬ ਸਿੰਘ
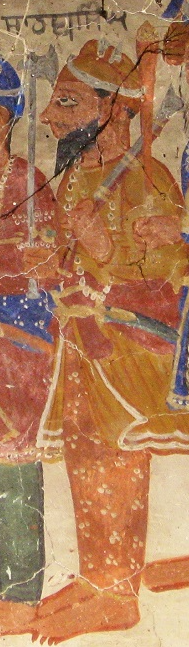
- Sahib Singh, one of the inaugural/original Panj Pyare, depicted in an old Sikh fresco from inside an abandoned Sikh samadhi located in Kot Fateh Khan, Attock, Punjab, Pakistan

Panj Pyare
- In office 1699 – 1704 or 1705

Personal life
- Born: Sahib Chand Nai; 17 June 1663 Bidar (present-day Karnataka, India)
- Died: 7 December 1704 or 1705 Chamkaur, Punjab, India
- Cause of death: Killed in action
- Parents: Bhai Guru Narayana (father); Ankamma Bai (mother)
- Known for: Member of the original, inaugural Panj Pyare; was the fifth and final one to answer the call by the Guru for a head
- Occupation: Barber

Religious life
- Religion: Sikhism
- Institute: Khalsa

Sahib Singh (Punjabi: ਸਾਹਿਬ ਸਿੰਘ (Gurmukhi); 17 June 1663 – 7 December 1704 or 1705) was one of the Panj Pyare (or the Five beloved ones). He was formerly known as Sahib Chand and was born into the Nai caste (also transliterated as Naee) before being baptized into the Khalsa tradition.

== Biography ==
=== Early life ===
There are different versions of different scholars regarding the birth place and family members of Sahib Singh, although all accept the fact that he was born into a family of barbers.

Early Sikh literature claims Sahib Singh was the reincarnation of Bhagat Sain.

==== Birth ====
Regarding birthplace:

- The most popular and acceptable belief is that he was born in Bidar in present-day Karnataka.
- As per Mahankosh, Bhai Sahib Singh was born at Nangal Shaheedan in 4, Harh Samvat 1722, District Hoshiarpur. Using the European calendar, this means he was born in 1665; he died in 1705.

==== Family background ====
Regarding father and mother name:

- As per Mahankosh, He was born to Bishan Devi and Tulsi Ram (or Charan Ram), a Barber.
- Another tradition believes that he was son of Bhai Guru Narayana (a barber of Bidar in Karnataka) and his wife

=== Later life ===
Bhai Sahib died in the battle of Chamkaur on 7 December 1705 with Bhai Himmat Singh and Bhai Mohkam Singh.
