= Dharam Singh (Sikhism) =

Sikh saint

Bhai / Pyare Dharam Singh Ji
- ਧਰਮ ਸਿੰਘ
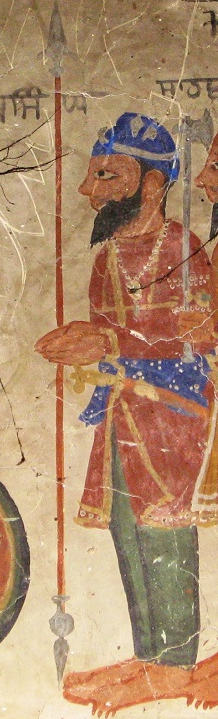
- Dharam Singh, one of the inaugural/original Panj Pyare, depicted in an old Sikh fresco from inside an abandoned Sikh samadhi located in Kot Fateh Khan, Attock, Punjab, Pakistan

Panj Pyare
- In office 1699–1708

Personal life
- Born: Dharam Das; 1666 Near Ganges River, Hastinapur (present-day Uttar Pradesh, India)
- Died: 1708 (aged 42) Nanded, India
- Cause of death: Martyrdom
- Parents: Sant Ram (father); Mai Sabho (mother)
- Known for: Member of the original, inaugural Panj Pyare; was the fourth or second to answer the call by the Guru for a head
- Occupation: Agriculturalist

Religious life
- Religion: Sikhism
- Institute: Khalsa

Dharam Singh (Punjabi: ਧਰਮ ਸਿੰਘ (Gurmukhi); 1666–1708), born as Dharam Das, was one of the original Panj Pyare or the Five Beloved, the forerunners of the Khalsa.

== Biography ==
He was the son of Chaudhary Sant Ram and Mai Sabho of the village Hastinapur (modern-day Meerut District, Uttar Pradesh, India). He was born into the Jat caste. Originally said to be fourth position of the inaugural group of Panj Pyare according to older historical sources, he was upgraded to second in-position by later sources.

Dharam Singh reunited with and accompanied the Guru in the Malwa region in the aftermath of the Second Battle of Chamkaur. He, alongside Bhai Daya Singh, were the two Sikhs entrusted with delivering the Guru's Zafarnama letter to Mughal emperor Aurangzeb. They were dispatched from either Kangar village, Bathinda or Dina village, Moga, for this purpose.

He was seen as the reincarnation of Bhagat Dhanna in early Sikh literature.
