= Women in Sikhism =

Principles of Sikhi and women

The principles of Sikhism state that women have the same souls as men and thus possess an equal right to cultivate their spirituality with equal chances of achieving salvation. Women participate in all Sikh religious, cultural, social, and secular activities including lead religious congregations, take part in the Akhand Path (the continuous recitation of the Holy Scriptures), perform Kirtan (congregational singing of hymns), perform Gatka (Sikh martial art) and work as a Granthis.

Guru Nanak proclaimed the equality of men and women and both he and the gurus that succeeded him encouraged men and women to take a full part in all the activities of Sikh worship and practice. Sikh history also has recorded the role of women, portraying them as equals to men in service, devotion, sacrifice, and bravery.

== History ==
There are many examples of women who are considered models of service and sacrifice throughout Sikh history, such as Mata Gujri, Mai Bhago, Mata Sundari, Mata Desan Kaur, Rani Sahib Kaur, Rani Sada Kaur, Rani Datar Kaur and Maharani Jind Kaur.

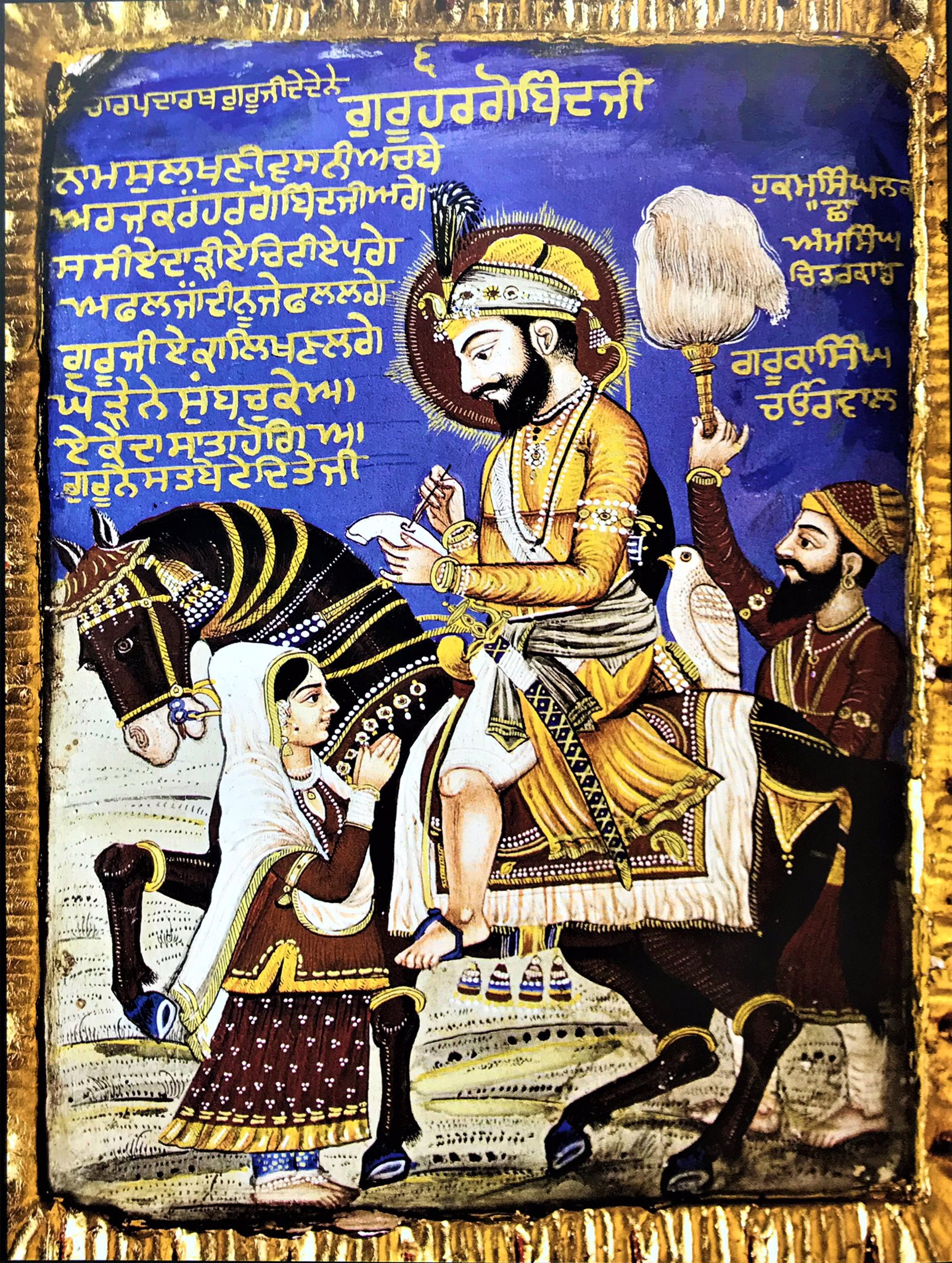
Fresco art from Takht Hazur Sahib depicting Guru Hargobind granting devotee Mai Sulakhani's wish for children by writing the numeral one (੧) but his horse kicked and the Guru wrote the numeral seven (੭) instead

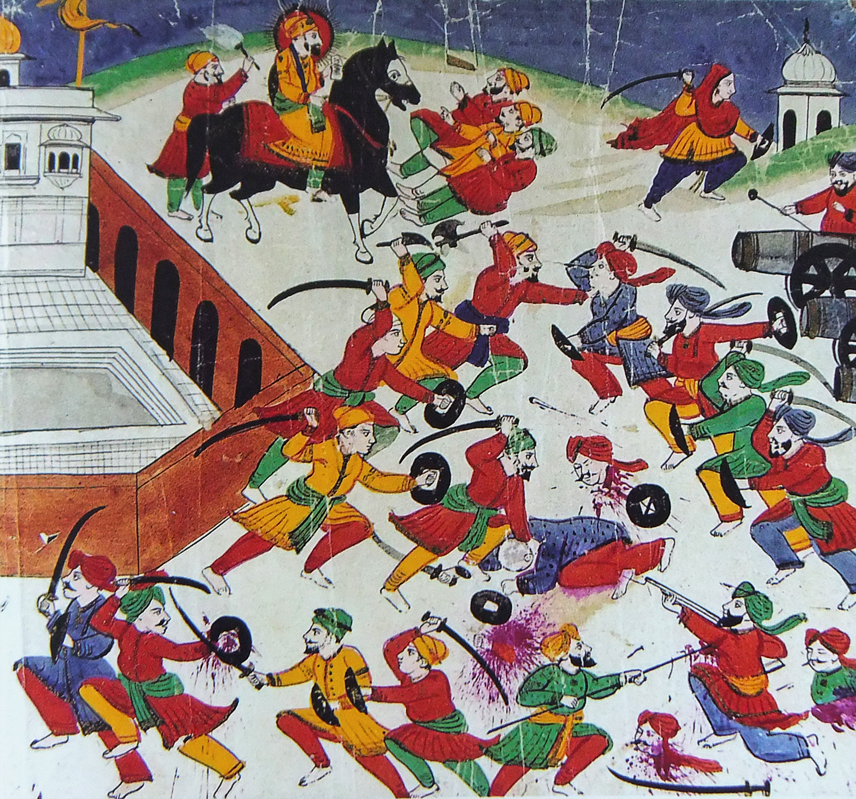
Mai Bhago (top right) in the battle of Muktsar; December 1705

The Sikh Gurus and various Sikh saints did much to progress women's rights which were considerably downtrodden in the 15th century. To ensure a new equal status for women, the Gurus made no distinction between the sexes in matters of initiation, instruction or participation in sangat (holy fellowship) and pangat (eating together).

According to Sarup Das Bhalla, Mahima Prakash, Guru Amar Das disfavoured the use of the veil by women. He assigned women to supervise some communities of disciples and preached against the custom of sati. Guru Amar Das also raised his voice against female infanticide. Guru Amar Das had appointed a Sikh woman, named Mai Matho, as head of one of the Manji diocese in-contrast to the prevailing patriarchal hierarchy of his era.

Guru Gobind Singh instructed the Khalsa to not associate with kanyapapi, those who sin towards woman, and the Guru was also strongly against the objectification of woman. The Guru gave those women who were baptized into the Khalsa, the surname of Kaur, the status of a sovereign princess.

During the 1790s, women of the ruling-house of the Patiala kingdom, namely Rani Rajinder Kaur and Rani Sahib Kaur, rallied the kingdom's troops to protect the polity from the Marathas.

Baba Ram Singh also did much for woman's rights including opposing infanticide, selling of young girls into servitude, the dowry system, the pardah system, and endeavored to achieve higher standards of literacy, and the remarriage of widows.

During the Sikh revival movement of Singh Sabha beginning in the 1870s, the Singh Sabha raised its voice against the purdah system, female infanticide, child marriage, sati, bad conditions of widows, practice of dowry and extravagant expenditure during marriage.

== Practices condemned ==
=== Sutak ===
Sutak is a belief associated with impurity of the house on account of birth of a child. It is also believed that women are most prone to such impurity. Guru Nanak condemned such notions of pollution/impurity in no uncertain terms.

Should Sutak be believed in, then that such impurity occurs everywhere, Worms are found in cow dung and the wood. No single grain of corn is without life in it. Water is the first source of life, and everyone is dependent on it for remaining alive. How can impurity of Sutak be warded off? It is to be found in every kitchen. Nanak says, pollution is not removed in this way (through rituals). It is washed away by knowledge of God (enlightenment).

— Guru Nanak, Guru Granth Sahib 472

=== Asceticism ===
The concept of Sannyasa had influenced attitude towards women in India. The inherent attraction of female was considered a temptation something that a Sannyasi must avoid. The Gurus, however, did not regard women as hurdles for attaining salvation. They rejected the idea of renunciation and regarded family life, if led in a righteous manner, better than the life of an ascetic. Instead of celibacy and renunciation, Guru Nanak recommends grihastha—the life of a householder.

=== Menstrual taboo ===
Menstruation does not lead to women being considered impure in Sikhism, and women's behavior is not restricted during the time when she is menstruating.

In The Feminine Principle in the Sikh Vision of the Transcendent, Nikky-Guninder Kaur Singh writes:

'The denigration of the female body "expressed in many cultural and religious taboos surrounding menstruation and child-Birth" is absent in the Sikh worldview. Guru Nanak openly chides those who attribute pollution to women because of menstruation'.

=== Polygamy ===
In a culture where monogamy is generally the rule, Sikh polygamy is exceptionally rare.

=== Female infanticide ===
Female infanticide is prohibited, and the Rahitnamas (codes of conduct) prohibit Sikhs from having any contact or relationship with those who indulge in this practice.

=== Sati (widow burning) ===
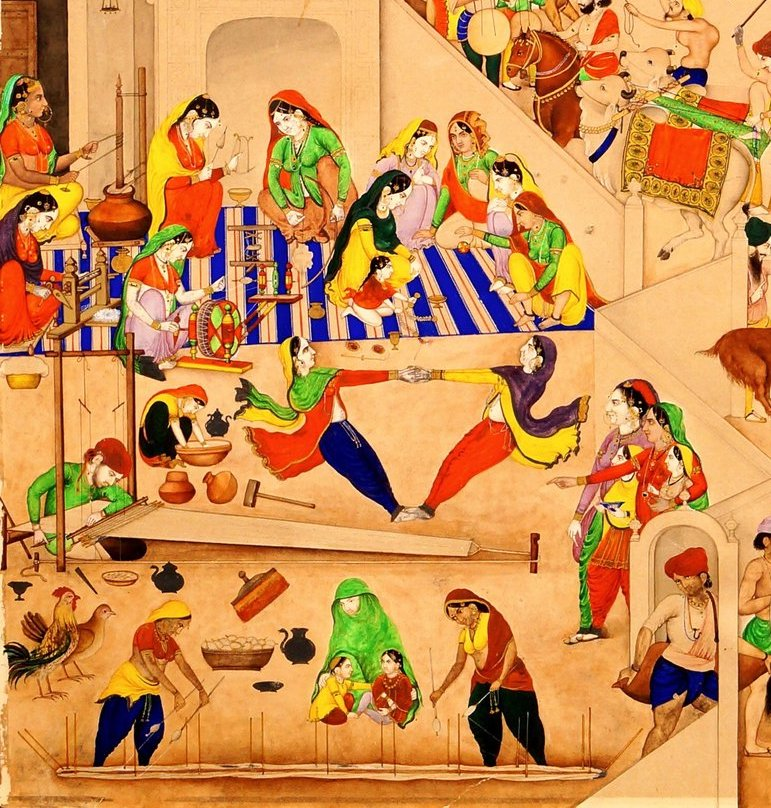
Women in Sikh Empire-era Amritsar, 19th century painting

Widow burning, or sati, is expressly forbidden by scripture.

Satis are not those that burn themselves on the husband's funeral pyre; satis are they, O Nanak, who die of the pangs of separation (from the supreme God)

— Guru Amar Das, Guru Granth Sahib 787

As a practical step towards discouraging the practice of sati Sikhism permits remarriage of widows.

=== Veil ===
Sikhism was highly critical of all forms of strict veiling, Sikh Gurus condemned it and rejected seclusion and veiling of women, which saw decline of veiling among some classes during late medieval period. This was stressed by Bhagat Kabir.

Stay, stay, O daughter-in-law - do not cover your face with a veil. In the end, this shall not bring you even half a shell. The one before you used to veil her face; do not follow in her footsteps. The only merit in veiling your face is that for a few days, people will say, "What a noble bride has come". Your veil shall be true only if you skip, dance and sing the Glorious Praises of the Lord. Says Kabeer, the soul-bride shall win, only if she passes her life singing the Lord's Praises.

— Bhagat Kabir, Guru Granth Sahib 484

=== Dowry ===
Guru Ram Das condemned the ritual of dowry.

Any other dowry, which the self-willed manmukhs offer for show, is only false egotism and a worthless display. O my father, please give me the Name of the Lord God as my wedding gift and dowry.

— Guru Ram Das, Guru Granth Sahib 79

== Equality ==
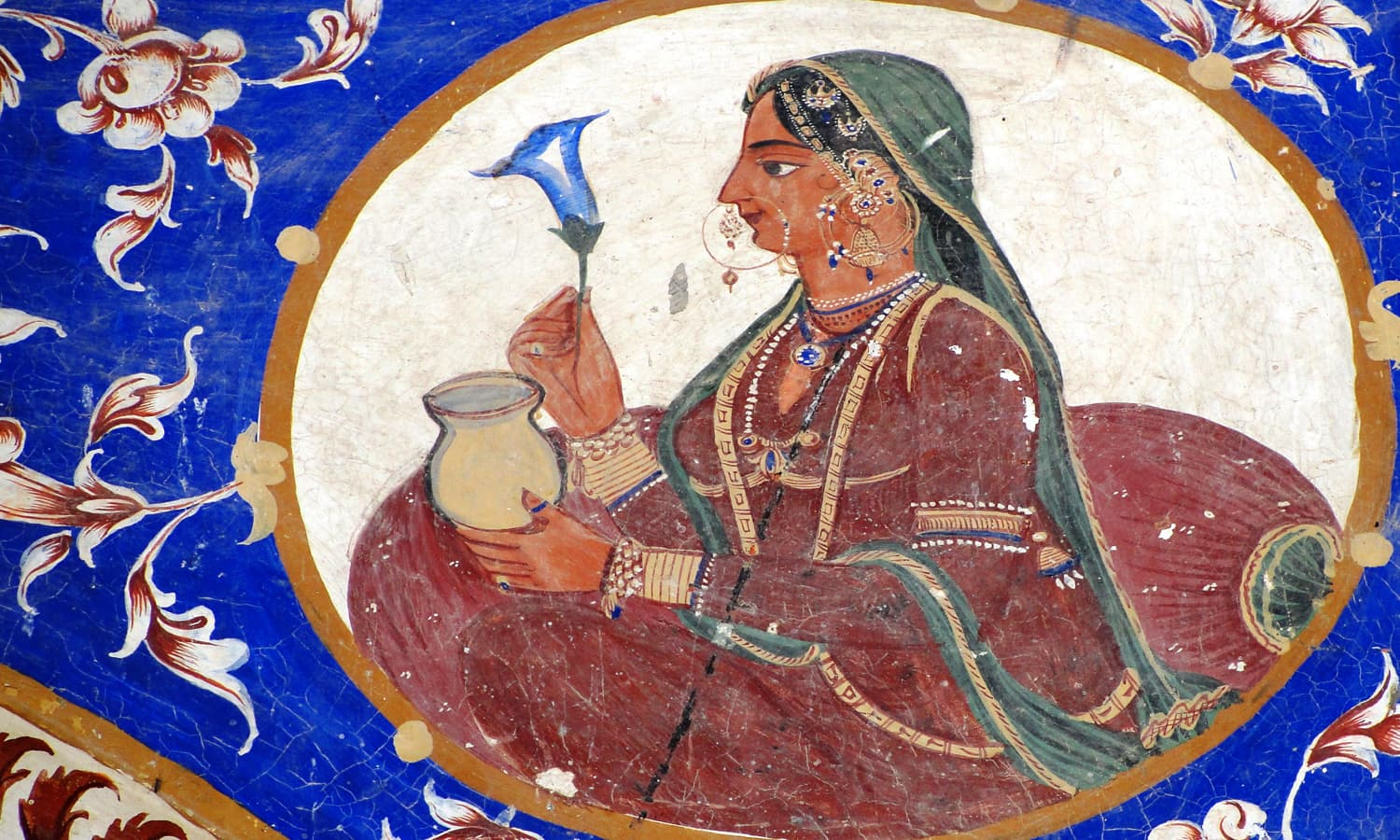
Depiction of a Sikh woman from a Haveli, c.1860s

According to Sikhism, men and women are two sides of the same human coin. There is a system of interrelationship and interdependence whereby man is born of women, and women are born of man's seed. By these doctrines a man cannot feel secure and complete in his life without a woman, and man's success is proportional to the love and support of the woman who shares her life with him (and vice versa). The founder of Sikhism, Guru Nanak, reportedly said in 1499 that "[it] is a woman who keeps the race going" and that we should not "consider woman cursed and condemned, [when] from woman are born leaders and kings."

== Status of women ==
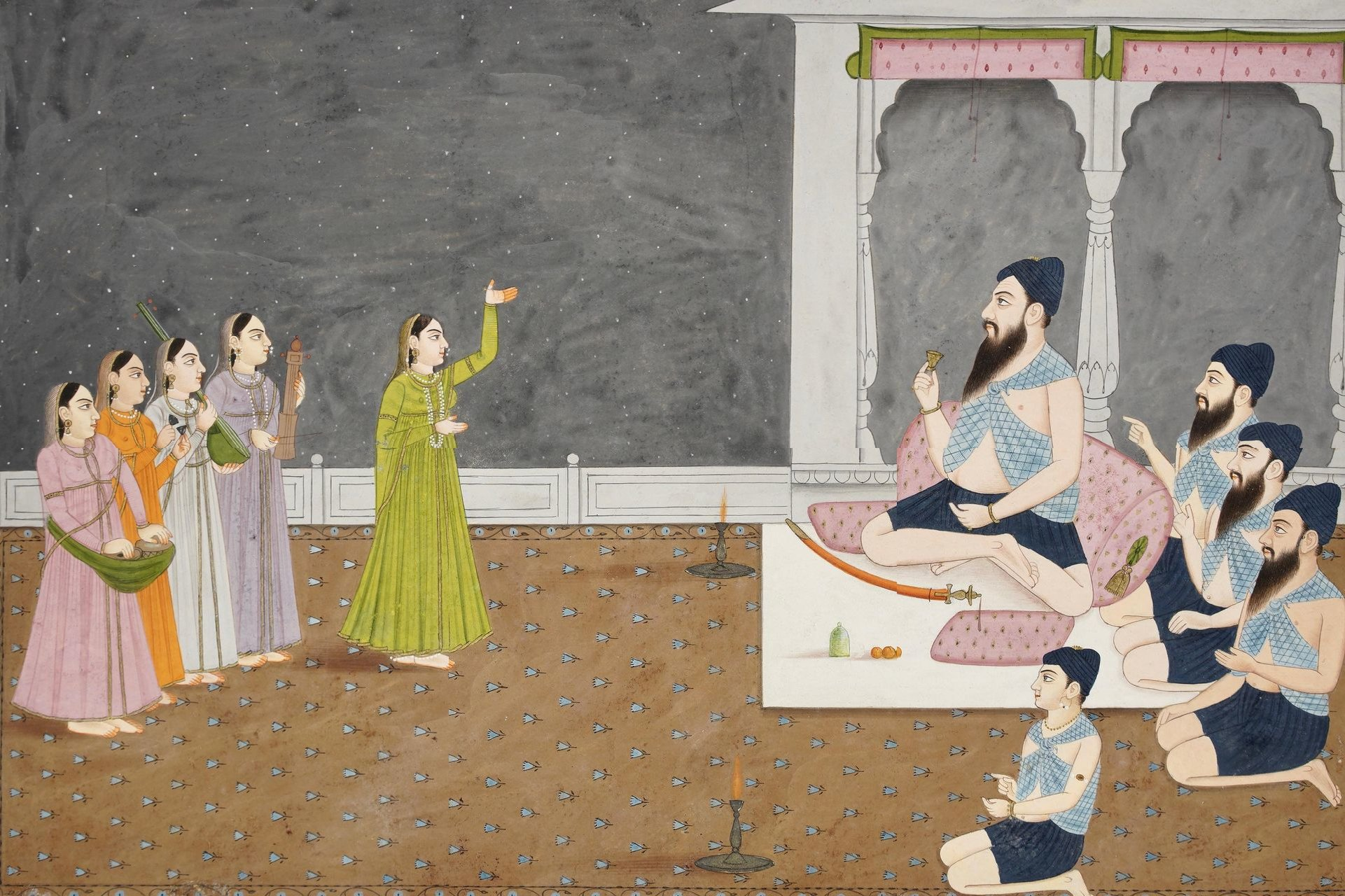
Performance of dancing and singing women at a Misl-era Sikh court

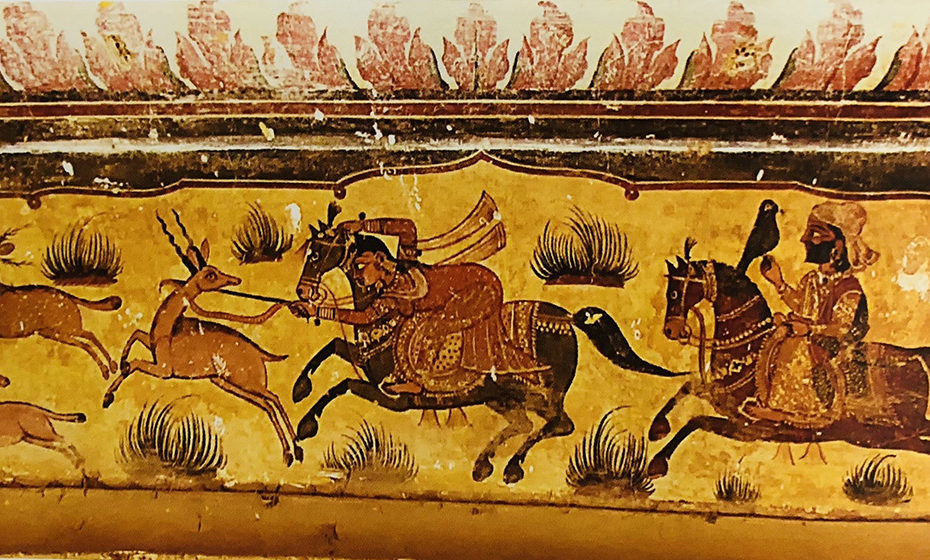
Gurdwara Bhumman Shah fresco of a woman leading a hunt

=== Current ===
In the present-day democratic politics of India, a fair amount of organizations study and work in order to rid women of many of their disadvantages. They have access to political franchise and new opportunities for advancement have opened up for them. Sikh women have shown enterprise in several fields and are among the most progressive in education and in the professions such as teaching and medicine. Within the Sikh system, they are the equals of men. They can lead congregational services and participate in akhand paths, uninterrupted readings of scripture to be accomplished within seventy-two hours. They vote with men to elect Sikhs' central religious body, the Shiromani Gurdwara Parbandhak Committee, which administers their places of worship (Gurdwara).

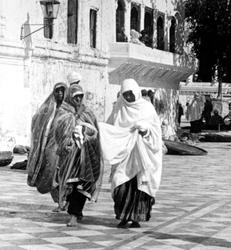
Photograph of Sikh women at Harmindar Sahib (Golden Temple complex), 1906

Sikhs are obligated to treat women as equals, and gender discrimination in Sikh society has no religious basis. However, gender equality has been difficult to achieve in practice due to heavy social, cultural, and caste-related pressure. It's worth noting that the caste system itself goes against the core principles of Sikhism.

Though equality for women has always been a major attribute of Sikhism and a great number of women have made significant contributions, it is still a work in progress. In the 1990s a group of Sikh women requested to wash the floors of the Darbar Sahib and were denied. Unlike men, women are still not allowed to assist in carrying the paliquin carrying the primary scriptures in its path to and from the Golden Temple. Also, women make up less than 20% of the SGPC members.

While diaspora women take lead in opening many aspects of ritual life for women still female participation in various religious rituals and institutions is very uncommon. Ritual services like ‘chaur seva’ wherein one uses an implement called the chaur to fan the Granth, or Sukh-aasan ritual at Harmandir Sahib ritual where the Guru Granth Sahib is shifted from the sanctum sanctorum to the Akal Takht precincts or Kirtan at golden temple, are mostly male-dominated. So also profession of Granthis to Gurudwara management are mostly male dominated fields. Part of the problem while religion officially does not hold menstruating women to be impure still patriarchy in Sikh society holds the same as taboo.

==== Kaur Project ====
Kaur Project is a project that seeks to actively create spaces for Sikh female youth to learn and lead the Hukumnama, Ardaas, Sahajpaath, Akandpaath and Parshaad seva.

== Notable Sikh women ==
- Mata Tripta, mother of Guru Nanak
- Bebe Nanaki, elder sister of Guru Nanak
- Mata Khivi, wife of Guru Angad, notable for her contributions to the establishment of Langar
- Bibi Mansa, wife of Guru Amar Das
- Mata Bhani, daughter of Guru Amar Das
- Mata Ganga, wife of Guru Arjun
- Mata Nanaki, wife of Guru Hargobind
- Mata Kaulan, disciple of Guru Hargobind
- Mata Nihal, wife of Baba Gurditta and mother of Guru Har Rai
- Mata Gujri, wife of Guru Tegh Bahadur and mother of Guru Gobind Singh
- Mata Sahib Kaur, wife of Guru Gobind Singh and subsequent leader of the Khalsa
- Mai Bhago, prominent Sikh warrior
- Mata Susheel Kaur, wife of Banda Singh Bahadur who fought alongside him
- Sada Kaur, chief of the Kanhaiya Misl from 1789 to 1821
- Maharani Datar Kaur, consort of Maharaja Ranjit Singh and mother of Maharaja Kharak Singh she served as a commander during the Battle of Multan (1818)
- Maharani Jind Kaur, wife of Ranjit Singh
- Maharani Chand Kaur, ruler of Sikh Empire
- Amrita Pritam, Punjabi novelist and poet

== See also ==
- Women in the Guru Granth Sahib
- Sikh feminism
- Women in India
- Women's rights
- Legal rights of women in history
- Kaur, the name bestowed upon Sikh girls and women by Guru Gobind Singh in 1699
