= Kotli Saru Khan =

- Village
- Location in Punjab, India Kotli Saru Khan (India)
- Coordinates: 31.469303°N 75.1201653°E
- Country: India
- State: Punjab
- District: Tarn Taran

Area
  - Total: 116 ha (290 acres)
- Elevation: 225 m (738 ft)

Population (2011)
  - Total: 917
  - Density: 791/km^{2} (2,050/sq mi)
  - Total Households: 168
- Sex ratio 444/473 ♂/♀

Languages
  - Official: Punjabi
- Time zone: UTC+5:30 (IST)
- Pin Code: 143112
- Telephone code: 01859
- ISO 3166 code: IN-PB

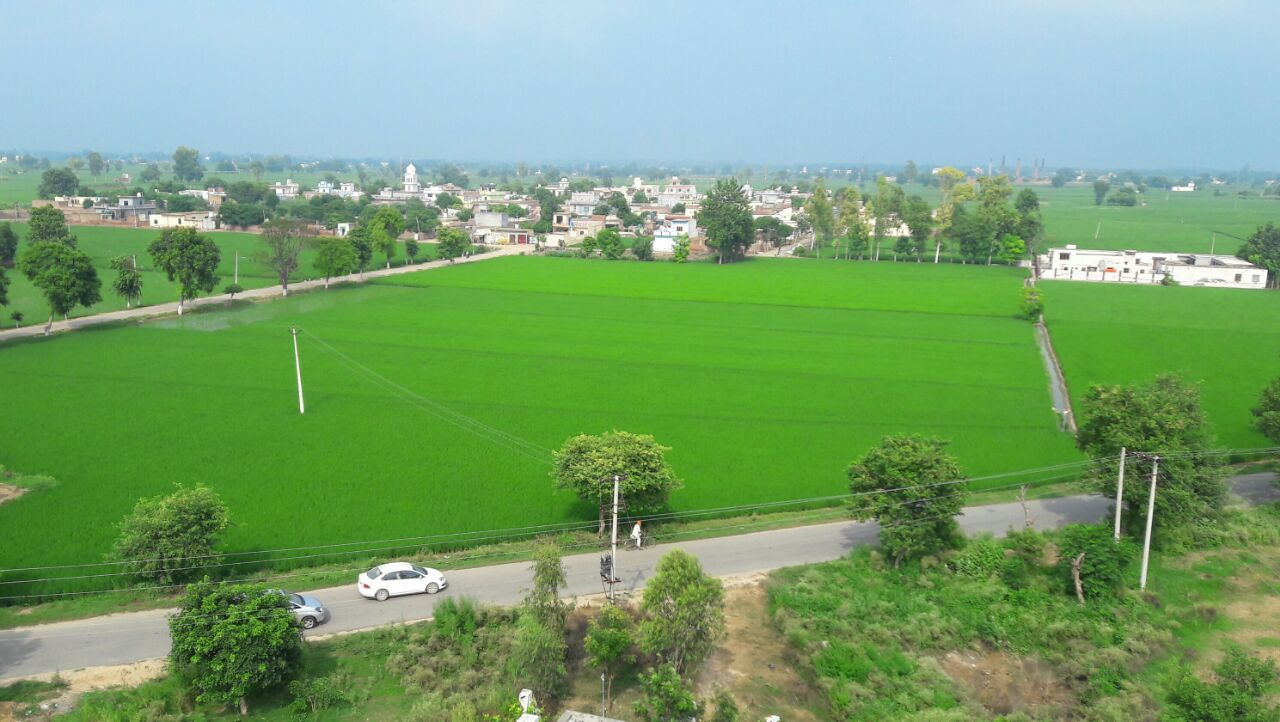
View of Kotli Saru Khan village from top of water tank at bus stand

Kotli Saru Khan is a village in Khadur Sahib in Tarn Taran district of Punjab State, India. It is located 1 kilometre (0.62 mi) from sub district headquarter and 15 kilometres (9.3 mi) from district headquarter. The village is administrated by Sarpanch an elected representative of the village.

== Population ==
According to Population Census 2015, the Kotli Saru Khan village has the population of 11200 of which 5776are males while 4324 are females with over 200 above families residing. Sex ratio of the village is quite higher than state Punjab. As per 2015 census, sex ration in the village is 1065 wherein Punjab is average of 846. Child sex ration is also very high, which is around 1170 as per census 2011. According to Census 2011 information, the location code or village code of Kotli Saru Khan village is 038309.
