= Ajit Singh Palit =

Early Sikh schismatic leader

Ajit Singh Palit (died 18 January 1725) was an early Sikh sectoral leader and adopted son of Mata Sundari, the widow of Guru Gobind Singh. He maintained himself as a pretender of guruhood for twelve years. His followers were known as the Jit Malias. (Note: His name is alternative spelt as 'Ajita' or 'Jit Singh'.)

== Early life ==
Ajit Singh was the adopted son of Mata Sundari, who adopted him from the household of a Delhite goldsmith because he bore a resemblance to her martyred son Sahibzada Ajit Singh. Ajit Singh Palit was married to a girl named Tara Bai belonging to Burhanpur. After the death of Guru Gobind Singh, Ajit Singh was recognized as the heir of the guru by Mughal emperor Bahadur Shah, who bestowed a khill'at upon Ajit Singh Palit on 30 October 1708 as a mark of condolence for his adopted father's death. While Bahadur Shah was in Punjab in 1710 to deal with Banda's rebellion, he met with Ajit Singh Palit via Chhatrasal on 26 September 1710, where Ajit Singh was given a robe of honour. However, shortly after on 27 December 1710, the emperor requested Kar-talab Khan to spy on Ajit Singh. On 1 June 1711, Ajit Singh was transferred to the camp of Sarbarah Khan. Then on 30 December 1711, the emperor conferred the jagir of Guru Chakk (Amritsar) upon Ajit Singh to counterbalance the influence of Banda Singh Bahadur while the Khalsa Sikhs were under heavy government persecution.

== Jit Malias ==
After the death of Bahadur Shah in 1712, Ajit Singh was based in Delhi and stylized himself as a guru. He became opposed to Mata Sundari, his adoptive mother, as she rebuked him and his desire to wear the weapons of Guru Gobind Singh. Eventually, Ajit Singh was disowned by Mata Sundari after he threatened her and she went to live with his wife Tara Bai and their son Hathi Singh in Mathura. Ajit Singh acquired a following of his own, with his dera's darbar being housed at Delhi. However, his followers supposedly mocked a group of Muslims in prayer and thus Ajit Singh begged for forgiveness in the Mughal court, who ordered him to shave his hair or be punished, which he had acquiesced to, causing him to lose much prestige with the Sikhs in Delhi. One day, his followers murdered a Muslim fakir, thus the Mughal administration sacked his dera and Ajit Singh went into hiding at the home of a Kalal. However, Ajit Singh was betrayed by the Kalal and was legally prosecuted by the Mughals under emperor Muhammad Shah. He was sentenced to execution and died on 18 January 1725 by being dragged by an elephant in Delhi. Ajit Singh was cremated in the Sabzi Mandi locality of Delhi and a shrine there was erected in his memory. After Ajit Singh died, he was succeeded by his son Hathi Singh as leader of the Jit Malias.

Hathi Singh after he grew older also became opposed to Mata Sundari. Hathi Singh began plagiarizing Sikh hymns by writing his name instead where Nanak's name occurred in the passages. Due to this, Sundari left the company of Hathi Singh and moved back to Delhi. Hathi Singh was based in Mathura but shifted to Burhanpur in Madhya Pradesh after the Durranis attacked Mathura in 1757, where he had a sangat of his own following. Hathi Singh died without a successor in Burhanpur in 1783. A samadh shrine dedicated to Hathi Singh can be found near Gurdwara Bari Sangat in Burhanpur.

There is a Bakhshishan sect amongst the Udasis also known as Jit Malieh.
