= Mata Jito =

Wife of Guru Gobind Singh

Mata Jito Ji
- ਮਾਤਾ ਜੀਤੋ
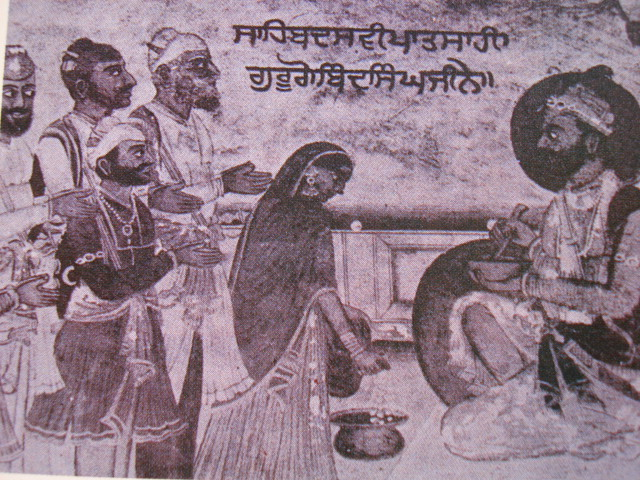
- Detail of Mata Jito appending sugar crystals to Amrit during Vaisakhi 1699 from a fresco that was located in the original Akal Takht building
- Pronunciation: mātā jītō
- Born: Ajeet Subhikkhi; 1670; Lahore
- Died: 5 December 1700; Anandpur Sahib
- Monuments: Gurdwara Mata Jito Ji, Anandpur Sahib
- Other names: Jeeto
- Spouse: Guru Gobind Singh
- Children: Ajit Singh (step-son); Jujhar Singh; Zorawar Singh; Fateh Singh
- Parent(s): Harjas Subhikkhi; Mata Sabhrai

Mātā Jīto (1670 – 5 December 1700, Gurmukhi: ਮਾਤਾ ਜੀਤੋ, Shahmukhi: ماتا جیتو), or Ajeet Kaur, was a wife of Guru Gobind Singh.

== Biography ==
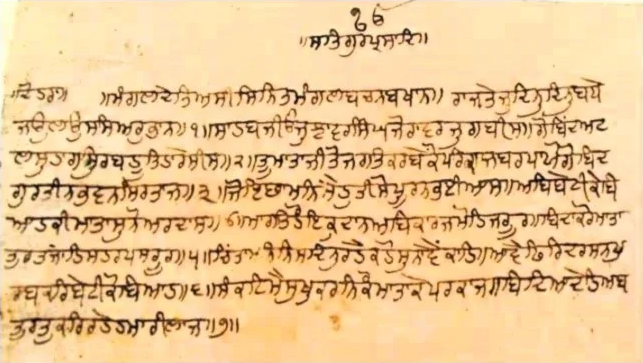
Poem attributed to the court-poet Kavi Mangal, addressed to Mata Jito, wife of Guru Gobind Singh, ca.1695–1696

She was the first wife of the tenth Sikh Guru, Guru Gobind Singh. The couple married on 21 June 1677 and had three children together. The initial marriage ceremony between Mata Jito and Guru Gobind Singh took place when she was seven years old and he was eleven. Due to the dangers associated with traveling to Lahore—her hometown—just two years after the execution of Guru Tegh Bahadur, Guru Gobind Singh established a new settlement called Guru Ka Lahore. This village, situated approximately 12 kilometers northeast of Anandpur, became the site of their wedding in 1677. The muklawa, a traditional ceremony marking the completion of the marriage, was held in late 1688, after Mata Jito had reached puberty, following Guru Gobind Singh's return from Paonta Sahib to Anandpur.

Mata Jito was the mother of Jujhar Singh, Zorawar Singh and Fateh Singh but was not the biological mother of Ajit Singh, who was the son of Mata Sundari.

== Presence during Amrit Sanchaar ==
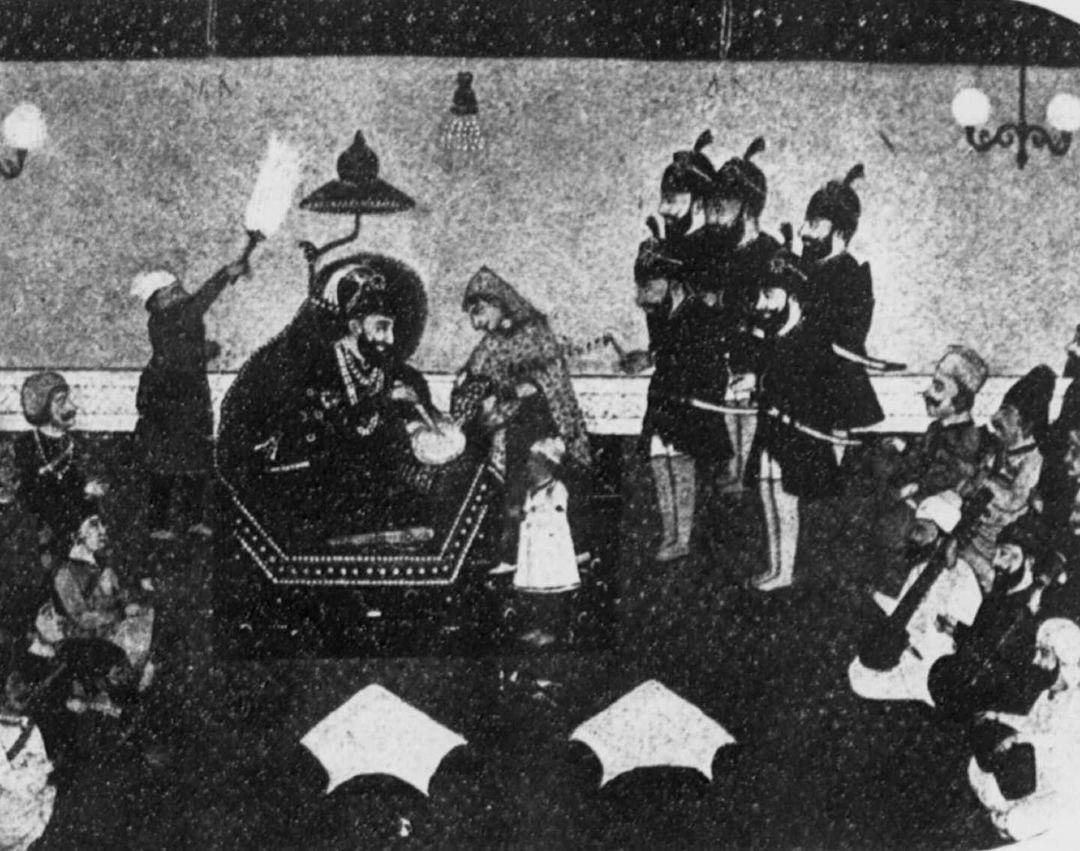
Painting of the establishment of the Khalsa order and Panj Piare institution by Guru Gobind Singh and Mata Jito at Anandpur in 1699, circa 19th century

There are different views among Sikh historians on her presence during this event. According to Bhai Kahn Singh Nabha in the Mahan Kosh, Mata Sahib Devan was present during the creation of Khalsa Panth and participated in making Pahul by adding sugar wafers but the Twarikh Guru Khalsa refutes this claim. The Twarikh states that Guru Gobind Singh's first wife, Mata Jito, put sugar wafers in the Pahul and that Mata Sahib Devan was not married to Guru Gobind Singh at that time. According to Kanwarjit Singh Kang, a fresco that was located in the original Akal Takht depicting a woman appending sugar crystals to Amrit during the Vaisakhi events of 1699 depicts Mata Jito, not Mata Sahib Devan.

== See also ==
- Mata Sundari
- Mata Sahib Kaur
- Women in Sikhism
