= Khivi =

Wife of Sikh guru Angad

Mata/ Bibi Khivi
- ਮਾਤਾ ਖੀਵੀ
- Painting of Khivi cooking to prepare langar

Personal life
- Born: Khivi Marwaha; 1506 Sangar Kot
- Died: 1586 (aged 79–80)
- Spouse: Guru Angad
- Children: 4
- Parents: Devi Chand (father); Karan Devi (mother)

Religious life
- Religion: Sikhism

Khivi (Punjabi: ਮਾਤਾ ਖੀਵੀ) (1506–1582) also referred to as Mata Khivi or Bibi Khivi was the wife of the second Sikh guru Angad, best known for establishing the Sikh tradition of langar (free kitchen).

== Early life ==
Khivi was born in 1506 or 1507 into a Marwaha Khatri family to Devi Chand and Karan Devi in village Sangar Kot near Khadur Sahib. (Note: Her date of birth is deduced based upon her husband's known birth year due to Khatri marriage customs at that time where the bride was usually three to four years younger than the groom.) Devi Chand was a wholesale businessman and money lender at Sangar village. (Note: The name of the village is alternatively spelt as 'Sanghar'.)

== Marriage ==
Khivi was married to Lehna, a resident of Khadoor Sahib in 1519 at the age of 13, who went on to become second guru of Sikhs and was named Guru Angad. The marriage had been arranged by Virai Devi, the daughter of Chaudhary Takhtmal with both being staunch followers of Guru Nanak.

After the marriage was solemnized, the family shifted from Lehna's ancestral village to Sangar village in the family compound as per the proposal of Devi Chand, father of Khivi. Lehna's father, Bhai Pheru, started a shop in the village of Hari Ke Pattan but the store did not thrive due to hardships. (Note: Bhai Lehna's father's name is alternatively spelt as 'Feru'.) Thus, Pheru moved back to Khadur and restarted his money lending business. When Pheru died in 1526, Lehna took-over his money-lending business. On the instigation of Khivi, the family moved back to Khadur.

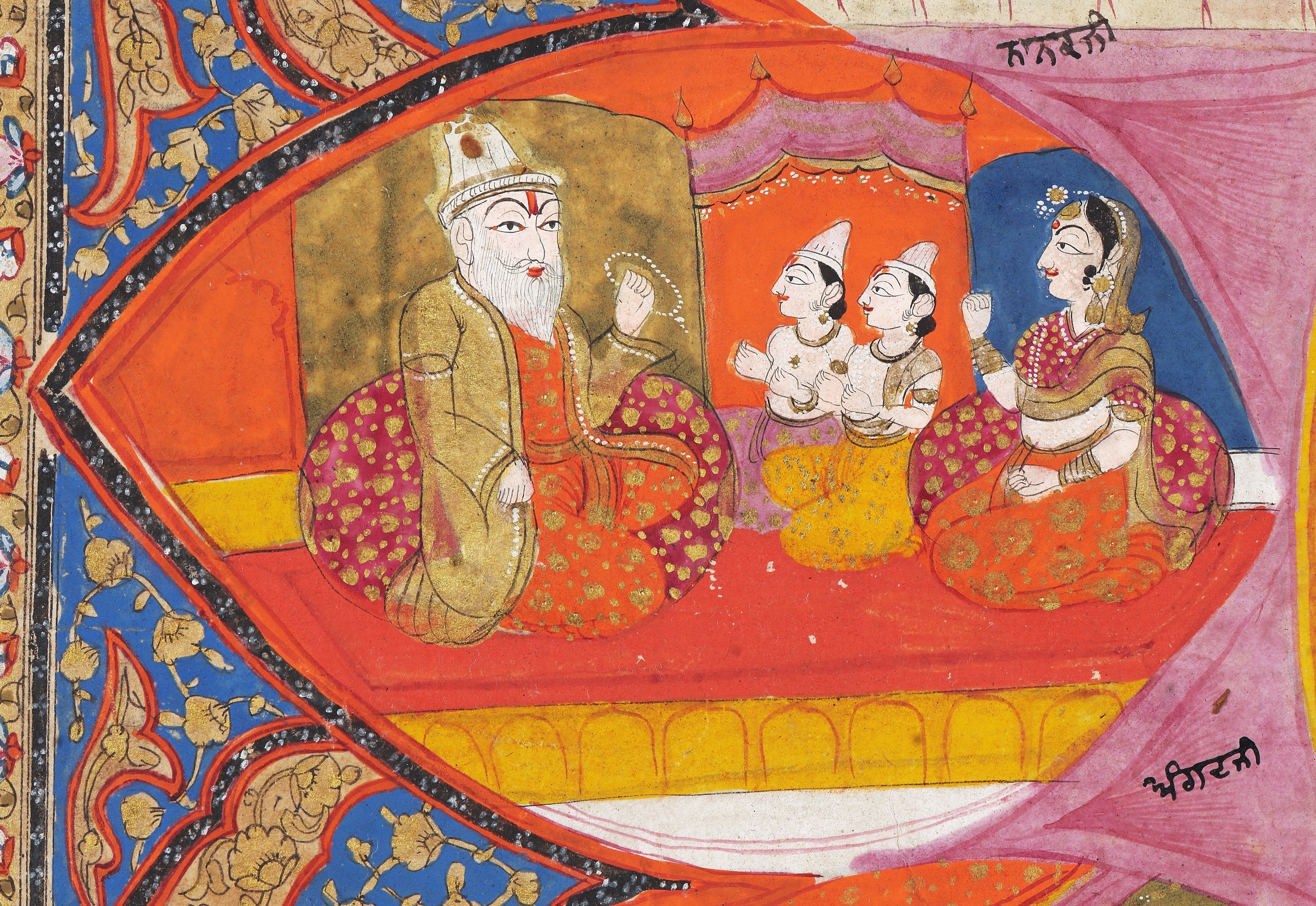
Guru Angad, Mata Khivi, Baba Dasu, and Baba Dattu. Daughters Bibi Amro and Bibi Anokhi are missing. From an illustrated and illuminated folio of a Dasam Granth manuscript by Miha Singh of Kashmir, ca.1839–1843

The couple had four children; two sons Datu and Dasu and two daughters Anokhi and Amro. Dasu was the elder son of Khivi and Lehna. According to some sources, the couple only had three children (omitting Anokhi). Khivi lived for 30 years after her husband's death to the age of 75.

== Langar service ==
After Guru Nanak's initiation, Khivi continued the system of langar or free kitchen and administered it. It was popularly known as Mata Khivi ji da Langar (Mother Khivi's langar) and she was monumental in institutionalising the Sikh tradition of langar. She was also instrumental in making the Sewa (service) tradition in gurdwaras. She was the founder of the Pangat tradition, where people sit in systematic rows during meals.

Khivi has a unique feat of being mentioned by name in the Guru Granth Sahib in a verse by Balwand:

Balwand says that Khivi, the Guru's wife, is a noble woman, who gives soothing, leafy shade to all. Today, Gurdwaras serve millions of people every day and serve as her legacy. She gave the message of equality which makes all the children of God entitled to food.

— Balvand Rai, Guru Granth Sahib, page 967

== Legacy ==
A large relief work at the Baba Baghel Singh Sikh Heritage Multimedia Museum in New Delhi commemorates Mata Khivi and her service in the Langar and Pangat traditions.

== See also ==
- Langar
