= Mata Sahib Devan =

Wife of Guru Gobind Singh

Mata Mata Sahib Devan Ji
- ਮਾਤਾ ਸਾਹਿਬ ਕੌਰ
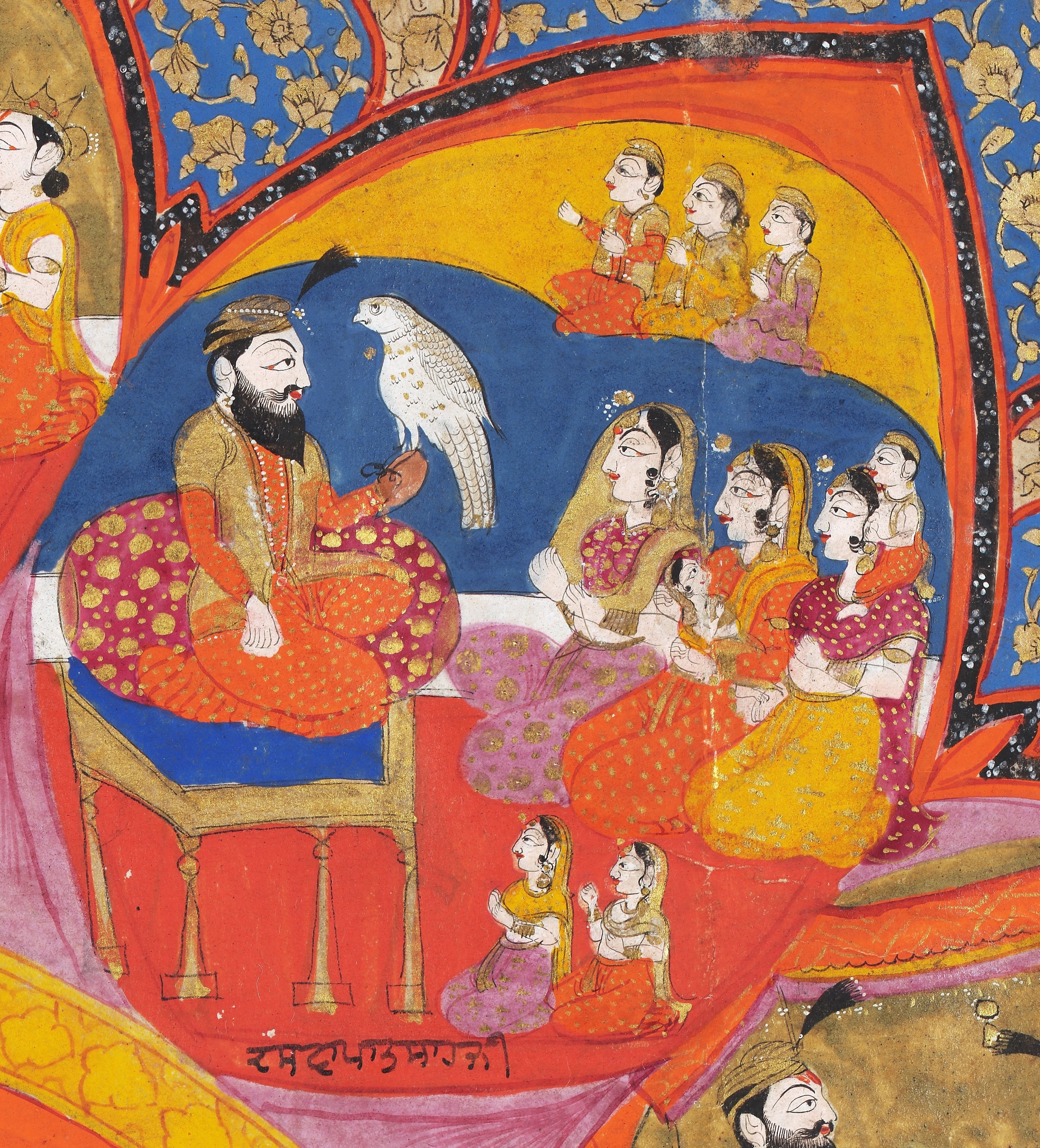
- Depiction of Guru Gobind Singh with his three wives (including Mata Sahib Devan; seated left-most in the group of three) and children from a manuscript by Miha Singh of Kashmir dated to between 1839–1843.

Personal life
- Born: Sahib Devan Bassi; 1 November 1681 mātā sāhiba dīvāna Rohtas, Jhelum, Punjab, Mughal Empire (present-day Punjab, Pakistan)
- Died: 1747 (aged 65–66) Delhi, Mughal Empire (present-day India)
- Spouse: Guru Gobind Singh
- Parents: Har Bhagwan Devan Bassi (father); Mata Jasdevi (mother)
- Other name: Sahib Devi

Religious life
- Religion: Sikhism

Mata Sahib Kaur (born Mata Sahib Devan, 1 November 1681 – 1747, Punjabi: ਮਾਤਾ ਸਾਹਿਬ ਦੇਵਾਂ), also known as Mata Sahib Devi, was a wife of Guru Gobind Singh.

== Early life ==
She was the daughter of Har Bhagwan Devan (alias Ramu), a Bassi Khatri of Rohtas, Jhelum District. Mata Sahib Devan was born on 1 November 1681 at Rohtas. She was offered to be a bride of Guru Gobind Singh by her father Bhai Rama, a devout Nanak Naam Leva Sikh, and the nuptials took place on 15 April 1700 at Anandpur. In her childhood she was called Sahib Devi by her parents.

== Biography ==
When the proposal was brought for discussion to Anandpur, the Guru at first refused, as he was married already and had four sons. The Sangat and the Guru's family agreed to the marriage, but Guru Gobind Singh, the tenth Guru made it clear that his relationship with Mata Sahib Devan would be of a spiritual nature and not physical.

The Guru proclaimed her to be the Mother of the Khalsa and since then novitiates have been declared to be the sons and daughters of Guru Gobind Singh and Mātā Sāhib Devāṅ.

In 1704, when the family of Guru Gobind Singh was forced to break up during the Battle of Sarsa, Mata Sundari and Mata Sahib Kaur dressed like ordinary village women and headed toward Ambala, hoping to find shelter, Nand Lal escorted them to Delhi using his good connections with powerful nobles, he protected them from Wazir Khan, the Mughal governor of Sirhind.

Mata Sahib Devan died in 1747 at the age of 66 and was cremated at Gurdwara Bala Sahib, New Delhi. Her memorial stands close to the one commemorating Mata Sundari.

== Presence during Amrit Sanchaar ==
There are different views among Sikh historians on her presence during this event. According to Bhai Kahn Singh Nabha in the Mahan Kosh, Mata Sahib Devan was present during the creation of Khalsa Panth and participated in making Pahul by adding sugar wafers but the Twarikh Guru Khalsa refutes this claim. The Twarikh states that Guru Gobind Singh's first wife, Mata Jito, put sugar wafers in the Pahul and that Mata Sahib Devan was not married to Guru Gobind Singh at that time.

== Role in the Khalsa Panth ==
She is mother of whole Khalsa Panth, when a Sikh becomes amritdhari (baptized), Guru Gobind Singh is their father and Mata Sahib Devan is their mother.

== In popular culture ==
Supreme Motherhood: The Journey of Mata Sahib Kaur, a 2022 animated film by Nihal Nihal Nihal Productions and Zee Studios, depicts the life of Mata Sahib Kaur, from a young girl to becoming the "Mother of the Khalsa".

== See also ==
- Mata Jito
- Mata Sundari
- Women in Sikhism
