= Sarai Naga =

Village in Punjab, India

Coordinates: 30.5141°N 74.6711°E

Sarai Naga is a historical village on state highway 16 in b/w Kotkapura, Muktsar, Punjab, India. It is the birthplace of 2nd guru of Sikhs, Guru Angad. This village was earlier known as Matte-di-Sarai.
