= Mata Kaulan =

Mata Kaulan (Punjabi: ਮਾਤਾ ਕੌਲਾਂ), also referred to as Bibi Kaulan (Punjabi: ਬੀਬੀ ਕੌਲਾਂ), is believed to be a spiritual woman who lived during time of Guru Hargobind Sahib, the 6th Sikh Guru. Kaulan means the one who is Living in abode of Lotus.

There is dispute among historians regarding Kaulan and her relation to Guru Hargobind. Some scholars believed her to have been the wife of Hargobind, where others believe that she was his servant. Scholars commonly hold the viewpoint that she was a true disciple of Guru Hargobind and spent her life under the directions of the Guru, meditating and singing Guru Nanak's bani.

== See also ==
- Women in Sikhism
