= List of things named after Guru Angad =

A number of places are named after the second guru of Sikhs, Guru Angad Dev ji.

- Guru Angad Dev Veterinary and Animal Sciences University, Ludhiana, India
- Guru Angad Dev Charitable Hospital, Ludhiana, India
- Shri Guru Angad Dev College, Khadoor Sahib, India
- Guru Angad Dev Ji International Gurumat Sangeet Academy, Ludhiana, India
- Guru Angad Dev Educational and welfare society, Ludhiana, India
- Guru Angad Dev College of Nursing, Ludhiana, India
