= Women in the Guru Granth Sahib =

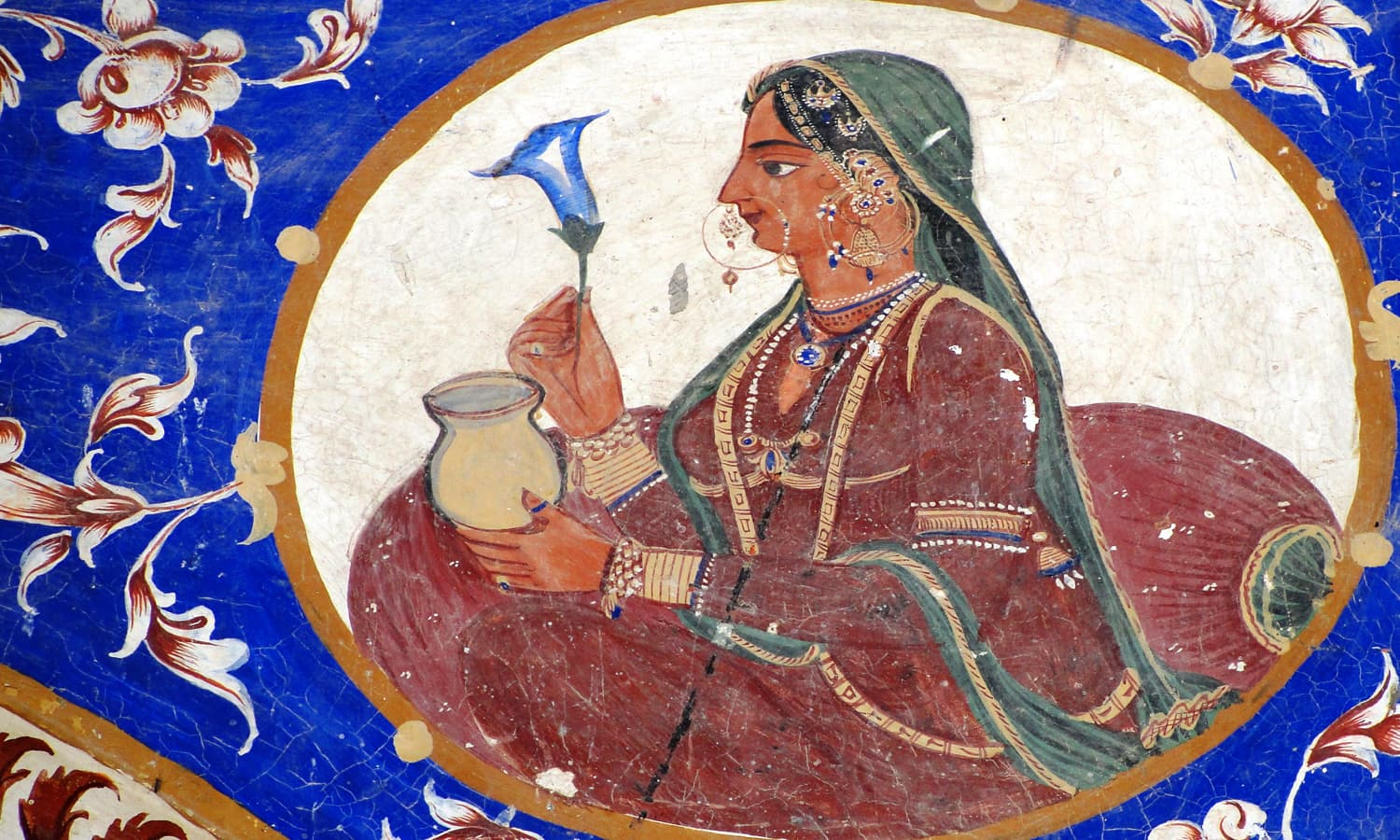
19th century depiction of a Sikh woman from a Haveli

The Guru Granth Sahib is the holy text of Sikhs. Several of the shabads (hymns) from the Guru Granth Sahib address the role of women in Indian and Sikh society.

== Shabads from the Guru Granth Sahib ==
=== From woman, man is born ===
In this Shabad, the Guru expresses the importance of women. It begins with the line "From a woman, a man is born" to emphasise that all men and women come from a woman. This theme then continues with the Guru highlighting, in a logical sequence, the various stages of life where the importance of woman is noted – "within woman, man is conceived," and then, " he is engaged and married" to a woman who becomes his friend, partner, and the source for future generations. This Shabad shows that, throughout man's life, he is dependent on woman at every critical stage.

The Shabad continues, "When his woman dies, he seeks another woman" – so if his wife dies, a man feels the compulsion to find another women still. In the final lines, the Guru asks: "So why call her bad?" – when even kings are born from a female mother as are other women themselves. The Guru then conclude that "without woman – there would be no one at all". This leaves no doubt for the Guru that the female gender plays a critical part in every aspect of a man's life, someone who is there in one shape or form throughout life and also is critical for the survival of the human race and the very existence of humans to begin with. In this Shabad, the Guru outlines the importance, magnitude, and value of women, in very simple terms, and shows what a significant role they play in propagation of the species as well as multiple other roles. This Shabad is mainly aimed at the culture of that time which consistently put women as below men, as such this type of thinking was to encourage the men of those times to view women more equally. However, this hymn remains pertinent today due to the subjugation of women in many cultures.

From woman, man is born;

within woman, man is conceived; to woman he is engaged and married.
Woman becomes his friend; through woman, the future generations come.
When his woman dies, he seeks another woman; to woman he is bound.
So why call her bad? From her, kings are born.
From woman, woman is born; without woman, there would be no one at all.

— Guru Nanak, Raag Aasaa Mehal 1, Ang 473

Bhai Gurdas Vaaran is also recommended to Sikhs by Gurus. Some part of these vāran state as follows:

"At birth a Sikh girl is immediately “our darling” to her mother and father. Later, she becomes admired by her brothers and sisters and favored by her relatives. On attaining “the bloom of youth,” she is married, with costly gifts and presents. Now, respected by her husband's family, and deemed lucky in her new household, she is regarded as the equal of her spouse in both virtue and wisdom. She becomes as a doorway to salvation. Such is the verbal portrait of a Guru-inspired, and blessed, faithful Sikh woman." (5.16)

=== Shabad against Sati ===
Sati is an Indian custom of immolation of a woman on her dead husband's funeral pyre either willingly or by societal inducement and compulsion. Guru Nanak said the following about this practice:

Do not call them 'satee', who burn themselves along with their husbands' corpses.
O Nanak, they alone are known as 'satee', who die from the shock of separation. (1)
…Some burn themselves along with their dead husbands: [but they need not, for] if they really loved them they would endure the pain alive.

— Sri Guru Granth Sahib page 787

The Guru said that if the wife really loves her husband, then she should endure the pain of separation alive; that she should rather continue living her life than suffer a quick death in the fire of her husband's funeral pyre. Further, Guru Nanak explains that a true "Sati" is the person who cannot endure the pain of separation from their loved one.

=== Shabad against dowry ===
The Sikh Gurus spoke against the common practice of dowry when a gift of money or valuables had to be given by the bride's family to that of the groom at the time of their marriage. Huge pressure was exerted on the bride's family for the extraction of a sizable fortune at times of marriage. It has historically been regarded as a contribution by her family to the married household's future expenses. The Gurus called this giving of gifts an "offer for show" of the guests, and a "worthless display" which only increased "false egotism." Sikh families were discouraged from continuing this practice, and slowly this trend has diminished in some parts of Indian society. The following Shabad explains the Guru's position:

Any other dowry, which the self-willed manmukhs offer for show, is only false egotism and a worthless display.
O my father, please give me the Name of the Lord God as my wedding gift and dowry. (4)

— Sri Guru Granth Sahib page 79

== See also ==
- Women in India
- Women in Sikhism
- Women's rights
