= Mata Sundari =

Wife of Guru Gobind Singh

Mata Sundari Ji
- ਮਾਤਾ ਸੁੰਦਰੀ

Personal life
- Died: 1747
- Spouse: Guru Gobind Singh
- Children: Ajit Singh (son); Jujhar Singh (step-son); Zorawar Singh (step-son); Fateh Singh (step-son); Ajit Singh Palit (adopted son)
- Parent(s): Ram Saran, a Khatri of Bajwara
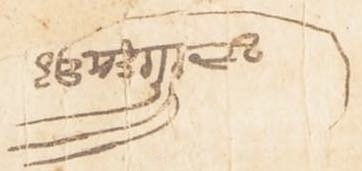
- Signature

Religious life
- Religion: Sikhism

Mātā Sundarī (died 1747, Punjabi: ਮਾਤਾ ਸੁੰਦਰੀ) was a wife of Guru Gobind Singh. She led the Sikh community after the death of her husband.

== Biography ==
She was the daughter of Ram Sarana, a Punjabi Soni Kumarāv Khatri of Bijwara Soni - in present-day Hoshiārpur district.In 1673 Sundari married Guru Gobind Singh. In 1688 she gave birth to Ajit Singh. In 1704, when the family of Guru Gobind Singh was forced to break up during the Battle of Sarsa, Mata Sundari and Mata Sahib Kaur dressed like ordinary village women and headed toward Ambala, hoping to find shelter, Nand Lal escorted them to Delhi using his good connections with powerful nobles, he protected them from Wazir Khan, the Mughal governor of Sirhind.

On 23 July, 1707, Mughal emperor Bahadur Shah met with Gobind Singh in order to engage in negotiations. The Guru was honored with gifts and Bahadur Shah sent one lakh rupees worth of jewelry, clothes, and ornaments to Sundari in Delhi.

Mata Sundari adopted a boy and named him after her late son, Ajit Singh. Later, he killed a Muslim beggar who had been receiving his generous alms every day. When the beggar persistently demanded an even greater gift, the situation became difficult, and Ajit Singh ended his life. He was arrested, tied to the tail of an elephant, and dragged through the streets of Delhi. At one sharp turn, the enraged elephant stepped on his head and crushed it. Mata Sundari then fled to Mathura, where the Raja of Jaipur gave her a new home and a handsome allowance. Meanwhile, her house and property in Delhi were seized by the Muslims.

== Conflict with Banda Singh Bahadur ==
In 1714, a resolute effort was envisaged by Farrukhsiyar to suppress Banda's rebellion, as he was evading capture despite significant Mughal endeavors and resource investments. Initially, Mata Sundari was asked to persuade Banda Singh Bahadur to cease his lawlessness and his expedition against the Mughals in exchange for jagirs and the recruitment of Sikh soldiers into the imperial army. However, Banda Singh Bahadur declined due to his lack of trust in the government. The Emperor then imprisoned both of Guru Gobind Singh's widows, prompting Mata Sundari to write to Banda Singh Bahadur again, urging him to submit. Banda Singh Bahadur again declined, leading the Emperor to tighten restrictions on the widows, which culminated in the excommunication of Banda Singh Bahadur by Mata Sundari for refusing to submit to the Emperor as per her demands. She further accused him of assuming the role of "Guru" over the Sikhs and reprimanded his followers in a hukam-nama. This dispute led to the formation of two separate factions within the contemporary Sikh community: the Tat Khalsa, who were allied with Mata Sundari, and the Bandais, who were allied with Banda Singh Bahadur.

Mata Sundari's intervention led to approximately fifteen thousand of Banda's followers abandoning him prior to the Siege of Gurdas Nangal.

Disputes between the Tat Khalsa and the Bandais primarily included issues such as Banda's abandonment of the traditional blue robes in favor of red ones, his insistence on vegetarianism, his observance of caste rituals, and his replacement of the prescribed Sikh slogan with "Fateh Darshan." There were also concerns over the excesses committed by Banda's troops during their campaign of retribution against the Mughals. Banda's excommunication impeded his ability to counter the Mughals and contributed to his eventual capture and execution.

Modern Sikh tradition speaks of at least two different Khalsas: the Tat Khalsa—which adheres to the polity and injunctions of Guru Gobind Singh—and the Bandais, who adopted the principles of Banda Singh Bahadur.

However, the authenticity of the excommunication of Banda Singh Bahadur by Mata Sundari has been questioned by historian Ganda Singh, who notes that there are no contemporary or near-contemporary writers or sources that mention Banda Singh Bahadur being excommunicated or that Farrukh Siyar had entered into negotiations with Mata Sundari. Historian Surjit Singh Gandhi also claims that there are no contemporary sources that mention any excommunication occurring between Banda Singh and Mata Sundari. Historian Sukhdial Singh further notes that there is no hukam-nama issued by Mata Sundari addressing Banda Singh. According to Dr. Nazer Singh, Banda Singh was regarded with contempt by the Akalis and the larger Sikh community for two centuries after his death. To counter Banda's exclusion from the Sikh community, Dr. Ganda Singh wrote an exculpatory book on him in 1935, proclaiming him to be a "perfect Sikh". However, although Ganda Singh defends Banda Singh from the various allegations leveled against him, he does acknowledge that Banda Singh was not beyond criticism nor was he infallible. Purnima Dhavan has also cast doubt on Ganda Singh's explication of Banda Singh Bahadur's life and adherence to the Khalsa doctrine; his citing of Banda's phrases in hukam-namas, which he interpreted as Banda deferring to the Guru's authority and strictures ("This is the order of the Sacha Sahiba" and "He who lives according to the Rehat of the Khalsa shall be saved by the Guru"), was equivocal and could also be taken as Banda conferring guruship upon himself. However, Hari Ram Gupta notes that the term "Sri Sacha Sahiba" found in Banda Singh's writings was used only to refer to God and the Guru, and not to himself. Ganda Singh also concurred that Banda invented his own salutation and prohibited the consumption of meat, likely motivated by his Bairagi background as opposed to the customs of the Khalsa. Harbans Sagoo notes that although Banda Singh introduced the slogan "Fateh Darshan", he never intended it to replace the traditional Sikh salutation "Waheguru Ji Ki Ka Khalsa, Waheguru Ji Ki Fateh." When the Khalsa rejected "Fateh Darshan" as a slogan, Banda Singh agreed to abandon it. Sukhdial Singh claims that the slogan was not "Fateh Darshan" but rather "Fateh Darshani," meaning a fateh uttered after a darshan. Sukhdial Singh argues that the slogan alone would not have warranted any form of punishment. According to Purnima Dhavan, while Banda did reiterate his support for the Khalsa rahit in his hukam-namas, he also revered the values of vegetarianism and customs associated with the Hindu elite, made appeals to a collective Hindu and Sikh religion, and omitted earlier orthodox Sikh sentiments and apprehensions about the Khalsa's interactions with other groups.

== Legacy ==
She holds a special place in Sikhism for the role she played in leading Sikhs after the ascension of Guru Gobind Singh. A memorial in her honour stands in the compound of Gurdwara Bala Sahib, New Delhi.

Mata Sundri College for Women located in Central Delhi is named after her.

== Gallery ==
A hukamnama (historically refers to issued edicts, injunctions, or orders by the Sikh gurus and their officiated followers and associates) issued by Mata Sundari (wife and widow of Guru Gobind Singh) from the Bhai Rupa Collection

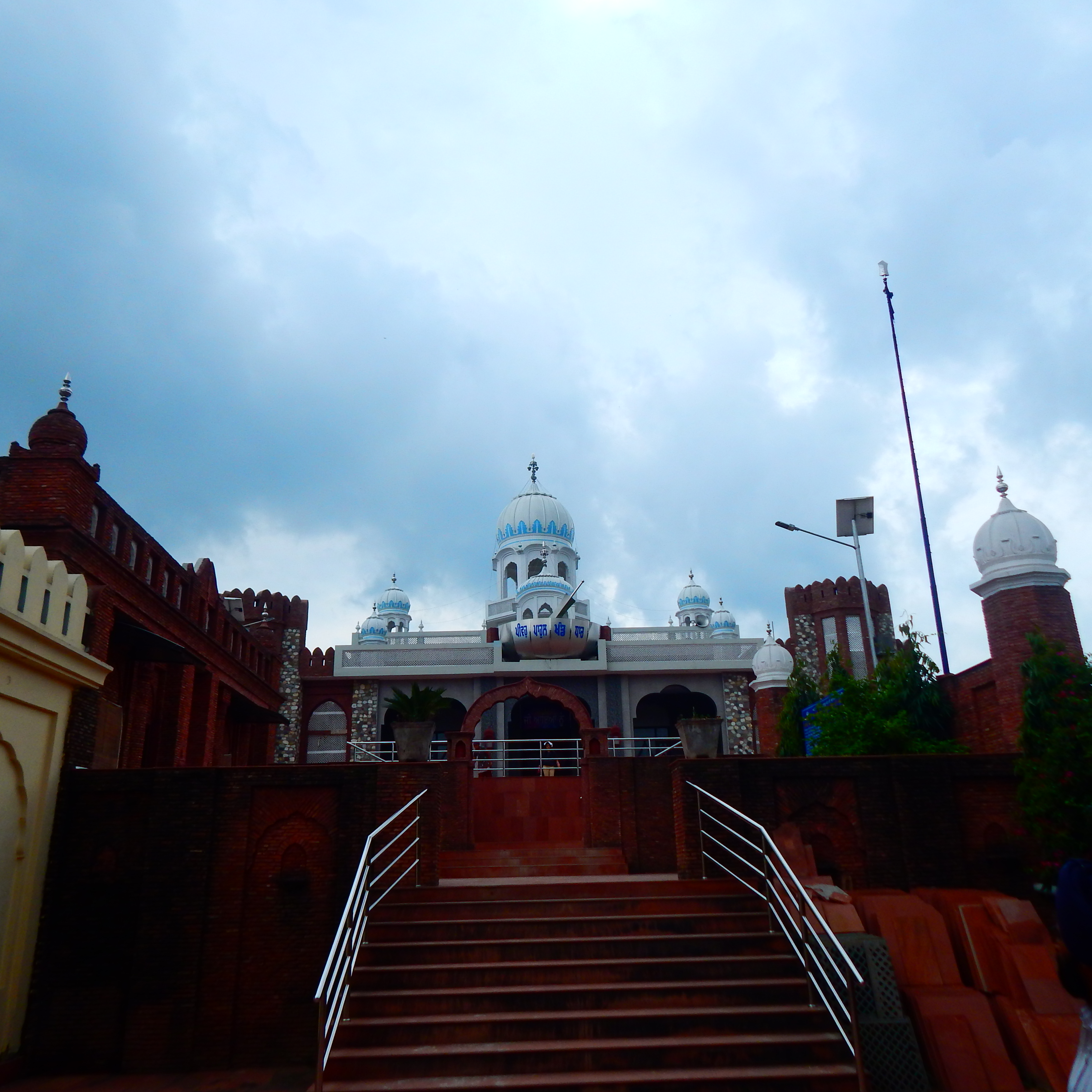
Birthplace of Mata Sundari

== See also ==
- Mata Jito
- Mata Sahib Kaur
- Women in Sikhism

== Sources ==
- Dhavan, Purnima (2011-11-03). When Sparrows Became Hawks: The Making of the Sikh Warrior Tradition, 1699-1799. Oxford University Press, USA. ISBN 978-0-19-975655-1.
- Gandhi, Surjit Singh (1999). Sikhs In The Eighteenth Century. Singh Bros. ISBN 9788172052171.
- Sagoo, Harbans Kaur (2001). Banda Singh Bahadur and Sikh Sovereignty. Deep & Deep Publications. ISBN 9788176293006.
- Singh, Ganda (1990) [1935]. Life of Banda Singh Bahadur. Publication Bureau, Punjabi University.
- Singh, Pashaura; Fenech, Louis E. (2014). The Oxford Handbook of Sikh Studies. Oxford University Press. ISBN 978-0-19-969930-8.
