= Guru Angad =

Second Sikh guru from 1539 to 1552

- ਗੁਰੂ ਅੰਗਦ
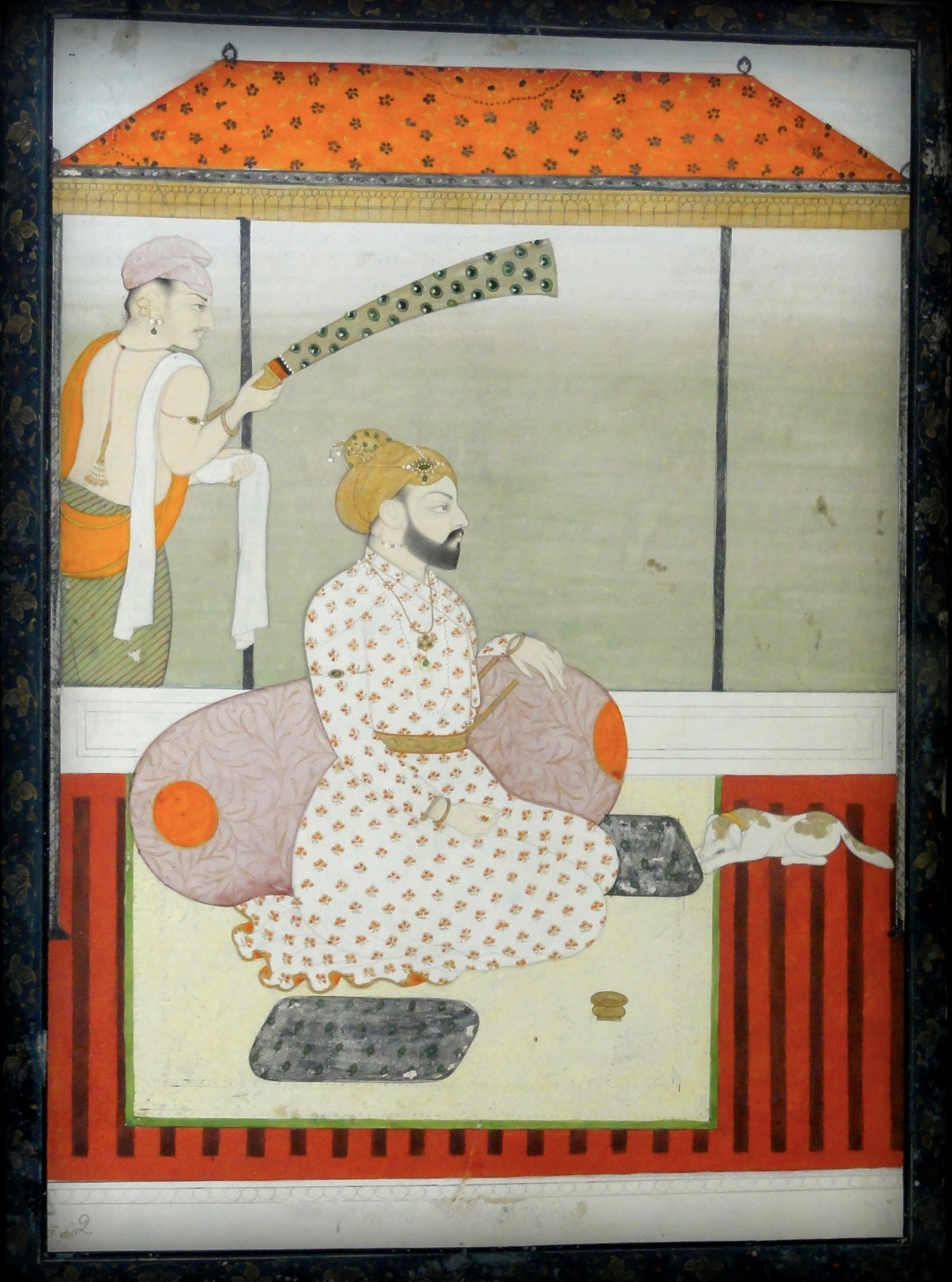
- Miniature painting depiction of Guru Angad

Personal life
- Born: Lehna; 31 March 1504 Matte-di-Sarai (Sarainaga), Sri Muktsar Sahib, Panjab, Delhi Sultanate
- Died: 29 March 1552 (aged 47) Khadur Sahib, Lahore Subah, Mughal Empire
- Spouse: Mata Khivi
- Children: Baba Dasu (1521–1598); Baba Dattu (1524–1575); Bibi Amro (1529–1601); Bibi Anokhi (1531–1608)
- Parent(s): Mata Ramo and Baba Pheru Mal
- Known for: Standardising the Gurmukhi Script
- Other names: Second Master; Second Nanak

Religious life
- Religion: Sikhism

Religious career
- Based in: Khadur
- Period in office: 1539–1552
- Predecessor: Guru Nanak
- Successor: Guru Amar Das

Guru Angad (31 March 1504 – 29 March 1552; Punjabi: ਗੁਰੂ ਅੰਗਦ, pronounced [gʊɾuː əŋgəd̯ᵊ]) was the second of the ten Sikh gurus of Sikhism. After meeting Guru Nanak, the founder of Sikhism, becoming a Sikh, and serving and working with Nanak for many years, Nanak gave Lehna the name Angad ("my own limb"), and chose Angad as the second Sikh Guru.

After the death of Nanak in 1539, Angad led the Sikh tradition. He is remembered in Sikhism for adopting and formalising the Gurmukhi alphabet. He began the process of compiling the hymns of Nanak and contributed 62 or 63 Saloks of his own. Instead of his own son, he chose his disciple Amar Das as his successor and the third Guru of Sikhism.

== Biography ==
=== Early life ===
Angad was born on 31 March 1504 with the birth name of Lehna (also transliterated as Lahina; Lahiṇā) in the village of Matte-di-Sarai (now Sarainaga) in Muktsar district of the Punjab region. He was the son of a small but successful trader named Pheru Mal. His mother's name was Mata Ramo (also known as Mata Sabhirai, Mansa Devi and Daya Kaur). His grandfather was named Baba Narayan Das Trehan. Like all the Sikh Gurus, Lehna came from Khatri caste and specifically the Trehan gotra (clan).

At age 16, Lehna married a Khatri girl named Khivi in January 1520. They had two sons, Datu (b. 1535) and Dasu (b. 1542), and one or two daughters, Amro (b. 1526) and Anokhi (b. 1535), depending on the primary sources. The entire family of his father had left their ancestral village in fear of the invasion of Babur's armies. After this the family settled at Khadur Sahib, a village by the River Beas near what is now Tarn Taran.

Before becoming a disciple of Guru Nanak and following the Sikh way of life as Angad, Lehna was a religious teacher of Khadur and a priest at a temple dedicated to the goddess Durga. His family had also been worshipers of Durga. He also embarked on many religious pilgrimages. On one of these pilgrimages, he happened to pass by the settlement of Kartarpur, that had been established by Nanak, on the way to his ultimate destination. It is said that a dialogue then occurred there between Lehna and Nanak, in-which the former was left with a deeply positive impression of the latter. Thereafter, Lehna remained at Kartarpur for six years serving his newfound spiritual master.

Lehna in his late 20s sought out Guru Nanak, became his disciple, and displayed deep and loyal service to his Guru for about six to seven years in Kartarpur and renounced the Hindu way of life.

=== Selection as successor ===
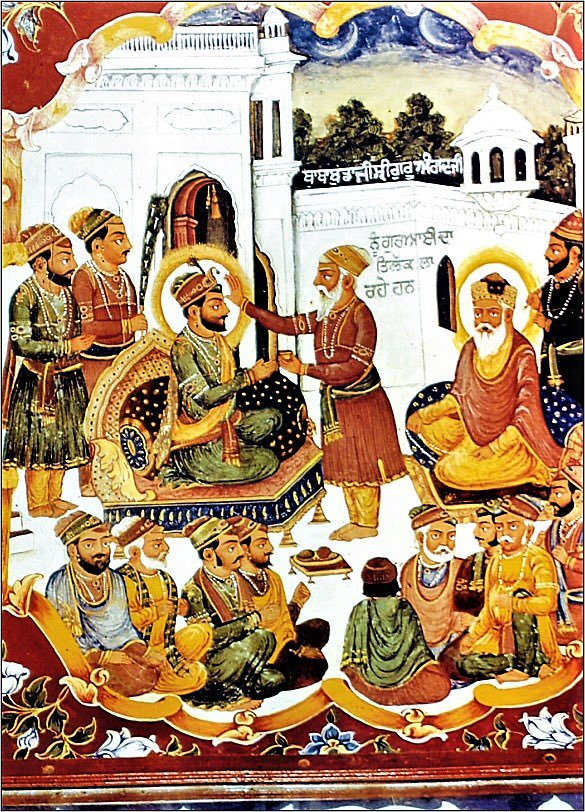
Gurgadi ceremony of Angad being proclaimed as the next guru. Fresco from Gurdwara Baba Atal, Amritsar.

Several stories in the Sikh tradition describe reasons why Lehna was chosen by Guru Nanak over his own sons as his choice of successor. One of these stories is about a jug which fell into mud, and Nanak asked his sons to pick it up. Nanak's sons would not pick it up because it was too dirty or menial a task. Then he asked Lehna, who however picked it out of the mud, washed it clean, and presented it to Nanak full of water. Lehna was selected as the successor of Guru Nanak on 14 June 1539 but his formal installation ceremony occurred later that year on 7 September 1539. Nanak touched him and renamed him Angad (from Ang, or part of the body) and named him as his successor and the second Guru on 7 September 1539.

After Nanak died on 22 September 1539, Guru Angad unable to bear the separation from Nanak retired into a room in a disciple's house in a state of Vairagya. Baba Buddha later discovered him after a long search and requested him to return for Guruship. The Gurbani uttered at the time, "Die before the one whom you love, to live after he dies is to live a worthless life in this world".

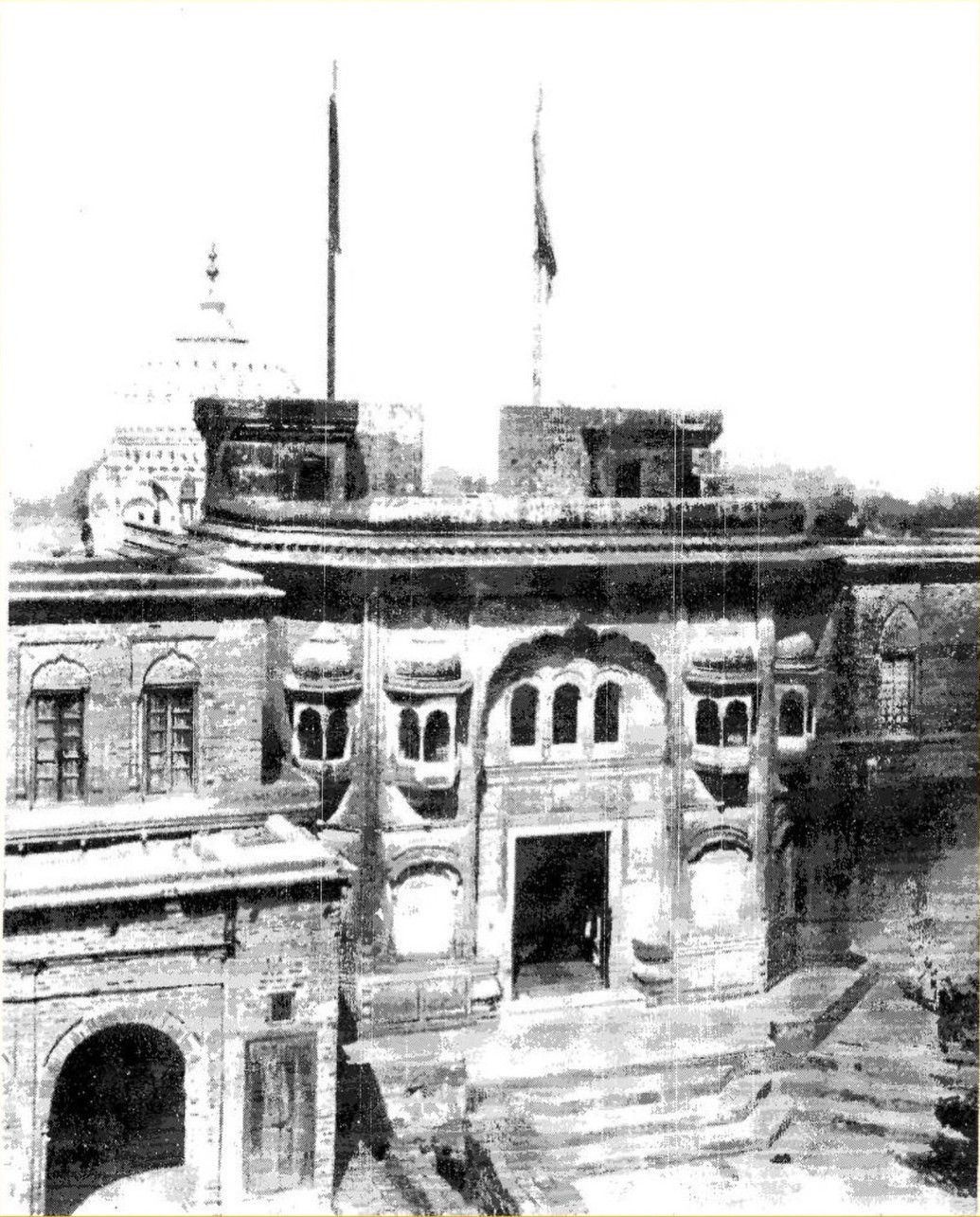
Historical photograph of Gurdwara Sri Khadur Sahib, ca.1920's. Published in the 1930 first edition of Mahan Kosh by Kahn Singh Nabha.

Angad later left Kartarpur for the village of Khadur Sahib (near Goindwal Sahib). Post succession, at one point, very few Sikhs accepted Guru Angad as their leader while the sons of Nanak claimed to be the successors. Angad focused on the teachings of Nanak, and building the community through charitable works such as langar.

=== Relationship with the Mughal Empire ===
The second Mughal Emperor of India Humayun visited Guru Angad at around 1540 after Humayun lost the Battle of Kannauj, and thereby the Mughal throne to Sher Shah Suri. According to Sikh hagiographies, when Humayun arrived in Gurdwara Mal Akhara Sahib at Khadur Sahib, Angad was sitting and teaching children. The failure to greet the Emperor immediately angered Humayun. Humayun lashed out but the Guru reminded him that the time Humayun needed to fight, he had lost his throne and ran away. Now, the time that Humayun did not need to fight he sought to attack a person engaged in prayer. In the Sikh texts written more than a century after the event, Angad is said to have blessed the emperor, and reassured him that someday he will regain the throne.

=== Death and successor ===
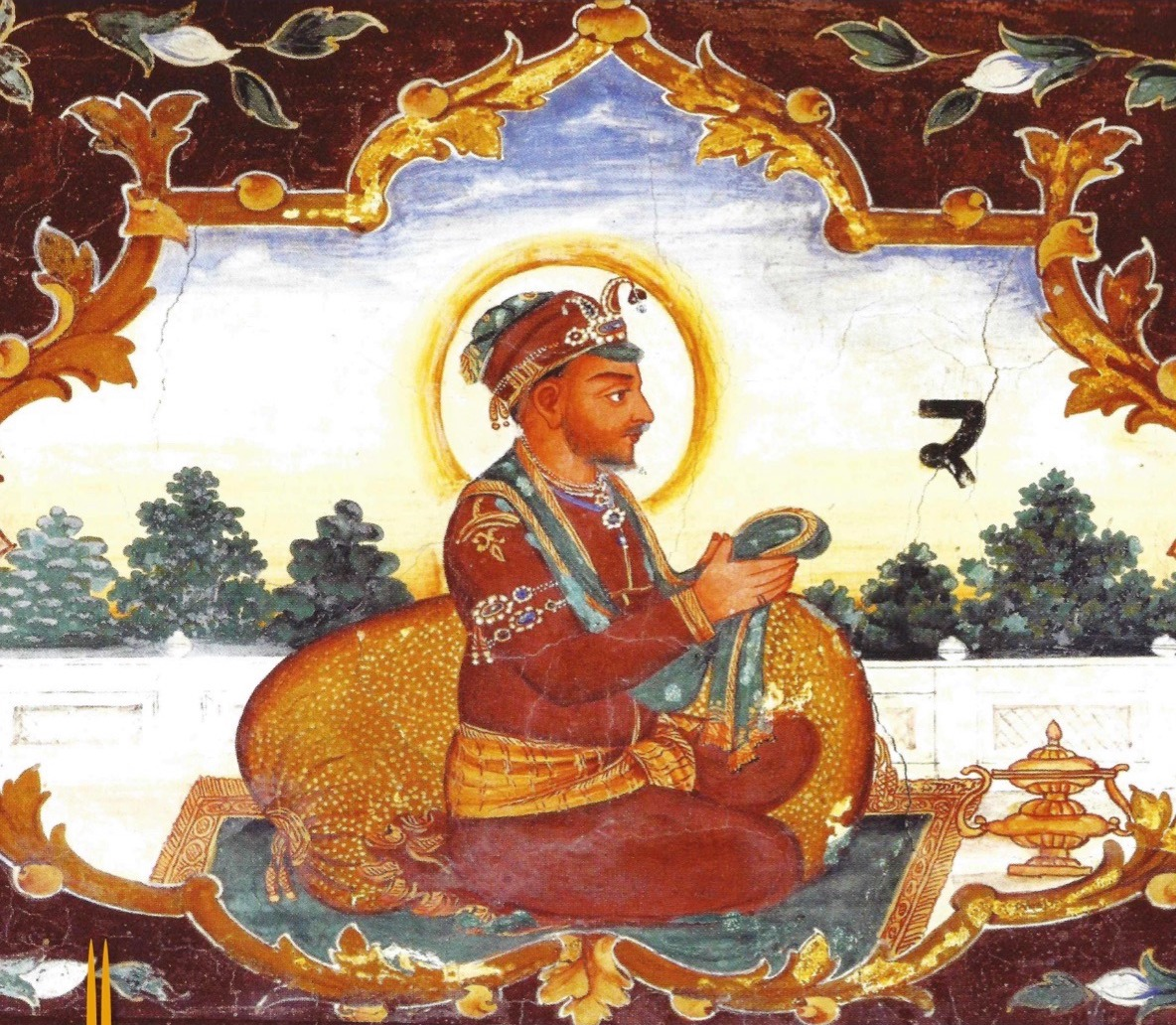
Fresco of the second Sikh Guru at Baoli Sahib, Goindval

Before his death, Guru Angad, following the example set by Guru Nanak, nominated Guru Amar Das as his successor. Amar Das was born into a Hindu family and had been reputed to have gone on some twenty pilgrimages into the Himalayas, to Haridwar on river Ganges. About 1539, on one such Hindu pilgrimage, he met a sadhu, or ascetic, who asked him why he did not have a guru (teacher, spiritual counsellor) and Amar Das decided to get one. On his return, he heard Bibi Amro, the daughter of Angad who had married his brother's son, singing a hymn by Nanak. Amar Das learnt from her about Guru Angad, and with her help met Angad in 1539, adopting Angad as his spiritual Guru, who was much younger than his own age.

Amar Das displayed relentless devotion and service to Guru Angad. Sikh tradition states that he woke up in the early hours to fetch water for Angad's bath, cleaned and cooked for the volunteers with the Guru, as well devoted much time to meditation and prayers in the morning and evening. Angad named Amar Das as his successor in 1552. Angad died on 29 March 1552. After Angad's passing, the Sikh community's headquarters was shifted from Khadur to Goindwal by his successor, Guru Amardas, as Guru Angad's sons claimed their father's property at Khadur. According to one story, Dattu, one of Angad's two sons, travelled to Amar Das' court and kicked the new guru as he was unhappy that the guruship went to Amar Das, with the guru responding in a humble manner.

== Influence ==
=== Gurmukhi script ===
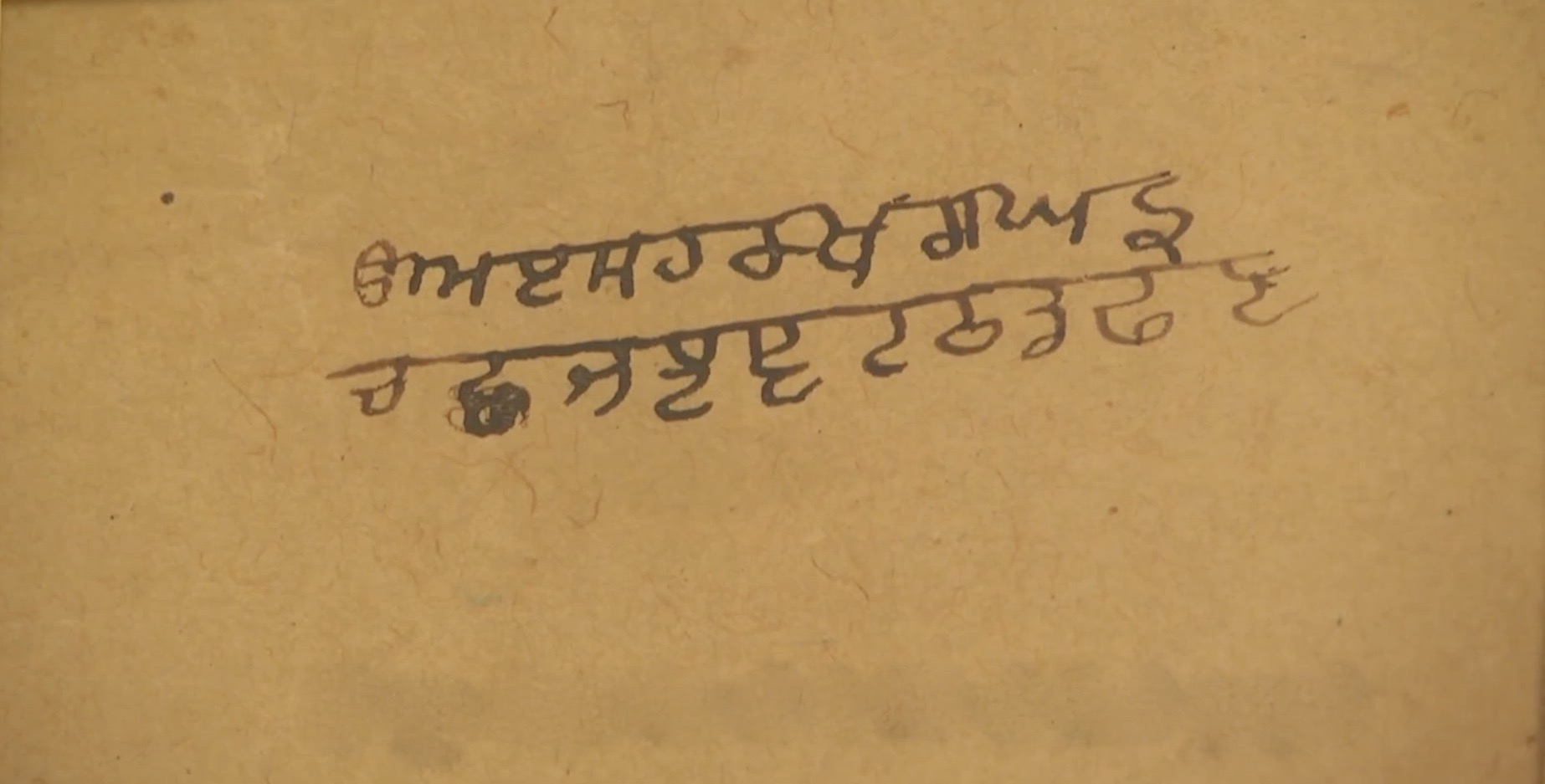
Gurmukhi inscription claimed to have been handwritten by Guru Angad to teach children at Khadur Sahib the glyphs ūṛā to ṇāṇā, ca.1539–1552

Guru Angad is credited in the Sikh tradition with the Gurmukhi script, which is now the standard writing script for Punjabi language in India, in contrast to Punjabi language in Pakistan where now a Perso-Arabic script called Shahmukhi is the standard. The original Sikh scriptures and most of the historic Sikh literature have been written in the Gurmukhi script.

Angad standardised and made improvements to the scripts of the region to create the Gurmukhi script. Examples of possible forerunners of the script including at least one hymn written in acrostic form by Guru Nanak, and its earlier history is yet to be fully determined.

Angad also wrote 62 or 63 Saloks (compositions), which together constitute about one percent of the Guru Granth Sahib, the primary scripture of Sikhism. Rather than contribute hymns, Angad's importance was as a consolidator of Nanak's hymns. Angad would also supervise the writing down of Nanak's hymns by Bhai Paira Mokha and scrutinize the resulting compilation, preparing the way for a Sikh scripture, as well as the beginning of a vernacular Punjabi literature, as tradition holds that he may have also commissioned an account of Nanak's life from earlier disciples. The collection of hymns would also be increasingly important for the expanding community.

Whilst the creation of the Gurmukhi script is commonly attributed to the second guru of the Sikhs, Guru Angad, according to Mangat Bhardwaj the Gurmukhi script or its antecedents pre-date the development of Sikhism by several centuries. Sikh scholars themselves, such as Kahn Singh of Nabha (1930), G. B. Singh (1950), Piara Singh Padam (1954), and G. S. Sidhu (2004), have documented Gurmukhi prior to the arising of Sikhism. The glyphs and symbols employed in Gurmukhi pre-date Sikhism and it is more likely that Guru Angad standardized the pre-existing scripts around 1530–1535 to create the standard Gurmukhi script under the purview of Guru Nanak.

=== Langar and community work ===
Guru Angad is notable for systematising the institution of langar in all Sikh gurdwara premises, where visitors from near and far could get a free simple meal in a communal seating. He also set the rules and training method for volunteers (sevadars) who operated the kitchen, placing emphasis on treating it as a place of rest and refuge, being always polite and hospitable to all visitors.

Angad visited other places and centres established by Guru Nanak for the preaching of Sikhism. He established new centres and thus strengthened its base.

=== Wrestling ===
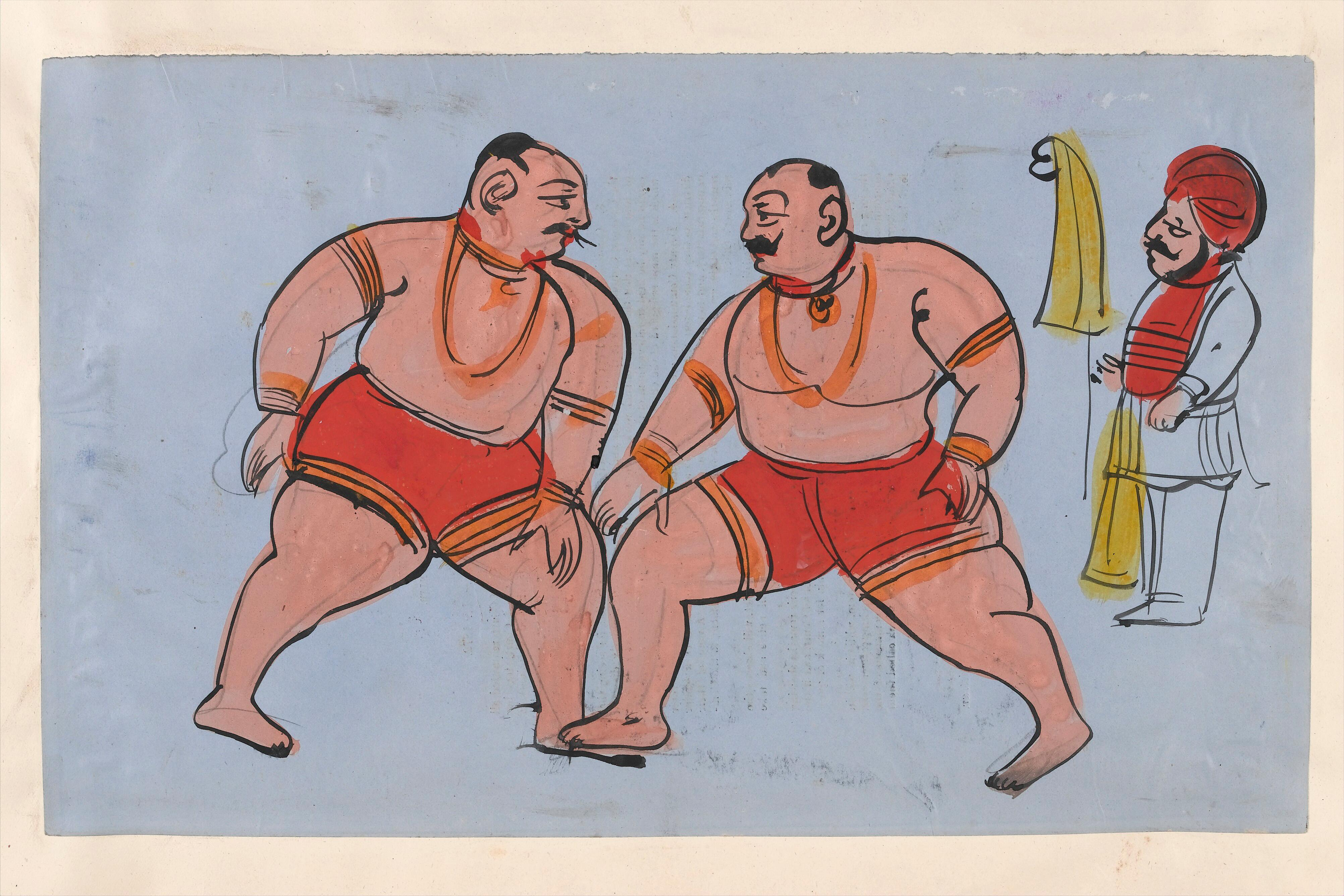
19th century watercolour of two Sikh wrestlers in a match.

Angad, being a great patron of wrestling, started a Mall Akhara (wrestling arena) system where physical exercises, martial arts, and wrestling was taught as well as health topics such as staying away from tobacco and other toxic substances. He placed emphasis on keeping the body healthy and exercising daily. He founded many such Mall Akharas in many villages including a few in Khandur. Typically the wrestling was done after daily prayers and also included games and light wrestling.

=== Biography of Nanak ===
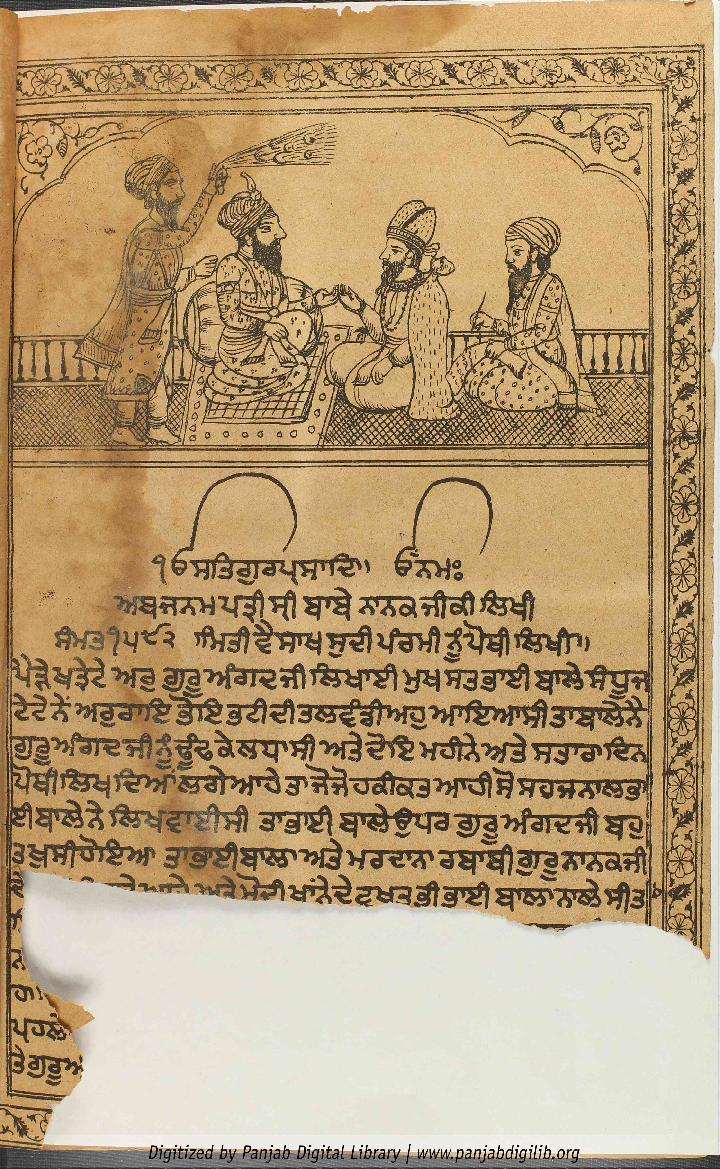
Illustration of Guru Angad and Bhai Bala, with the Bhai Bala Janamsakhi being put into writing, lithograph print, from the 'Pothi Janam Sakhi Bhai Bale Ji Ki', circa mid-to-late-19th century

It is said that Guru Angad commissioned the compiling of a biography covering the life of his predecessor, Guru Nanak. However, the identity of the work and whether or not it ever existed or even survives to the present-day, is debated. Some believe the Bhai Bala Vali tradition of the Janamsakhi literature was the biography on Nanak ordered by Angad.

== Literature ==
In-contrast to his predecessor, Guru Angad only left a small number of written works that he authored. Some salok poetry found in the Guru Granth Sahib was authored by Angad.

== Gallery ==
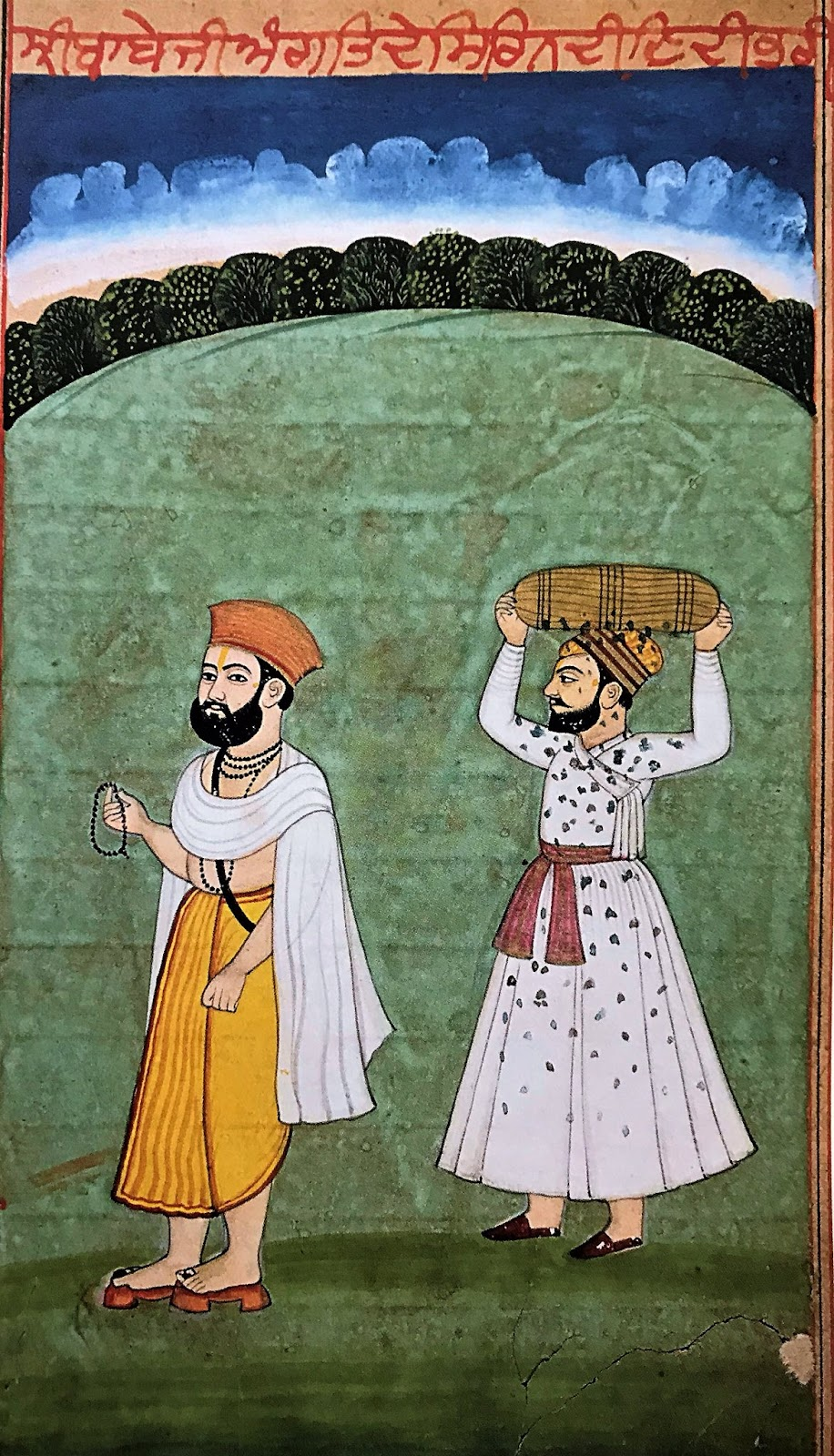
Guru Nanak (left) with Bhai Lehna (right, who would later be known as Guru Angad).

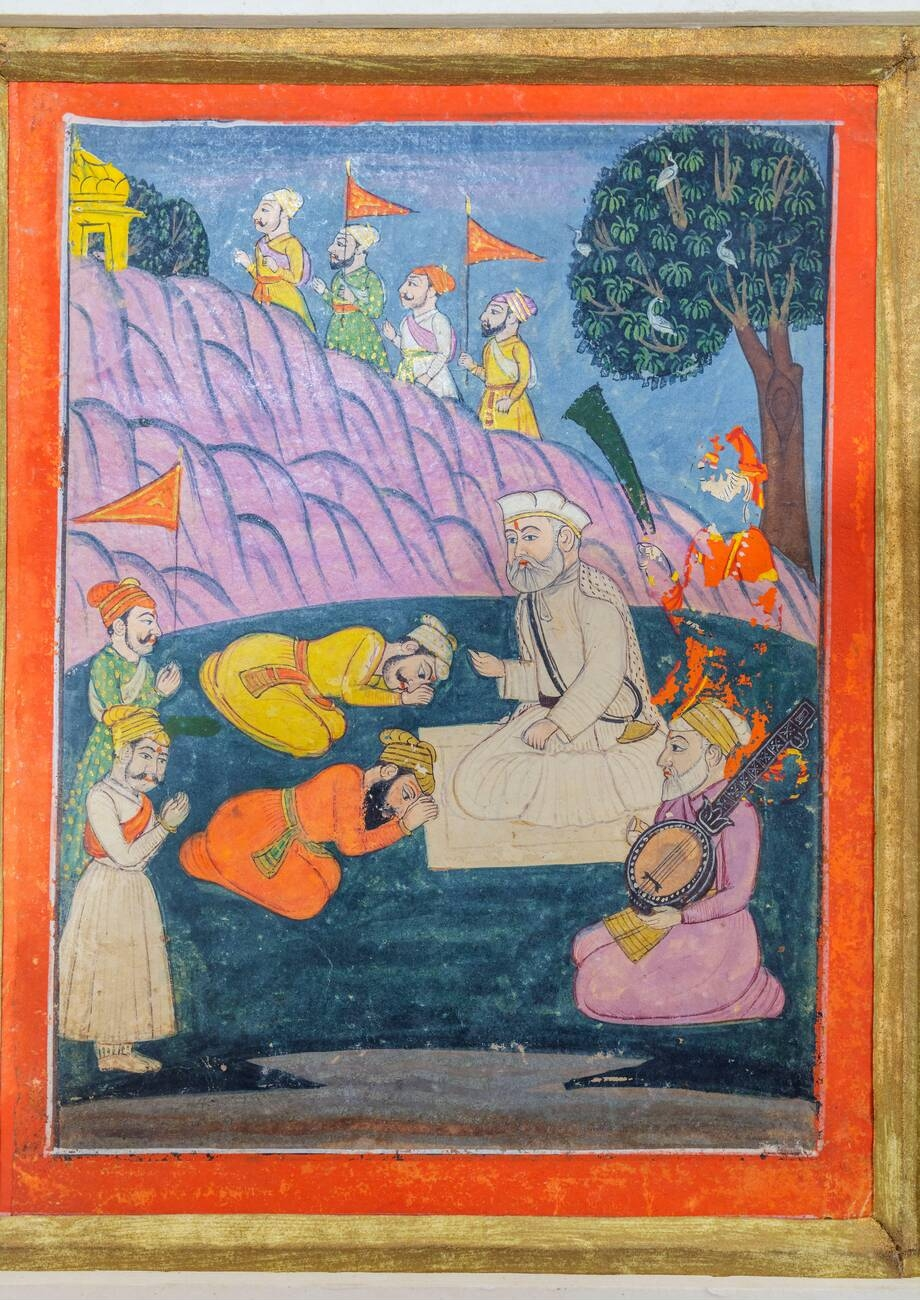
Guru Angad taking-leave of Guru Nanak, painting from an 1830's Janamsakhi.

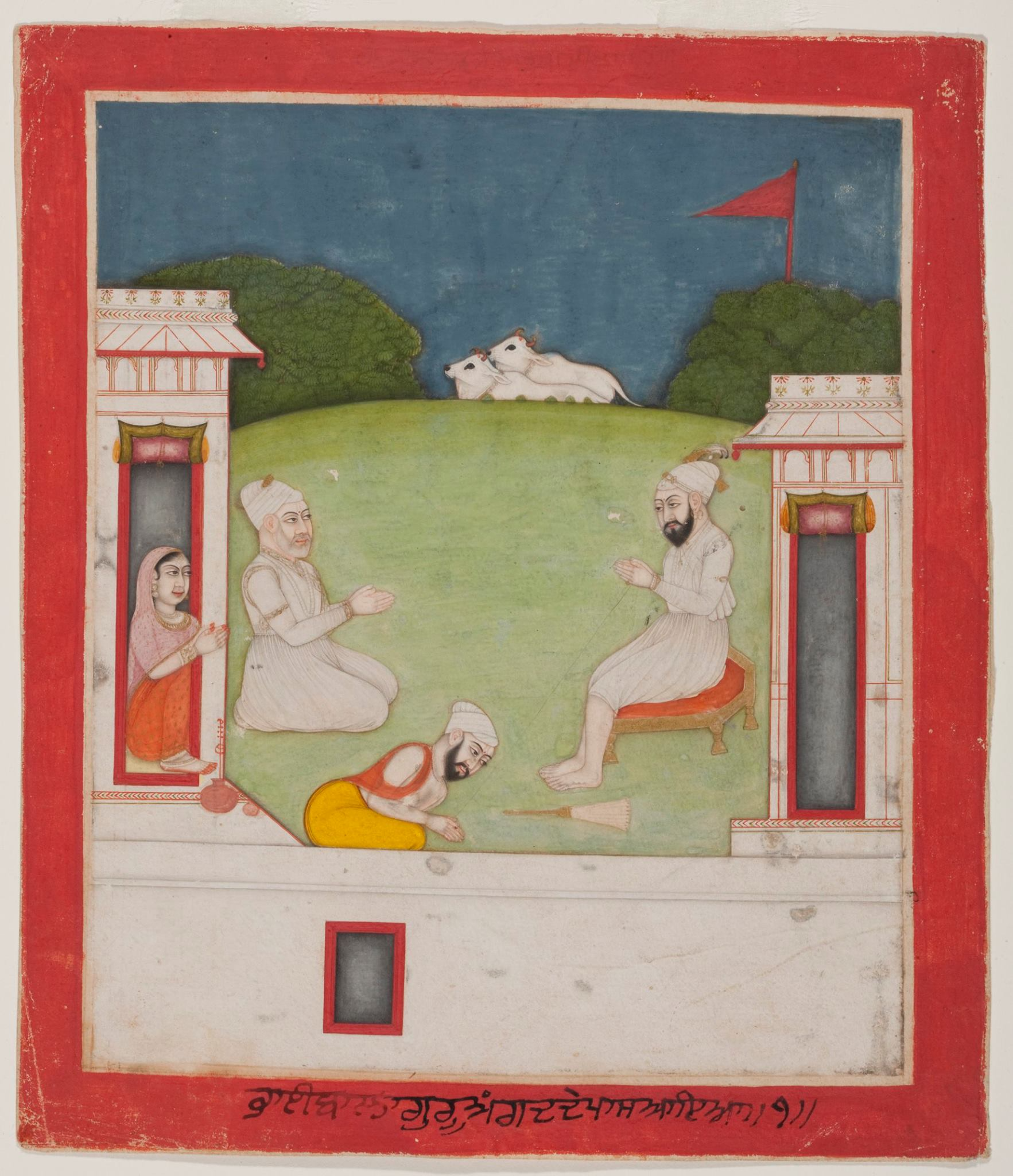
Bhai Bala (left) recites the life story of Guru Nanak to Guru Angad amid onlookers. Janamsakhi painting.

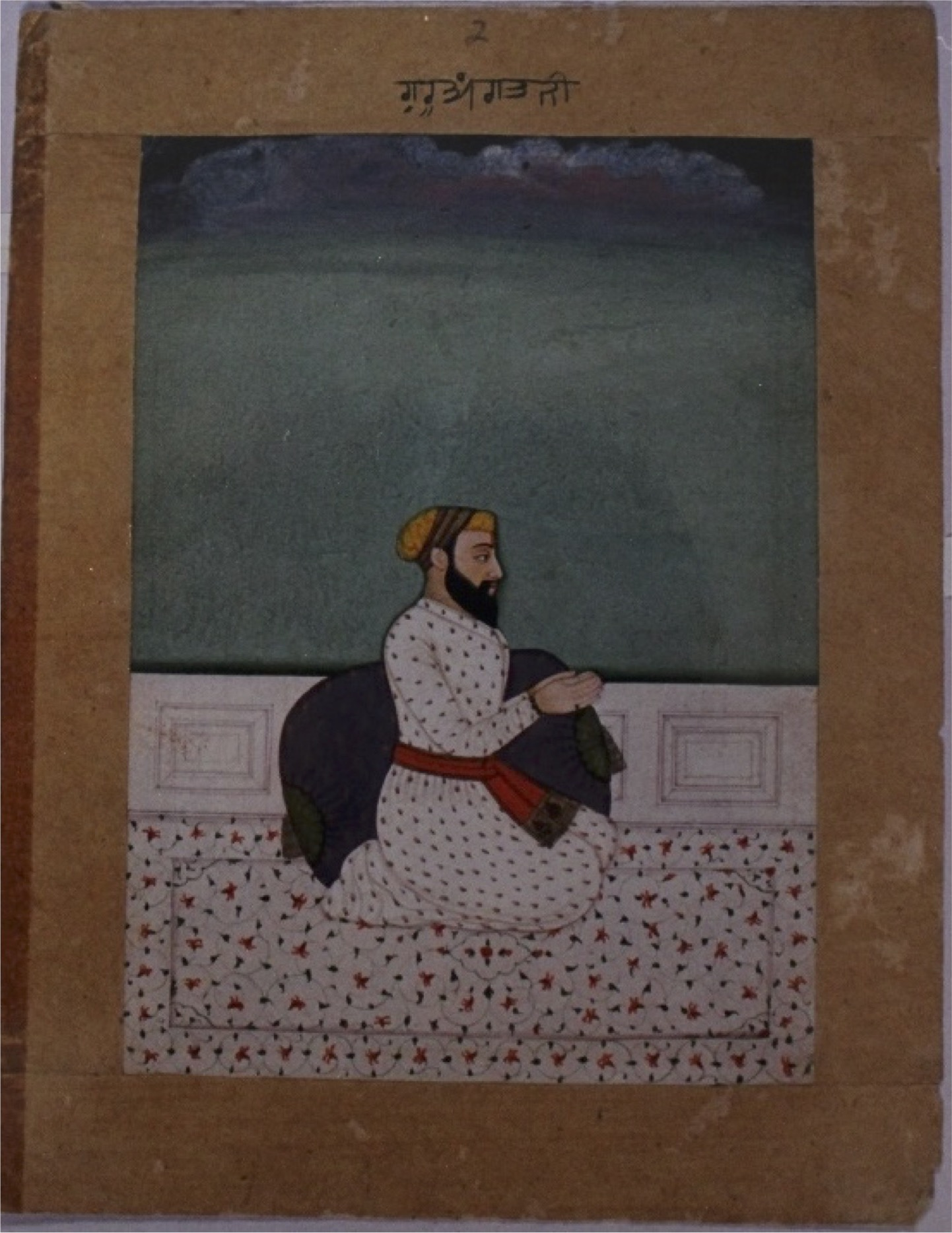
Miniature painting of Guru Angad.

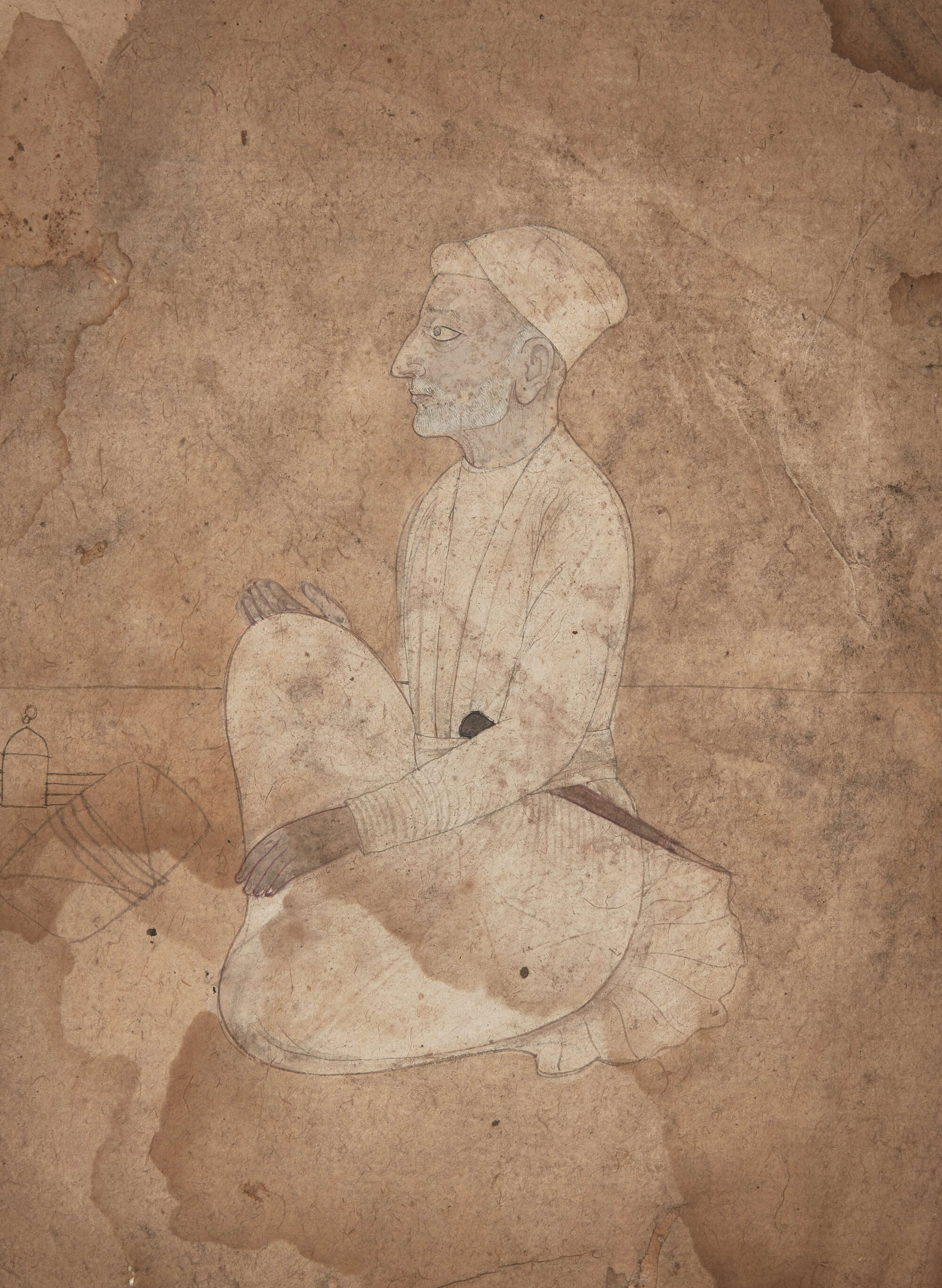
Guru Angad drawing from early 19th century.

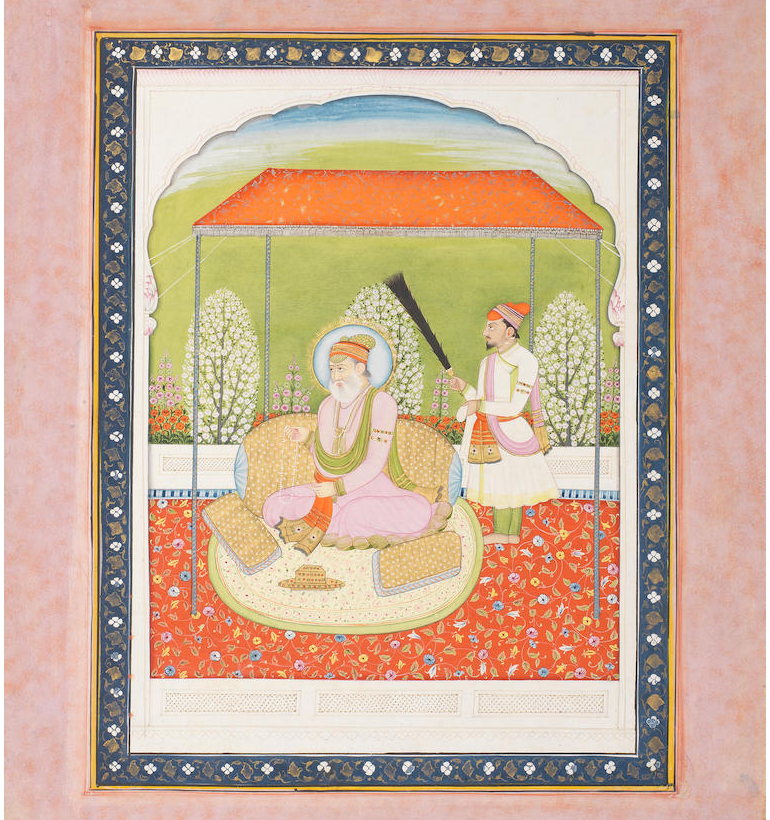
Guru Angad Seated on a Terrace Beneath a Canopy With an Attendant, Punjab Plains, circa 1830.

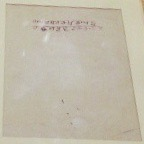
Gurmukhi inscription handwritten by Guru Angad Dev

== See also ==
- Guru Granth Sahib
- List of places named after Guru Angad Dev

Preceded by Guru Nanak	Sikh Guru; 7 September 1539 – 26 March 1552	Succeeded by Guru Amar Das
