= Pangat =

Sikh tradition

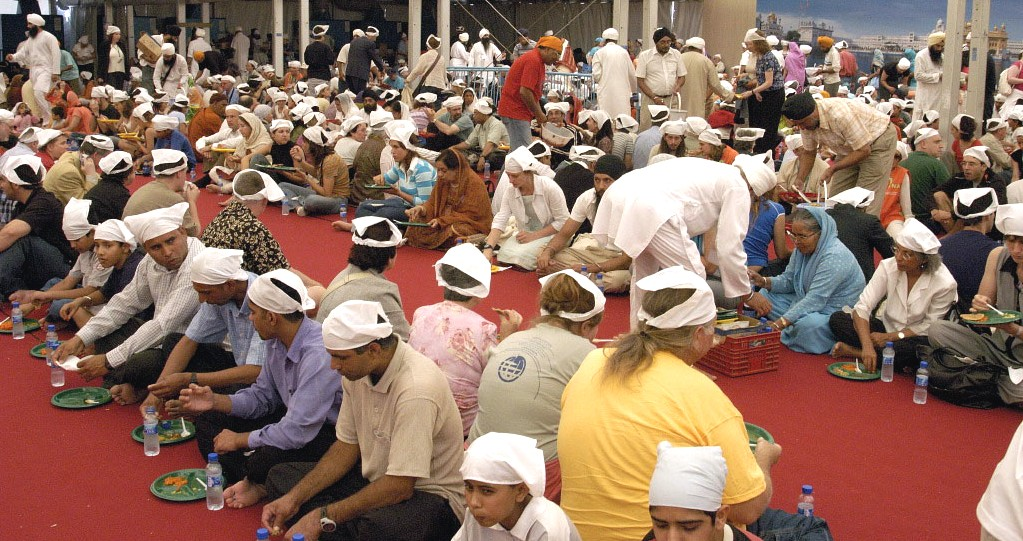
People sitting in pangats while consuming langar.

Pangat (Punjabi: ਪੰਗਤ (Gurmukhi)) is a word derived from the Sanskrit word pankti (पङ्क्ति) that means a line, a row, or a group. It refers to the Sikh concept of commensality. In Sikhism, it refers to the lines that the congregation (sangat) must sit in while engaging in langar (free kitchen) for the purpose of ending caste and other discrimination.

It is a synonym for Guru Ka Langar. In a Pangat, food is served by volunteers (Sevadars) to people of all religions who sit together to eat. Pangat is about eating food while sitting in rows with no discrimination on the basis of caste, creed, race, ethnicity, gender, religion or economic status. According to the beliefs of Sikhism, nobody sleeps without eating, nor should anybody die of hunger.

Pangat consists of systematic rows where everyone eats equally regardless of their background.

== History ==
Pangat and Sangat came together from the time of Guru Nanak, the first Guru of Sikhism. Nanak's father gave him money for trade that he spent on feeding hungry sadhus. He named this that True Transaction (Sacha Sauda). Where there is Sangat, there is always a Langar (food service). According to Sikh principles all people (Sangat) who sit in pangat share food on equal basis. Another claim is that the Pangat tradition was introduced by Mata Khivi.

Guru Amar Das placed special importance on the concept of pangat, with him stating:

Pehle pangat phir sangat

— Guru Amar Das
Translation:

First pangat, then sangat

In the history of Sikhism, when Emperor Akbar and the King of Haripur went to meet Guru Amar Das, the third Guru of Sikhism. They both had to eat Langar in the pangat before meeting the Guru.

== See also ==
- Langar (Sikhism)
