= Khadur Sahib =

Khadur Sahib Khadoor Sahib
- Town
- Location in Punjab, India
- Coordinates: 31°25′26″N 75°05′52″E
- Country: India
- State: Punjab
- District: Tarn Taran
- Region of Punjab: Majha

Area
  - Total: 16.13 km^{2} (6.23 sq mi)

Population (2011)
  - Total: 11,054
  - Density: 685.3/km^{2} (1,775/sq mi)

Languages
  - Official: Punjabi
- Time zone: UTC+5:30 (IST)
- PIN: 143117
- Vehicle registration: PB-63

Khadur Sahib is a town and a nagar panchayat in Tarn Taran district of Khadur Sahib tehsil of the Majha region of Indian state of Punjab. Khadur Sahib is a historical place in view of eight out of ten sikh gurus having visited this place. The postal index number of Khadur Sahib is 143117.

== History ==
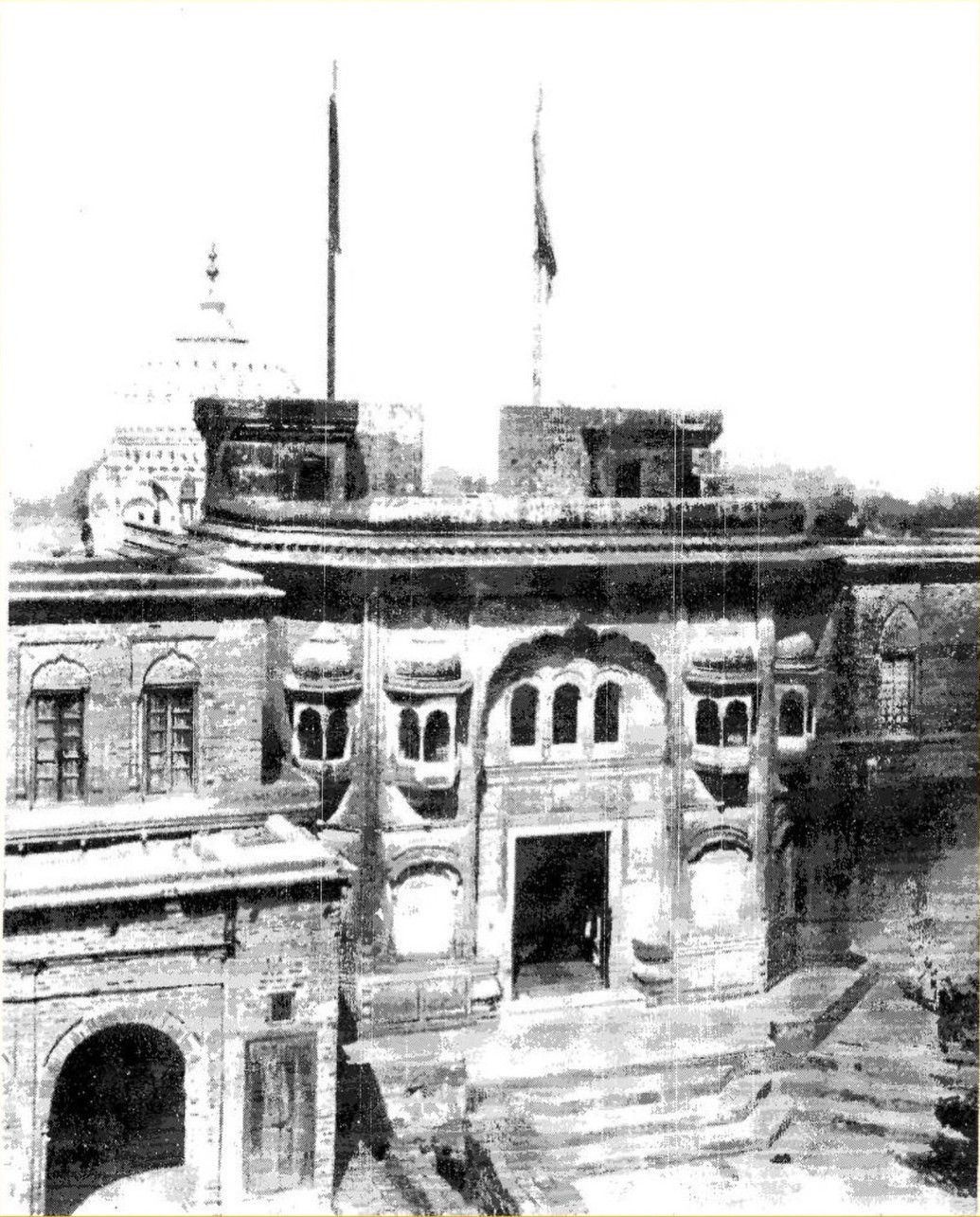
Historical photograph of Gurdwara Sri Khadur Sahib, ca.1920s. Published in the 1930 first edition of Mahan Kosh by Kahn Singh Nabha. Possibly photographed in 1924.

Khadur is a village associated with the second guru of the Sikhs, Guru Angad (1504–1552). He moved the early Sikh community's centre from Kartarpur to Khadur after becoming the guru after Nanak's passing and due to opposition from Nanak's sons. Khadur was the base of operations of Guru Angad from 1539–1551. After Guru Angad passed, the community's headquarters was again moved by Guru Amar Das (1551–1574) to Goindval for similar reasons, them namely being challenges he faced from Angad's sons.

== Demographics ==
As per 2011 Census of India, Khadur Sahib had 2,027 number of households and total population was 11,054 persons. There were a total of 5,795 males, 5,259 females in 2011 in this town. The total number of children of 6 years or below were 1,318. The percentage of male population was 52.42%, the percentage of female population was 47.58% and the percentage of child population was 11.92%. Average Gender Ratio (AGR) of Khadur Sahib was 908 which is higher than Punjab state average of 895.

=== Literacy ===
In 2011, the literacy rate of Khadur Sahib was 73.45 % compared to 75.84 % for Punjab; male literacy was 77.46 % and female literacy rate was 69.08 %.

== Education ==
Shri Guru Angad Dev College is located in Khadur Sahib, which is affiliated to Guru Nanak Dev University, Amritsar. It was established in 1970.
