= Gurdwara Qila Anandgarh Sahib =

Sikh gurdwara in Anandpur Sahib, India

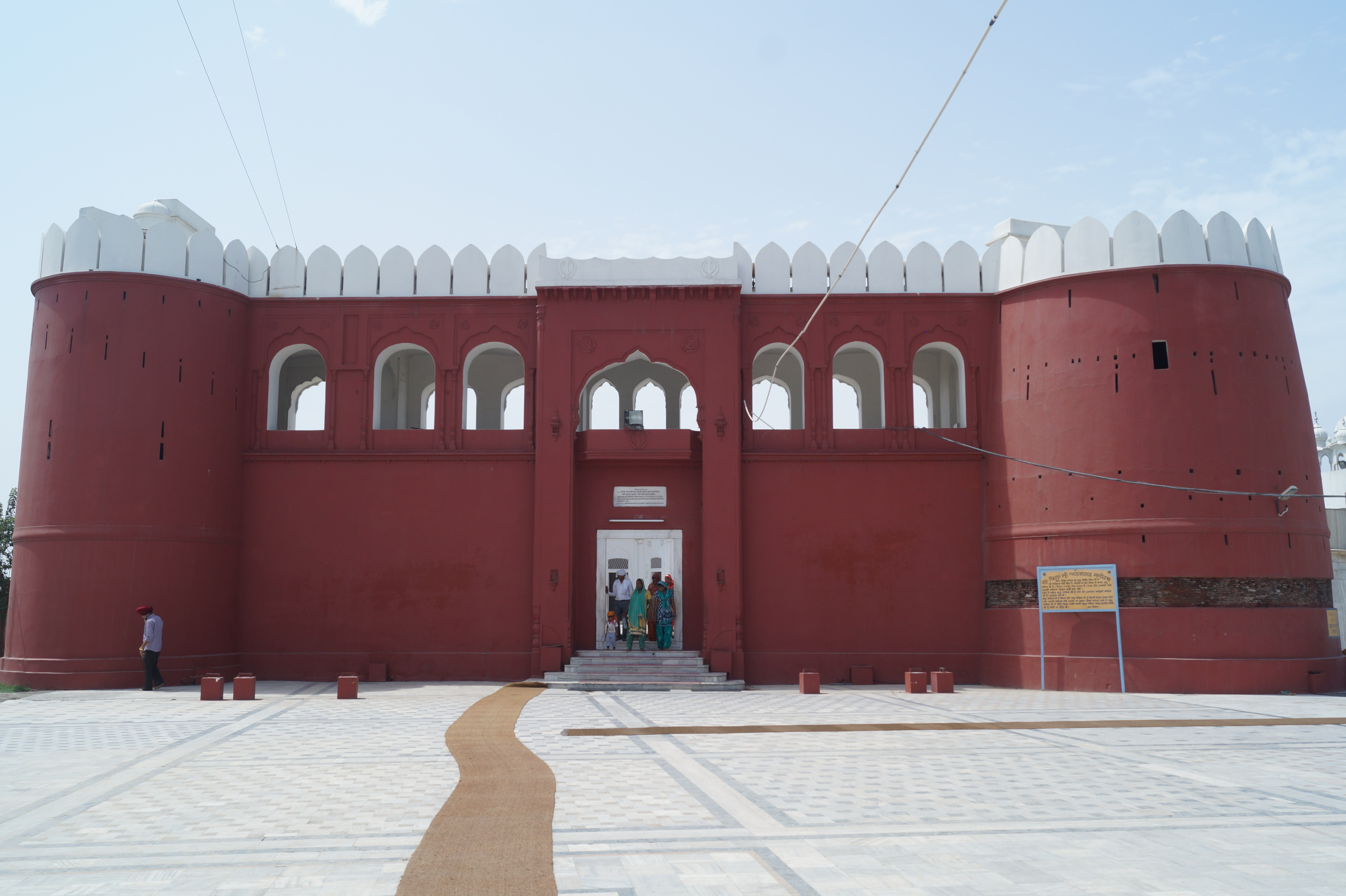

Religion
- Affiliation: Sikhism
- District: Rupnagar
- Festival: Hola Mahalla

Location
- Location: Anandpur Sahib
- State: Punjab
- Country: India
- Interactive map of Gurdwara Qila Anandgarh Sahib
- Coordinates: 31.2317°N 76.5054°E

Architecture
- Type: Gurdwara and Qila
- Style: Sikh architecture
- Founder: Guru Gobind Singh

Gurdwara Qila Anandgarh Sahib, alternatively spelt as Anandgarh Qila (meaning "fort of bliss"), is a gurdwara and qila fortress in the city of Anandpur Sahib, Rupnagar district, Punjab, India. Located near Virasat-e-Khalsa museum, it was one of the five forts of Guru Gobind Singh, the tenth Guru of Sikhs.

== History ==
This Gurdwara was one of the five forts constructed by Guru Gobind Singh at Anandpur Sahib for the defense of the Sikhs. Guru Gobind Singh spent 25 years at Anandgarh Qila. This fort was built by Guru Gobind Singh to fight battles with hill Rajas and Mughal Empire and At this place, Guru Gobind Singh Ji fought many battles with Mughals and hill Rajas. It is the highest fort of Anandpur Sahib, which is located on the hill since ancient times. The current structure of the fortress was built in the 1970s under Seva Singh. There is a Baoli Sahib (stepped-well) underneath the fort that is accessible via a passage-way.

=== Forts ===
The Qilas (meaning "fortress"), constructed by Guru Gobind Singh at Anandpur Sahib are:

1. Takht Kesgarh Sahib Qila at the center (now a Takhat)

2. Anandgarh Qila (fort of bliss)

3. Lohgarh Qila (fort of steel)

4. Holgarh Qila (fort of colour)

5. Fatehgarh Qila (fort of victory)

6. Taragarh Qila (fort of stars)

All the Qilas were joined together with earthworks and tunnels. All Qila Situated at Anandpur Sahib. The original structures of the forts were destroyed by Kar Seva renovators in the 20th century and marble Gurdwaras were constructed in their former location.

== Gallery ==
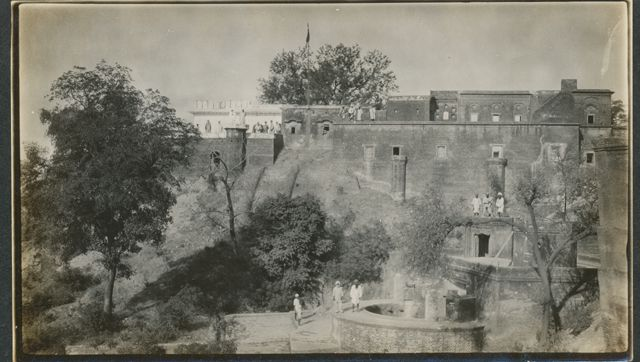
Historical photograph of Qila Anandgarh, by Dhanna Singh Chahal 'Patialvi', clicked in May 1934

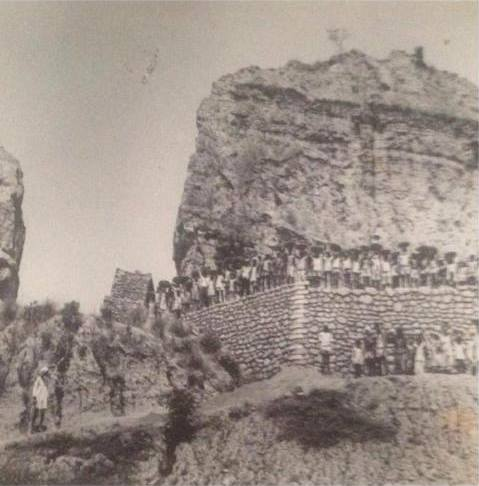
Photograph of Qila Anandgarh Sahib in Anandpur Sahib during excavation, renovation, or demolition work

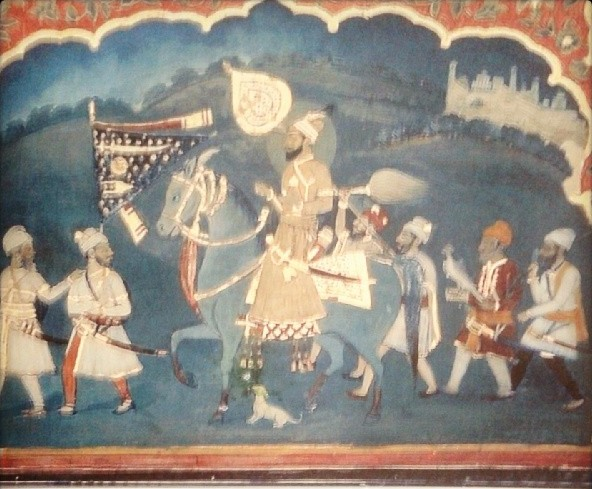
Harmandir Sahib mural (fresco) depicting Guru Gobind Singh on horseback with his retinue from within the Golden Temple shrine, ca.1820's–1830's. As per Kanwarjit Singh Kang (1988), Guru Gobind Singh is depicted riding away from Anandpur Fort (Qila) with his retinue in this painting.
