= Market place of dead =

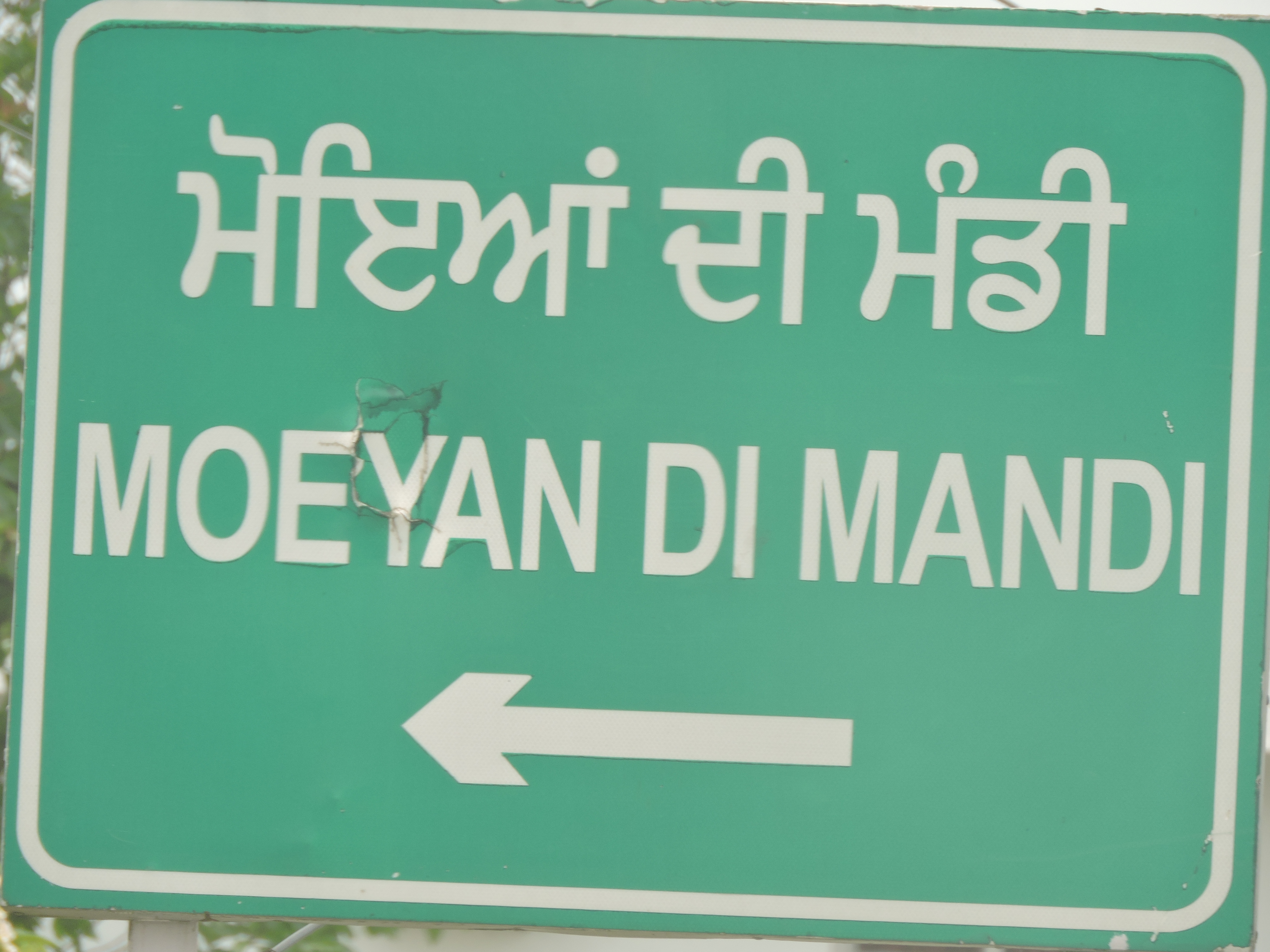
"Moyan di Mandi", Anadpur Sahib, Punjab, (Signboard

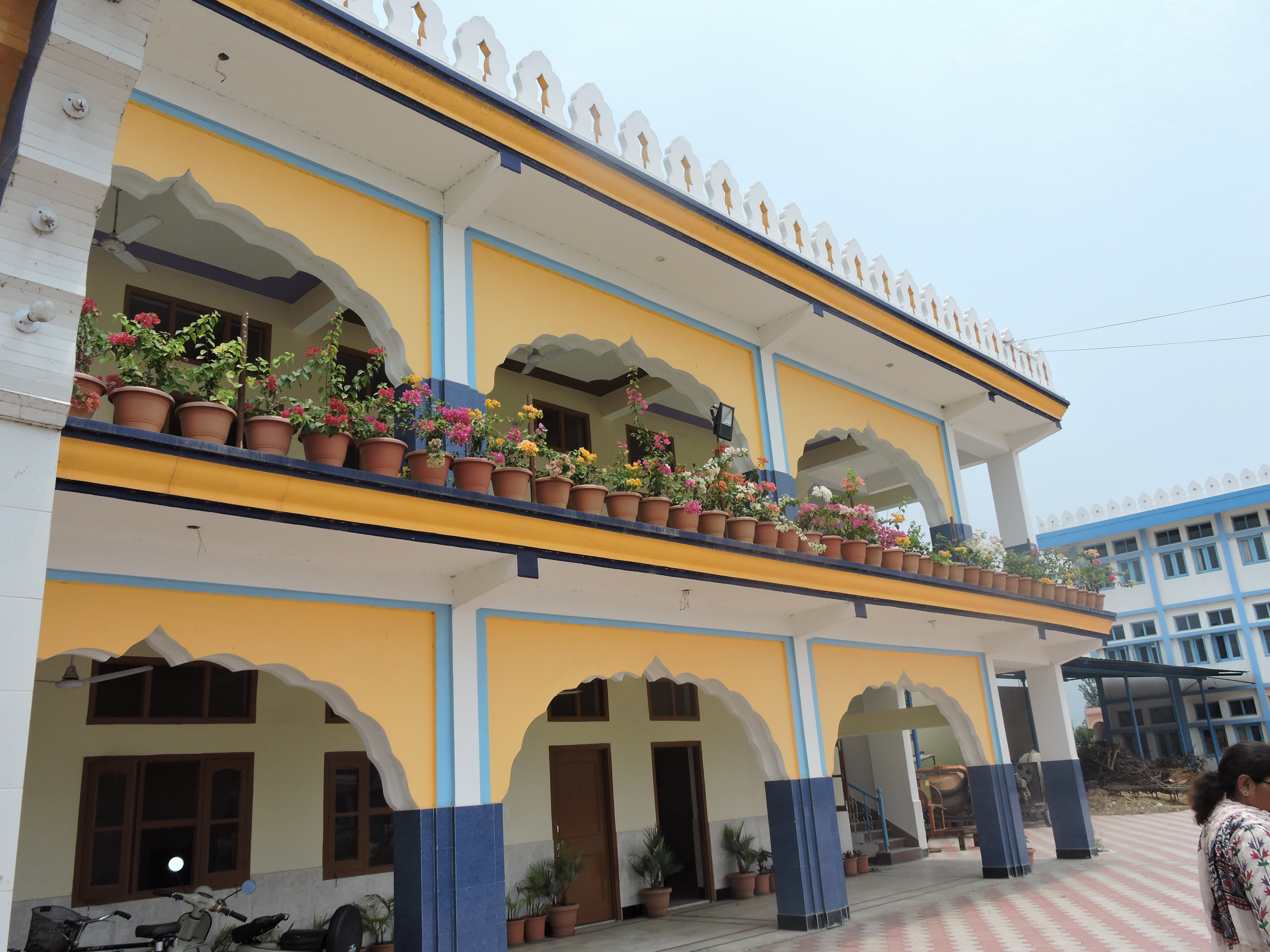
" Moyan di mandi" ,(Market Place of dead) Anandpur Sahib, Punjab,

Market place of dead is a religious place near the historical town Anandpur Sahib, of Punjab State of India. Locally it is known as (Dera) Moiyan di mandi( Punjabi: (ਡੇਰਾ) ਮੋਇਆਂ ਦੀ ਮੰਡੀ ). It is situated at a distance of one kilometre on the link road before Anandpur town toward left side on Chandigarh Anandpur Highway. Although it has a distinct history and background yet it is not very popular in the area.

== History and background ==
This place was established originally by a retired Army officer. As per the tradition of this religious place any person who want to be its follower is supposed to declare himself dead. It is done through digging his own pit grave and lye for one day in it. He himself has to perform his last rites. After that he will declare himself dead and will be accepted as a disciple of the Dera. Then he will disown all property and worldly means, in his name. The accepted disciple has to prepare his own garment to wear made of sack and eat staple food which he himself has to prepare from the waste food collected from Gurdwaras, dry it and eat for coming months. The time is spent in helping the poor and ill people of nearby villages and doing meditation. Kirtan is recited inside the place continuously as per Sikh tradition.
