= Dasgrain =

- Village
- Location within Punjab Location within India
- Coordinates: 31.268794°N 76.425319°E
- Country: India
- State: Punjab
- District: Rupnagar
- Elevation: 275 m (902 ft)

Population (2011)
  - Total: 1,245

Languages
  - Official: Punjabi
- Time zone: UTC+5:30 (IST)
- PIN: 140 123
- Telephone code: 91-1887
- Vehicle registration: PB 12

Dasgrain is a village in tehsil Anandpur Sahib of district Rupnagar in the state of Punjab, India. It is situated on the bank of Satluj River and is surrounded by four villages Dher, Khanpur, Mahain, Majari, Harsa Bela and Patti Tek Singh. The village is well connected by NH21.

== Administration ==
The village has panchayat system. Kuldeep Singh is the current sarpanch of the village as per elections held in the year 2013.

== Connectivity ==
The village is well connected via Road and Rail. Sirhind to Amb railway line and NH22 runs through the village. The nearest railway station and Bus stand are Anandpur Sahib.

== Education ==
The village have two schools both run by govt of Punjab.

Govt. Primary School, Dasgrain

Govt. High School, Dasgrain
