= Anandpur Sahib =

Sri Anandpur Sahib Anandpur
- City
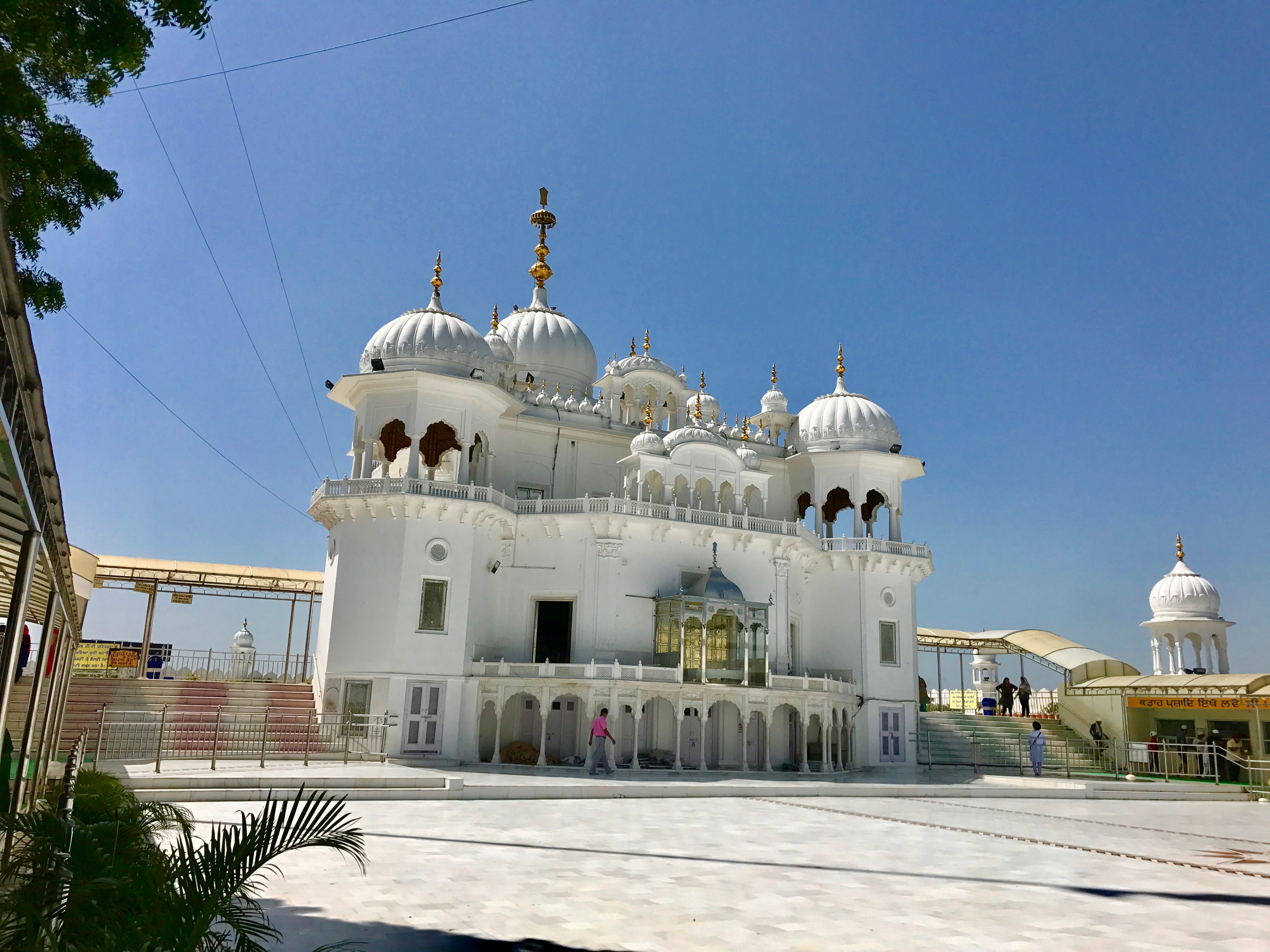
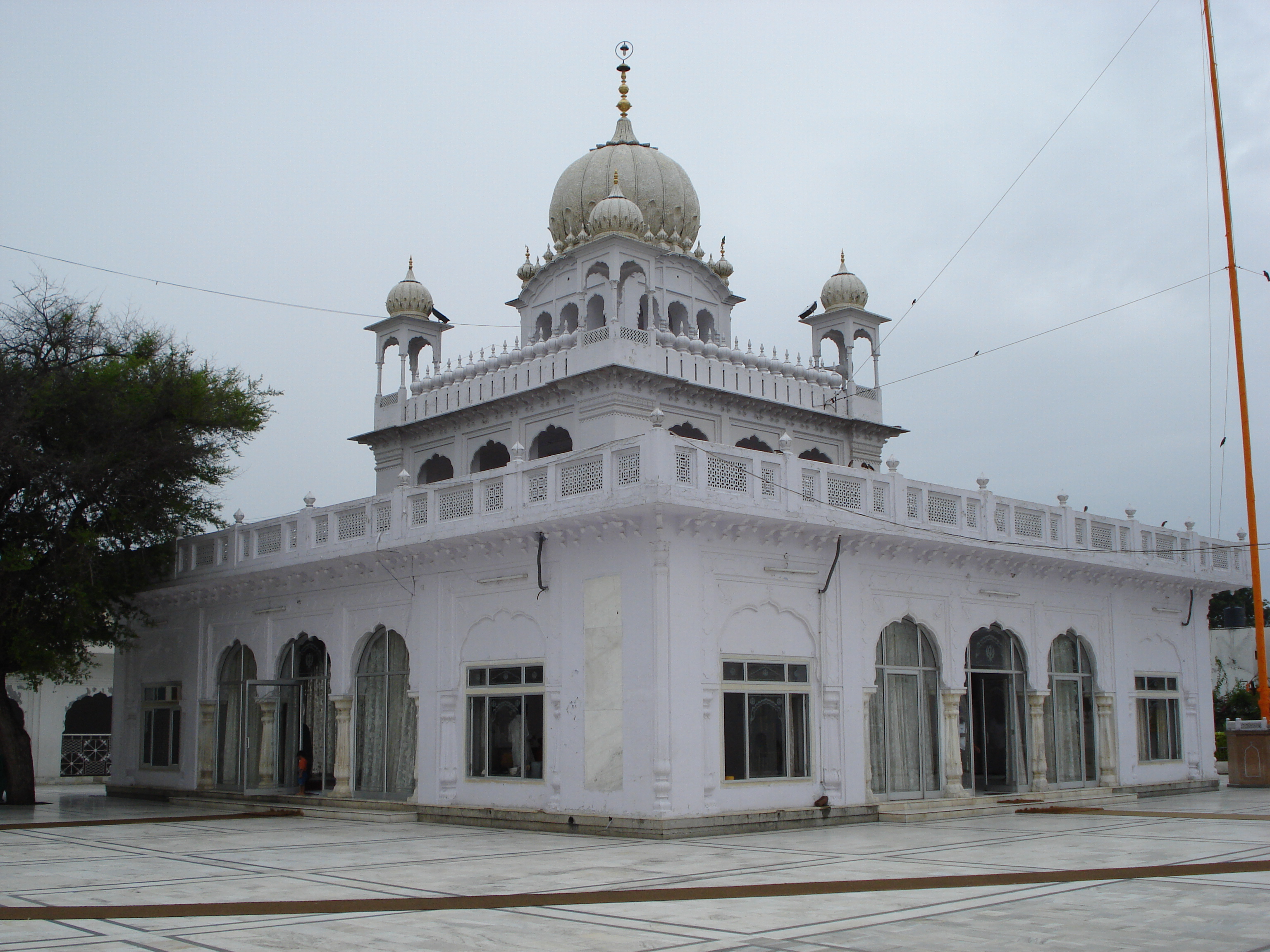
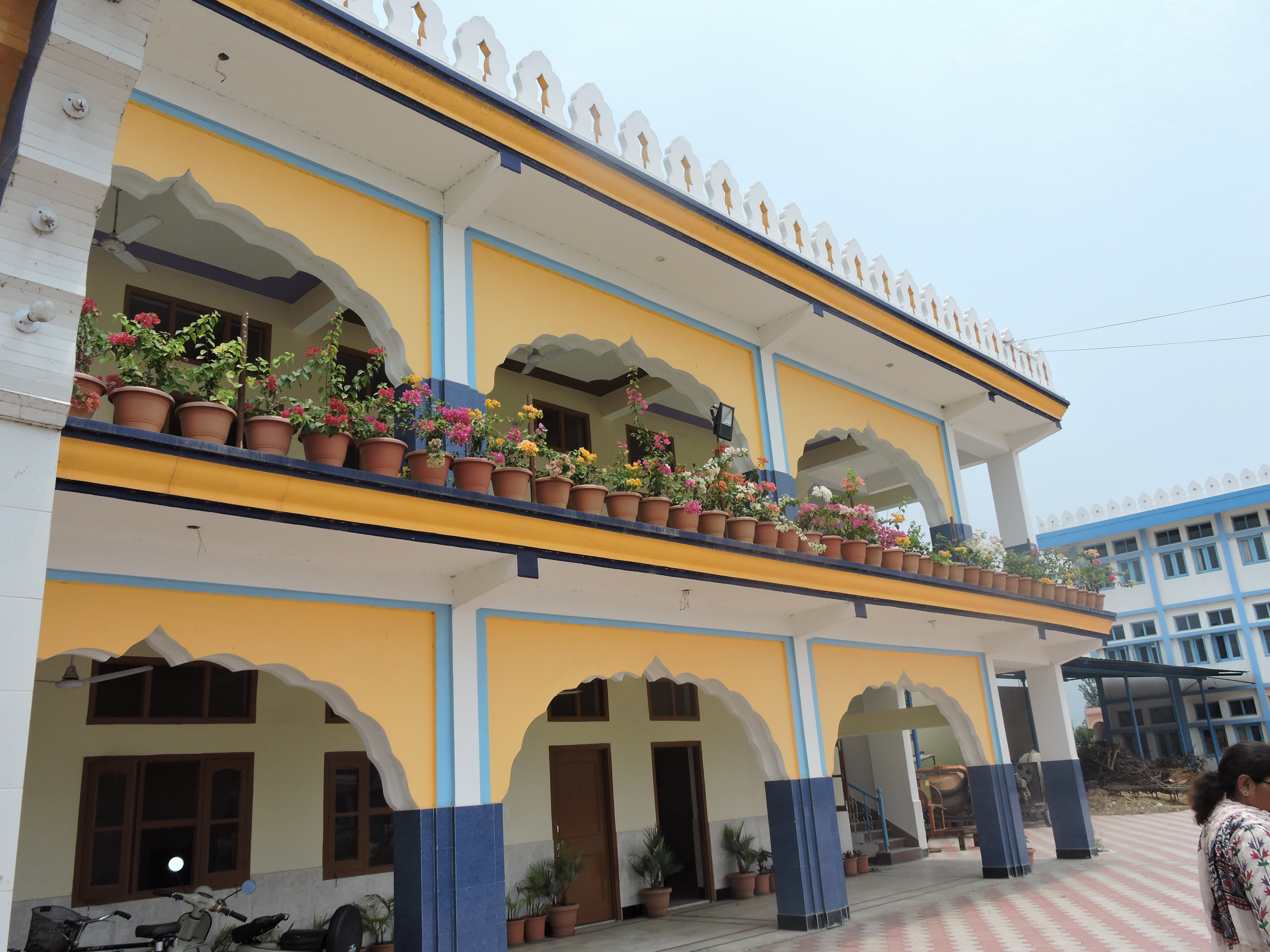
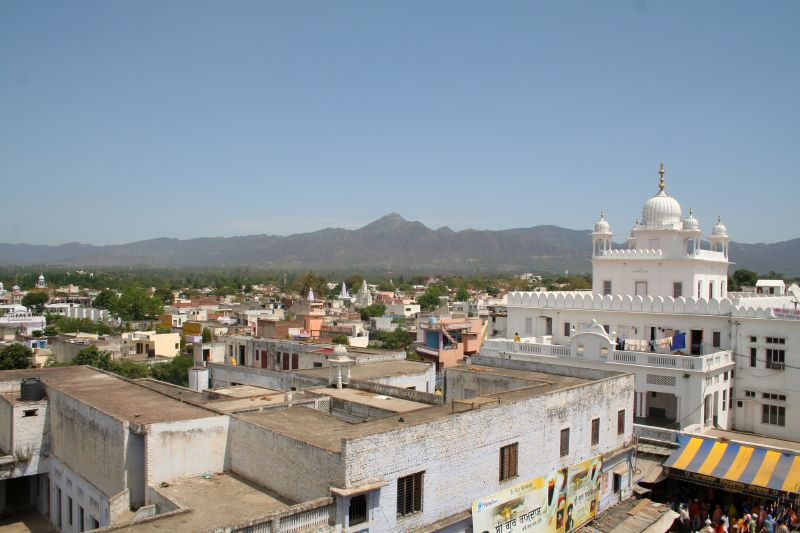
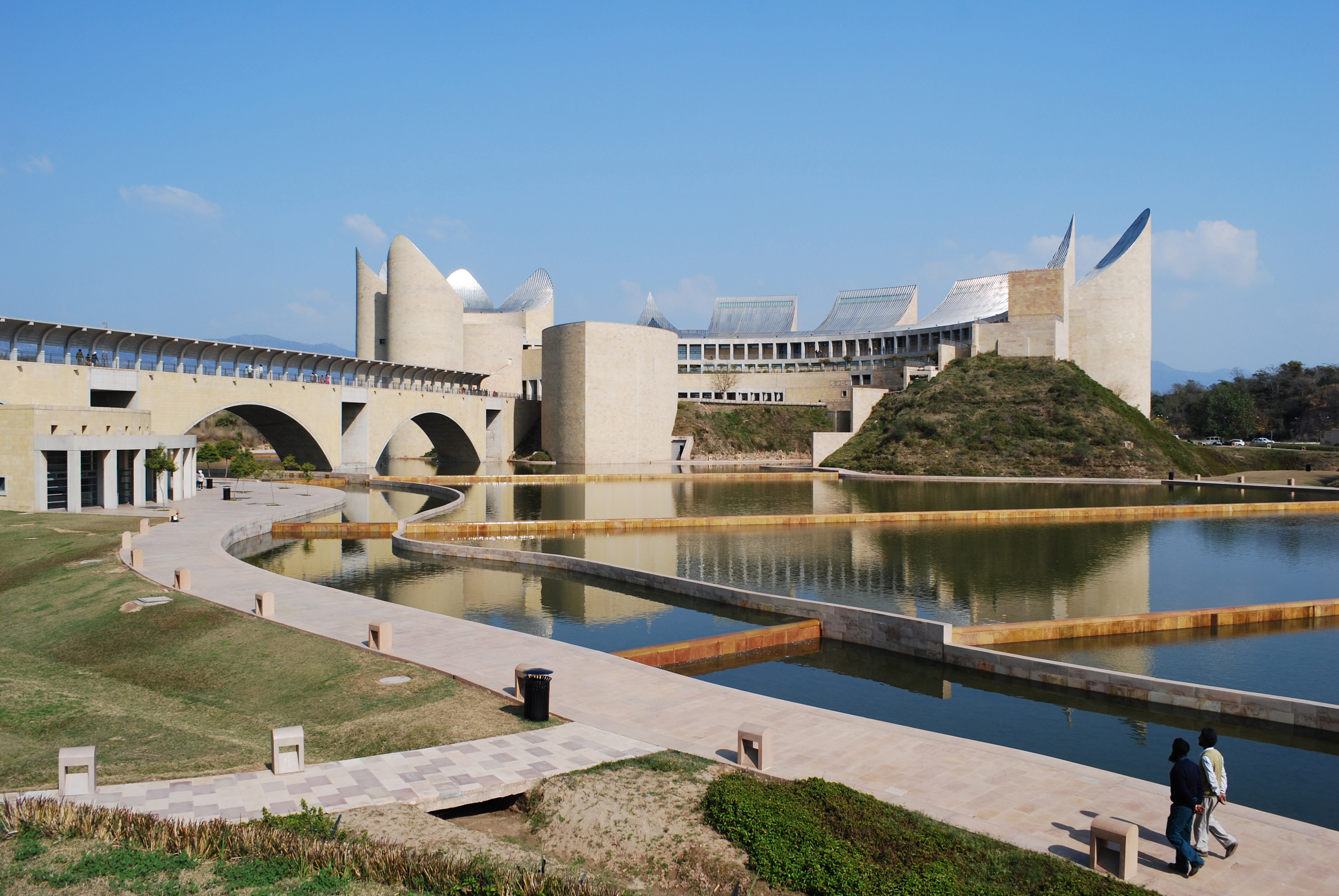
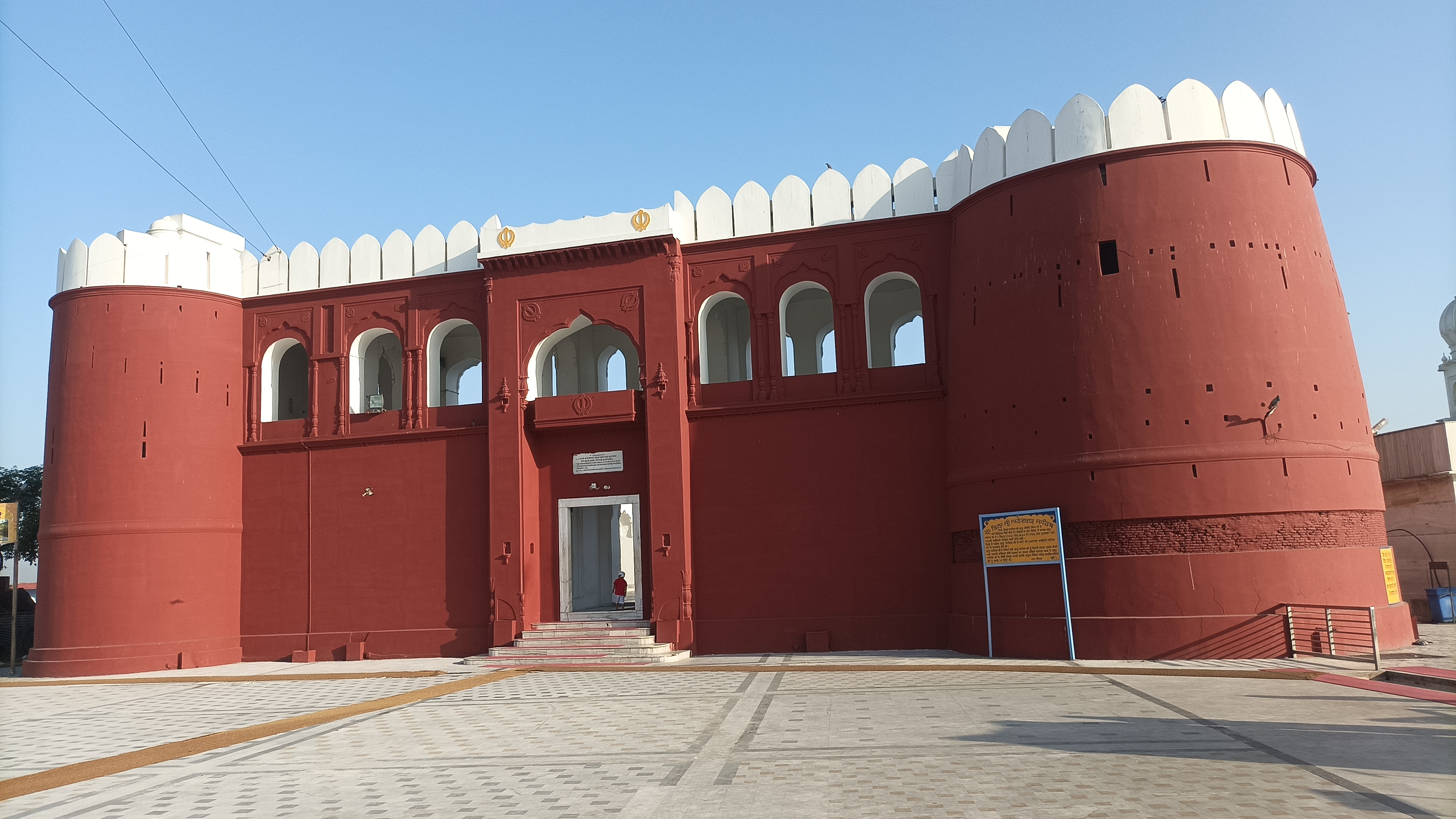
- Takht Kesgarh Sahib Gurdwara Sis Ganj Sahib Market place of dead Anandpur Skyline Virasat-e-Khalsa Gurdwara Qila Anandgarh Sahib
- Nickname: Chak Nanaki
- Interactive map of Sri Anandpur Sahib
- Coordinates: 31.234961°N 76.498808°E
- Country: India
- State: Punjab
- District: Rupnagar
- Established: 1665 CE
- Founder: Guru Tegh Bahadur

Government
  - MLA: Harjot Singh Bains (AAP)
  - MP: Malvinder Singh Kang (AAP)
- Elevation: 311 m (1,020 ft)

Population (2011)
  - Total: 16,282

Languages
  - Official: Punjabi
- Time zone: UTC+5:30 (IST)
- PIN: 140118
- 01887: 91-1887
- Vehicle registration: PB 16
- Nearest city: Kiratpur Sahib

Sri Anandpur Sahib, also referred simply as Anandpur (lit. 'city of bliss'), is a city in Rupnagar district (Ropar), on the edge of Shivalik Hills, in the Indian state of Punjab. Located near the Sutlej River, the city is one of the most sacred religious places in Sikhism, being the place where the last two Sikh Gurus, Guru Tegh Bahadur and Guru Gobind Singh, lived. It is also the place where Guru Gobind Singh founded the Khalsa Panth in 1699. The city is home to Takht Sri Kesgarh Sahib, the third of the five Takhts in Sikhism. The town was founded by the ninth Sikh guru, Guru Tegh Bahadur.

The city is a pilgrimage site in Sikhism. It is the venue of the largest annual Sikh gathering and festivities during the Hola Mohalla in the spring season. The Virasat-e-Khalsa museum is located in the city.

== Location ==
Anandpur Sahib is located on National Highway 503 that links Kiratpur Sahib and Chandigarh to Nangal, Una and further Kangra, Himachal Pradesh. It is situated near the Sutlej river, the longest of the five rivers that flow through the historic crossroads region of Punjab.

== History ==
=== Sikh gurus ===
Sri Anandpur Sahib is important in Sikh history for its relation to two Sikh gurus, Guru Tegh Bahadur and Guru Gobind Singh. Anandpur Sahib was founded in June 1665 by the ninth Sikh Guru, Guru Tegh Bahadur. Gurinder Singh Mann states that Guru Tegh Bahadur established Anandpur in 1664. He previously lived in Kiratpur, but given the disputes with Ram Rai – the elder son of Guru Har Rai and other sects of Sikhism, he moved to village in Makhoval. He named it Chakk Nanaki after his mother, and it became a prominent Dharamshal (Gurdwara plus self-sufficient village), consisting of tent encampments, vernacular clay/adobe straw-thatched round hutments ("Bunga") and small orchards and gardens in between the heavily forested hilly area and besides a stream and waterfall, (located in the area currently marked by Gurdwara Bhora Sahib). In 1675, Guru Tegh Bahadur was tortured and beheaded for refusing to convert to Islam under the orders of the Mughal Emperor Aurangzeb, a martyrdom that led Sikhs to rename the town to Anandpur and crown his son Gobind Das as per his orders (also known as Gobind Rai) as his successor and famous as Guru Gobind Singh.

The village grew larger (with more temporary encampments), state Louis E. Fenech and W. H. McLeod, as Sikhs moved near Guru Gobind Singh. Guru Gobind Singh founded nearby Paonta Sahib in 1685 as a secondary base for the Sikhs. The growing strength of Sikhs in Anandpur under the tenth Guru, after the execution of the ninth Guru, raised concerns of the neighboring Pahari rajas - the vassals of the Mughal Empire, along with the Mughal ruler Aurangzeb. In 1693, Aurangzeb issued an order that banned large gatherings of Sikhs such as during the festival of Baisakhi. At Anandpur, Guru Gobind Singh organized a court of poets, known as a Kavi Darbar, with 52 poets known as the Bavanja Kavi.

On the Vaisakhi day of 1699, the Guru sent out invitations across the land to distant and nearby Sikh congregations to convene at Anandpur for the upcoming festival. It was normal for the Guru to celebrate Vaisakhi at Anandpur with Sikh congregations annually but this time much more importance was placed on attendance than usual and more stringently. Guru Gobind Singh founded the Khalsa Panth in Anandpur on the day of the 1699 Vaisakhi festival after an elaborate ceremony and gathered a large armed militia. This triggered Aurangzeb and his vassal Hindu kings around Anandpur to blockade Anandpur. This led to several battles:

- First Battle of Anandpur (1700), against the Mughal army of Aurangzeb, who had sent 10,000 soldiers under the command of Painda Khan and Dina Beg. In a direct combat between Guru Gobind Singh and Painda Khan, the latter was killed. His death led to the Mughal army fleeing the battlefield.
- Second Battle of Anandpur (1704), against the Mughal army led first by Saiyad Khan and then by Ramjan Khan; The Mughal general was fatally wounded by Sikh soldiers, and the army withdrew. Aurangzeb then sent a larger army with two generals, Wazir Khan and Zaberdast Khan in May 1704, to destroy the Sikh resistance. The approach the Mughal army took in this battle was to lay a protracted siege against Anandpur, from May to December, cutting off all food and other supplies moving in and out, along with repeated battles. Some Sikh men deserted the Guru during Anandpur siege in 1704, and escaped to their homes where their women shamed them and they rejoined the Guru's army and died fighting with him in 1705. Towards the end, the Guru, his family and followers accepted an offer by Aurangzeb of safe passage out of Anandpur. However, as they left Anandpur in two batches, they were attacked, and one of the batches with Mata Gujari and Guru's two sons – Zorawar Singh aged 8 and Fateh Singh aged 5 – were taken captive by the Mughal army. Both his children were executed by burying them alive into a wall. The grandmother Mata Gujari died there as well.

According to Louis Fenech, Anandpur's history during the late 17th century and early 18th century was complex and war prone because the relationship of Guru Gobind Singh with his neighbors was complex. Sometimes the hill chiefs and Guru Gobind Singh cooperated in a battle, sometimes they fought against each other, where the difficult mountainous terrain made it difficult for the Mughal to subdue everyone with force and the terrain made it easier for Pahari chieftains to rebel against the Mughals routinely.

=== Post-Sikh evacuation ===
The Sikhs evacuated from Anandpur. As per Roopinder Singh, control over the city came into the possession of the Raja of Bilaspur but was later purchased by the cousins of Guru Gobind Singh. After the city was sacked in 1704, its control passed into the hands of Budh Singh, a disciple of Guru Gobind Singh. Budh Singh later handed over control of the city over to Patiala State under the reign of Ala Singh. In 1764, the descendent of Sodhi Suraj Mal (one of the sons of Guru Hargobind), Nahar Singh, purchased the city plus a fort called Manji Sahib (which was a dwelling associated with Suraj Mal). As more Sodhi families moved into the city, four Sarkars were established, with them namely being: Badi, Dusri, Tisri, and Chauthi. The Badi sarkar was the most eminent of the four yet all of them were revered by the Sikh population of the era. Each sarkar had its own associated palace that was fortified, commune, and congregation of followers. The sarkars also maintained a militia of their own, consisting of infantry, cavalary, and elephants.

=== Colonial period ===
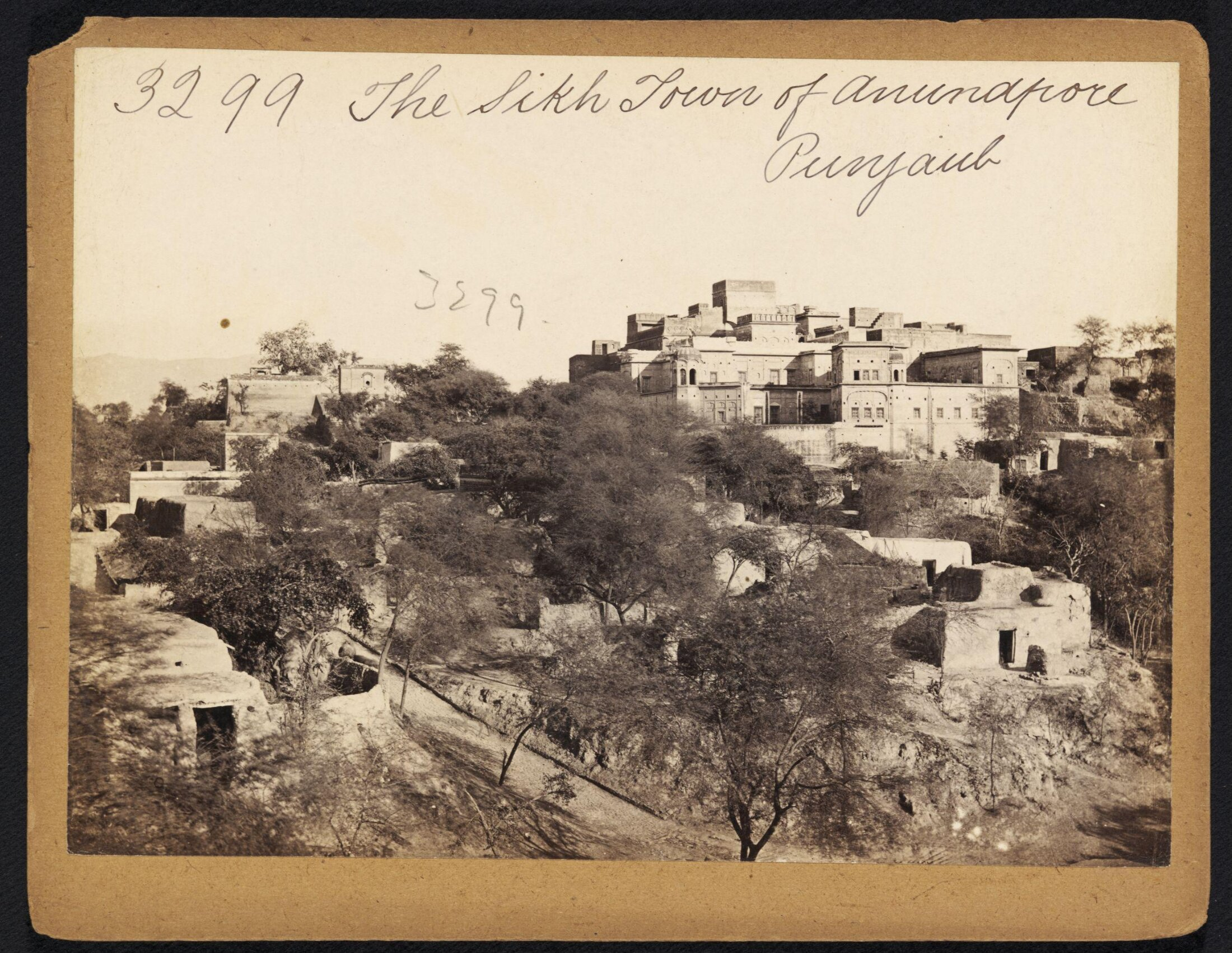
"The Sikh Town of Anundpore. Punjaub" photograph by Francis Firth, ca.1850's–1870's

In the late 19th century, a descendant of the Sikh gurus named Sodhi Kishan Singh transformed Anandpur Sahib into a municipal committee. Control over the locality's Sikh shrines was given to the newly-formed Shiromani Gurdwara Parbandhak Committee in 1923.

=== Post-independence ===
Giani Zail Singh's Guru Gobind Singh Marg project in 1973 made the Vaisakhi and Hola Maholla celebrations at Anandpur more popular with Sikh pilgrims and led to the build-up of infrastructure to accommodate the increasing crowds. That same year, the Anandpur Sahib Resolution invoked the name of the city. The Singh Sabha Shatabdi Committee of Hukam Singh and Giani Gurdit Singh helped popularize Anandpur as a place to celebrate Vaisakhi. In 1999, the entire city was painted white to mark the tricentenary of the Khalsa.

==== 21st century ====
The 1999 tricentenrary celebration was also marked by the announcement of a planned Virasat-e-Khalsa museum by Parkash Singh Badal, which opened in 2011. Virasat-e-Khalsa Museum campus links, particularly with the need of the population, providing business to the locals and makes the city marked on urban literature globally. Punjab Heritage Tourism Promotion Board paid to have it installed in order to attract worldwide tourism. Open spaces which are going to be used by ritual activities during ceremonies and festivals also serve as alternative parking grounds, reserved grounds for political rallies which brings the intact ingredient of Indian cities together “The Interaction”.

There have been recent demands for an Anandpur Sahib district.

== Heritage conservation ==
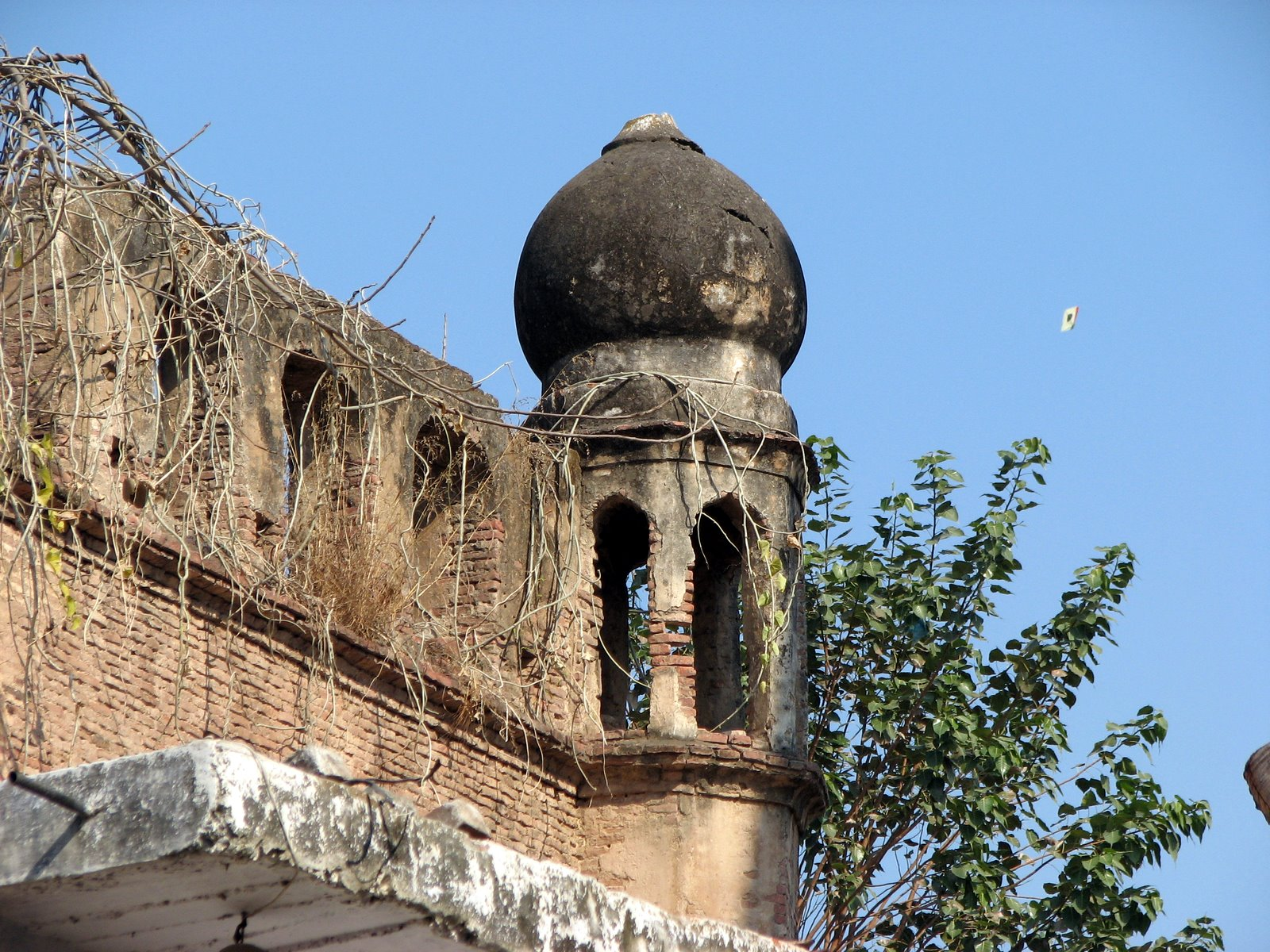
Photograph of wall-fortification ruins of Anandpur Sahib, Punjab, by Jasleen Kaur, 15 January 2007

Historical sites and structures in the city have been poorly maintained and the vast majority have been destroyed. Buildings, such as forts, that are associated with the lives of the Sikh gurus have been demolished and renovated beyond recognition, including the Anandgarh Baoli. Much of this defacement involves encasing historical structures in marble. Though the locality once was littered with various forts, these have been destroyed over the years as the city has expanded and changed. In the mid-1930's, the gurdwara structure of Takht Kesgarh Sahib was rebuilt. In the 1930s, a new structure was constructed over the original site and structure of Anandgarh Qila. By 1988, essentially all of the principal standing shrines of Anandpur Sahib had been reconstructed at some point in either the late 19th or early 20th centuries during the Singh Sabha movement, based upon older edifices that stood at their spot. There were formerly mural paintings and floral embellishments decorating the walls of Gurdwara Akal Bunga but these are no longer extant, though surviving traces of these wall paintings could be seen on the wall skirting the roof of the structure. Qila Sodhian was the last surviving remnant of a fortification in Anandpur Sahib in the year 1999.

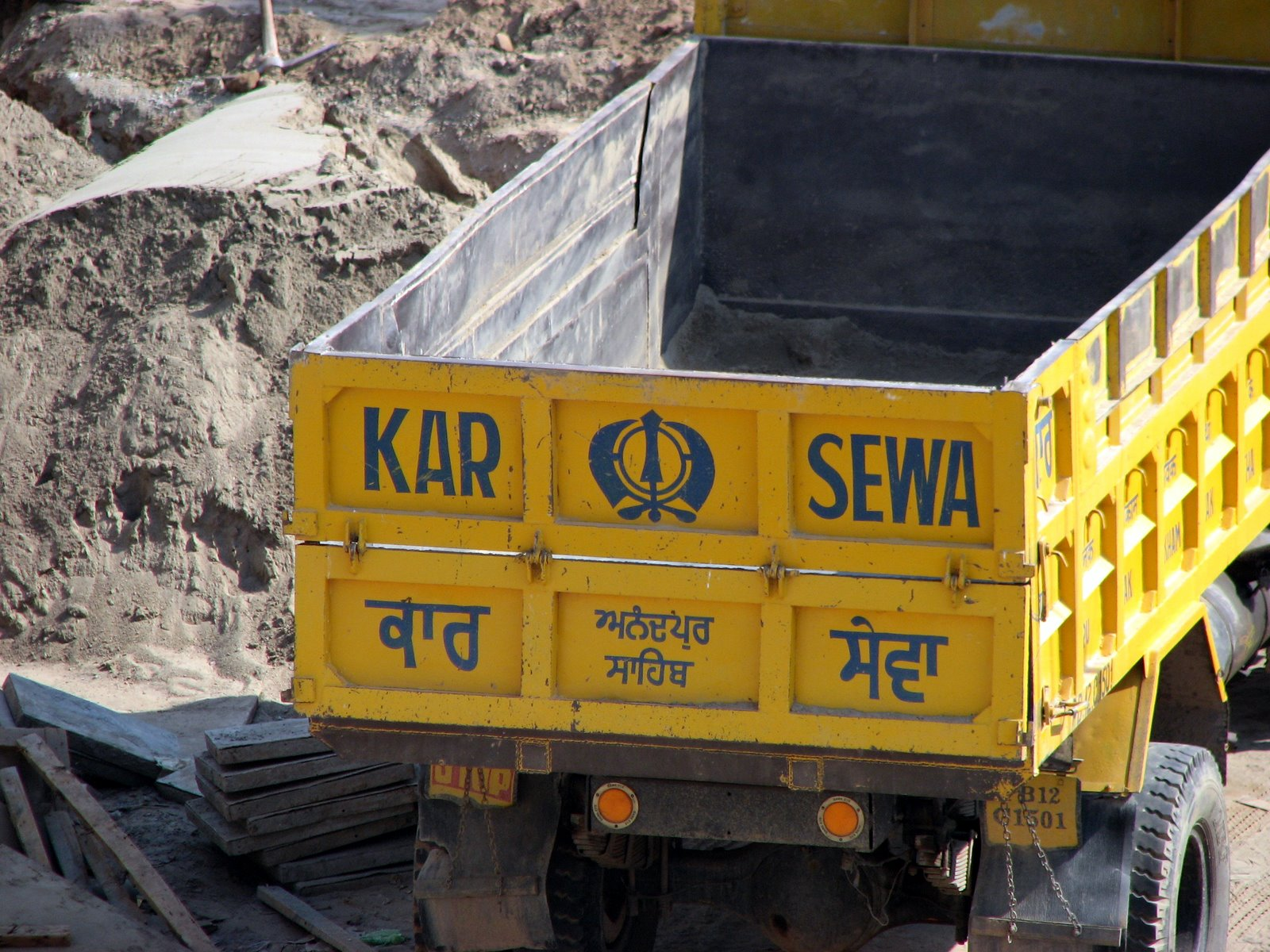
Photograph of a Kar Sewa truck for the purpose of constructing a new gurdwara at Anandpur Sahib, by Jasleen Kaur, 15 January 2007

The original vernacular heritage structures and monuments that are associated with the lives of the Sikh Gurus have long been demolished and replaced with new buildings inspired by Mughal or modern Architecture- no original heritage remains from the 17th century, and very little from the 19th. As per Nihang oral history, the original Chak Nanaki and Akal Bunga (vernacular clay round hutments) were demolished in the Ranjit Singh era and replaced with a new Gurdwara complex, a large palace was constructed on the hilltop which was previously an open site of worship, and the small lookout posts in the hillsides (referred to as "Quila"- Fort in vernacular Nihang vocabulary) were replaced with towering Mughal-architecture forts, to display the new wealth and prestige of Empire. A photograph taken in 1865 by journalists from the Francis Frith Studios, shows the new palatial building on the hilltop; with some abandoned early 18th century clay structures still present around it. In the 1900s, these few remaining vernacular clay structures were demolished, jungles cut down, the hills and ravines flattened and replaced with houses, markets and roads for the growing populace. In the 1930s and 40s, post the Singh Sabha Gurdwara Reform, the 19th century buildings and forts, including the Anandgarh Baoli were either demolished or defaced beyond recognition, through encasing historical structures in marble. The 19th century Keshgarh hill-top palace was demolished in its entirety and replaced with an entirely new structure [Takht Kesgarh Sahib]. Qila Taragarh was constructed on the sacred hilltop where 500 holy saints meditated- replacing the rock mound, garden and Nishan Sahib that was previously stood there. There reconstructions were based upon older edifices that stood at their spot, and with none of the natural hill and ravine ecology remaining; which had quintessentially defined the area during the Gurus era. The steep natural stone steps descending down to a spring from Qila Anandgarh, graced by the Gurus footsteps, was demolished and replaced with a brick and concrete stairway and the original spring removed and replaced with a generic Gurdwara. The holy Bhora (natural rock ledge) on which Guru Tegh Bahadur used to sit and meditate besides a stream, was preserved in the basement of the newly built Bhora Sahib Gurdwara, but this too was demolished and the basement fully encased in marble in the 2000s at the behest of the controversial "Kar Seva" modernisation drive. The only remaining built heritage in 2025 is a small section of 19th century Nanakshahi (narrow) red brick on display behind a glass panel within the newly constructed Qila Anangarh Sahib. There are also some sections of ruins of a 19th-century Sodhi clan Haveli in the back alleys of the Old Market. Today, Anandpur Sahib is a growing city and popular place of pilgrimage, but without any cultural or natural heritage. The emphasis has been for modern architecture and religious symbolism in the urban landscape: from the prominent 81-foot-high stainless steel Khanda in the Khalsa Park to the sprawling modern concrete and steel Virasat-e-Khalsa museum, designed by the Israeli architect Moshe Safdie, commissioned in 1999 by the then Chief Minister Prakash Singh Badal, who was inspired by the similarly modern Yad Vashem holocaust memorial. The dynamic interplay between the city's significance as a spiritual center and relentless modernization juxtaposes and reveals the struggle of the post-colonial Sikh identity, that is still unfurling.

An organization focused on Anandpuri heritage is the Anandpur Sahib Heritage Foundation of Sodhi Vikram Singh.

== Landmarks ==
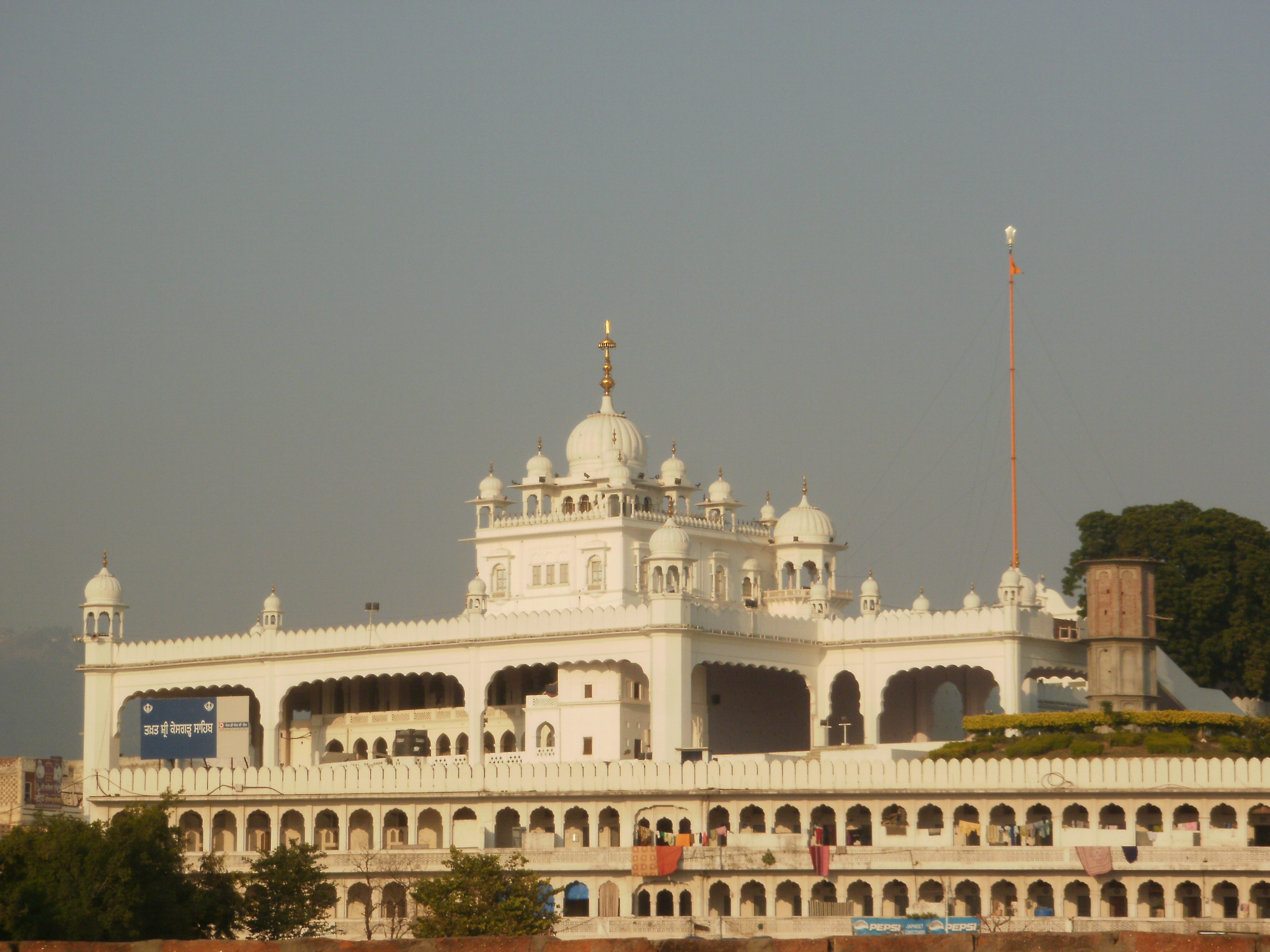
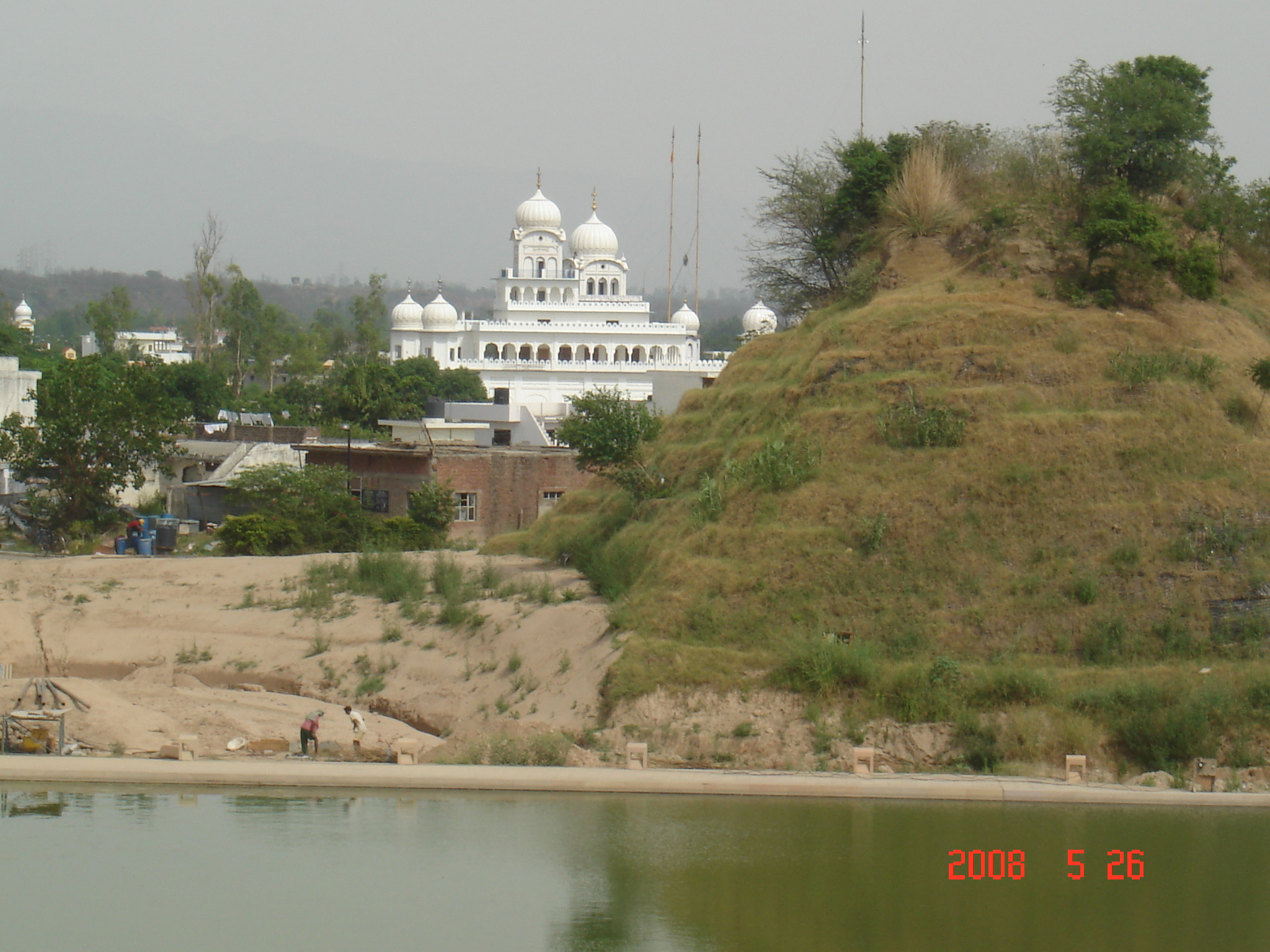
Gurdwaras in Anandpur Sahib

Elements convening definitions of the city Anandpur Sahib are: Heterogeneous societies and discrete buildings as economic and administrative, social, institutional, political, neighborhoods and associated personnel, compacted and overlapped packing of residential and nonresidential structures, monumental core of unique buildings (for example, Keshgarh Sahib Gurudwara, bus stand structure), Five Forts of city and Khalsa Heritage Museum, special characteristic features “City profile” of Anandpur Sahib that shows maximum building height at the centre of the city and less height as one moves away from the city centre, central focus the enshrined centre, whose access was restricted and where Gurudwaras predominated.

=== Gurdwaras ===
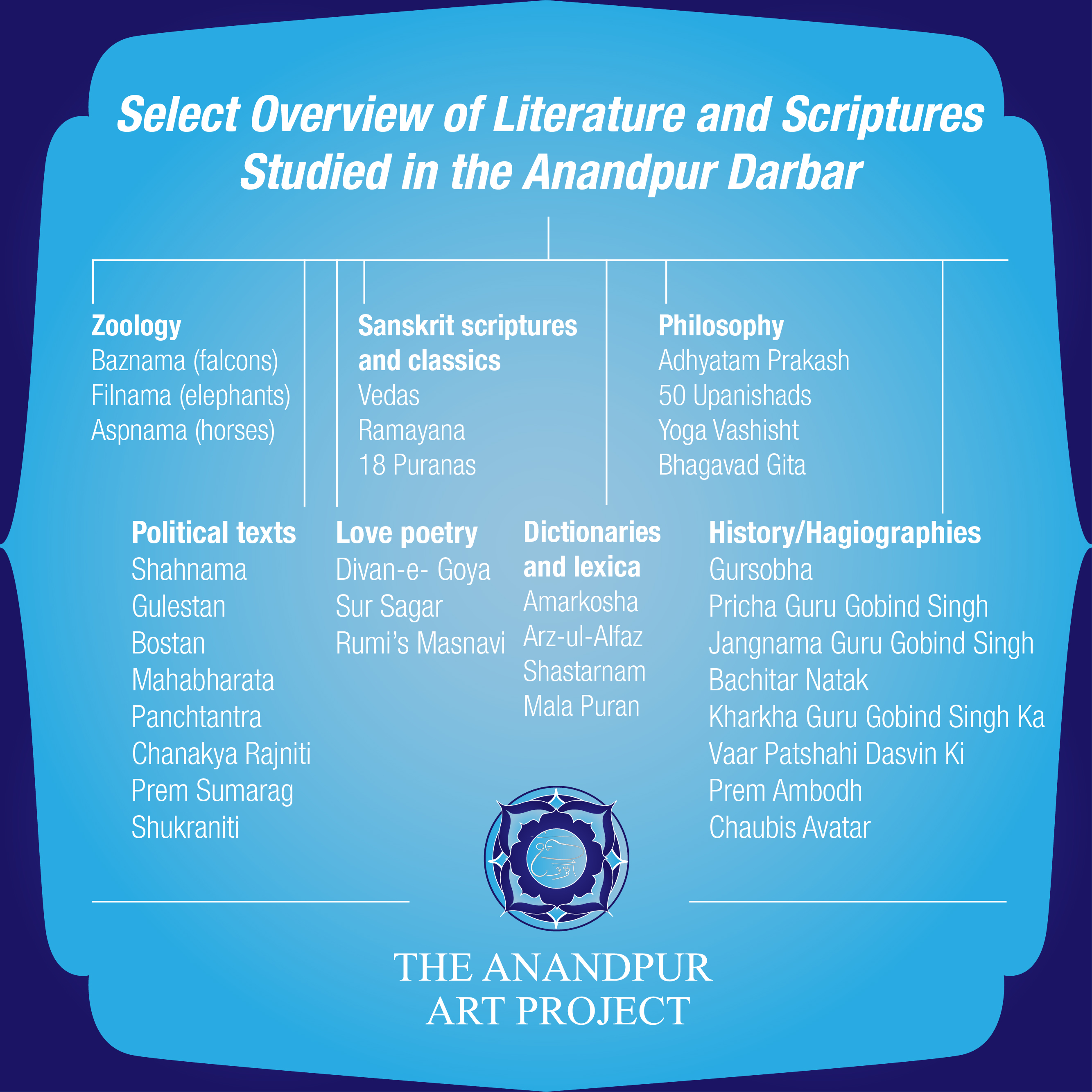
Select overview of literature and scriptures studied in the Anandpur Darbar during Guru Gobind Singh's time (The Anandpur Art Project)

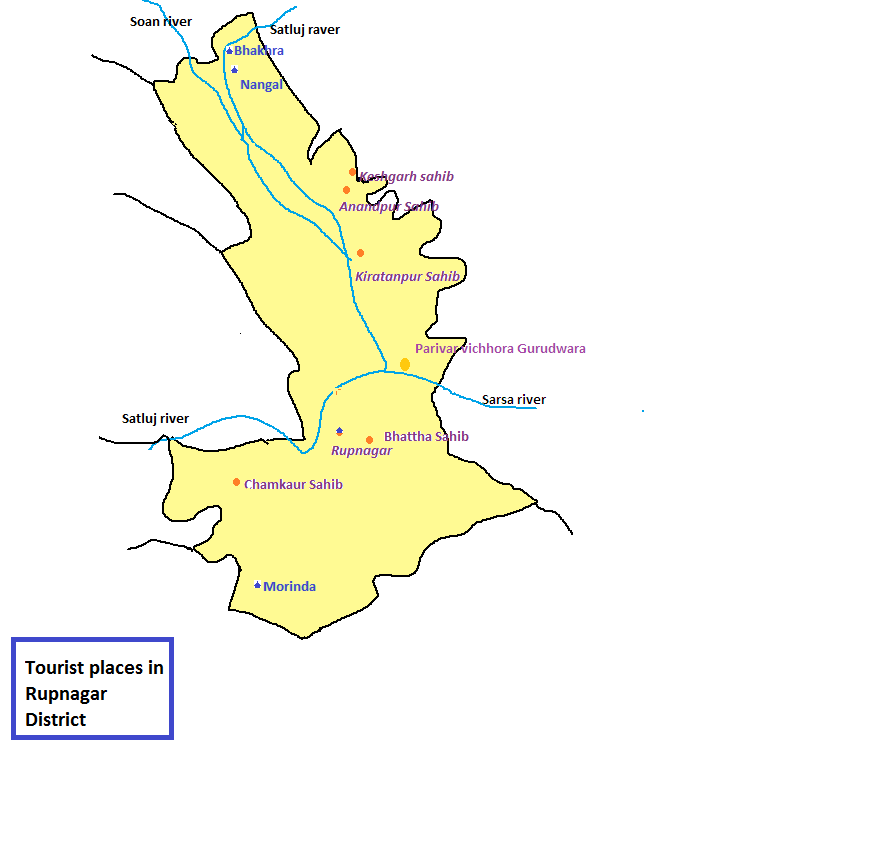
Location of Anandpur Sahib in the map of Rupnagar District

Anandpur Sahib is in Punjab state of India, close to the Himachal Pradesh border. It is about 31 kilometres (19 mi) north of Ropar (Rupnagar) and 29 kilometres (18 mi) south of Nangal. The gurdwaras of Anandpur are classified as historical since they are connected to the Sikh gurus or other aspects related to the history of Sikhism. The architecture of the Sikh shrines of Anandpur have commonalities in their themes but also have unique quirks and aspects to their design that do set them apart from each-other. Anandpur has been significant to the Sikh history. These historical locations now feature the following gurdwaras:

- Gurudwara Takht Sri Kesgarh Sahib: is the principal Sikh temple in the town. It marks the birthplace of Khalsa and one of the five religious authorities (Five Takhts) of Sikhism. Standing on a hillock, the present complex was built between 1936 and 1944. The plan of the building is a square set inside a 30 square metres (320 sq ft) square courtyard. The building has been renovated many times throughout the years. In it are the Takht's office and a Gurdwara. The Gurdwara has a 16 square metres (170 sq ft) square hall, inside which is 5.5 square metres (59 sq ft) square sanctum with the Sikh scripture and old weapons used by Guru Gobind Singh's Khalsa, signifying the miri and piri aspects of the Sikh faith. The dome of the Gurdwara is fluted lotus. The lower levels of the complex has a langar (free community kitchen run by volunteers), a 55 square metres (590 sq ft) square divan hall, and a row of rooms for pilgrims called the Dashmesh Nivas. Nearby is an 80 square metres (860 sq ft) square sarovar (holy water tank) for pilgrims to take their pilgrimage dip.
- Gurdwara Sisganj: built by Ranjit Singh to mark the place where Guru Tegh Bahadur's severed head after his execution in Delhi, was cremated in 1675. Guru Gobind Singh had a platform and shrine built on the site of the cremation. He entrusted an Udasi Sikh named Gurbakhsh to protect this shrine when he left Anandpur in 1705. The Gurdwara was enlarged and renovated in the 1970s. This Sikh temple features a pinnacled dome under which is the sanctum. Around the sanctum is a 4.5 metres (15 ft) wide circumambulation path with carved marble pillars.
- Gurudwara Bhora Sahib: A three-storey domed Gurdwara which was the residence of Guru Teg Bahadur. The basement level has a room with a 1.5 square metres (16 sq ft) platform that is 0.5 metres (1 ft 8 in) high, where the 9th Guru used to meditate and compose hymns. It now houses the Guru Granth Sahib.
- Gurudwara Thara Sahib: A 5 square metres (54 sq ft) platform in the front of Damdama Sahib where Bhai Kripa Ram Dutt along with other 16 Kashmiri Pandits sought his help in 1675. They came to seek protection from Aurangzeb and requested Guru Teg Bahadur to save them from forcible conversions to Islam.
- Gurudwara Akal Bunga Sahib: This Gurdwara is opposite to Gurdwara Sis Ganj Sahib. It was built by a pujari named Man Singh in 1889. Here Guru Gobind Singh after the cremation of the "head of Guru Teg Bahadur" had delivered a sermon after the beheading of his father Guru Teg Bahadur in Delhi.
- Gurudwara Damdama Sahib: Close to Gurdwara Sisganj Sahib, it shares the compound with Anandpur Bhora Sahib and Thara Sahib, which is also called Guru ke Mahal. This Gurdwara remembers the residential quarters of Guru Tegh Bahadur. He used to welcome and counsel Sikh sangats who would visit him. Guru Gobind Singh was designated as the tenth guru at this place. The octagonal domed building here was built in 20th century.
- Gurudwara Manji Sahib / Gurudwara Dumalgarh Sahib: This Gurdwara is on the northern side of Takht Shri Keshgarh Sahib. Here, Guru Gobind Singh used to train his sons. This place was used as playground; wrestling and other competitions were held here. It was also the former residence of Sodhi Suraj Mal, son of Guru Hargobind.
- Gurdwara Shaeedhi Bagh: This Gurdwara is located on the road between Takhat Shri Kesh Garh Sahib & Kila Anand Garh Sahib. In early days of eighteenth century this place was a big garden during skirmishes between Sikh Army and Bilaspur Army, many Sikh soldiers laid their lives here in this garden, hence this place is termed as Gurdwara Shaeedhi Bagh.
- Gurdwara Mata Jit Kaur / Gurdwara Mata Jito Ji: Mata Jit Kaur, wife of Guru Gobind Singh had a vision "Divya-drishti" of the atrocities and cruelties on Sikhs and young sons. She was cremated near Quilla Holgarh Sahib. This place is now termed Gurdwara Mata Jit Kaur.
- Gurdwara Guru Ka Mahal: It was the first building of Chak Nanaki, Anandpur Sahib. The foundation stone was laid here. Guru Gobind Singh, Mata Gujri, Mata Jit Kaur, Mata Sundar Kaur, Mata Sahib Kaur and four sons of the Guru had been living here: Jujhar Singh, Zorawar Singh and Fateh Singh were born here. Gurdwara Bhora Sahib, Gurdwara Manji Sahib and Gurdwara Damdama Sahib are part of Gurdwara Guru Ka Mahal Complex.

=== Forts ===
10th Sikh Guru Guru Gobind Singh made five forts on the border of the city. The buildings to commemorate each of these were built between late 1970s and the late 1980s:

- Qila Anandgarh Sahib: This was the main fort, after which the city was also named Anandpur Sahib. The Army once resided here.
- Qila Holgarh Sahib: Here Holla Mohalla was celebrated.
- Qila Lohgarh Sahib: Here the weapons for the Army were made.
- Qila Fatehgarh Sahib: Fateh Singh was born here hence the name.
- Qila Taragarh Sahib: This fort was made to stop the hill armies.

=== Sacred sites near Anandpur Sahib ===
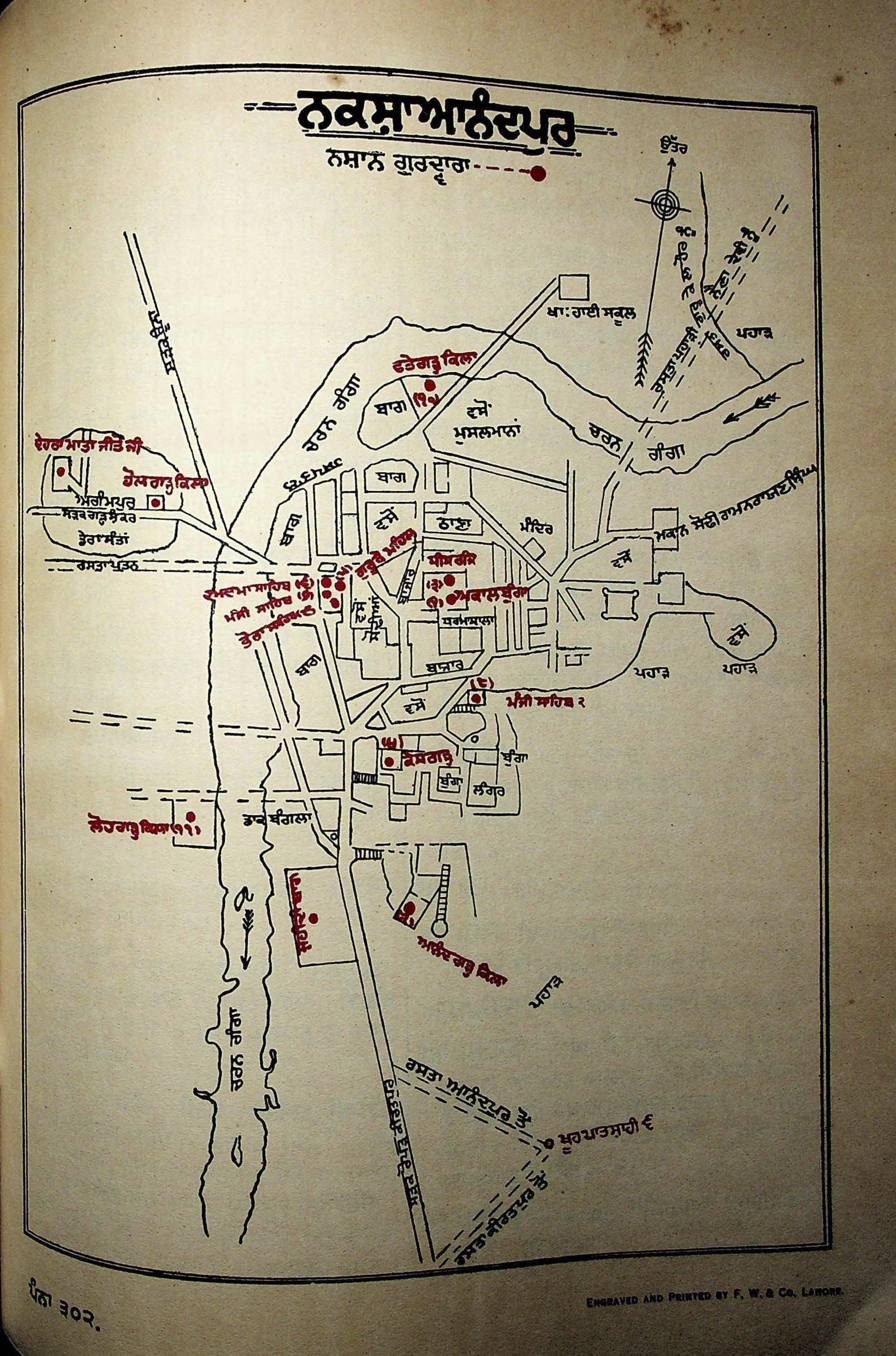
- Map of Anandpur Sahib with the locations of Sikh sites labelled, as published in the Mahan Kosh (1930)
  Guru-Ka-Lahore: It is situated about 11 km on Sri Anandpur Sahib-Ganguwal route leading to the state of Himachal Pradesh, India. On 25 January 1686, the 10th Guru's wedding to Mata was celebrated here. Two trickling springs, claimed to be dug out from the stony mountain-side by the 10th Guru, still exist today.
- Bhai Kanhaiya : Bhai Kanhaiya offered first aid to friendly and enemy forces alike across the area spanning the now-almost dried up rivulet Charan Ganga and below the Taragarh hill. His unbiased service has been compared to the functions of the Red Cross.
- Shri Naina Devi ji : This temple is one of the oldest and holiest temple in Distt-Bilaspur, Himachal Pradesh. So many tourists visit here after going to Anandpur Sahib.It's about 20 km away from Anandpur Sahib and situated on Shivalik Range.
- Gurdwara Suhela Ghora Sahib : Gurdwara is situated in Pail village near the Anandpur Sahib City in Ropar District. This is a village now in ruins near Ganguval, 5 km north of Anandpur along Anandpur Guru ka Lahore road. The village still has a shrine commemorating Guru Hargobind's visit in 1635. Here one of his favourite stallions called Shhela, which was wounded in the Battle of Kartarpur, finally collapsed and died.
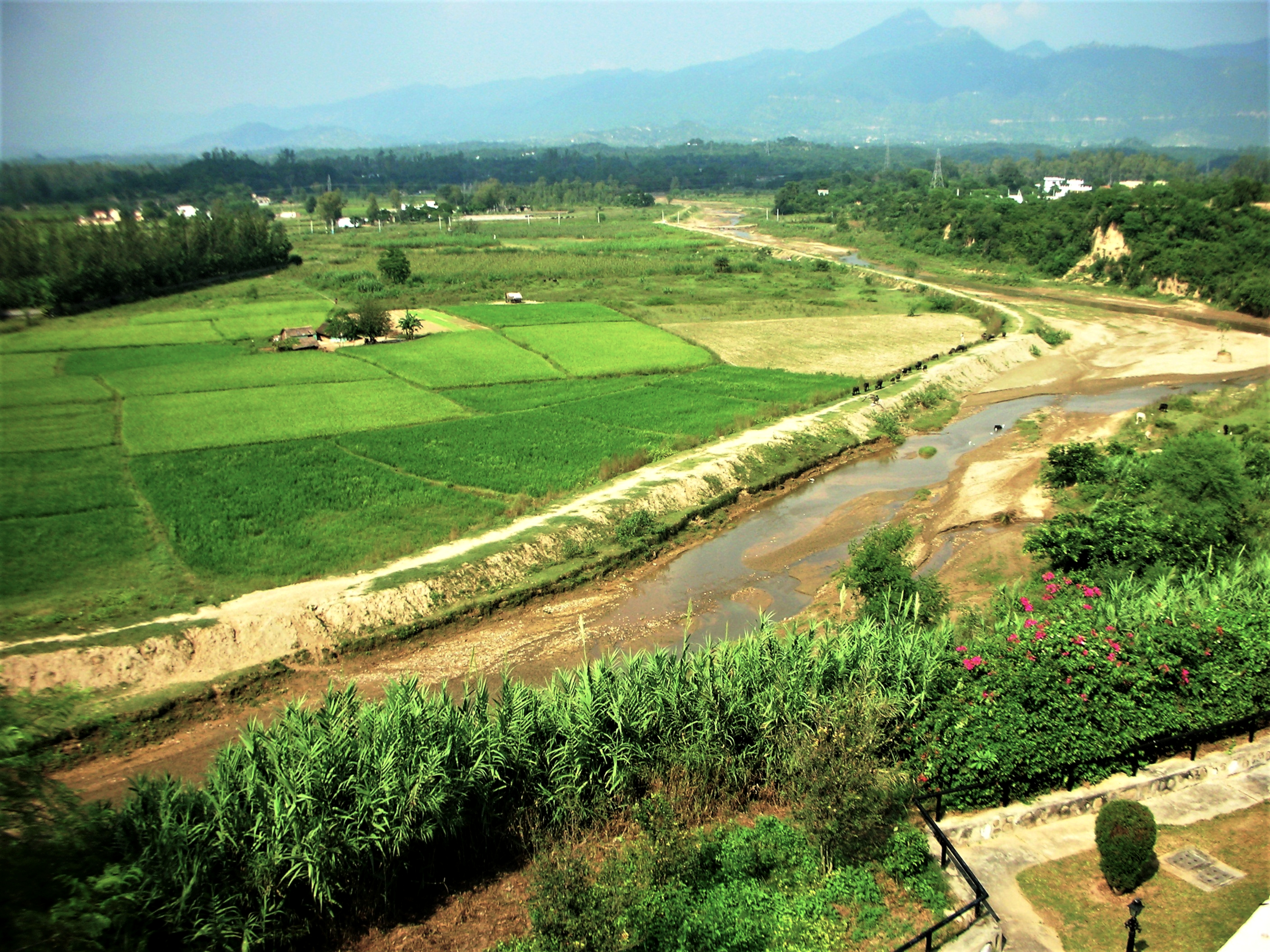
  Charan Ganga, Anandpur Sahib.

== Demographics ==
Religion in Anandpur Sahib
| Religion | Percent |
| Sikhism | 55.39% |
| Hinduism | 42.05% |
| Others | 2.56% |

As of 2011 India census, The Anandpur Sahib Municipal Council has population of 16,282 of which 8,545 are males while 7,737 are females as per report released by Census India 2011.

Population of children with age of 0-6 is 1774 which is 10.90% of total population of Anandpur Sahib (M Cl). In Anandpur Sahib Municipal Council, Female Sex Ratio is of 905 against state average of 895. Moreover, Child Sex Ratio in Anandpur Sahib is around 932 compared to Punjab state average of 846. Literacy rate of Anandpur Sahib city is 82.44% higher than state average of 75.84%. In Anandpur Sahib, Male literacy is around 85.75% while female literacy rate is 78.78%.

Anandpur Sahib Municipal Council has total administration over 3,270 houses to which it supplies basic amenities like water and sewerage. It is also authorized to build roads within Municipal Council limits and impose taxes on properties coming under its jurisdiction.

=== Villages ===
Villages administered by the tehsil of Anandpur Sahib include:

- Dasgrain
- Barari
- Bikapur
- Ganguwal
- Bassowal
- Sadhewal

== Festivals and fairs ==
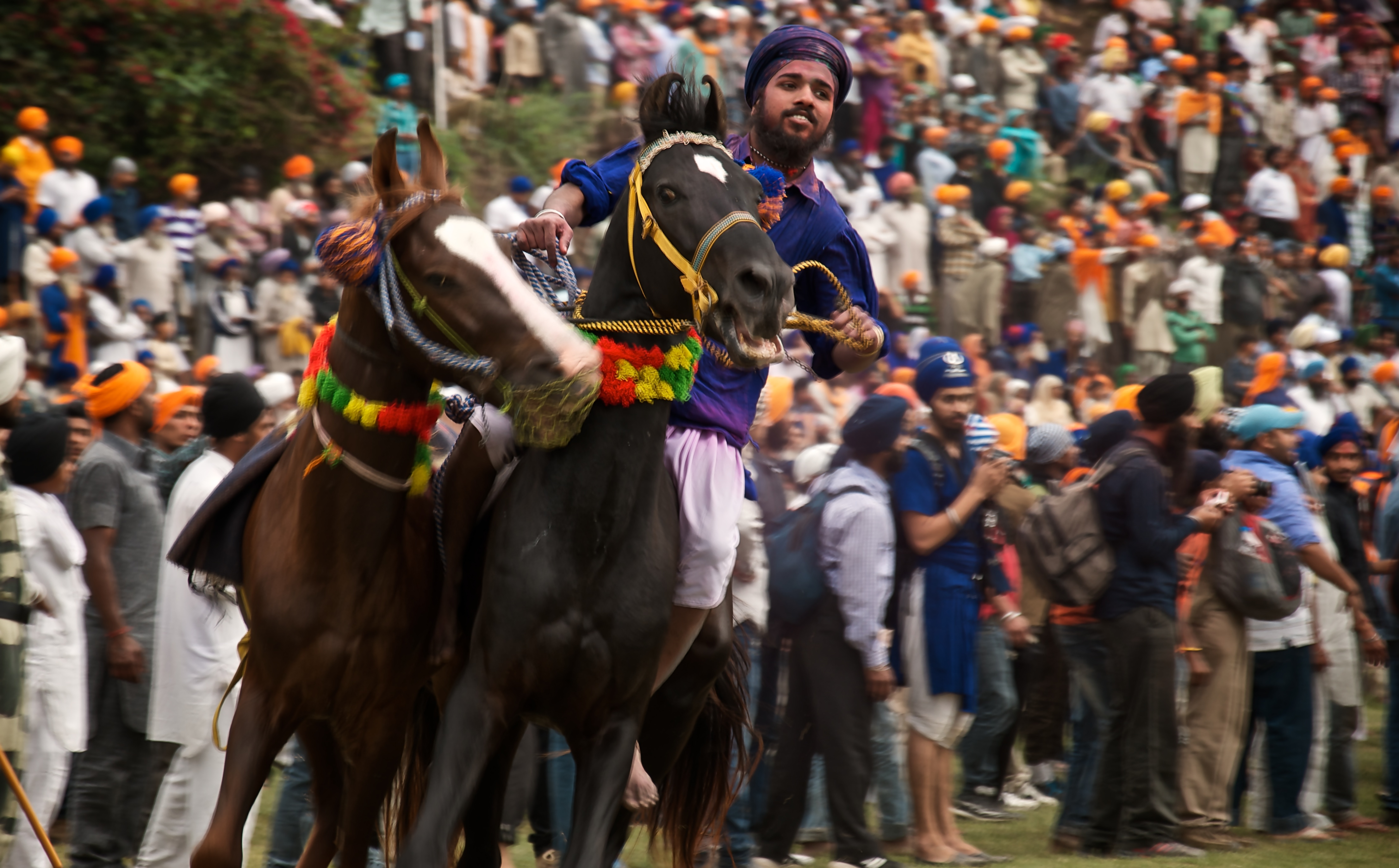
Anandpur Sahib is the site for the annual Hola Mohalla gathering and martial sports.

Anandpur Sahib hosts two important Sikh celebrations, namely Vaisakhi and Hola Mohalla. Anandpur Sahib features a major festival and gathering of Sikhs every year on the occasion of Hola Mohalla, which is celebrated one day prior to Holi. This tradition dates back to the times of the 10th Guru, Guru Gobind Singh. The guru decreed that the occasion of the festival of Holi be the occasion for the display of the martial spirit of his people. He gave this festival of Holi the Sikh name of 'Hola Mohalla'. Each year Hola Mohalla marks the congregation of nearly 20,00,000 (2,000,000) Sikhs from all over the country for a festival of colour and gaiety. The festival, among other things, remembers the creation of Khalsa on the Baisakhi day in 1699.

The fair lasts for three days. The Gurudwaras are specially decorated for the occasion. During Hola Mohalla, Anandpur Sahib wears a festive appearance and hums with activities in March. Community conferences and religious functions are also organized. On this occasion, Nihangs from all over the country gather for the celebrations. The highlight is a huge procession by the Nihangs, clad in their traditional dress and weapons, on the last day of the fair. The procession starts from the headquarters of the Nihangs, opposite Gurudwara Anandgarh Sahib, and passes through the bazaar, goes to village Agampur and reaches the fort of Holgarh, the place where Guru Gobind Singh used to celebrate this fair. Thereafter, the procession heads toward the sandy bed of Charan Ganga, where demonstration of martial games including riding, tent pegging, sword-wielding, etc. are witnessed by a large number of people.

Baisakhi in 1999, at Anandpur Sahib marked the completion of 300 years of the birth of the Khalsa. It was on Baisakhi day in 1699 that Guru Gobind Singh baptised the Panj Pyaras at the place where Takht Sri Keshgarh Sahib stands.

== Other places ==
- Khalsa Heritage Memorial Complex
- Sri Dasmesh Academy
- Naina Devi

The world's tallest khanda is installed at Sri Anandpur Sahib at Panj Piara Park with an estimated height of 70 feet.

== See also ==
- Sikhism
- Nankana Sahib
- Amritsar

== Bibliography ==
- Dilgeer, Dr Harjinder Singh (1998), Anandpur Sahib (Punjabi and Hindi), S.G.P.C.
- Dilgeer, Dr Harjinder Singh (2003), Anandpur Sahib (English and Punjabi), Sikh University Press.
- Dilgeer, Dr Harjinder Singh (2008), SIKH TWAREEKH (5 volumes), Sikh University Press.
