= Virasat-e-Khalsa =

Sikh museum in Anandpur Sahib, Punjab, India

- Official logo

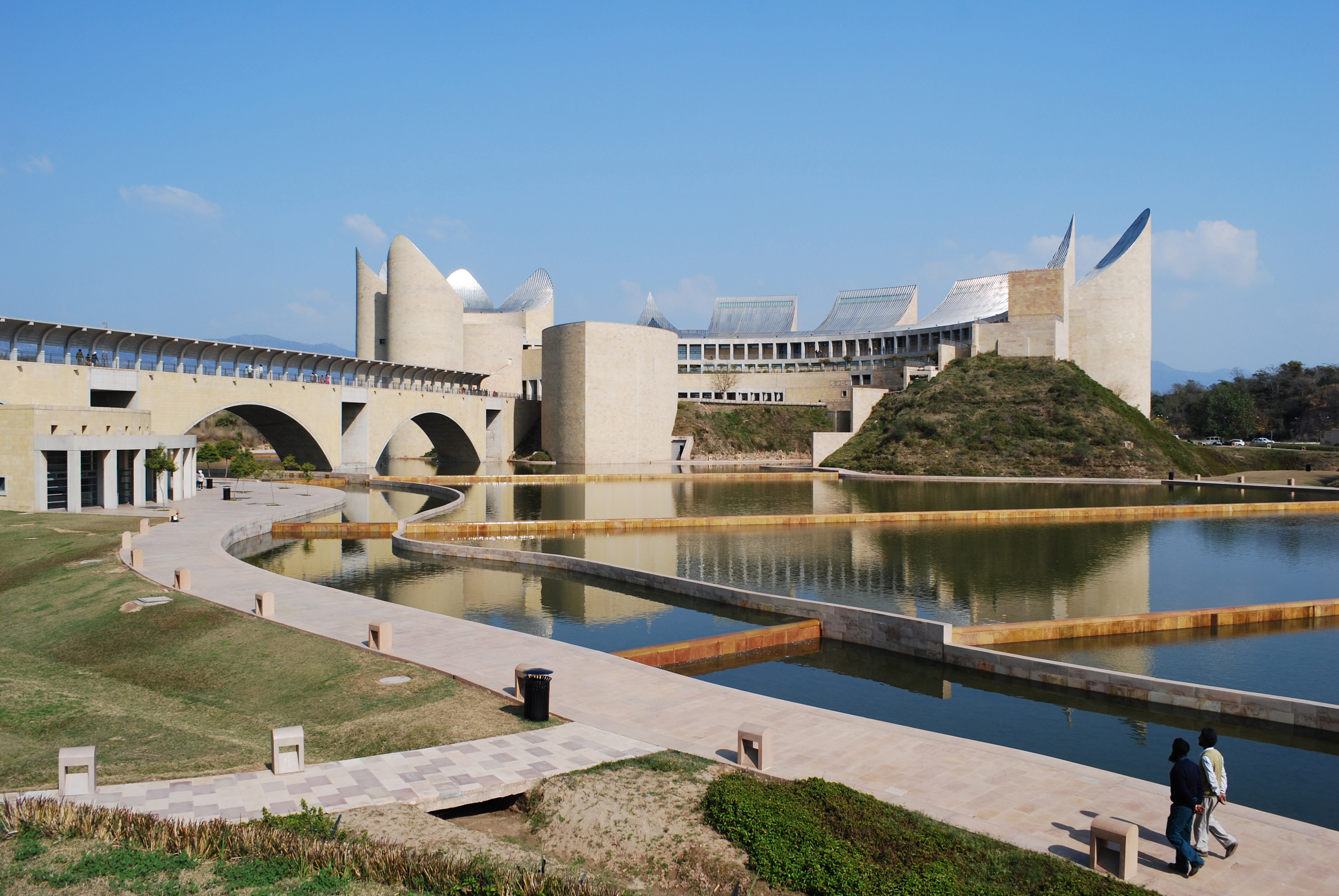
- Virasat-e-Khalsa

- Location within Punjab
- Established: 13 April 1999
- Location: Anandpur Sahib, Punjab, India
- Coordinates: 31°13′55″N 76°30′09″E
- Type: Sikh museum
- Architect: Moshe Safdie
- Owner: Government of Punjab
- Parking: Open
- Website: http://virasat-e-khalsa.net/

Virasat-e-Khalsa, also known as the Khalsa Heritage Complex, is a mega-museum complex of Sikhism, located in the town of Anandpur Sahib, and is close to the Takht Kesgarh Sahib, located in the state of Punjab, India. The museum celebrates 500 years of Sikh history and the 300th anniversary of the birth of Khalsa, based on the scriptures written by the tenth and last of Sikhism's gurus, Guru Gobind Singh. Tourists and pilgrims visit. It is the most visited Sikh museum.

== Foundation ==
The museum was inaugurated on the 550th birth anniversary of Guru Nanak on 25 November 2011. It architecture was designed by Moshe Safdie, incorporating both traditional Sikh architectural elements and modernism.

== Sites ==
The complex is located on over a hundred acres of land. The site consists of two main sections:

- Sikh Heritage Museum, an interactive multimedia museum on Sikh history, religion, culture, and philosophy that consists of the following exhibits and galleries based upon particular themes or periods:
  - Sahib-e-Kamal Gallery, focusing on the Sikh gurus
  - Khalsa Raj Gallery, focusing on the Sikh Empire
  - Chardikala Gallery, focusing on Sikhs facing adverse conditions
  - Virasat Gallery, focusing on Sikh contributions in science, art, literature, education, and medicine
- Khalsa Reference Library, consisting of historical documents, manuscripts, books, and references related to Sikhs

The museum incorporates audiovisual presentations, 3D holographic projections, and interactive displays. The site also features gardens, reflection pools, open-air exhibitions, an amphitheatre, research centre, auditorium, and other educational facilities. The site incorporates digitisation.

== Architecture ==
The buildings are constructed of poured-in-place concrete; some beams and columns remain exposed, though a great deal of the structures will be clad in a local honey-colored stone. The rooftops are stainless steel-clad and exhibit a double curvature: they gather and reflect the sky while a series of dams in the ravine create pools that reflect the entire complex at night. The smaller western complex includes an entrance plaza, an auditorium with 400 seating-capacity, two-story research and reference library, and changing exhibition galleries.

Parkash Singh Badal was inspired by the Holocaust Memorial Yad Vashem in Israel and asked the architect, Moshe Safdie to construct a memorial to the Khalsa. The artificial lake as a sarovar/moat with the bridge representing 'crossing the world-ocean' referenced in Sikh scriptures multiple times by Guru Nanak, Guru Amar Das, Guru Ram Das and Guru Arjan. The first building is a boat-shaped building named 'Punj Paani' which is right after the bridge. The central building in the shape of a leaf represents the Kikkar symbol prevalent in most Sikh coins up until British rule. Safdie designed the turrets to resemble the old fortresses of Punjab, the cluster of five evoke the fortress architecture of the region (most evident in a nearby Gurdwara) and form a dramatic silhouette against the surrounding cliff terrain. The gathering of the galleries in groups of five reflects the Five Virtues, a central tenet of Sikhism. There is one angular turret representing the Kalgi of Guru Gobind Singh. Most of his constructions including the Rashtrapati Bhavan and Secretariat Building, New Delhi used Dholpur stone.

== Visitor numbers ==
On March 20, 2019 the museum set a record for the most people visiting a museum in the Indian subcontinent in a single day. Over 10 million people have visited since it opened. The museum receives around 5,000 visitors daily.

== Scholarly analysis ==
Mathur and Singh ([2015] 2017b) and Glover (2014) claims the museum is "a site of post-national claims by a minority community in a Hindu-dominated state" while Kavita Singh (2015) believes it is the "representative of the emergence of the holocaust museum paradigm in India" with special emphasis on trauma.

== Gallery ==
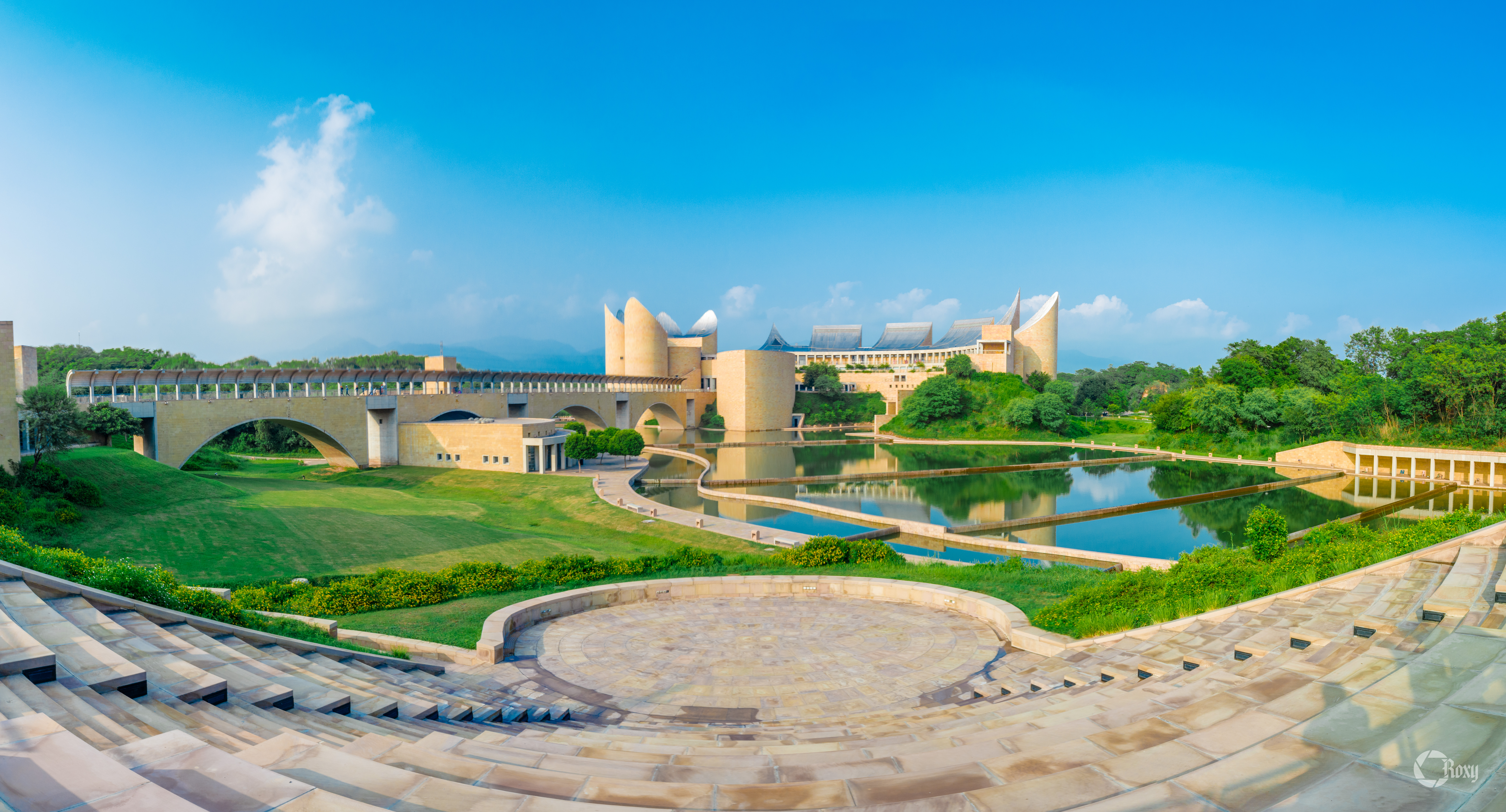
The complex

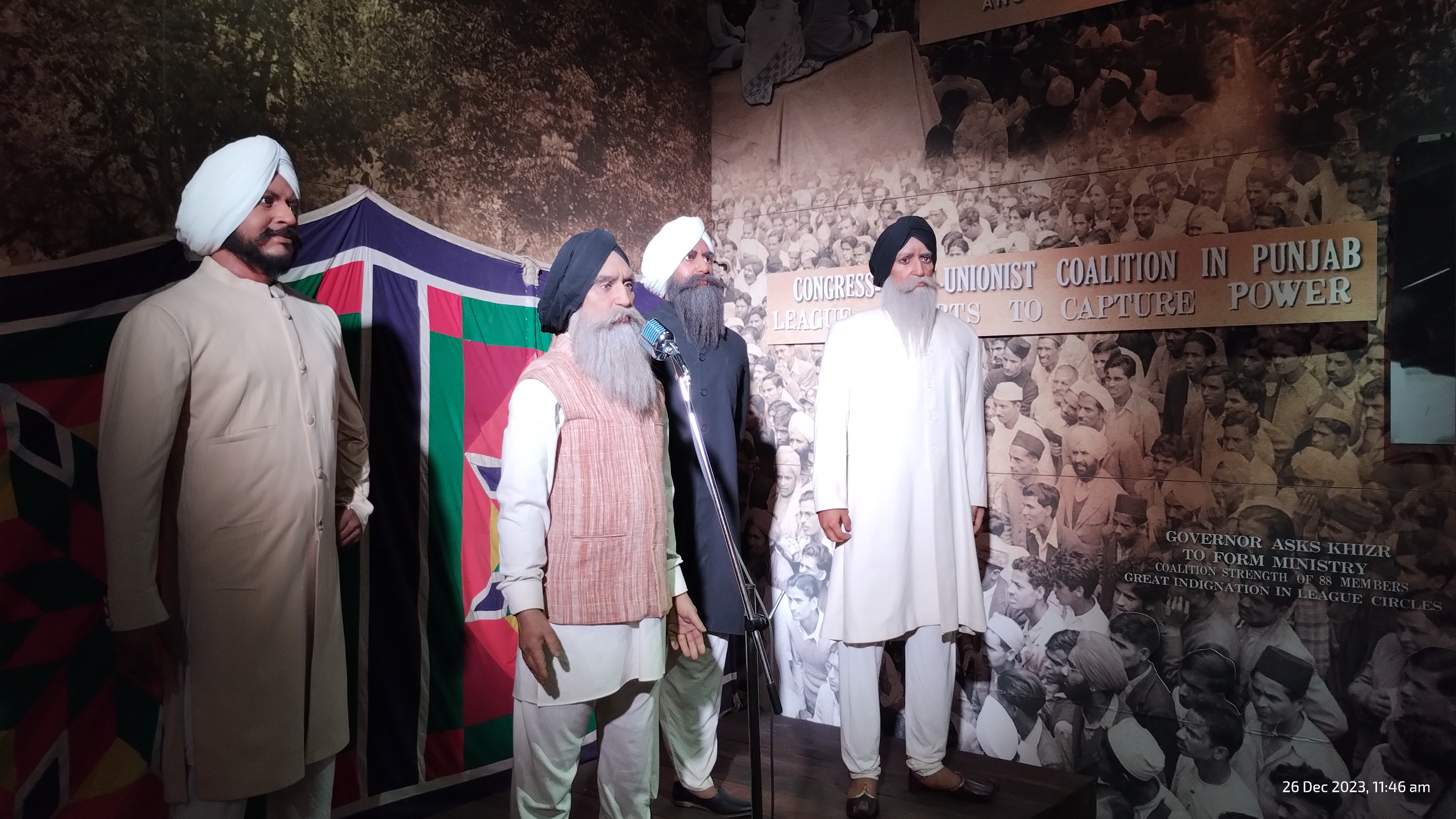
A diorama at Virasat-e-Khalsa Museum

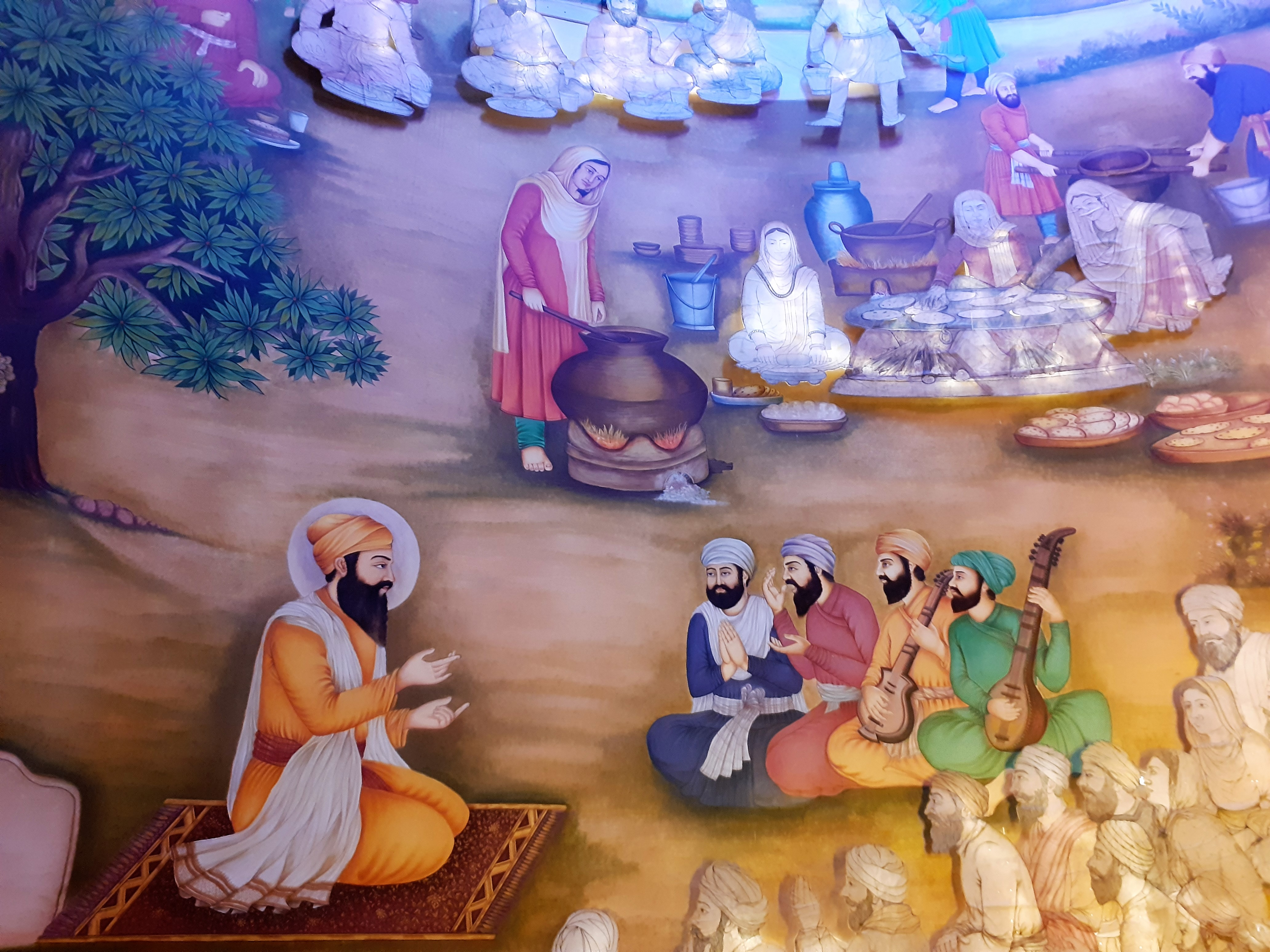
Painting at the complex

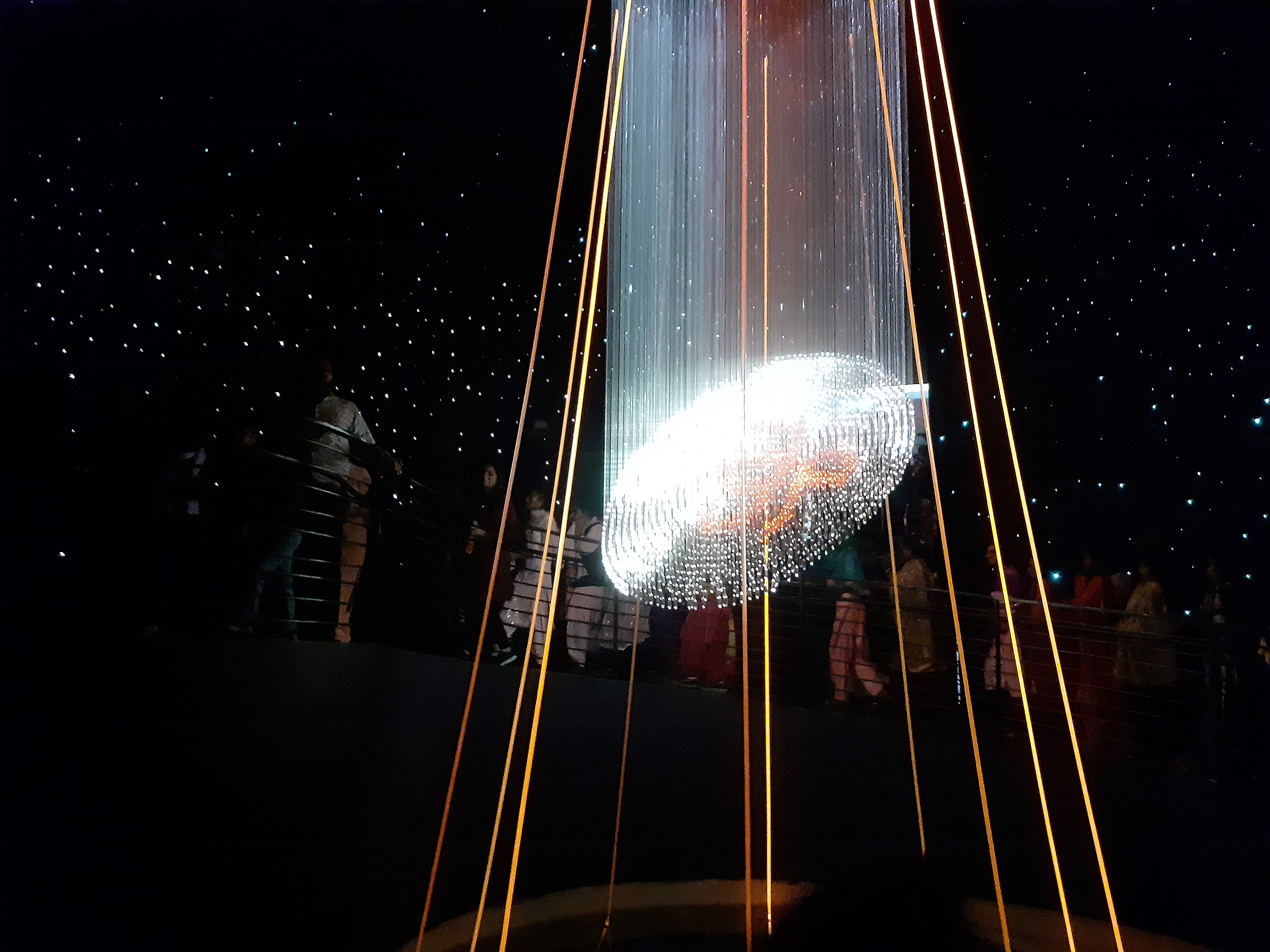
Display at the museum

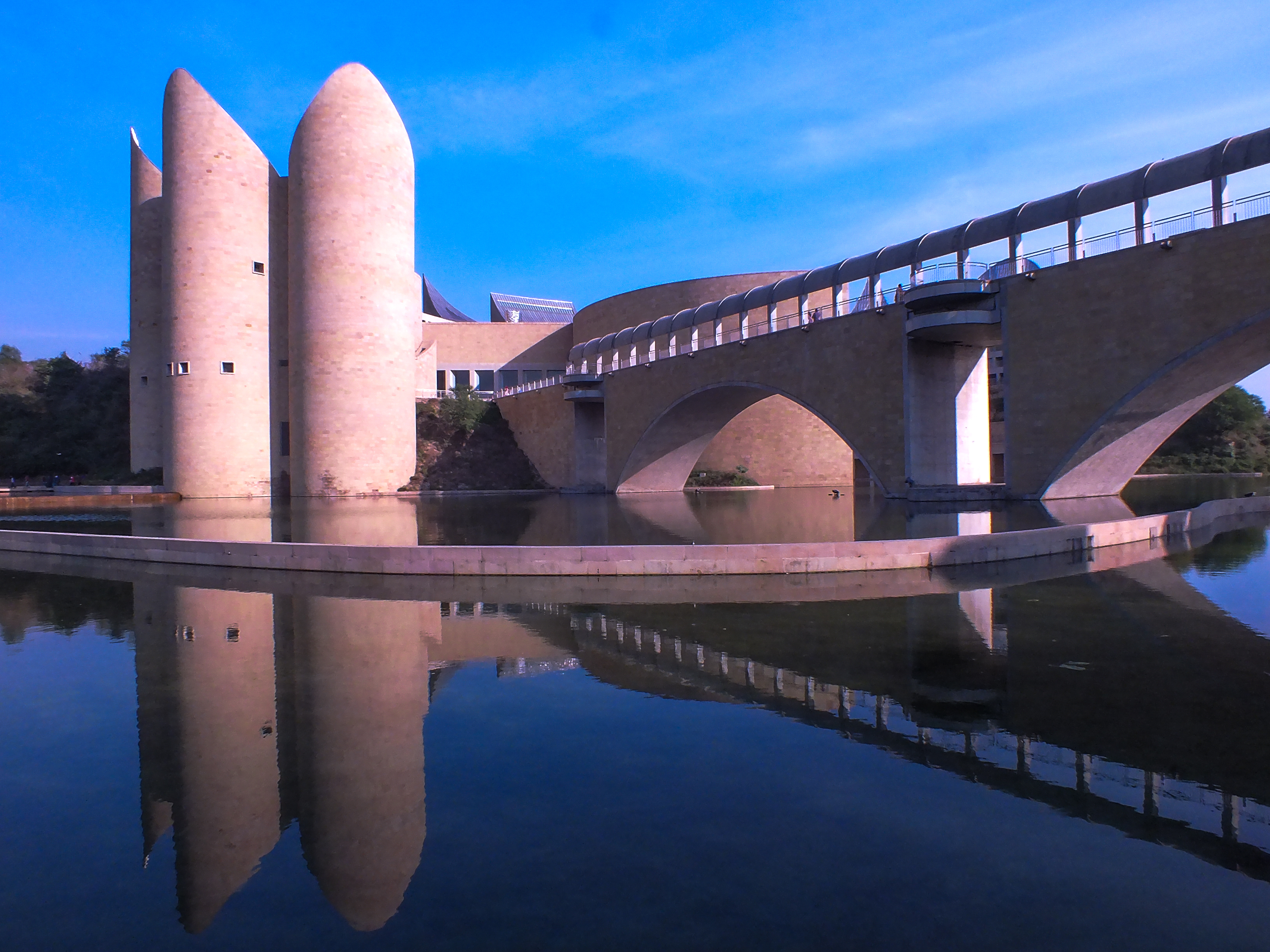
Reflection pool

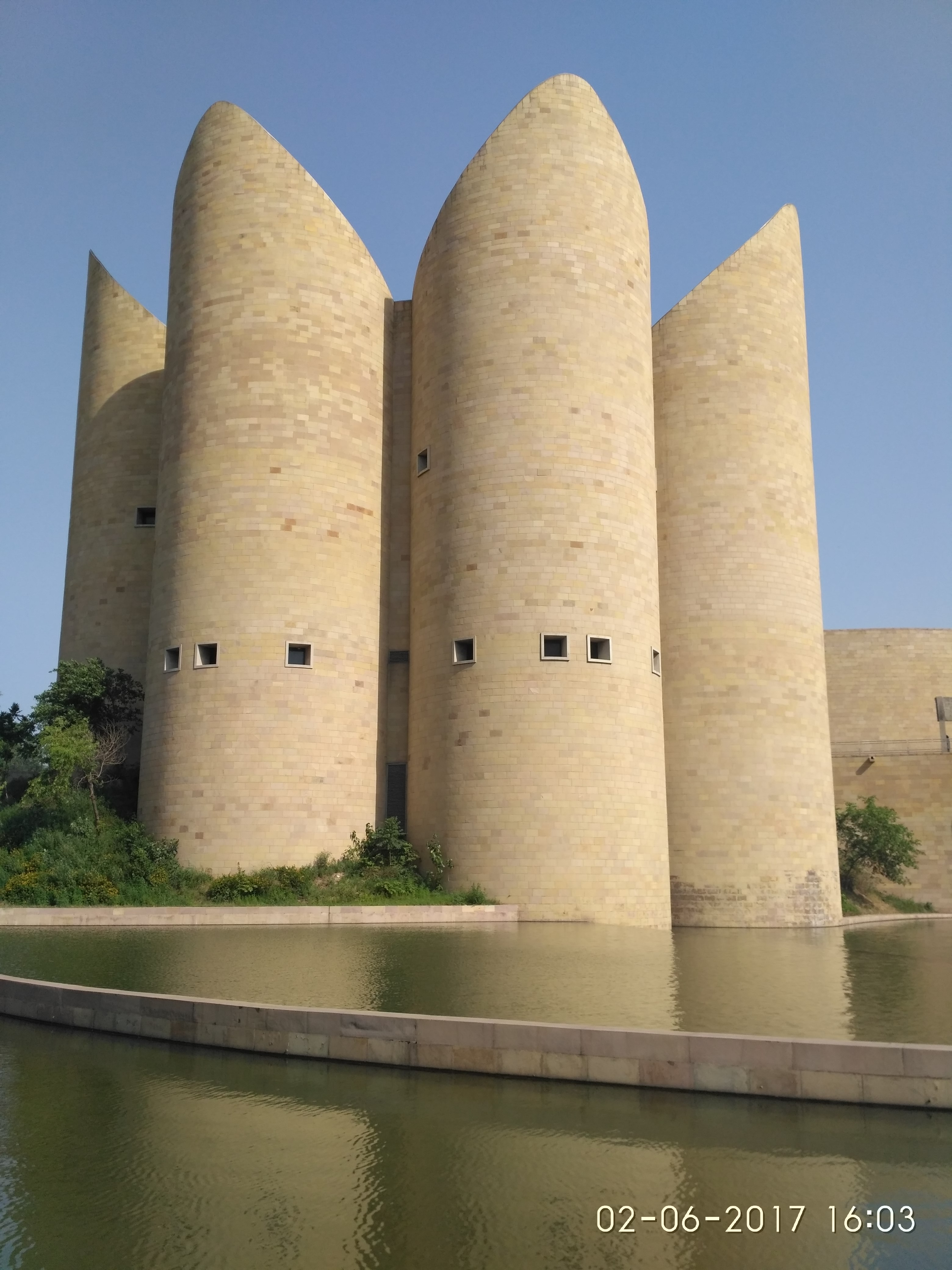
Architecture

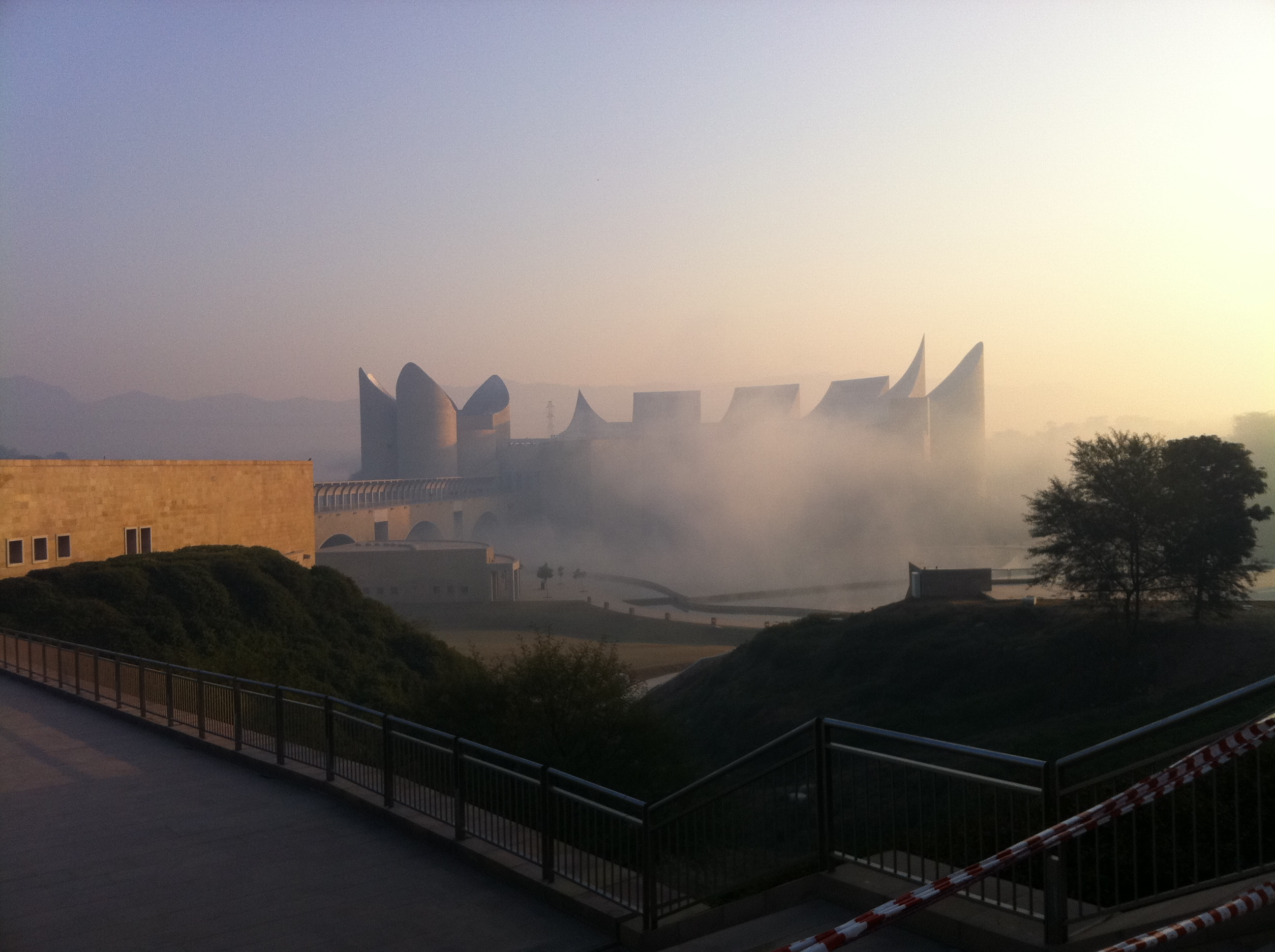
Viewed from afar

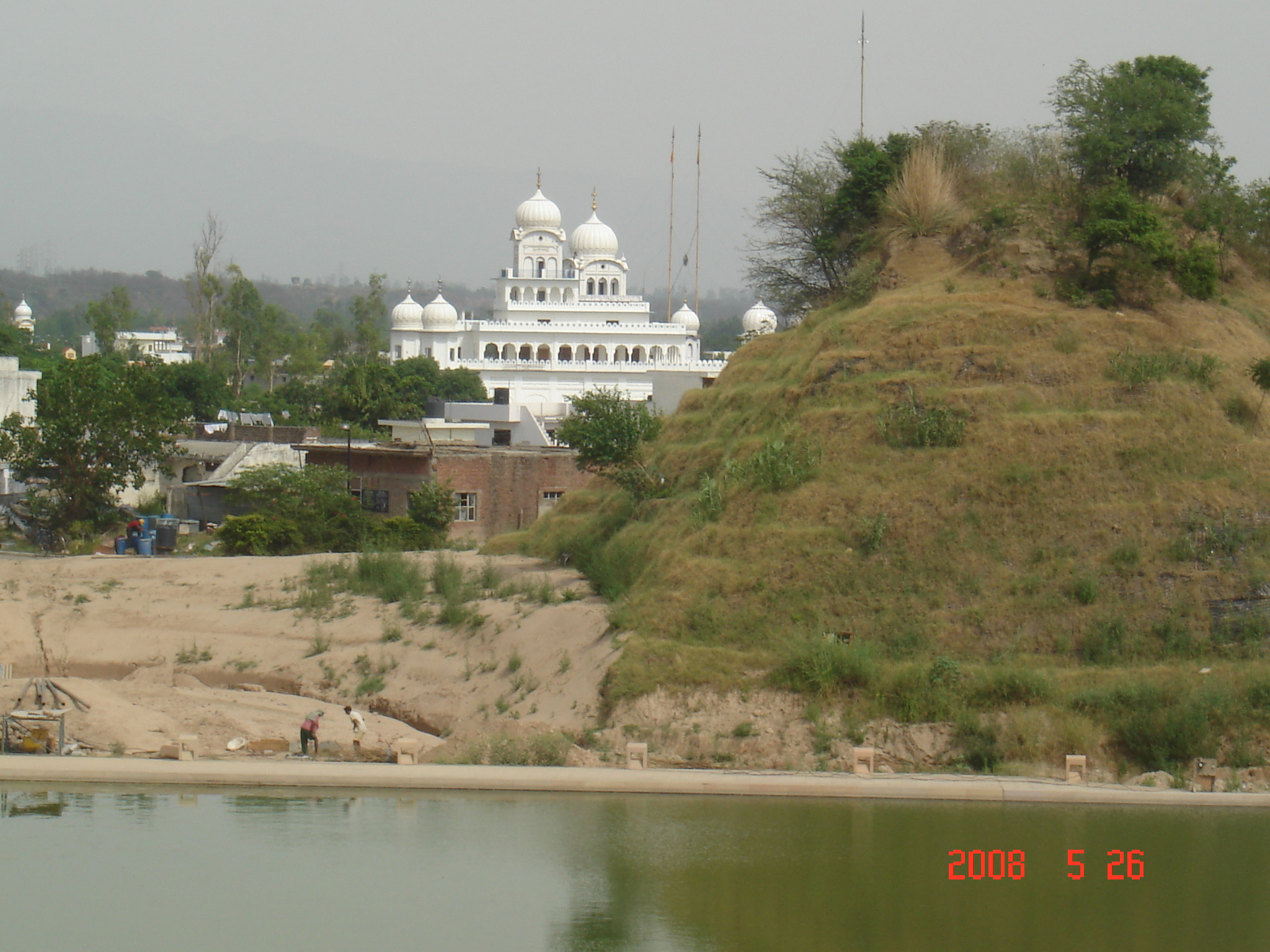
Site in 2008
