= Sikh art =

Sikh art
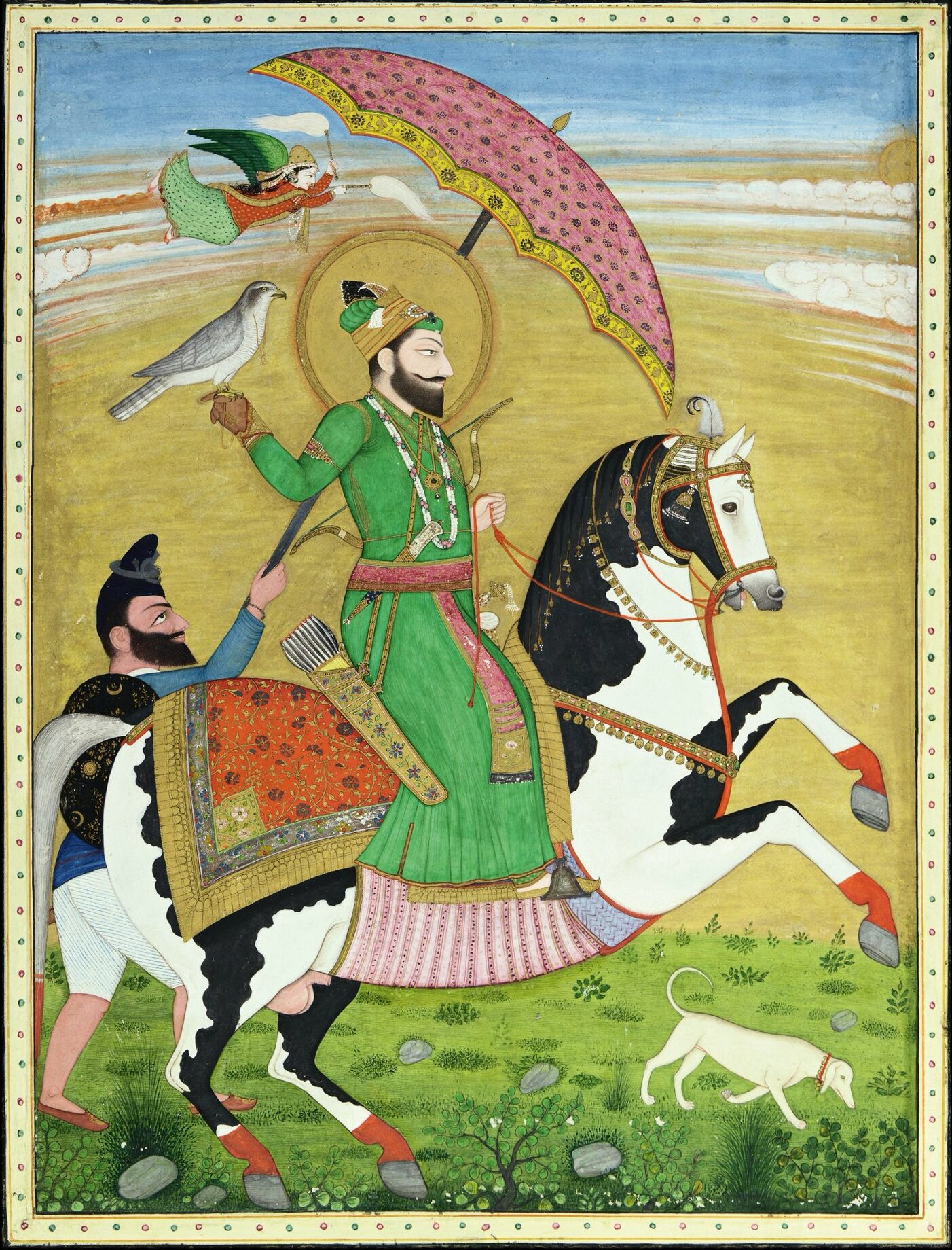
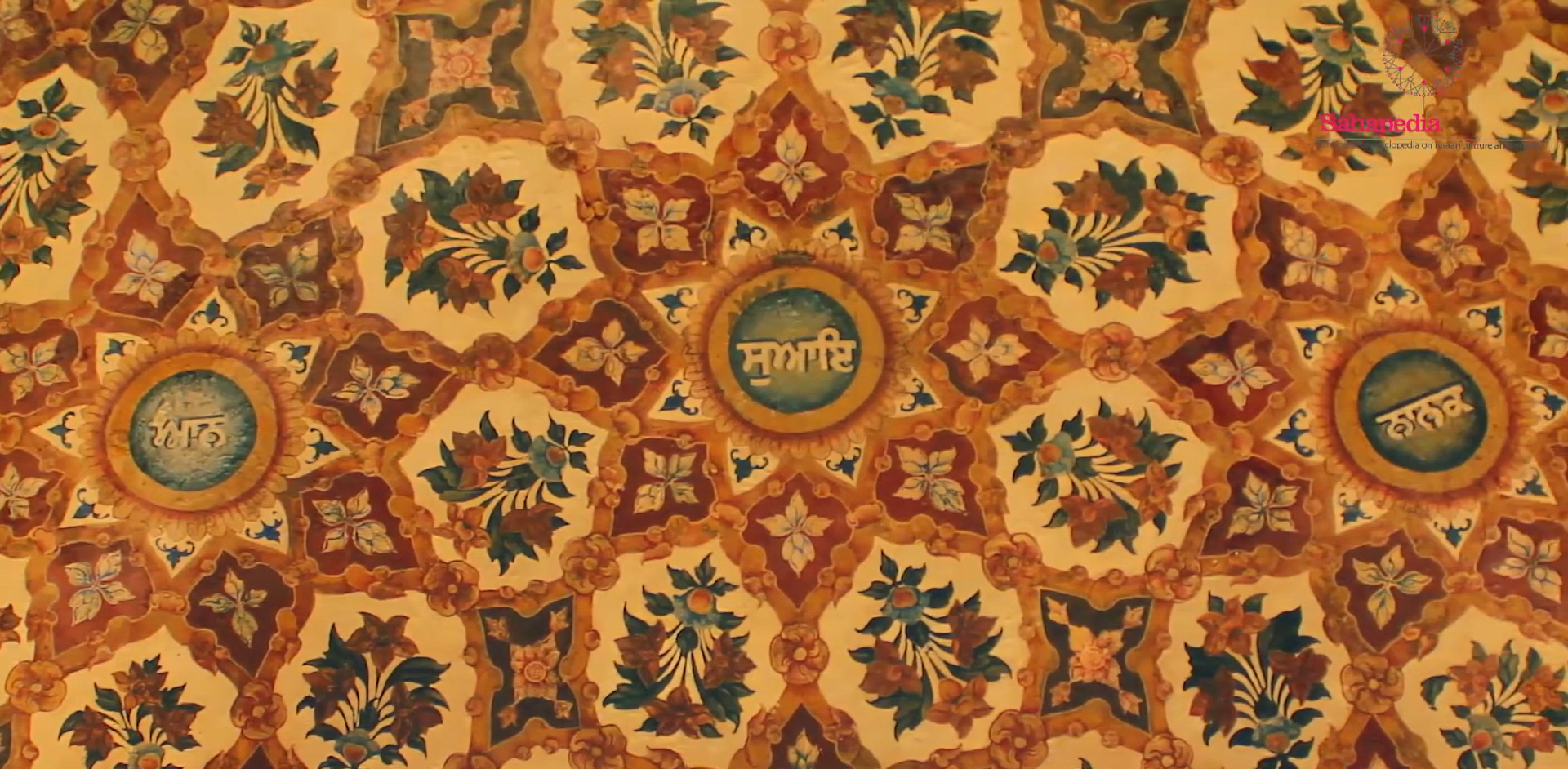
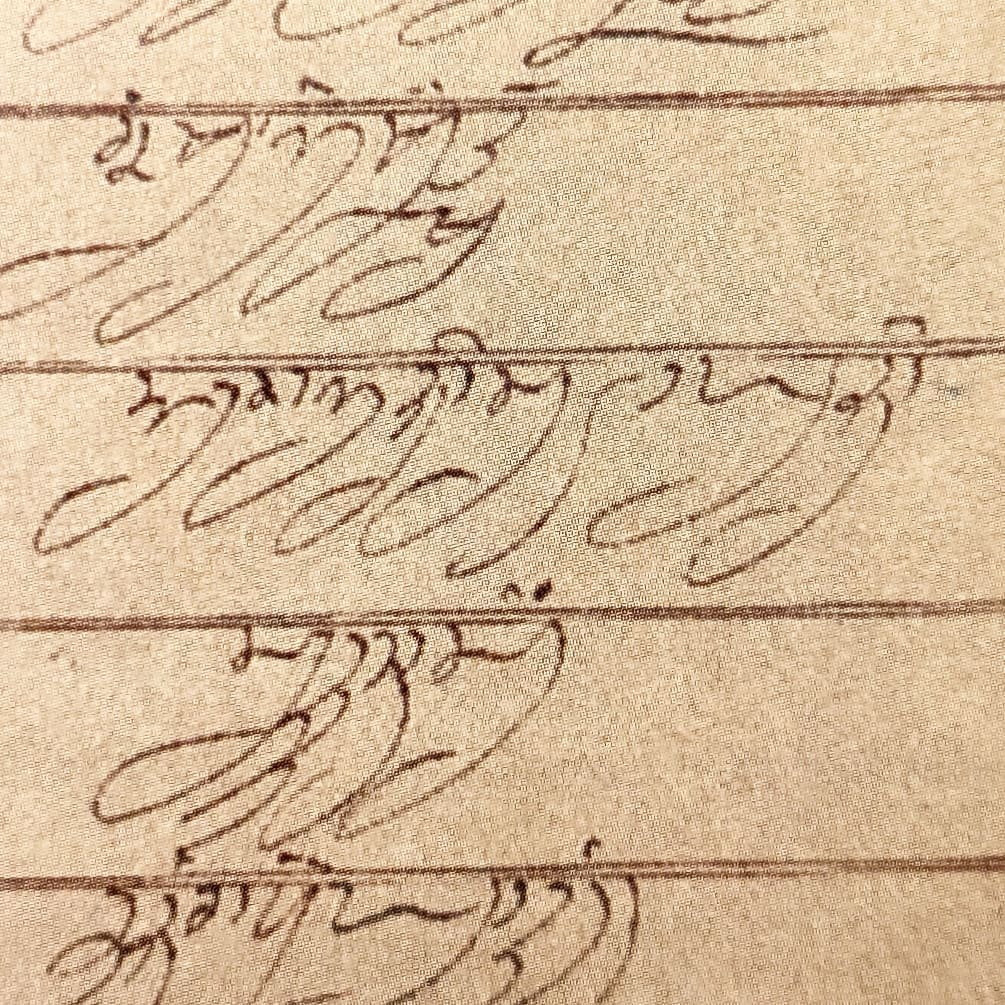
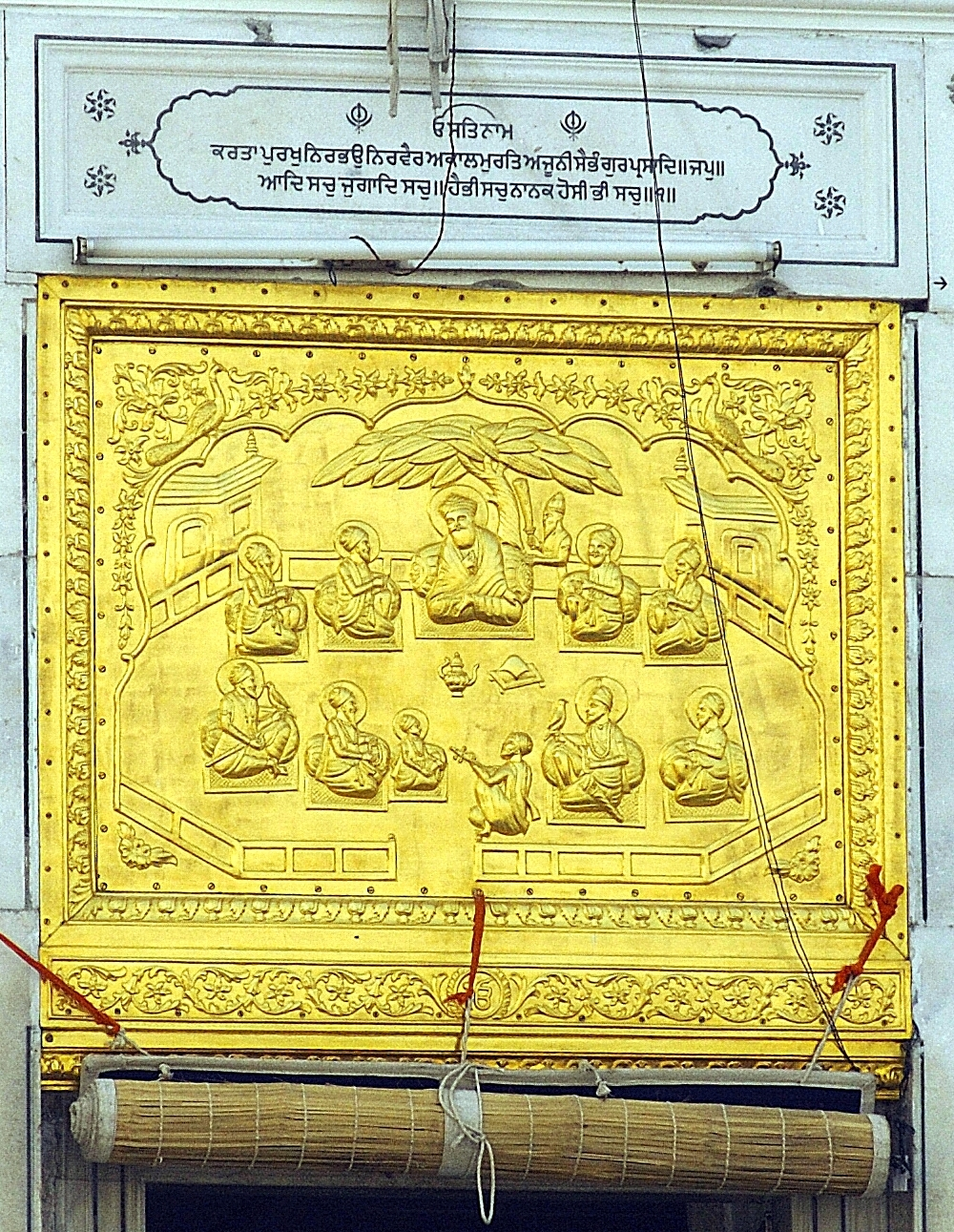
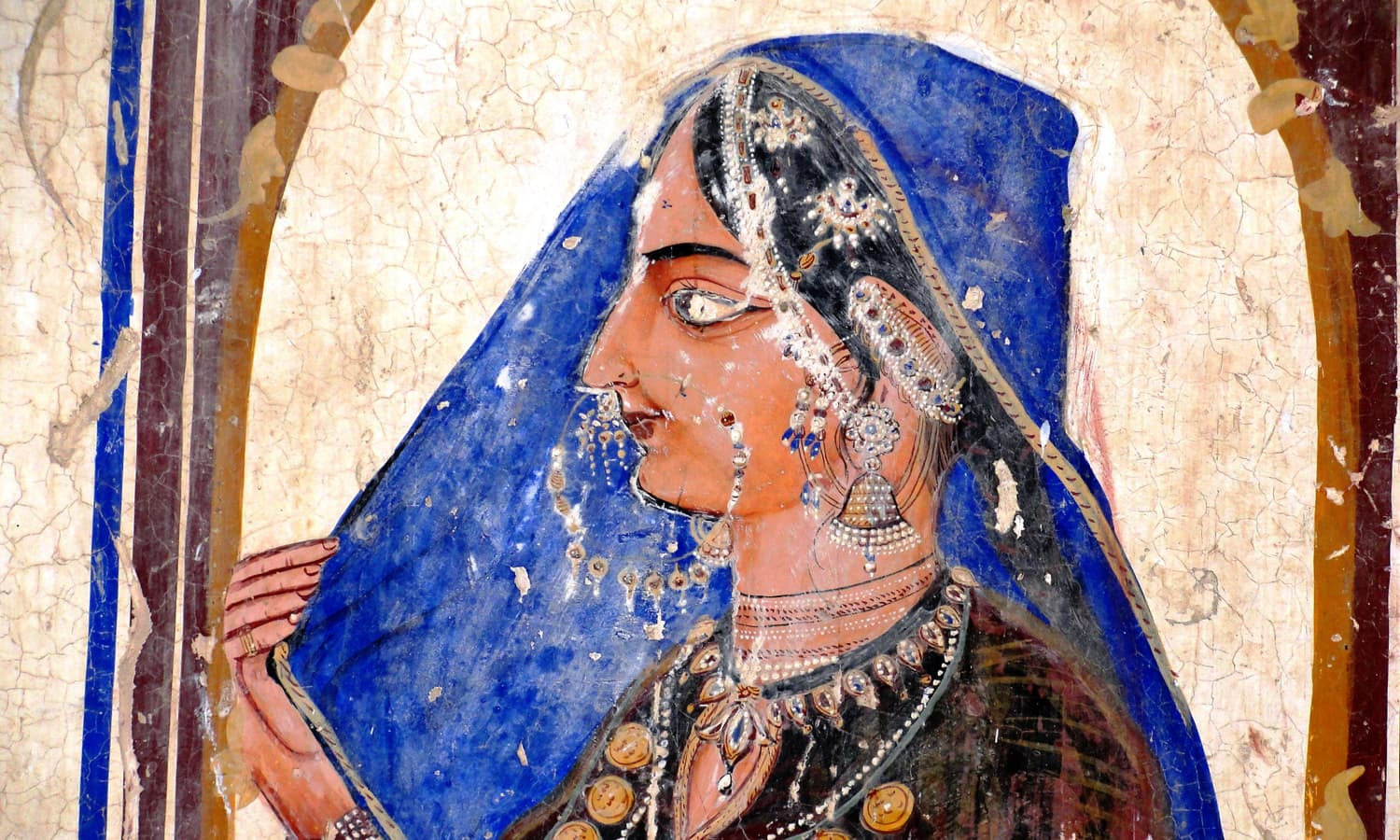
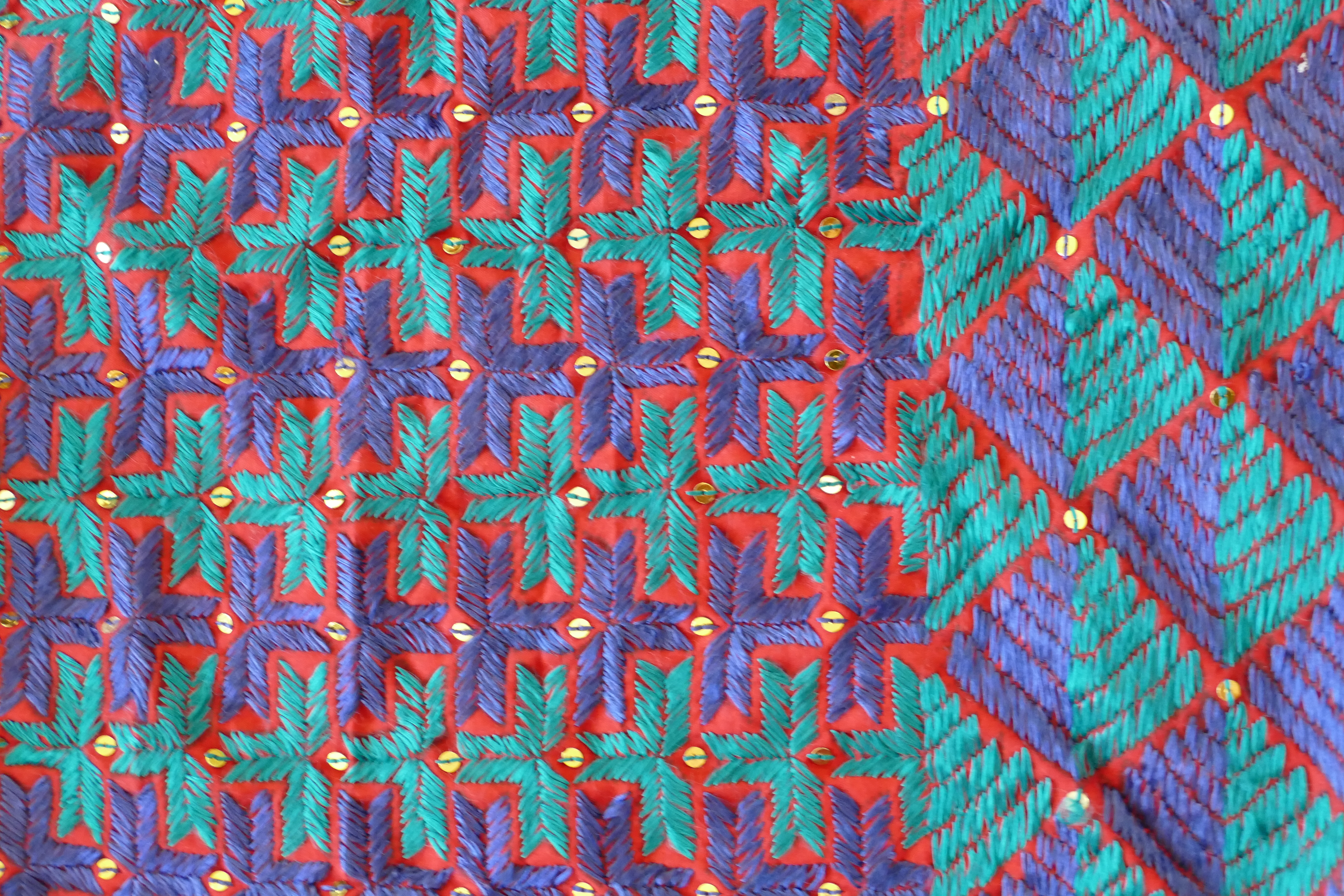
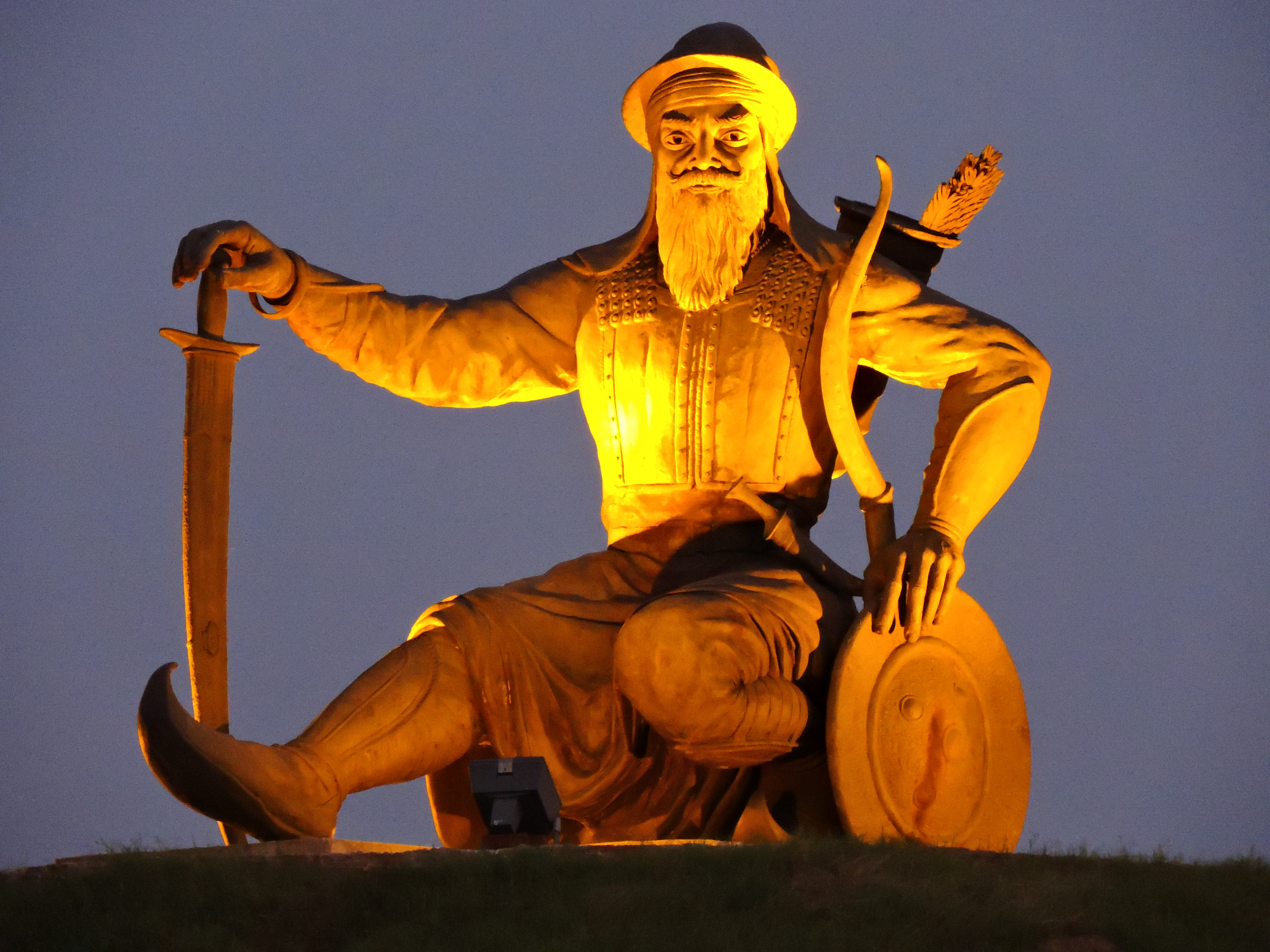
Sikh artwork and artefacts from different periods and styles.

Sikh art, also known as the Sikh School, is the artwork created by or associated with Sikhs and Sikhism. Sikh artwork exists in many forms, such as miniature, oil, and watercolour paintings, murals, and wood carvings. The first Sikh artists were influenced by the Pahari and Mughal schools, however the ushering in of European influences during the colonial-age would transform Sikh art by adopting Western methods and tastes for artwork. Today, Sikh art exists in varying forms and styles, being influenced by the digital age and Internet.

== Definition ==
B. N. Goswamy defines Sikh art as "art made for Sikhs and by Sikhs". W. H. McLeod defines it more broadly as works made in areas under Sikh-rule, those with distinctly Sikh iconography, and those in a style identical to pieces made by Sikh artists or with Sikh iconography. Owing to Sikh artwork's late development, it inherited much from the pre-existing Mughal and Rajput (Pahari and Rajasthani) schools.

== Terminology and categories ==
In 19th century Punjab, there were two main types of artists: musawirs and naqqashas. They worked independently of one another and focused on different spheres, with their styles, materials, and techniques differing from one another. The traditional term rasa describes the specific emotions evoked by an artwork, known as an aesthetic object or experience.

=== Musawirs ===
The Musawirs were painters who drew animated objects. Some artists who specialized in this field were Kishan Singh and Chajju, Imam Bakhsh, and Mohammad Bakhsh. The musawir artists relied on their own memory to reproduce an artistic depiction of someone. One method they used was going out into the bazaars to observe people and then returning to their studio to paint the people they witnessed using their recollection. Their works would be sold to patrons, displayed within havelis or religious sites, or be gifted to nobles and rulers as momentos. Some of the figuratives depicted by them include Sikh nobility, saints, or commonfolk.

=== Naqqash ===
The word 'naqqash' is equivalent to the meaning of chitrakar, and means "decorator" or "illuminator" and refers to a painter or artist who specialized in decoration, illumination, calligraphy, and ornamentation work of addresses, letter-heads, nikah-namahs, idis, janam-patris, and related documents. Naqqash artists were employed to illuminate Perso-Arabic manuscripts, ornamentation of addresses, letter heads, nikah-namahs (marriage certificates), idis, janam patris (horoscopes) and other kinds of records, and the embellishment of calligraphy. It was common for illuminators to also be able to work as calligraphists. The Sikh school of naqqash was initially influenced by Muslim and Vaishnavist Naqqash artists since the initial ones employed to work at the Harmandir Sahib complex during the beautification project by Ranjit Singh were of this background. Some Naqqashi artists belonged to a familial lineage of artists whilst others had been trained specifically by an existing naqqashi master as a pupil. There existed Naqqashi guilds and also ustad-shagird (teacher-disciple) groups. Training Naqqashi pupils mastered their art by developing "... a vocabulary both through experience and imagination". Guild supervisors or the master (in the case of a master-pupil grouping) would also offer suggestions to further beautify the end-result. A Naqqashi artist's mastery of the art form depended upon the number of years he had been training and his own comprehension of forms, style, pattern, colour application. A Naqqash's capacity to transform to physical art relied upon their grasp of literary sources, daily observations, and manual skills to showcase the language of visual art.

== Prominent artisan families ==
The Naqqash artists often were linked to each-other by family bonds, an example being the household of Kehar Singh. The families were known as gharanas. The places and streets the artisan families lived and work in became known after them. Kehar Singh had two nephews who pursued a career in the arts, them being Kishan Singh and Bishan Singh. Bishan Singh had two sons who became artists, Nihal Singh and Jawahar Singh.

Some of the prominent Sikh artisan lineages, along with prominent members, are as follows (with the lineages often being connected to each-other through marriage):

1. Lineage of Bhai Amir Singh Naqqash (Amir Singh → Rood Singh → Ganesha Singh → Hakim Gurcharan Singh)
2. Lineage of Bhai Ambir Singh (Ambir Singh → Kehar Singh and Ram Singh)
3. Lineage of Sangat Singh (Sangat Singh → Bishan Singh and Kishan Singh)
4. Lineage of Charan Singh (Charan Singh → Gian Singh → Sohan Singh)

The lineages of Amir Singh, Ambir Singh, and Sangat Singh were connected through marriage and blood, therefore they can be collectively grouped together and referred to as the "Kehar Singh-Kishan Singh" family.

Prominent Sikh artists

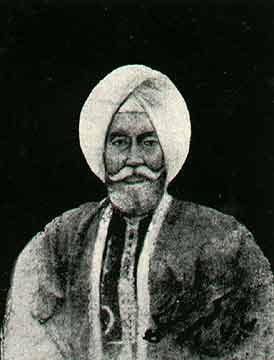
Kehar Singh

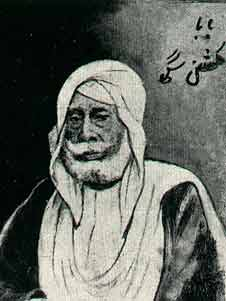
Kishan Singh

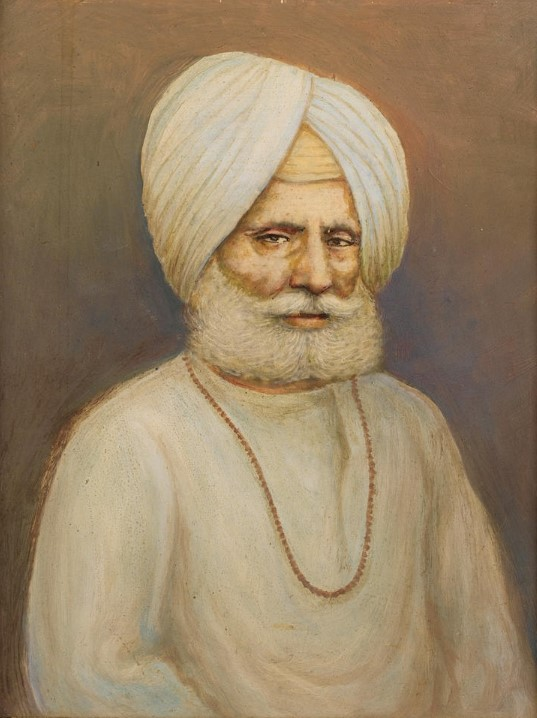
Bishan Singh

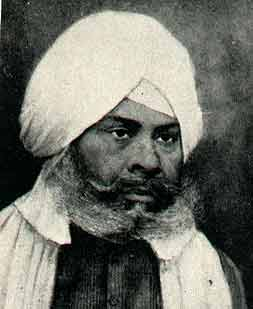
Kapur Singh

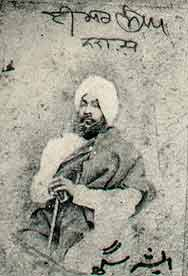
Ishar Singh

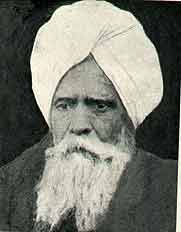
Jaimal Singh

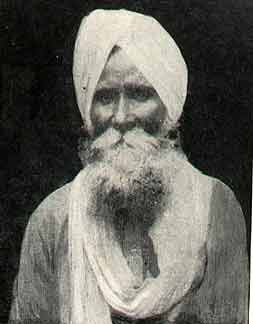
Mehtab Singh

There were also non-Sikh lineages who played a role in developing Punjabi arts, such as the Chughtai family, whom were Muslim. Additionally, the Hindu family of Purkhu-Nain Sukh also worked for Sikh courts. Furthermore, there were independent artists who did not come from artisan families.

The following mohallas (district, quarter, ward, or neighborhood) of Lahore were known centres of operation for artists in the historical period:

1. Kharadi Mohallah (located near Mohallah Rehmat Ullah)
2. Chauhatta Mufti Bakir
3. Masjid Wazir Khan
4. Gumti Bazaar
5. Kucha Naqqashan (located within Lahori Mandi)
6. Mohallah Chabuk Sawaran

In the modern period, there are also examples of Sikh art existing as a trade intergenerationally within families, such as Kirpal Singh and his son Jarnail Singh or Harbhajan Singh and his son Gurvinderpal Singh.

=== Caste of artists ===
In pre-colonial Punjab, the work of an artist at the time was considered lowly by the feudal lords, thus most of the active and prominent artists of the period drew from the lower castes, such as Tarkhans (carpenters), Lohars (blacksmiths), Sonars (goldsmiths), or Julaha (weaver) castes, however some were from Brahmin or Chughtai backgrounds. Sikh artists during this era drew almost entirely from the Ramgarhia (carpenters and blacksmiths) caste. According to Mohinder Singh Randhawa, most of the 18th century Kangra miniature artists and prominent 20th century Sikh artists were carpenters by caste (Tarkhan/Ramgarhia). Ramgharias are the traditional artisan caste of the Sikhs. Koftgars, who performed the damascening of armour and weapons, usually belonged to the Lohar and Sikligar castes.

== History ==
=== Origin ===
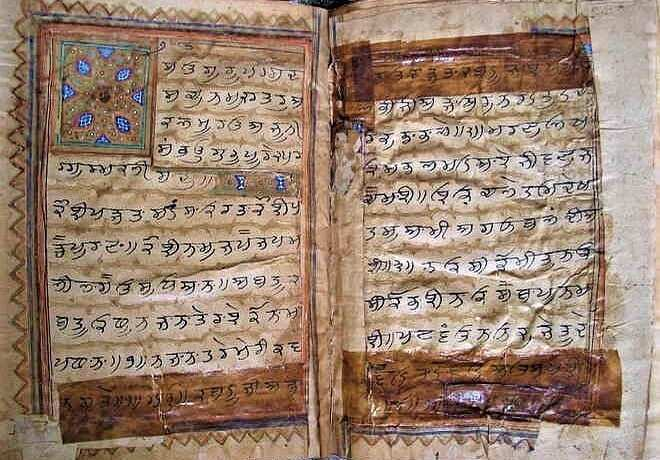
Artistically illuminated folios from a Goindwal Pothi of the Pinjore recension, late 16th century. It is one of the earliest surviving examples of Sikh art

There are claims that Bibi Nanaki may have produced embroidery artwork, however the earliest, confirmable extant Sikh artwork appear in scriptural texts in the decoratively designed opening folios of the Goindwal pothi, dated to the third quarter of the 16th century during the period of Guru Amar Das. The scripture compiled by Guru Arjan in 1604, known as the Kartarpur Bir, features extensive illumination artwork, with its opening folio extensively illuminated in blue and gold. Later on, the Sikh gurus produced calligraphic Gurmukhi autographs of the Mul Mantar known as nishans, those belonging to gurus Arjan, Hargobind, Har Rai, Tegh Bahadur, and Gobind Singh have been identified and dated between 1600 and 1708. The written orders of the later gurus known as hukamnamas, were also decorated and inscribed with a calligraphic style. B. N. Goswamy argues that painting in the Punjab goes back to the 16th century and became influenced by the Mughal school in the early half of the 18th century.

There exists a reference to a painter arriving at Ramdaspur (Amritsar) for the purpose of creating a portrait of Guru Hargobind. Within the Gurbilas Chhevin Patshahi text, there is an account of two Tarkhan painters (a father and son) creating a painting of Guru Hargobind that the guru had commissioned them to do himself:

ਨਖ ਸਿਖ ਰੂਪ ਨਿਹਾਰਿ ਕੈ ਦਯਾਸਿੰਧੁ ਕਰਤਾਰ ।⁣⁣
ਮੂਰਤਿ ਲਿਖਿ ਮਮ ਦੀਜੀਏ ਕੀਜੈ ਪਰਉਪਕਾਰੁ ।੪੮੪।⁣⁣
ਦੇਖ ਪ੍ਰਭੂ ਮਨਿ ਹਰਖ ਕੈ ਨਖ ਸਿਖ ਰੂਪ ਸੁਧਾਰ । ⁣⁣
ਹੈ ਨੀਰਜ ਜਸ ਤਸ ਲਿਖੀ ਮੂਰਤਿ ਅਪਰ ਅਪਾਰ ।੫੦੦।⁣⁣
ਭਗਤ ਸਿੰਘ ਜਾਨੋ ਨਿਰਧਾਰ । ਬਿਧੀ ਚੰਦ ਕੀ ਅੰਸ ਉਦਾਰ ।⁣⁣
ਮੂਰਤਿ ਅਬ ਤਕ ਤਿਹ ਢਿਗ ਅਹੈ । ਕਰਿ ਦਰਸ਼ਨੁ ਮਨ ਬਾਂਛਤ ਲਹੈ ।੫੦੪।⁣⁣

— Bhagat Singh (1718), Gurbilas Chhevin Patshahi (chapter 20)
Translation:

Bidhi Chand said to the Sikh painters "Look at the Ocean of Compassion, the Creator Guru Hargobind carefully from head to toe, and then draw their form, do this great task and give it to me."⁣⁣
Looking at the full portrait painting the Guru was greatly pleased, the Guru and his horse looked so gorgeous, like a lotus flower, its beauty was indescribable! ⁣⁣
Bhagat Singh, the author, says with confidence that this painting can even today be found, held by the descendants of the famed Bidhi Chand, one can see it as one pleases. ⁣⁣

— Jvala Singh (English translation)

When Guru Tegh Bahadur arrived in Dhaka during his travels through the Bengal region in the latter half of the 1660s, Ahsan, the court-painter of Shaista Khan, prepared a painting of him. An account of this can be found both in the Mahima Prakash (1778) by Sarup Das Bhalla and the Suraj Prakash (early 1840s) by Kavi Santokh Singh.

Mother (of Bulaki Das) brought the renowned royal painter. The royal painter prepared the portrait of Guru Tegh Bahadur in the holy presence of the Guru. The entire portrait along with the apparel, worn by the Guru, was prepared by the royal painter, except the radiant face of the Guru. Sensing the helplessness of the painter, the compassionate Guru got hold of the painter's brush and completed the self-portrait with his own hand. Then the Guru presented his portrait to the old lady (mother of Bhai Bulaki Das).

— Sarup Das Bhalla, Mahima Prakash, verses 17–18, page 719

In a series of paintings commissioned by Ram Rai, the eldest son of Har Rai, there exists portraits of the Sikh gurus from Nanak to Har Rai by a Mughal artist. This work was completed before 1688, the year that Ram Rai died, perhaps specifically in 1685. These paintings are kept in the collection of the Mahant of the Ram Rai Darbar complex, Dehradun. However, out of the twenty-two miniature paintings in the collection (which are dated to c. 1685), the one of Guru Nanak with disciples is dated slightly later to c. 1689 by M. S. Randhawa. The oldest currently extant and known figurative Sikh murals are those found within the Bhai Bahlo Darwaza of the Ram Rai Darbar complex in Dehradun, which depict the Sikh gurus and their relatives, which date to between 1707–1710. The murals are ultimately based upon miniature paintings of the Sikh figures kept in the mahant's collection dating to 1685. These are the oldest still-surviving wall-paintings of the Sikh gurus in India.

Various contemporary paintings of Guru Gobind Singh dating to the late 1600s gives evidence of accomplished artists of the time working under Sikh patronage.

Prior to the rise of the Sikh Confederacy, there existed three main schools of painting in northwestern India at the time: the Mughal School, the Rajput School, and the Kangra School. The Sikh school of painting is an amalgamation of both the Mughal and Pahari (with special regard to the Kangra style) schools.

=== Sikh Empire and other states ===
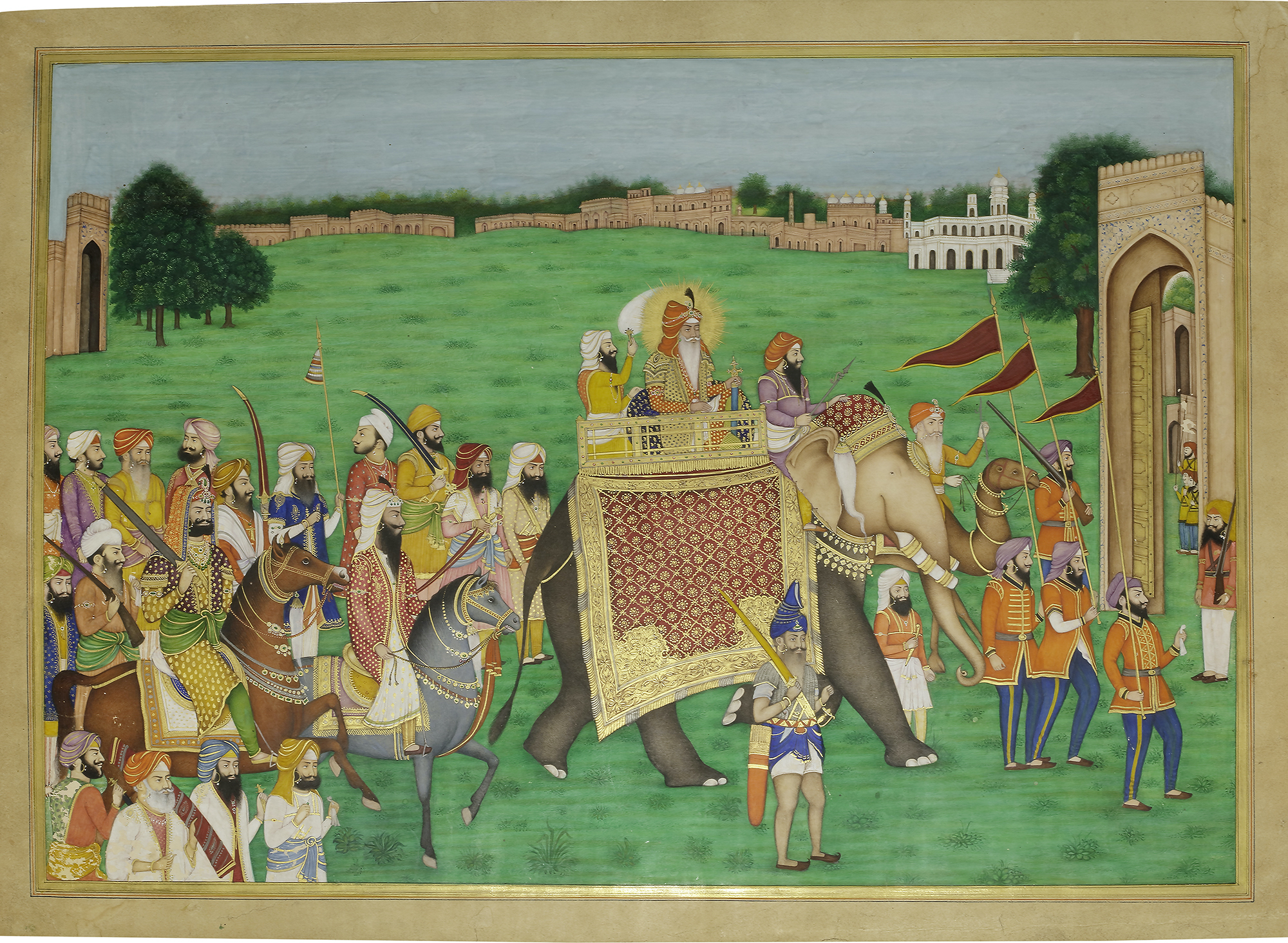
Painting of a royal procession of Maharaja Ranjit Singh on an elephant followed by sons Kharak Singh and Sher Singh on horseback. Opaque pigments and gold on paper, within an inner golden border and an outer ivory border. Probably by a royal court artist of the Punjab rulers. Lahore School and Sikh School, Punjab, 19th century.

The establishment of the Sikh Empire, and the increased wealth and stability in the Punjab as a result, drew many artists from the Hill States in the Punjab Hills region to work under Sikh patronage, leading to greater influence and infusions from the Pahari school into the Sikh school. During the reign of Ranjit Singh, the artistic expressions of jaratkari (inlaid stone and mosaic work), mohrakashi (frescoes), tukri (mirrors and cut-glass work), gach (gypsum and stucco work) and gold embossing reached new heights. There were also developments made during the reign of the Sikh Empire in miniature painting, ivory-work, book illustrations, and frescoes. Paintings created during Sikh-rule can be divided into general categories: portraits, court scenes, equestrian figures, religious themes, and domestic scenes. Most of the individuals depicted in the works were Sikh royals and nobles, as they were the patrons of the artists and wished to have their likeness replicated. Artists operating in the Punjab in this era could be roughly divided into two groups: Pahari emigres and homegrown Punjabi artists. Prior to the reign of Ranjit Singh, artists from the Chughtai family dominated the local Punjabi art-scene, as they had been attached to the Mughal court for quite some time going back generations. However, the Chughtais started working under Sikh patronage when Sikh-rule ushered in. Painting in the Sikh Empire is marked by an emphasis and preponderance with portraiture in-particular.

During the reign of Ranjit Singh, he oversaw over 700 Sikh shrines being decorated with artwork (including paintings). Ranjit Singh conquered the Kangra region, including Guler and Sujanpur Tira. This conquest of major Kangra centres of art precipitated Kangra artists arriving in the Punjab plains and Sikh court, where they would receive royal patronage. Kotla, a centre of Hill Rajput art, was also brought under Sikh writ, which followed with its local artists painting for Sikh patrons and helping develop and establish a Sikh School of art.

In the 19th century, artists originally from Jaipur and Alwar were active in Patiala. Many painters and artisans originally from the Punjabi Hills (or Pahari regions) found employment in the Lahore Durbar and the courts of other states across the region of Malwa (all part of the Punjab Plains). One of the artists who found work in the Durbar of Patiala State or another Phulkian state was Ganga Ram. He may have painted portraits of prominent members and officials of the Patiala court.

Punjabi Sikh forays into art were mostly limited to wall paintings decorating the walls of religious sites up until the early 19th century. Miniature painting depicting Hindu religious scenes and themes was popular in the Punjab Hills amongst the various Rajput states. Between 1810 and 1830, the Sikhs began to commission these Pahari artists to paint Sikh subjects and settings, mostly Sikh royalty and nobility. With the increasing influence and control the Sikh Empire enacted over the Punjab Hills region, local Pahari painters began to work for Sikh patronage, especially during the periods of Sikh governorship over Kangra from 1809 onwards and Guler from 1813 onwards under the governorship of Desa Singh Majithia, Lehna Singh Majithia, and Raja Sher Singh. The Pahari painters began this relationship with their newfound Sikh patrons by painting Sikh gurus, later they delved into depicting particular Sikh rulers and officials. Ranjit Singh himself is said to have disliked portraiture depicting himself, apparently due to his unattractive appearance. However, Ranjit Singh did maintain a company of artists at his court, perhaps to appease some exuberant members of the Sikh court. In January 1836, Baron Hugel visited the Sikh court and was met with a local artist that the court had sent to draw his uniform, with Hugel praising the artistic skills of the artist. Hugel also reported that Hari Singh Nalwa owned a collection of paintings, including one depicting the tale of Nalwa slaughtering a tiger. In March 1837, Godfrey Vigne tried without success to draw a portrait of Ranjit Singh, with Vigne stating the following:

"By persevering in my request, Runjit at length allowed me to attempt his portrait in full durbar. When I first asked him I was at Lahore, in company with Baron Hugel. He coloured, smiled, and replied, "To-morrow, at Amritsir!" which was only an oriental mode of refusing, as he had no idea of going to Amritsir. I again respectfully urged the request, "No! No!"' he said, "I am an old man. Take his picture," pointing to Heera Sing; "He is young and handsome." This, however, I never did, as it would have looked too much like flattery to his master. Had I been obsequious enough to have given Runjit two eyes, he would probably have made no objection; and when he did sit to me, he was constantly turning away, so as to conceal his blind side."

— Godfrey Thomas Vigne (1842), page 274

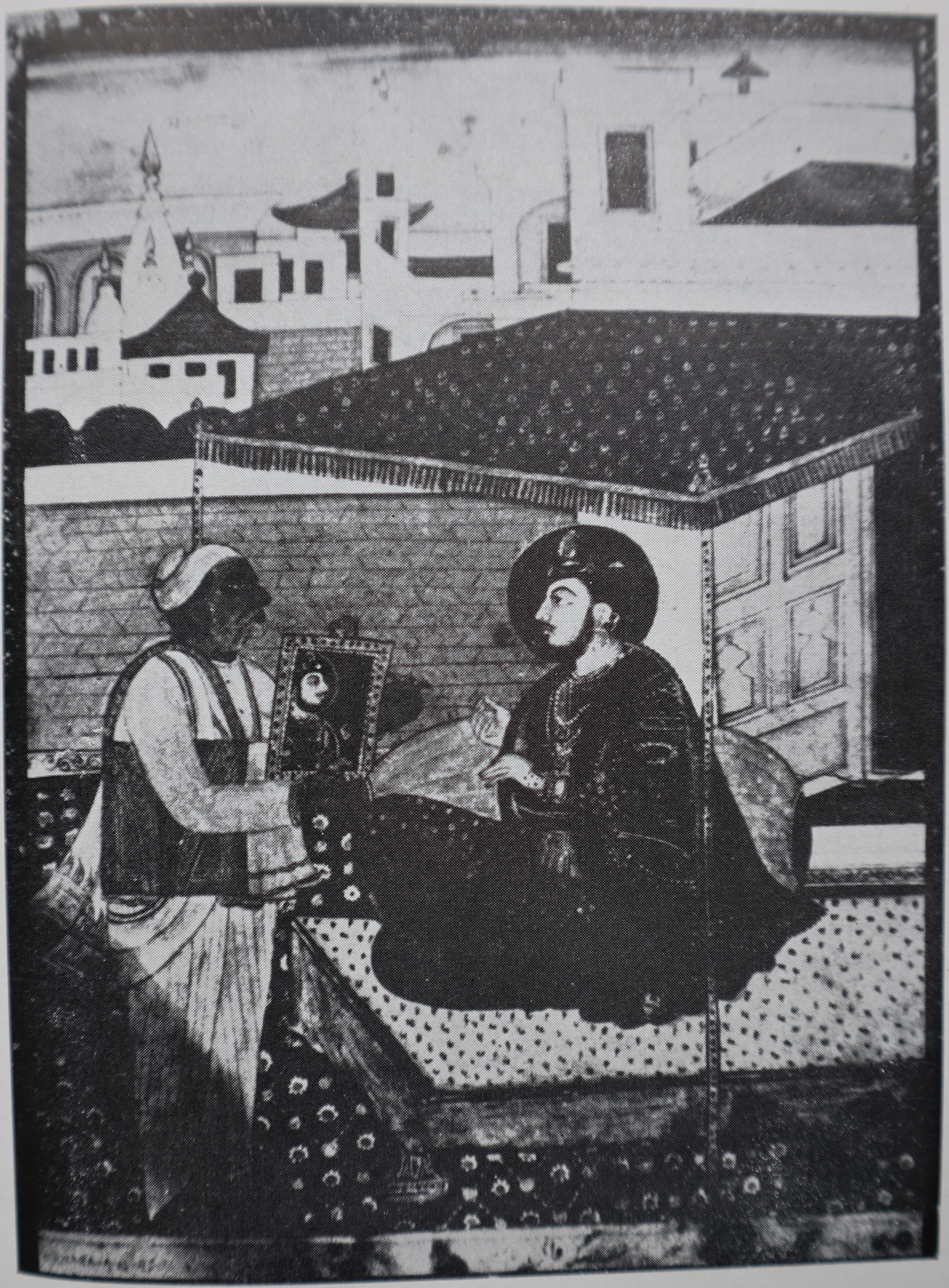
Painting of Bharpur Singh of Nabha State with an artist, peering at his reflection in a mirror, circa 19th century

There are fewer European artwork depicting Punjab and Sikhs when compared to other people and regions in India due to the fact that the Punjab was the last region of India to be conquered by the British. Despite this, the Sikh courts invited Western artists to their realms to carry out work, usually portraiture. After Sikhs came into increasing contact with Europeans after 1830, the main influence on Punjabi Sikh art shifted from Pahari styles and methods to European ones. The Punjabi form and localization of Company paintings would be born from this increased interaction between European and Punjabi artists. Thus, Pahari-influenced traditional miniature paintings began to be surmounted by European-influenced Company school paintings. Lahori and Amritsari artists increasingly abandoned using the traditional Indic medium of gouache for watercolour techniques. The Company school was less-developed in Punjab and Kashmir as compared to other regions of India by this time as the Sikh Empire was only annexed by the British in 1849, meaning European and Western artistic influences were mostly introduced at a later date compared to other areas of the subcontinent which were annexed years earlier.

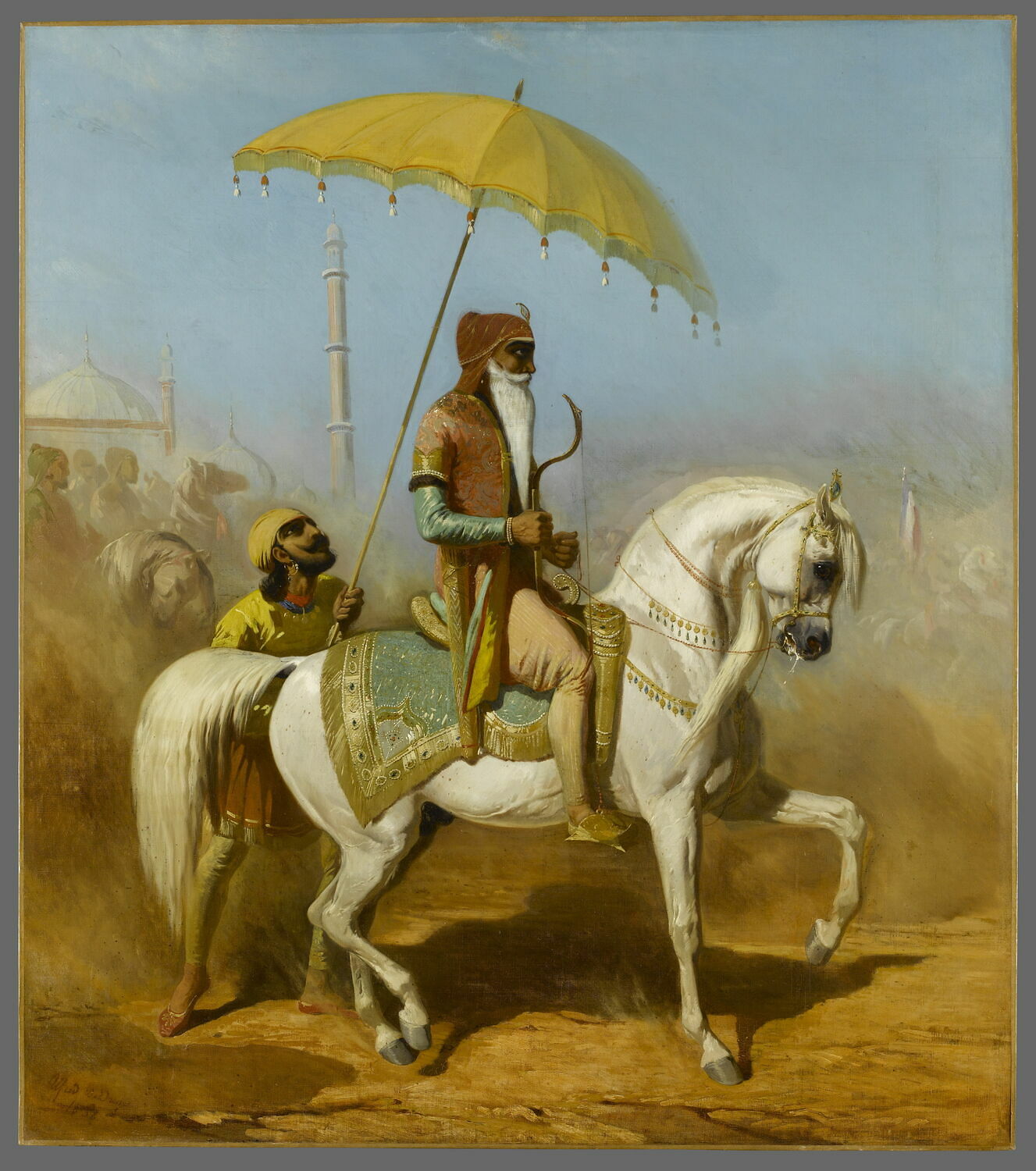
Equestrian painting of Maharaja Ranjit Singh of the Sikh Empire, titled 'Randjiit Sing Baadour, Roi de Lahore', by Alfred de Dreux, 1838. A French flag can be seen in the background to the right. Kept in the Louvre Museum. Originally commissioned by Jean-Baptiste Ventura and presented to King Louis-Philippe of France.

In 1838–39, a British visitor hired local Punjabi artists to produce pictures covering the various kinds of inhabitants of northern India using British-supplied paper and bound into an album. Images of the Sikh royals and military were documented in these British-patronized local paintings. Many Europeans were employed by the Lahore Durbar, such as the Frenchman Jean-François Allard, and were sponsors of the local arts. A few European artists who visited the Sikh court of Lahore and left a deep impact on the local art were: G. T. Vigne (visited in 1837), William G. Osborne (visited in 1838), Emily Eden (visited in 1838 alongside her brother), and August Schoefft (arrived in 1841). Eden had a large impact, as her published work Portraits of the Princes and People of India (which included lithographic depictions of Sikhs and Punjabis) was a big success and many copies of the work made their way to Punjab where they ended up giving further shape to the emerging Punjabi Company School. Schoefft spent over a year in Punjab painting various local scenes and subjects. During the Anglo-Sikh Wars, many of the British officials and soldiers who made their way to Punjab were artists. An example is Henry Lawrence, who painted local residents of various walks of life. Many Indian artists who followed the Company school were hired to paint Punjabi subjects and settings.

Patrons of religious sites carried-out the beautification of their premises through begar (bonded labour) of the artists. Names of prominent artists during the period of the Sikh Empire include Hukama Singh, Muhammad Bakhsh, Kehar Singh, Jivan Ram, Abdullah Painter, Muhammad Azeem, Mian Noor Muhammad, Kishan Singh, Bishan Singh, Lal Singh, Hira Singh, Habib Ullah, Qazi Lutfullah, and many more.

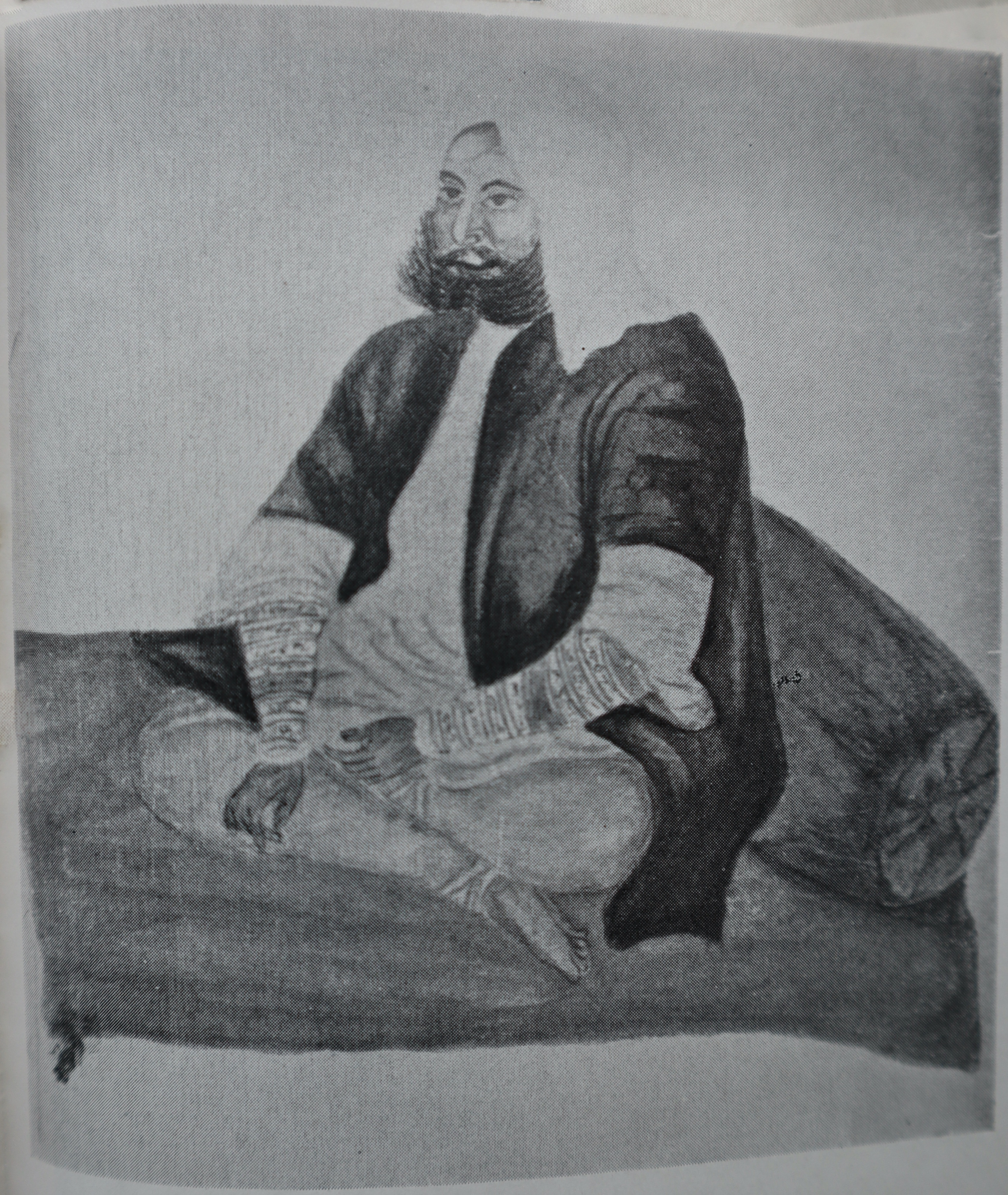
Kehar Singh, the court artist of Lahore and Kapurthala states, seated against a bolster, circa 19th century

Baba Kehar Singh Musawar was a prominent artist of the Sikh Naqqashi school of art and helped innovate it. He also worked on adornment work. Bhai Bishan Singh (1836–1900), another Sikh artist, was both the pupil and nephew of Kehar Singh. Bishan Singh was skilled in arabesque and was responsible for the commencement of fresh and bright brush strokes. Bishan Singh also was the art teacher of his two sons, Nihal Singh and Jawahar Singh. They painted natural and realistic figuratives, such as flora or fauna, rather than fantastical or mythological-based elements. Nihal Singh was the instructor of Bhai Gian Singh Naqqash, the last of the traditional Sikh muralists. Jawahar Singh, the other son of Bishan Singh, also served as a later instructor of Bhai Gian Singh Naqqash.

Some names of artists who were prominent in floral decoration were Rudh Singh, Amir Singh, Ganesh Singh, Gian Singh, Kapur Singh, Puran Singh, Aroor Singh, and Bhai Gian Singh Naqqash.

Maharaja Sher Singh, unlike his father Ranjit Singh, was interested in portraiture and enjoyed being depicted in them, with Sher Singh having been a handsome man and possessing an attractive personality. Von Orlich visited the Sikh court in 1842 during the reign of Sher Singh and noted the following:

"On occasions of this kind, it is customary for the Indian nobles to bring the artist attached to the court to take portraits of those present. The painter of Shere Singh was, therefore, incessantly occupied in sketching with a black lead pencil those likenesses which were afterwards to be copied in water colours, in order that they might adorn the walls of the royal palace; and some were admirably executed. I was among the honoured few, and the artist was very particular in making a faithful representation of my uniform and my hat and feathers."

— Von Orlich (1845), pages 206–207

After the assassination of Maharaja Sher Singh, patronage of artists by the Sikh court and rulers continued during the reign of the child-monarch, Maharaja Duleep Singh. Around the time of the British annexation of the Sikh Empire, John Login noted the following regarding paintings of Duleep Singh's court:

"The little Maharajah has been collecting for me drawings and paintings done by his best painters. Some are very curious and interesting indeed, representing domestic life in the Punjab, and various trades and professions. He has also selected authentic likenesses of the great chiefs and men of note."

— John Login (1890), page 160

By this time, the 19th century miniature painters tended to produce facsimiles of the paintings of earlier artists to sell based upon their likeness to the earlier works, with original works being less-common than before, thus originality started to decline.

=== Colonial period ===
After the British annexed the Punjab and adjacent regions in the aftermath of the Second Anglo-Sikh war, traditional Indian artistic methods saw a period of decline, being replaced gradually by European methods. This is attributed to the British taking control over the local administration, economy, and supply chains, with the locally manufactured products and traditional handicrafts not being able to compete with the imported English goods. This led to local artists procuring abandoning local supplies for imported ones, such as English paper, with these imported products being of diverse qualities that were cheap and easily available but not always durable and sympathetic. Furthermore, local artists shifted to meet the demands and tastes of Europeans, rather than local Indian patrons. Many local Indian patrons themselves were shifting to a more European-like taste and affinity for art, as they became attracted by Western imagery and styles. This led to a Europeanization of local Punjabi art after the annexation by the British. The unique Sikh style of artwork that had been developed and cultivated under Sikh-rule continued until the 1860s. During the 1880s, Diwan Buta Singh of Lahore and Partap Singh of Amritsar and distributed images of Maharaja Duleep Singh in the Punjab.

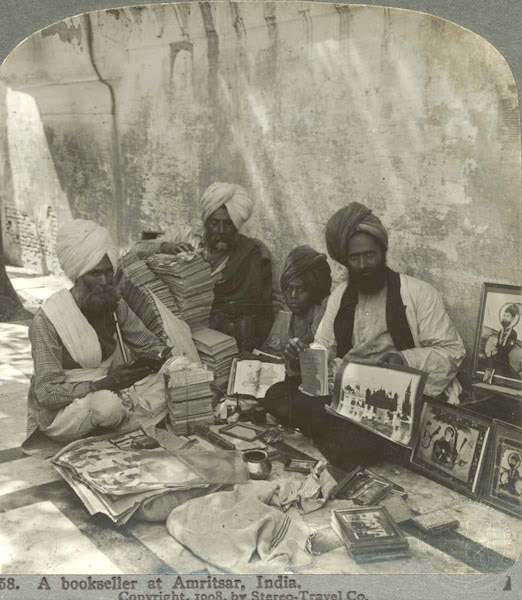
A bookseller with Sikh religious prints and posters, Amritsar, circa 1908

When the Sikh Empire was annexed in 1849, local Punjabi artists working in the Company style created works based upon stock sets for the purpose of selling them to European tourists in the local bazaars. These Punjabi paintings geared towards a European audience depicted "Sikh rulers, heroes, occupations, and costumes". Traditional Sikh art suffered greatly with the establishment of the Mayo School of Art in Lahore (present-day National College of Art) in 1875–76. Native students at the school were instructed in western styles rather than indigenous ones, which led to the decline of the native techniques and methods. The local artists were instructed to create works that suit "... European tastes and requirements". Similar trends of deteriorating Indian art traditions and cultures could be observed in the same period at Bombay, Calcutta, and Madras, where Western art was given more importance than indigenous Indic arts.

An anonymous European woman artist in 1854 completed a number of paintings depicting Punjab, known as Original Sketches in the Punjaub by a Lady. Other Western artists active in Punjab during the post-annexation years were William Carpenter, William Simpson, John Lockwood Kipling, Edwin Lord Weeks, Charles W. Bartlett, whose works are characterized as being picturesque, with them usually visiting Amritsar (principally the Golden Temple) and Lahore.

The Chughtai family shifted from working under Sikh patronage to British patronage with the annexation of Punjab. Kapur Singh had a son named Sardul Singh, whom was an esteemed painter and photographer of Amritsar active around the year 1900. Martyrdom as a major theme in Sikh artwork popularly began in the 1920s by depicting the two martyred gurus, Arjan and Tegh Bahadur, in their deaths as martyrs. The martyrdom theme was expanded upon in the following decades by including depictions of the martyrdom of figures like Baba Deep Singh and Bhai Taru Singh where the Muslim perpetrators are othered.

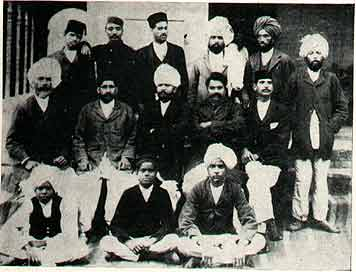
Group of Punjabi painters and artisans photographed in 1911

By the early 20th century, Amritsar and Lahore emerged as the main centres of Sikh art production. Many prominent artists of this time period include Hussain Baksh, Mohammad Alam, K. C. Aryan, Abdul Rahman Chugtai, Mala Ram, Sri Ram, Allah, Bakhsh, S. G. Thakar Singh, Sobha Singh, Hari Singh, Ishwar Singh, Master Gurdit Singh, Kirpal Singh, Jaswant Singh, G. S. Bansal. According to Baijnath Aryan, the Sikh and Hindu bazār folk painters of the Amritsari bazār school were poor, thus they did not have the funds to procure mineral and stone colours for their artistic creations, instead they relied upon aniline colours and would sit without shops or studios on the roadside in Amritsar. The partition of Punjab in 1947 had a devastating impact on its arts. Sikh and Hindu artists had to leave their ancestral homelands, especially in Lahore, due to the upheaval, with many settling in unfamiliar areas such as Bombay or Delhi.

==== Dominance of realism ====
The 20th century became dominated by Sikh painters who were influenced by the Western realistic academic style, chiefly expressed by the two styles developed by Sobha Singh and Kirpal Singh. Whilst Sobha Singh depicted calm, serene, and tranquil scenes (shanta rasa), Kirpal Singh preferred violent, terrifying, aversive and heroic ones (veer rasa, bibhatsa rasa, and bhayanaka rasa). Kirpal's main theme was shahadat tasveeran (martyrdom images), which focused on Sikh martyrology by depicting shaheeds of the religion. Martyrdom images would become very popular there-after, especially after independence.

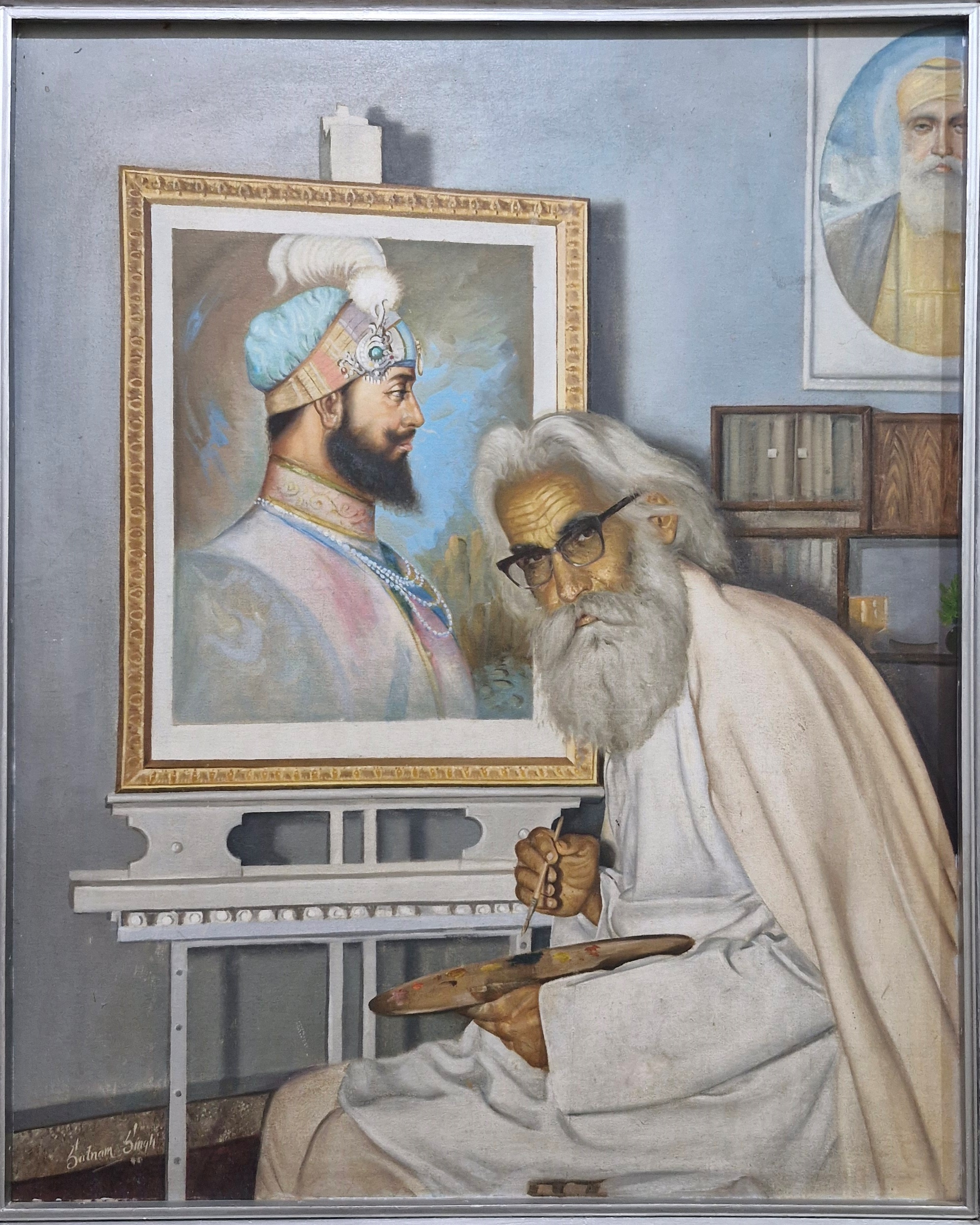
Sobha Singh was a prominent 20th century Sikh painter

Sobha Singh was heavily influenced by Western artwork. He painted on various subjects, such as Sikh gurus. His most well-known works include portraits of the first and tenth Sikh gurus, which can commonly be found adorning the walls of Sikh homes. Sobha's works on the Sikh gurus attempt to portray their spirituality and stability, such as by depicting them haloed, or with half-closed eyes that have a downward gaze toward the heart. He was influenced by texts (such as the Janamsakhis, with him depicting Nanak's travels [udasi] and his companions Mardana and Bala), symbolism (especially from the Pahari school) and folklore. His style also bears Hindu and Buddhist influences in how the figures are shown glancing or gesturing, such as the depiction of the abhaya mudra hand-gesture with the right-hand. A painting of Guru Nanak by Sobha is one of the most popular Sikh paintings. A popular work of his was a rendition depicting the lovers Sohni and Mahiwal, from the Punjabi folklore of the same name. Many of his works were reproduced as calendar art.

G. S. Sohan Singh, son of Gian Singh, was a popular and prominent Sikh artist of the 20th century. Sohan Singh painted various themes, such as portraits of Sikh religious and historical figures, Hindu deities, Sikh sites, and scenes of historical events.

=== Post-independence ===
From the 1950s onward, much Sikh artwork focused on depicting religious and historical themes and scenes related to suffering, trauma, horror, and death involving gurus, heroes, warriors, martyrs, and victims. This was motivated by the SGPC hiring Sikh artists in 1956 to create paintings depicting Sikh history and the foundation of the Central Sikh Museum (Kendriya Sikh Ajaibghar) in 1958 at Amritsar, which sought to house chronological depictions of the lives, battles, and martyrdoms of Sikh gurus, heroes and warriors, with all the paintings being made in the European or Western representational art style (Kanika Singh refers to Sikh oil-paintings depicting historical scenes made in the western academic or realist style as "Sikh history paintings", with the history painting genre originating in 17th century Europe being influenced by classical history and mythology). The Sikh artists hired by the SGPC for the responsibility were Sobha Singh, Kirpal Singh, Gian Singh Naqqash, S. G. Thakur Singh, G. S. Bansal, G. S. Sohan Singh, and Satpal Singh Danish. The project by the SGPC would influence later Sikh history painters, and bazaar, calendar, and popular artists. Sikh history paintings became available at shrines, bazaars, and museums. These paintings are often copied by other artists and an artist may create multiple copies of their work for more than one client, especially in the case of calendar art.

Outside of the SGPC, other Sikh organisations founded missionary museums, such as the Bhai Mati Das Museum (BMDM; Chandni Chowk, Delhi) and Baba Baghel Singh Sikh Heritage Multimedia Museum (BBSSHMM; New Delhi) associated with Delhi Sikh Gurdwara Management Committee (DSGMC). In Anandpur Sahib, the Sri Guru Teg Bahadur Sikh Museum (SGTBSM), Historical Picture Gallery (HPG), Virasat-e-Khalsa (VEK), and Khalsa Heritage Centre (KHC) were established. In Amritsar is the War Museum (WM). The paintings within Sikh museums tended to have two sponsors who commissioned their creation, they are gurdwara management committees (such as the SGPC and DSGMC) and the government.

In independent India, bodies commissioning new Sikh artwork tended to be Sikh museums (with their resident artist), private organisations (chiefly P&S Bank), and the government. These three sources of Sikh art patronage frequently overlapped with one another due to individuals being involved in more than one source, thus are described as "intersecting threads of patronage" by Kanika Singh. Beginning in 1974 under the guise of Inderjit Singh, Makhan Singh, and Satbir Singh, the Punjab & Sind Bank hired artists to create artwork based on Sikh heritage for its annually published illustrated calendar. Some of the artists hired to create artwork for the bank's calendar included Devender Singh, Mehar Singh, Bodhraj, Kirpal Singh, Rahi Mohinder Singh, Jarnail Singh, and Amolak Singh. These paintings were created to promote the teachings of the Sikh gurus and inform the younger generations. Sometimes a calendar issue and its associated artwork was dedicated to a specific topic, such as the 1975 issue covering historical Sikh women while the 1976 issue was based on kirtaniyas, specifically historical Sikh musicians. Sometimes a historical event from Sikh history was first-ever popularly depicted in the P&S Bank's calendar art. In 1980, the formerly private bank was nationalised by the government of India but it continued to publish illustrated Sikh calendar artwork with commissioned works until the early 2000s, after which paintings in its calendars were replaced with photographs. The artwork created for the bank's calendar was later donated on the initiative of Harbans Singh to the Bhai Mati Das Museum in New Delhi. Another private company that commissioned Sikh calendar art was the agricultural cooperative Punjab Markfed, which published an illustrated Sikh calendar in 1974 that was distributed in the Indian Parliament, causing controversy but the calendar was defended as being a "historical document" by Zail Singh with G. S. Tohra of the SGPC defending the work as a vivid recreation of Sikh history.

Many images portraying martyrs and scenes of the traumatic events in pre-colonial, colonial, and independent India, such as the oppressions by the Mughal and Afghan administrations, Sikh freedom fighters during colonial-rule, the partition of Punjab, the Punjab Suba movement, Operation Blue Star, Operation Woodrose, Operation Black Thunder, anti-Sikh riots, and the Khalistan movement and Punjab insurgency were created to remember perceived martyrs of the faith, as testimonies to past hardship, and to educate the youth on those events to impart a lesson, with past suffering being used as a tool to instill current courage and pride in Sikhs. The Shahadat Tasveeran Gallery of the Central Sikh Museum contains portraits of Dharam Yudh Morcha and Khalistani figures, including militants (kharkus) and assassins to venerate and visualise the sant-sipahi ideal. Meanwhile, the ideal Sikh woman in the works are assigned a gender role as a supporting daughter, wife or mother of a martyr. Thus women are relegated to a silent role in an art tradition dominated by masculinity portrayed in the form of macho, male heroes or martyrs. According to Sayan Gupta, these trauma-influenced artworks invoke a sense of identity-consolidation and self-reflection in Sikhs, and serve the following five purposes:

- remembering/commemorating past difficulties and martyrs
- transform history into a physical representation
- to impart religious or moral lessons on youth
- to educate non-Sikhs on Sikh religion and history
- to depict Sikhism and Sikhs as an independent religion, culture, and community from Hinduism and Hindus

Kanika Singh notes that much of the modern Sikh artwork is anachronistic, such as by depicting historical Sikh figures from before the foundation of the Khalsa in the late 17th century in the Khalsa form, such as with full-beards, uncut hair, and turbans despite a lack of historical evidence for such practices in pre-Khalsa Sikhism. She notes that traditional Sikh artwork from the late 19th century, such as in the form of murals, miniatures, and religious prints, were more diverse in their depictions when compared to the Khalsa paradigm promoted in modern Sikh oil-painting. Furthermore, there is an overemphasis on religious ideals as a factor of change in the evolution of Sikhism rather than other social, political, economic and cultural factors.Furthermore, in martyrdom or battle paintings the Sikh characters are often depicted as fair-skinned, physically attractive, noble, and pure (being dressed in white, yellow, or blue) whilst their enemies are depicted as dark-skinned, grotesque, and wearing black or green (with green in particular being associated with Muslims). Kanika Singh critiques these modern paintings at museums for underplaying the relationship that Sikhs have with other religions and the evolution of the community overtime, instead being Khalsa-centric and minimizing other expressions in the Sikh community and other castes (such as the lower-caste Sikhs and their relationship with heterodoxical deras), with an over-emphasis on "heroic deeds" such as martyrdom and the gurus. She also notes that Sikh museums rarely cover contemporary history such as the 1947 partition and 1984 incidents aside from two exceptions (the Central Sikh Museum and Virsat-e-Khalsa). While the Central Sikh Museum displays paintings related to Operation Blue Star and the Khalistan movement, Sikh museums in Delhi shy away from such depictions, this is due to the regional political and caste differences between Amritsar and Delhi which reveal internal tensions in the Sikh community (such as Delhi being dominated by urban Khatris while Amritsar is dominated by rural Jatts). The partition may not be depicted as much due to a sense of humiliation of being victims but also as perpetrators of violence. Rather than lacking a historical basis, Sikh history paintings are shortcoming in regards to critical perspective.

==== Present ====
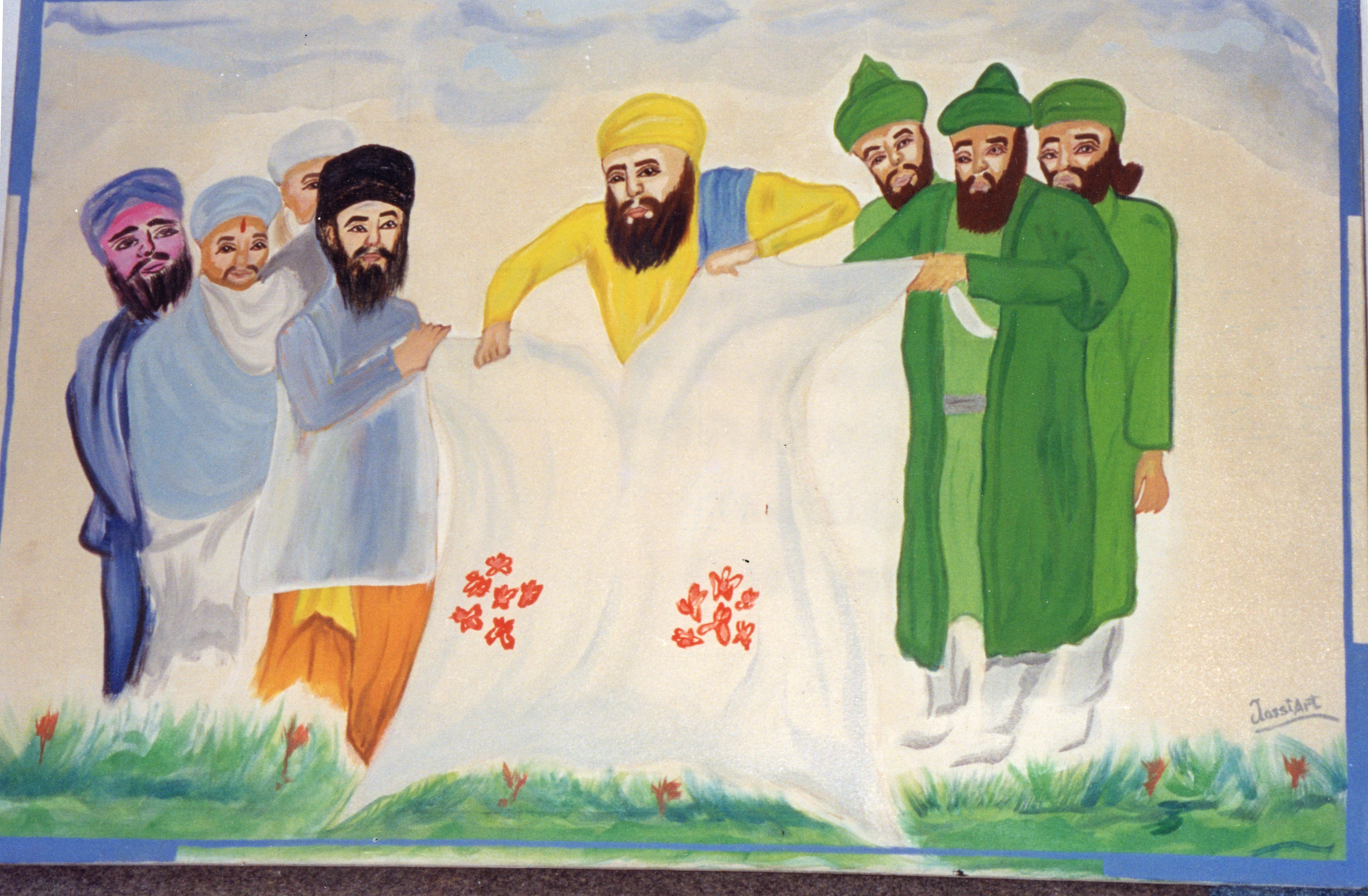
Painting of Guru Nanak at Kartarpur, Pakistan. Photographed in May 2003. Kept in the Amarjit Chandan collection.

Modern Sikh artwork exists as oil paintings, prints, posters, pamphlets, souvenirs, popular art, calendar art (wall and pocket calendars), book covers, book illustrations, magazines, storybooks, comics, canvases, sculptures, banners, posters, clothing, photographs, films, songs and music videos, animation, advertisements, academic works, and social media images and can be found at private residences, museums, gurdwaras, and on internet forums. At Sikh sites, artwork is displayed in the temple or langar hall while Sikh museums are known as an ajaibghars. Sikh art is the third largest collection in the subcontinent after Hindu and Islamic art but it remains severely under-studied and under-appreciated in academia.

The Singh Twins are a pair producing Sikh artwork in the present-day. Jatinder Singh Durhailay is a modern artist who has revived the traditional Sikh style of miniature paintings. Gurpreet Singh Mankoo is a modern artist painting in the traditional Sikh muralist style. The current artist active creating works for the Central Sikh Museum in Amritsar is Gurvinderpal Singh, who holds a disparaging view toward traditional miniature painting and prefers the realist style. Many modern Sikh and Punjabi paintings are recreations of earlier, popular works rather than being entirely original. Emily de Klerk, who feels a personal affinity to the Sikhs, is a Dutch artist who draws portrait sketches and takes photographs of Sikh figures (usually men).

Sikh art has sold at increasingly high prices at auctions, including at Sotheby’s, Roseberys, Bonhams, Lyon & Turnbull, and Christie's. (Note: Sources:) This increasing demand and pricing is partly spurred on by a new-generation of Sikh art collectors.

== Manuscript ==
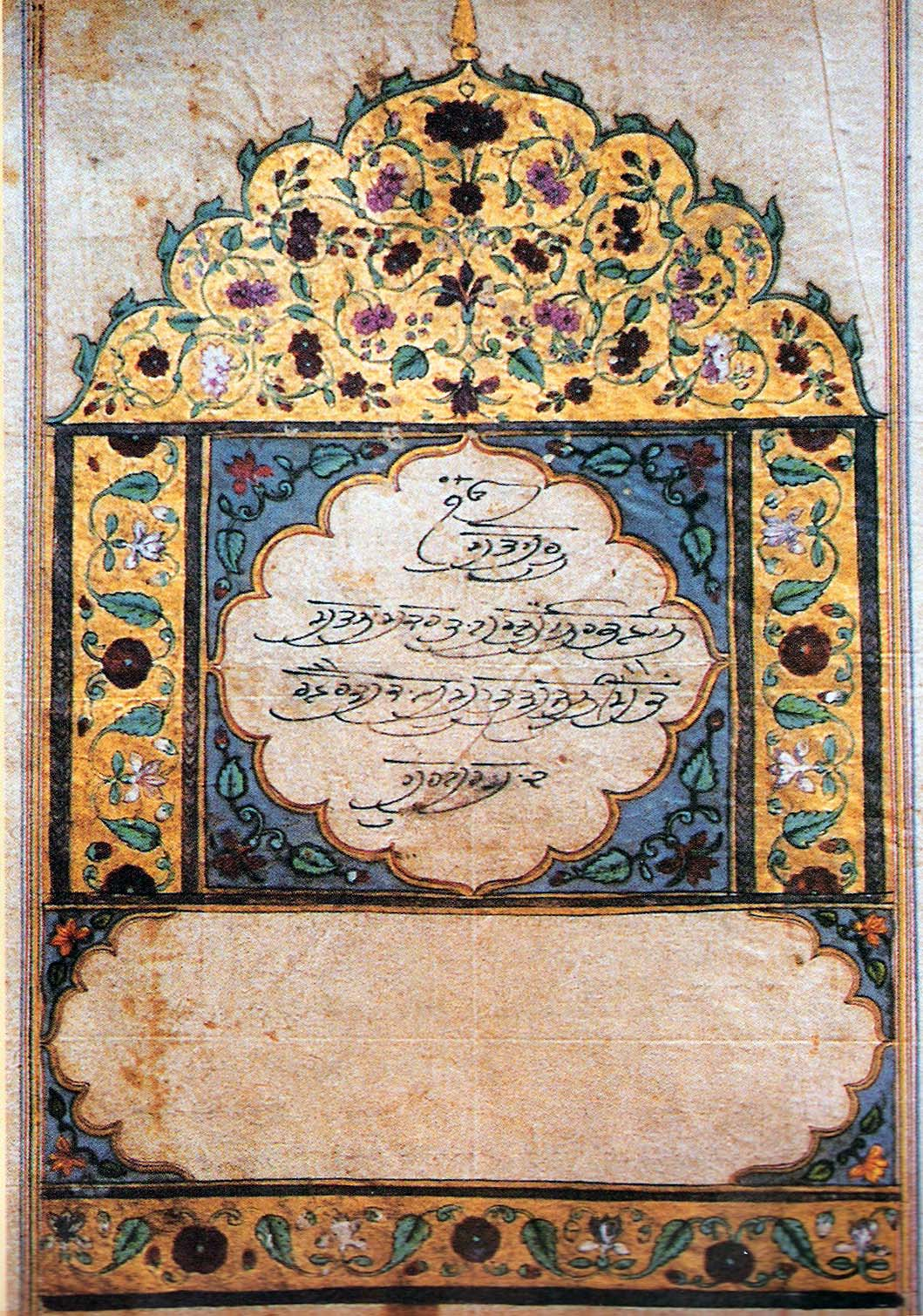
Illuminated Adi Granth folio with nishan of Guru Gobind Singh. The manuscript is of the Lahore recension, late 17th to early 18th century.

Illustrated and illuminated manuscripts form a large corpus of Sikh art. It is perhaps the earliest evidence of Sikh intrigues into the world of art. However, not much is currently known about the artists, scribes, and patrons of this field of historical Sikh artwork.

Researcher Jeevan Singh Deol divides Sikh manuscriptural artwork into three categories:

1. Early manuscripts with nisans or nishans (Note: The word nishan (also spelt as nisan) comes from a Persian word meaning "sign" or "emblem". In the Sikh tradition, it is used to refer to the signature or autograph of a highly-reputed religious figure, such as a Sikh guru, often by scribing the Mul Mantar.)
2. Minakari or belbuta – manuscripts with illumination, decoration, or floral adornment
3. Illustrated manuscripts proper – manuscripts with illustrations

A nisan or nishan is a piece of a paper with the handwriting of a Sikh guru included in the opening section of historical Sikh codices. Sikh manuscript art was influenced early-on in the early 17th century by the Islamicate art traditions. This influence led to elaborate and intricate geometric designs in the early 17th century Sikh manuscript works. By the later 17th century, the geometric designs which characterized earlier written works of the precursory period were replaced with floral motifs and designs. The issued Hukamnamas (edicts) and signed Nishans (signature of a Sikh guru by scribing the Mul Mantar) of the human guru-period contained illuminations and illustrations with both geometric and floral motifs. Nishans were commonly appended to the opening folios of early Sikh scriptural manuscripts, consisting of the handwritten signature of a Sikh guru on a piece of paper. Sectarian groups, such as the Minas, also produced illustrated manuscripts. By the late 18th century, Kashmiri-style manuscript painting became prevalent amongst the Sikhs and were circulated around the Punjab. The mid-to-late 18th century Kashmir-style manuscript art is characterized by "luminous work's vine and floral adornment characteristic". During the reign of Ranjit Singh, many manuscripts of Sikh scriptures were illuminated and written with gold, manuscripts illuminated in such a manner are known as a sunehri bir ("golden volume").

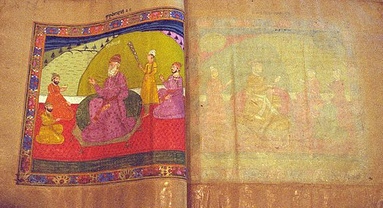
Sikh manuscript painting

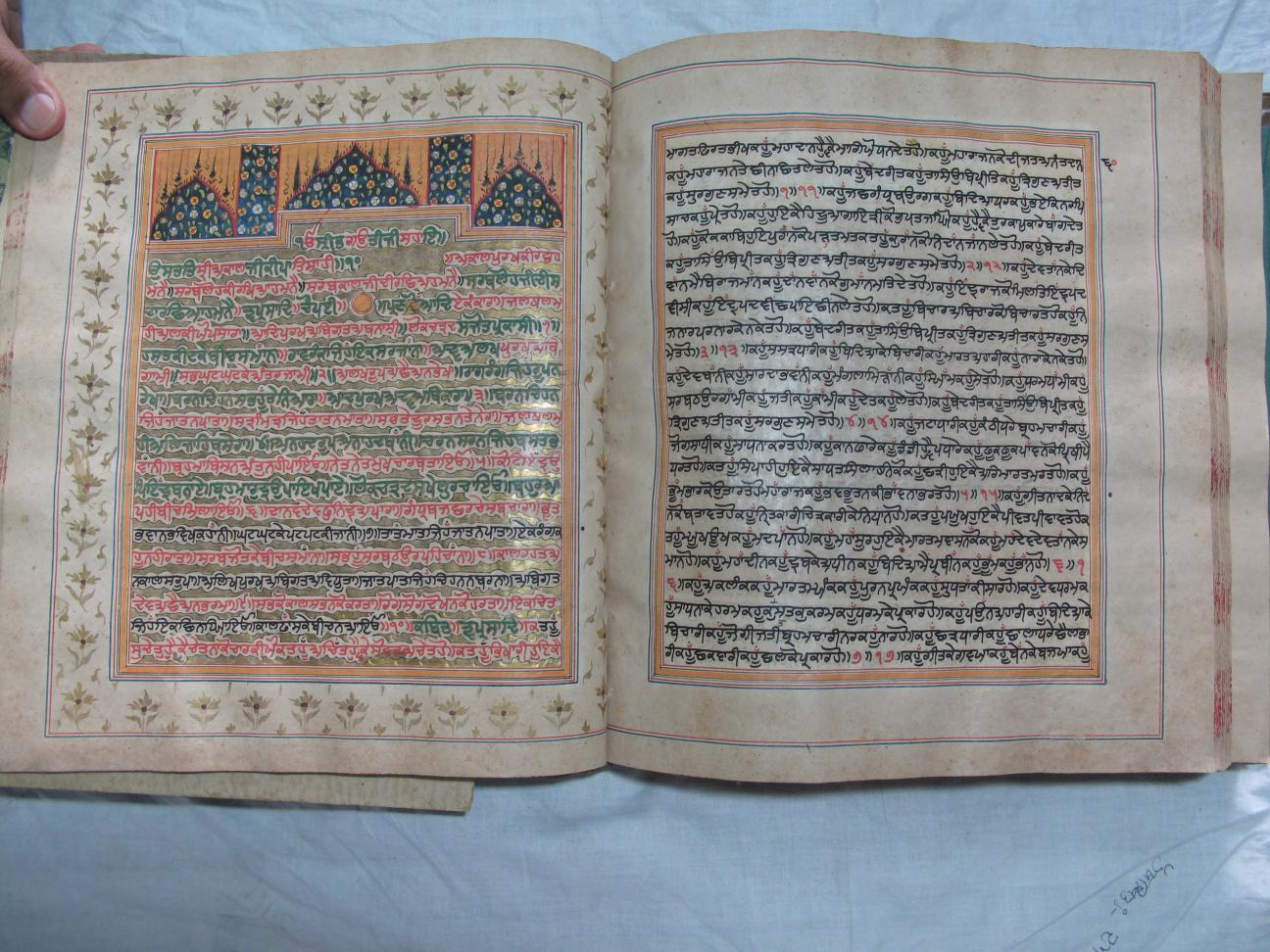
Akal Ustat from the 1765 "Patna Missal" Dasam Granth Manuscript

Due to the lack of printing press technology, copies of Sikh scriptures were meticously carried out manually by-hand of a scribe. Completing such a task of writing an entire scripture could take months or even years. Many artists would decorate these handwritten manuscripts through the use of imitation work with calligraphic font with precise focus on even a single letter. Either or both the drawing lines and margin lines were adorned by artists in some corpuses. On certain folios throughout a volume, there could exist manuscript paintings depicting Sikh gurus. On other pages, there could exist text with roundels containing portraits of Sikh religious figures (usually gurus) surrounding the body of text. Oftentimes there is an elaborately and artistically designed border surrounding the body of text, these borders may contain floral motifs overlaid on various coloured backgrounds and surroundings within the border. Whilst Islamic illumination works usually showcase geometric patterns with blue and gold, Sikh illumination can differ, with one surviving example of illumination being a floral design with yellow, gold, and blue.

Beginning in the late 18th century and continuing onward to the 19th century, Sikh and Punjabi illustrated and illuminated texts were influenced by the Kashmiri style. The Kashmiri style had differying sub-styles, such as a hastily-made bazaar styles to works made under elite patronage. It can be further divided into a Persinate style and an Indian style. Surviving texts originate from a geographically vast area, from Central Asia (Afghanistan) to Patna to Burhanpur. The Kashmiri artists often followed set templates for illustrating texts despite patrons or scribes altering the content of said manuscripts. A common motif was that of a circular or lotus-petal arrangement of figuratives around a central roundel with text, decorated with vine patterns and floral decoratives. An alternative template is that of illustrated, sequential panels grouped around the text, whose central area is scallop-shaped. Lines may alternate between black and gold ink. According to Kavita Singh, beginning in the mid-18th century the Indic pothi began to be elaborately decorated in the Kashmiri-style, which became the paramount style of decorated Guru Granth Sahib manuscripts by the early 19th century. In the mid-to-late 18th century, these Kashmiri-style manuscripts featured vine and floral decorations rather than geometric patterns that were characteristic of Islamicate styles, such as sarlauh and 'unvan.

Presentations of the Japji Sahib composition within a decorated manuscript could vary by how the work was written. Illustrated manuscripts often feature depictions of the Sikh gurus and Indic deities (often Devis, Saraswati, and Ganesha). The manuscripts featuring paintings of Indic deities may have been prepared for Hindu patrons or were utilized at Hindu folk-shrines. Despite that, one example of a manuscript featuring Indic deities was prepared for a Sikh religious lineage's member. However, some sections of the Sikh community were opposed for the inclusion of Indic deities in Sikh texts and thus excluded them from some of their works. Many 19th century manuscripts depict the Sikh gurus and Indic deities together.

The art of preparing illustrated and illuminated manuscripts of scriptures died-out amongst Sikhs at the end of the 19th century due to the introduction of the printing-press, which replaced the practice and patronization of handwriting manuscripts. According to Jeevan Singh Deol, the illuminated and illustrated manuscript tradition died out in the second quarter of the 19th century due it being supplanted by lithography and type-printing, which replaced artists and illustrators. Many extant manuscripts of the Guru Granth Sahib were lost during the course of the 20th century, rendering study of this field of Sikh art to the surviving corpus, many of which are unprovenanced.

=== Janamsakhi ===
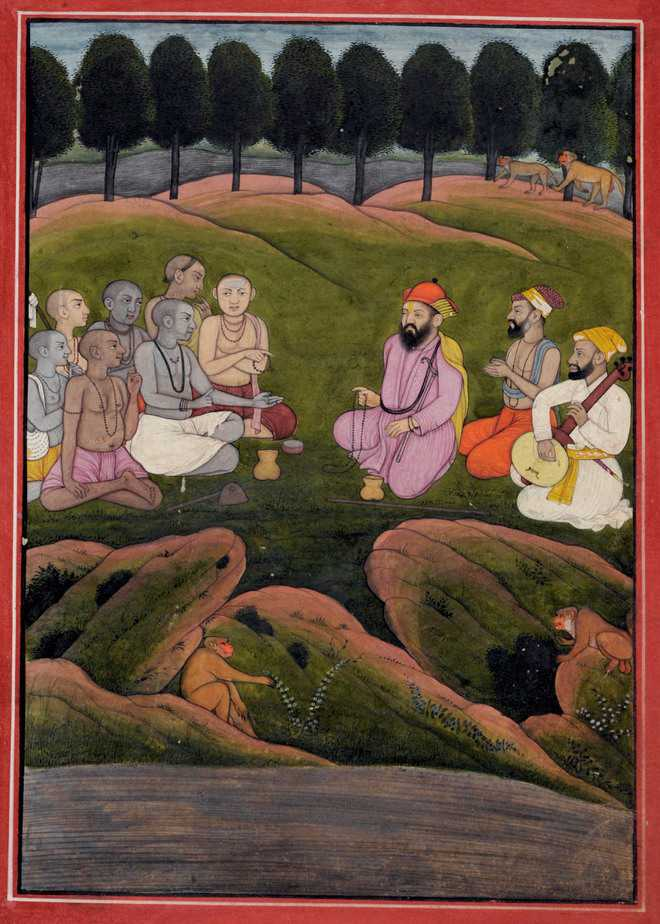
Guru Nanak engaged in an interfaith dialogue, Janamsakhi painting.

The Janamsakhi literature produced was often elaborately illustrated with paintings on the folios, each depicting a life story of the first Guru. It is one of the earliest sources of Sikh art. Composition of illustrated Janamsakhi series of manuscripts flourished in the 17th and 18th centuries. Alongside hagiographical accounts of the life of the first guru, Nanak, written mostly in Gurmukhi script, they also contained paintings illustrating supposed events from his life. The paintings of the Bhai Bala tradition of Janamsakhis was influenced by Sufi stylisms. Guru Nanak is often depicted between the boundaries of Hinduism and Islam, which can be deduced with special regard and attention made to his attire in the paintings.

The earliest illustrated Janamsakhi manuscripts are as follows:

- A manuscript of the Bhai Bala tradition held in the private collection of P. N. Kapoor of Delhi, containing 29 illustrations, dated to 1658
- A manuscript called the Bagharian manuscript, containing 42 illustrations, dated to 1724
- A manuscript called the B40 manuscript, containing 57 paintings out of 231 folios in-total, dated to 1733. The patron, artist, and scribe of this work is known.

The art of illustrated Janamsakhi manuscripts declined following the introduction of the printing press in Punjab during the 1870s.

== Miniatures, oil paintings, watercolours, and portraitures ==
Sikh miniature painting was derived from the Pahari school of painting. Many Sikh paintings tend to depict rajas, nobles and courtiers but there also works showing common folks going about their daily professions or way-of-life.

Portraiture is believed to have commenced during the guruship period of Guru Hargobind, continuing until the guruship of Guru Gobind Singh. As the court of the Sikh gurus grew in importance, so did its attraction to painters. A Lahori painter by the name of Allah Bakhsh painted based on themes from the life of Krishna, incorporating mystical motifs, aesthetically pleasing colour selection, and fine craftsmanship.

Maharaja Ranjit Singh had invited European artists into his realm, perhaps as a means to develop cordial relations with the British. These arriving European artists would introduce their foreign techniques and styles to the Indic painting landscape, which led to the local artists becoming influenced by them, with some natives outright adopting European styles of painting. Their cheaper methods of producing portraiture work which was uptaken by local Indians would lead to the developing of the later Bazaar School. Some European artists would work within the Sikh state and shortly after its annexation into the Company Raj include August Theodore Schoefft, Emily Eden, Baron Hugel, Helen, and William Carpenter. Ranjit Singh is said to have disfavoured portraiture due to his physical disfigurement from smallpox and other handicaps. However, despite the reigning monarch having a personal distate to being painted in the form of portraiture, some works of his likeness were still produced. These surviving portraits of the Sikh ruler were done by Delhite, Jodhpuri, Pahari, and a few European painters. During the rule of the Sikh Empire, particular importance was placed on portraiture. Emily Eden recounted that Ranjit Singh responded positively when she gifted him a portrait she made of Queen Victoria.

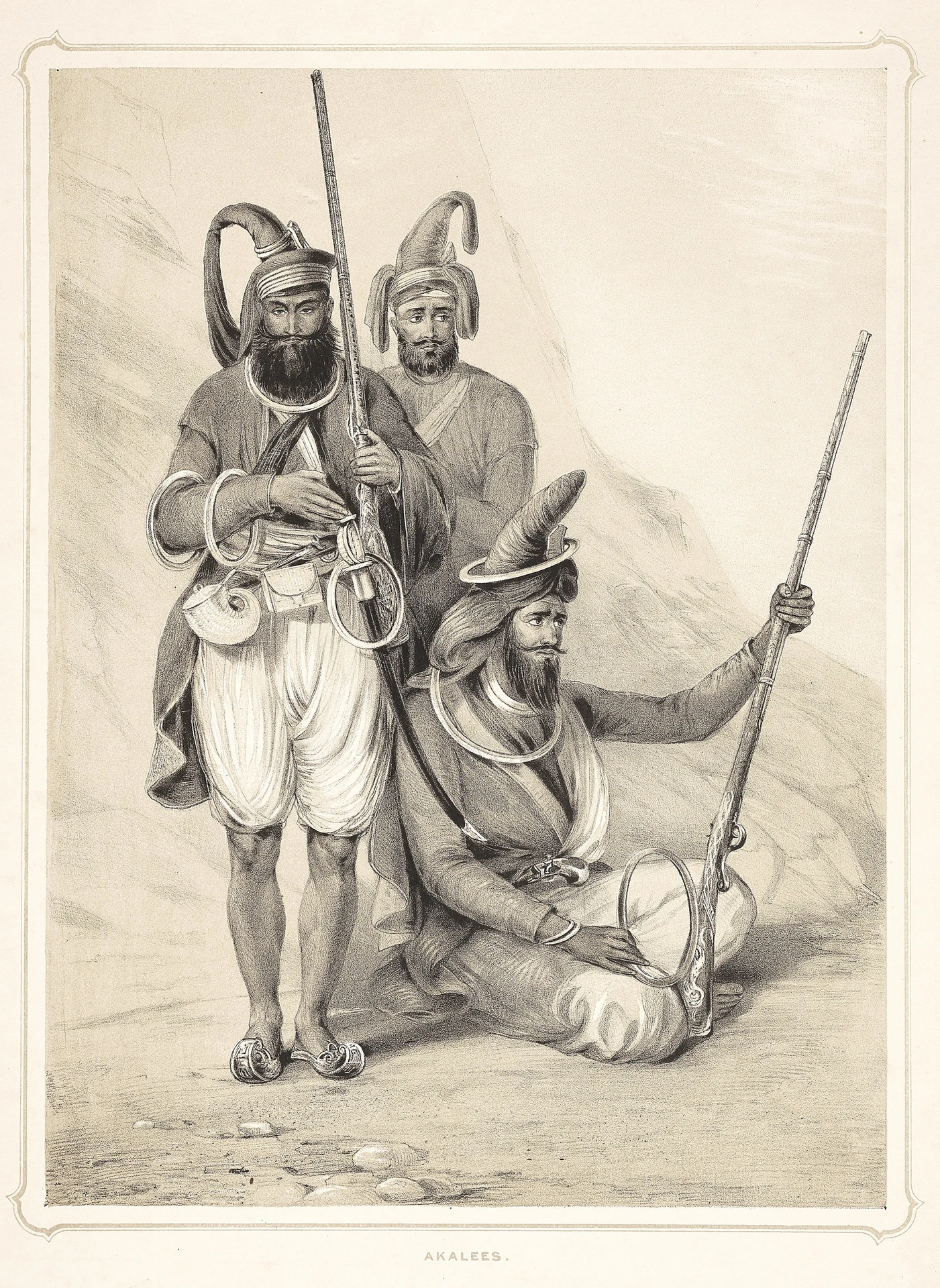
“Akalees (Akalis)”, from "Portraits of the Princes and People of India”, by Emily Eden, 1844, chromolithograph

August Schoefft introduced the method of large-sized, oil painting to the Punjabi landscape, which led to slight influences on this works produced in this final period of Sikh rule. Schoefft had arrived to the Sikh court during the reign of Maharaja Sher Singh, where he remained for about a year's time painting portraitures. Emily Eden, another European artist, had also travelled to the Punjab during the height of the Sikh Empire and created works depicting many of the people and places she witnessed on her journey. Among her works include a rare portraiture drawing of Ranjit Singh seated cross-legged in a chair, with the work showing some influence from traditional Indian art styles, this drawing was later painted by L. Dickinson. Thus, the paintings during the reign of Ranjit Singh incorporated both local and foreign methods and stylisms. William Carpenter would produce various watercolours of local Sikh scenes shortly after the colonization of the Sikh territory.

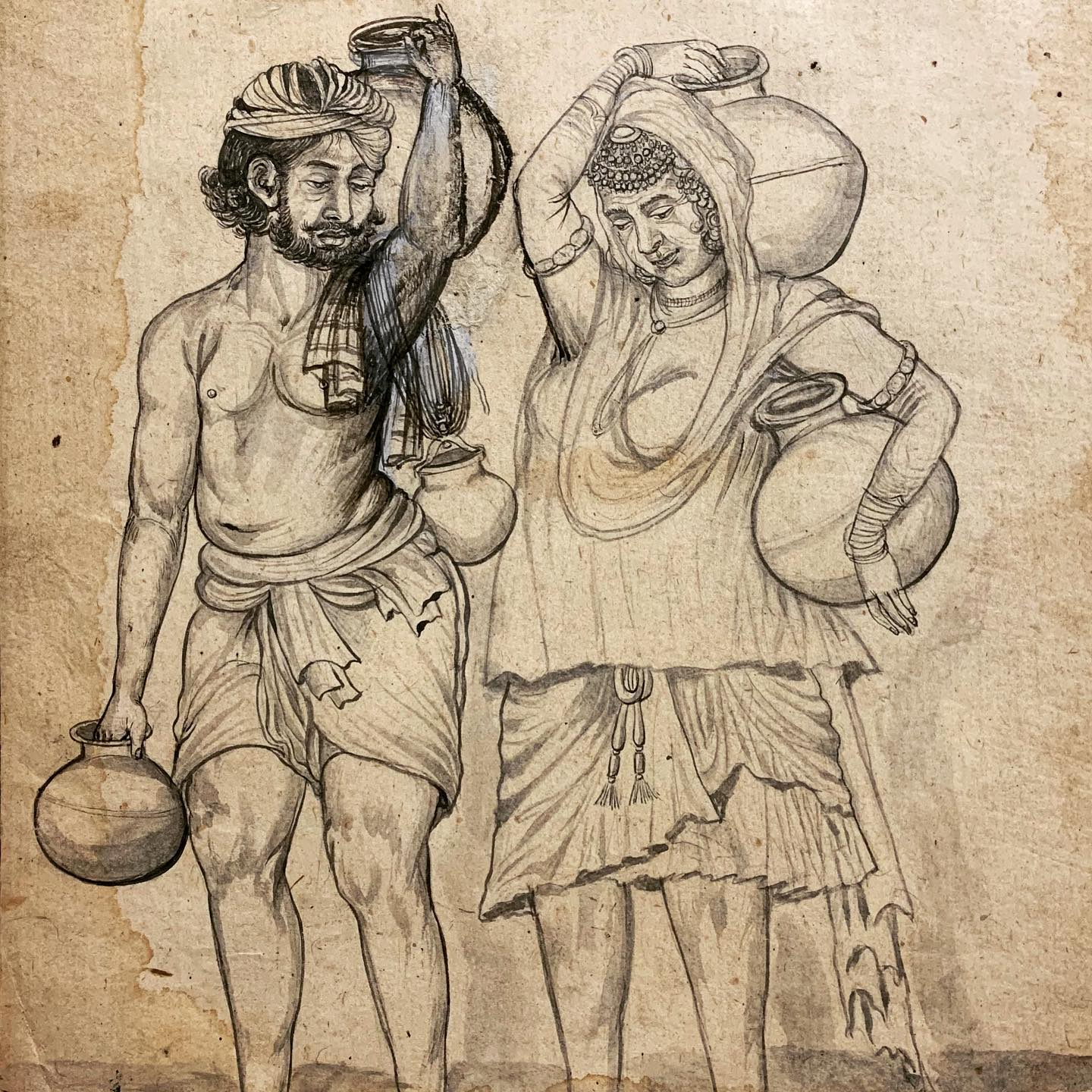
'A Couple Carrying Water Pitchers', by Kehar Singh, Punjab, circa 19th century. Toor Collection.

Oil painting by local Punjabi and Sikh artists can perhaps be traced back to the 1830s and attributed to the artists Jeevan Ram and Hasn-al-Din. Both had been in the entourage of William Bentinck, whereupon thereafter they came to develop a preference for bigger-sized oil paintings over the small, traditional miniature paintings local to the region. Among prominent local artists of Ranjit Singh's state, the names of Imam Bakhash, Kishan Singh, and Bishan Singh are to be noted. All three of them had worked in the Kangra-Sikh style of painting.

Imam Bakhsh of Lahore executed commissions for the Europeans employed by the Sikh Empire's military, such as Claude-Auguste Court, Jean-Francois Allard, and Jean-Baptiste Ventura, however no known self-portraits of Imam Bakhsh have come-to-light.

Kishan Singh was skilled in illustration magnifying designs whereas his brother Bishan Singh was talented in depicting courtly durbar scenery. One of the most important of the court painters of Ranjit Singh was Kehar Singh, who had no equal in importance. Both Kehar Singh and Kapur Singh would depict everyday life scenes of the local populace, such as different occupational workers in varying crafts and trades. As to Kehar Singh's work, there was European influence on the effects of light and shade in his art pieces.

Kishan Singh was a Sikh artist who had been employed by royal courts located in Amritsar, Kapurthala, and Lahore. Whilst working in Lahore, Kishan Singh helped facilitate the arrival of other artists. Kishan's son, Kapur Singh, also rose to become an accomplished artist in his own right. Kapur Singh closely observed the European painters whilst he was in Kapurthala, and made detailed note of their usage of oil painting procedures. After observing the foreign artists, Kapur Singh would adopt their techniques of oil and watercolour painting and become a master in it himself. However, Kapur also delved in producing miniatures.

In Punjab during the late 19th to early 20th century, the prevailing Kangra style of painting had lost its importance and been replaced with a newer form of painting called the Bazaar School, which was similar to Western and folk art. The Bazaar School would produce works showcasing Indic mythological and historical themes and motifs in the form of Calendar art. In the 20th century, local artists were producing works of normal landscapes of the region, mythology, epics, and legends. Sikh artists by that point were employing lithography and woodcut method to produce popular Sikh pictorial artwork. Prior to the introduction of the printing press, indulgence in painting was relegated to the sole domain of the rich due to its expense. After the printing press' introduction to the Sikhs, the common masses were able to luxuriate in paintings through woodcut and lithograph-based art which could be cheaply mass-produced in comparison to the traditional art methods of the past.

== Murals ==
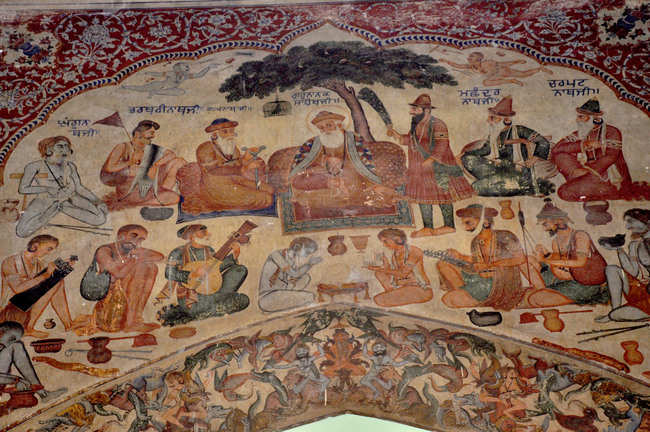
Fresco depicting Guru Nanak in-discussion with Nath Yogis from Akhara Bala Nand in Amritsar. Many prominent Nath Yogis are identified with Gurmukhi inscriptions in the artwork.

The art of mural painting dates back to ancient times in India, with early surviving specimens being the Ajanta Caves' frescoes. There exists very old murals within the Punjab region itself, with an extant example being the wall paintings of the Lahore Fort, commissioned during the reign of the Mughal emperor Akbar. Even though Islam is iconoclastic, many Islamic patrons of the art of murals existed, which helped develop the artform in the Punjab. However, Islamic murals focused on floral motifs with less attention paid to figuratives of humans and other animals. Sikh wall paintings (known as mohra-kashi or kandha-chitara in Punjabi) started gaining popularity in the 18th century and flourished during the 19th century, especially during the reign of Maharaja Ranjit Singh. Most of the Sikh wall paintings depicted the Sikh gurus, especially Guru Nanak and Guru Gobind Singh. However, very few works of this form are extant in the modern era due to them being destroyed by renovations or lost due to neglect and deterioration. In the past, murals covered the walls of important buildings, such as gurdwaras, samadhis, deras, and akharas. Residential structures, such as havelis, dharamshalas, and bungas, were also plastered with fresco works.

Baba Atal Frescoes in Amritsar

Naqqashi muralists developed their own lingo and vernacular terms to differentiate their various themes and designs. The most prominent design category was referred to as Dehin, which is described as "a medium of expression of the imaginative study of the artist's own creation of idealized forms". The base of dehin is known as Gharwanjh. Gharwanjh is a "decorative device involving knotted grapples between animals". The gharwanjh designs of the Golden Temple features cobras, lions, and elephants holding one another or carrying floral vases which feature fruit and fairies as decoration. The decorative border of the dehin is known as Patta, usually utilizing creepers for its design. Furthermore, some dehin feature designs incorporating aquatic creatures.

Themes and patterns of floral and foliage designs are prominent in Sikh murals. Geometry was an important consideration in the Sikh art of mohrakashi. Thick brush strokes were used by the mohrakashi artists. Brushes made of goat hair and between 1 and 5 and squirrel hair brushes between 1 and 4 were used by the traditional Sikh muralists. Earthly colours were produced for the purpose of withstanding the lime. Animal motifs, such as representations of peacocks, tigers, deer, and other creatures, were used to "accentuate the substantial regional essence of the painting".

The oldest extant Sikh mural art works are the ones found painted on the walls of Gurdwara Sri Guru Tegh Bahadur Sahib in Bahadurgarh, dated between 1670 and 1720, and the samadh of Bhai Dalla, located near Takht Damdama Sahib in Talwandi Sabo, dated between 1710 and 1740. In the era of the Sikh Confederacy, various leaders of the component Misls sponsored the art of murals. The houses of residents were decorated with murals, using lime plaster overlaid on the brickwork of the structure, depicting Sikh gurus, Sikh chieftains, or various episodes from Sikh history or Indic mythology.

Amid the murals based on profane subjects, depictions of scenes from traditional Punjabi folklore are commonplace, such as Heer Ranjha, Mirza Sahiban, Sohni Mahiwal, Sassi Pannu, Laila Majnun, Raja Rasalu, and more. There are also paintings based upon traditional folk ballads, such as Puran Bhagat. There are further depictions of various royal figures, such as Rani Jindan. Many Punjabi wall paintings depict women and girls in the process of a variety of actions, such as feeding parrots, peacocks, or bucks. Women are also depicted fondling pets or writing love letters in these wall paintings.

Usually displayed less conspicuously, there were also wall paintings depicting sexual or erotic themes. It was a common practice to decorate the walls of Islamic and Hindu palaces with erotic scenes. The Sikh royalty and nobility during the reign of the Sikh Empire had their residences embellished with these erotic wall paintings. General Paolo Avitabile had his private residence quarters decorated with figures of scantily clad dancing girls and Indic deities in the act of making love. At the Rani Mahal of erstwhile Nabha State, there are wall paintings of couples having sex in various positions, settings, and emotions based upon the Koka Shastra treatise. These erotic murals were limited mostly to the areas frequented by the upper classes of the Punjabi society at the time.

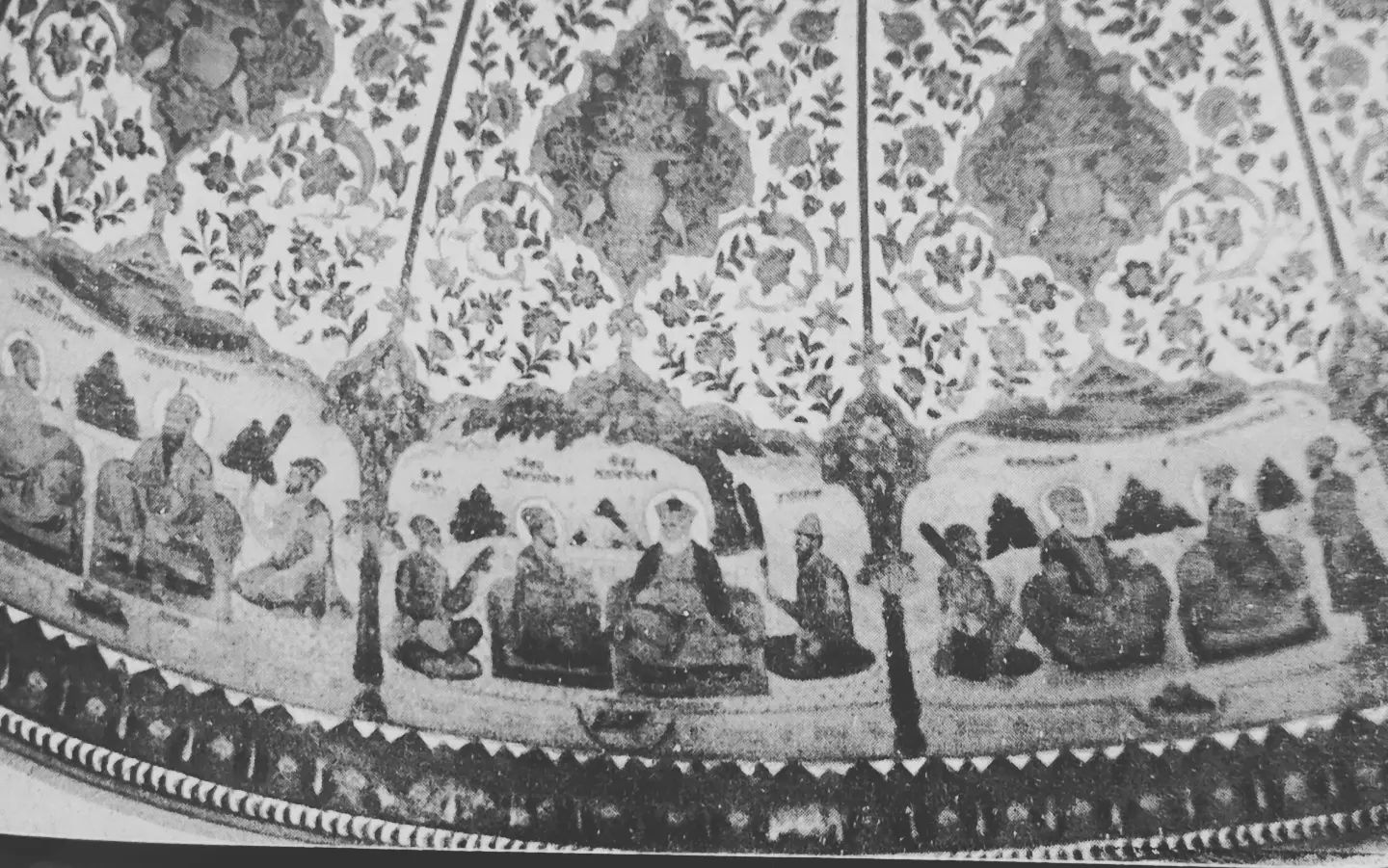
Photograph of murals formerly located on the ceiling of the central dome of the Golden Temple, Amritsar, ca.1925. Scenes of various Sikh gurus meeting together are depicted. No longer extant.

The art of frescoes was introduced by the artist Bhai Kehar Singh Musawar under the patronage of Maharaja Ranjit Singh during the era of the Sikh Empire. Kehar Singh was responsible for decorating the interiors of Ranjit Singh's Lahori palace with frescoes. After Ranjit Singh witnessed the fine artwork of Kehar Singh, he decided to commission him for beautifying the Golden Temple shrine in Amritsar to embellish it with mural work (such as the domes, walls, and roofs). Hari Singh Nalwa and the Attariwalas were patrons of mural artwork. When Ranjit Singh invaded Chiniot in 1810, he came to learn from one of his commanders that the havelis of the region were elaborately decorated by mohrakashi (fresco) work. Thereafter the monarch decided, as a means of devoting himself faithfully to the shrine, to decorate the interiors of the Harmandir Sahib complex in Amritsar with naqqashi art. Muslim artisans from Chiniot and Faizabad were invited to participate in decorating the interior of the Sikh shrine. Vaishnavist artists also assisted initially. The beautification project was entrusted to Bhai Sant Singh. An example of Islamicate influence leftover from these initial Muslim Naqqash artists is the Irani motif of two or four big flowers arranged sparsely. Artistic specimens leftover from the impact that the initial Vaishnavist Naqqash artists can also be witnessed, such as patterns with bold flowers and leaves to portray Krishna's raslila. As per Madanjit Kaur, whilst the Sikh School of mural painting took influences from both Islamic and Hindu traditions, it became its own tradition in its own right with its own manner of depicting and settings. An example of a difference that Amritsari Sikh murals have against the Pahari murals is related to the background, where the landscape is often omitted in Amritsari murals but is an important aspect of Pahari murals.

Names of some prominent figures who helped start and develop the Sikh mohrakashi school includes Din Mohammad, Jawahar Latuni, Dacha, Sharaf-ud-Din, Malha Ram, and others. Due to their non-Sikh background, these Muslim or Hindu artists had to delve into Sikh philosophy to better match their objective when painting for Sikh settings. Baba Kehar Singh Musawar, a Sikh artist, was an innovator in the mohrakashi school and is believed to have been the first to introduce avian (bird) designs to the frescoes. General Jean-François Allard and General Jean-Baptiste Ventura, two European men who worked in the Sikh military, had their personal residences decorated with a fresco depicting each in the midst of battle.

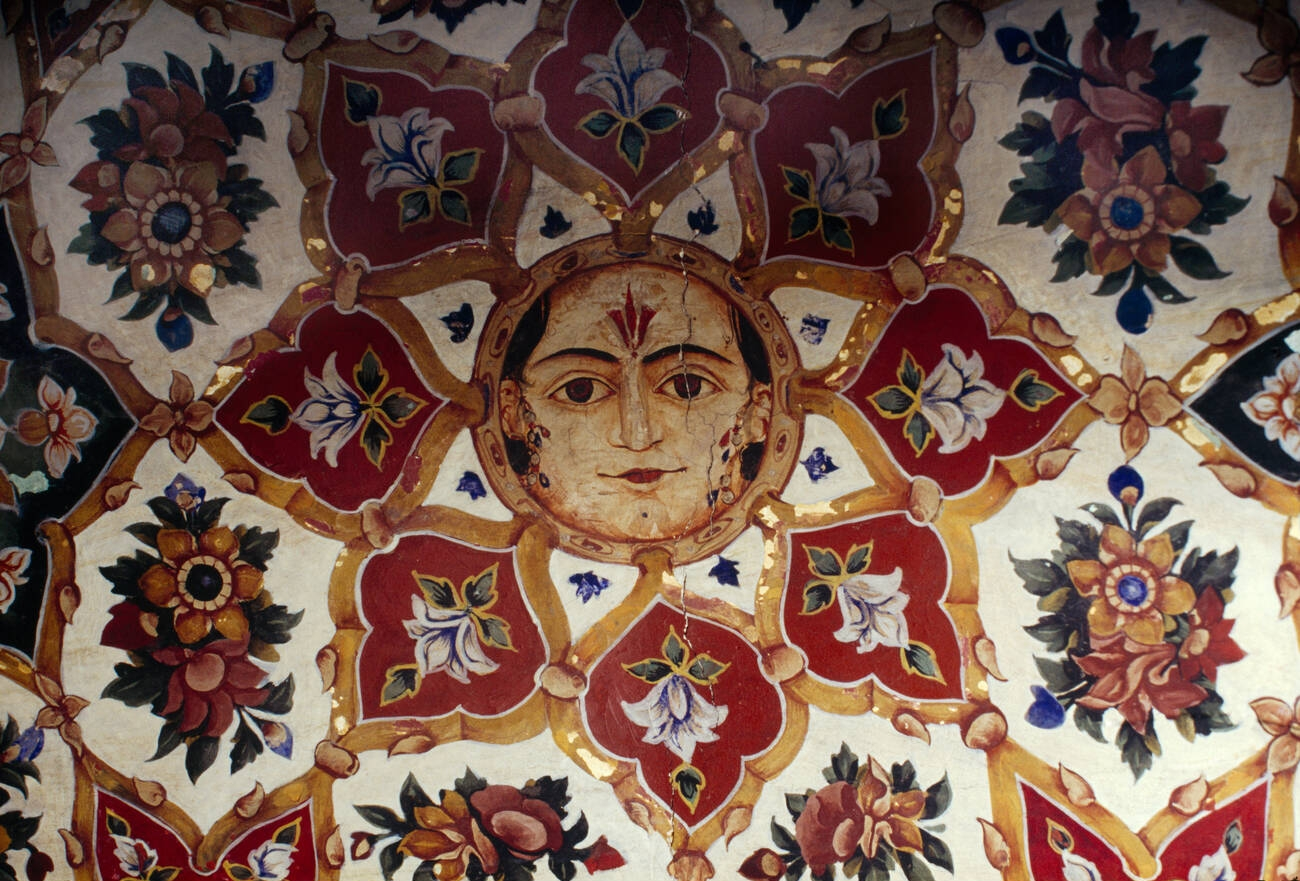
Ceiling fresco of Surya Dev iconography from Gurdwara Baba Atal, Amritsar

Amritsar city had become an important centre for Sikh and Punjabi mural art. British cultural influences led to the diffusion of Western styles and other influences upon the local murals. Murals did not vary in popularity along religious lines, as Sikhs, Hindus, and Muslims all employed the artform and were enthusiastic regarding it. Whilst Sikhism did not support idolatry, figures of the Sikh gurus were still depicted as figuratives within mural art by the Sikhs. Important Sikh shrines which were decorated with fine examples of Sikh mural artwork (besides the Golden Temple) include Gurdwara Pothimala (located in Guru Harsahai, Firozpur), the Akal Takht (Amritsar, painted in the 19th century), Gurdwara Baba Atal (Amritsar), Gurdwara Lohgarh Sahib (Faridkot), and Gurdwara Baba Veer Singh (Amritsar). Another Amritsari location that was decorated with murals was the Akhara Bala Nand building, which is associated with the Udasi sect of Sikhism. When a juncture occurred, the murals were distributed into various panels, a similarity shared with Chamba murals. The mural panel would represent differing themes from one another.

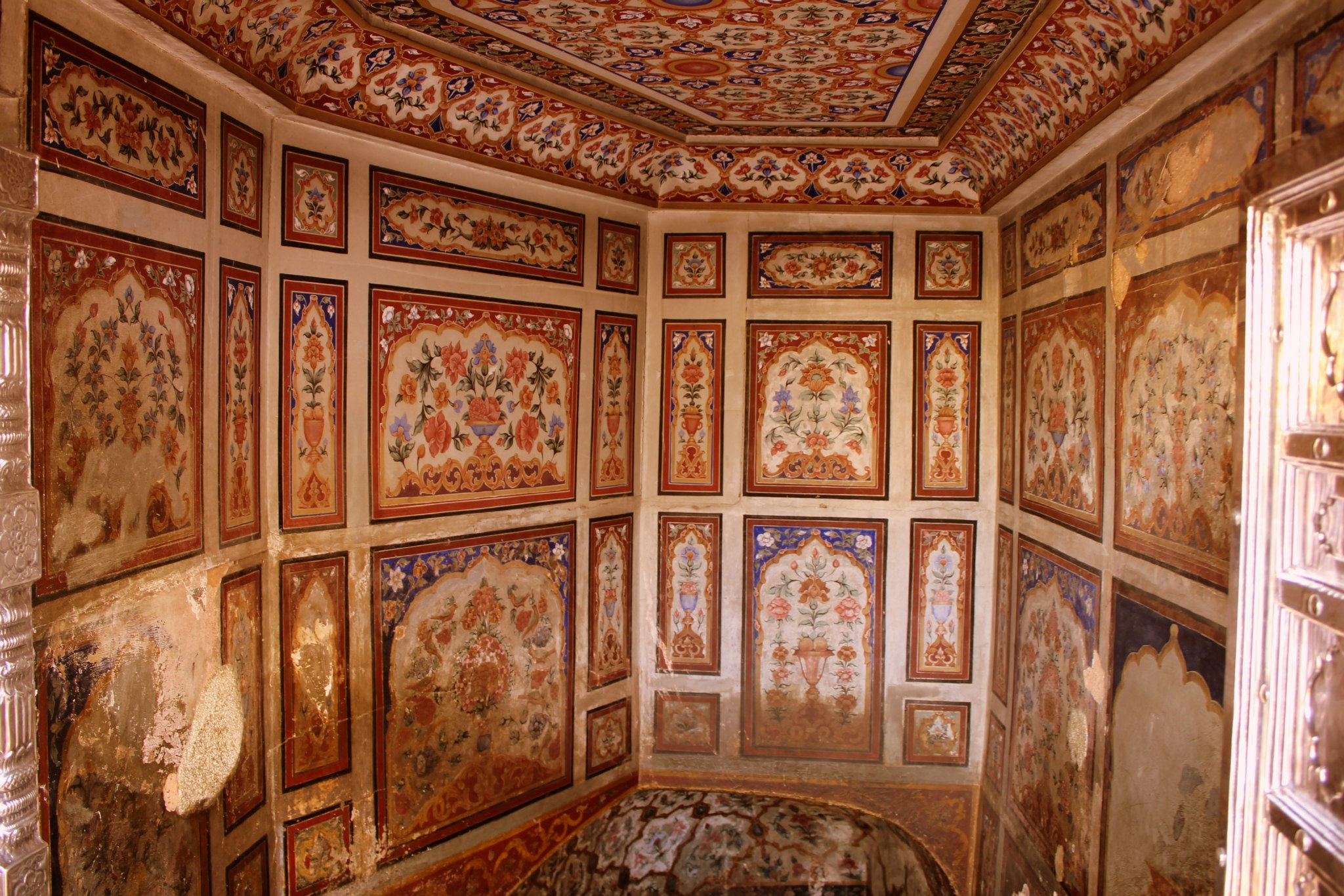
Frescoes within the Golden Temple in Amritsar

When Ranjit Singh died in 1839, the artists who worked under the beautification project of the Golden Temple complex were locally sourced instead. Most of the artisans and naqqashi artists who worked on the Golden Temple are unknown but one specimen of an undersigned name exists on a naqqash dating to circa 1960, revealing the work was done by a certain Atma Singh Naqqash. Hari Singh, himself an artist, prepared a list as per his knowledge of the artists who had once worked painting the interiors and exteriors of the Golden Temple complex, the list of twenty names includes Baba Kishan Singh, Baba Bishan Singh, Kapur Singh, Bhai Kehar Singh, Mahant Ishar Singh, Bhai Sardul Singh, Bhai Jawahar Singh, Bhai Metab Singh, Mistri Jaimal Singh, Bhai Harnam Singh, Bhai Ishar Singh, Bhai Gian Singh, Lal Singh Tarn Taran, Bhai Mangal Singh, Mistri Narain Singh, Mistri Jit Singh, Bhai Atma Singh, Baba Darja Mal, and Bhai Vir Singh. However, the frescoes now seen to the naked eye within the Golden Temple are no longer the originals, as they have since been overpainted. The frescoes of the Golden Temple have been re-painted and restored several times throughout the years. Sometimes, white backgrounds of the original frescoes were completely repainted to cover the dirtying white background. Floral and avian motifs were completely painted over if the paint began flaking-off. Prior retouchings of the frescoes located in the Parikrama zone of the Golden Temple involved watercolours but the frescoes located on the ceilings and arches of the shrine had been carried out with a thick coat of some kind of synthetic medium. Up til 2013, the authorities overseeing the Golden Temple were ignorant about treating the frescoes, restoring them to their original state, nor preserving them but instead opted to repaintings and overpaintings for the most part. The last artist to conduct overpainting work on the murals at the shrine was Bhai Atma Singh. When paint was flaking-off at multiple times in history, the affected area was repainted by various artists. Most of the wall paintings at the Golden Temple now have protective glass covering them.

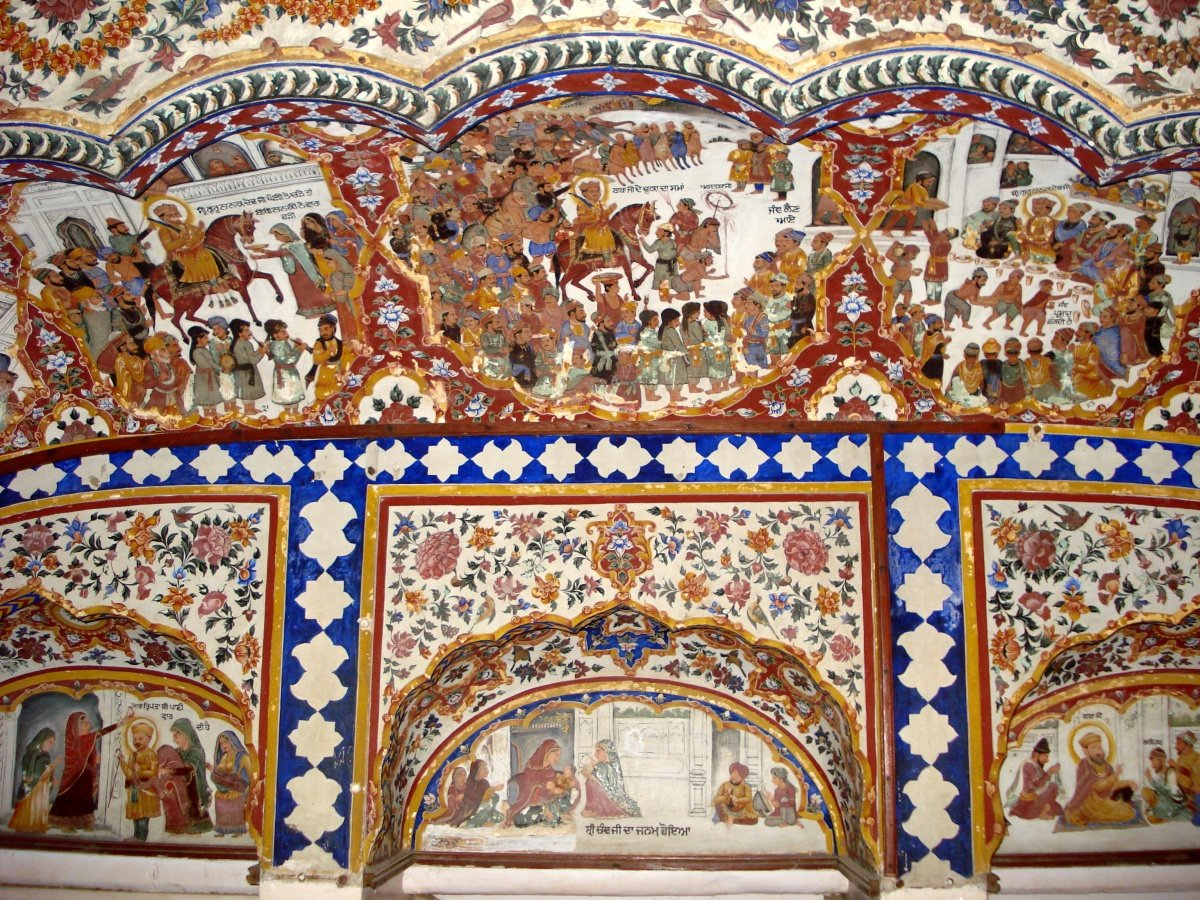
Frescoes of Gurdwara Baba Atal

Located nearby to the Golden Temple in Amritsar is another Sikh shrine, a towering, eight-storied, octagonal-shaped complex known as Gurdwara Baba Atal. On the second floor of this building the walls are elaborately and profusely embellished with wall paintings depicting episodes relayed throughout the Janamsakhi literature, relating to the life of Guru Nanak. Events from the birth of Nanak to the successorship of Angad are displayed. Gurdwara Baba Atal's murals originally date to the 19th century and were painted in a bold form.

During the height of the Amritsari mural art tradition, there existed a street in the city known as Gali Naquas, where Sikh naqqash artists specializing in mohrakashi lived. Some prominent Sikh muralists who lived on the street were Puran Singh Mussavar and Amir Singh. Another Amritsari muralist, Hari Singh, had also done artwork in the city but his work had been destroyed in the partition of 1947. The Sikh princely states of Patiala, Nabha, Jind, Faridkot, and Kapurthala also patronized muralists and featured extensive mural artwork in their capitals.

In a report from 1881, Henry Hardy Cole notes the murals of the Golden Temple complex and that they were being restored by the Sikh temple management of Amritsar via expert, native artisans. The Sikh and Punjabi mural art tradition survived into the British rule, continuing into the late 19th century and beyond. Whilst the art of murals fell into decline thus after, it has recently been revived by newer artists, such as Gurpreet Singh Mankoo. In 1985, Kanwarjit Singh Kang identified 175 sites in then Punjab that had extant mural artwork dating to the 19th century.

=== Process of creating a mural ===
The process of producing a wall painting as per the traditional Sikh school is as follows:

- design or patterns on paper are first etched, which are then transferred to the wall in-question
- scale and proportion of the planned artwork must be harmonious with the wall's physical dimensions
- a khakaa (stencil or perforated tracing) is prepared based upon the pattern of the planned artwork. The outline of the motif is pricked with a needle to create it. Khakaas must be made using thick paper as soft-surfaced paper will not suffice in the case of prolonged use as a stencil.
- outline of the wall is performed by using charcoal dust with the stencil. The coal dust is safeguarded and transported within potli (small cloth bundles).
- a method termed pora is done to cure the wall in-preparation for future plastering. Plaster is only applied to sections of the wall that is to be painted on and the wall must be wet to achieve the desired effects. Improper curing of the wall, specifically the brick walls, will lead to bulges forming after the plaster dries, ruining the artwork. Thus, time is of the essence and artists do not have time on their side as they must carry out the work in a fast enough manner so the colours will hold onto the wall.
- a white khakaa stencil is placed upon the section of the plastered wall and the coal powder is spread on the stenciled wall, creating a pattern for the muralist to work upon
- colours are implanted within the lime-based plaster using a nehla (small wooden-handled trowel) but the plaster must remain wet to successfully do so

At the Golden Temple, the walls which contain frescoes are made of bricks which were baked until they turned red in-colour, which had been placed with sand-lime mortar. Lime was the fundamental component needed for the preparation of the surface of the brick walls for fresco painting. The lime was applied on wettened walls. The plaster was composed of slaked lime and sand was pressed into the joints of the wall and forged all throughout with a long-strip of wood (garmala) edgeways till it is slightly desiccated and plain. Once it reached that state, the next stage involved working in intonaco, which is a finely grained plaster layer which covers a rougher layer called the arriccio. Finally, as the plaster somewhat dried and became adherent, it was polished with an agate polishing stone until the surface was cast with the artwork.

=== Colours for murals ===
Many colours were used in murals (with various methods of naturally creating each pigment), some of which are as follows:

- Desi Hiramchi (red oxide, oxide of iron)
- Gulzard
- Narelh/thutheya (coconut shell) ink
- Sang sabj (green stone)
- Zardi/gacchi/gacchni (multani mitti, also known as Fuller's earth)
- Lajward (lapis lazuli)
- Doga (white marble)

=== Tools and materials for mural work ===
Various tools are required for painting frescoes, such as Karandi (bricklayer's trowel or plastering trowel), Tasla (iron tasla), Tesi (belt axe), Chhanna (window mesh sieve), two variants of hand floats known locally as Gurmala (steel [flat or finishing trowel] and wood [wooden fresco hand float]), Patti (scraper), and Spray (watering spray gun).

Some materials needed to be purchased or prepared for painting murals are Keri (red brick dust), Rayh-taah (grey sand), Bhejya Chunna (slaked lime), lime putty (such as CTS Company's chunna), and Chhappai da kagaz (tracing paper).

== Metal ==
=== Damascening ===
Many weapons and armour produced during Sikh-rule feature koftgari embellishment design. This damascening technique consists of gold or silver being inlaid or encrusted on blued metal, usually steel or iron. Common themes include calligraphy or florals. Different sub-types include the teh-i-nishan (true inlay), talakub (shallow inlay), and dewali (gilting or overlay).

=== Embossed metalworking and reliefs ===
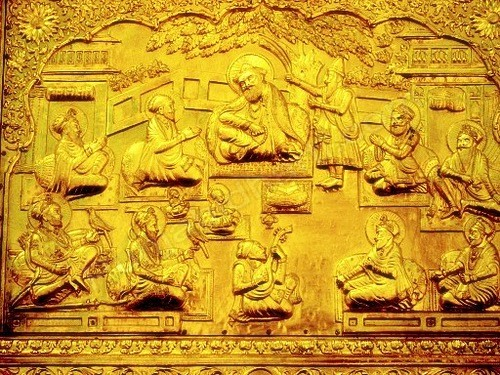
Repoussé plaque (gilded panel) depicting the ten Sikh gurus engraved in gold at Gurdwara Tarn Taran Sahib, Punjab

Gilded panels were used to decorate the Darbar Sahib edifice in Amritsar by Ranjit Singh. A form of bas-relief work, known as repoussé plaques, using metal like brass and copper panels, were a popular form of art in the 19th and early 20th century. These panels were often gilded (covered in a layer of gold). This form of art-craft is known in Punjabi as ubhar-da-kam (meaning "raised work"; from ubhar i.e. swelling or raising). Many surviving panels depicting Sikh religious figures and sakhis remain extant and are enshrined on Sikh religious edifices, such as the Golden Temple and nearby Gurdwara Baba Atal Rai. The panels often also depict floral motifs and designs. Most of the surviving panel works in the Golden Temple are floral whilst Gurdwara Baba Atal Rai contains many figurative works. Embellishments were wrought into the copper or brass panels by Thathera artisans, craftsmen, or guilds, the most renowned of which were located in Kucha Fakirkhana in Lahore. Usage of brass for artistic crafts were most popular in Rewari, Jagadhri, Amritsar, Jandiala, Phagwara, Gujranwala, Pindi Dadan Khan and Kangra in the late 19th century. The panels were often patronized by a devotee in the form of a donation. Most of the patrons and craftsmen worked and donated anonymously, however the panels at Gurdwara Baba Atal Rai contain Gurmukhi inscriptions identifying patrons, the crafting worker or guild, and date of execution of the work, a rare occurrence. This style of art declined once devotees started displaying their donations in the form of marble slabs being affixed to edifices instead of elaborate, expensive, and decorated gilded panels in the 20th century. As such, this form of art is nearly extinct at present. A few expert craftsmen from as little as three or four families, from the Thathera community, remain in Amritsar who have passed down the know-how on how to execute this art form of metal reliefs, though younger generations are not interested in learning the trade.

== Inlaid ==
=== Stone ===
During the reign of Ranjit Singh, gold, silver, and precious stones were used to decorate weapons, howdahs, equestrian saddles, beds, furniture, utensils and also as jewellery.

==== Jaratkari ====
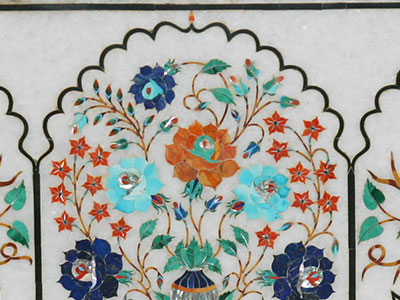
Inlaid stone art (jaratkari) from the walls of the Golden Temple shrine in Amritsar depicting floral motif designs

The art method of jaratkari (also known as munavat), comparable to pietra dura (inlaid stone design), uses various coloured stones engraved and inlaid into marble, is a common expression of art at Sikh shrines, such as at the Golden Temple. The stones were mostly sourced from Rajasthan and were of the Neelam, Nag, Surkha, Lajwart, and Kattu varieties. Other kinds of stones of varying colours were also used, such as jaratkari, haqiaue (red and pink), zeharmora (green), khattu pathat (yellow), sabaz pathar (dark green), sabaz pathar nargiz (green), sang yaashap (green, light green, white, and blue), Arabic smak (light black) and sang pasham (light green). The process for creating inlaid stone artwork first involves a drawing sketch of the hypothesized work. This conception is then transferred onto a marble slab. The original conceptual sketch alongside any planned colouring schemes is provided by the Naqqash (artist) to the stone-dresser so that cutting of varying coloured stones can occur. The required stone patterns are then emplaced on the marble slab by a pather-ghara. The process required carefully emplacing delicate pieces of stone into the marble panel. Jaratkari was an art form and method which involved placing inlaid and cut stones of varying colours and types into marble. Surviving exemplars of jaratkari art from the Golden Temple can be found on the bottom section of the exterior walls which are encased with marble panels featuring jaratkari artwork. The jaratkari marble panels in this lower exterior section is classified as pietra dura and semi-precious stones, like lapis lazuli and onyx, were utilized. Whilst the Mughals also decorated their edifices using jaratkari and pietra dura art, what sets apart the Sikh form of the art technique from the Mughal one is that the Sikh jaratkari art form also depicts human and animal figuratives with it, something that is not found in Mughal jaratkari art.

==== Gach and tukri ====
Gach can be described as a kind of stone or gypsum. Gach was transformed into a paste and used on the walls, similar in nature to lime-plaster. Once applied to the wall, it was decorated into shape with steel cutters and other tools. Sometimes the gach had coloured glass pieces placed on it, which is known as tukri. The Shish Mahal room of the Golden Temple features many examples of tukri work.

=== Ivory ===
Inlaid ivory work can be witnessed on the doors of the Darshani Deori structure of the complex. The structure of the Darshani Deori was made of shisham wood, the front of the edifice is overlaid with silverwork, including ornamated silver panels. The back of the structure is decorated with panels consisting of floral and geometric designs but also animal figuratives, such as deer, tigers, lions, and birds. Portions of the inlaid ivory had been coloured red or green, an aspect of the artwork that was praised by H.H. Cole for its harmoniousness.

== Wood carving ==
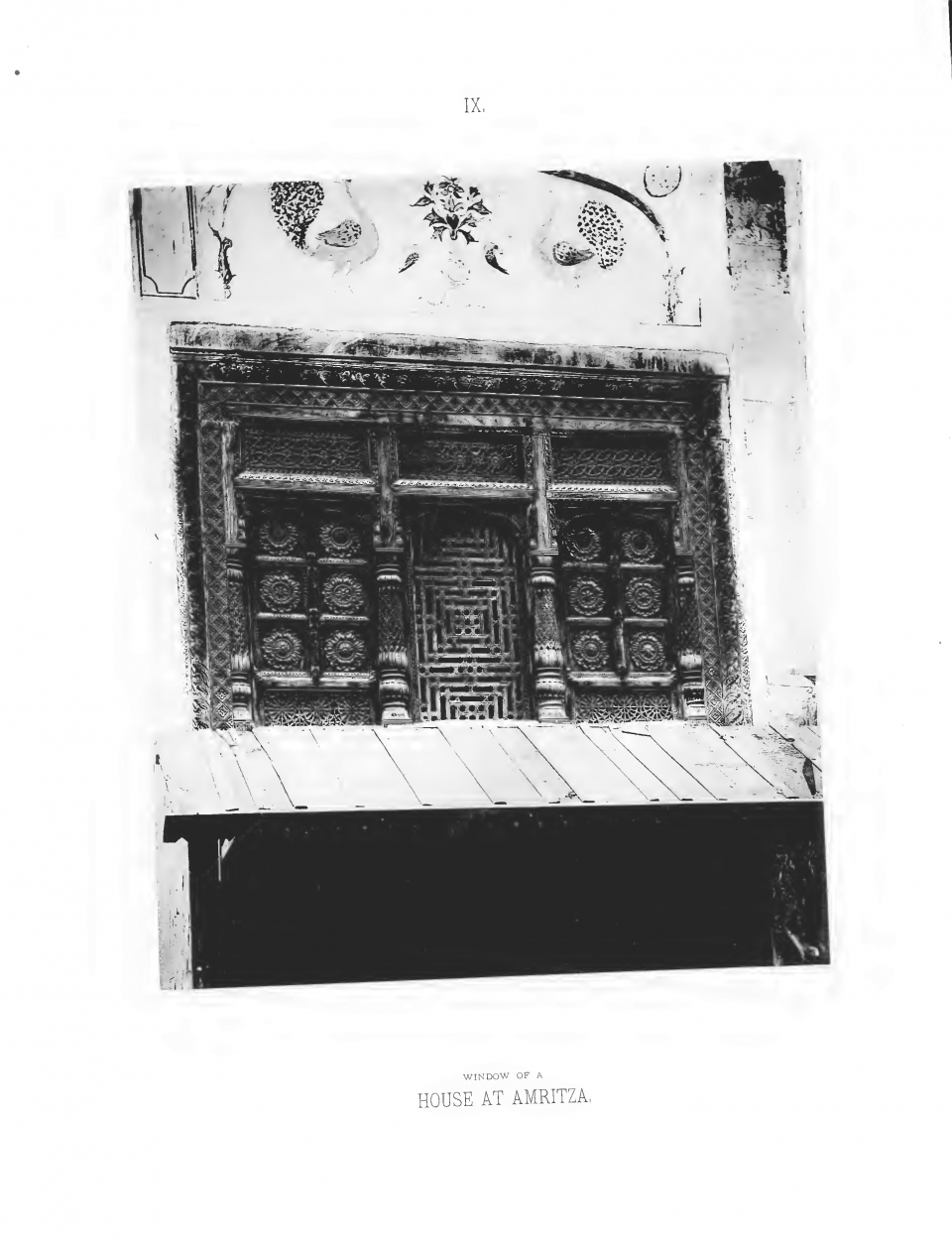
Photograph plate titled 'PLATE IX. WINDOW OF A HOUSE AT AMRITZA.' [Amritsar], published in 'Indian Domestic Architecture' (1885) by Lockwood de Forest.

Wood-carving artwork was mostly associated with doors and window-frames, it was usually highly ornamented. Some wood-carvings were figurative, such as depicting Nihangs. These wood carvings were commonly found near the entrance facade of shrines. It could also be found in the front of the balconies of residential dwellings. Some major centres of wood carving were Chiniot, Bhera, and Rohtak. Talented wood carvers could also be found at Lahore, Amritsar, Hoshiarpur, Batala, Zira, Samana, Sunam, and Hissar. The Sikh art of wood carving mostly died out during the colonial era. As per Kang (1981), it died out due to the establishment of the Mayo School of Art in Lahore. Most specimens of this style have disappeared due to neglect or decay except for hardy surviving specimens made out deodar tree wood.

== Embroidery ==
Detail of a textile depicting Guru Nanak and his companions, Sikh, circa first half of 20th century

During the reign of Ranjit Singh, gold thread were woven in fabrics and hand-woven woollens consisted of pashmina and tūs were used for clothing, tents, and canopies (raised on silver and golden poles). Sikh emroidery often depicts Guru Nanak with his companions, Bhai Bala and Bhai Mardana. Some surviving examples are Chinese.

== Photography ==
=== Foreign ===
Before the arrival of photography, European artists in Punjab would bring and use a camera obscura to assist them in their work. In Punjab, the first photographs were taken by colonial officials employed in the military and civil services, with foreign travellers also taking photos of Sikhs from a perspective influenced by colonialism, such as by depicting the Sikhs as a "martial race". Eventually, the art of photography was adopted and sponsored by the native royal elites and spread to the native population. According to Thacker's Indian Directory (1863–1920), there were photographic studios and dealers of photographic material in the following cities in colonial Punjab: Lahore, Shimla, Amritsar, Murree, Peshawar, Rawalpindi, Jalandhar, Ambala, Sialkot, Ferozpur, and Hoshiarpur.

Whilst the early history of the art of photography in the Punjab is shrouded in mystery, the first photographs taken of Sikhs of whom the identity of the lensman is known were snapped by John McCosh, a British military surgeon employed by the East India Company who had been stationed at Firozpur. He snapped photographs during the Second Anglo-Sikh War between 1848 and 1849, some of the earliest known examples of war photography in history. Using calotype technology, he captured images of individual Sikh persons and notable locations within Lahore. In 1848, McCosh snapped a portrait photograph of the then reigning 10-year-old child monarch, Maharaja Duleep Singh of the Sikh Empire, seated on a chair in a profile pose. McCosh also took images of Diwan Mulraj, a few Sikh chieftains, granthis, and the samadhi of Maharaja Ranjit Singh (which had been erroneously captioned as a tomb). In November 1849, John McCosh requested permission from John Login to capture daguerreotype photographs of "all the notabilities" of the Sikh Empire, including Mul Raj who was then held at the Lahore Fort, Login politely declined and replied that McCosh did not have permission to capture photographs of the prisoners at Lahore Fort.

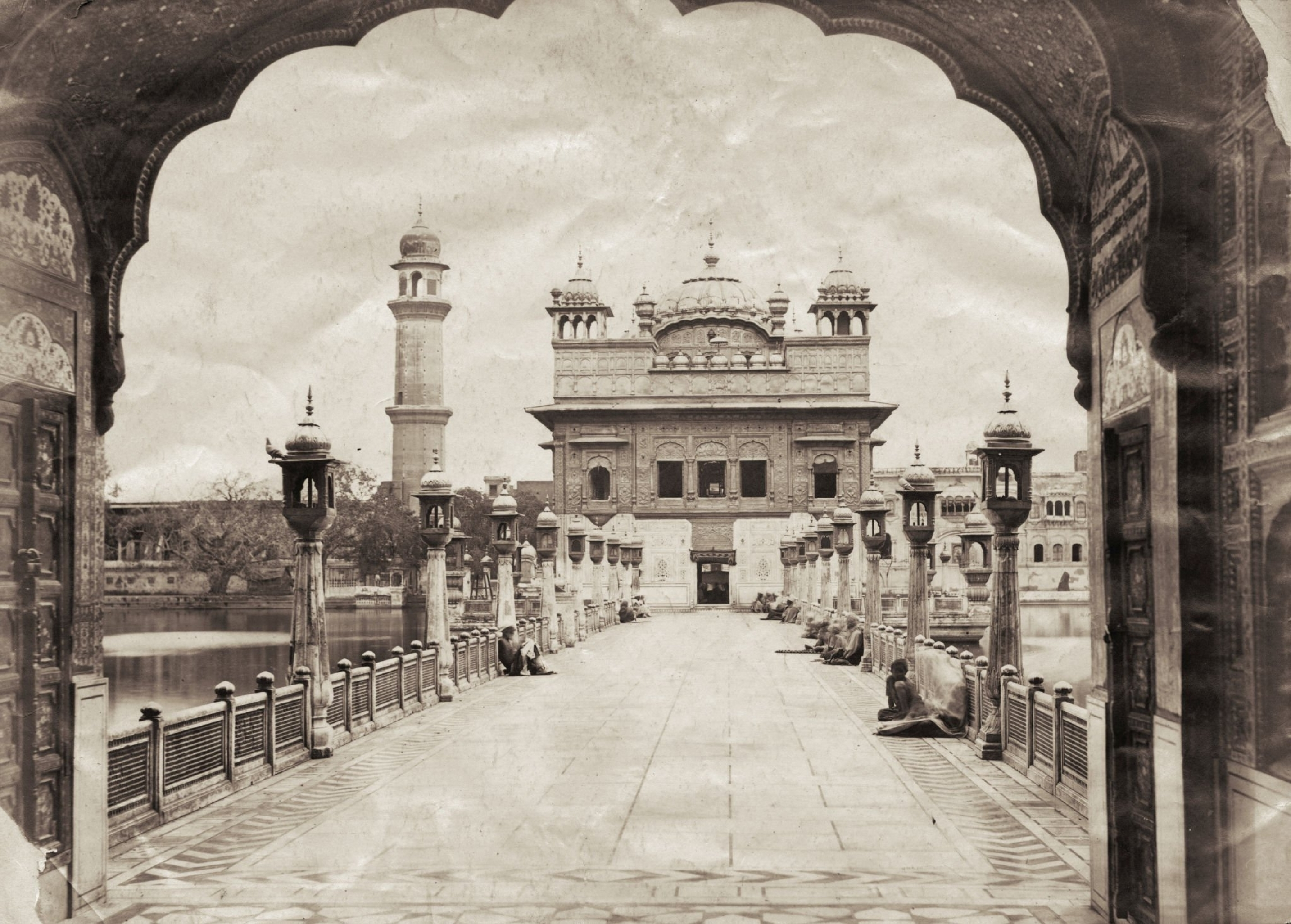
Photograph of the walkway leading to the Golden Temple (Harmandir Sahib) in Amritsar, India, circa 1880

One of the earliest photographers of the Golden Temple in Amritsar was a man by the name of Charles Waterloo Hutchinson, he clicked a photo of the site in 1856, seven years after the fall of the Sikh kingdom. However, none of Hutchinson's works are known to have survived till the present-day. Prominent photographers and studios who captured Golden Temple and other Sikh sites in the 19th and early 20th centuries with their lens' were Samuel Bourne (1863–65), John Edward Saché (1860s), William Baker (1864–66), James Craddock (1868–70), W. G. Stretton (1870), Baker & Burke (1872), Bourne & Shepherd (1880s–90s), A. Skeen (1900), Hannah P. Adams (1906), Herbert G. Ponting (1906), Underwood & Underwood (1908), Stereo Travel Co. (1908), and H. Templar (1910).

Ethnographic photographs of a Lahori Sikh man were taken by the German ethnologist Andreas Fedor Jagor in the late 1850s. Another early pioneer of photographing Sikhs was the Italian-British Felice Beato, whom had been traversing the northern regions of the Indian subcontinent in the aftermath of the Indian Mutiny of 1857. Some specimens he portrayed in his photographic works include Akali-Nihangs, Sikh soldiers employed in the colonial military (such as in Hodson's Horse), and various views of the Golden Temple shrine and complex of Amritsar. In the 1860s, Colonel Willoughby Wallace Hooper and George Western together took several photographs of Nihangs that may have served in the irregular forces of the Nizam of Hyderabad. The Nihangs were popular targets for anthropometric photographs in the 19th century. In 1868, the Inspector General of Police in Punjab, George Hutchinson, introduced photography in jails in the region as a way to register criminals. In 1861, the Punjab government sent out directives to the commissioners of the divisions to submit photographs of "remarkable tribes" with "photographic likeness", thus many amateur photographers went out to snap photos in an effort to submit them for the project. However, the residents of Amritsar did not get photographed due to difficulties and there already being photographs of Lahoris, with Amritsaris being deemed as similar enough to the Lahoris to not warrant their own photos. As a result, for The People of India project, the following photographs of Sikhs, were published between 1868 and 1875:

- Nanukshahee Fakir, Bareilly, no. 123, vol. 3
- Oodassees, Delhi, no. 196, vol. 4
- Sodhee Sikh, Trans-Sutlej states, no. 219, vol. 4
- Akalee, Lahore, no. 225, vol. 4
- Sikh jat, Lahore, no. 233, vol. 5
- Muzbee Sikhs, Lahore, no. 237, vol. 5
- Sodhee, Lahore, no. 240, vol. 5
- Sikh Akali, Sindh, no. 324, vol. 6

As the 19th century progressed, the Sikhs were viewed as a martial-race, and the British Indian Army underwent Punjabization. As part of this process, Sikhs in the British Indian military were photographed to represent an image of "ideal masculine warriors" for the British Empire. During World War I, the colonial administration used photography as a means of propaganda amongst the Sikhs, such as by producing photographs of Sikh soldiers carrying the Guru Granth Sahib on the backdrop of the conflict and other staged scenes. However, many authentic photos of Sikh serving in the war were taken by amateur photographist soldiers who snuck in pocket cameras. After the events of Jallianwala Bagh in 1919 and Guru Ka Bagh in 1922, photography became a medium to challenge the British authority in India, with photography by Narayan Vinayak Virkar (in 1919) and Ariel Varges (in 1922) disproving official accounts of certain events, fueling the Indian nationalist movement. Later, after the trial and execution of Bhagat Singh, photographs of him were widely spread and attained a cult-like status amongst the populace, being shared more than images of Mahatma Gandhi were.

=== Native ===
There are examples of early adoption of photography by Sikhs, with surviving images of families, gurdwaras, religious leaders, ceremonies, associations, and other captures. These photographs were usually meant to capture specific moments in-times in a casual manner rather than being artistic or commercial items. The Sikh princely-states combined the arts of photography with traditional miniature painting to increase their local appeal. These photographs would influence portraiture artwork, such as in Patiala.

Native interest in the art of photography can be traced early-on. In 1853, Maharaja Narinder Singh of Patiala obtained a daguerreotype and tried to have one of his artists trained in its use. Maharaja Duleep Singh took an interest in photography since his exile from Punjab to England in 1854, often taking photographs of friends, family, and acquaintances at various events and locations over the years. Duleep and his family would pose for photographs from famous European photographers, such as Antoine Claudet, John Mayall, and John W. Clarke. Another early example is the Raja of Chamba in the Punjab Hills in the 1860s. According to Samuel Borne in 1866, the Raja of Chamba had procured a camera and other photographic equipment, which they called masalas (spices). Traditional miniature portraiture had long been present in Punjab and realistic portraiture increased in popularity with Sikh artists in the early 19th century, thus photography was adopted by the Sikhs for portrait making of dignatories, which was used with painting to beautify the photos. With the introduction of albumen print in the 1850s and the ability to produce paper copies from glass negatives, it became a custom for royals to have photographs taken when they visited places that had photographic studios. Thus, portraits taken during these visits would be posted on hardboard in the form of larger cabinet cards or smaller visiting cards, known as carte de visites. By the 1860s, these cards started being published and included in albums by Bourne & Shepherd in Shimla and Baker & Company in Peshawar, Murree, and Rawalpindi. In the 1870s, the Sikh rulers of the states of Faridkot, Nabha, and Patiala, were posing for Bourne & Shepherd photographs while wearing courtly clothing.

The Sikh royals' patronage of miniature painting continued in an altered form after the introduction of photography, as now the sitter for a painting could just have their photo taken and the artist creating a painting based on that photo, rather than an actual sitter. Thus, many paintings of Sikh royals in the late 19th century, such as from the states of Patiala, Nabha, and Kapurthala, were created in this manner of being originally based on photos of the depicted person. Another new custom that arose was the painting of photographs. Initially, this consisted of tinting and painting daguerrotypes to improve their visual quality but later-on it was done for aesthetic purposes. Sometimes, photographs were so heavily painted that they essentially became paintings, such as the 1892 photograph of Balbir Singh of Faridkot by John Blees that was deeply embellished via watercolour to such a degree that the image's "photographic dimension and depth became flat". With this relationship between photography and painting amongst the Sikhs, many of the early Sikh pioneers in photography were from artistic-backgrounds, such as Kapur Singh of Kapurthala, who was one of the first painters in the region to learn photography. One of the largest patrons of photography was Nabha State, who patronized artists/photographers for photographs, painted-photos, and paintings based on photographs. Nabha State took an early-interest in the emerging technology of photography and Lal Singh Musawir, originally trained as a miniaturist for the state, delved into photography. With this increased demand, many photographic studios based in Bombay, Calcutta, Shimla, and Lahore contended with each other for commissions by asserting themselves as being "photographic artists" that provided those services.

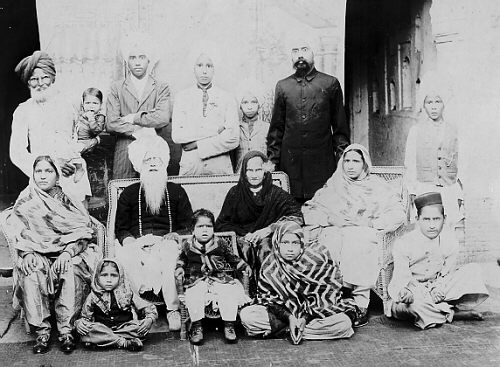
Photograph of a Sikh patriarch and his family, Punjab, ca.1890's

From the 1870s onwards to the close of the 19th century, photography in Punjab ceased to be relegated only to the royals, with other classes and sections of the society, such as members of the royal court, Sikh scholars, religious specialists, and other important figures, beginning to engage in photography, often via colonial and aristocratic patronage. In the 1880s, Umrao Singh Sher-Gil of the Majithia family took-up photography and developed his own style of portraiture. Until the 1880s, photography in India utilized the collodian wet plate process required long exposure times and immediate processing of the photographic material, requiring the usage of chemicals, developing tents, and glass plates, thus there was not much mass adoption of photography amongst the Punjabi masses due to it being an laborious process. With the introduction of the Kodak system in the late 1880s, it made photography much easier via photographic film, portable cameras, and machine-coated papers, thus allowing the technology to spread amongst the population more readily, creating a new group of amateur photographers. In the 1891 census, 2,024 persons in Punjab recorded themselves as being painters or photographers, with around 45% of them being females. From the 1890s onwards, photo-postcards were mass-produced, boosting portraiture.

Dhanna Singh was an amateur Sikh photographer who would take pictures of various Sikh landmarks whilst touring various religious places on his bicycle, referring to himself as a "cycle yatru" ("cycle pilgrim"). Dhanna Singh was employed as a driver of Maharaja Bhupinder Singh of Patiala and set-about on his photographic, cycling tours, with his first-tour taking place in the 1920s and his last tour in the 1930s, with him travelling 25,000 miles on his bicycle and taking hundreds of photographs of historical gurdwaras and other locations in the process. His photographs were rediscovered and popularized by the Panjab Digital Library.

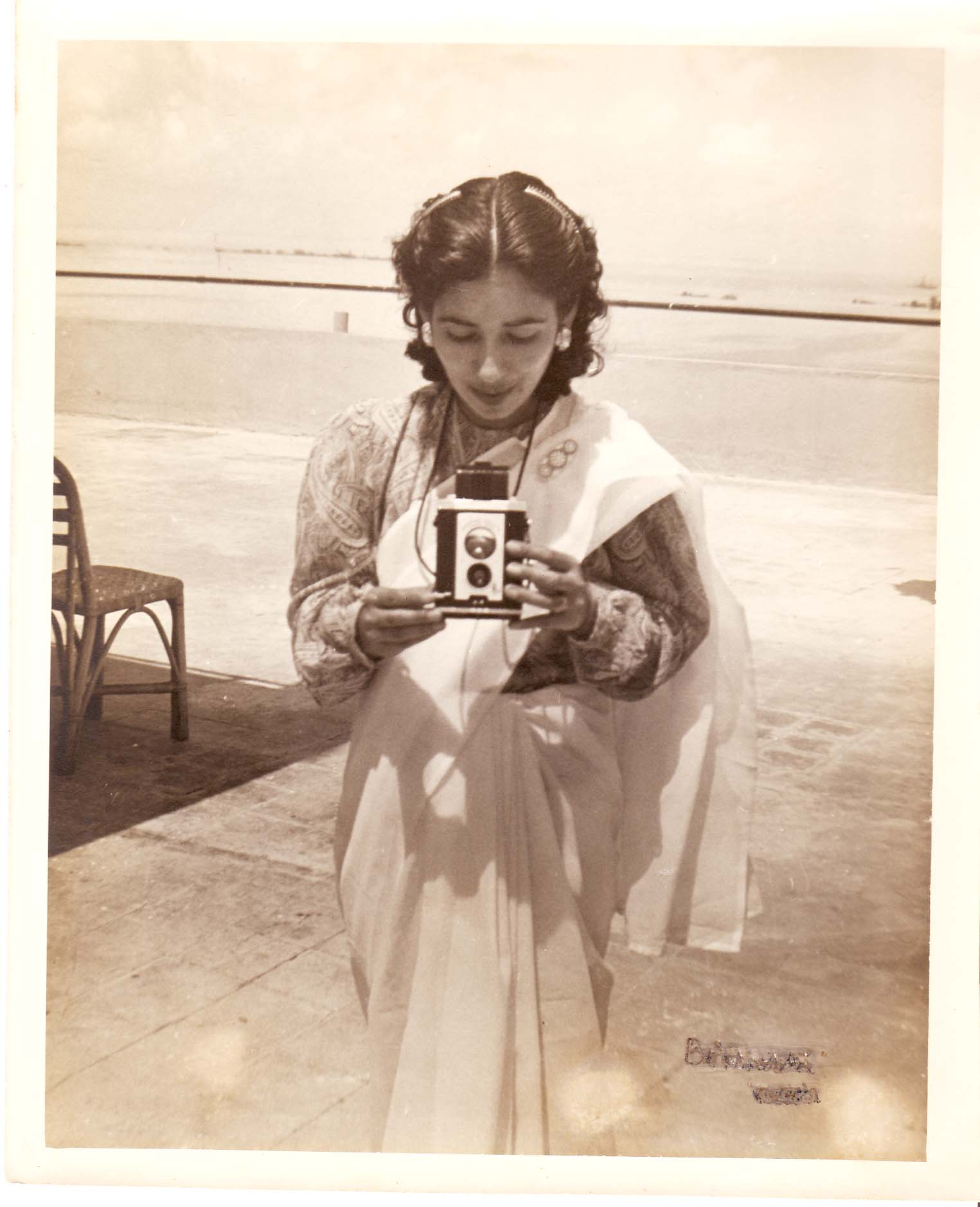
Selfie photograph taken by Sushil Kaur, Manila, the Philippines, 1946. From the Amarjit Singh Chandan Collection.

A practice of photographing the corpses of Sikh martyrs, fighters, and leaders developed amongst the Sikhs, which is known as muh dekhna (also known as antim darshan or aakhri deedar), with viewing such images being equivalent to a darshan of shahadat (death by martyrdom). Corpses tended to be displayed in the shava asana or padmasan poses. The practice was prominent during the turbulent periods of 20th century Sikh history and had the purpose of conveying symbolistic undertones and messages, such as evidence of the perceived oppression of Sikhs. The Central Sikh Museum in Amritsar hosts many photographs of Sikhs who were killed during Operation Blue Star in 1984, displaying both photos of them alive and after death to show the contrast between the two states of being. The museum also hosts paintings of Sikh figures that are heavily influenced by the 19th century practice of realistic portraiture based upon photography. Furthermore, photographs of the Akal Takht when it was damaged in Blue Star and after it was reconstructed are displayed together to show the rejuvenation of Sikh power. Included at the Central Sikh Museum and Sikh Reference Library are portraits of prominent Sikh militants, such as Shabeg Singh and Jarnail Singh Bhindranwale, both when they were alive and of their corpse.

In the modern-age, photographs of Sikh religious leaders, ancestors, and martyrs decorate the walls of many Sikh homes, shops, and institutions.

== Videography and cinema ==
Film footage of the Golden Temple in Amritsar, by Roger Dumas, circa November–December 1927

Between 1927 and 1928, Roger Dumas (1891–1972) of The Archives of the Planet project took films in Punjab, including of Amritsar (including of the Golden Temple), Kapurthala, Patiala, and Rampur.

Sikhlens is an international Sikh film organisation founded by Bicky Singh in 2000 that hosts film festivals dedicated to Sikh cinema in countries such as Canada, the United States, the United Kingdom, and India, with over 600 films being produced. A Sikh individual active in producing Sikh films in America is Rajwant Singh. The Sikh Art & Culture Society, New York founded by Teji Bindra hosts an annual exhibition of short-documentaries on Sikh topics. There is also the Sikh Art & Film Foundation (est. 2001) which holds an annual Annual Sikh Heritage Awards Gala and Annual Sikh Film Festival.

== Conservation ==
Sam Dalrymple periodises the destruction and loss of Sikh murals and architecture to three distinct phases (which has caused more historic and authentic Sikh heritage now being located in Pakistan rather than India):

1. In the 1920s in the backdrop of the Singh Sabha and Gurdwara Reform movements, when hereditary caretakers were removed from controlling Sikh sites and the orthodox reformers subsequently erasing any heterodoxical elements from the sites now under their purview.
2. After partition in 1947, with the local Sikh populations of the land that became Pakistan becoming refugees in India, with the sites remaining in Pakistan becoming decrepit with no caretakers. Furthermore, sites in India now had to cater to a larger congregation, resulting in renovations to expand and rebuild the sites in the 1950s–60s, resulting in the loss of heritage structures and murals in the process. Formerly unique-looking sites with unique styles (such as the Patiala/Phulkian style found in Malwa, which consisted of sites with Rajasthani style domes, shikaras, and a synthesis of a Sufi shrine and fort) were replaced with a standardized appearance, featuring modern marble and onion domes
3. During the turmoil of the 1980s, including Operation Blue Star, many heritage sites were demolished and then rebuilt, especially in Amritsar (such as the Akal Takht and Sikh Reference Library). It was through the numerous reconstructions of the Akal Takht (first by the government and then again by the Sikhs) that local Sikh leaders realized the money to be made in reconstructing heritage sites, which increased the rate of heritage sites being renovated, rebuilt, and standardized, with the loss of murals, original features, and unique styles in the following decades (such as at Nanded, Maharashtra in 2007–2008 and Tarn Taran in 2018).

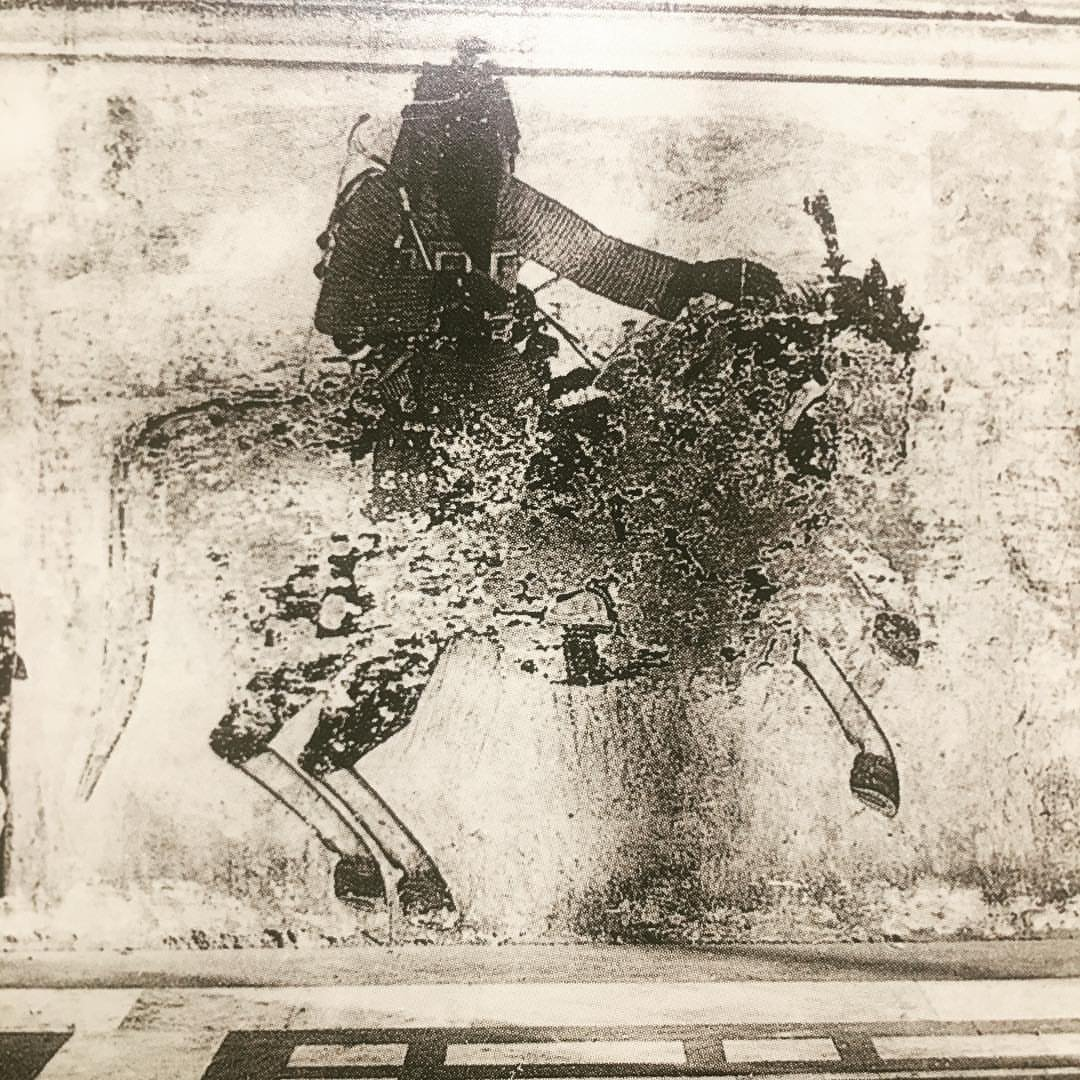
Photograph from 1902 of a mural depicting a Sikh warrior on horseback from the wall of the Harmandir Sahib prakaram. It is no longer extant

Many Sikh heritage sites (including their architecture and artwork) have been destroyed or altered beyond recognition under the guise of "kar seva" renovations by various institutions and groups in recent-times. A large renovation campaign of Sikh gurdwaras began in the 1970s. An example of these haphazard and destructive renovations is an incident involving some of the frescoes at Gurdwara Baba Atal, which were replaced with bathroom tiles and plaster by kar seva groups or were repainted. In 1997, the murals of the central pavilion of the Golden Temple in Amritsar were destroyed in a renovation. At some point, painted walls fell out of fashion in the Punjab, Himachal Pradesh, and Haryana and were thus replaced by whitewashing them to create distempered walls. Many are also defaced by visitors who vandalize them with writing. Many Sikh wall paintings have also been overpainted in recent years, which destroys the original pictorial layers. The remaining murals are decaying at a fast-pace. Many groups are rushing to digitize what remains for posterity before they are lost, such as Panjab Digital Library.

“Gone are the bazaars and the roads that lead to Harmandir Sahib. The old buildings, built in the Sikh architectural style, with frescoes, have been broken down. In their place, are plazas and modern buildings that are made to superficially resemble them. But very few people understand the gravity of loss. These buildings will never compare to the ones that were demolished. The frescoes on them will never be as spellbinding and awe-inspiring as the ones that were painted by the masters of years gone. The style is the same, but the techniques used have changed.”

— Satpal Danish, grandson of Gian Singh Naqqash (last surviving master of traditional Sikh mural painting)

Kanwarjit Singh Kang is a documenter of Sikh art, who has amassed a vast collection of 40,000 photographs of Punjabi wall paintings he has taken throughout his career. He has published many books analyzing the context of various murals he has captured with his camera.

Shahid Shabbir is a Pakistani who has documented countless Sikh heritage sites (most often neglected, dilapidated, or abandoned) located in his country, including their extant artwork and architecture.

Other persons involved in the documentation and conservation of Sikh artwork include Amandeep Singh Madra and Parmjit Singh in the UK, Harbinder Singh of the Maharaja Duleep Singh Trust and Anglo-Sikh Heritage Trail, Gurmit Rai of Cultural Resource Conservation Initiative, Kanwal Parkash Singh, Amrita and Rabindra Kaur Singh, Narinder Singh Kapany, and, Balvinder Singh of GNDU.

== Reception by Sikhs ==
During the Singh Sabha movement, some orthodox elements, such as the Tat Khalsa, questioned portrayals of the Sikh gurus in art, as they argued these images would be susceptible to iconography, with this going against the anti-idolatry stance of mainstream Sikhism. Kahn Singh of Nabha was against portrayals of the Sikh gurus as he felt they were anachronistic and did not align with Sikh theology, stating:

We do not know what any of them [Sikh gurus] looked like, and efforts to represent them in pictorial form must necessarily be products of each artist's preconceptions and imagination. The pictures which do exist [...] are manifestly unhistorical and, typically, they transgress the gurus' teachings. This they do by incorporating foolish anachronisms and by clothing the gurus in a bejewelled finery which they themselves would surely have spurned. An assembly of learned historians and talented artists might jointly devise portraits which accurately communicate the gurus' spiritual qualities. All existing portraits, however, must be rejected.

— Kahn Singh Nabha, Gurumat Martand (1938)

In regards to Kahn Singh Nabha and the general attitude of the Singh Sabha reformers to pictorial representations, W. H. McLeod stated:

The first is the general disfavor with which members of the Singh Sabha movement regarded popular pictorial art, or indeed pictorial art of any kind.... This attitude is well represented by that ornament of the Singh Sabha movement, Khan Singh's magisterial Mahan Kos. Of the encyclopaedia's eighty-one illustrations fifty-eight are photographs and seventeen are maps. Nowhere in the collection are representations of the Gurus to be found. Khan Singh elsewhere explains his unwillingness to sanction pictures of the Gurus. As he rightly claims, there exists no authentic picture of any of the Gurus.

— William Hewat McLeod, Popular Sikh Art (1991), p. 28

When Sobha Singh unveiled his painting of Guru Nanak, Vir Singh said to Sobha Singh, "this is not my Guru Nanak". Harinder Singh questions the authenticity of existing portraits of the Sikh gurus, stating that the gurus did not focus on the image, although images themself are not forbidden. Furthermore, he states that early portraits of the gurus were influenced by the artist's or patron's bias and were influenced by Mughal and Hindu traditions. The dwellings and shrines of Sikhs are often decorated with paintings depicting the Sikh gurus and other figures, however some Sikhs have questioned whether this is an example of idolatry whilst others only are concerned with the action of bowing to a physical painting. There is also the argument that the physical depictions, despite usually being imaginary works of the artist, help a Sikh feel closer to their religion. As per Gurvinderpal Singh, senior painter at the Central Sikh Museum, Sikhs do not worship pictures of their gurus (such as by performing puja) and saints but rather they respect them and feel that they serve as reminders to keep in-line with their religion's tenets and abstain from sinning. Sikhs neither pray to or give offerings toward paintings. Garlands may decorate Sikh pictures of their figures but flowers or prasad are not offered to them. According to Kanika Singh, worship of paintings is discouraged in Sikhism but they remain "consumed as sacred items". The influence of Western culture during the colonial-eriod led to Sikhs adopting the practice of hanging paintings of their spiritual figures in their spaces.

In the modern period, realism remains the most popular form of Sikh art with traditional miniatures mostly being relegated to scholarly appreciation. Many modern Sikh artists advocate for realism as a means to more effectively connect with the viewer and historicize what is being depicted but Kanika Singh notes that realism also limits the interpretations possible for a work due to their fixed narrative and form. Despite Sikhism's objection of idolatry, artwork depicting the Sikh gurus are popular. The most popular gurus for portraiture displayed in Sikh homes, stores, and temples are Guru Nanak and Guru Gobind Singh (often displayed together). As per Ikeda Atsushi, the portraits of the Sikh gurus "evokes ambiguous feelings of devotion and commandment" amongst the Sikh viewer.

In a 28 December 2025 ruling, the Akal Takht banned the usage of artificial intelligence, animation, or cinematic imitation to portray Sikh gurus, their family members, Sikh warriors, martyrs, and sacred Sikh ceremonies.

== Historiography ==
Historically, Sikh art had received limited scholarly attention. Many Indian art historians have a cautious or even a caustic opinion of painting of the Punjab. Ananda Coomaraswamy once claimed that Sikh painting was "decadent" in comparison to Mughal and Rajput painting. However, recently Sikh art is being studied in its own terms with more sophisication, by understanding contexts and frameworks. According to Amélie Couvrat Desvergnes, the lives of the painters who were active in Amritsar and Lahore during the 19th century are shrouded in mystery and unknown due to the lack of records and signed pieces, causing their biographies and productions to not be well-documented.

=== Periodisation ===
W. G. Archer (1966), with a later extension by Atsushi (2024), classified existing literature on Sikh artwork into the chronological eras:

1. Records and accounts by early travellers (1830-–70), such as by Baron Charles Hugel (1845) who noted Sikh wall-paintings at Wazirabad, but also by William Barr, Charles Masson, G. T. Vigne, Honigberger, and Emily Eden (all of whom had varying degrees of negative views on native Sikh art, with the trend of them favouring miniatures over murals)
2. Official surveys, opinions, and reports (1870–1900)
3. First generation of art historians and critics (1900–1965)
4. Second generation of art historians and critics (1966–2022), subdivided into two sub-phases:
  1. 1966–98
  2. 1999–2022, which arose during the Khalsa tercentenary of 1999 and its associated exhibitions and studies during the 2000s.

=== Pioneering works (pre-1950s) ===
Percy Brown in Indian Painting (1920) makes mention of Sikh art but connects it to Pahari Rajput styles, especially of Kangra. He further opines that Sikh painting is a "strange mixture of the East and West". He briefly mentions the work of Kapur Singh.

=== Early monographs and thematic studies (1950s–1970s) ===
In 1956, G. S. Sohan Singh published a work analyzing the artwork of his late father, Gian Singh Naqqash. W. G. Archer in 1966 and F. S. Aijazuddin in 1979 conducted research on Western artwork relating to Sikhs and the intoduction of photography. Archer's 1966 work Paintings of the Sikhs was perhaps the first monograph dedicated to the topic. However, he viewed Sikh artwork as only commencing in the first half of the 19th century during Sikh-rule. In the work, Archer links the development of Sikh painting to the Sikh court's patronage of Pahari artists (such as from Guler and Kangra), chiefly via Desa Singh Majithia as a patron. The work relied heavily on the collection of the Victoria and Albert Museum. Mohinder Singh Randhawa authored an article titled "Paintings of the Sikh Gurus in the Collection of Mahant of Gurudwara Ram Rai, Dehradun" (Roopa-Lekha, Vol. XXXIX, No. 1, 1970) that uncovered what is perhaps the oldest miniature paintings of the Sikh gurus, kept in the collection of the mahant of the Ram Rai Darbar complex in Dehradun. Roopa-Lekha (Vol. 39, No. 1, 1971) contains a number of articles relating to Sikh artwork, including two authored by M. S. Randhawa, titled 'Sikh Painting' (covering paintings from a New Delhi manuscript whose creation he associates with Sahib Singh Bedi) and 'Paintings of the Sikh Gurus' (including works that he dates to c. 1680). Other articles on Janamsakhi art were authored by S. S. Dosanj and Rao Uttam Singh. Also in 1971, Randhawa authored an article titled 'Two Panjabi artists of the 19th century: Kehar Singh and Kapur Singh' in the Chhavi (vol. 1, pp. 13–20) periodical that documented those two Sikh artists' lives and works, primarily by studying the collection of the Chandigarh Museum. B. N. Goswamy's 1975 work Painters at the Sikh Court: A Study Based on Twenty Documents connected the system of patronage for the production of Sikh art via Pahari artists through documents kept by a descending family of artists. The work touches upon the role that the Sandhanwalia family played in patronizing art. K. C. Aryan produced two works on the subject in 1975 and 1977 respectively, namely 100 Years Survey of Punjab Painting (1841–1941) and Punjab Murals. F. S. Aijazuddin's 1977 work Pahari Paintings and Sikh Portraits in the Lahore Museum covers Sikh paintings in the Lahore Museum's collection. Meanwhile, his 1979 work Sikh Portraits by European Artists focuses heavily on a single work, The Court of Lahore (Vienna, c. 1850) by August Schoefft.

=== Expanding frameworks (1980s–1990s) ===
Mulk Raj Anand was the first art historian to apply a systemic approach to understanding 19th century Sikh artwork, as seen in his 1981 anthological collection of works, Maharaja Ranjit Singh as Patron of the Arts. Anand claims that the Sikh court of Lahore attempted to emulate earlier Mughal court culture in regard to art patronage. In the anthology, Kanwarjit Singh Kang wrote his first chapter on wall-paintings and his second one on wood-carving. Goswamy's chapter challenged an earlier view put-forth by Archer that Ranjit Singh was indifferent to art. Aijazuddin's chapter focused on the gifting of paintings between the Sikh rulers and British officials for diplomacy. Man Mohan Singh's first chapter examined the differences between execution of native verses foreign artists in regard to art creation, with foreigners being more realistic depiction while local artists preferred realism and idealism (aside from Jiwan Ram) while his second chapter looked at the activities of European artists in the region, meanwhile his third chapter covered Sikh medals. Lance Dane's chapter covered Sikh coinage.

R. P. Srivastava's 1983 work Punjab Painting was groundbreaking in that it argued that a strong tradition of art had existed in the Punjab Plains region (such as via the Chughtai, Kehar Singh–Kishan Singh, and Purkhu–Nainsukh families) even prior to the introduction of Pahari artists from the Punjab Hills via patronage. Furthermore, rather than sole focus being paid to the Sikh Empire based out of Lahore, attention is paid to other Sikh centres of art-production, namely at Amritsar, Patiala, Nabha, Faridkot, and Kapurthala. The author also divided artwork into four-types: royal/court, religious, secular, and ethnological studies. In 1985, a work by Kang titled Wall Paintings of Punjab and Haryana were an in-depth coverage of murals, introducing the idea that Rajasthani artists from Jaipur were patronized for murals (suggested by Karuna Goswamy). Surjit Hans' 1987 work B-40 Janamsakhi Guru Baba Nanak Paintings was one of the few dedicated to a specific artwork rather than the general subject. Another monograph on the topic was The Sikh Art and Architecture (1987) by Darshan Singh.

William Hewat McLeod's 1991 work Popular Sikh Art is an in-depth study of Sikh artwork from the period of the mid-19th century to c. 1965, analyzing works from the Victoria & Albert Museum and his private collection. McLeod believed that Sikh artwork arose through the Janamsakhi literary genre (which later died after the introduction of the printing-press) and discovered illustrated Janamsakhi manuscripts older than the B-40, namely a Bhai Bala set from 1658 kept by P. N. Kapoor in Delhi and the Bagrian set from 1724 kept in the familial collection of Bhai Arduman Singh in Patiala. As per McLeod, Sikh artwork in its purest form was an extension of Sufi art (with the two differing via content instead of style) and that Pahari influences were a corruption of this original Sikh style. He also analyzes Sikh artwork in the colonial-period and the influence of the Singh Sabha movement (which was unfavourable to pictorial representations) but also the later post-colonial period. In 1998, Paintings in the Punjab Plains: 1849–1949 was authored by Masrat Hasan, covering artwork of the Punjab Plains.

=== Post-1999 resurgence ===
According to Bob van der Linden, a concerted interest in Sikh art amongst scholars worldwide only began after the Khalsa tricentenrary celebration in 1999. Works produced in this period include the exhibition book The Arts of the Sikh Kingdoms (1999) edited by Susan Stronge, documenting paintings, textiles, ceramics, metalwork, books, decorative arts, and photography. Another work was Sikh Art and Literature (1999) edited by Kerry Brown, which published essays by art curators, historians, collectors, and religion and literary scholars. The Arts of the Sikh Kingdoms: The Canadian Collections (2000) by Seema Bharadia covered Sikh artwork held in private and institutional Canadian collections. Professor B. N. Goswamy uncovered the lives and works of the artists Kehar Singh, Kapur Singh, Kishan Singh, and Bishan Singh in his 2000 work Piety and Splendour. The Sikhs: Images of a Heritage (2000) by T. S. Randhawa is a published collection of images related to Sikh artwork from the 18th–20th centuries. New Insights into Sikh Art (2003) edited by Kavita Singh documented new areas of research, with a focus on Patiala. In 2003, B. P. Kamboj authored Early Wall Painting of Garhwal, which covers Sikh murals at the Ramraiyan site of the Ram Rai Darbar complex in Dehradun. The Sikh Heritage: A Search for Totality (2004–2005) edited by Daljeet Kaur, contains research on Sikh painting, illuminated and illustrated manuscripts, phulkaris and shawls, and numismatics. I See No Stranger: Early Sikh Art and Devotion (2006) edited by B. N. Goswamy and Caron Smith uncover the early period of Sikh artwork.

=== 2010s–present ===
Recent works often focus on specific collections, such as the following:

- Sikh Heritage: Ethos & Relics (2012), covering traditional Sikh collections, namely the Sursinghwala, Bhai Rupa, Bagrian, Bilga, Darauli, Patiala, and Nabha collections
- In Pursuit of Empire: Treasures from the Toor Collection of Sikh Art (2018), covering the Toor Collection
- The Sikh Art: From the Kapany Collection (2021), covering the Kapany Collection
- Splendors of Punjab Heritage: Art from the Khanuja Family Collection (2022) and Pashmina Jewels: The Khanuja Family Collection of Kashmir Shawls (2026), both covering the Khanuja Collection

Another theme is the documentation of Sikh artwork (usually murals) remaining in Pakistan, such as in the case of the following works:

- Lost Heritage series (two volumes, entitled Lost Heritage, The Sikh Legacy in Pakistan and The Quest Continues: Lost Heritage, The Sikh Legacy in Pakistan respectively) by Amardeep Singh
- The Sikh Heritage: Beyond Borders (2019) by Dalvir Singh Pannu

The Samadhi of Maharaja Ranjit Singh in Lahore: A Summation of Sikh Architectural and Decorative Practices (2018) by Nadhra Khan covers the murals found at the Samadhi of Maharaja Ranjit Singh in Lahore. Vanished and Vanishing Wall Paintings of Punjab and Haryana (2022) by Kanwarjit Singh Kang is a compendium of images of lost and endangered murals of the region. Janamsakhi: Paintings of Guru Nanak in Early Sikh Art (2023) by Nikky-Guninder Kaur Singh is another analysis of the paintings of the B-40 Janamsakhi, examining the stylistic infusions of Punjabi art, the Chaurapanchasika style, and the folk-art style of the Rajasthani Malwa School. Portraying the Guru: Art, Devotion and Identity in Sikhism (2024) by Atsushi Ikeda is a continuation of the research previously conducted by B. N. Goswamy and W. H. McLeod, focusing on how depictions of the Sikh gurus evolved over the centuries, with prime focus being paid toward Guru Nanak. A few books on Sikh art have been authored by Gurdeep Kaur.

== Museums, exhibitions, and institutional and private collections ==
=== Museums ===
==== Sikh museums ====
Sikh museums are known as an Ajaibghar (meaning "house of wonders"). As per Kanika Singh, no other community in India has a comparable museuming drive as the Sikhs do. She believes that Sikh musealisation developed as an alternative, more authoritative, and globally accepted way to showcase Sikh history as opposed to the highly ritualised and religious traditional manner of sacred relics being displayed in Sikh gurdwaras. Furthermore, Sikh museums developed as a way to legitimise the Sikh historical narrative in independent India in an official manner. Sikh museums are both influenced by and incorporate materiality, visuality, faith, identity, history, and politics. The first modern Sikh museum established in India was the Central Sikh Museum in Amritsar in 1958. A recent Sikh museum founded in 2011 is the Virasat-e-Khalsa. Newer museums incorporate multimedia technology but are ultimately based upon Sikh history paintings. Sikh museums are commissioned by Sikh religious bodies such as the SGPC and DSGMC but also governments. The artwork housed in Sikh museums tends to depict the Sikh gurus, their associates, and specific events from Sikh history. Depictions in museums usually focus on the trauma that the Sikh community has endured in its history (often depicted in gory detail), with the paintings often being ordered chronologically. Aspects of each guru are detailed in the paintings as is the suffering of the Sikhs from Mughals, Afghans, Britishers, and in post-1947 India. The paintings utilise realism, iconography, and colours to craft a specific visual. The artwork commissioned for the museums tends to be republished elsewhere (such as calendar art, illustrated storybooks, academic works, musical and theatrical performances, television programmes and documentaries, films, animations, and on the internet) and become circulated in the Sikh community, forming a key aspect of their identity and popular culture. According to Kanika Singh, these aspects give Sikh museums' narrative an authority in the community that is "difﬁcult to challenge". Murphy (2015) describes the use of past objects at Sikh museums, heritage-trails, and gurdwaras is "Sikh museumising imagination", which Kanika Singh disagrees with, who recognises the distinct purpose that Sikh museums play for the Sikh community that is different from shrines with museums being a place where Sikh assert their historical narrative in an independent India where they are a religious minority, often being in religious or political conflict with the nation-state of India. The period between the 1970s and 1990s when there was a wave of state museums being founded by governments in India coincided with a period of Indian Sikh history with much strife and hardship. Sikhs museums exist both as a place where their contributions to India are depicted but also as places where their uniqueness is asserted to resist assimilation into the Hindu-majority and their rejection of official government narratives of certain events involving Sikhs. They also are tools to reach multiple audiences, including the Sikhs, the ruling-class, other Indians, and foreigners. In fall of 2014, a diasporic Sikh museum was established in the Toronto area of Canada, with the foundation of the Sikh Heritage Museum of Canada. In the UK, there exists a Sikh Museum Initiative (SMI) and the Anglo Sikh Virtual Museum was launched.

A unique feature of Sikh museums is that rather than hosting historical and old paintings (they contain few artefacts or objects of historical value and lack a motive to collect, preserve, and classify historical works), such as miniatures, Sikh museums mostly house modern oil-paintings on canvas (from the 20th century and later) in western academic or realist style depicting scenes from Sikh history. According to Kanika Singh, whilst the modern paintings in Sikh museums lack conventional historical, religious or artistic value (with them neither being relics, unique, rare, or antique), they instead hold value in the story they portray and are influential for popular religious practice. Objects associated with a Sikh guru or their associates (such as clothing, manuscripts [including signatures], utensils, and weapons) tend to be housed in a gurdwara as sacred relics and not displayed in a museum, with such santified relics shown to the congregation on special occasions as a ritual (known as darshan). For example, in Amritsar the weapons associated with the Sikh gurus are kept at the Akal Takht whilst history paintings, maps, coin, weapons and manuscripts are kept at the Central Sikh Museum. However, the Central Sikh Museum does have a distinction of housing some weapons of the Sikh gurus in glass cases but the weapons with the greatest importance remain kept at the Akal Takht. The Central Sikh Museum is one of the few Sikh museums which houses relics associated with the Sikh gurus as usually they are housed inside gurdwaras, such as how the sacred relics of the guru at Gurdwara Sis Ganj Sahib are kept there while the Bhai Mati Das Museum does not hold any. Sikh museums tend to have large scriptural collections, incorporate oral histories and interactive exhibits as tacit knowledge for deeper understanding of cultural nuances, and have digitisation projects for preservation and to improve accessibility. Exhibits developed early-on in the Sikh tradition, such as the display of artefacts, especially weapons (shastars), at sites like the Akal Takht. Sikh museums rarely have a curator and usually a resident artist is hired to create works to be displayed at the site. The sacred overlaps with the secular at such sites, with the boundary between a shrine and museum being blurred, and visitors usually come to look at paintings depicting stories they are usually familiar with.

Many gurdwaras and other Sikh locations host small museums and art-galleries. The most important gurdwaras tend to have a dedicated museum, perhaps as an independent building while some smaller sites may only have a small room for the purpose and a few canvasses or painting-prints on display. Some Sikh museums exist independently of any associated gurdwara.

Some Sikh museums include:

- Central Sikh Museum (Amritsar, est. 1958)
- Interpretation Centre, Golden Temple (Amritsar, est. 2016)
- War Museum (Amritsar)
- Maharaja Ranjit Singh Museum (Amritsar)
- Ranjit Singh Panorama (Amritsar)
- Museum Sri Amritsar (Amritsar)
- Ram Bagh Museum (Amritsar)
- Partition Museum (Amritsar, est. 2017)
- Bhai Mati Das Museum (Chandni Chowk, Delhi, est. 2001)
- Baba Baghel Singh Sikh Heritage Multimedia Museum (New Delhi, est. 1970s, re-opened 2014)
- Sri Guru Teg Bahadur Sikh Museum (Anandpur Sahib, est. 1983)
- Historical Picture Gallery (Anandpur Sahib)
- Virasat-e-Khalsa (Anandpur Sahib, est. 2011)
- Khalsa Heritage Centre (Anandpur Sahib)
- Anglo-Sikh War Memorial (Ferozeshah, est. 1976)
- Qila Mubarak (Patiala)
- Sheesh Mahal Art Gallery (Patiala)
- Archaeological Museum (Hoshiarpur)
- Archaeological Museum (Sanghol)
- Village Life and Cultural Museum (Ludhiana)
- Science City (Kapurthala)
- Site Museum (Dholbaha)
- Sikh Ajaibghar (Balongi)
- Gurdwara Mehdiana Sahib
- Sikh Heritage Museum of Canada
- Dome located in Española, United States, associated with the 3HO sect of Sikhism, consisting of artefacts collected by Yogi Bhajan which have been catalogued

==== Other museums ====
Material related to Sikhs can be found in the archives and collections of museums throughout the world, with various exhibitions being held dedicated to Sikh artwork.

In Punjab, the Lahore Museum was established in 1865, which introduced the practice of displaying traditional miniature paintings on a wall. In Pakistan, the Lahore Fort Museum contains the Sikh Gallery which hosts the Princess Bamba Collection. The Lahore Museum features a Sikh Gallery, with most of the collection having been donated by the Faqir Syed Jalal ud Din Trust. The Fakir Khana Museum features Sikh-related artefacts. Peshawar Museum has some items related to Sikhs, especially coins.

The Montreal Museum of Fine Arts was the first Canadian museum to have a dedicated area for Sikh art, organised by Baljit Singh Chadha and established in 2022. The Royal Ontario Museum planned in 2025 to open a permanent gallery dedicated to Sikh art in 2028 that will be titled a Gallery of Sikh Art & Culture.

In the United States, the Smithsonian Institute launched its Sikh Heritage Project in 2000. The Sikh Gallery in National Museum of Natural History, Smithsonian Institution in Washington D.C. was inaugurated in 2004, being established by Amrik Singh Chatha, Sohan Singh Chaudhary, Gurdeep Singh Malik, and Gurpreet Singh Ahuja. In 2017, the Khanuja Art Sikh Gallery was founded in Phoenix. The Phoenix Art Museum has a Sikh art gallery known as the Dr Darshan Singh and Ajit Kaur Khanuja and Mr Jaswant Singh and Mohinder Kaur Sikh Art Gallery.

=== Exhibitions ===
Various exhibitions dedicated toward or featuring Sikh artwork have been held over the years. The amount of exhibitions increased after the celebration of the Khalsa tercentenary in 1999.

In British India, one of the earliest exhibitions featuring Sikh artwork was The Punjab Exhibition of Arts and Manufactures held in Lahore in January 1864. The Delhi Exhibition of 1902–1903 held for the Delhi Durbar of 1903 featured Sikh artwork. After independence, an exhibition titled Piety and Splendour: Sikh Heritage in Art was curated by B. N. Goswamy in 1999–2000 at the National Museum of India, New Delhi. The All India Fine Arts and Crafts Society of New Delhi in April 2019 held an exhibition titled The Sikh: An Occidental Romance organized by the Hubris Foundation that featured replicas of paintings and photographs of Sikhs taken by Westerners in the 19th and 20th centuries. It took place in Delhi, Punjab Kala Bhawan in Chandigarh, and the Gobindgarh Fort in Amritsar. Panjab Digital Library has hosted numerous exhibitions featuring Sikh artwork over the years, mostly in India.

In the United Kingdom, the exhibition Arts of the Sikh Kingdoms curated by Susan Stronge was held at the in 1999 at the Victoria and Albert Museum, London and also was held at the Asian Arts Museum, San Francisco and the Royal Ontario Museum, Toronto. Running until mid-January 2010, the exhibition Maharaja – the Splendor of India‘s Royal Courts at the Victoria & Alberta Museum in London showcased Sikh works. Several Sikh-related exhibitions curated by the United Kingdom Punjab Heritage Association (UKPHA) have been held at the Brunei Gallery, SOAS, London, including The Golden Temple of Amritsar: Reflections of the Past (July – September 2011), Empire, Faith & War: The Sikhs and World War One (July – September 2014), and Empire of the Sikhs (July – September 2018). The Sikh Museum Initiative (SMI) organized the Anglo Sikh Wars: Battles, Treaties and Relics exhibition at Newarke Houses Museum from March – June 2017. The Wallace Collection in London hosted an exhibition titled Ranjit Singh: Sikh, Warrior, King from April–October 2024, which drew upon the Toor Collection. A touring exhibition titled Journey of the Mind featuring Sikh artwork by Kanwar Singh was displayed at various locations in the UK from 2021–2025. Splendours of the Sikh Raj: Arms and Armour is being held from 22 November 2025 – 28 February 2027 at Manchester Art Gallery.

In Canada, the Arts of Sikh Kingdom exhibition was held in 2000 at the Royal Ontario Museum and organised by the Suresh Bhalla. The Surrey Art Gallery hosted until 30 August 2026 the exhibition If Gardens Could Dream featuring artwork by Keerat Kaur.

In the United States, the exhibition Splendors of the Punjab: Sikh Art and Literature was held in 1992 in Berkeley University. Sikhs: Legacy of the Punjab was held between 2004–2015 by the Smithsonian’s Asian Cultural History Program and other institutions in collaboration with the Sikh Heritage Foundation. I See No Stranger: Early Sikh Art and Devotion (September 2006 – January 2007) was held at Rubin Museum of Art, New York in collaboration with the Sikh Art and Film Foundation and The Sikh Foundation which featured Sikh works from the 16th to 19th centuries. Between March–June 2017, the Asian Art Museum hosted an exhibition titled Saints and Kings: Arts, Culture, and Legacy of the Sikhs. The Fowler Museum hosted a Sikh exhibition titled I Will Meet You Yet Again between 28 January – 26 May 2024 curated by Sonia Dhami and Syona Puliady, covering topics such as the 1947 partition, 1984 anti-Sikh violence, Sikh women, the Farmer's Protest, and American-Sikh history.

In Singapore, the exhibition titled Sikhs in Singapore - A Story Untold was held at the Indian Heritage Centre in Little India from 26 March – 30 September 2021. It featured some items from the Khanuja and Kapany collections.

=== Collections ===
Some private collections that hold Sikh art include:

- Toor Collection
- Khanuja Collection
- Kapany Collection
- Sursinghwala Collection
- Bhai Rupa Collection
- Bagrian Collection
- Bilga Collection
- Darauli Collection
- Patiala Collection
- Nabha Collection

==== Kapany Collection ====
As an art collector, Narinder Singh Kapany specialised in Sikh art. He provided paintings and other objects on loan for the "Arts of the Sikh Kingdoms" exhibition, which was held at London's Victoria & Albert Museum beginning in March 1999. From there, the exhibition proceeded to the Asian Art Museum of San Francisco (with the Sikh Foundation as a sponsor) and opened in May 2000 at the Royal Ontario Museum in Toronto. The exhibition follows "Splendors of the Punjab: Sikh Art and Literature in 1992" organised by Kapany in collaboration with the Asian Art Museum and UC Berkeley to celebrate the 25th anniversary of the Sikh Foundation. As an artist, Kapany's 'dynoptic' sculptures were displayed at the Exploratorium of the Palace of Fine Arts in San Francisco in 1972 and at museums and art galleries in Chicago, Monterey, Palo Alto, and Stanford.

==== Khanuja Collection ====
Parvinderjit Singh Khanuja is a Sikh doctor who began collecting Sikh artwork in 2007 as a form of seva by preserving Sikh heritage. He helped found a Sikh art gallery at the Phoenix Art Museum.

==== Toor Collection ====
Davinder Singh Toor, a British Sikh who operates a pharmaceutical company, began collecting Sikh works after volunteering for the Victoria and Albert Museum's exhibition on Sikh arts in 1999. Toor collects with the aim to reconstruct the visuals of Sikh-rule. There is a goal of establishing a museum to house and display the Toor Collection. The Toor Collection contains paintings, written work, photographs, maps, and craftwork. The collection is documented in a companion publication, whose introduction is written by William Dalrymple.

The Toor Collection contains works of native artists, such as the familial atelier of Nainsukh of Guler, Ram Chand of Patiala, Sheikh Basharat Ullah of Patiala & Nabha, the familial atelier of Purkha (fl. 1780–1820) of Kangra, the atelier of Imam Bakhsh Lahori of Lahore, Rattan Singh of Lahore & Delhi, Muhammad Bakhsh of Lahore, Bishan Singh (1836–ca.1900) of Amritsar, Kapur Singh (fl. 1860–1890) of Amritsar, the familial atelier of Abdullah of the Punjab Plains (attributed), Harbhagat Singh of Lahore, and Sani the 'Draftsman' of Jalandhar.

In-addition to native artists, the works of foreign, European artists are also kept in the collection, such as August Schoefft (1809–1888), Colesworthey Grant (1813–1880), Egron Lundgren (1815–1875), Helen Catherine Douglas Mackenzie (ca.1819–ca.1910), Walter Fane (1828–1885), George Landseer (1834–1878), Isabella Frances Gill, Mortimer Menpes (1855–1938), Lucien Lévy-Dhurmer (1865–1953), and Fred Taylor (1875–1963).

Photographs taken by the following individuals and studios are kept in the collection: Maharaja Duleep Singh (1838–1893), Ernst Becker (1826–88), Margaret Bourke-White (1904–1971), William Baker (died 1880), Samuel Bourne (1834–1912), Fred Bremner (1863–1942), James Craddock (fl. 1861–1890), Lala Deen Dayal (1844–1905), Francis Frith Studio, Herbert Ponting (1870–1935), Arthur Robertson (fl. 1960s), John Saché (1865–1882), Charles Shepherd (1858–1878), Felice Beato (1832–1909), Jean Baptiste Oscar Malitte (c 1820–1905), George Western (1837–1907), John W. Clarke (ca.1823–1893), John Moffat (1819–1894), Antoine Claudet (1797–1867), Henri Claudet (1829–1880), W. Farrell & Co., Valentine Blanchard, John Burke (1843–1900), G. W. Lawrie (fl. 1880's–1890s), Hugh Owen (1808–1897), Theodore J. Hoffman (ca. 1855–1921), P. A. Johnston (died 1891), Randolph B. Holmes (1888–1973), Henri R. Ferger (fl. 1920s), John W. Brooke (fl. 1916–1918), Mela Ram (fl. 1910–1920), and William Willoughby Hooper (1837–1912).

Works by the following cartographers can be found in the Toor Collection: Rigobert Bonne (1727–1794), John Cary (ca. 1754–1835), John Luffman (1756–1846), Robert Wilkinson (fl. ca. 1768–1825), and John Arrowsmith (1780–1873).

Creations by the following craftsmen can be found in the collection: Muhammad Hayat of Punjab and Henry Wilkinson of Pall Mall, London.

== Gallery ==
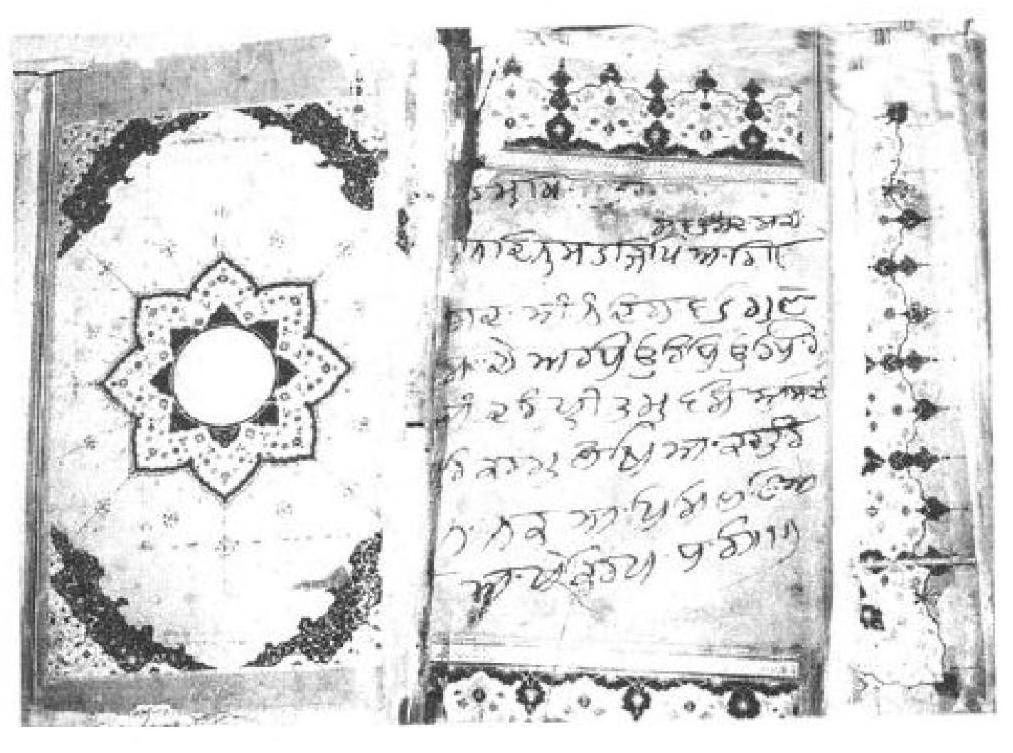
Illuminated and illustrated opening preface and introduction folio, featuring a shamsa, of the Guru Nanak Dev University Manuscript (GNDU MS 1245), circa 1599

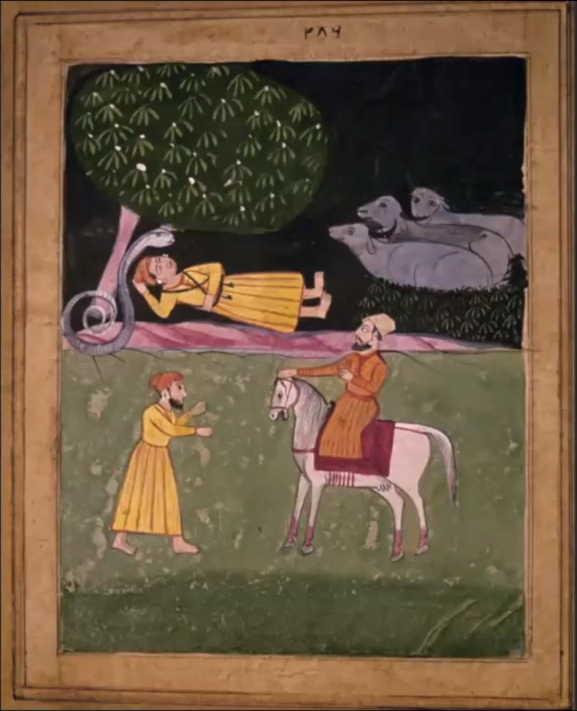
Janamsakhi painting of the story of Guru Nanak being shaded by the cobra from a manuscript dated to 1658

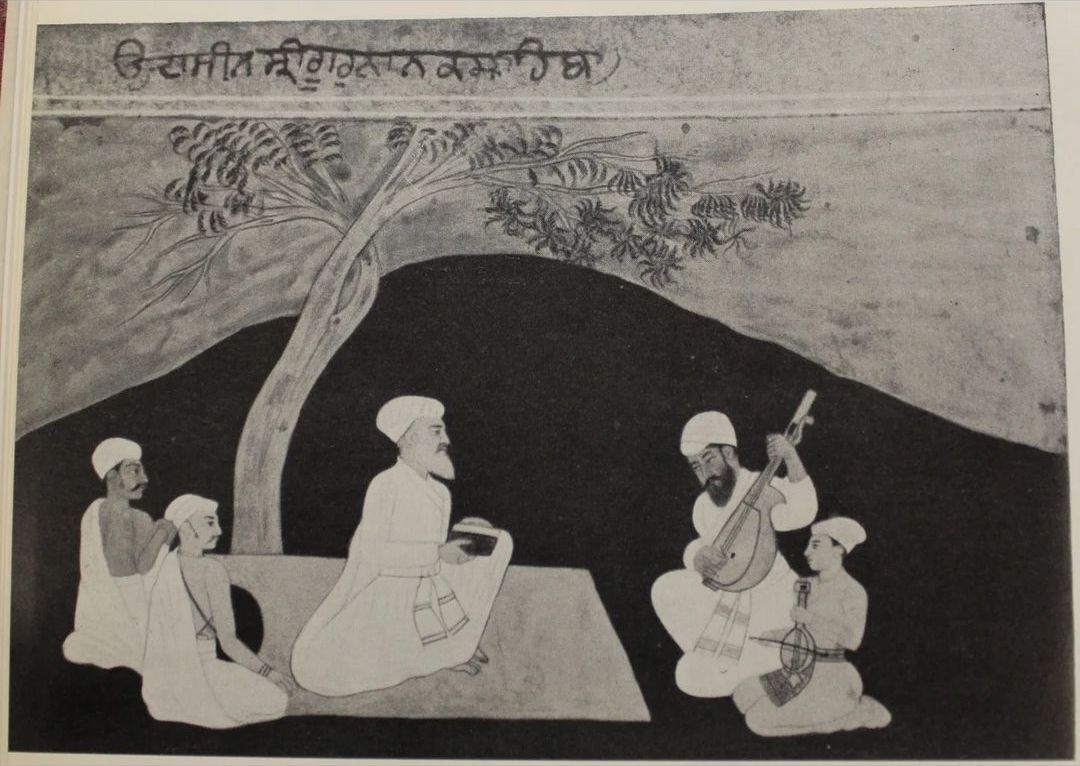
Miniature painting of Guru Nanak listening to musicians, circa 1680. One of the earliest extant or discovered painting of the first Sikh guru.

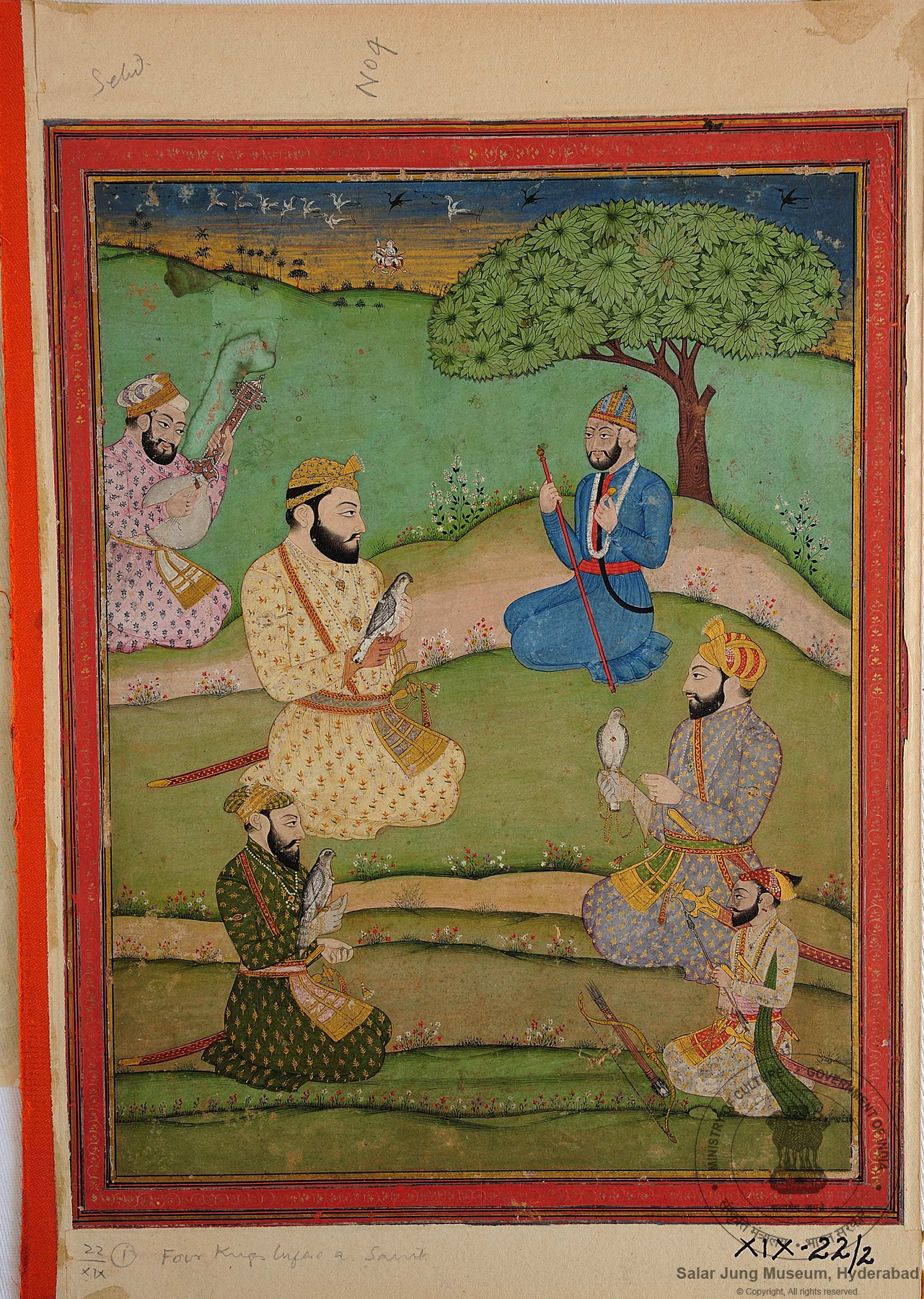
Painting of five Sikh gurus and Bhai Mardana, Deccan, circa late 1770s

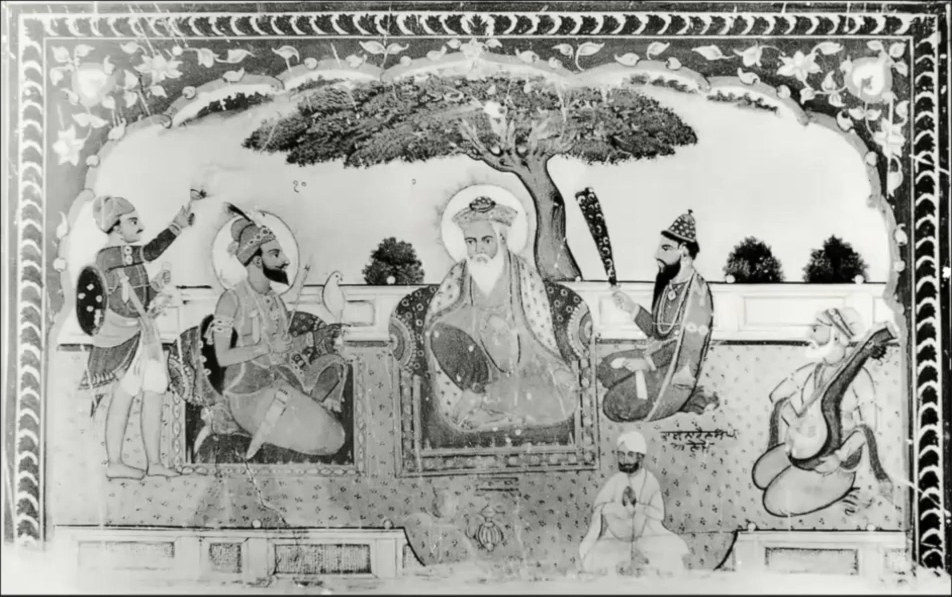
Mural of Guru Nanak and Guru Gobind Singh meeting under a tree from Gurdwara Ramsar (no longer extant), circa late 19th century

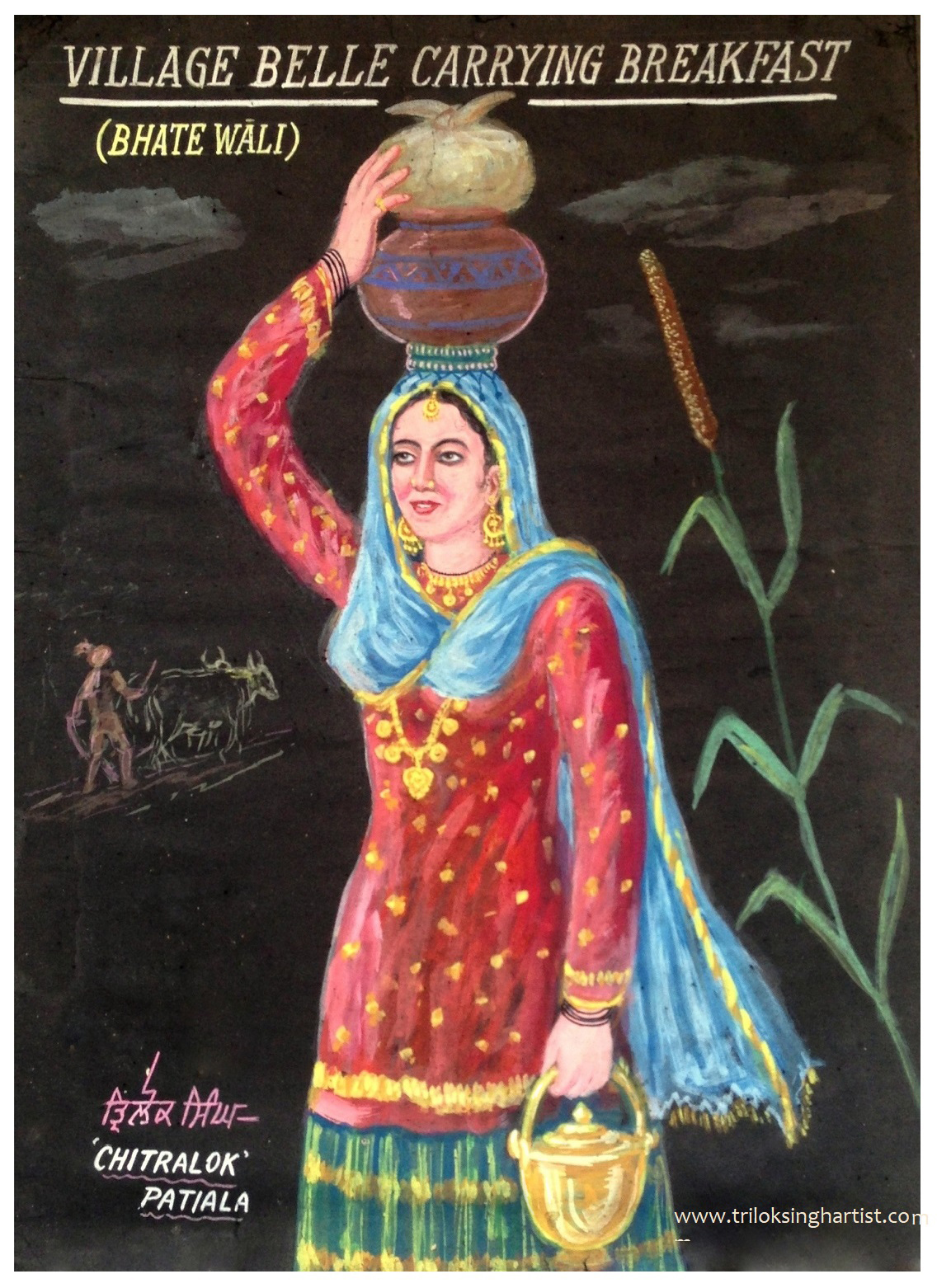
Painting of a rural Punjabi woman by Trilok Singh Chitarkari

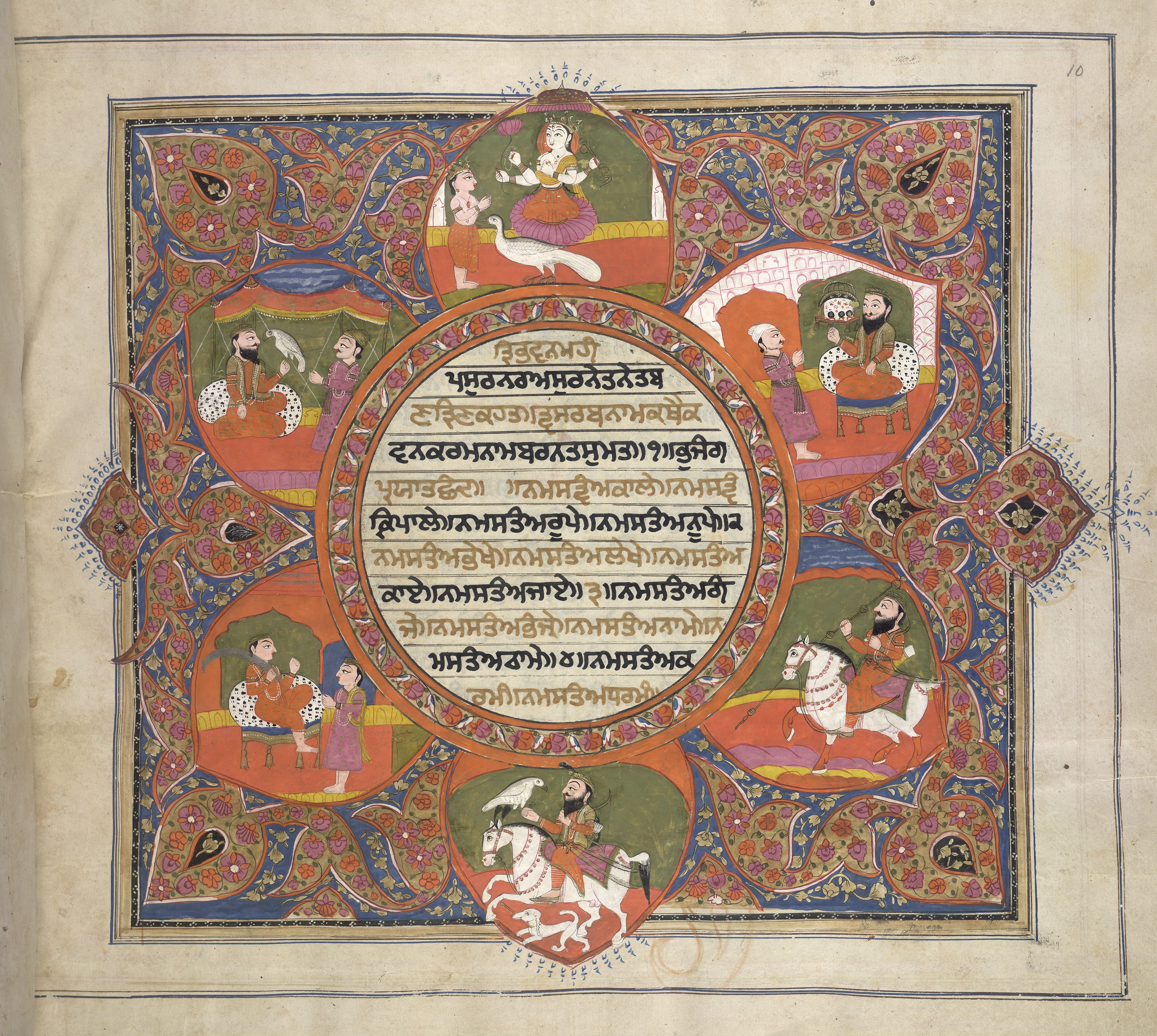
A frontispiece to the Dasam Granth.

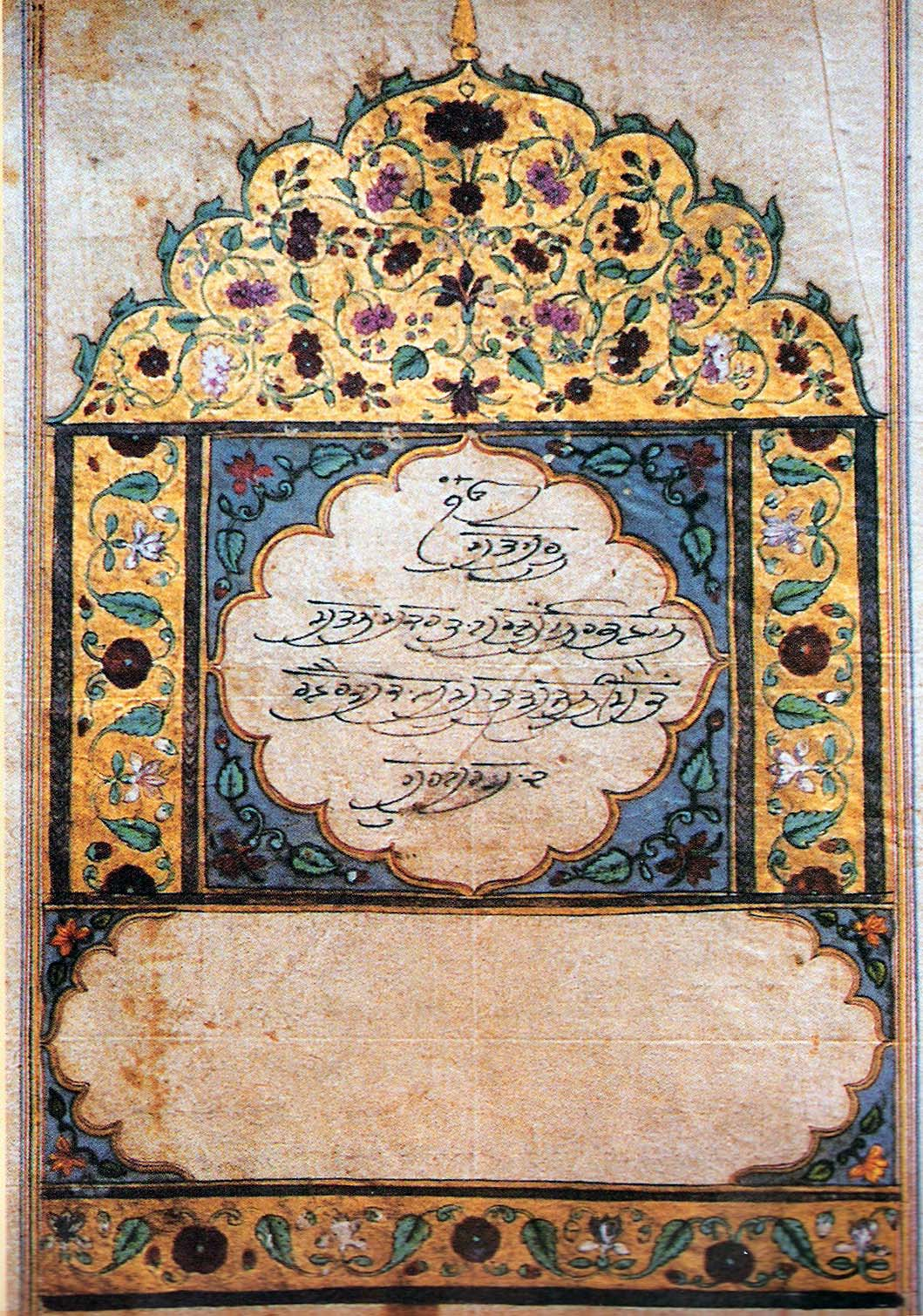
Illuminated Adi Granth folio with nisan (autograph or signature) of Guru Gobind Singh.

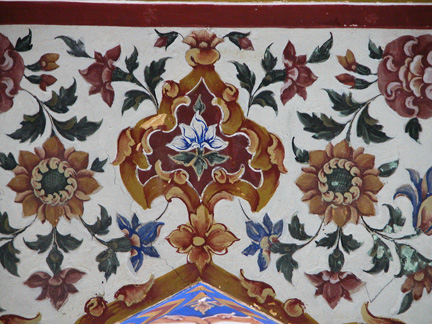
Detail from Gurdwara Baba Atal.

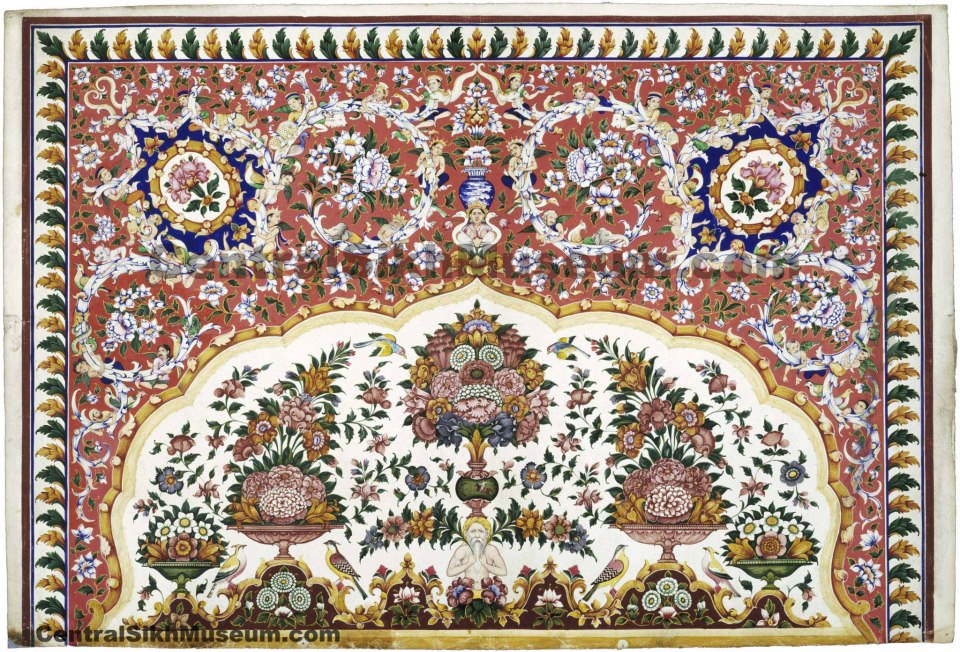
An Opaque Watercolour on paper copy of Nakashi 1880c

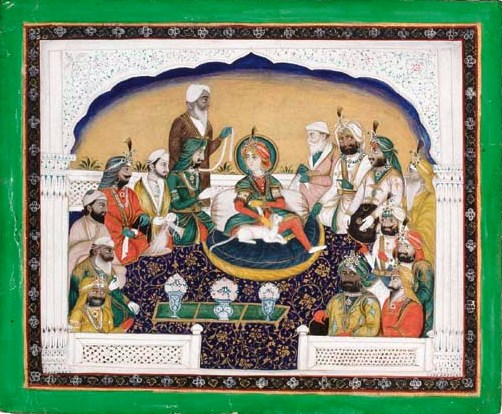
Painting of the durbar of Maharaja Dalip Singh Sukerchakia.

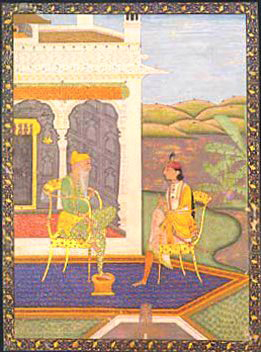
Painting of Ranjit Singh and Hira Singh of Nabha.

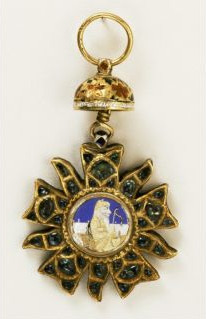
The Sikh Order of Merit with a Portrait of Ranjit Singh, directly inspired by the French Légion d'honneur

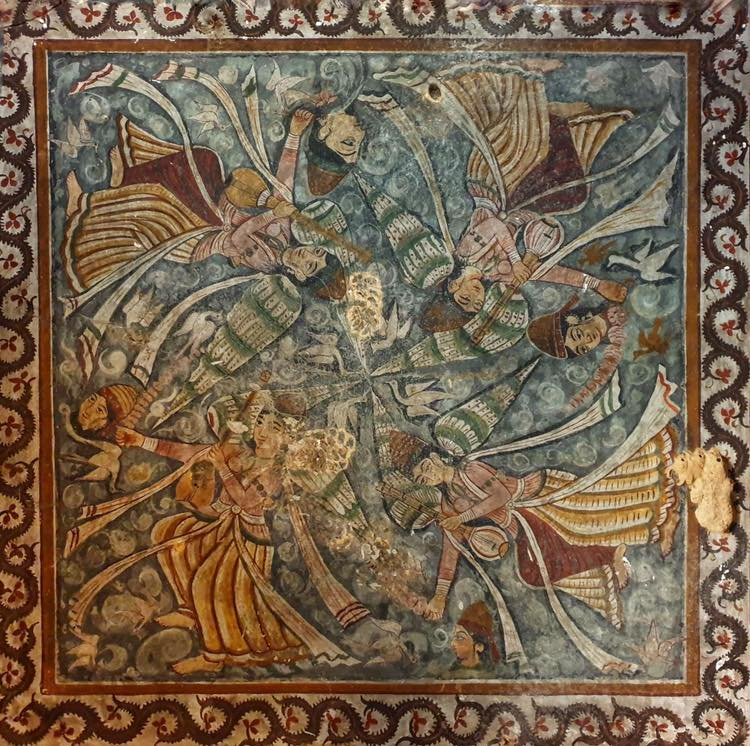
Ceiling fresco of female figures from an abandoned Gurdwara located in Mangat village in Pakistan

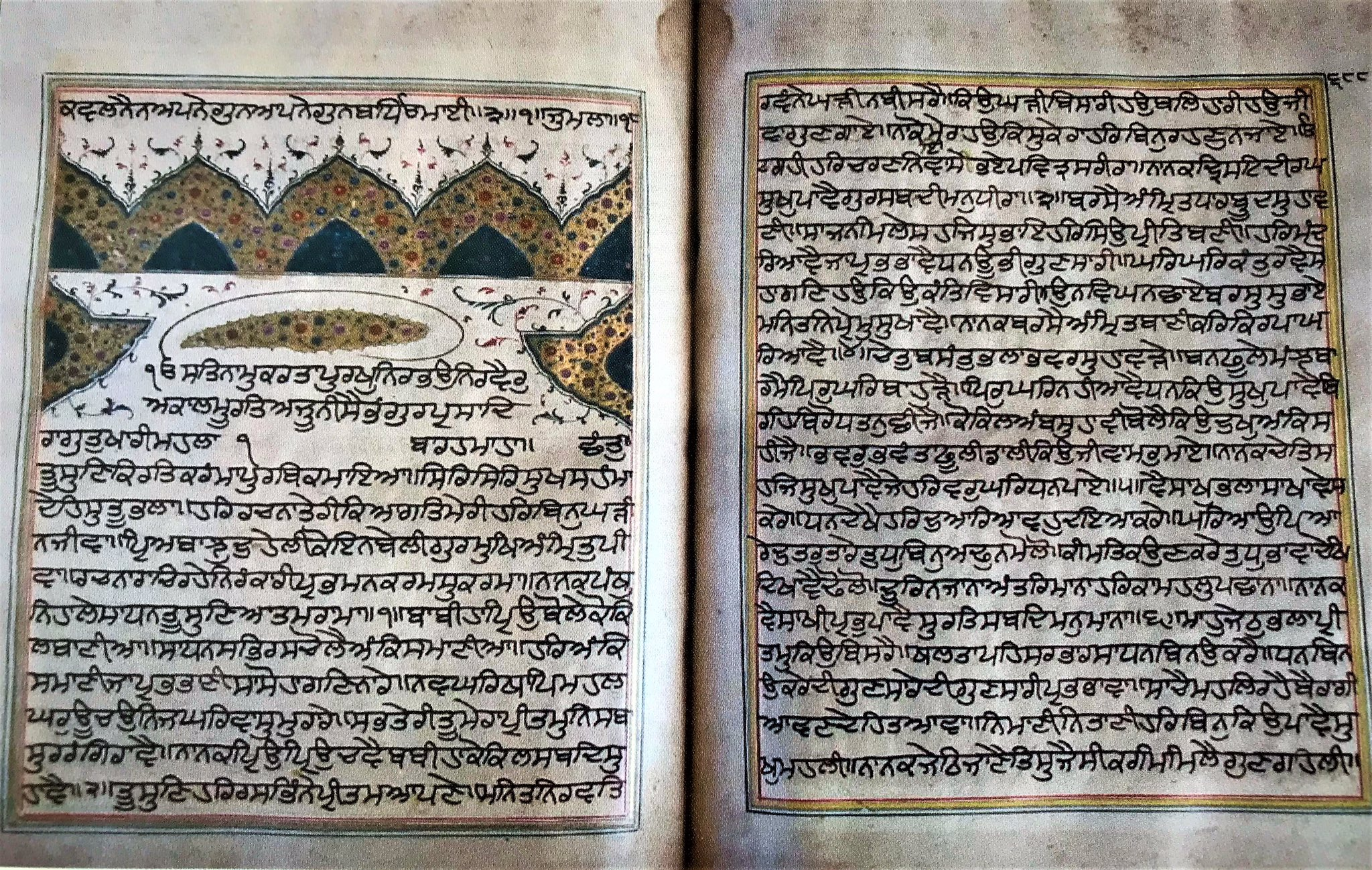
Guru Granth Sahib manuscript housed at Sri Keshgarh Sahib, Anandpur and dated to 1803 B.S. (1746 C.E.) beautifully decorated with gold and floral arabesques

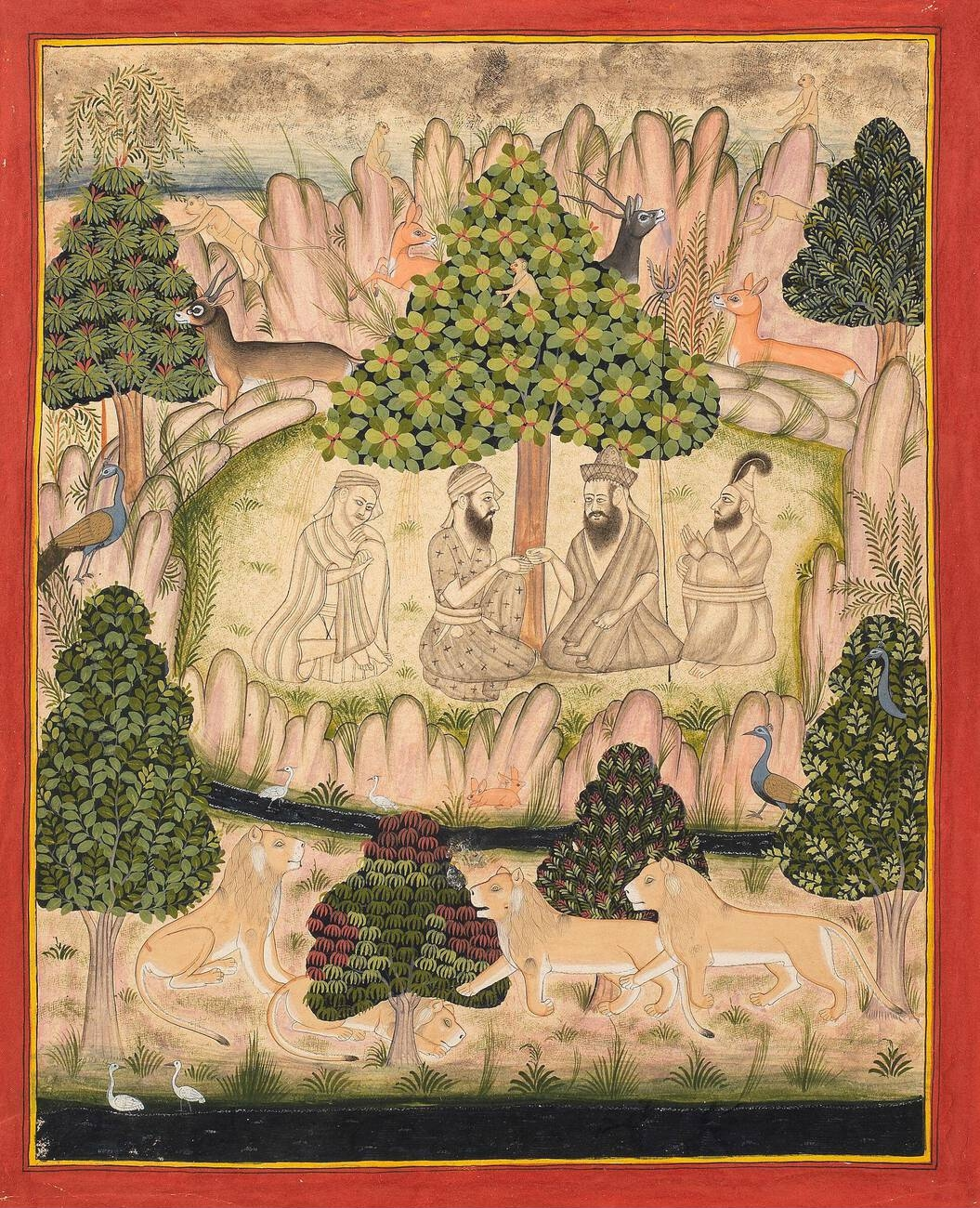
Holy men visiting Guru Nanak in a mountainous forest, Mewar painting

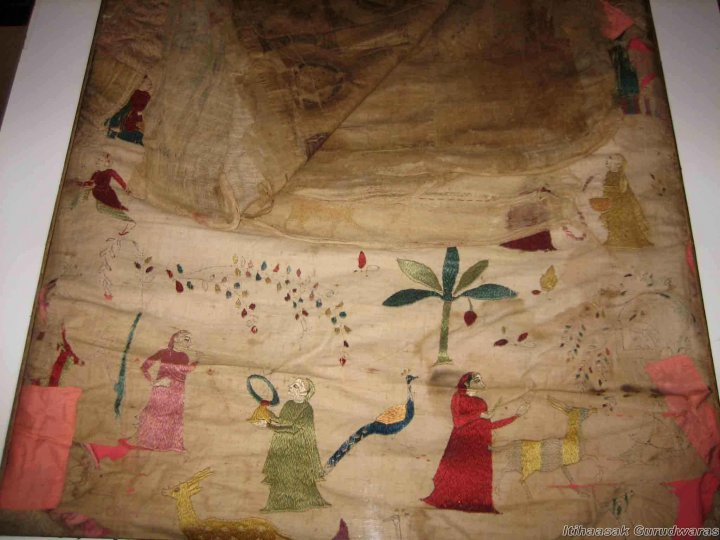
Illustrations of female figures on a chola (chogha) robe that is said to have belonged to Guru Nanak which was made by and given as a gift by his sister, Bebe Nanaki

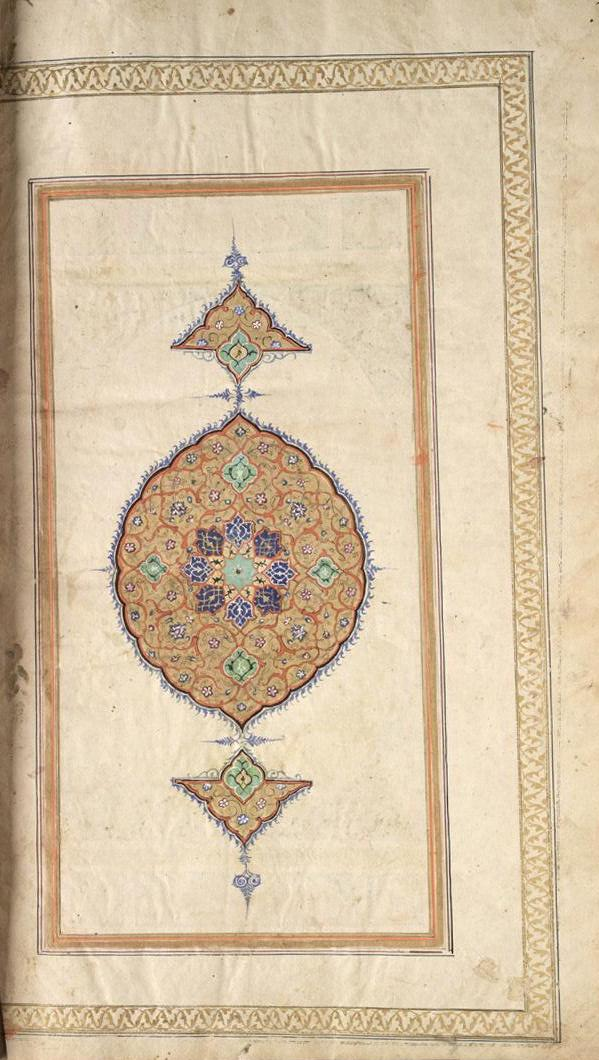
Shamsa artwork, from an illustrated 'Ain-i-Akbari' manuscript commissioned by the Sikh Empire

== List of notable Sikh artists ==
=== 19th century ===
- Kehar Singh
- Bishan Singh
- Kishan Singh
- Kapur Singh
- Ishar Singh
- Lahora Singh

=== 20th century ===
- Lal Singh Musawir
- Gian Singh Naqqash
- G. S. Sohan Singh
- Mohinder Singh
- Phulan Rani
- Amrita Sher-Gil
- S. G. Thakur Singh
- Sobha Singh
- Trilok Singh Chitarkar
- Arpana Caur
- Devender Singh

=== 21st century ===
- The Singh Twins

== See also ==
- Sikh culture
- Sikh architecture
- Sikh scriptures
- Pahari painting
- Kangra painting
- Rajput painting
- Mughal painting
- Conservation and restoration of frescos
