= Amolak Singh (artist) =

Sikh artist (1950–2006)

Portrait of the Sikh artist Amolak Singh

Amolak Singh (2 October 1950 – 15 October 2006) was a Sikh artist. He was the curator artist for the Central Sikh Museum and also served as the resident artist for the Bhai Mati Das Museum, being employed by the Delhi Sikh Gurdwara Management Committee. He was a disciple of Sobha Singh.

== Biography ==
He was born in Amritsar on 2 October 1950, with him studying at Sri Guru Ramdas High School, Amritsar. In 1968, his family moved to Delhi and he studied at Central City College, Patel Nagar in Delhi where he received training from Prithvi Soni and Mahesh Kumar Sehgal on creating banners. He shifted to Mumbai with Mahesh Kumar where he was patronised by S. M. Pandit, Patel Sardar, Ved Prakash, Ram Kumar, and Tilak Saheb. From 1970 to 1974, he worked in Bollywood by making banners and film-sets. Between 1974 and 1976, he was a student of Sobha Singh at Adhretta in Himachal Pradesh. Amolak moved back to Delhi in Patel Nagar where he set-up his own art studio and began creating Sikh history paintings. In 1980, Satbir Singh invited him to Amritsar where he began working for the Central Sikh Museum as an artist which lasted fourteen years and involved the restoration of the site after Operation Blue Star. He later worked for the Baba Baghel Singh Museum and in 2001 he began working for the Bhai Mati Das Museum as the creative artist and creator. He also was commissioned by the Punjab & Sind Bank and by the museum of Gurdwara Paonta Sahib to create artwork. He died in his sleep at Batala on 15 October 2006.

== Collection ==
A hundred of his works are at the Central Sikh Museum while thirty-nine of his works are held in the Bhai Mati Das Museum. It is claimed he created around 400 paintings. Other collections of his work are held at Punjab & Sind Bank, PNB Finance, the Bank of Punjab, and Baba Baghel Singh Museum.
