= Andretta, Himachal Pradesh =

Village in Himachal Pradesh, India

Coordinates: 32.0639°N 76.563°E

Andretta is a village and an artists' colony in Himachal Pradesh. The artists' colony was established in the 1920s, when Irish theatre artiste and environmentalist, Norah Richards, shifted here from Lahore. Near Palampur in the Kangra District, with Dhauladhar range of the Himalayas as a backdrop, Andretta over the years has attracted many noted artists, theatre practitioners, painters and more recently potters. Two of the people who became associated with it early on were painters Sobha Singh and B. C. Sanyal.

== History ==
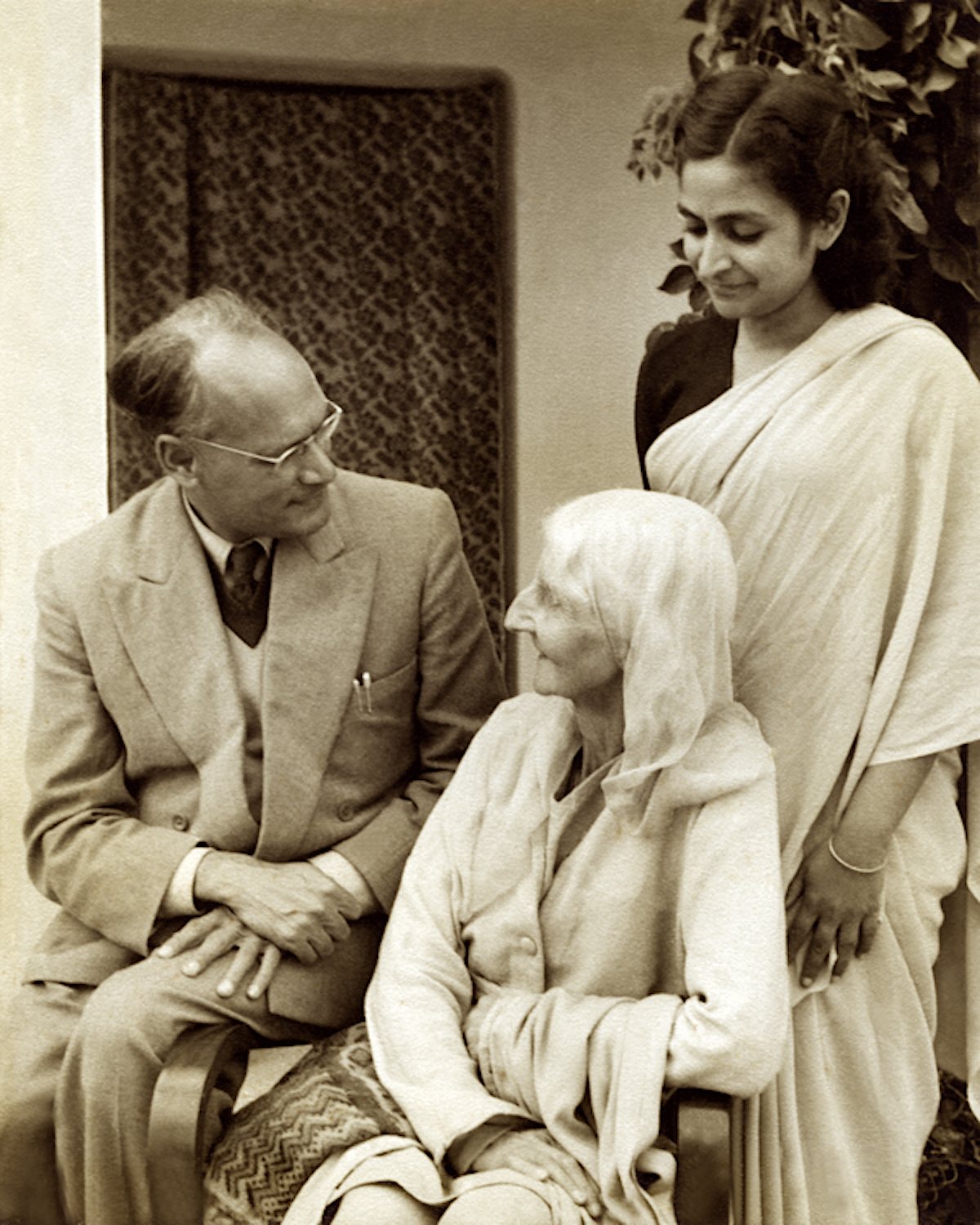
M. S. Randhawa, Norah Richards and Amrita Pritam at Andretta, c. 1960

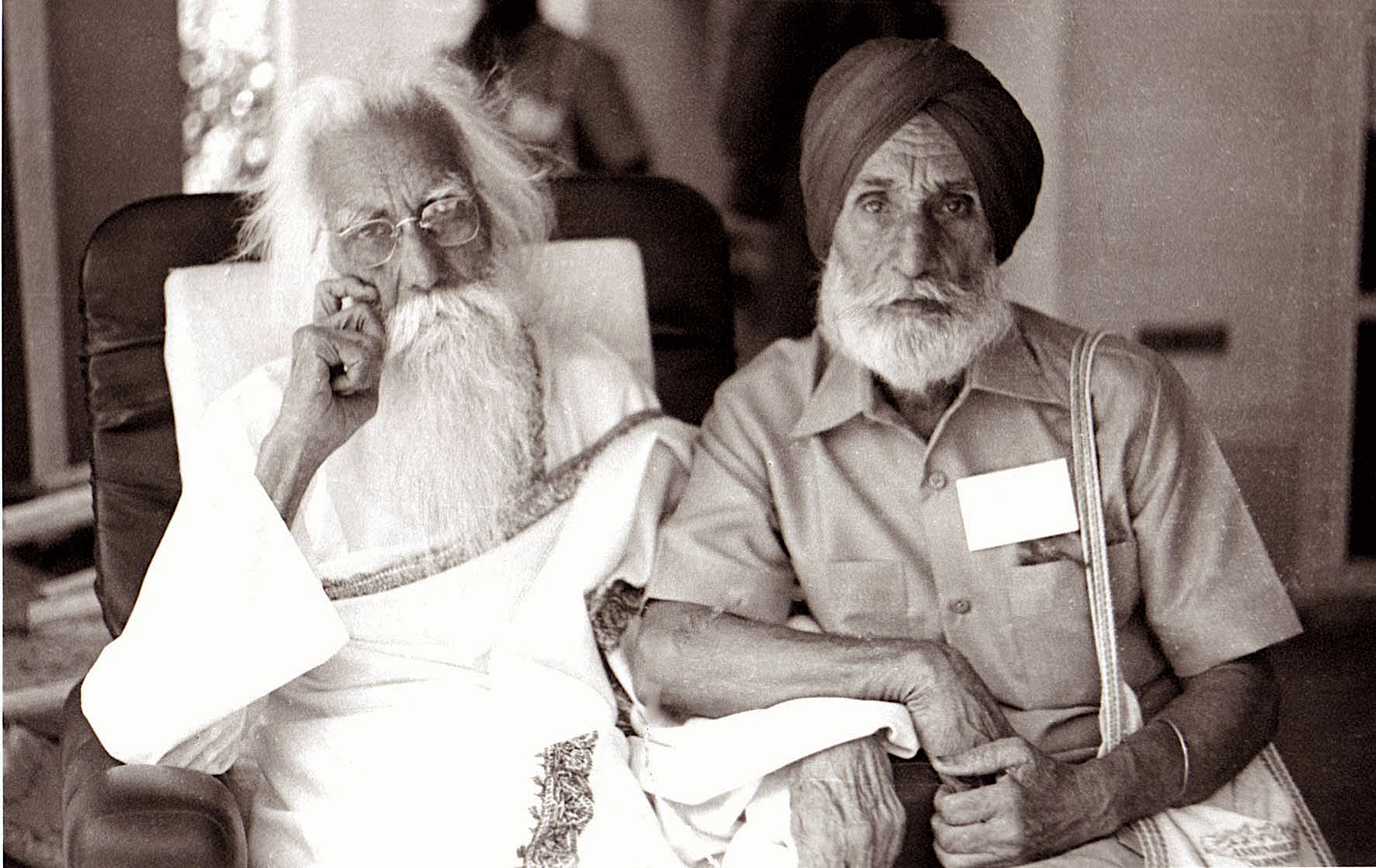
Artist Sobha Singh with scholar Niranjan Singh Nakodari (r) at Andretta, Apr 1986.

Norah, an actress originally from Ireland, married Philip Richards, who was a professor at Government College, Lahore. She arrived in Lahore, an important cultural centre, in 1908. She later became vice-principal at Dayal Singh College, Lahore.

In the following years, she played a pivotal role in establishing modern Punjabi theatre, staging plays with Punjabi themes. After the death of her husband, she went back briefly, only to return in 1924, when she made Andretta, a village near Palampur, her home. She built a traditional Kangra-style mud house, known as ‘Chameli Niwas’, employing local style and materials, using mud, slate and bamboo. She also built a makeshift proscenium and invited Punjabi theatre amateurs and professionals to perform plays.

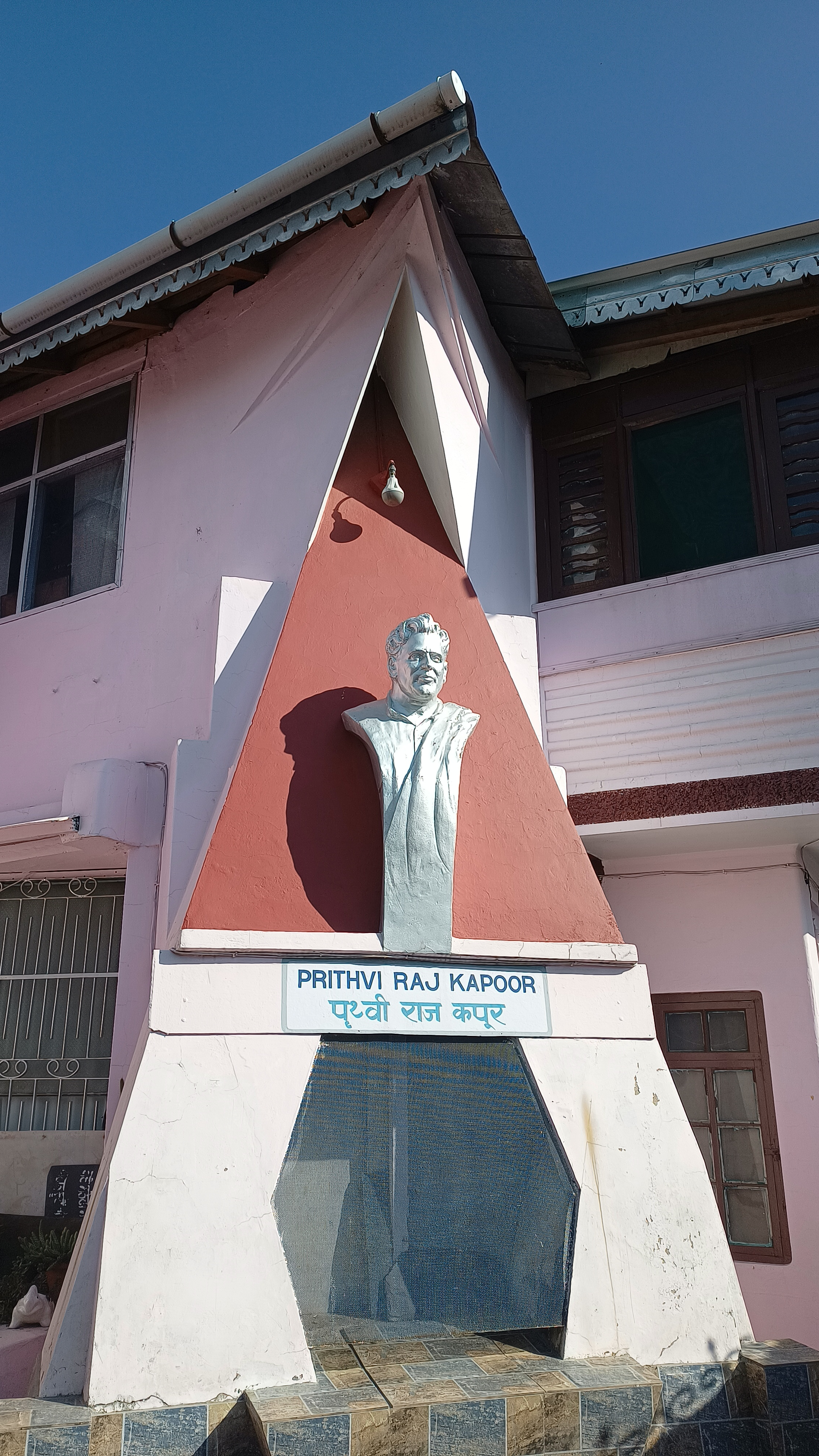
Outer Wall of the Sobha Singh Art Gallery

In 1935, the District Commissioner of Kangra gave Richards 15 acres of land, and the Woodland Estate came into existence. She started a school of drama, and in time the village was known as "Mem-da-pind" (Village of Memsahib).

In its early days, travel to the village was not easy. It took a 12-hour train journey, followed by a bus ride, and the last nine miles from Banuri (the nearest village) were covered on foot. Even so, it started attracting artists from all over, especially Lahore.

This included painter B. C. Sanyal and professor Jai Dayal Singh, a pupil of Philip Richards from Lahore University, through the 1940s. Sanyal started organising painting exhibitions to fund the Norah Centre for Arts and a resort. Noted painter, Sobha Singh, most known for making Sikh religious paintings, moved in and stayed here till his death in 1986. Richards nurtured Punjabi theatre through the 1940s and 1960s, and came to be known as the "grandmother of Punjabi theatre."

Further on, Gurucharan Singh, a noted potter who started the Delhi Blue Pottery in 1952, established a base here. Active till the end, he died in 1995 at the age of 99. Freda Bedi, mother of actor Kabir Bedi, who converted to Buddhism, lived at the village for a while.

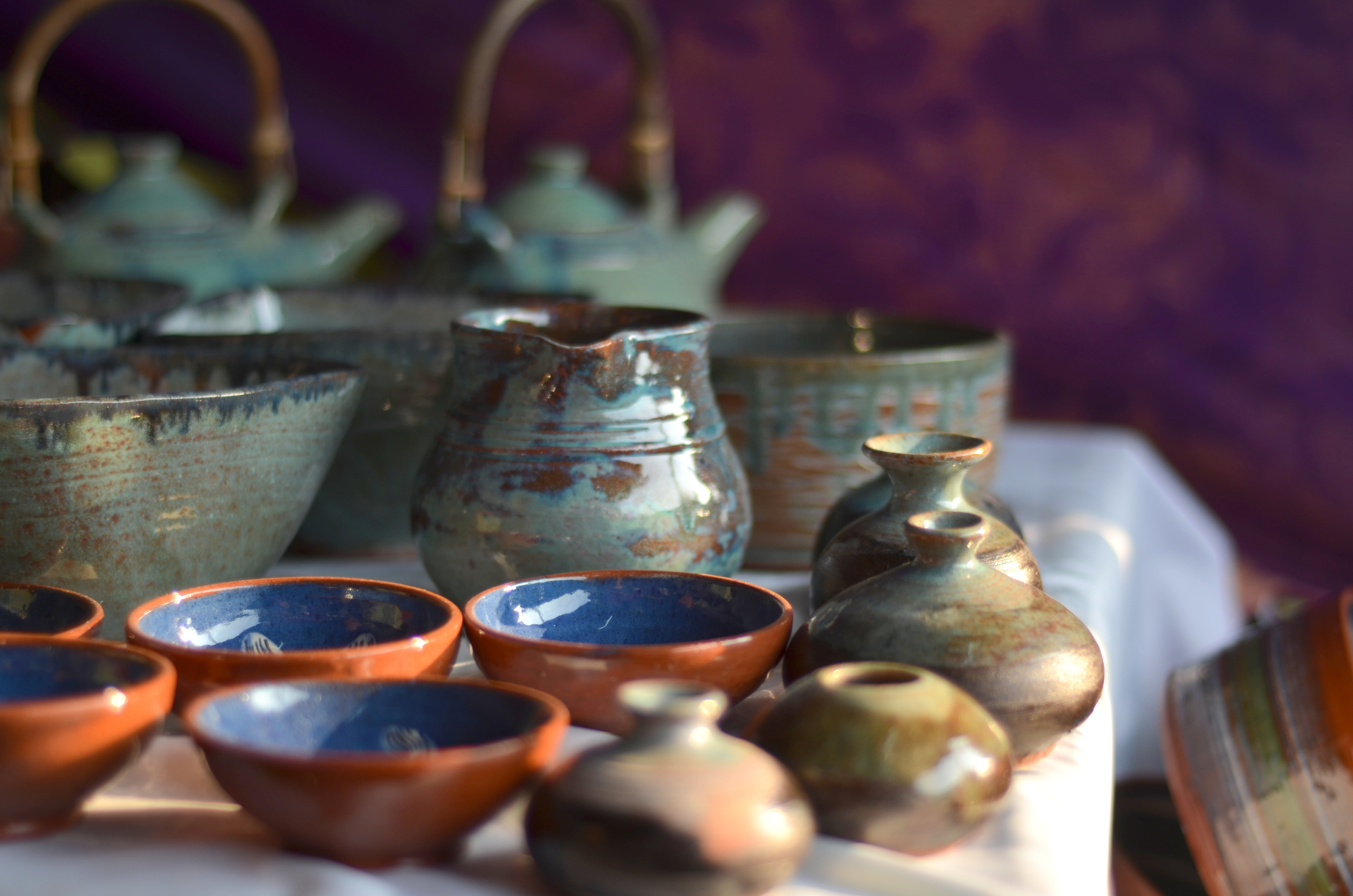
Andretta pottery at Dastkar Bazaar, Delhi.

In 1983, Mansimran "Mini" Singh, son of noted potter Gurcharan Singh, and his wife Mary Singh moved here and started Andretta Pottery and Craft Society with a production studio that produces earthen slipware and a terracotta museum. They set up a Central Government Rural Marketing Centre with a grant of Rs 1,35,000 to provide assistance to potters. The society runs three-month-long residential courses for potters. Today, pottery from Andretta is sold at outlets across India.

Later in life, Richards was made a fellow by the Punjabi University in Patiala, while in turn she willed her house and land around it to the university. Today, the estate of Norah Richards has been renovated and maintained by the university. Each year on her birthday, 29 October, a Punjabi theatre festival is hosted by the students.

== Tourism ==
Andretta has become a popular tourist attraction of the region. Nearby is Bir-Billing, a paragliding destination. There are some homestays catering to the tourists, otherwise regular accommodations are available at Palampur, a popular tourist destination.

=== Visitors' attractions ===
- Andretta Pottery and Craft Society
- Norah Richard's House
- Norah Richard's Centre for the Arts
- Sobha Singh Art Gallery

== Transport ==
Andretta is situated 20-minute drive or 13 km away from Palampur on the road towards Mandi, Himachal Pradesh. Dharamshala is at a distance of 48 km from Andretta. Nearest railway station is Panchrukhi, 1.9 km and Pathankot Airport is 120 km away.

== Bibliography ==
- Anupa Lal (1998). Pottery and the Legacy of Sardar Gurcharan Singh. Delhi Blue Pottery Trust. ISBN 978-81-900931-0-1.
