= Norah Richards =

Irish actress and playwright

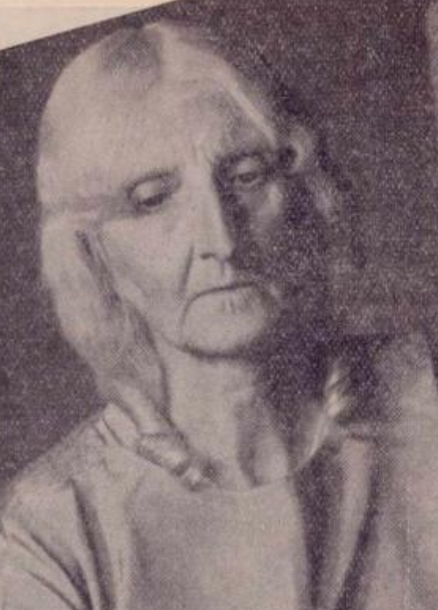
- Norah Richards, from a 1940 issue of The Indian Listener
- Born: Norah Mary Hutman; 29 October 1876; Mullaghglass, County Armagh, Ireland
- Died: 3 March 1971 (aged 94); India
- Occupations: Actor; writer; theatre practitioner
- Spouse: Philip Ernest Richards

Norah Richards (née Hutman; 29 October 1876 – 3 March 1971), known by the stage name Norah Doyle, was an Irish actor, writer and theatre practitioner. Arriving in Punjab in 1911, Richards devoted her life to Punjabi theatre and culture and was later known as the Lady Gregory of the Punjab. In 1970, Punjabi University, Patiala, conferred an honorary DLitt degree on her for her contribution to Punjabi culture, especially Punjabi theatre.

== Early life and education ==
Norah Mary Hutman was born in 1876 in Mullaghglass, County Armagh. She received her formal education in institutions around the world, mainly in Belgium, Oxford University and Sydney.

== Career ==
At a young age, she took to the stage and became a successful actress.

She married Philip Ernest Richards, an English teacher and a Unitarian Christian. She came to India in 1908 as her husband accepted a job to teach English literature at Dyal Singh College in Lahore. (Sardar Dyal Singh Majithia, founder of the college, was an ardent follower of Brahmo Samaj, which had a synergistic relationship with the Unitarian Christian movement.)

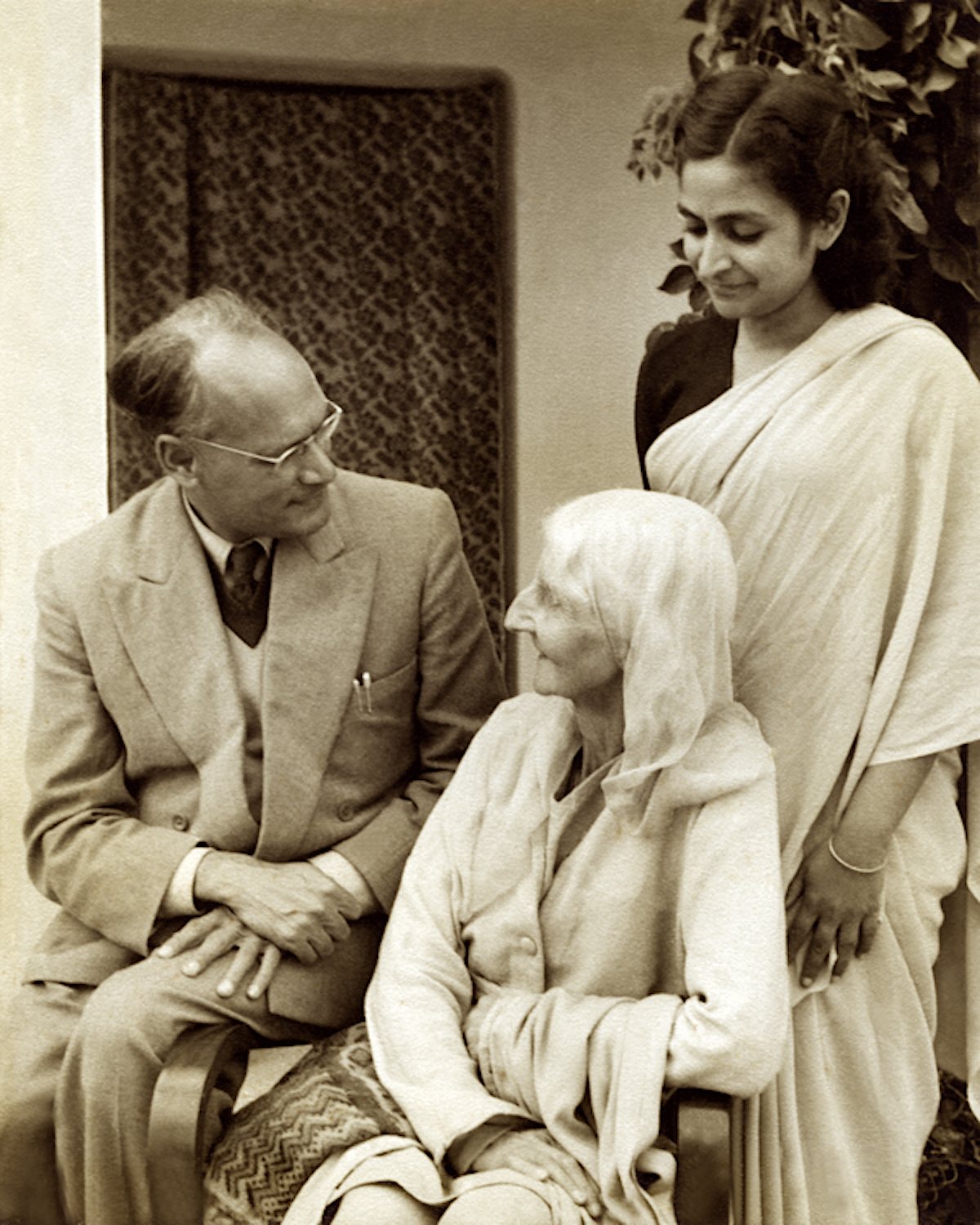
Norah Richards with M. S. Randhawa and Amrita Pritam at Andretta, c. 1960

Richards got involved in cultural activities in the college, and her enthusiasm helped stimulate much serious theatrical activity. Lahore was the home of Punjabi culture in those days. She brought many Punjabi themes under her English pen and directed a few plays. More importantly, she encouraged students to write their own one-act plays and perform them. She had an interest in theosophy and was actively involved in the theosophical movement and home-rule agitation by Dr Annie Besant. In 1914, Richards produced the first modern play in Punjabi Dulhan ("The Bride"), by Ishwar Chander Nanda.

On her husband's death in 1920, she returned to England. She came back to India in 1924. Events worked out well for her to settle in the beautiful Kangra Valley, and she made her home in Andretta, Himachal Pradesh. In those days of British Raj, many Britons had acquired lands in the hill states of British India. One such settler who left for England gave away his property to Richards, which came to be known as the Woodlands Estate.

Living amidst villagers, she chose the same lifestyle and made a mud house with a thatched roof for herself. She named it Chameli Niwas. Her 15 acres (6.1 ha) of estate covered by tall trees and wild flowers professed her love for nature. Richards opened a school of drama from which have emerged many famous names of Punjabi drama like Ishwar Chand Nanda, Dr. Harcharan Singh, Balwant Gargi and Gurcharan Singh.

Every year, in the month of March, Richards organised a week-long festival in which students and villagers enacted her plays in an open-air theatre constructed on her estate. Among the guests, Prithvi Raj Kapoor and Balraj Sahni were the most regular. Amongst her other friends who later settled near Woodland Estate were Prof Jai Dayal, painter Sobha Singh and Farida Bedi. Richards' plays were on social reform, displaying wide sympathy with the people's ways and traditions. She wrote scripts while many people came and helped with the production. She wrote newspaper articles and painted watercolours. Andretta thus became the hub of cultural and theatrical activities for a whole generation of artists. One among them was young Bhabesh Chandra Sanyal, who had already won recognition as a sculptor and painter and later on became the doyen of Indian art. He discusses Norah Richards at some length in his autobiography.

Richards' contribution to Punjabi drama was duly recognised by Punjabi University, Patiala, which awarded her an honorary doctorate. The museum of the university houses some of her rare belongings. During the later years of her life, Richards was deeply worried about the future of Woodlands and her large collection of literature and manuscripts.

Though sceptic about governmental control and administration, she offered the estate to the government of Himachal Pradesh, but received no response. Eventually, she left most of her estate and valuable collections to the care of Punjabi University, Patiala.

In the waning days of her life, she was dependent on her attendants for a meagre meal and glass of water. She was placed to rest on 3 March 1971. Her gravestone in Woodlands Retreat has these last words inscribed: "Rest Weary Heart – Thy work is Done."

== Sources ==
- Excerpts from B. C. Sanyal's, The Vertical Woman, National Gallery of Modern Art, New Delhi, 1998 and other internet sources. (Compiled by Vipan Kumar courtesy: My Himachal.)
