= Hassan Latif =

Pakistani film score composer (1916 - 1979)

- Born: 1916; Sahiwal, Punjab, British India
- Died: 9 November 1979 (aged 62–63); Lahore, Punjab, Pakistan
- Occupations: Music director of films and at Radio Pakistan, Lahore
- Years active: 1950 – 1975

Hassan Latif (1916 – 9 November 1979) was a Pakistani film and radio music director known for composing popular film songs like, "Ja apni hasraton pe aanson baha ke sou ja" (Film: Susral 1962) and "Gaadi ko chalana babu zara halkay halkay" (Film: Anokhi 1956). Latif composed a Naʽat for the film Noor-e-Islam (1957), "Shah-e-Madina Yathrib Ke Waali", that is still regarded as a classic.

== Early life and career ==
Hassan was born in 1916 in Sahiwal, Punjab, British India. When he was only 12 years old, he got associated with Patiala gharana's Ustad Ashiq Ali Khan's household. He would even run daily errands for that household as a boy. He was later asked to learn to play the harmonium and accompanied Ashiq Ali Khan for a short time. Then veteran film song writer D. N. Madhok encouraged him in Bombay, when he went there to try his luck to get into the Indian film industry in British India.

He started his career as a music director in Pakistan with an Urdu film "Judai" that was released in 1950. He composed only one song, Gaari ko chalana babu for the movie "Anokhi" (1956) that became very popular, while rest of the songs of the movie were composed by a visiting Indian musician Timar Barn. Hassan's first breakthrough was a religious-themed movie, Noor-e-Islam (1957). He composed an Urdu naat for the movie, "Shah-e-Madina Yathrib Ke Waali Saray Nabi Teray Dar Ke Sawaali" that is popular till date and is an often used nasheed for Mawlid observations. It was originally vocalized by Saleem Raza, but many other singers also sang it in the later decades.

Hassan composed a Punjabi chorus song for film producer Wali Sahib's movie, "Lukan Meeti" (1959), "Kokla chhupa ke jumeraat ayi jay" that became a favorite play song for kids in Punjab. It was sung by Zubaida Khanum and others in 1962, he gave music for an Urdu movie, Susral that eventually turned out to be the climax of his film career. The film was a musical hit with songs like, "Ja apni hasraton pe aanson baha ke sou ja" (Singer: Noor Jehan) and "Jis ne meray dil ko dard diya" (Singer: Mehdi Hassan).

Hassan composed 165 songs in 28 Urdu and Punjabi movies. His last film as a music director was "Balwant Kaur" that was filmed in 1975 but released 13 years later in 1988, many years after his own death in 1979.

== Popular compositions ==
- Gari Ko Chalana, Babu, Zara Halkay Halkay Halkay... (Film: Anokhi - 1956), Singer(s): Zubaida Khanum, Poet: Fayyaz Hashmi
- Shah-e-Madina (saw), Yasrib Kay Wali, Saray Nabi Teray Dar Ke Sawali.. (Film: Noor-e-Islam - 1957), Singer(s): Saleem Raza & others Poet: Naeem Hashmi
- Kokla Chhupa Kay Jumerat Ayi Jay, Jehra Murh Kay Takkay, Ohdi Shaamat Aai Jay... (Film: Lukkan Mitti - 1959), Singer(s): Zubaida Khanum & others Poet: Traditional Punjabi folk song
- Ae Puttar Hattan Te Nahin Wikday, Tuun Labhdi Phirrain Bazaar Kurray... A (Radio Pakistan, Lahore production during the Indo-Pakistani war of 1971, Poet: Sufi Ghulam Mustafa Tabassum, Singer: Noor Jehan
- Woh Mujh Sei Hue Hamkalam Allah Allah ... (A Radi Pakistan, Lahore production, Singer: Farida Khanum, Poet: Sufi Ghulam Mustafa Tabassum
- Jaa, Apni Hasraton Par, Ansoo Baha Kay So Ja... (Film: Susral - 1962), Singer(s): Noor Jehan, Poet: Munir Niazi
- Jis Nay Meray Dil Ko Dard Diya, Us Shakal Ko Main Nay Bhulaya Nahin... (Film: Susral - 1962), Singer(s): Mehdi Hassan, Poet: Munir Niazi
- Kabhi Muskara, Kabhi Jhoom Ja, Kabhi Aah Bhar Kay..... (Film: Susral - 1962), Singer(s): Ahmed Rushdi, Poet: Munir Niazi
- Kaisay Kaisay Log, Hamaray Jee Ko Jalanay Aa Jatay Hayn... (Film: Teray Shehar Mein - 1965), Singer(s): Mehdi Hassan, Poet: Munir Niazi
- Zindagi, Majboor Hay, Lachar Hay, Sans Lena Bhi Yahan Dushwar Hay... (Film: Barsat Main - 1962), Singer(s): Saleem Raza, Poet: Tanvir Naqvi
- Log Dekhen Na Tamasha, Meri Ruswai Ka...(Film: Maan, Bahu Aur Beta - 1966), Singer(s): Noor Jehan, Poet: Habib Jalib

== Death ==
Hassan Latif died on 9 November 1979, in Lahore, Pakistan.
