= Phulan Rani =

Indian painter

- Born: 1928 (age 97–98); Amritsar

Phulan Rani (born 1928) is an Indian painter.

== Early life and education ==
Phulan Rani was born in 1928 in Amritsar. She belonged to a well to do Sikh family. Her mother died when she was an infant. Her father, Dr Ram Singh was a doctor. She had an interest in fine arts, particularly for painting and dancing. “My life really began when I started painting at thirteen,” she writes. “I have wonderful memories of that period making pencil drawings on the margins of the school books, attempting to draw sketches of persons and things that interested me.” She did not receive any formal training in art, but her education is in Liberal Arts and Psychology.

== Personal life ==
Rani married S. Shamsher Singh in 1944. The couple ran the New Modern High School in Amritsar, and Phulan taught art as well. After her marriage when Rani made a painting, Kartar Singh Bumra awarded her a cash prize of Rs. 100 and also presented her a book. She was happily married and in the new atmosphere to which great Kerala poet, Maha Kavi Sankara G.Kurup, referred in one of his letters addressed to her as " your happy home where poetry and art lead a blissful wedded life."

== Career ==
Rani won the first prize in the Simla Fine Art Exhibition held in 1948, for water color painting " The Dancer", done in wash style. Again in 1953, in the Silver Jubilee Fine Arts Exhibition of the Indian Academy of Fine Arts, Amritsar, presided over by Dr. Rajendra Prasad, her well known work, "Twin Sisters Day and Night", received a gold medal and her two other exhibits " Memory and Moonlight" and " Wayside Rest" were acclaimed.

In 1955 she visited Kangra Valley and met Sobha Singh there. Phulan Rani used the "wash" technique for melting colors in her works. In the next five years she painted hundreds of landscapes depicting the charm of the valley and an exhibition of these works were organized at Amritsar in 1962 and it was inaugurated by the Speaker of Lok Sabha.

During her cultural trip to Europe in 1970 in connection with concerts entitled "Indian Ragas through Music and Painting" at the universities and cultural organizations, she organized exhibitions of her flower paintings; and to the British.

Rani also held solo exhibitions in different cities if India like Poona, Bombay, Kanpur, Ranchi, Calcutta and Chandigarh and won acclaim.

== Subject matter ==
Rani did a series of flower studies, landscape scenes and life drawings. She also did works on domestic genre, she devoted herself entirely to such lyrically themes as "The Bride", "The Heart Broken" and "The Afflicted."

During the birthday celebrations of Guru Gobind Singh she was commissioned by Guru Gobind SIngh Foundation, Patiala, to paint the whole life of Master in thirty paintings which she did in record time. Again during the Birth-day celebrations of Guru Nanak, in 1969, her pictorial biography of the great Guru won her an award of Rs. 1000/ from president Shri V.V.Giri. This book has been translated into English Braille. Her pictorial biography of Guru Tegh Bahadur, painted in the same strain, was selected for award by Punjab Govt. for being the best book of the year 1976-77.

Her other works include love legends such as "The Desert of Manju", "Sassi of the Sorrows", "Mirza Sahiban", and "The Lure of His Flute". Her created paintings among others "The Poet", "Time and Beauty", "The Poet and the Muses", "Megh Doot", and "The Great Singers".

Portraits of "Saint Ravidas", "Rishi Valmik" located at the Municipal Corporation Hall, Amritsar, "Guru Nanak" in Air India Office, San Francisco; "Guru Gobind Singh" in Sikh Temple, Manchester and "Galib" in the collection of N.S. Virdi.

She wrote on topics such as art, science, classics, morals and biographies. Two of her books, namely " Paudayan-da-jiwan (Life of Plants)", "Germ-ate-Asin (Germs and We)" have received state awards.

== Exhibitions ==
=== 1946 ===
Won first prize for “The Dancer” at exhibition in Shimla.

=== 1953 ===
Received gold medal at the Silver Jubilee exhibit of the Indian Academy of Fine Arts at Amritsar, for her painting “Twin Sisters: Day and Night.”

=== 1960-65 ===
Exhibition of landscapes at Amritsar. Exhibitions at Poona, Bombay and Kolkata. The Poona exhibit included 150 Kangra Valley paintings . These include “Waterfall near Bharvan,” “Waterfall at Andretta,” and “Road Through Rice Fields.”

== Bibliography ==
- Tampy, K. P. Padmanabhan., and Shamsher Singh. (1981)Visions of Beauty by Phulan Rani. Amritsar
- Kaur Singh.Nikky-Guninder (2011) - Sikhism : An Introduction. I.B.Tauris & Co Ltd. ISBN 978-1-84885-320-1 (HB)
- Singh, Nikky-Guninder Kaur. The Birth of the Khalsa: A Feminist Re-memory of Sikh Identity. Albany: State U of New York, 2005. Print.
- Parimoo, Ratan and Sarkar, Sandip (2009) - Historical Development of Contemporary Indian Art 1880-1947; Lalit Kala Akademi;New Delhi. ISBN 81-87507-35-7
