= Ishwar Chander Nanda =

Indian dramatist (1892–1965)

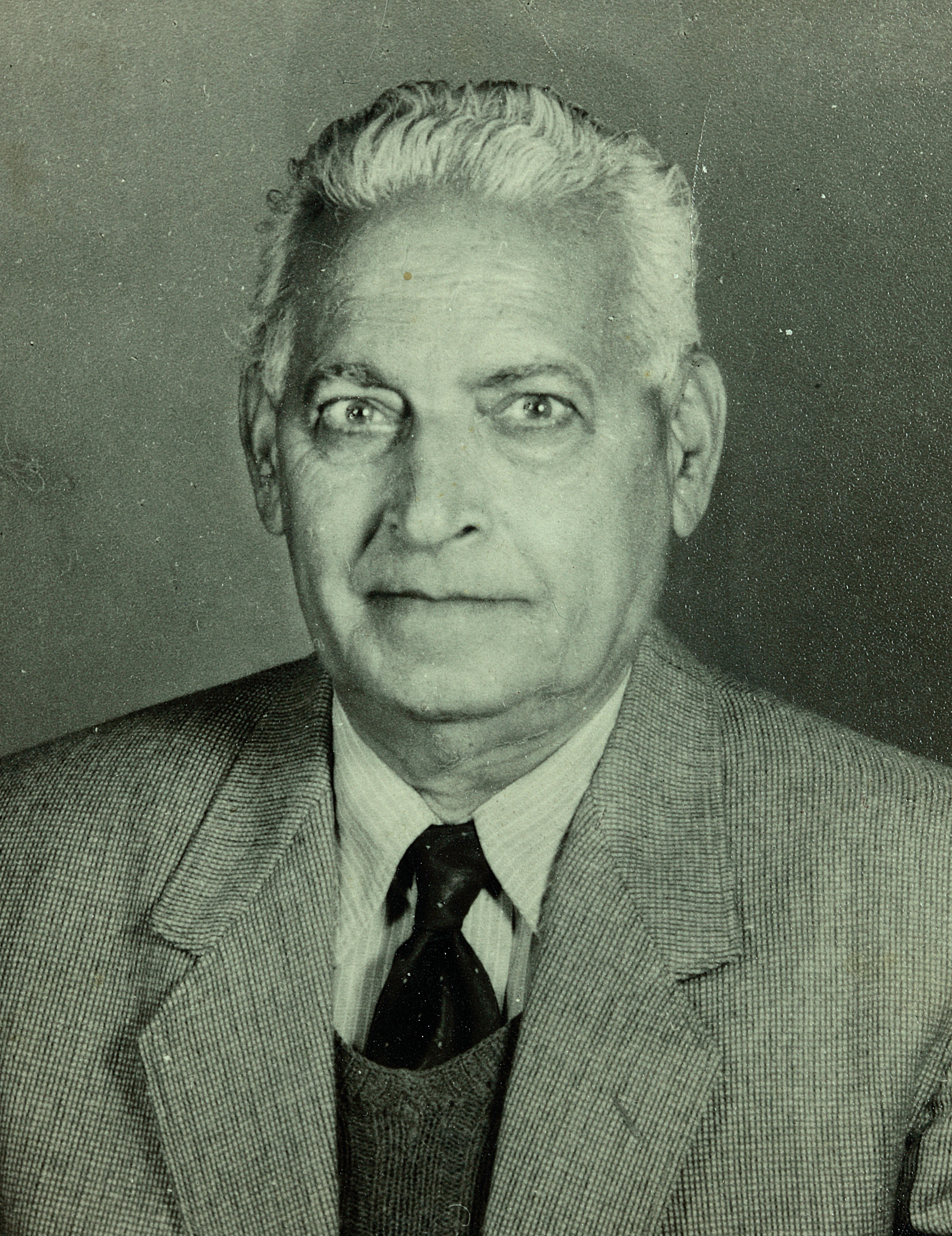
- Ishwar Chander Nanda in 1950s
- Born: 30 September 1892; Gurdaspur district, Punjab, India
- Died: 3 September 1965 (aged 72)

Ishwar Chand Nanda (30 September 1892 – 3 September 1965) was an Indian academic and dramatist, known as the father of Punjabi drama.

== Life ==
He did B.A. Honors from Dayal Singh College, Lahore, where he was a student of Norah Richards, and then M.A. English from Punjab University, Lahore. He later became professor at Dayal Singh College, where he worked till his retirement on 15 August 1947.

After the partition of India in 1947, he settled in New Delhi, where he lived for the rest of life.

== Plays ==
- Suhag or Dulhan (1913), one-act play
- Bebe Ram Bhajni (1914)
- Subhaddra (1920)
- Var Ghar or Lily Da Viah (1930)
- Shamu Shah (1928)
- Social Circle (1953), three one-act plays
