= Bodhraj (artist) =

Indian artist (1934–1992)

The Sikh artist Bodhraj (holding the calendar on the left), 1979

Bodhraj (1934–1992) was an Indian artist who created Sikh art. He worked under the patronage of the Punjab and Sind Bank to create artwork for their annual calendars containing Sikh artwork from the 1970s to 1990s. He designed the logo of the bank. Some of his works can be found in the Bhai Mati Das Museum and the Central Sikh Museum. Some of his works have since been sold at auction.

== Biography ==
Bodhraj was born in Lyallpur, Punjab, British India (now Pakistan) in 1934. He studied art at Hoshiarpur. Later, he operated a commercial studio in Delhi, mostly designing labels for medicine and cassettes. Starting with painting of landscapes, he eventually started creating portraits of the Sikh gurus and their associates. In 1972, he designed the Punjab and Sind Bank's current logo. He died in 1992. Twenty-three of his paintings are kept in the collection of the Bhai Mati Das Museum in Delhi. His sons Mohinder Bodhraj (died 2013) and Vijay also became artists and worked with Punjab and Sind Bank.

== Awards ==
- Lalit Kala Akademi (1982–83)
- First prize for best-produced book from the World Book Fair, New Delhi, 1988
- Punjabi Academy, Delhi (1991)
- Delhi Children's Book Trust (1992)

== List of paintings ==
List of paintings by Bodhraj
Name of painting	Description	Year of creation	References
A Gurmukh is Always Humble	Dattu (son of Guru Angad) kicking Guru Amar Das	1990	
Installation of Granth Sahib	Ād Granth being installed at Amritsar in 1604	1990	
Spreading the Message through Booklets	Guru Amar Das with his grandson Sansar Ram	Unknown	
