= Banuri =

Banuri may refer to:

- Banoori, a family name
- Banuri, Himachal Pradesh, a village in India

== See also ==
- Banur, town in Punjab, India
- Allama Banuri Town, a neighbourhood in Karachi, Pakistan
