= Mohinder Singh Randhawa =

Indian botanist, civil servant and historian (1909–1986)

M.S. Randhawa
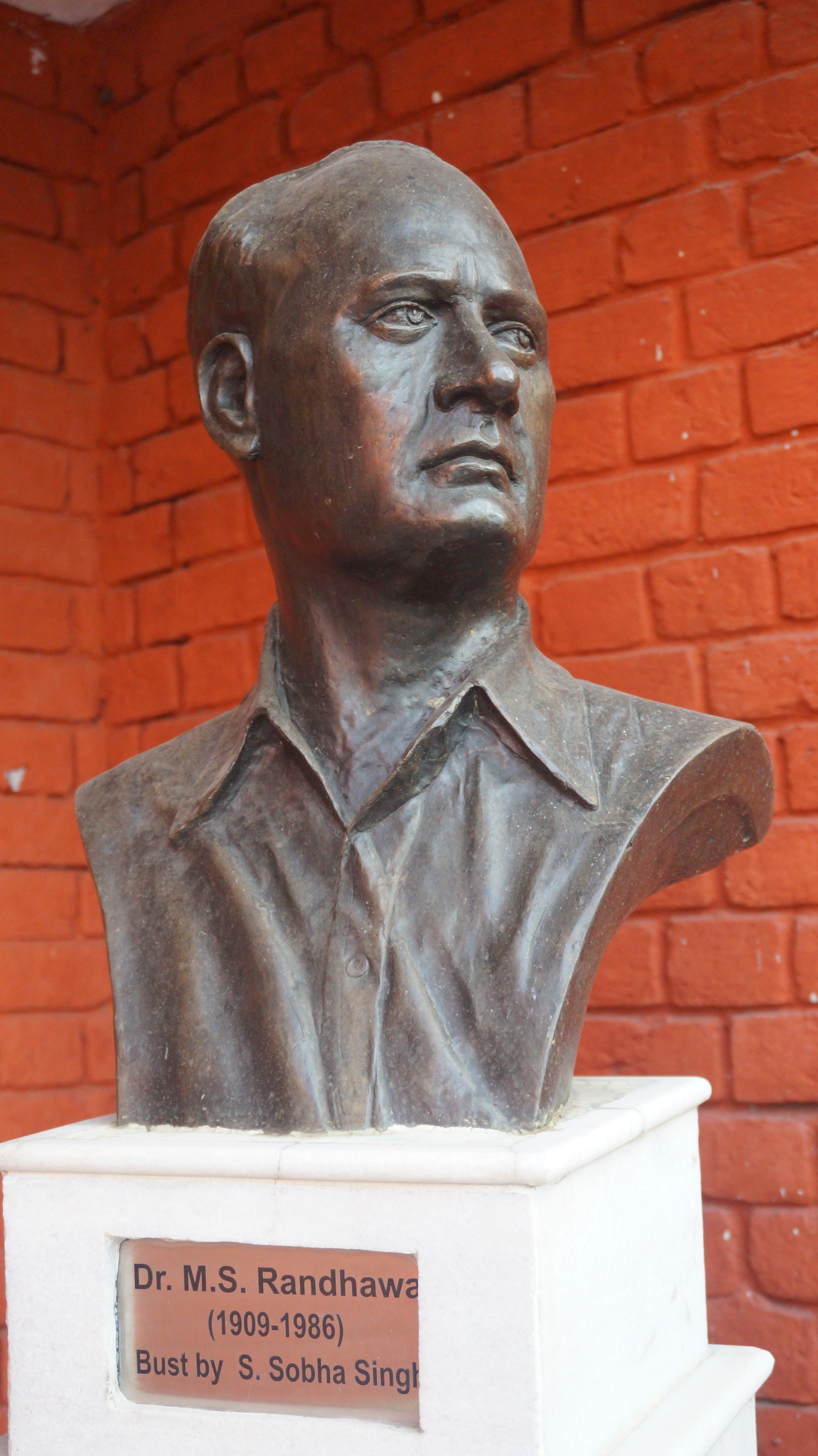
- Bust of Dr Randhawa at the Chandigarh rose garden
- Born: 2 February 1909; Zira, Punjab, India
- Died: 3 March 1986 (aged 77); Kharar, Punjab, India
- Education: University of the Punjab
- Occupations: Civil servant; Phycologist; director general of rehabilitation
- Spouse: Iqbal Kaur Randhawa
- Children: 1

Mohinder Singh Randhawa or M. S. Randhawa (2 February 1909 – 3 March 1986) was an Indian historian, civil servant, botanist, and author. He played major roles in the establishment of agricultural research in India, the Green Revolution in India, resettling Punjabis uprooted by the partition of India as the Director-General of Rehabilitation, establishing the city of Chandigarh, and documenting the arts of Punjab and the history of agriculture in India. A biographer, Gulzar Singh Sandhu, gave him the sobriquet Punjab da Chhewan Dariya, the sixth river of Punjab.

== Biography ==
=== Early life and education ===
Randhawa was born on 2 February 1909 into a Randhawa Jatt Sikh family at Zira, Ferozepur district, Punjab, India, to Sher Singh Randhawa and Bachint Kaur, who came from an affluent family belonging to the village Bodal (Garna sahib), Dasuya, Hoshiarpur district. He received his matriculate from Khalsa High School, Muktsar in 1924 and his F.Sc., BSc (Hons.), and MSc (Hons.) in 1926, 1929, and 1930, respectively, from Lahore. In 1955, he was awarded a Doctorate in Science by the University of the Punjab for his work on algae, especially on the Zygnemataceae.

=== Career ===
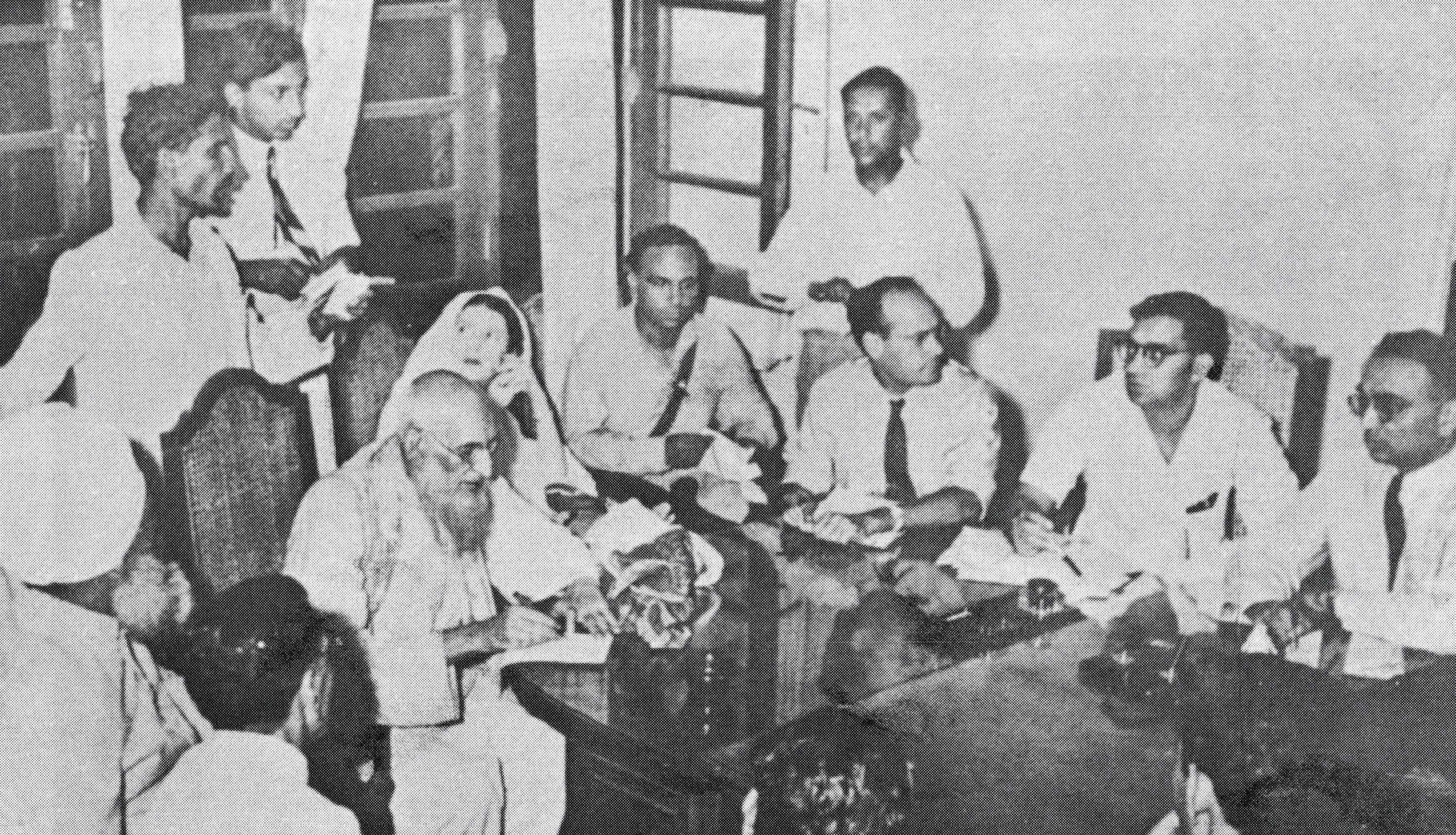
M S Randhawa, part of the Emergency Committee Control Room, Delhi, September 1947.

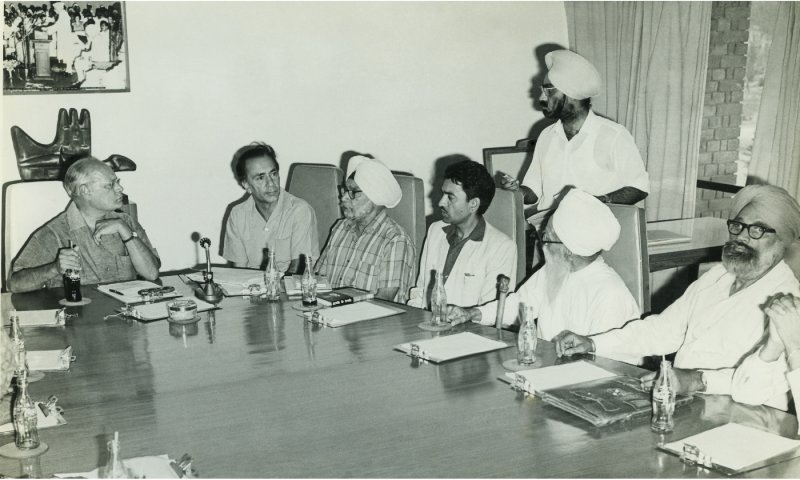
M S Randhawa with Punjabi Writers and academics, 1970

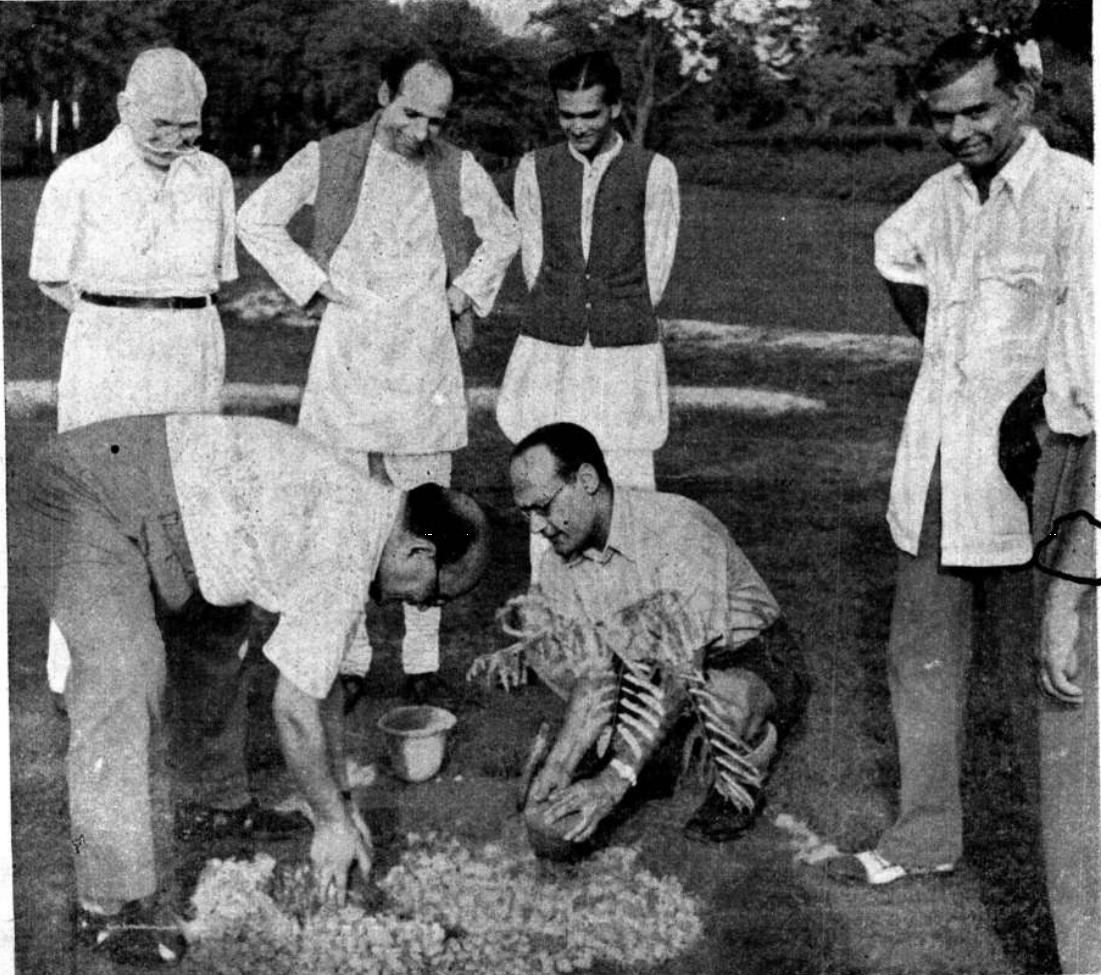
Randhawa planting tree in Chandigarh

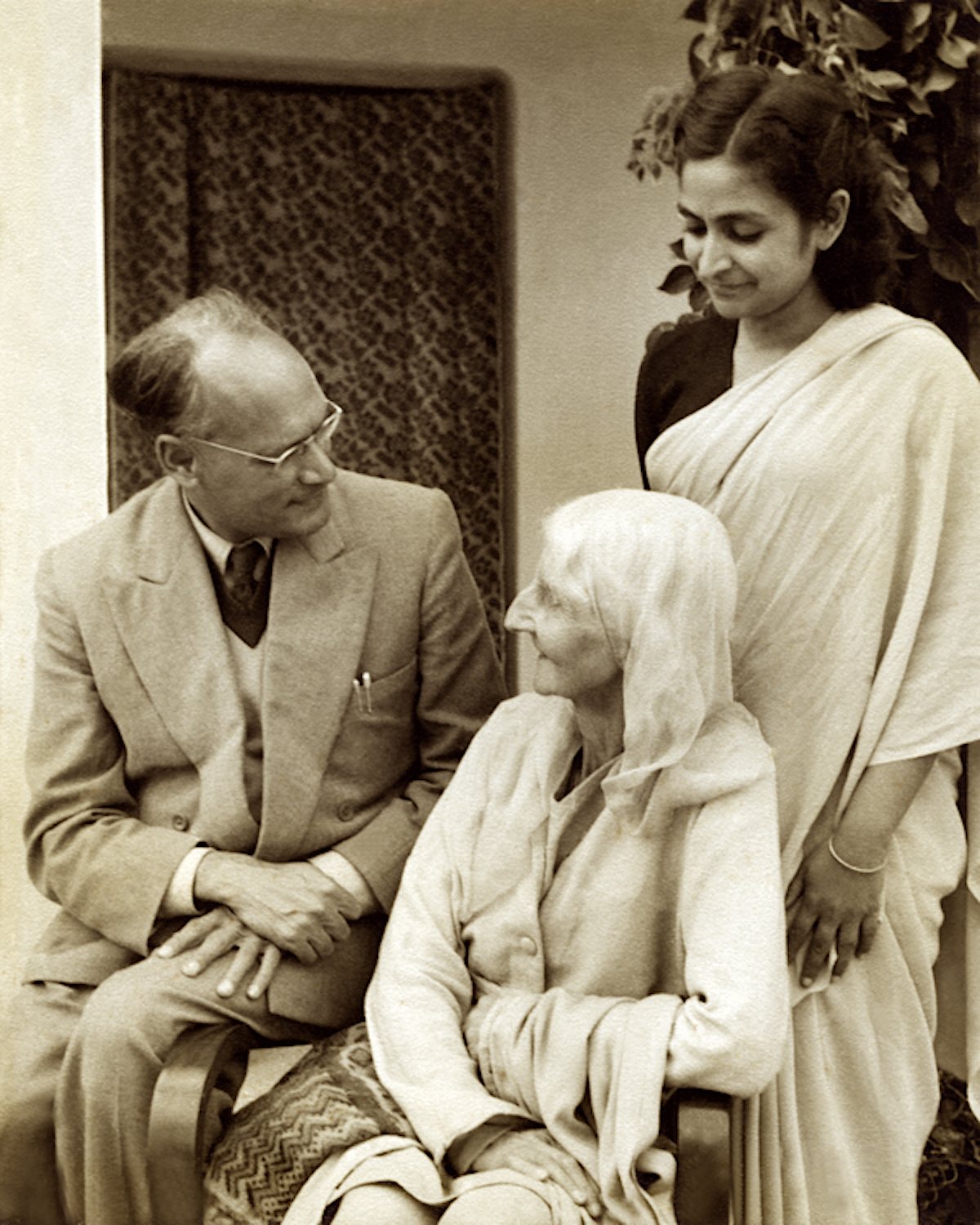
M. S. Randhawa, Norah Richards and Amrita Pritam at Andretta, Himachal Pradesh, c. 1960

Randhawa joined the Indian Civil Service in 1934, then served in various capacities at Saharanpur, Fyzabad, Almora, Allahabad, Agra, and Rai Bareli until 1945, when he became secretary of the Indian Council of Agricultural Research (ICAR) for a year. He was associated with the ICAR through its initial years and made huge contributions to this pioneering organisation which was responsible for the Green Revolution in India.

In 1946, he was appointed as the deputy commissioner of Delhi, when India was on the eve of independence. In 1947 he was in charge of the entire function where Jawaharlal Nehru delivered his famous Tryst with destiny speech. As deputy commissioner, he helped persons uprooted by the Partition of India resettle, and then in 1949 he was sent as the additional director-general (rehabilitation) and subsequently made the director-general (rehabilitation), Punjab. Randhawa then went to Ambala Division in the Punjab as the commissioner. He was brought back to the task of rehabilitating people in 1953 as the development commissioner and commissioner rehabilitation and custodian, evacuee property, Punjab. During this time he was in charge of allotting land to those who had left behind lands in Pakistan and allotting land to them in Indian Punjab.

In 1955 he was made the vice-president of the Indian Council of Agricultural Research (ICAR) and additional secretary to Government of India, Ministry of Food and Agriculture, New Delhi. He then served the Government of India as advisor, Natural Resources Planning Commission from 1961 to 1964 and as the special secretary, Ministry of Food and Agriculture, Govt. of India. He subsequently became the financial commissioner of the Capital Project Punjab from July 1966 to October 1966, and then he was appointed the chief commissioner of the Union Territory of Chandigarh in November 1966 and remained so till 1968. Dr. Randhawa served as the founding vice-chancellor of Punjab Agricultural University in the 1970s.

Randhawa was a key promoter of tree planting and was behind what became the establishment of the national tree planting week known as Van Mahotsav.

Randhawa was chairman of the committee to plan the city of Chandigarh in 1955, and was instrumental in its landscaping. He was instrumental in the establishment of the Chandigarh Museum, Punjab Arts Council and Museum of Cultural Heritage of Punjab at Ludhiana. He also introduced many species of avenue trees to Chandigarh and founded the Rose Garden in Sector 16 in Chandigarh, the Punjab Agricultural University at Ludhiana, the Government Museum and Art Gallery, Chandigarh, and the Anglo Sikh War Memorial near Ferozepur which was completed in February 1976.

=== Death and legacy ===
Dr. Randhawa died on 3 March 1986 in his farmhouse in Kharar near Chandigarh. The library at Punjab Agricultural University is named in his honour and maintains a collection of his works and laboratory instruments used by him. At-least two Sikh artists were inspired by M. S. Randhawa, including Kirpal Singh and Mehar Singh.

== Published works ==
Randhawa was a prolific writer. Apart from numerous papers on algae, he published many books on art, history, culture and agriculture. An autobiography in Punjabi Aap Biti was published in 1985.

- The Birth of the Himalayas (1947)
- Beautifying India (1950)
- Out of the Ashes; an account of the rehabilitation of refugees from West Pakistan in rural areas of East Punjab (1954)
- Flowering Trees (1957)
- Agricultural Research In India (1958)
- Basohli Painting (1959)
- Zygnemaceae (ICAR Monographs on Algae) (1959)
- Farmers of India with Prem Nath (1959)
- Indian Painting : the scene, themes, and legends with John Kenneth Galbraith (Hamilton, 1961)
- Beautiful Trees and Gardens (1961)
- Kangra Paintings on Love (1962)
- Agriulture And Animal Husbandry In India (1962)
- Natural Resources of India (1963)
- Chamba Painting (1967)
- Travels In The Western Himalayas (1967)
- Evolution of Life (1969)
- The Kumaon Himalayas (1970)
- Kangra rāgamālā paintings (1971)
- Beautiful Gardens (1971)
- The Famous Gardens of India (1971)
- Kangra Valley Painting (1972)
- Green Revolution (1973)
- Travels in the western Himalayas in search of paintings (1974)
- Gardens through the ages (1976)
- A history of the Indian Council of Agricultural Research, 1929–1979 (1979)
- Kishangarh Painting (1980)
- Punjab (Punjabi edition, 1980)
- A History of Agriculture in India volume 1 2 3 4 (1980–1986)
- Basohli Paintings of the Rasamanjari (1981)
- Guler Painting (1982)
- Paintings of the Bābur nāmā (1983)
- Indian sculpture : the scene, themes, and legends (1985)
- Indian paintings : exploration, research, and publications (1986)

== Gallery ==
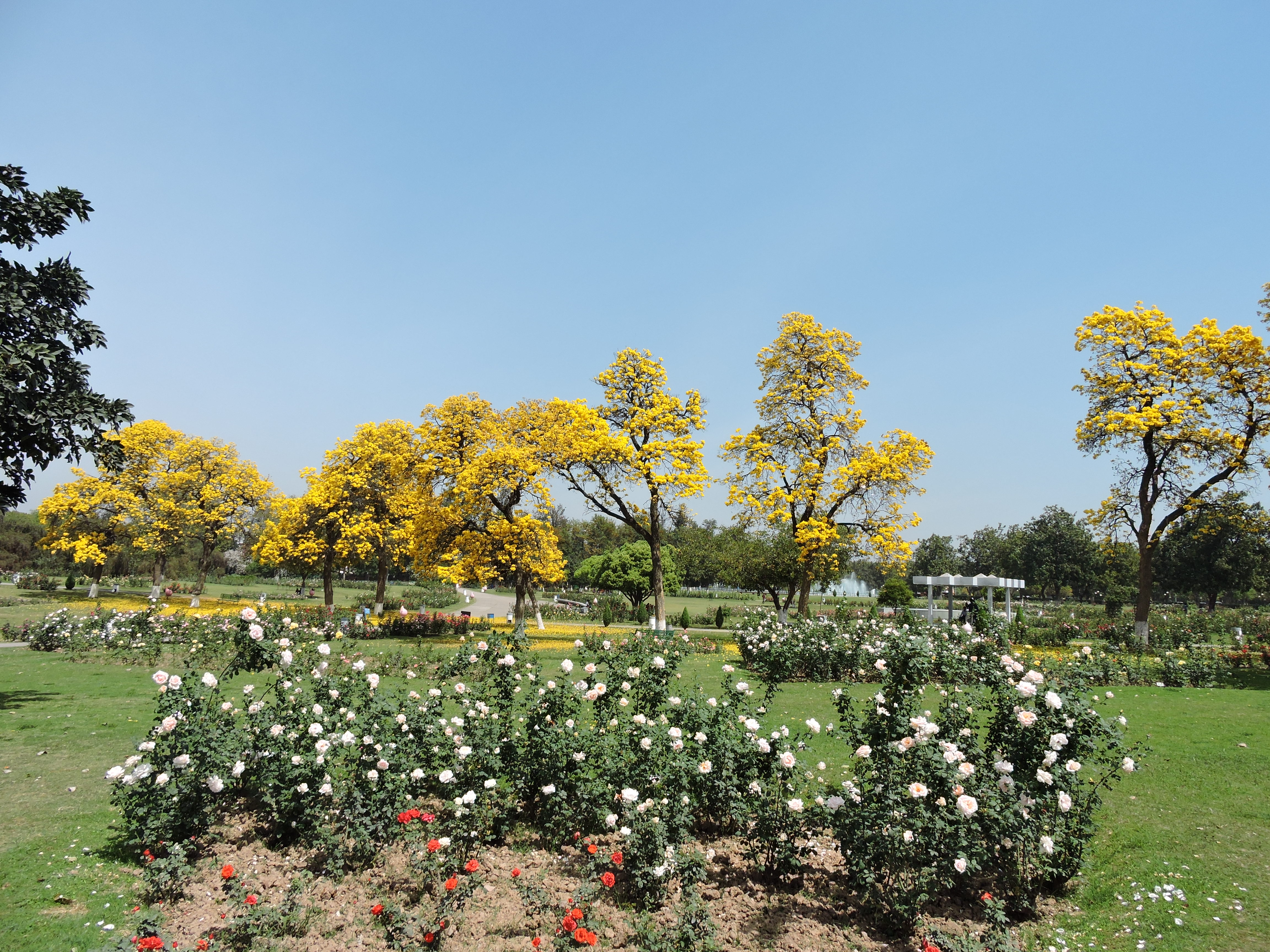
Roses Garden Chandigarh.

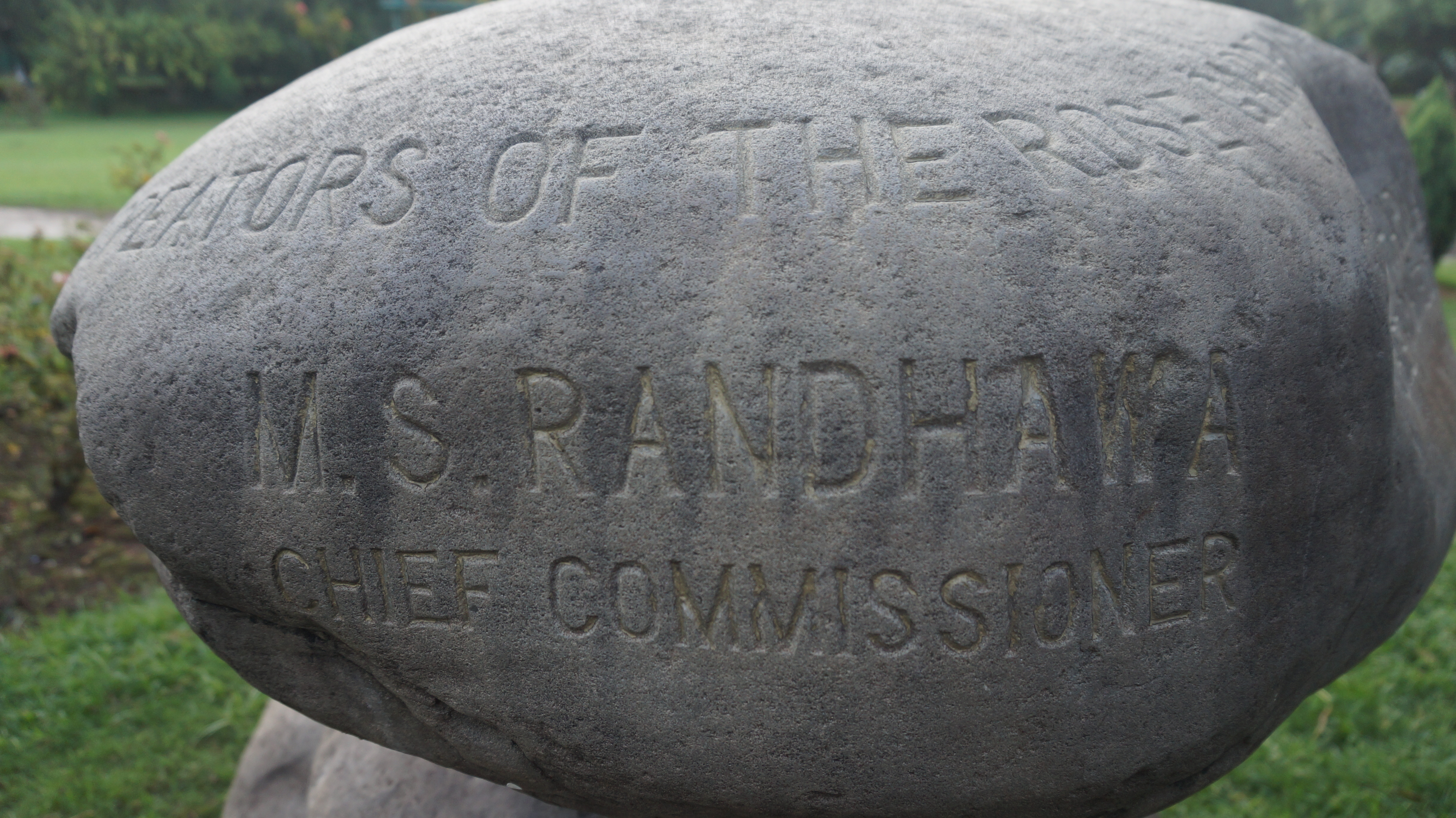
Tribute to the founder including Dr Randhawa

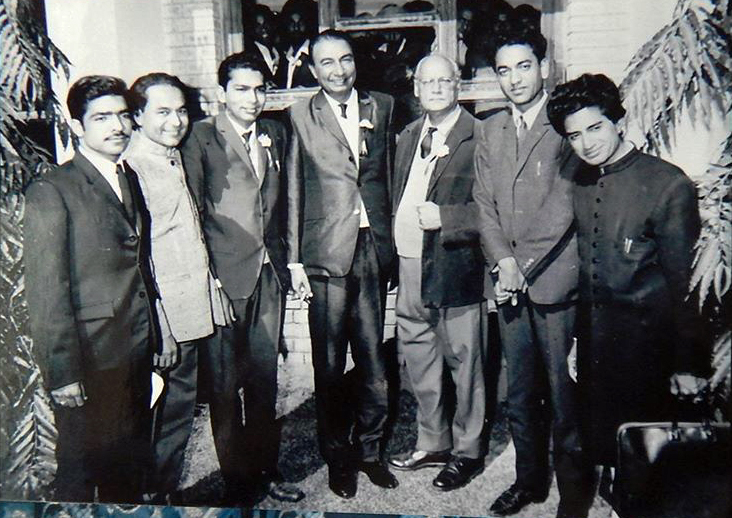
Randhawa with poets from Punjab including Sahir Ludhianvi, Shiv Kumar Batalvi, Ludhiana, 1970

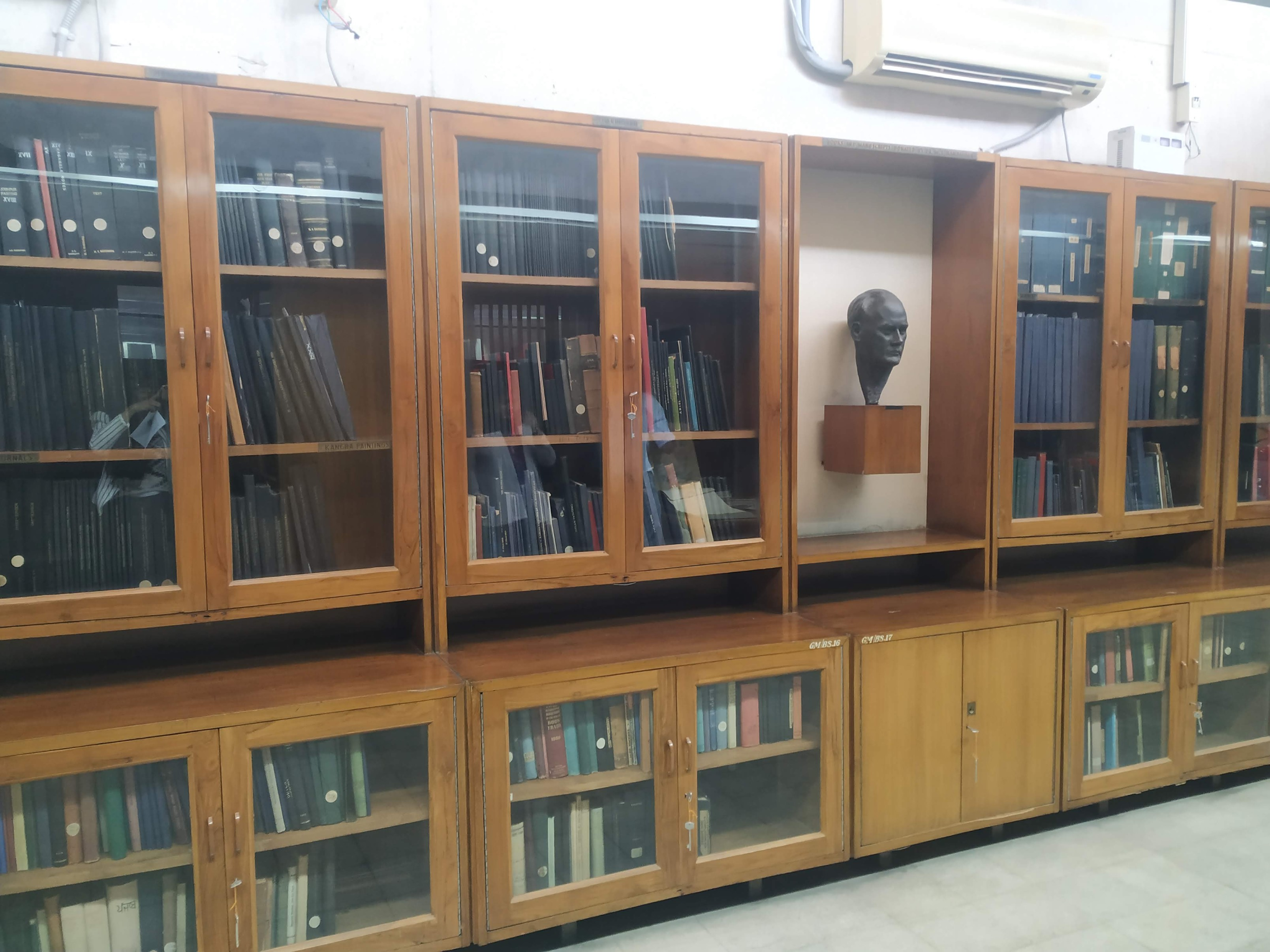
:Mohinder Singh Randhawa & Corbusier Collection at Chandigarh Government Archive.

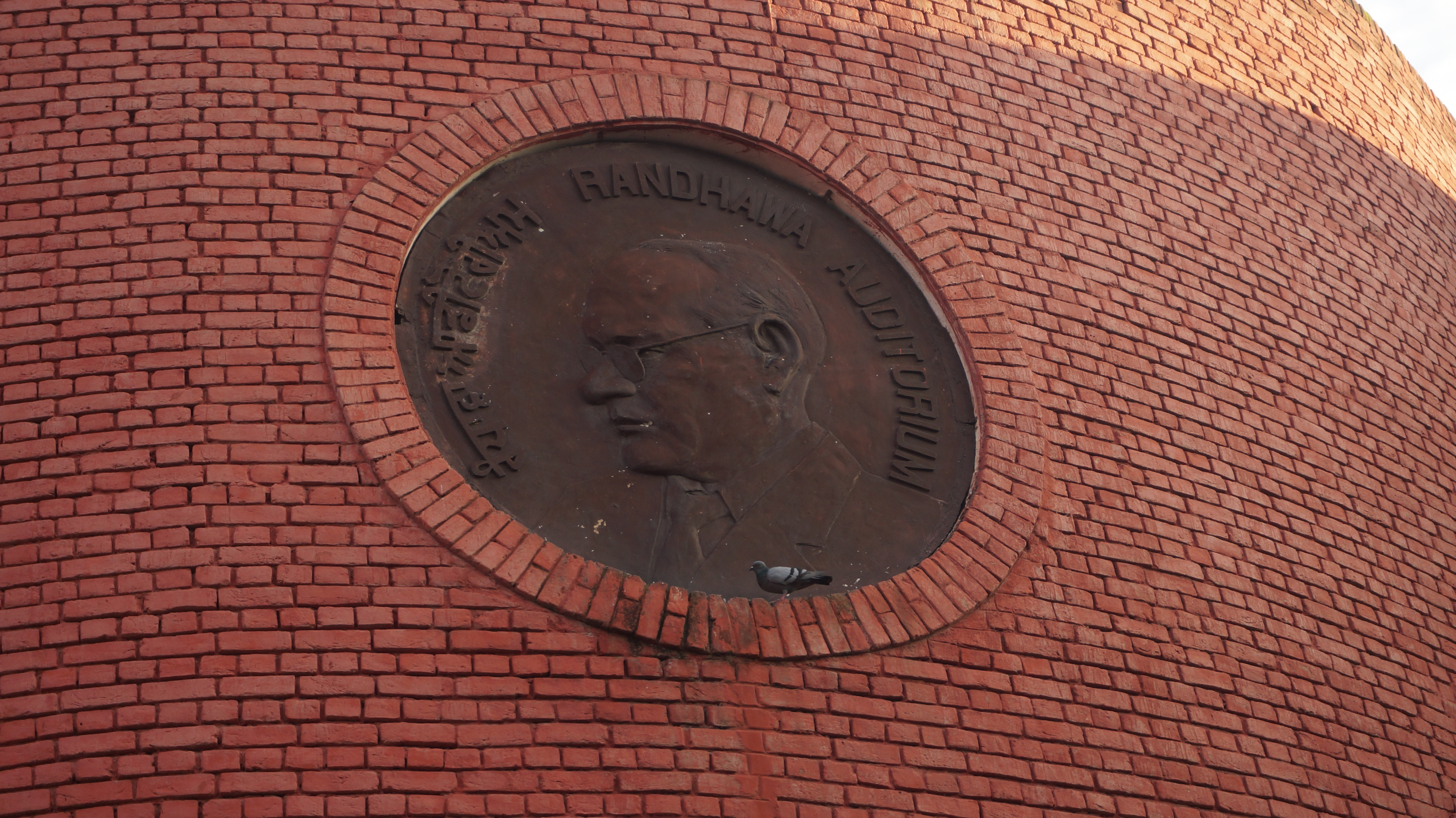
A plaque for Dr Randhawa

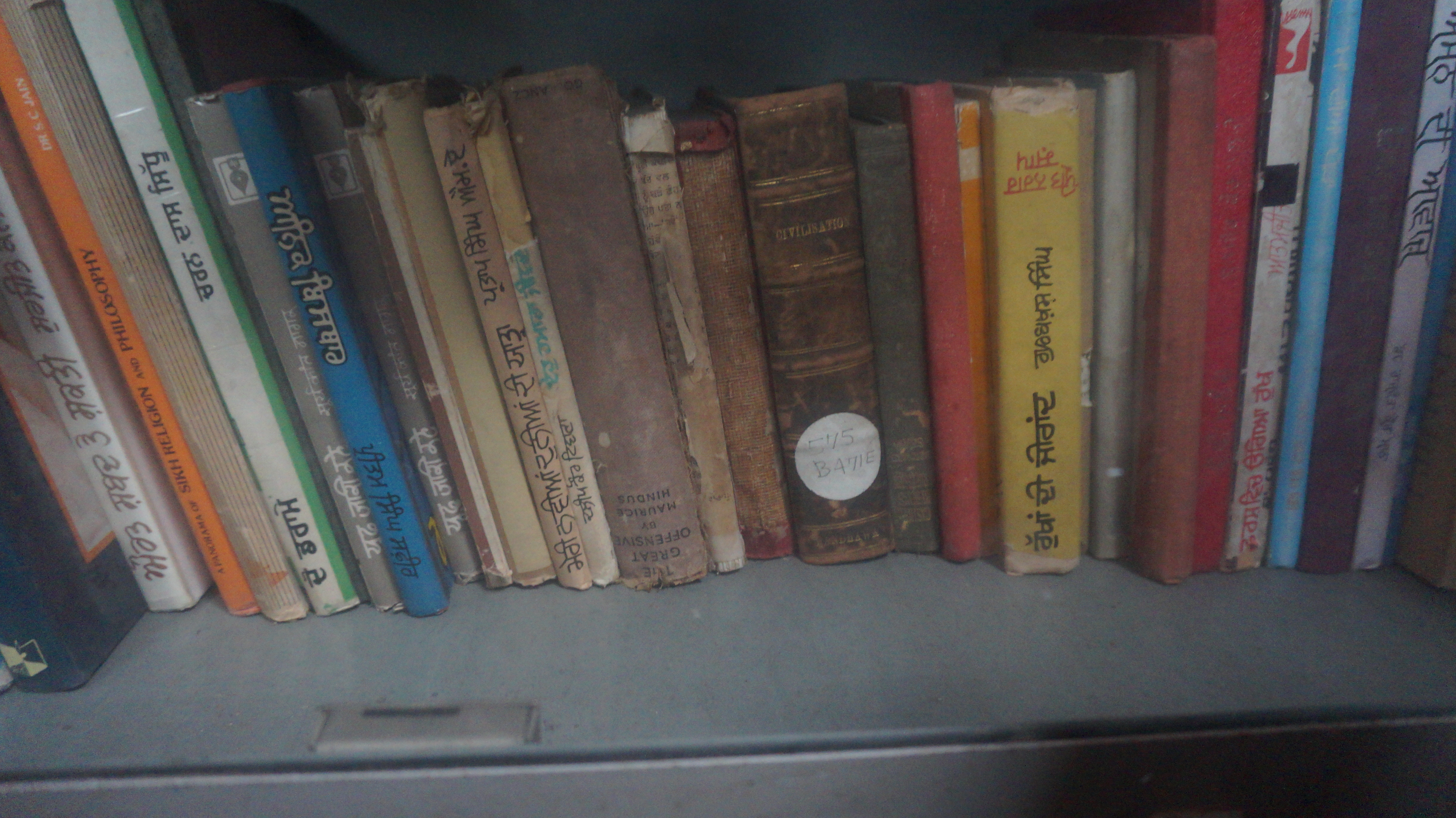
Books, probably belonging to Dr Randhawa, at the book cafe
