= Punjab & Sind Bank =

Indian public sector bank

- Type: Public
- Traded as: BSE: 533295; NSE: PSB
- Industry: Banking; Financial services
- Founded: 24 June 1908; 118 years ago
- Headquarters: Rajendra Place, New Delhi, India
- Key people: Charan Singh (Non-Exe Chairman); Swarup Kumar Saha (MD & CEO)
- Products: Consumer banking, corporate banking, finance and insurance, investment banking, mortgage loans, wealth management
- Revenue: ▲₹13,049 crore (US$1.4 billion)(2025)
- Operating income: ▼₹1,130.94 crore (US$120 million) (2024)
- Net income: ▼₹1,017 crore (US$110 million) (2025)
- Total assets: ▲₹161,815.17 crore (US$17 billion) (2025)
- Owner: Government of India (93.85%)
- Number of employees: 10,229
- Capital ratio: 17.16% (2024)
- Website: punjabandsind.bank.in

Punjab & Sind Bank is an Indian public sector bank headquartered in New Delhi. As of 30 June 2025, the bank has 1817 branches, which are widely spread across India. The largest number of branches are in the state of Punjab - 635 branches. The bank has 25 zonal offices, which are located all over India.

== History ==
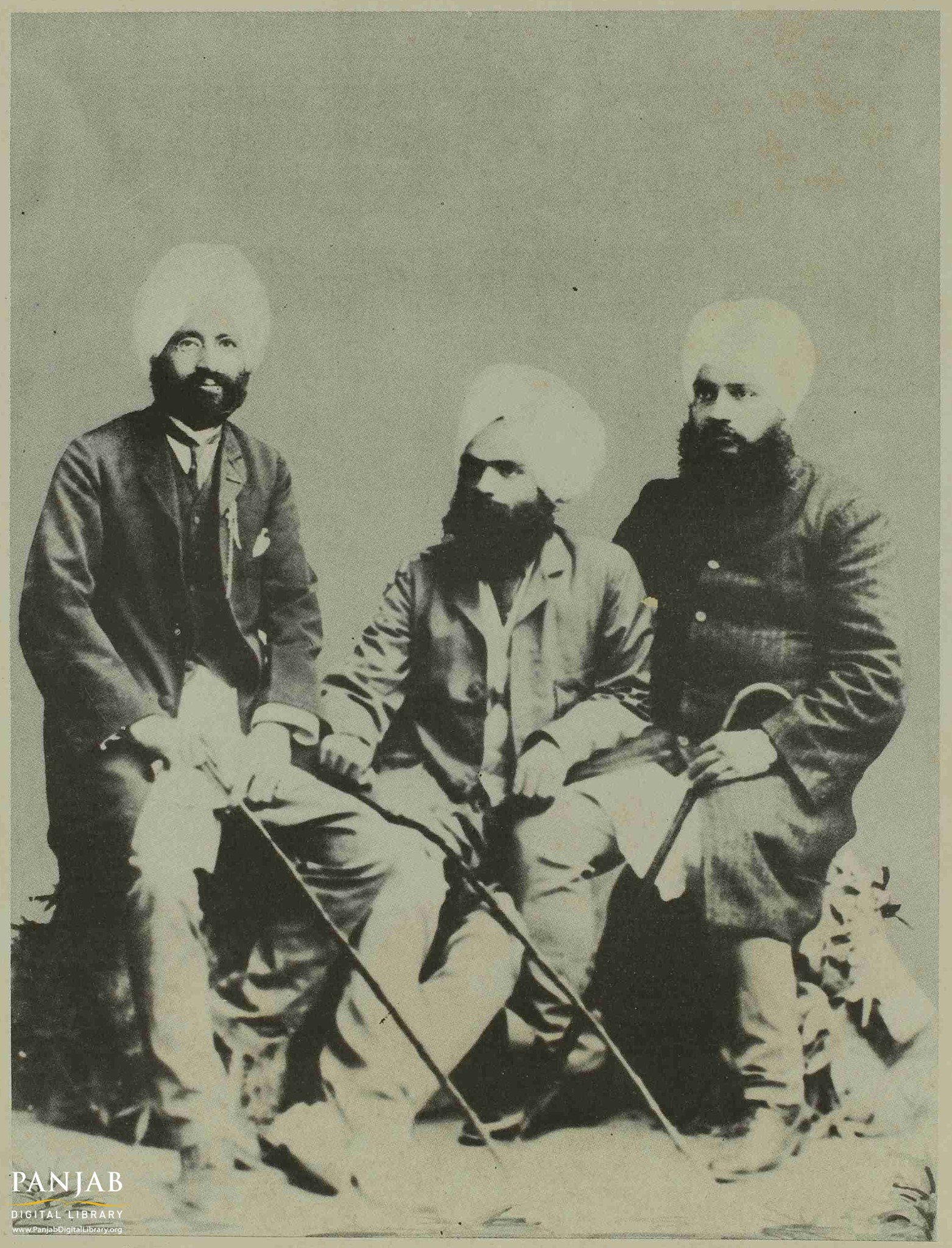
Punjab & Sind Bank founders group portrait. From left-to-right: Tarlochan Singh, Vir Singh, Sundar Singh Majithia, 1907

The first branch of the bank in Amritsar was established on 24 June 1908 by Sikh reformers of the Singh Sabha movement, namely Bhai Vir Singh, Sir Sunder Singh Majitha, and Sardar Tarlochan Singh, to serve the then Sind and Punjab areas of colonial India. The bank was established as a bank "by the Sikhs, for the Sikhs". The bank initially was going to be named The Punjab Union Bank Ltd but it ended being incorporated as The Punjab & Sind Bank Limited to accommodate the Punjabi population living in Sindh. It opened on 24 June 1908 at Hall Bazaar, Amritsar with an akhand path and ardas prayer by Mohan Singh, with 10,000 rupees being collected for the bank on its first opening. Majithia was the chairman for the Board of Directors, Trilochan Singh was the managing director, and the other directors were Vir Singh, Dharam Singh, Mahindar Singh, Harkishan Lal, Mehr Singh Chawla, Baghail Singh, and Shivdev Singh. Two other branches were opened shortly after, namely at Gujranwala (August 1908) and Rawalpindi (October 1908).

By 1947, the bank had eleven branches at Amritsar, Lahore, Lyallpur, Gujranwala, Rawalpindi City, Rawalpindi Cantt, Sialkot and Ludhiana, with sub-offices in Jaranwala, Lahore City and Gojra. However, the 1947 partition of India led to it losing many of its locations in the newly-formed Pakistan, leaving it with two branches remaining in independent India. The following period of the bank was under Balbir Singh (brother of Vir Singh) as its managing director from January 1947 to October 1974. The following year it eight branches after opening new locations and thirteen branches by 1954. In 1960, Inderjit Singh joined the bank, becoming chairman in 1968, and managing director between 1980 and 1981. Inderjit Singh's tenure was a period of expansion for the bank, as they had opened 546 new branches between 1968 and 1981. Inderjit Singh introduced a lot of programs in the bank related to Sikh history as he wished to promote Sikh teachings and considered the bank to be "only banking institution for the Sikhs in the country".

In the 1960s, Punjab & Sind Bank established a branch in London. The logo of the bank was designed by the artist Bodhraj in 1972. In 1974, it published its first annual calendar on Sikh history. On 15 April 1980, Punjab & Sind Bank was among six banks that the Government of India nationalised in the second wave of nationalisation (the first wave had been in 1969 when the government nationalised the top 14 banks). In 1991 Bank of Baroda acquired Punjab & Sind Bank's London branch at the behest of the Reserve Bank of India following Punjab & Sind's involvement in the Sethia fraud in 1987.

Since 2004, the bank has shown growth of over 40% year on year, and its IPO was oversubscribed by more than 50 times.

On 16 July 2019, Punjab & Sind Bank disclosed that it detected a fraud, worth ₹238 crore (US$25 million) by the Bhushan Power & Steel Limited.

== Products ==
- Aadhaar Pay
- ATM
- BharatQR
- BHIM
- Debit card
- Internet Banking
- Mobile Banking
- POS Machine
- SMS Banking
- UPI

== Financial performance ==
#	Particulars	FY 2016–17	FY 2017–18	FY 2018–19	FY 2019–20	FY 2020-21
A	Deposits (' INR crores)	85,540.16	1,01,726.17	98,557.60	89,667.55	96,108.18
B	Advances (' INR crores)	60,263.09	69,738.78	72,747.47	62,564.20	67,811.00
C	Total Business (A+B) (' INR crores)	1,45,803.25	1,71,464.95	1,71,305.07	1,52,231.75	1,63,919.18
D	Total Assets (' INR crores)	97,753.40	1,11,591.84	1,06,973.01		1,10,481.89
E	Operating Profit (' INR crores)	1241.88	1144.71	1396.86	1096.91	771.22
F	Net Profit(' INR crores)	201.08	(-743.80)	(-543.48)	(-990.80)	(-2732.90)
G	Net Interest Margin (NIM) (%)	2.16		1.98	1.88	2.11
H	Return on assets (%)	0.20	(-0.69)	(-0.47)	(-0.91)	(-2.55)
I	Gross NPAs (%)	10.45	11.19	11.83	14.18	13.76
J	Net NPAs (%)	7.51	6.93	7.22	8.03	4.04
K	Total Branches	1500	1514	1518	1526	1531
L	Total ATM's	1400	1400+	1500+	1500+	1450+

In FY 2019-20 Punjab & Sind Bank recorded a Net Loss of Rs.990.80 crore.

- Total business of the bank stood at Rs. 1,52,231.75 crore.
- The operating profit for the year ending 2019-20 is Rs. 1097 crores.
- Gross NPA is 14.18% for the year ending 2019-20 amounting to Rs 8875 crores.
- Net NPA is 8.03% for the year ending 2019-20 amounting to Rs 4684 crores.
- Provision Coverage Ratio as on 31 March 2020 stood at 66.74%.
- The Net Worth of the bank stood at Rs. 2917 crore as on 31.03.2020.
- Total Income of the bank during the year stood at Rs 8827 crore.

The Capital Adequacy Ratio (Basel III) of the Bank is 12.76% as on 31.03.2020.

== Patronage of Sikh art ==
In independent India, bodies commissioning new Sikh artwork tended to be Sikh museums (with their resident artist), private organisations (chiefly P&S Bank), and the government. These three sources of Sikh art patronage frequently overlapped with one another due to individuals being involved in more than one source, thus are described as "intersecting threads of patronage" by Kanika Singh. Beginning in 1974 under the guise of Inderjit Singh, Makhan Singh, and Satbir Singh, the Punjab & Sind Bank hired artists to create artwork based on Sikh heritage for its annually published illustrated calendar. Some of the artists hired to create artwork for the bank's calendar included Devender Singh, Mehar Singh, Bodhraj, Kirpal Singh, Rahi Mohinder Singh, Jarnail Singh, and Amolak Singh. These paintings were created to promote the teachings of the Sikh gurus and inform the younger generations. Sometimes a calendar issue and its associated artwork was dedicated to a specific topic, such as the 1975 issue covering historical Sikh women while the 1976 issue was based on kirtaniyas, specifically historical Sikh musicians. Sometimes a historical event from Sikh history was first-ever depicted in the P&D Bank's calendar art. In 1980, the formerly private bank was nationalised by the government of India but it continued to publish illustrated Sikh calendar artwork with commissioned works until the early 2000s, after which paintings in its calendars were replaced with photographs. The artwork created for the bank's calendar was later donated on the initiative of Harbans Singh to the Bhai Mati Das Museum in New Delhi. The 2023 version of the Punjab and Sind Bank website included an archive of its Sikh history calendars for between the years 2002–2018.

== Governance ==
As of 2026, the bank's Board of Directors includes:

- Swarup Kumar Saha - Managing Director & Chief Executive Officer
- Ravi Mehra - Executive Director
- Rajeeva - Executive Director
- Jitendra Asati - Government Nominee Director
- Vivek Srivastava - Nominee Director - RBI
- Rajendra Prasad Gupta - Shareholders Director
- Shankar Lal Agarwal - Part Time Non-Official Director

== See also ==
- Banking in India
- List of banks in India
- List of companies of India
- Punjab National Bank
- Reserve Bank of India
- Indian Financial System Code
- List of largest banks
