= Munir Niazi =

Pakistani poet (1923–2006)

Munir Niazi منیر نیازی
- Born: Munir Niazi; 9 April 1923; Hoshiarpur, Punjab, British India (present-day Punjab, India)
- Died: 26 December 2006 (aged 83); Lahore, Punjab, Pakistan
- Education: Govt. Sadiq Egerton College Bahawalpur; Dayal Singh College, Lahore
- Occupation: Poet
- Writing career
- Period: 1960 - 2006 (active years)
- Notable awards: Sitara-e-Imtiaz (Star of Excellence) Award by the Government of Pakistan (2005); Pride of Performance Award by the President of Pakistan (1992)

Munir Niazi (Punjabi, Urdu: منیر نیازی; 09 April 1923 – 26 December 2006), was a Pakistani poet. He mostly wrote in the Punjabi and Urdu languages and also wrote for newspapers, magazines and radio.

In 1960, he established a publication institute, Al-Misal. He was later associated with Pakistan Television, Lahore and lived in Lahore till his death.

== Early life and career ==
Munir Niazi was born on 09 April 1923 in Hoshiarpur district, Punjab, British India to a Punjabi-speaking family of Niazi Pathans. He was initially educated at Khanpur, Hoshiarpur district. After the partition of India in 1947, his family migrated and settled in Sahiwal, where he passed his matriculation examination. He also met the noted poet Majeed Amjad there who later became his mentor and friend. He earned an intermediate degree from Govt. Sadiq Egerton College, Bahawalpur and a B.A. degree from Dayal Singh College, Lahore.

Munir Niazi launched a weekly, Seven Colours, from Sahiwal in 1949. Some of his poetry was used in films and these film songs became popular super-hits among the Pakistani public which established him as one of the foremost lyricists in Pakistani films in the 1960s, penning numerous famous songs, such as Uss Bewafa Ka Shehar Hai Aur Hum Hain Dosto for Shaheed (1962).

== Popular poetry ==
| Film song | Singers | Song lyrics by | Music by | Film and year |
|---|---|---|---|---|
| "Jis Ne Mere Dil Ko Dard Diya" | Mehdi Hassan | Munir Niazi | Hasan Latif Lilak | Susral (1962) |
| "Jaa Apni Hasraton Pe Aansoo Baha Ke Sau Jaa" | Noor Jehan | Munir Niazi | Hasan Latif Lilak | Susral (1962) |
| "Uss Bewafa Ka Shehar Hai Aur Hum Hain Dosto" | Naseem Begum | Munir Niazi | Rashid Attre | Shaheed (1962) |
| "Kaisay Kaisay Loag Hamare Jee Ko Jalanay Aa Jaatain Hain" | Mehdi Hassan | Munir Niazi | Hasan Latif Lilak | Tere Shehar Mein (1965) |
| "Zinda Rahein Tau Kaya Hai Jau Mar Jaaen Hum Tau Kaya" | Naheed Akhtar | Munir Niazi | M Ashraf | Kharidar (1976) |

== Bibliography ==
Below are some of his Urdu publications:

- Taiz Hawa Aur Tanha Phool
- Jungle Mein Dhanak
- Dushmanoon Kai Darmiyan Sham
- Mah-e-Munir
- Kulyat e Munir
- Jungal Ma Dahanak
- Aik Lamha Taiz Safar Ka

In Punjabi language, he has published:

- Safar Di Raat
- Char Chup Cheezan
- Rasta Dassan Walay Tarey
- Che Rage Arwaze

Effective imagery in his poetry conveys pictures in a few words. He had experimented with poetic forms and had tried to create a new style, rhythm and diction in Urdu poetry. Innocence, mythology, nostalgia, dreams, eroticism, and romance are some of his most common themes. Selected English translations of Munir Niazi's poetic works were edited by Suhail Safdar and published in 1996.

== Death and legacy ==
Munir Niazi died of respiratory illness on 26 December 2006 in Lahore, Pakistan.

On his 86th birth anniversary, a book titled 'Munir Niazi Ki Baatain, Yadain' was launched to honor him at the Punjab Institute of Language, Art and Culture (Pilac) at Lahore, Pakistan. This book has interviews of the late Munir Niazi and opinion columns about him.

== Awards and recognition ==
- Pride of Performance Award by the President of Pakistan in 1992
- Sitara-e-Imtiaz (Star of Excellence) Award by the President of Pakistan in 2005
- Kamal-e-Fun Award (Lifetime achievement award) by the Pakistan Academy of Letters, a Government of Pakistan literary organization in 2002.

== A short poem of Munir Niazi ==
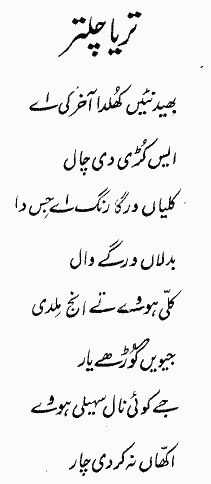
