= Inderjit Singh (banker) =

Sikh banker (November 1911 – 4 October 1998)

- Photograph of the banker Inderjit Singh
- Born: November , 1911; Musakhel, Punjab, British Raj
- Died: October 4, 1998 (aged 86)
- Occupation: Banker
- Known for: Patron of Sikh artwork while managing director for the Punjab & Sind Bank

Inderjit Singh (November 1911 – 4 October 1998) was a Sikh banker who served as the chairman and managing director for the Punjab & Sind Bank from the 1960s–80s. During his time at the bank, he was a patron of Sikh artwork, with paintings being commissioned and reproduced in an annual, illustrated calendar covering Sikh history. He was the founder of the Bank of Punjab (BOP).

== Early life and education ==
Inderjit Singh was born in 1911 into a Hindu family in Musakhel. He later converted to Sikhism. He was educated at the Hailey College of Commerce in Lahore.

== Career ==
He started his banking career at the Central Bank of India in 1932, with him later working at the United Commercial Bank (UCO Bank) from 1944 to 1960. In 1960, he joined the Punjab & Sind Bank and worked as a general manager until 1965. In 1968, he became the chairman of the bank and between 1980 and 1981, he was both the chairman and managing director. Under his tenure, the bank expanded by opening 546 new branches between 1968 and 1981. Also during his time at the bank, much emphasis was paid on Sikh heritage and promotion of Sikh teachings.

The bank started publishing a Sikh history calendar in 1974 containing reproductions of paintings commissioned from Sikh artists to create for the calendar. In 1980, the bank was nationalised by the Indian government and ceased to be a private institution.

In 1995, he founded the Bank of Punjab.

== Legacy ==
He is credited with expanding rural banking.

Three books have been written on him, one published in 1982, another in 2011, and a third in 2025 written by his son Tejbir Singh.
