= Susral =

1962 film

- Directed by: Riaz Shahid
- Written by: Riaz Shahid
- Produced by: Riaz Shahid
- Starring: Laila; Yousuf Khan; Allauddin; Agha Talish; Nighat Sultana; Diljeet Mirza
- Cinematography: Fiaz Sheikh
- Music by: Hassan Latif
- Production company: Movie Models
- Release date: 19 October 1962
- Country: Pakistan
- Language: Urdu

Susral is a 1962 Pakistani social film, directed by Riaz Shahid in his directorial debut, who also wrote the screenplay based on a story from his own novel "Hazar Dastaan".

Its music was composed by Hassan Latif with lyrics by Tanvir Naqvi and Munir Niazi. It deals with common man problems such as physical disabilities and social injustice. It ranks among the few realistic films of the Lollywood from the 1960s. From the Golden Age of Pakistani cinema, this film was what now is called as an art film. It failed at the box office.

This film marked the debut for Mehdi Hassan as a solo playback singer, as he performed the song "Jis ne mere dil ko dard diya".

On 9 March 2019, it was screened by ‘Mandawa Club’ of Lok Virsa Museum in Pakistan.

== Plot ==
Majid, alias Jida, is a musician from the Walled City of Lahore who plays the shehnai at weddings. He's getting older and is worried about his marriage. His friend, Ahmad, who is a pigeon fancier, introduces him to a marriage bureau. The owner of the marriage bureau convinces Jida to get engaged to a handicapped girl Safia.

When the engagement is finalized, Jida is overjoyed. He visits Safia's house with his friends Ahmad and Bhola to finalize the arrangements. However, instead of showing Safia, Jida's in-laws show him her younger sister, Zareena, and finalize the engagement with Jida.

Ahmad, who loves Zareena, thinks Jida is engaged to her and considers her unfaithful. On the wedding day, Jida brings home the bride, and when he lifts her veil, he's shocked to see that it's Safia, not Zareena. Jida refuses to accept Safia as his wife.

When Ahmad finds out that Jida is married to Safia, he visits Safia's father to inquire about her. Zareena meets Jida again and tries to make him realize his mistake. Ahmad, who wants to marry Zareena, makes a deal with her father: if Ahmad can convince Jida to accept Safia as his wife, Zareena will marry him. However, Ahmad's initial efforts fail, and he tries to convince Zareena to elope, but she refuses.

Zareena's father learns about this and is proud of her daughter's behavior. He agrees to her marriage with Ahmad without any conditions. Zareena initially hesitates, prioritizing her elder sister Safia's happiness, but later agrees when Jida realizes his mistake and decides to accept Safia as his wife. In the end, Jida goes to his in-laws' house to take Safia home, and Ahmad and Zareena get married.

== Cast ==
- Yousuf Khan as Ahmad
- Laila as Zarina
- Allauddin as Majeed "Jeeda"
- Nighat Sultana as Safia
- Agha Talish as Zarina and Safia's father
- Diljeet Mirza as Bhola
- Rukhsana as Chandi
- Lehri as Marriage bureau owner
- Sultan Rahi (extra)

== Soundtrack ==
All lyrics are written by Tanvir Naqvi and Munir Niazi; all music is composed by Hassan Latif

Susral
No.	Title	Lyrics	Singer(s)	Length
1.	""Idhar bhi dekhein ik nazar, aapka kya jaaye ga""		Ahmed Rushdi, Irene Perveen
2.	""Ja, apni hasraton par aanso baha ke soja""	Munir Niazi	Noor Jehan
3.	""Jis ne mere dil ko dard diya""	Munir Niazi	Mehdi Hassan
4.	""Aaye ga sanam, jab nazren milen gi""		Naseem Begum
5.	""Kabhi muskura, kabhi jhoom ja""		Ahmed Rushdi and chorus
6.	""Kaisi hai chup chap, so geyin""		Asif Khan
