= Banuri, Himachal Pradesh =

Banuri
- Suburb
- Location within Himachal Pradesh
- Coordinates: 32.100°N 76.555°E
- Country: India
- State: Himachal Pradesh
- District: Kangra
- Time zone: UTC+5:30 (IST)
- Pin Code: 176 061

Banuri (Palampur) is Ward No. 14 of MC Palampur which is situated in Dhauladhar Valley in Himachal Pradesh (India). It has around 4 km area and population around 3000. Banuri has many tea gardens. It has a small river (khad) named Oa at its one end. It is situated 4 km away from Palampur ISBT. Also near by is artists' colony Andretta, Himachal Pradesh.

== Education ==
The literacy rate in Banuri is very high. It has four Senior Secondary schools:-

- Saheed Major Sudhir Walia Senior Secondary School.
- Aisect Computer Education Lower Banuri.
- Jai Public School.
- Crescent Public School.
- Modern Public School.
- Sri Sai University, Palampur is situated 2 km away from here.
- Dr GC Negi College of Veterinary and Animal Sciences is situated 1 km away from here.
- CSIR-Institute of Himalayan Bioresource Technology is situated 1.5 km away from here.

== Other Attractions ==
- Palampur Science centre
