= Mehar Singh (artist) =

Sikh artist

Portrait of the Sikh artist Mehar Singh

Mehar Singh (1 October 1929 – 26 August 2020), also spelt as Meher Singh, was a Sikh artist. He served as the president of the Punjab Lalit Kala Akademi. He focused on portraiture. He painted many works depicting scenes and figures from Sikh history. He also made portraits of artists, poets, film personalities, and politicians. A master of Indian realism, Mehar Singh was a disciple of Sobha Singh. He was honoured by the All-India Fine Arts and Crafts Society and the Punjab Lalit Kala Academy.

== Early life ==
Mehar Singh was born to parents Saudagar Singh and Mahinder Kaur in Lahore, British India on 1 October 1929. His family were engaged in wood craftsmenship and had a workshop. He was educated at DAV College, Lahore and Mayo School of Art, Lahore. Two of his uncles worked at the school (New School of Art in Gole Market, Lahore) as teachers. He became a full-time apprentice of the famous Sobha Singh in 1946 after being recommended to see him by a family friend but managed to also continue his college education via evening studies to please his father. Initially, Sobha Singh did not interact with Mehar Singh for the first six months, perhaps as a test to ensure Mehar was dedicated to pursuing art seriously, with him afterwards serving as Mehar's ustad. He studied artwork during the morning and afternoon and spent the evening at college. Due to the partition of Punjab in 1947, Mehar Singh shifted initially to Puranpur in Uttar Pradesh and later to Andhretta in Himachal Pradesh, where Sobha Singh, his master, resided. Sobha Singh had shifted his atelier to Andretta before the partition occurred. Mehar also travelled to Ambala and Bombay with Sobha Singh.

== Career ==
After completing his art apprenticeship under Sobha Singh, Mehar Singh went to Delhi where he found work painting calendars for Mehta Art Press, alongside his friend Brij Bhushan, creating works of Ram Durbar and Hanuman. He also studied art at Delhi Polytechnic at the same time. In 1958, he started working at the American Embassy as an artist for the United States Information Service, where he created busts and painting of American presidents, with one of Nixon being popular. After receiving harsh criticism from a friend, he stopped creating art for a while until he met M. S. Randhawa who encouraged to take up the trade again. He further developed his artisan skills due to helpful critique given to him by M. S. Randhawa. Aside from Sobha Singh, Mehar's work was also influenced Rembrandt, Raphael, Andrew Loomis, Howard Pyle, and Norman Rockwell. Eventually, a work of his depicting Maharaja Ranjit Singh was recognized and he was bestowed with an award. He won first place in the competition and was awarded Rs. 5000, with an addition Rs. 500 being gifted by Sobha Singh.

He completed a painting of Guru Gobind Singh after receiving a commission from S. S. Anand. Motivation from Principal Satbir Singh of Panjab University led him to completing a work depicting Banda Singh Bahadur. He began being interested in painting Sikh religious and historical figures after these experiences. Some institutions that commissioned him to complete Sikh history-related paintings were the Shiromani Gurdwara Parbandhak Committee, Balbir Singh of Sahitya Kendra in Dehradun, Bank of Punjab, and Punjab and Sindh Bank. He was unable to find a suitable disciple although he was willing to educate them for free, as most persons who came to him were initially motivated but eventually abandoned the affair after realising there was no quick way to success, fame, and wealth.

In the 1980s, Mehar Singh shifted to Chandigarh. In 2001, he received the Sardar Sobha Singh memorial award. In around 2005, he stopped painting due to an accident he suffered from. In 2012, he was gifted the Punjab Rattan Award.

== Death ==
In December 2019, his sons brought him to Delhi from Chandigarh due to his poor health. Mehar Singh died on 26 August 2020 and his ashes were laid in a crematorium in Delhi on the same day.

== Style ==
As per Mehar Singh, his artwork was to "show the right way to lead life, to spread happiness". He focused on creating portraits of artists, poets, writers, and politicians with an attempt to portray their unique characteristics rather than being exact likenesses, with him spending time with the subject before have to form an opinion on their quirks and traits. However, sometimes he could not meet the person depicted and had to create a portrait based on a photograph. Mehar Singh's works are influenced by realism, particularly classical realism, clarity of thought, and depth of composition. He utilized various colours to create richness in his compositions, with the paintings being precises and true-to-life. Special attention was paid to the attire of the depicted figures, such as jewellery and costume. He was a painter of the Yakhartha style whose subject matter of art was mostly portraiture, landscape, and Sikh history. He did not believe in abstract art. He was influenced by Sobha Singh but also Europeans and Americans, such as Rembrandt, Raphael Andrew Loomis, Howard Pyle, and Norman Rockwell. He did not understand or enjoy contemporary art, with him stating "I think some artists are trying to pass worthless stuff in the name of modern art", although he appreciated some compositions, colours, and symbolism in contemporary art, especially after the artist explained it to him. Bhagat Singh Bedi was influenced by the artwork of Mehar Singh.

== Collection ==
Some of his works depicting famous personalities are kept in the collection of the Portrait Gallery at Punjab Kala Bhawan, Sector 16 B, Chandigarh.

== Positions held ==
- President of Punjab Lalit Kala Akademi (two consecutive terms)
- Vice Chairperson of Punjab Kala Prishad

== Awards ==
- Sobha Suingh Memorial Award (by the Punjab Government) – 2001
- Punjab Kala Rattan (by Punjab Lalit Kala Akademi)
- AIFACS award
- YMCA award
