= Punjabi theatre =

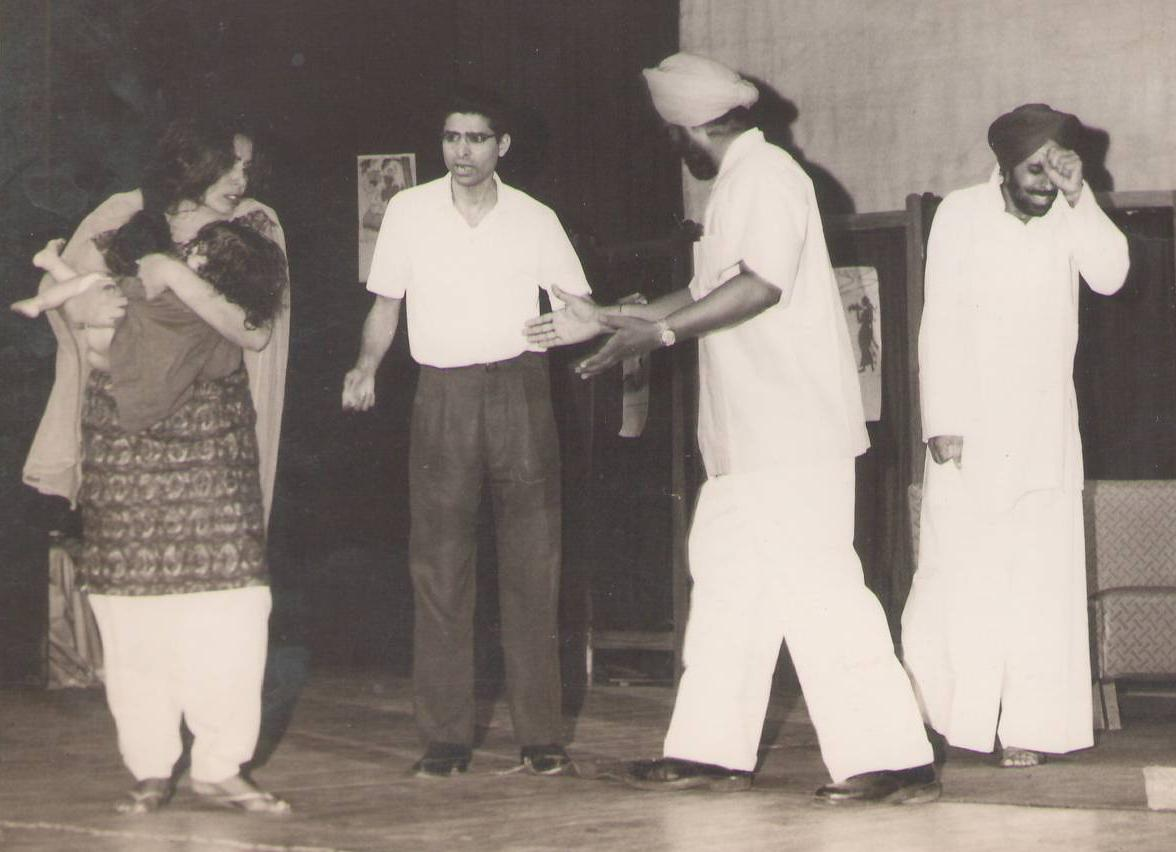
A production of the play Jeeundi Lash, by Kapur Singh Ghuman.

Punjabi theatre, also known as Punjabi drama, refers to theatre in the Punjabi language, practised primarily in the Punjab regions of India, Pakistan, and wherever the Punjabi diaspora exists.

Modern Punjabi drama emerged in the early 20th century in Lahore, with works such as Bawa Buddh Singh's Chandar Hari (1909) and Bhai Vir Singh's Raja Lakhdata Singh (1910). Norah Richards and playwright Ishwar Chander Nanda contributed to the development of Punjabi-language theatre in Lahore. Nanda's one-act play Suhag (later known as Dulhan), written in 1913, became one of the earliest Punjabi plays staged. Over the next century, it developed through the work of playwrights and theatre practitioners including Balwant Gargi, Sant Singh Sekhon, Gursharan Singh, Sheila Bhatia, Harpal Tiwana and Neelam Mansingh Chowdhry. Popular stage comedy also developed as a prominent form of theatrical entertainment in Pakistan.

== Overview ==
Modern Punjabi theatre

Later on actors of Faisalabad became famous in the scene and choreographed dances on Punjabi film songs were also introduced which increased the popularity of these stage shows considerably. Sometimes the plays also carry a moral. Punjabi dramas are popular with the lower and middle class and were made famous through distribution on CD's in the mid and late 1990s. Recently, due availability of these dramas on YouTube, they have also become increasingly popular in Punjab region of India.

Sabir Raj, a supporting actor who has worked at the Alhamra Theatre for many years, has stated that earning a living as an actor is particularly difficult for extras and supporting performers. He noted that supporting actors may receive around Rs5,000 for minor roles, whereas stage plays and theatre productions are more viable for actors in leading roles. According to Raj, lead performers tend to receive more consistent work in smaller productions and find the experience more professionally rewarding than film acting. He further observed that lead actresses in such productions may earn starting salaries of around Rs30,000, while established stars can command fees of up to Rs1 million per performance.

== Genre of comedy ==
Punjabi dramas are semi-improvisational. Mostly actors keep going on for several minutes, taunting each other. The plays are scripted but actors and performers are given enough freedom to add humour along the way while staying within boundaries. Punjabi dramas are characterized by taunts which are almost entirely of an adult nature, although this is at many times done through wordplay which implies something else.

Women in these stage performances are often portrayed as having questionable reputations, a portrayal reinforced by comments and taunts from male performers. The humour also draws on references to well-known figures, including cricketers, Pakistani and Indian film stars, and Western celebrities such as Jackie Chan, Michael Jackson, and Colonel Sanders of KFC.

== Venues and tours ==
Stage shows are mostly concentrated in Lahore, Faisalabad, Gujranwala and other Punjab cities and also go on tours abroad to the United Kingdom, where stage shows are distributed through DVDs.

== Bibliography ==
- Phul, Gurdial Singh (1998). Panjabi Natak: Sarup, Sidhant Te Vikas. Patiala: Publication Bureau, Punjabi University.
- Sagar, Sabinderjit Singh (1998). Punjabi Natak Da Itihas. Vol. 1. Amritsar: Waris Shah Foundation.
- Sethi, Surjit Singh (1976). The Theatre of Ibsenites in Punjab: A Critical Study. Patiala: Madaan Publishers.
- Singh, Piara (2004). Punjabi Natak te Rangmanch: Sidhant, Itihas te Parvirtian. Jalandhar: New Book Company.
- Uppal, Kamlesh (1986). Absurdvad Ate Punjabi Rangmanch. Patiala: Publication Bureau, Punjabi University.
- Verma, Satish Kumar (2005). Punjabi Natak Da Itihas. Delhi: Punjabi Academy.
- Verma, Satish Kumar (2009). Punjabi Natak Aur Rangmanch Ki Ek Sadi (in Hindi). New Delhi: National School of Drama.

== See also ==
- Punjabi culture
- Punjabi music
