= Bhai Mati Das Museum =

Sikh museum in Old Delhi, India

Coordinates: 28.6565°N 77.2325°E

- Established: 2001
- Location: 110006 Chandni Chowk, Old Delhi, India
- Type: Sikh museum
- Owner: Delhi Sikh Gurdwara Management Committee

The Bhai Mati Das Museum (BMDM), also known as the Bhai Mati Das Sati Das Museum, is a Sikh museum (ajaibghar) located opposite of Gurdwara Sis Ganj Sahib in Bhai Mati Das Chowk, Chandni Chowk, Old Delhi, India. The museum is dedicated to the Sikh martyrs Mati Das and Sati Das. The museum is managed by the Delhi Sikh Gurdwara Management Committee. It is open from 7 a.m. to 7 p.m. on all days. Visitors must remove footwear and cover their heads.

== History ==
The museum was established by the Delhi Sikh Gurdwara Management Committee in 2001 under the aegis of the Kar Seva baba Harbans Singh. The body purchased the Majestic cinema-hall across the gurdwara to convert it into a museum. As per an information plaque at the museum's entrance, a story involving a Pathan with a paintbrush inspired its foundation. The plaque states that the museum was founded upon shaheedon ke khoon se rangi dharti ("site which is enriched with the blood of martyrs").

Much of the museum's collection are the original paintings that the illustrated calendars on Sikh history that have been commissioned by the Punjab and Sind Bank since 1974 were based on, which were donated by the bank to the DSGMC for display in the museum. Other sources claim the museum opened in 2005. Amolak Singh was employed by the DSGMC to create paintings for the museum as its resident artist while the descriptions for the paintings' text-panels were written by unattributed Sikh scholars.

== Collection and site ==
The museum houses between 169 paintings related to Sikh history that are arranged chronologically, consisting of 166 oil-paintings and 3 printed posters. The paintings are modern oil-paintings made in the western academic or realist style, sometimes with anachronisms. The paintings depict the Sikh gurus, their associates, and battles related to Sikh history. Each painting has a caption explaining it in Punjabi, Hindi, and English. 104 paintings depict the Sikh gurus, 21 depict 18th century Sikh figures, and 16 paintings depict Ranjit Singh. Its collection does not consist of any artefacts related to the Sikh gurus. Amolak Singh estimated that he completed around a quarter of the paintings of the museum, with the rest being donated by the Punjab and Sind Bank. Twenty-one paintings by Kirpal Singh are held by the museum. The 1984 canvases by Kirpal Singh at the museum depict the martyrdoms of Bhai Dayal, Bhai Mati Das, Bhai Sati Das, Banda Singh Bahadur, and the martyrs of the Chhota Ghallughara. Very few paintings depict events after the Sikh Empire, not covering critical events of the later 19th and 20th centuries. The museum has two-stories and also has a travellers’ lodge and a dispensary on its premises. The museum is staffed by volunteers of the gurdwara who operate its entrance-desk.

== Artists ==
Artists whose works are included in its collection are Mehar Singh, Bodhraj, Kirpal Singh, Rahi Mohinder Singh, Jarnail Singh, and Amolak Singh.
