= Sobha Singh (painter) =

Indian painter

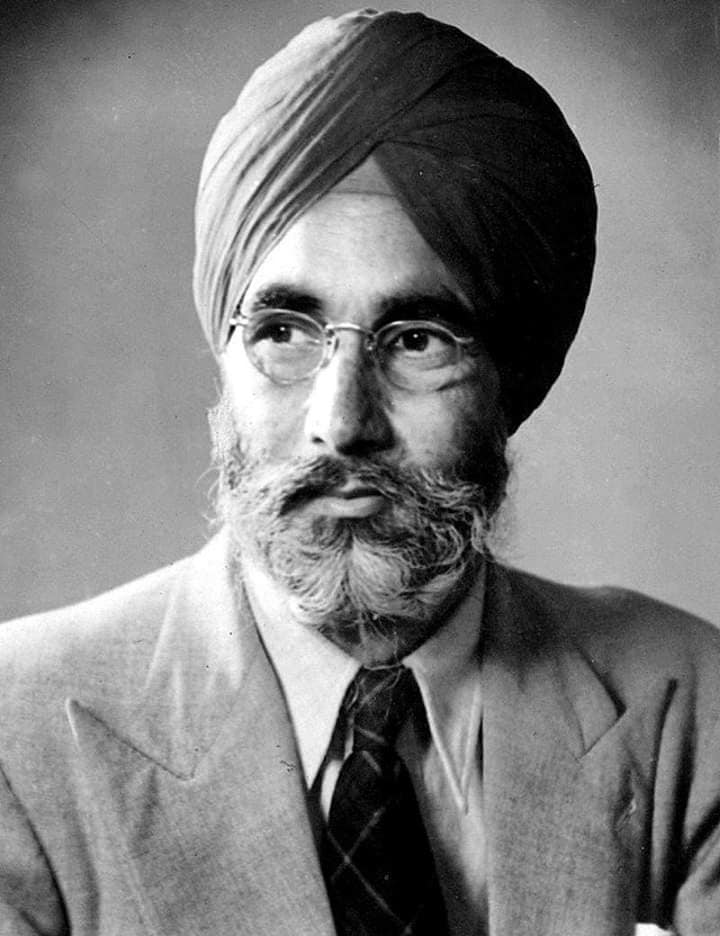
- Sobha Singh in c.1950
- Born: 29 November 1901; British India
- Died: 22 August 1986 (aged 84); PGI, Chandigarh
- Other name: Sobha Singh Naqqashi
- Known for: Painting

Sobha Singh (29 November 1901 – 22 August 1986) was an artist from Punjab, India. He was interested in artwork from an early-age, becoming heavily influenced by Western styles. He is the most renowned for his portraits depicting the Sikh gurus.

== Early life ==
Sardar Sobha Singh was born on 29 November 1901 in a Sikh family in Sri Hargobindpur, Gurdaspur district of Punjab. According to Mohinder Singh Randhawa, he was born into the carpenter caste (Ramgarhia). His father, Deva Singh, was in the Indian cavalry. Sobha Singh joined British Indian Army as a draughtsman in 1919 and served at Iraq till 1923 when he resigned from the Army and opened his own studio at Amritsar in 1923. He moved to Lahore, Preet Nagar, Delhi, and Bombay before finally settling down in Andretta in 1947 as he was forced to leave Lahore due to the partition of India. Andretta (near Palampur), a remote and then little-known hamlet in the Kangra Valley on the foothills of the Himalayas. Sobha Singh brought this tiny village on International art map by his various classic works. Sobha Singh is fondly remembered as Darji and his daughter Bibi Gurcharan Kaur, assisted by her son Dr. Hirday Paul Singh, has converted Andretta into a popular tourist destination for art enthusiasts and for admirers of his work.

== Education and training ==
At age 15, Sobha Singh entered the Industrial School at Amritsar for a one-year course in art and craft. He joined the British Indian army as a draftsman and served in Baghdad, Mesopotamia (now Iraq). In 1923 he left army and returned to Amritsar, where he opened his art studio. In the same year, he married Bibi Inder Kaur on Baisakhi day. He worked from his studios at Amritsar, Lahore (1926) and Delhi (1931).

In 1946, he went back to Lahore and opened his studio at Anarkali and was working as an art director for a film when he was forced to leave the city due to partition of the country. In 1949 he settled down in Andretta (near Palampur), a remote place in the Kangra Valley, beginning his career as a painter. This place became known due to Sobha Singh Art Gallery and Museum. The family of the late artist has also added 'Artist Residency' in the 'Grow More Good' complex.

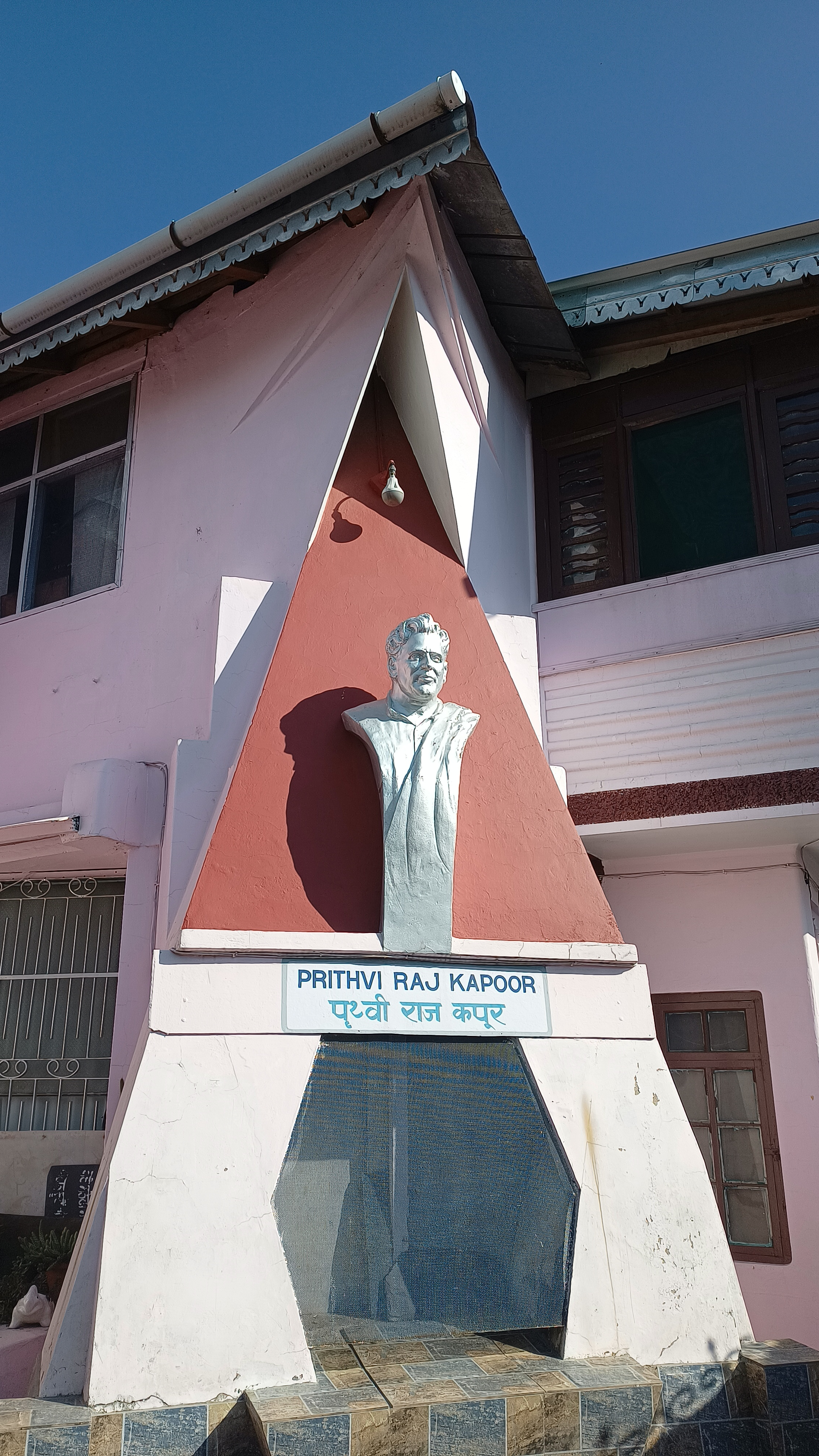
Outer Wall of Sobha Singh Art Gallery featuring a bust of Prithviraj Kapoor

== Career ==
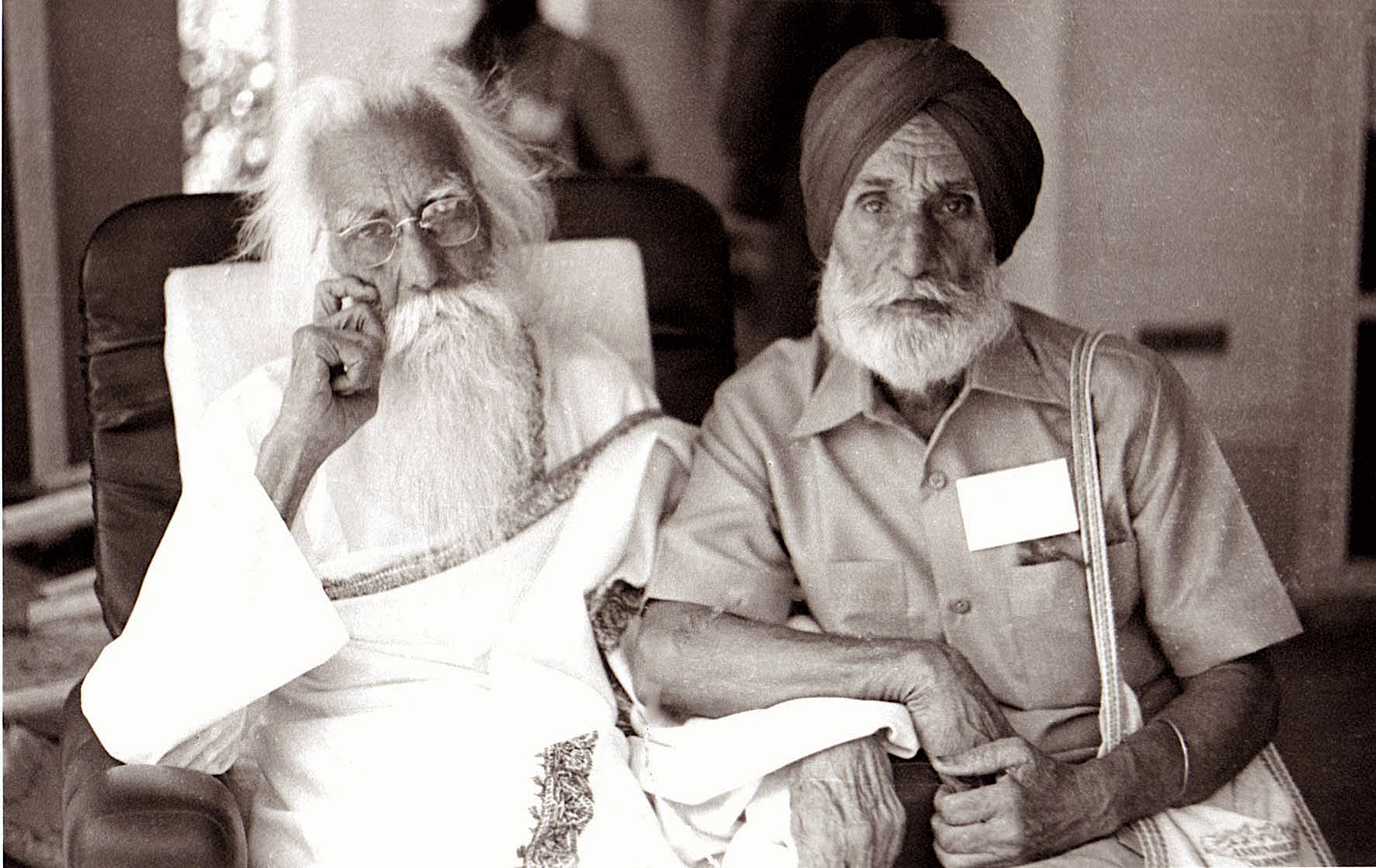
Sobha Singh with Niranjan Singh Nakodari (r) at Andretta, Apr 1986.

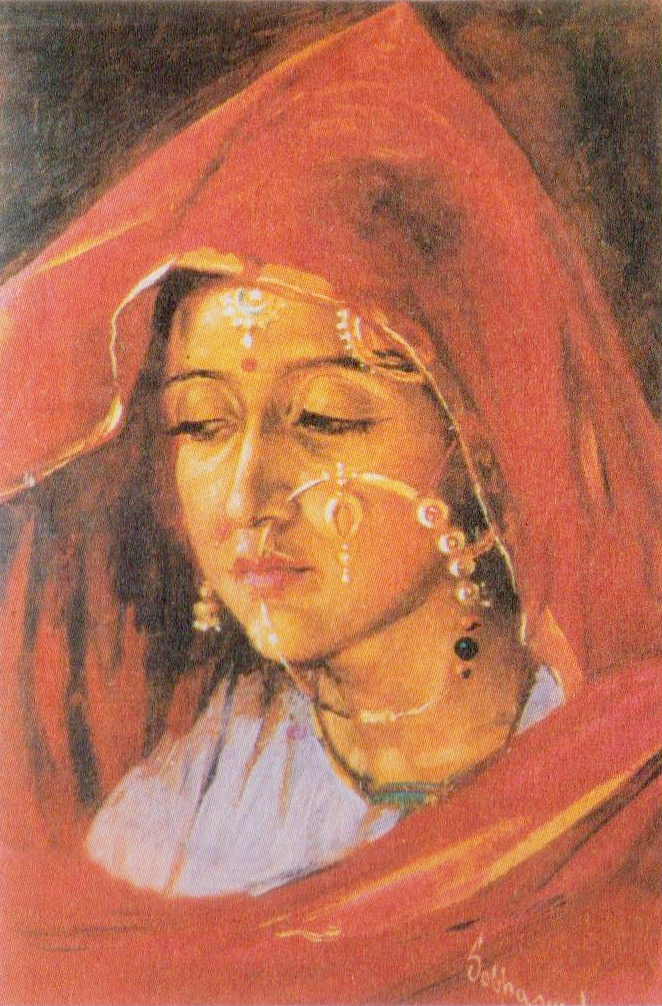
Painting by Sobha Singh on a 2001 postal cover of India

During his 39-year stay at Andretta, S. Sobha Singh painted hundreds of paintings. His main focus was Sikh gurus, their life and work. His series on the Sikh gurus have dominated to an extent that his paintings dominate the public's perception associated with Guru Nanak Dev Ji and Guru Gobind Singh ji. The portrait he made in honor of the 500th birth anniversary of Guru Nanak in 1969 is the one most people believe to be the visage of Guru Nanak. Sobha Singh painted pictures of other gurus as well, Guru Amar Das, Guru Tegh Bahadur and Guru Har Krishan . His paintings of Sohni Mahiwal and Heer Ranjha from the Punjabi folklore were also very popular. He also painted impressive portraits of national heroes and leaders like Shaheed Bhagat Singh, Kartar Singh Sarabha, Mahatma Gandhi, Lal Bahadur Shastri, etc. His murals are displayed in the art gallery of Indian Parliament House in New Delhi. The panel depicting the evolution of Sikh history features Guru Nanak with Bala and Mardana on one side; and Guru Gobind Singh in meditation on the other. Sobha Singh also dabbled in sculpture and did the busts of some eminent Punjabis such as M.S. Randhawa, Prithviraj Kapoor, and Nirmal Chandra, and an incomplete head-study of the Punjabi poet Amrita Pritam. The originals of his works are displayed in Sobha Singh Art Gallery at Andretta. The general public can also visit his studio in Andretta. Sobha Singh died in Chandigarh on 22 August 1986.

== Awards ==
Numerous awards and distinctions were conferred on him, the prominent being the title of State Artist of the Punjab Government in 1974 and the Padma Shri of the Government of India in 1983. He was conferred upon the degree of Doctor of Literature (Honoris Causa) by Punjabi University, Patiala.

The Ministry of Information and Broadcasting released a documentary film titled Painter of the People based on his life and works. The British Broadcasting Corporation also made a documentary on him in 1984. Indian Government issued postal stamp in honour of Sobha Singh in 200. In July 2023, a maiden biography entitled 'Sobha Singh Artist: Life & Legacy' has been published by BlueOne.Ink. It has been authored by Dr Hirday Paul Singh.

== Style ==
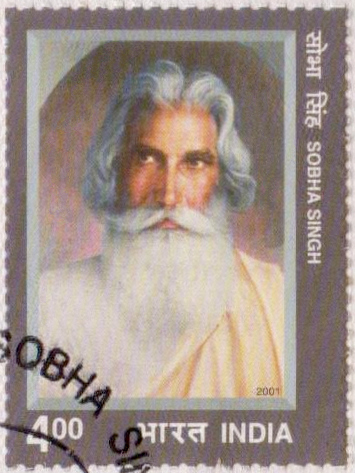
Painter Sobha Singh 2001 stamp of India.

The 20th century became dominated by Sikh painters who were influenced by the Western realistic academic style,chiefly expressed by the two styles developed by Sobha Singh and Kirpal Singh. Whilst Sobha Singh depicted calm, serene, and tranquil scenes (shanta rasa), Kirpal Singh preferred violent, terrifying, aversive and heroic ones (veer rasa, bibhatsa rasa, and bhayanaka rasa).

Sobha Singh was heavily influenced by Western artwork. He painted on various subjects, such as Sikh gurus. His most well-known works include portraits of the first and tenth Sikh gurus, which can commonly be found adorning the walls of Sikh homes. Sobha's works on the Sikh gurus attempt to portray their spirituality and stability, such as by depicting them haloed, or with half-closed eyes that have a downward gaze toward the heart. He was influenced by texts (such as the Janamsakhis, with him depicting Nanak's travels [udasi] and his companions Mardana and Bala), symbolism (especially from the Pahari school) and folklore. His style also bears Hindu and Buddhist influences in how the figures are shown glancing or gesturing, such as the depiction of the abhaya mudra hand-gesture with the right-hand. Many of his works were reproduced as calendar art.

== List of paintings ==
List of paintings by Sobha Singh
Name of painting	Description	Year of creation	References
Bhai Gurdas Ji	Bhai Gurdas	1968	
Mian Mir	Mian Mir	1968	
Akali Phoola Singh	Equestrian depiction of Phula Singh	1969	
Bhai Santokh Singh	Kavi Santokh Singh seated and writing	1969	
Guru Nanak - with Bala and Mardana	Guru Nanak with Bhai Mardana and Bhai Bala flanking	1969	
Maharaja Dalip Singh	Duleep Singh	1969	
Baba Ram Singh Namdhari	Equestrian depiction of Ram Singh of the Namdharis	1970	
Sardar Kartar Singh Sarabha	Kartar Singh Sarabha with India in background	1978	
