= Government Dayal Singh College, Lahore =

Coordinates: 31.5693°N 74.3247°E

Government Dyal Singh Graduate College, Lahore
- Established: 1910
- Affiliations: University of the Punjab, Government College University, Lahore
- Principal: Dr. Muhammad Hamad Ashraf
- Postgraduates: Post Graduate College
- Location: Lahore, Pakistan
- Campus: Nisbat Road, Lahore
- Website: gdscl.edu.pk

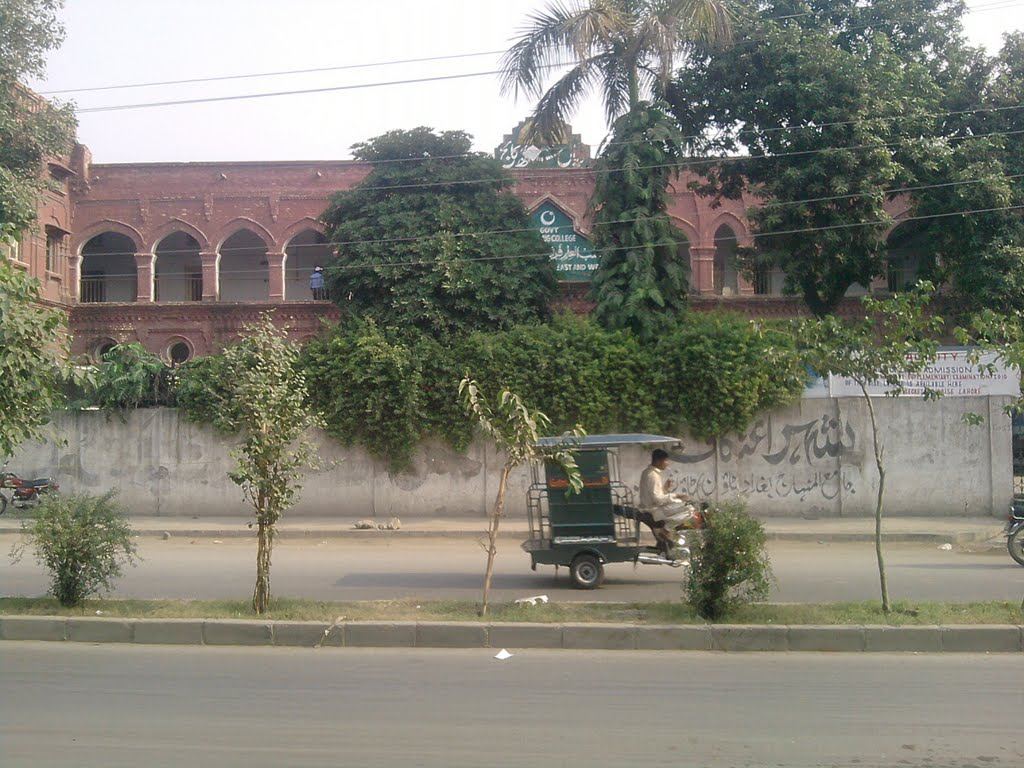
Government Dyal Singh Graduate College, Lahore

Government Dyal Singh Graduate College, Lahore is a college for graduate and post-graduate students affiliated to Board of Intermediate and Secondary Education, Lahore and University of the Punjab, Lahore, Pakistan.

== History ==
The college was founded in accordance with the will of Dyal Singh, in Lahore to implant Brahmo ideas. During Socio-Cultural reform movement in Indian subcontinent, in 1910, Dayal singh was influenced by rational, scientific ideas of Brahmo samaj (started by Raja Rammohan Roy) . He is known as the "founder of The Tribune" and the one who bequeathed his largely self-earned assets including buildings in Lahore and land in Amritsar, Lahore and Gurdaspur districts worth about Rs.30 lakh in 1898 to two trusts that established Dyal Singh College and Dyal Singh Public Library in Lahore.

The college was run by an educational trust, consisted of Dayal Singh College, Dayal Singh Library, Dayal Singh Majithia Hall and Dayal Singh Mansions at The Mall Lahore, adjacent to Lahore High Court.

Dyal Singh was a philanthropist and a lover of education. He donated all his assets for education. Including all his property in Lahore, Pakistan for the establishment of the college.

== Programs offered ==
HSSC groups

Compulsory subjects:

- English
- Urdu
- Islamic Education/Pak. Studies

Pre-medical - Physics, Chemistry, Biology

Pre-engineering - Physics, Chemistry, Mathematics

General Science - Statistics, Mathematics, Economics

Computer Science (ICS)

- Physics, Mathematics, Computer Science
- Statistics, Mathematics, Computer Science
- Economics, Mathematics, Computer Science

Commerce group (I.COM) - Accounting, Economics, Business, Math, Principals of Commerce

Arts group

- Economics, Civics, Education
- Economics, Civics, Punjabi
- Economics, Psychology, Education
- Islamiat, Civics, Education
- Islamiat, Civics, Punjabi
- Islamiat, Civics, Persian
- Islamiat, Civics, Arabic
- Islamiat, Civics, Urdu Advance
- Islamiat, Education, Arabic
- Islamiat, Education, Urdu Advance
- Islamiat, Education, Psychology
- Islamiat, Psychology, Persian
- Physical Education, Civics, Arabic
- Physical Education, Civics, Education
- Physical Education, Civics, Urdu Advance
- Physical Education, Civics, Punjabi
- Physical Education, Psychology, Education
- Physical Education, Psychology, Persian
- History, Psychology, Persian
- History, Psychology, Education

BSc. groups

Compulsory subjects:

- English
- Islamic Education
- Pak. Studies

Bachelor of Science

- Botany, Zoology, Chemistry
- Physics, Chemistry, Mathematics (G)
- Economics, Statistics, Mathematics (G)
- Statistics, Mathematics, Computer Science
- Physics, Mathematics A course, Mathematics B course
- Statistics, Mathematics A course, Mathematics B course

B.A groups Compulsory subjects:

- English
- Islamic Education/Pak. Studies

Bachelor of Arts

- Economics, Education, Statistics (opt)
- Economics, Political Science, Statistics (opt)
- Economics, Political Science, Persian (opt)
- Economics, Punjabi, Arabic (opt)
- Islamiat, Arabic, Punjabi (opt)
- Islamiat, Education, Punjabi (opt)
- Islamiat, Education, Arabic (opt)
- Islamiat, Education, Persian (opt)
- Islamiat, Political Science, Punjabi (opt)
- Islamiat, Political Science, Arabic (opt)
- Islamiat, Political Science, Persian (opt)
- Islamiat, Punjabi, Urdu (opt)
- Islamiat, Punjabi, Arabic (opt)
- Islamiat, Punjabi, Persian (opt)
- Islamiat, History, Persian (opt)
- Islamiat, Education, Punjabi (opt)
- Islamiat, Persian, Urdu (opt)
- Economics History, Persian (opt)
- Economics, Persian, Arabic (opt)

B.COM (IT) group

- BC-301 Business Statistics & Mathematics
- BC-302 Computer Application in Business
- BC-303 Economics
- BC-304 Financial Accounting
- BC-305 Functional English
- BC-306 Introduction to Business
- BC-307 Money Banking And Finance
- BC-308 Islamic Studies / Ethical Behaviours

Masters

- MSc Mathematics
- MA English

== College uniform ==
- Summer: white shirt and steel-grey trousers or white shalwar qameez
- Winter: white shirt and steel-grey trousers or white shalwar qameez, navy blue blazer/sweater/jersey
- Spring : Underwear and dhoti.
- Autumn : Natural body ( Naked )

== Location ==
The college is on Nisbat Road, near Lakshami Chowk, Lahore, Pakistan.

== Notable faculty members ==
- Sadhu T.L. Vaswani, principal, 1912-1915
