= Kirpal Singh (artist) =

Sikh artist

Portrait of the Sikh artist Kirpal Singh

Kirpal Singh (10 December 1923 – 26 April 1990) was a Sikh artist who depicted themes from Sikh history. He was employed by the SGPC, where he produced works for the Central Sikh Museum, Amritsar. His works focused on Sikh martyrdom genre, often depicting violent themes. He is recognized as one of the founders of the Central Sikh Museum, with it dedicating an album publication to him in 1991.

== Early life and education ==
Kirpal Singh was born in the village of Wara Chain Singhwala, Zira tehsil, Ferozepore district, British Punjab on 10 December 1923 in a Ramgarhia family to parents Bhagat Singh and Har Kaur. He had a brother named Gurdial Singh. His father worked in woodwork engraving, with the Jain temple at Zira's wooden gate being carved by Kirpal Singh's father. Kirpal was a self-taught artist who had no formal, higher instruction in the field. As a child, he would observe girls in his house's courtyard crafting colourful phulkari embroidery, which inspired him to create art.

Kirpal studied at District Board High School, Zira, with him learning drawing in Class V under Maulvi Mohammed Shafi. At school, Kirpal began making sketches in his notebook and copied images from his textbook. One of his earliest sketches depicted a scene from the Baburnama involving Humayun and Babur.

In 1939, he passed his matriculation and began his studies at Sanatan Dharam College, Lahore which had a reputation for catering to poor students (Putri Pathshala) as opposed to more expensive institutions. He studied F.Sc. non-medical with the subjects Physics, Chemistry, and Mathematics although he became engrossed in Sikh history, especially after reading the works by Khazan Singh and Vir Singh. In 1940, he visited the Lahori gurdwaras dedicated to Bhai Taru Singh, Bhai Mani Singh, Dehra Sahib, and Shaheedganj, which inspired in him a deep interest in to Sikh martyrology, with the birth anniversary of Maharaja Ranjit Singh being celebrated in Lahore at the same time. He obtained his F.Sc. in 1941.

== Career ==
After his studies, he became employed in the military accounts department in Lahore Cantonment, Mianmir from 1942 to 1947. As a hobby he painted landscapes and figuratives in water-colour. After partition, Kirpal shifted to Jalandhar where his brother Gurdial lived; there Kirpal quit his job and took-up painting as a career. While in Jalandhar, Kirpal was influenced by the realism works by Ilya Repin, Michelangelo, Leonardo da Vinci, and Rubens. In 1952, he moved to Delhi, where he created book covers and illustrations but realized he disliked commercial art, and then he moved to Indri in 1953. At Indri he lived in a reclamation farm in a hut for free and was the tutor of the farm's manager for Rs. 30 a month. He would send Rs. 25 to support his family and used the remainder to purchase art supplies. At Indri, he created more consequential works, including a depiction of Guru Hargobind at Gwalior Fort as well as rural scenes.

At Karnal, he held his first exhibition on 26 June 1955 at Dyal Singh College with the backing of Principal Sant Ram Grover, but Kirpal failed to sell any works at the event. Another exhibition followed at Lyallpur Khalsa College in Jalandhar in January 1956 with support from Principal Gurbachan Singh Talib, who bought some of his works for the institution. In summer of1956, the Shiromani Gurdwara Parbandhak Committee hired him as an artist om the recommendation of Professor Satbir Singh to create works to be housed in the Central Sikh Museum of Amritsar for a monthly salary of Rs. 250. He painted thirty-six works for the Sikh institution from 1956 to November 1962, however, he was unhappy in Amritsar due to poor relations with the museum's curator. He began wearing a black chola after his birthday in 1958 due to Sufi influence as he identified with its symbolism.

In 1962, he left his job with the SGPC due to his personal issues he was experiencing while employed by them, and moved again to Delhi where he stayed for a few years. In Delhi, he worked for Mehtab Singh for Rs. 500 per month and created twenty-one works, which would be presented to the SGPC. He later became involved with M. S. Randhawa and Ganda Singh under the Guru Gobind Singh Foundation requesting depictions of Guru Gobind Singh, with Kirpal being hired to carry-out the work. In May 1963 at New Delhi, he arranged an exhibition at the galleries of the All India Fine Arts and Crafts Society of his paintings. In 1967, M. S. Randhawa later convinced Kirpal to move to Chandigarh as Randhawa (who was Chief Commissioner of the Union Territory of Chandigarh) assigned a plot of land to Kirpal.

At Chandigarh, Kirpal and another man named Jaswant Singh was hired by Randhawa to create large works depicting geological history at the Museum of Evolution of Life, with Kirpal depicting dinosaurs. Other Chandigarhian patrons of Kirpal to depict Sikh works include Manmohan Singh (managing director of the Punjab Marketing Federation) and Inderjeet Singh (Punjab and Sind Bank) while military officers hired him to depict martial themes. In 1972, he created artwork depicting military personalities and battles related to the Anglo-Sikh wars for the Anglo-Sikh Wars Memorial in Ferozeshah, with some of these paintings being some of the largest ever created in India and took Kirpal three years to make. In 1984, some of the paintings he created for the Central Sikh Museum were repainted in a more intricate manner.

== Death ==
Kirpal Singh died in an accident on 26 April 1990.

== Style ==
Along with Sobha Singh, Kirpal Singh belonged to a group of 20th century Sikh artists who painted in the Western realistic academic style, with Kirpal covering martyrdoms, genocide, and death. Kirpal Singh was heavily influenced by the Western realism artists and the Italian Renaissance. He painted in the shahadat tasveeran (martyrdom images) and vira-rasa (heroic sentiment) motifs. He created hundreds of paintings of pictures, portraits, and landscapes, with him mostly depicted Sikh martyrdom and war scenes, such as the executions or martyrdoms of Bhai Dayala, Bhai Mati Das, Bhai Sati Das, Guru Tegh Bahadur, Banda Singh Bahadur, Baba Deep Singh, Bhai Mani Singh, Bhai Taru Singh, Bhai Subeg Singh, and both the Ghallugharas (Chhota and Vadda). The Sikh martyrs in his works are shown calm and unfazed to symbolise the victory of Sikh bravery over cruelty and barbarism. Kirpal depicted Sikh warriors and leaders as macho heroes, such as by depicting them armed, atop an elephant, or on horseback. The backgrounds of his paintings are shown blurred to focus on the main scene the painting depicts involving historical and religious figures whilst the background are "anonymous subordinate characters and minimal arrangement of objects". According to Sayan Gupta, Kirpal's style consisted of the veer rasa (valour) as the primary rasa, with bibhatsa rasa (disgust) and bhayanaka rasa (terror) being the secondary rasas. Kirpal Singh was a devout Sikh who drew a lot of inspiration from the life-stories of Guru Gobind Singh. Before embarking on creating a painting, Kirpal would consult his personal library collection on history and art and reference existing works belonging to the Mughal, Rajput, Sikh and Company schools. Kirpal Singh's works influenced the artist Gurvinderpal Singh.

== Reception ==
Charles Fabri left a negative review of Kirpal's works in The Statesmen but M. S. Randhawa argued that Fabri was more accustomed to abstract paintings and as a Hungarian he did not have the Punjabi or Sikh background required to fully appreciate Kirpal's works and the historical and emotional sentiments they evoked. Khushwant Singh made note of Kirpal's works in the Illustrated Weekly. According to Randhawa, observing the paintings of Kirpal were like reading a history book. Randhawa praised the anatomical-accuracy of the horses portrayed in Kirpal's paintings.

== Marriage and children ==
In 1945, he married Kuldip Kaur of Kadyal but the couple separated in 1956 as Kuldip did not support her husband's career. The couple had a son and daughter, the son Jarnail Singh was a painter. Kirpal's ex-wife lives in Moga.

== Collection ==
Works by Kirpal Singh can be found in institutions and private residences. Some institutions which contain his works are as follows:

- Central Sikh Museum, Amritsar - thirty-six works
- Sardar Baghel Singh Museum, Gurdwara Bangla Sahib, New Delhi - twenty-one works
- Bhai Mati Das Museum, Guru Tegh Bahadur Niwas at Gurdwara Sis Ganj - twenty-one works he created while employed by Mehtab Singh of Delhi
- Gurdwara Mehdiana Sahib - twenty works
- Punjabi University, Patiala - eighteen works (including seven he created for the Guru Gobind Singh Foundation now at Guru Govind Singh Bhawan)
- Punjab Agricultural University, Ludhiana - eighteen works
- Sikh Regimental Centre, Rampur, Ranchi - twelve works (originally displayed in the Army Museum at Meerut Cantonment)
- Anglo-Sikh War Memorial, Ferozeshah - eleven works
- Takht Sri Patna Sahib - eight works
- Takht Sri Kesgarh Sahib - eight works
- Government Museum and Art Gallery, Chandigarh - one work

== List of paintings ==
List of paintings by Kirpal Singh
Name of painting	Description	Year of creation	References
Unknown	Scene from the Baburnama involving Humayun and Babur	c. 1920s–1930s	
Unknown	Guru Hargobind at Gwalior Fort	c. 1953–1955	
Bhai Taru Singh Ji	Bhai Taru Singh being executed by having his scalp removed.	1956	
Bhai Mani Singh Ji	Bhai Mani Singh being executed by dismemberment.	1957	
Bhai Mati Das	Bhai Mati Das being executed by being sawed in-half	1957	
Jinnan Siddak Nahin Haria	Two Sikh heads being carried on spears by bounty-hunters.	1957	
The Even-Handed Bhai Kanhaya	Bhai Kanhaiya giving water to wounded enemy soldiers on the battlefield	1957	
The Humblemost Servant of the Guru	A Sikh boy staunchly raises his Sikh identity and awaits his execution, rejecting a chance of mercy due to a plea by his mother	1957	
Baba Deep Singh Ji	Baba Deep Singh drawing a line in the ground with his sword, proclaiming to the Sikhs that they should only cross the line if they are willing to die fighting to liberate the Darbar Sahib from Jahan Khan.	1958	
Banda Singh Bahadur	Banda Singh Bahadur depicted in a martial stance	1958	
The Victory of Multan Fort	Sikhs capturing Multan in 1818 with cannons	1958	
Darbar of Maharaja Ranjit Singh	Ranjit Singh holding a durbar outdoors	1959	
Faith Before Family	Sikh mothers being forced to wear the severed-limbs of their children as garlands.	1959	
Rangreta Guru Ka Beta	Bhai Jaita returning the severed head of Guru Tegh Bahadur to Guru Gobind Singh in Anandpur Sahib	1959	
Reward for Killing Singhs	Rupees being awarded for bringing severed Sikh heads on spears	1959	
Massacre at Jaito	Police opening fire on Sikh protesters during the Jaito Morcha of the Akali movement	1960	
Bhai Nand Lal	Bhai Nand Lal	1961	
Bhai Subeg Singh, Bhai Shehbaz Singh	Execution of Bhai Subeg Singh and Bhai Shahbaz Singh on the charkhari (spiked-wheel)	1961	
De Doi Naina Mat Chhuhao (Note: Translated in English as "Do not touch these two eyes.")	Baba Farid	1961	
In Your Home Will Appear a Great Warrior	Baba Buddha with Mata Ganga	1961	
Nawab Kapur Singh	Equestrian painting of Nawab Kapur Singh	1961	
Peaceful Resistance to Police Brutalities	Sikh protesters at Guru Ka Bagh during the Akali movement being beaten by police	1961	
Bhai Mehtab Singh and Bhai Sukha Singh	Mehtab Singh and Sukha Singh returning with the lanced head of Massa Ranghar to present it to Jathedar Baba Buddha Singh	1962	
Sultan-ul-Qaum Sardar Jassa Singh Ahluwalia	Jassa Singh Ahluwalia	1962	
Sardar Baghel Singh	Baghel Singh with horse	1963	
The Great Holocaust (1762)	Vadda Ghallughara massacre	1965	
Bidhi Chand Chhina Guru Ka Seena	Bidhi Chand rescuing Dilbagh and Gulbagh from Lahore Fort	1967	
Battle of Chamkaur [Ajit Singh]	Ajit Singh in the Battle of Chamkaur	1969	
Battle of Chamkaur [Jujhar Singh]	Jujhar Singh in the Battle of Chamkaur	1969	
Thy Will is Like Shower of Nectar	Martyrdom of Guru Arjan	1973	
Guru Sahib's Foresight	Guru Hargobind requesting his Sikhs to take-up horse-trading as a profession	1976	
Bhagat Ravi Das Ji	Bhagat Ravidas	1977	
Baba Bota Singh	Bota Singh and Garja Singh in-battle	1978	
Bhai Piraga Ji	Equestrian depiction of Bhai Piraga, the great-grandfather of Bhai Mati Das	1978	
Emperor Akbar in the Presence of Guru Amar Das	Guru Amar Das being visited by Mughal emperor Akbar	1978	
The War at Chillianwala	Battle of Chillianwala during the Second Anglo-Sikh War	1978	
The War at Sabraon	Sham Singh Attariwala rallying his troops during the Battle of Sabraon	1978	
Singh - An Embodiment of Mercy	Sikh warriors rescuing 2,200 captured women from the Durranis after the Battle of Panipat	1985	
