= Jarnail Singh (artist) =

Sikh artist (1956–2025)

Photograph of Jarnail Singh

Jarnail Singh (1956 – 10 February 2025), also known as Jarnail Singh Artist, was a Sikh artist, illustrator, designer, photographer, and art-journalist. Originally from India, he was based out of Surrey, British Columbia, Canada, where he created works documenting Indo-Canadian heritage and human rights activists. He was also an illustrator of books and magazines. He had authored over fifty articles covering art and culture.

== Biography ==
=== India ===
Jarnail Singh was born in Zira, Punjab, India in 1956. He was the son of Kirpal Singh. He began his career by helping his father but gradually became an independent artist with him focused on depicting rural Punjab, portraits of Sikh rulers, and Sikh history. He desired to document traditional Punjabi culture in his paintings as he felt that it was disappearing. Many of his works depict Punjabi women. Jarnail Singh stated:

One hundred years from now people can see my work and see how life used to be.

— Jarnail Singh, Punjab Painting (2015), page 79

He earned a Bachelor of Arts degree from Punjab University, Chandigarh. Throughout his career, he was patronised by the Punjab and Sind Bank, Central Sikh Museum, Baghel Singh Museum, Bank of Punjab, and the Punjab State Cooperative Supply and Marketing Federation Limited. He was active in the Chandigarhian art scene and the Punjab Art Council. Jarnail's wife Baljit Kaur was also an artist. In 1991 and 1992, he visited England.

=== Canada ===
In 1995, he first visited Canada. In 2000, he moved from India to Canada. In Canada, he was based in Surrey, Canada with him creating murals at Gurdwara Singh Sabha and the Komagata Maru Memorial in Surrey. On Vaisakhi 2003, the mural work he completed for the Gurdwara Singh Sabha in Surrey was unveiled. In 2015 he created a portrait of Mewa Singh for the 100th anniversary of his execution. His first exhibition in Canada was held in 2004. From 2004 to 2005, he established an artistic space. A permanent exhibition of ten Komagata Maru paintings by Jarnail Singh was inaugurated on 18 May 2016 by Justin Trudeau. Another exhibition in Canada of his was held in 2017. Some of his photographs were published in news periodicals. Some of his works are held in the Bhai Mati Das Museum. His work has been published in calendars, greeting cards and open edition prints. In 2020 he created artwork for a calendar commemorating 500th anniversary of Guru Nanak establishing the Sikh religion. In 2023, he produced a portrait of Desmond Tutu for an anti-racism calendar. His gallery Jarnail Arts was located at 106–12882 85 Avenue, Surrey. He was interviewed by OMNI Television in 2024. He also commemorated Hardeep Singh Nijjar in a portrait. Jarnail Singh died on 10 February 2025 at a Chandigarh hospital while visiting India. His death was commemorated by Punjab's Minister for Tourism and Cultural Affairs, Tarunpreet Singh Sond. He had been visiting India on an annual basis.

== Awards ==
- Achiever of the Year Award by International Punjabi Chamber of Commerce (2001)
- Daniel P. Izzard Medal by the Canadian Institute of Portrait Artists
- First Civic Treasures Award by the City of Surrey (2008)

== Exhibitions ==
- Jarnail Singh – Discovering the Soul of Punjab, Surrey Art Gallery (2004) Held from 10 April – 13 June 2004 and curated by Liane Davison and Brian Foreman
- Harrison Arts Festival, Harrison Hot Springs (2005)
- From Across the Oceans, Langley Museum
- Punjabi Visions, Reach Gallery and Museum, Abbotsford
- From The Land of Five Rivers, Surrey Art Gallery
- three shows of his Komagatamaru Stories series at Surrey, Abbotsford, and Delta
- Art @ the Library, George Mackie Library, North Delta (1 March – 30 April 2022)

== Bibliography ==
- Singh, Jarnail. Punjabi Chitarkar [Punjabi Painters] (in Punjabi). India: Punjab State University Text Book Board.
- Singh, Jarnail (2010). Vishav de Parsidh Chitarkar Shahka ਵਿਸ਼ਵ ਦੇ ਪ੍ਰਸਿੱਧ ਚਿੱਤਰਕਾਰ ਸ਼ਾਹਕਾਰ [World Famous Painters and Paintings] (in Punjabi). Unistar Books. ISBN 9788171429851.
- Rode, Ajmer; Singh, Jarnail (2014). A Journey with the Endless Eye: Stories of the Komagata Maru Incident. Ekstasis Editions. ISBN 9781771710770.
- Singh, Jarnail; Kaur, Baljit (2015). Punjab Painting. Chandigarh: Punjab Arts Council.

== List of paintings ==
List of paintings by Jarnail Singh
Name of painting	Description	Year of creation	Medium	References
Holy Men		2001	Oil	
I Have Seen Life		2001	Acrylic	
Story of Sikhism	Mural at Gurdwara Singh Sabha, Surrey	2004	Mural	
Sikh Warrior		2005	Oil	
The Poet		2009	Oil	
The New Necklace		2010	Oil	
Fall Splendor		2011	Oil	
	Portrait of Mewa Singh	2015		
	Portrait of Desmond Tutu	2023		
