= Ajaibghar =

An Ajaibghar is a term used to refer to a Sikh museum. Some examples include:

- Anglo-Sikh War Memorial
- Baba Baghel Singh Sikh Heritage Multimedia Museum
- Bhai Mati Das Museum
- Central Sikh Museum
- Mehdiana Sahib
- Sikh Ajaibghar, Balongi
- Sikh Heritage Museum of Canada
- Virasat-e-Khalsa
