= Sikh Ajaibghar, Balongi =

Museum in Punjab, India

Sikh Ajaibghar
- Location: Balongi village, near SAS Nagar (formerly Mohali), Punjab, India
- Coordinates: 30.673432°N 74.890379°E
- Collection size: Sikh warriors and freedom fighters

Sikh Ajaibghar or Sikh Museum is situated at Balongi village, near SAS Nagar (formerly Mohali), Punjab, India. The museum showcases sculptures of various Sikh warriors and Sikh freedom fighters.

The Sikh Museum was inaugurated by the Punjab minister for jails, tourism and cultural affairs, Hira Singh Gabria.

== Photo gallery ==
Earlier, this museum was operating near Laknour barrier on Landran-SAS Nagar road. The picture in gallery shows images shot in its older place.

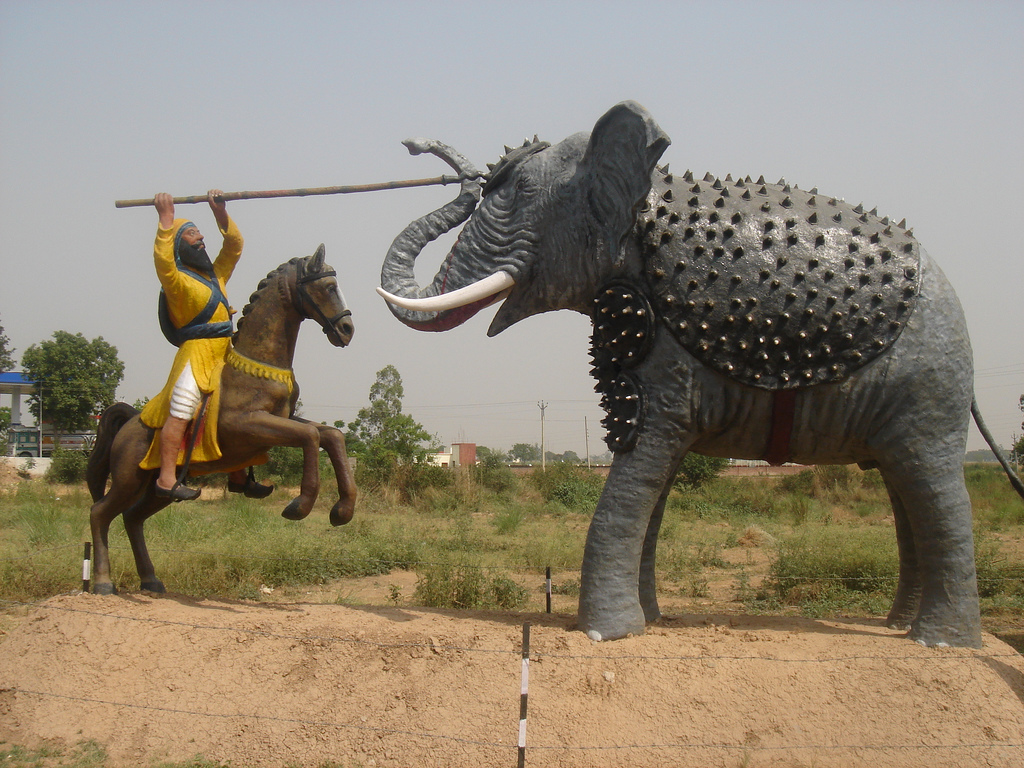
Statue of Bhai Bachittar Singh in Sikh Ajaibghar

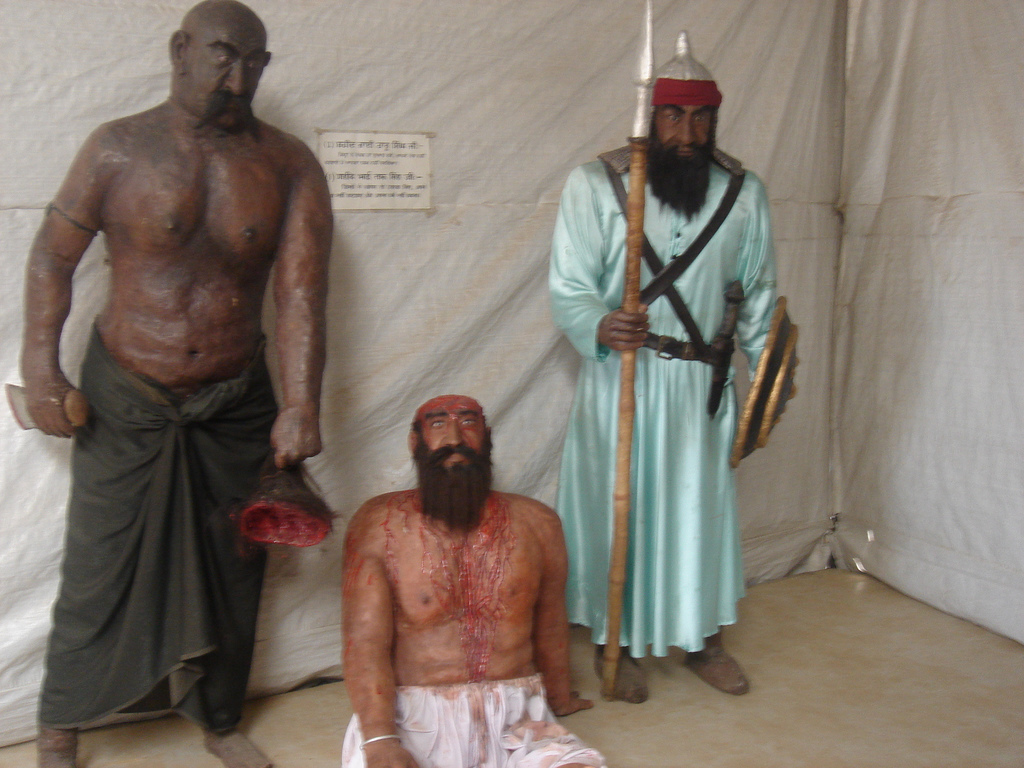
Statue of Bhai Taru Singh

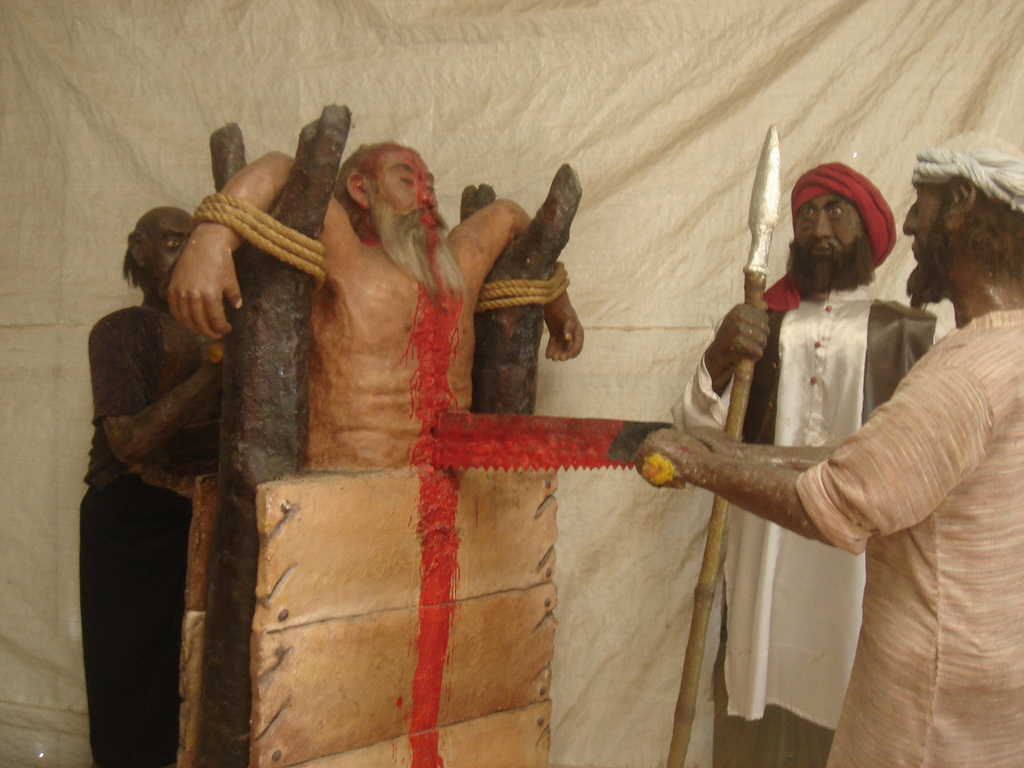
Statue showing martydom of Bhai Mati Das

== See also ==
- Mehdiana Sahib
- History of Sikhism
- Sikh art and culture
- Sikh architecture
