= Sikh culture =

The Sikhs are adherents to Sikhism, the fifth largest organized religion in the world, with around 25 million adherents. Sikh History is around 500 years and in that time the Sikhs have developed unique expressions of art and culture which are influenced by their faith and synthesize traditions from many other cultures depending on the locality of the adherents of the religion. Sikhism is the only religion that originated in the Punjab region with all other religions coming from outside Punjab (with the possible exception of Punjabi Hinduism since the oldest Hindu scripture – the Rig Veda – was composed in the Punjab region. Some other religions, like Jainism, may also claim to have originated in Punjab since Jain symbolism has been found among artifacts of the Indus Valley Civilization). All the Sikh gurus, many saints, and many of the martyrs in Sikh history were from Punjab and from the Punjabi people (as well as other parts of the Indian subcontinent).

Punjabi culture and Sikhism are mistakenly considered inseparably intertwined. "Sikh" properly refers to adherents of Sikhism as a religion, strictly not an ethnic group. However, because Sikhism has seldom sought converts, most Sikhs share strong ethno-religious ties, therefore it is a common stereotype that all Sikhs share the same ethnicity. Many countries, such as the U.K., therefore recognize Sikh as a designated ethnicity on their censuses. The American non-profit organization United Sikhs has fought to have Sikhs included on the U.S. census as well, arguing that Sikhs "self-identify as an 'ethnic minority'" and believe "that they are more than just a religion".

== Cultural societies of the Sikhs ==
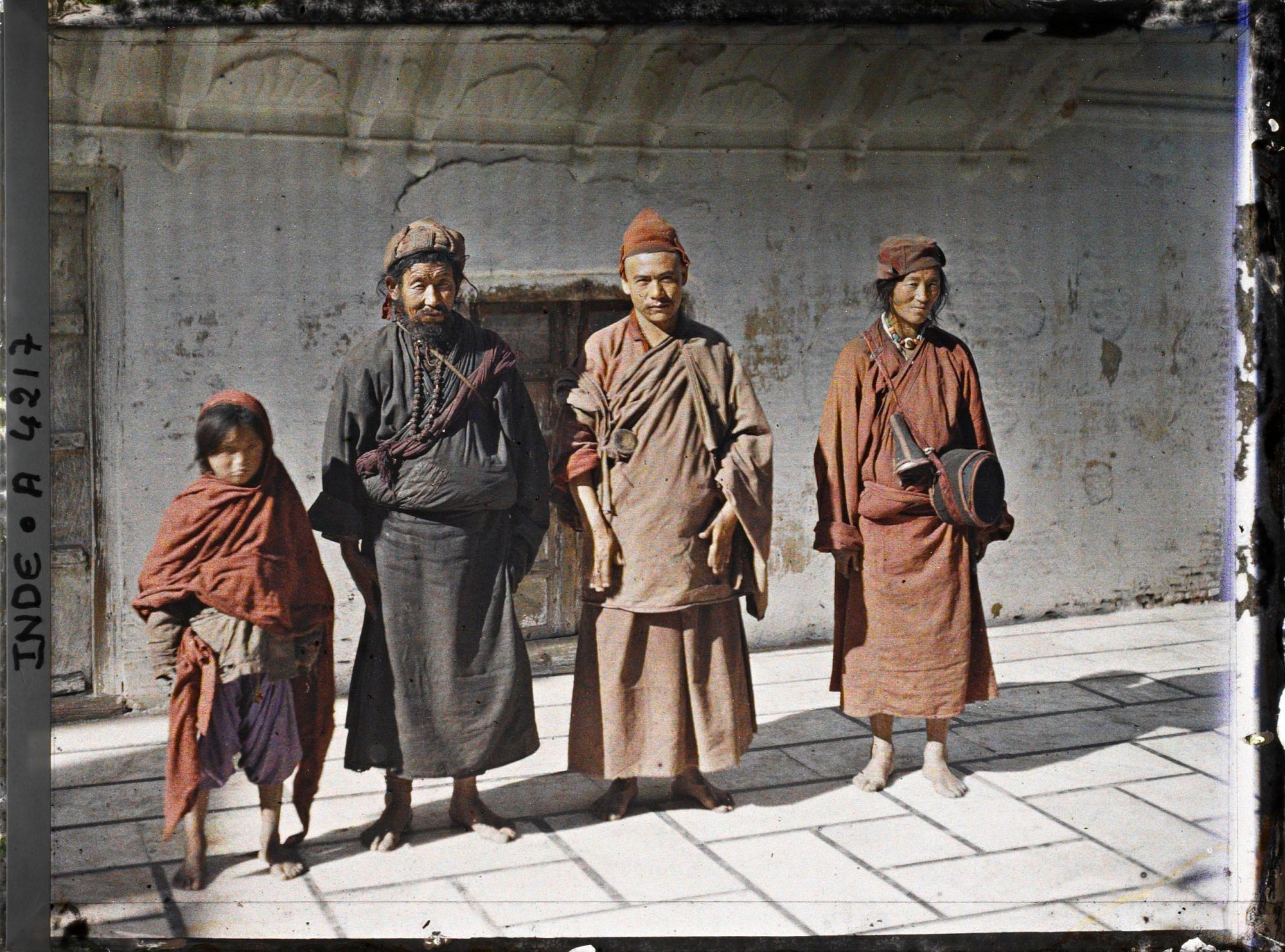
True-colour photograph - ‘Group of Tibetans at the “Golden Temple” of the Sikhs’, 15 January 1914

There is a common misconception that all Sikhs belong to the Punjab region. The religion's birthplace of Punjab itself has been called "India’s melting pot", and many other parts of Northern India due to the heavy influence of invading cultures, such as Mughal and Persian, that mirrors the confluence of rivers from which the region gets its name (from Persian, "panj" پنج meaning "five" and "-āb" آب meaning water thus meaning land of the five waters). Thus, Sikh culture is to a large extent a result of groups of various cultures uniting together, thus forming a unique one.

Sikhism has forged a unique form of architecture which Bhatti describes as being "inspired by Guru Nanak’s creative mysticism" such that Sikh architecture "is a mute harbinger of holistic humanism based on pragmatic spirituality". The keynote of Sikh architecture is the Gurdwara which is the personification of the "melting pot" of Indian cultures, full of Mughal, Aryan and Persian influences. The reign of the Sikh Empire was the single biggest catalyst in the creation of a uniquely Sikh form of expression, with Maharajah Ranjit Singh patronising the building of forts, palaces, bungs (residential places), colleges, etc. that can be said to be of the Sikh Style. The "jewel in the crown" of the Sikh Style is the Harmandir Sahib.

Sikh culture and identity are heavily influenced by militaristic motifs, with Khanda being the most obvious; thus it is no surprise that the majority of Sikh artifacts, independent of the relics of the Gurus, have a military theme. This motif is again evident in the Sikh festivals of Hola Mohalla and Vasakhi which feature marching and practicing displays of valor, respectively.

The art, culture, identity, and society of the Sikhs have been merged with the different localities and ethnicities of different Sikhs into categories such as 'Agrahari Sikhs', 'Dakhni Sikhs' and 'Assamese Sikhs'; however there has emerged a niche cultural phenomenon that can be described as 'Political Sikh'. The art of prominent diaspora Sikhs such as Amarjeet Kaur Nandhra, and Amrit and Rabindra Kaur Singh (The Singh Twins), is partly informed by their Sikh spirituality and influence.

== Physical culture ==
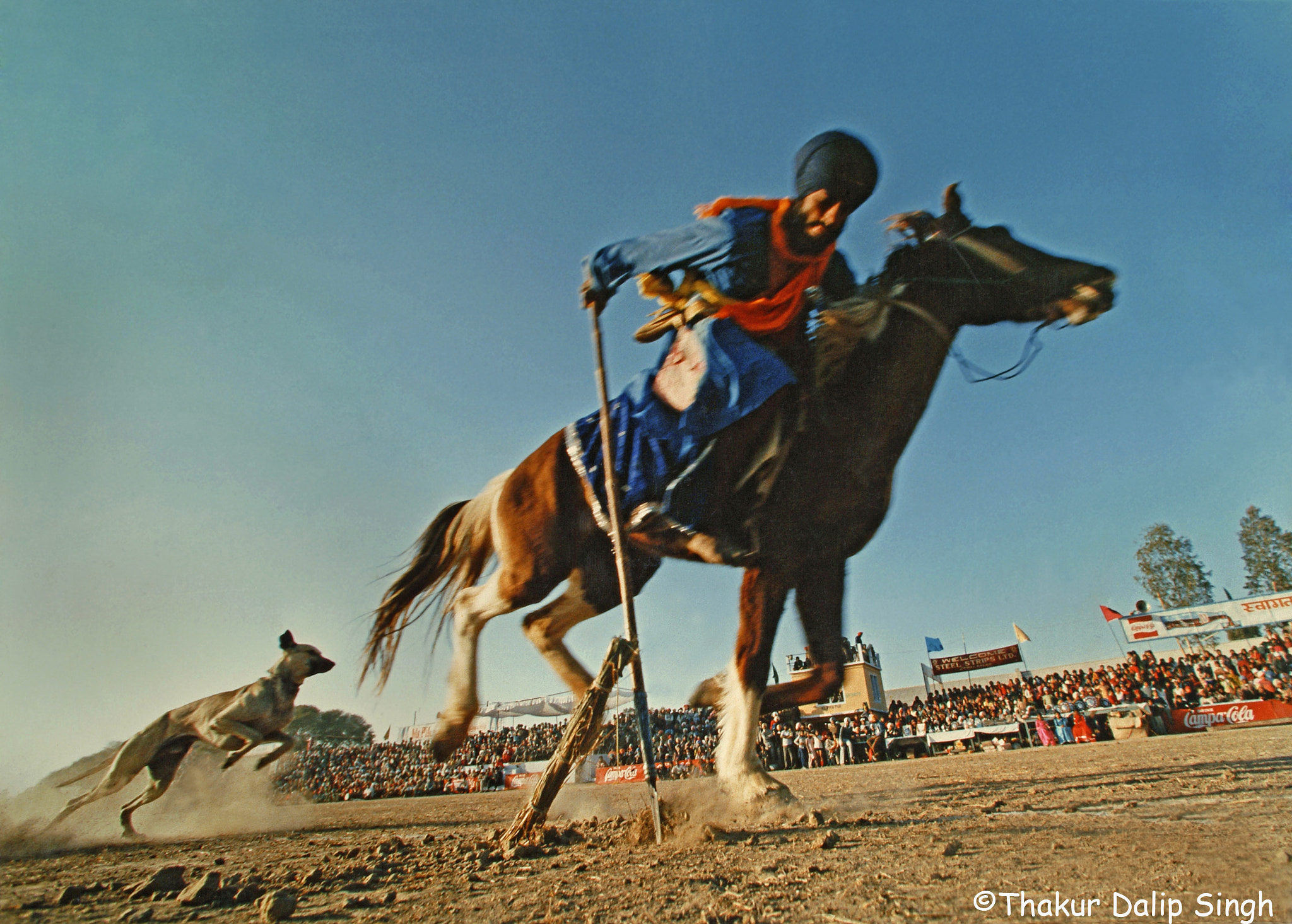
Sikh rider during the Qila Raipur Sports Festival

Physical fitness is a major part of Sikhism, having been a major part of the religion in the context of military preparedness from the time of the gurus. This saw the community become termed as a martial race by the British during the colonial era (see also: Sikhism and the British Empire).

== Culture of Sikh communities ==
Dusenbery (2014) states that Punjabi Sikhs form the majority of the Sikh population. He notes that "some Sindhis and other South Asians have been affiliated at the margins as Nanakpanthis (‘followers of Nanak’s path’) or Sehajdhari (‘slow adopter’) Sikhs" but in the main, "the Sikh Panth has remained largely a Punjabi affair". However, the Sikh community is varied and includes people who speak the Pashto language, the Sindhi language, the Telugu language and many more. The many communities following Sikhism are detailed below.

=== Afghani Sikhs ===
The Sikhs of Afghanistan have a unique culture which has elements of the culture of Afghanistan. Tatla (2014) states that there were 3,000 Sikhs in Afghanistan in his book The Sikh Diaspora which was published in 2014.

=== American Sikhs ===
Yogi Bhajan is credited with raising awareness of Sikhism amongst the non-Asian community of the United States of America. This community is known as the white Sikh community which practices Sikhism and maintains a distinct culture.

=== Assamese Sikhs ===
The presence of Sikhism has existed in Assam for over 200 years. The community traces its origins to the times of Maharaja Ranjit Singh who took his army to Assam and put some influence of the religion towards the locals. According to the 2001 census, there were 22,519 Sikhs in Assam, out of which 4,000 are Assamese Sikhs.

Assamese Sikhs follow the Sikh religion and celebrate Sikh festivals. They also celebrate cultural festivals such as Magh Bihu and wear traditional Assamese dress. Their language is the Assamese language.

=== Agrahari Sikhs ===
Agrahari Sikh is a Sikh community found in eastern India including the states of West Bengal, Bihar and Jharkhand. Agrahari Sikhs, also known as Bihari Sikhs, have existed for centuries in Bihar and Jharkhand.

Bihari Sikhs share their culture with the local Bihari community. The men generally wear the local dhoti and women wear the sari. They also celebrate cultural festivals such as the Chath festival.

=== Dakhni Sikhs ===
Painting depicting the wedding of Guru Nanak from a 19th-century illustrated manuscript of the Janamsakhi from Maharashtra

Dakhni Sikhs are from the Deccan Plateau in India located within the states of Maharashtra, Telegana and Andhra Pradesh. The traditional dress of women is the sari. The native languages of Dakhni Sikhs include Marathi and Telugu.

=== Kashmiri Sikhs ===
Ethnic Kashmiri Sikhs speak the Kashmiri language and observe Kashmiri culture. They trace their religious heritage to the influence of Sikh soldiers who settled in Kashmir under Maharaja Ranjit Singh's rule in 1819. However, the soldiers permanently settled in Kashmir.

=== Punjabi Sikhs ===
Punjabi Sikhs follow the Punjabi culture. Their traditional dress includes the Punjabi Salwar Suit, Punjabi Tamba and Kurta, Punjabi juti and Patiala salwar.

In addition to the Sikh festivals using the Nanakshahi calendar, Punjabi Sikhs observe traditional Punjabi festivals using the Punjabi calendar.

=== Sindhi Sikhs ===
In addition to celebrating Sikh festivals, Sindhi Sikhs celebrate cultural festivals such as Cheti Chand, the Sindhi new year. Sindhi Sikhs speak the Sindhi language. Khalsa Sikhs historically had a stronghold in Kandhra, Khairpur during the reign of the Talpur Mirs (1775–1955). However, most Sikhs in Sindh are followers of the Udasi, Sewapanthi, and Nanakpanthi sects. Only around 8,000–10,000 people in present-day Sindh are mainstream, orthodox Khalsa Sikh. The vast majority belong to the aforementioned sects whom may practice varying degrees of religious kinship and syncretism with Hinduism and Sufism. Udasis are generally concentrated in northern Sindh whilst Nanakpanthis can be found throughout the region except in areas of the Rajasthani cultural sphere (Dhatki-speaking areas) who practice a more mainstream, non-syncretic, and differentiated form of Hinduism. Nanakpanth and Udasipanth are different sects of Sikhism, with a major difference being that Udasis adopt a life-hood of celibacy whilst Nanakpanthis freely marry and bear children. Another Sikh sect, the Jagiasi, who claim to have been founded by the younger son of Guru Nanak named Lakhmi Das, were also historically prevalent in Sindh, especially during the period of Baba Gurupat, who was a descendant of Guru Nanak. Baba Gurupat conducted missionary works in Sindh and founded many Jagiasu tikanas (seats; a term for a place of worship in many Sikh sects) in the region, specifically in Khairpur, Hyderabad, Halani, and Kandyaro. Sindhis may have been converting to Sikhism ever since the time of Guru Nanak, who traveled to the region. Janamsakhi literature narrate that Guru Nanak traveled to Shikarpur, possibly as far as Sukkur. Sindhi women learnt the Gurmukhi script in-order to understand the Guru Granth Sahib. A lot of converts to Sikhism came from the Amil caste. The Chief Khalsa Diwan sent out orthodox Sikh missionaries to Sindh in the 1930s to preach towards Sehajdharis (literally "slow adopters"), which dominated the landscape of Sikhism in Sindh. The result was the number of Keshdhari (those who keep uncut hair) Sikhs recorded increasing from 1,000 in the 1901 census to over 39,000 in the 1941 census. Sant Thahriya Singh was a prominent Sindhi Sikh saint of the 20th century, and many gurdwaras are constructed in his name in the region.

=== South Indian Sikhs ===
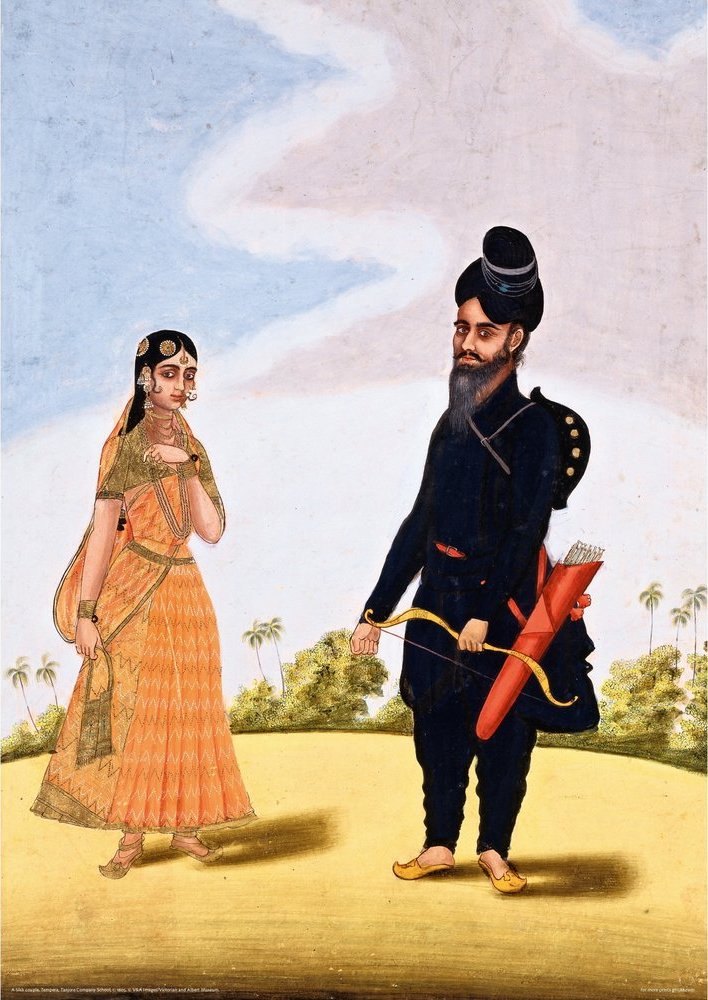
Tanjore-style painting of a Sikh couple from South India, circa 1805

There are Sikh communities in Karnataka, Andhra Pradesh and Maharashtra who converted to Sikhism centuries ago.

The Sikhs comprise Banjara and Satnami. The process of blending the religion into southern India for the Sikligars began at the time of the 10th Sikh Guru Gobind Singh, who came to the Deccan and died in 1708 at Nanded (Maharashtra).

It all came by the Sikligars as they came to southern India as expert arms-making camp followers of the tenth Guru. Sikligar is a compound of the Persian words `saiqal` and `gar` meaning a polisher of metal. The traditional occupation of the Sikligars is crafting kitchen implements.

Banjaras are a nomadic tribe who traditionally travelled with merchandise and are found across a large swathe of northern India, as well as in the south. Sikh Banjaras too travelled with armies of the past supplying them with provisions.

== Gallery ==
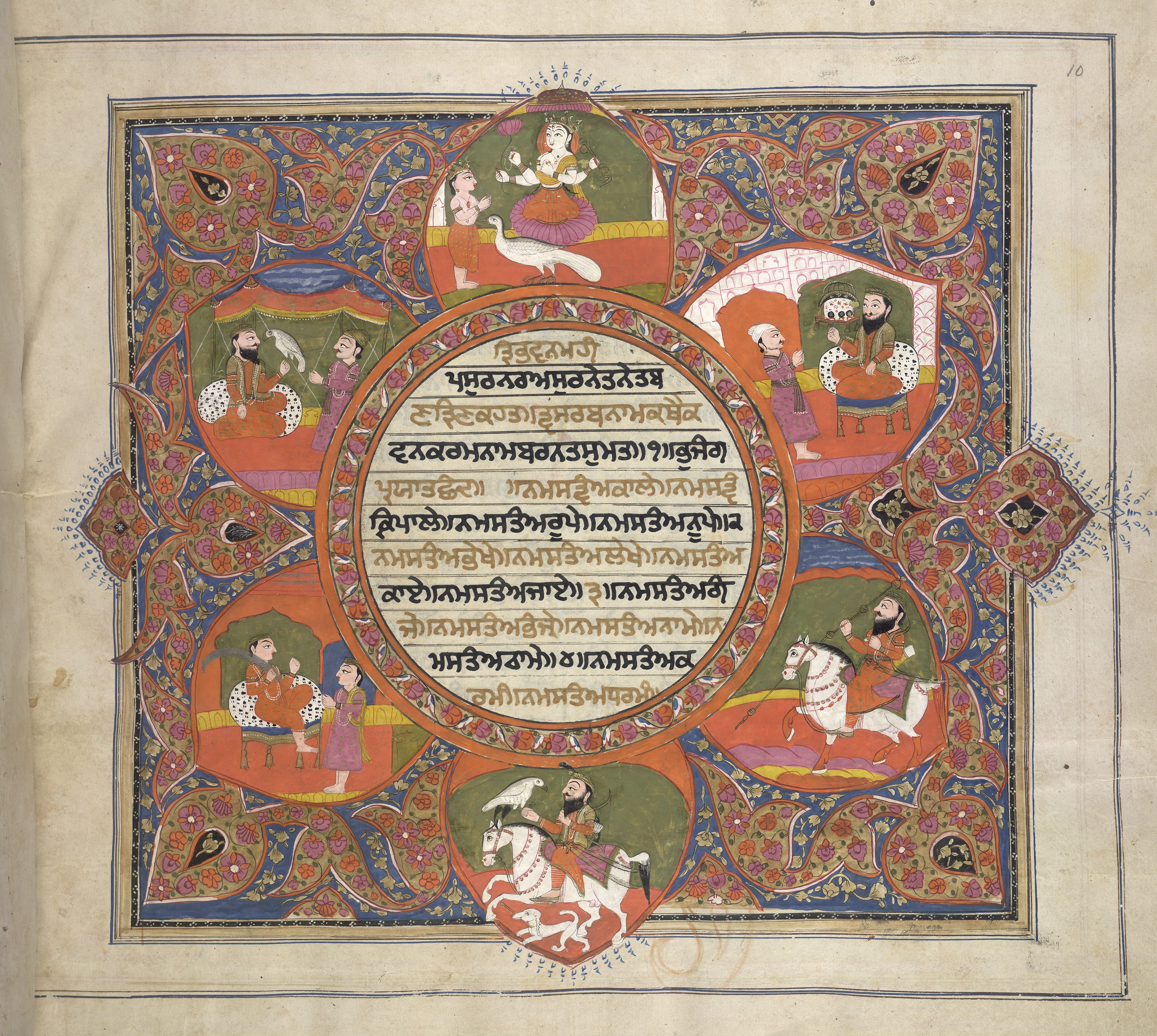
A frontispiece to the Dasam Granth.

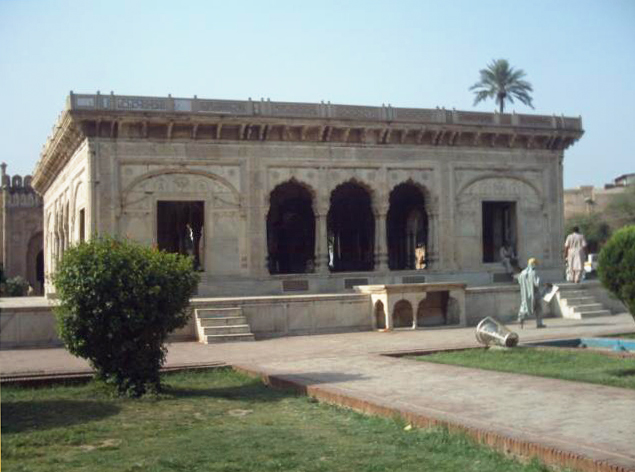
The Bardari of Ranjit Singh, built in the Hazuri Bagh.

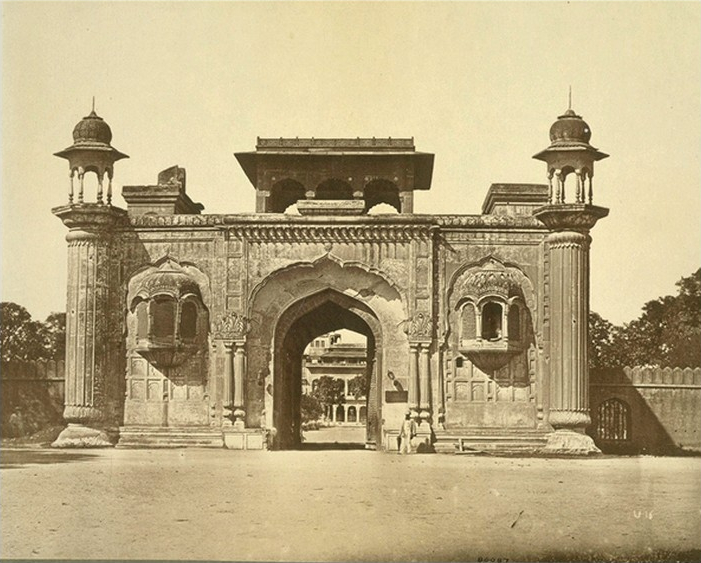
Gateway of the Ram Bagh, North-East of Amritsar; built by Maharajah Ranjit Singh.

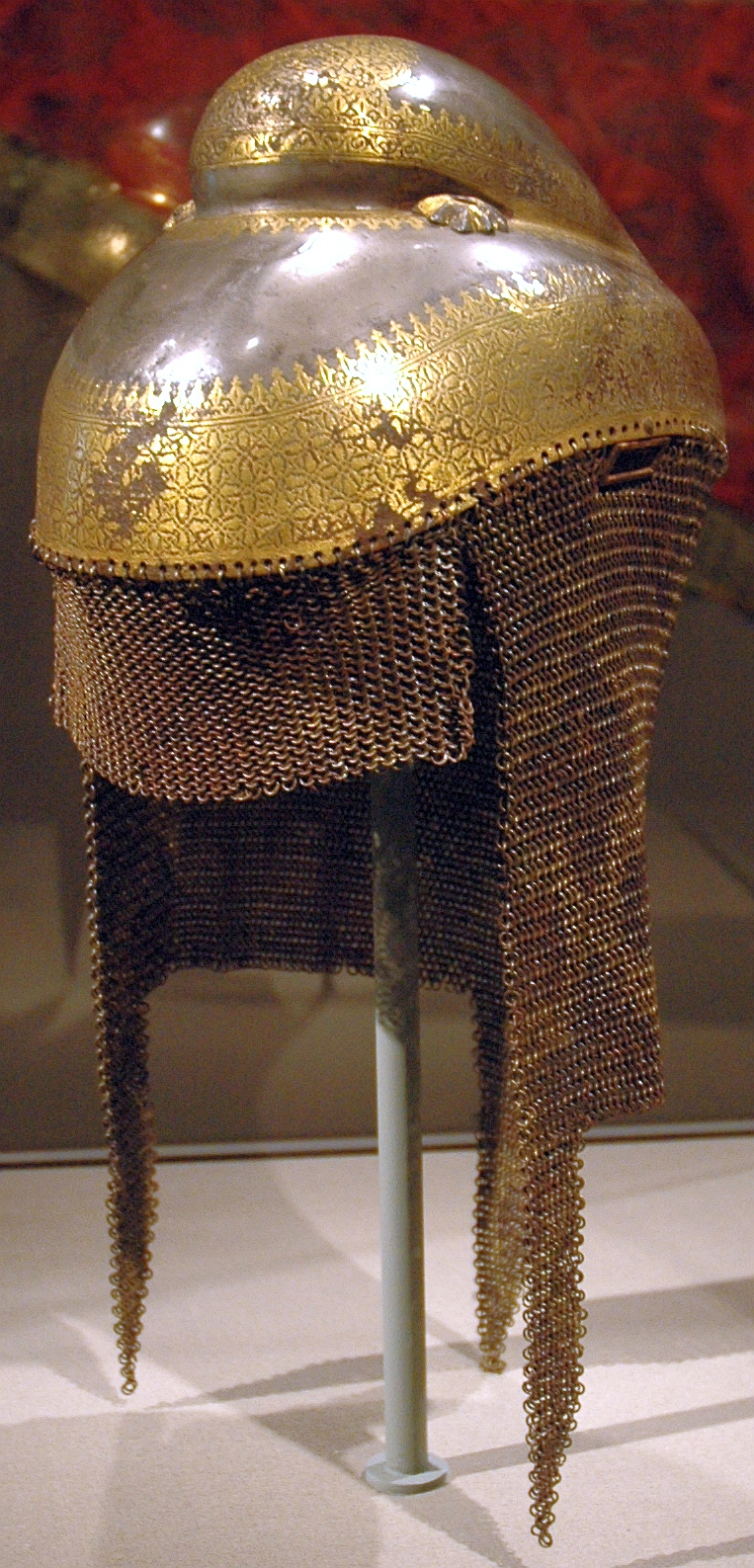
A Sikh helmet from the late 18th century. Note the adaptation on the helmet's crown to allow for a Sikh's uncut hair.

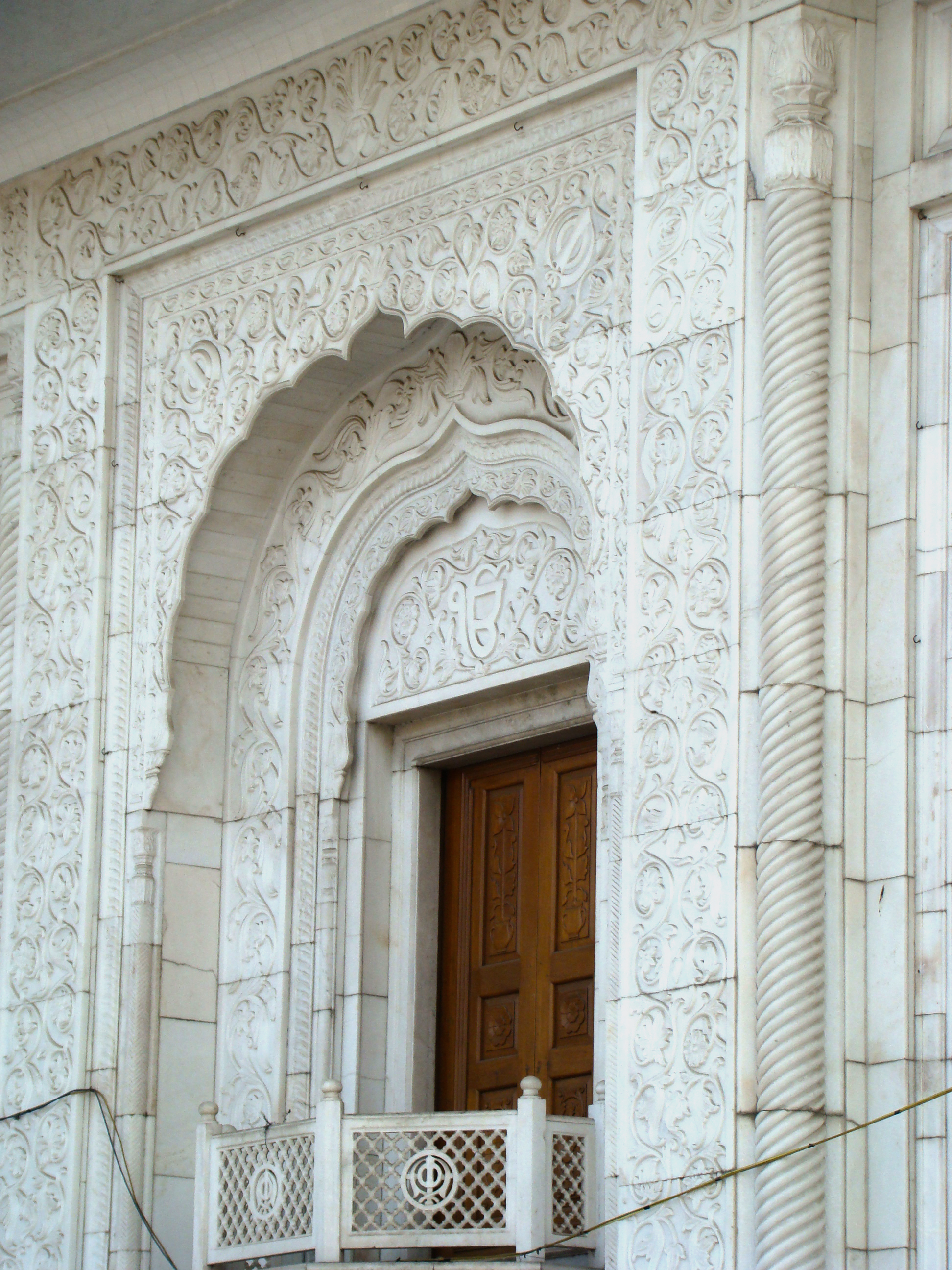
One of the gates at the Sikh temple called Gurdwara Bangla Sahib, in Delhi.

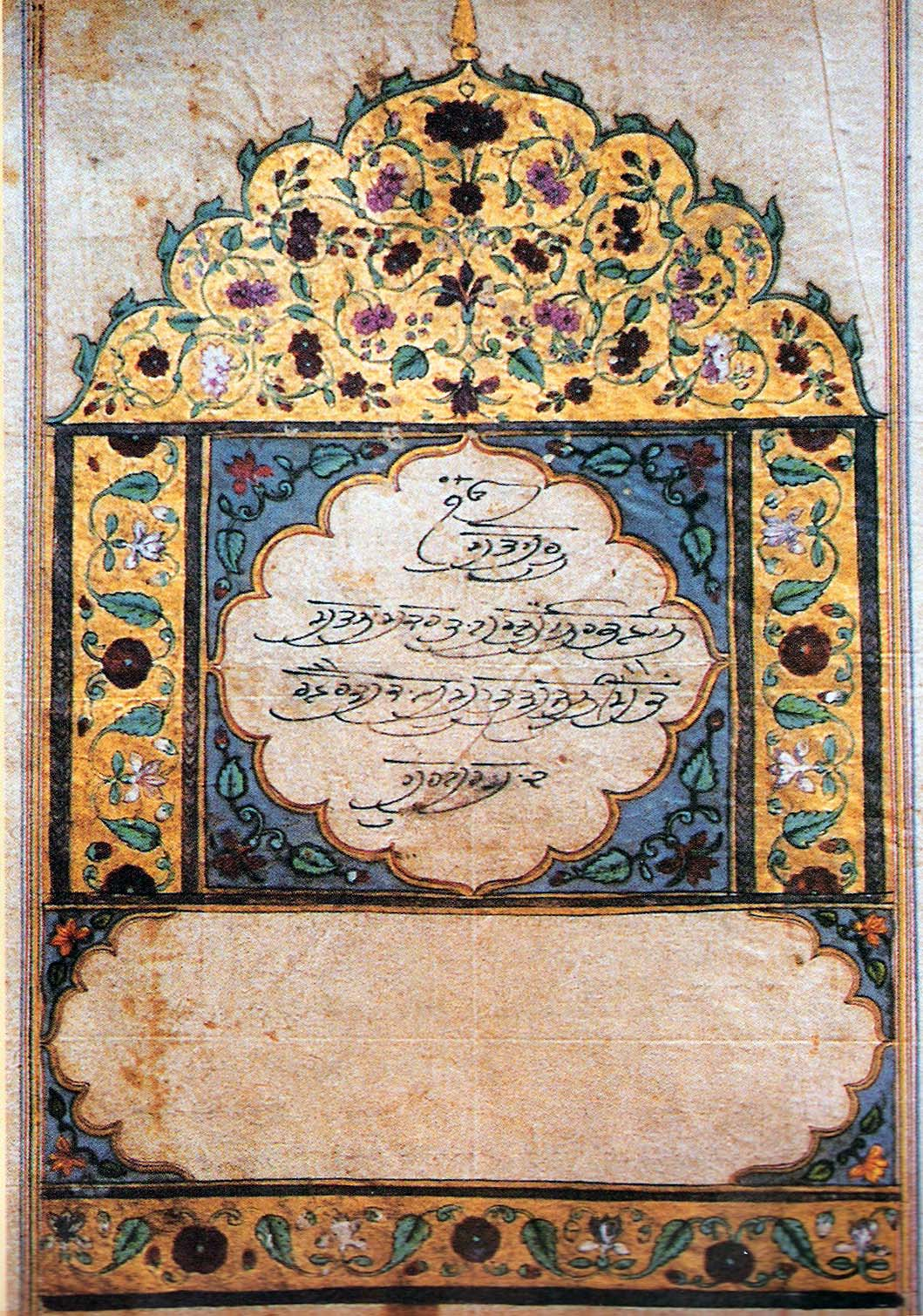
Illuminated Adi Granth folio with nisan (autograph or signature) of Guru Gobind Singh.

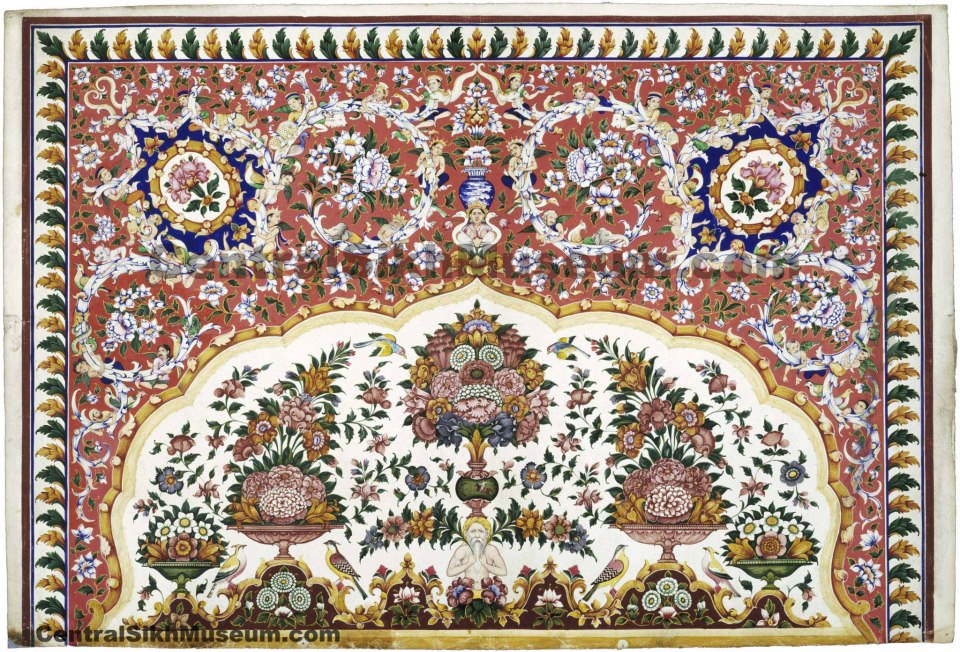
An opaque watercolour on paper, copy of Nakashi, c. 1880.

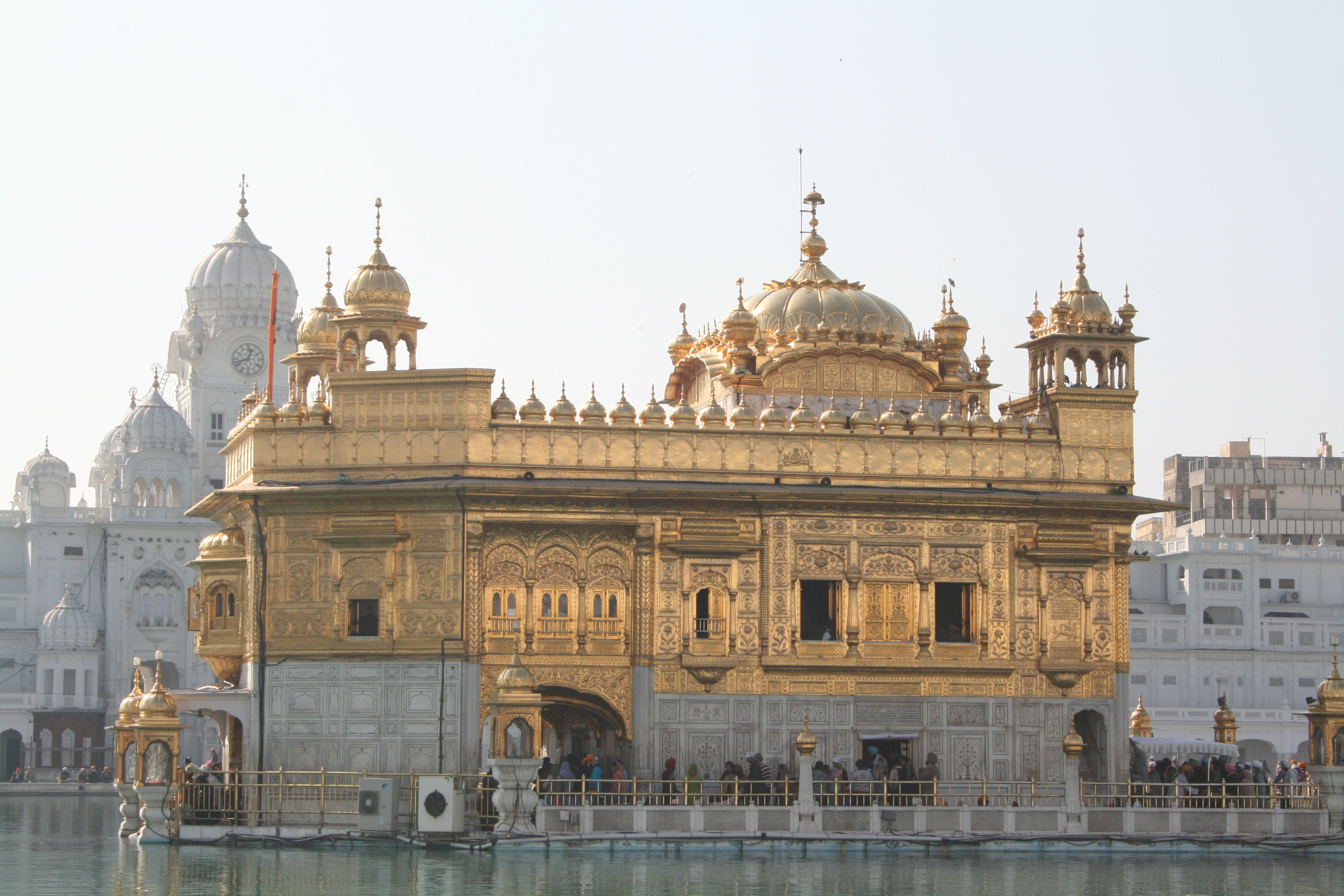
Harmandir Sahib or the Golden Temple, Amritsar, India.

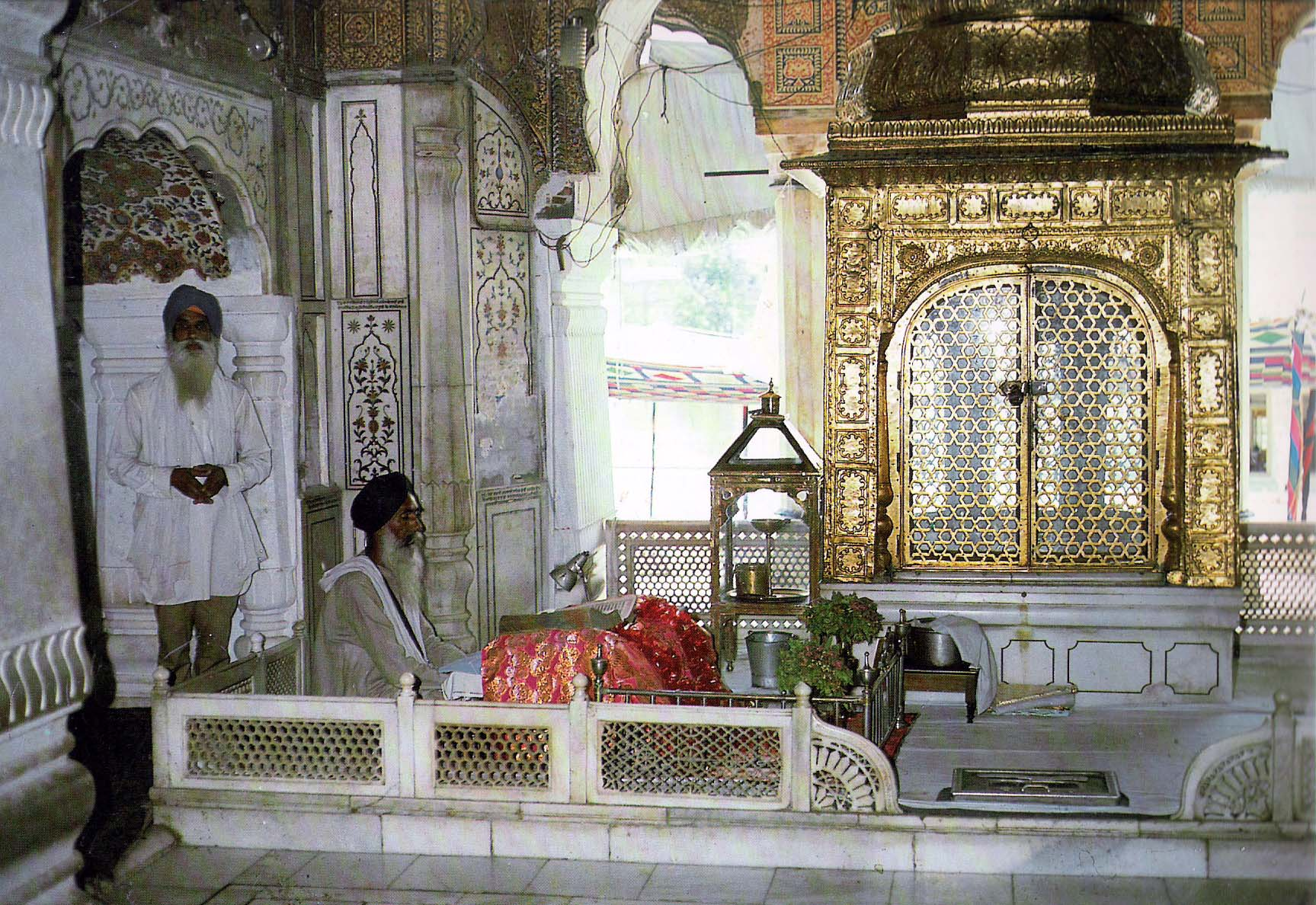
Interior of the Akal Takht.

== See also ==
- Sikh art
- Indian art
- Turban training centre
- Sikh architecture
- Sikh scriptures
- History of Sikhism
- Punjabi culture
- Shastar Vidya
- Sikh chola
- Sikh Ajaibghar
- Mehdiana Sahib
