= Central Sikh Museum =

Sikh museum in Amritsar, India

Coordinates: 31.6207°N 74.8771°E

- Kendriya Sikh Ajaibghar
- Established: 5 July 1958
- Location: Golden Temple complex, Amritsar, Punjab, India
- Type: Sikh museum
- Founders: Tara Singh and Satbir Singh
- Curator: Iqbal Singh
- Architects: Jhanda Singh and Kharak Singh
- Owner: Shiromani Gurdwara Parbandhak Committee
- Website: sgpc.net/central-sikh-museum/

The Central Sikh Museum (CSM), also known as the Kendriya Sikh Ajaibghar (KSA), is a Sikh museum and art-gallery located within the Golden Temple complex in Amritsar, Punjab, India. It is one of the largest and most significant Sikh museums. The museum contains artwork depicting Sikh gurus, saints, warriors, and leaders. It also hosts weapons and manuscripts related to Sikh history and culture. It was established in 1958 by the Shiromani Gurdwara Parbandhak Committee for the purpose of preserving and displaying artefacts related to Sikh history, religion, and culture and remains managed by the body.

== Location ==
The museum is located on the right-side of the main entrance to the Golden Temple in Amritsar. It is within the first-floor of the Ghanta Ghar (Clock Tower) structure. The Golden Temple complex is a site of significant meaning for Sikhs, with three or four main location within its premises holding significant amounts of material of historical importance: the Toshakhana (1st floor of the Darshani Deori), the Central Sikh Museum (upper floor of main eastern gate), the Sikh Reference Library (southern gate of the parikrama), and the Guru Ram Das Library (near the Guru Ram Das Sarai).

== Collection ==
The museum contains artwork, coinage, weapons, armour, manuscripts, instruments, clothing, and other items and artefacts. Both paintings and drawings can be found in its art-collection. The artwork tends to cover sakhis (stories) related to the Sikhs, their religious or historical figures, and battles or wars they were involved in. The museum houses a library and interpretation centre. The museum also hosted paintings depicting sectoral leaders. Its collection is periodically updated with new works, such as of religious, historical, political, military, and musical figures. According to SGPC president Harjinder Singh Dhami, the museum contains portraits of figures who "mad[e] great contributions to Panthic causes and sacrifice for the community." At the Shahadat Tasveeran Gallery at the Central Sikh Museum, portraits of Dharam Yudh Morcha and Khalistani movement figures are on-display, including of Jarnail Singh Bhindranwale. The installation of portraits Sikh militant and assassin figures in the museum has been controversial. The installation of a portrait of Manmohan Singh was opposed by some Sikhs, namely the Dal Khalsa and Balwant Singh Rajoana, as they hold his political party (Indian National Congress) as responsible for the Operation Blue Star and anti-Sikh riot incidents in 1984. Amongst its manuscripts include a pothi with the Mul Mantar written by Guru Hargobind, a Naseehat-nama manuscript, and gutkas written in Devanagari and Thai. Personal weapons and clothing items associated with Guru Hargobind, Guru Gobind Singh, Baba Deep Singh, Mehtab Singh Bhangu, Maharaja Ranjit Singh, Phula Singh, and Jean-Baptiste Ventura are present. Within its collection is a wired iron-jacket known as a sanjoe and the saranda instrument of Sham Singh.

== Structure ==
The halls of the site are as follows:

- Hall No. 1: paintings of the Sikh gurus, their family, and their associates (including guru-era martyrs and the Bhagats). A small supplementary room includes paintings based upon the murals found at Gurdwara Baba Atal Rai. Also included are glass-encased maps, such as of the udasis (travels) of Guru Nanak and of the Golden Temple complex by Mehtab Singh Naqqash. Many weapons and clothing items associated with prominent Sikh figures are displayed here.
- Hall No. 2: paintings of Sikh military and religious leaders and martyrs of the 18th century. It also contains weapons.
- Hall No. 3: paintings of Sikh Empire-era leaders and officials. Also included is a glass-vase associated with Queen Elizabeth II and historical coins.
- Hall No. 4: paintings of Sikh martyrs, militants, and musicians of the 20th century. Also there are remains of bullets and bombs used in the Operation Blue Star military operation.
- Hall No. 5: paintings of figures associated with the SGPC and SAD, Sikh military officers, and martyrs of Nankana Sahib. Also contained are musical instruments associated with historical Sikh musicians.
- Hall No. 6: paintings of religious leaders (jathedars), head granthis and managers of the Golden Temple, secretaries of the SGPC, and of Sikh artists, architects, and philanthropists. Also included are the remains of military equipment and weapons from the 18th and 20th centuries, included tear-gas from 4 July 1955.
- The site also maintains a library.

== History ==
The idea to establish a Sikh museum arose during the tenure of Tara Singh, who allocated funds for the project to be constructed at the Ghanta Ghar (Clock Tower) side of the Golden Temple complex, assigning the responsibility to Satbir Singh, who met the artist Kirpal Singh and asked him to paint works for the planned museum. The museum was established with the aim to collect, protect, propagate, and restore Sikh heritage and to counter a prevailing belief that Sikhs neglected their history. According to Satbir Singh, the idea to establish a Sikh museum was motivated by the story of Rabindranath Tagore telling a Pathan holding a paintbrush that it did not suit him and that he should hold a sword instead, the Pathan replied that he will create paintings that upon seeing it, every Pathan will reach for a sword. Another motivation was a verse found in the Guru Granth Sahib by Guru Arjan that discussed the treasures of one's ancestors contribute to the development of their descendants.

The building of the museum began in 1957. The museum was publicly opened by the Shiromani Gurdwara Parbandhak Committee in 1958, with the organisation beginning hiring Sikh artists to produce artwork for the body two years prior. Many of the paintings created for the museum are associated with the shahadat tasveeran (martyrdom images) theme. The Kar Seva baba Jhanda Singh built the first-floor of the museum at the belfry circuit, while Kar Seva baba Kharak Singh built its halls and rooms. The museum officially opened on 4–5 July 1958 with Bhan Singh as its first curator and Avtar Singh as the gallery master. Dignitaries who attended the opening ceremony included Achhar Singh (Jathedar of the Akal Takht), Giani Bhupinder Singh (Head Granti of the Golden Temple), Kirpal Singh Chak Sherewala, Sarup Singh, Satbir Singh, Nirvair Singh Dhillon, Praduman Singh Azad, and Giani Kehar Singh Vairagi. When the museum opened, it consisted of one large hall and two smaller rooms, with seventeen paintings related to figures mentioned in the Sikh ardas prayer by Kirpal Singh being initially installed in the viewing hall. Artefacts from the Sikh treasury (Toshakhana) and Akal Takht were shifted to the museum for display and other items were collected from various sources. (Note: The artefacts shifted to the museum from the Toshakhana (treasury) include: 1) The gatra (gauntlet), kanga (comb), and kamar-kasa (waist-belt) of Guru Gobind Singh 2) Sword of Maharaja Ranjit Singh used during the conquest of Kasur 3) Sword of Mehtab Singh used to behead Massa Ranghar 4) Enamel sketches made of glass dating to the Sikh Empire 5) Pearl-necklace of Maharaja Duleep Singh 6) Weaponry and shields donated by the grandsons of Fakir Aziz-ud-Din 7) 18th century war equipment and weapons and also a pistol that belonged to a French general of Maharaja Ranjit Singh that was originally kept at Gurdwara Motibagh, Patiala The artefacts shifted to the museum from the Akal Takht include: 1) A manuscript bearing the signature of Guru Hargobind 2) The chakar (quoit) of Baba Deep Singh Other items obtained were Sutar Jhangur (small-cannons), matchlock guns, bullets, and shells from Gurdwara Dhamtan Sahib, Jind, and donations from the Sikh public consisted of coins, shields, spears, and arrows. Original portraits of Sikh scholars, writers, and artists were collected. Musical instruments collected include the rabab, mardang, khartala, tabla, sitar, taus, dilruba, sarangi, and the saranda, which were displayed in glass-cases. Hukamnamas authored by Mata Gujri, Mata Sahib Devan, Mata Sundari, and Guru Gobind Singh were collected. Artwork from the Pahari (Kangra especially), Punjabi, and Kashmiri styles were collected, such as miniatures, portraiture, and embroidery. The tear-gas shells fired by police in the Golden Temple complex on 4 July 1955 were also obtained.) Artists hired to create works for the museum include Sobha Singh, Kirpal Singh, Gian Singh, S. G. Thakur Singh, G. S. Bansal, G. S. Sohan Singh, Gurdit Singh, Bodh Raj, Amar Singh, Mehar Singh, Devender Singh, Amolak Singh, Bhupinder Singh, Satpal Singh Danish, Gurvinderpal Singh, and Sukhwinder Singh.

Kirpal Singh left the museum as its painter in 1961, being replaced by Gurcharan Singh in 1963. The museum also commissioned ten paintings from Sobha Singh and eight from S. G. Thakur Singh. In 1975, the museum was expanded by the addition of three halls, with the largest hall being dedicated to the gurus and their contemporary martyrs, Hall no. 2 dedicated to 18th century figures (including Banda Bahadur), Hall no. 3 was for figures of the Sikh Misls, the Sikh Empire, and martyrs of the Akali movement, while Hall no. 4 was for portraits of Sikh personalities, Kar Seva figures, martyrs, and scholars. In 1981, the painter Gurdit Singh died and Amalok Singh replaced him as chief painter for the museum. The museum was originally a small hall but its size was expanded under jathedar Gurcharan Singh Tohra to reach the Brahm Buta (eternal tree). Tohra provided financial support to the museum.

The museum was facing crowding so plans were made to expand it but then a series of events occurred starting in 1984. Many artefacts of the museum were damaged during the 1984 Operation Blue Star and 1986 Operation Black Thunder, with fifty paintings being damaged and the pearl-necklace of Duleep Singh, the Darshani Bir of the Guru Granth Sahib, miniature paintings, and an illustrated Janamsakhi manuscript being lost in 1984. In 1987 during Operation Black Thunder, two flags related to Sahibzada Ajit Singh and a manuscript belonging to Bhai Paito Mukhe Wali were lost while some paintings and musical instruments were damaged due to bullet-fire. After the carnage, the museum was renovated and restored, with some paintings being repaired but some items were permanently lost due to the damages. In 1991, the first edition of the Album Central Sikh Museum was released by the SGPC, followed with a second edition in 1996 and another in 2013. Many of the museum's paintings were created from the early to mid-1990's. In 1991, the museum's staff had twelve members, including Avtar Singh and Jagmohan Singh, with the museum being open to the public from 8:00 a.m. to 5:00 p.m. everyday.

A portrait of Jarnail Singh Bhindranwale was installed at the museum in November 2007. Portraits of figures associated with the Dharm Yudh Morcha were hung in the museum sometime after 2007. Plans arose to shift the museum to the Akal Takht but were not realized and also the idea to display artefacts from the Sikh Toshakhana arose. In 2011, there was controversy regarding if a painting of Maharaja Ranjit Singh painted by Sobha Singh being sold by Sotheby's auction-house was the same original painting that had been kept at the Central Sikh Museum prior to its 1984 loss. However, the painting being sold may have been a replica and not the original, as the artist's signature was missing. In 2013, the museum was renovated under the leadership of its head Iqbal Singh to improve its accessibility, categorise its collection, divide the interior into sections, and provide English, Punjabi (in Gurmukhi), and Hindi captions. In around 2017, the SGPC permitted Damdami Taksal to construct a gallery dedicated to Sikh militants and pilgrims killed during Operation Blue Star. An artist actively creating paintings for the museum is Gurvinderpal Singh, who has painted over 200 works for the collection. According to Radhika Chopra, the museum's paintings are frequently removed to make room for other paintings or shifted to another wall and sometimes its captions are updated, such as when the word shaheed was added to the caption of Shabeg Singh's portrait. In around 2023, a new Interpretation Centre was constructed.

== Management ==
The museum is managed by a sub-committee of selected members, such as notable figures from Punjab, members of the SGPC, and artists and intellectuals.

== List of curators and painters ==
The past and present curators of the museum are as follows:

- Bhan Singh
- Narinder Singh Nanda
- Giani Harjeet Singh
- Mohan Singh
- Iqbal Singh (present)

The resident painters or curator artists included:

- Kirpal Singh
- Gurcharan Singh
- Gurdit Singh
- Amolak Singh
- Gurvinderpal Singh

== Gallery ==
Painting of Guru Gobind Singh seated leaning against a bolster on a terrace with a bird-of-prey, Central Sikh Museum, Pahari, circa late 18th century

Painting of Maharaja Nau Nihal Singh of Lahore, Central Sikh Museum (Kendri Sikh Ajaibghar), Amritsar, circa mid-19th century

Painting of Maharani Chand Kaur of Lahore, Central Sikh Museum (Kendri Sikh Ajaibghar), Amritsar, circa 19th century

Painting of Ran Singh, Central Sikh Museum (Kendri Sikh Ajaibghar), Amritsar, circa mid-19th century

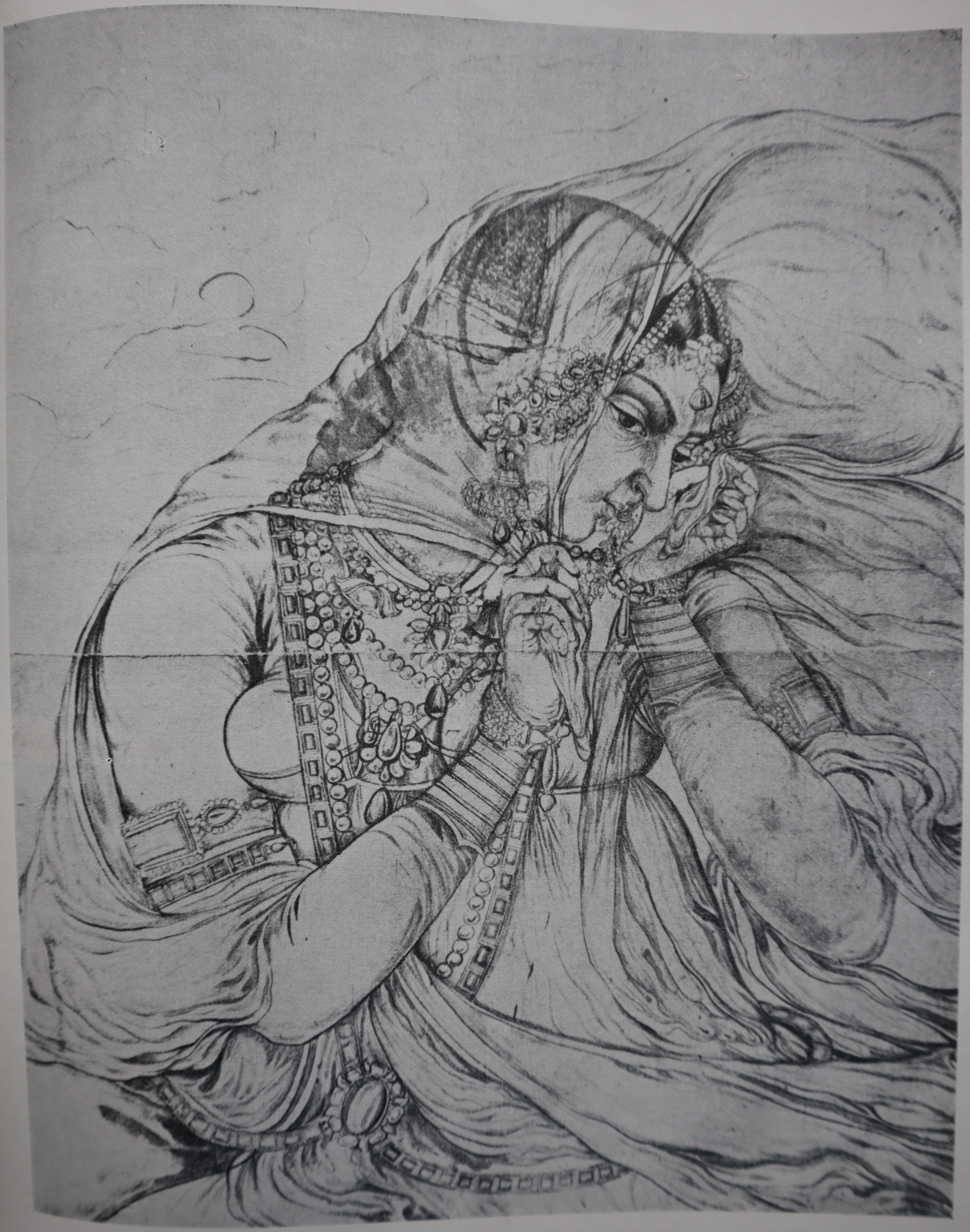
A Sketch of Sardarni Sada Kaur, by the court artist of Maharaja Ranjit Singh, Kehar Singh. Kept in the collection of the Central Sikh Museum, Amritsar.

Map of the Golden Temple complex, Central Sikh Museum, Amritsar, Punjab (older map)

Map of the Golden Temple complex, Central Sikh Museum, Amritsar, Punjab (newer map)
