= Baba Baghel Singh Sikh Heritage Multimedia Museum =

Sikh museum in New Delhi, India

Coordinates: 28°37′34″N 77°12′33″E

- Former name: Baba Baghel Singh Museum
- Established: July 26, 2014
- Location: Gurdwara Bangla Sahib, Ashoka Road, Hanuman Road area, Connaught Place, New Delhi, India
- Type: Sikh museum
- Founder: Vikramjit Singh Sahney
- Owner: Delhi Sikh Gurdwara Management Committee
- Website: sikhheritagemuseum.net

The Baba Baghel Singh Sikh Heritage Multimedia Museum (BBSSHMM) is a Sikh museum associated with Gurdwara Bangla Sahib located in New Delhi, India. It is associated with the Delhi Sikh Gurdwara Management Committee. It is located near Ashoka Road gate and the Patel Chowk metro-station and is open from 9:30 a.m. to 7:30 p.m. on all days, with maintenance between 1 p.m. to 2:30 p.m.

== Etymology ==
The museum is named after Baghel Singh, whose forces conquered the Red Fort of Delhi in 1783 and founded seven gurdwaras in the city.

== History ==
A Baba Baghel Singh Museum had been founded earlier, as noted by a 1998 publication. According to Kanika Singh, the museum was first established in the 1970s and was re-opened in 2014. The museum was re-established as a multimedia museum in 2014 by Vikramjit Singh Sahney (International President of the World Punjabi Organisation and head of the Sun Foundation). Vikramjit re-established the museum in the memory of his father Gurcharan Singh Sahney for the purpose of educating the Sikh community on the religion's history.

The renovated museum officially opened on 26 July 2014. Individuals involved in the museum's construction include Bobby Bedi, Navtej Singh Sarna, H. S. Chawla, Atinder Oberoi, Shammi Narang, Brigadier G. Singh, Harish Oberoi, and Gurcharan Singh Sandhu. Persons who attended the inauguration include Vikramjit Singh Sahni, Manjit Singh, Arun Jaitley, Manjinder Singh Sirsa, and Harsimrat Kaur Badal among others, which incorporated a bhog prayer Gurdwara Bangla Sahib and the presentation of siropas (robe of honour).

== Collection and site ==
The museum has a collection of paintings, murals, and artefacts in an auditorium and incorporates digital technology, displays, mural projections, documentaries, and audio recordings with multilingual sound in English, Punjabi, and Hindi. The paintings depict the Sikh gurus, their associates, and other Sikh figures, such as historical generals but also of Sikh symbols (Khanda), rites, and ceremonies (Anand Karaj and Laavan). The museum holds forty paintings and murals, with the painting of portrait of Baghel Singh starting the display at the beginning and another of his conquest of Delhi in 1783. The museum holds twenty-one paintings by Kirpal Singh.

The theatre of the site can accommodate 170 persons and its four galleries has space for 250 persons. The auditorium, which is 3D, can accommodate 150 visitors. Publications by the museum are also written in Telugu, Kannada, French, Italian, and Russian. The museum incorporates digitisation. Art-pieces in the museum have a reference-board that explains it. The museum provides an MP3 player to visitors to listen to text-recordings accompanying its display.

== Management ==
The museum is a collaboration between the Sun Foundation and the Delhi Sikh Gurudwara Prabandhak Committee. Some key persons include Surjeet Singh Azad and Anita Oberoi. Meher Kaur serves as the museum surveyor.

== Visitors ==
The museum received 1,200 visitors daily, with it being especially crowded on weekends. In 2016, the museum reported eight lakh visitors since its re-opening. In 2021, the museum celebrated 20 lakh visitors (2,000,000).
