= Bhai Subeg Singh =

18th-century Sikh martyr

Personal life
- Born: Jambar, Lahore Subah, Mughal Empire
- Died: 1745 Lahore, Lahore Subah, Mughal Empire
- Cause of death: Breaking wheel
- Children: Bhai Shahbaz Singh

Religious life
- Religion: Sikhism

Bhai Subeg Singh was an 18th-century Sikh Martyr who served as a contractor and kotwal (castellan) for the Mughal Empire. Bhai Subeg Singh helped with peace negotiations between the Sikhs and Mughal government in 1733. Bhai Subeg Singh, along with his son, Bhai Shahbaz Singh, were both executed by the Mughal Government in 1745 when they refused to convert to Islam. He is remembered by Sikhs as one of their notable martyrs of the 18th century.

== Early life/Career ==
Bhai Subeg Singh was born in the village of Jambar in Lahore province to a Sikh family of a Jat background. He had a son by the name of Shahbaz Singh. Bhai Subeg Singh was well versed in Persian and Arabic, and as a result, he became a contractor for the Mughal Government. In 1726, Zakriya Khan was appointed the Mughal Governor of Lahore. Zakriya Khan began a policy of persecution against the Sikh community. Khan began issuing bounties and rewards on the Sikhs, and sent his moving military columns in an effort to suppress the community. Between 1726 and 1733, Zakriya Khan struggled in suppressing the Sikh community, and by March 1733, Khan decided to make peace with the Sikhs. Zakriya Khan sent Bhai Subeg Singh in order to negotiate with the Sikhs at Amritsar. The Mughals agreed to lift all persecution measures against the Sikhs, agreed to give them a jagir (fief), and give the title of "Nawab" to their most influential leader. Kapur Singh agreed to accept the title of Nawab and was given the name Nawab Kapur Singh. However, Hari Ram Gupta claims that the negotiations between the Sikhs and Mughals occurred in the Shivalik Hills and not Amritsar. He further states that Bhai Subeg Singh was never sent by Zakriya Khan to negotiate with the Sikhs, as it was impossible for the Mughal government to give contracts to the Sikhs at the time. Bhai Subeg Singh was later appointed as a Kotwal by the Mughal government. Subeg Singh was sympathetic towards his Sikh brethren and would cremate the remains of Sikhs who were executed by the Mughal Government.

== Martyrdom ==
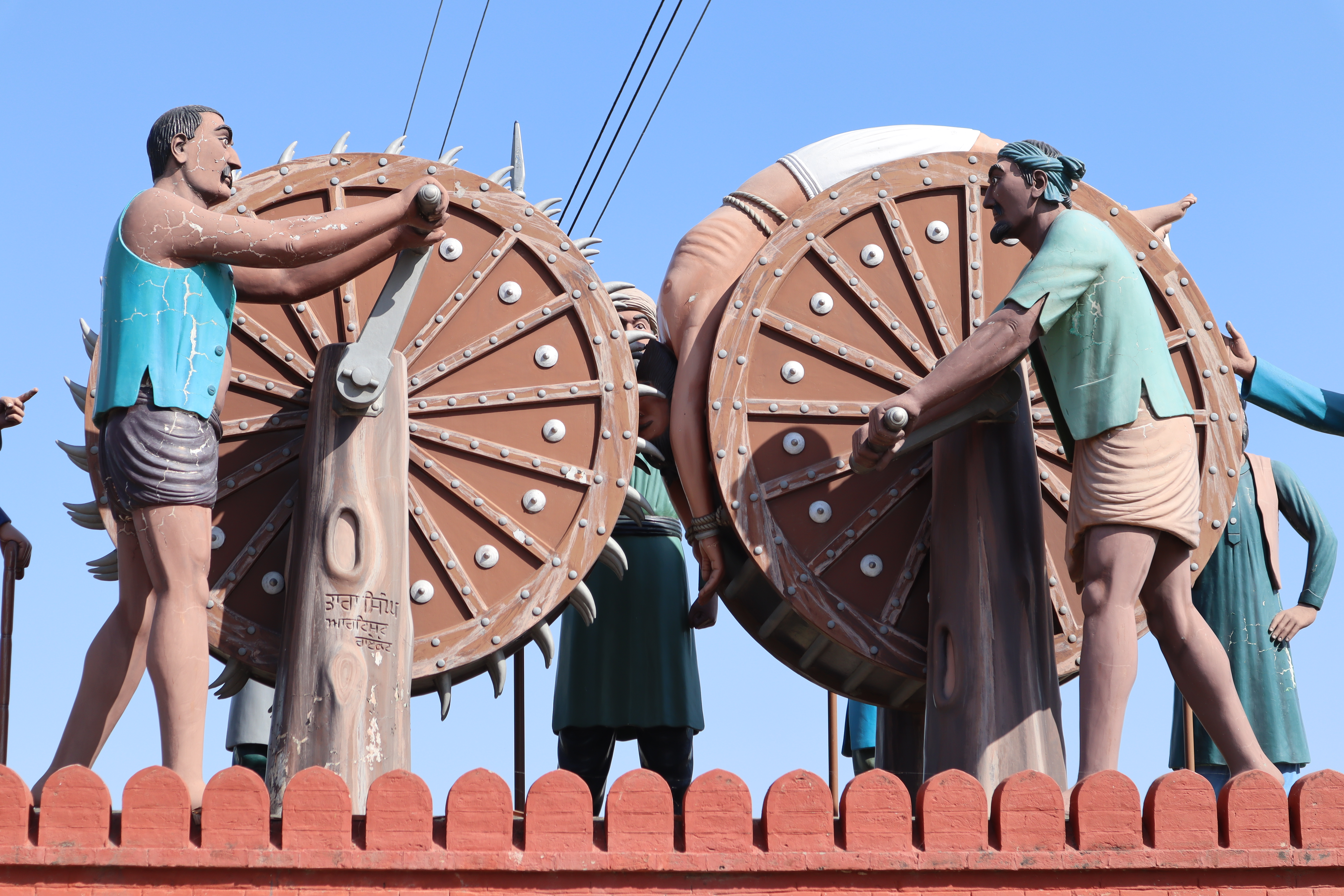
Shahbaz Singh being executed via the Charkhari (spiked breaking wheel)

Bhai Shahbaz Singh was educated by a Muslim teacher and was taught the Persian and Arabic languages. His teachers openly condemned and criticized Sikhism which resulted in Bhai Shahbaz Singh criticizing Islam and defending Sikhism. His teachers also attempted at persuading Bhai Shahbaz Singh in converting to Islam, to which he refused. Soon a legal complaint was sent to the Qazi in Lahore against Bhai Shahbaz Singh. Bhai Subeg Singh was also accused of hurting Islamic sentiments and was also arrested. Both Bhai Subeg Singh and Bhai Shahbaz Singh were given the option of converting to Islam or execution.Both of them refused to leave their faith and accepted execution. Both of them were executed using a breaking wheel in the year 1745. According to Hari Ram Gupta, Bhai Subeg Singh and Bhai Shahbaz Singh were executed during the reign of Zakriya Khan, whereas The Encyclopedia of Sikhism claims they were executed under the reign of Yahya Khan, who was the eldest son of Zakriya Khan.

== In popular culture ==
A movie based on the lives of Bhai Subeg Singh and Bhai Shahbaz Singh was released by the company Vismaad in the year 2012.

== Gallery ==
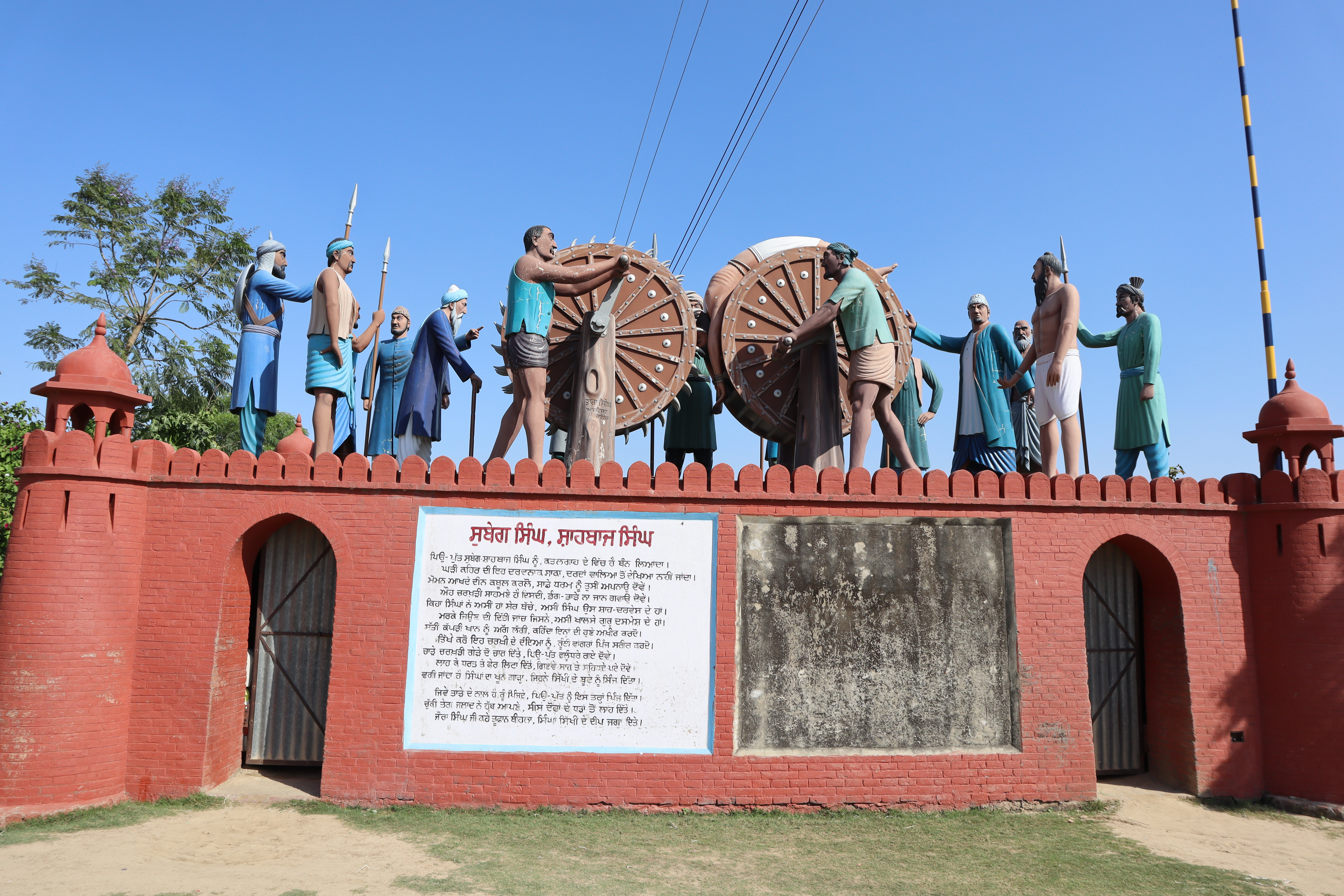
Diorama sculptural monument of the torture and execution of Bhai Subeg Singh and Bhai Shahbaz Singh at Gurdwara Mehdiana Sahib, Mehdiana, Ludhiana district, Punjab, India, 9 April 2023

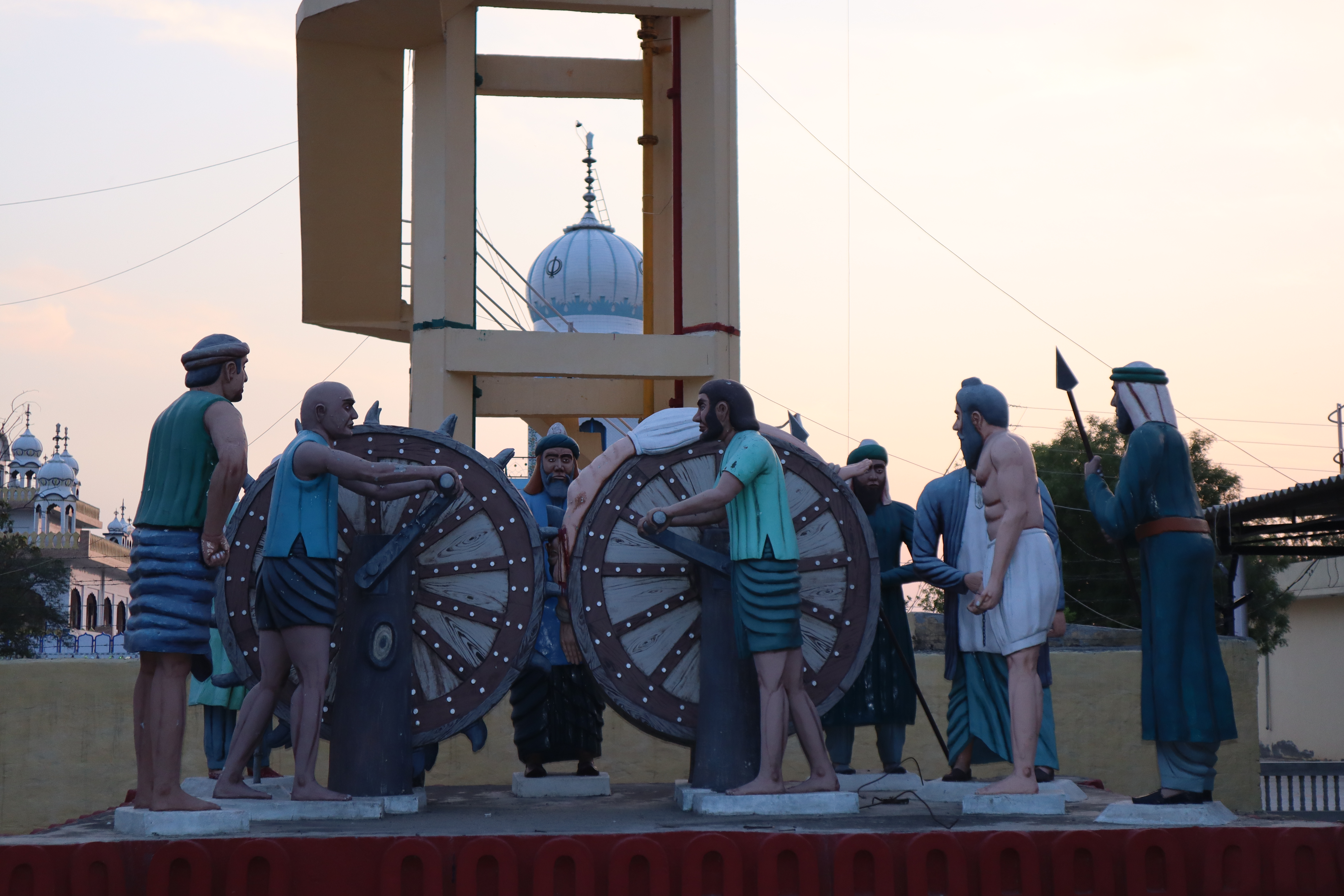
Diorama sculptural monument of the torture and execution of Bhai Subeg Singh and Bhai Shahbaz Singh at Gurdwara Shaheed Baba Tega Singh Ji, Chand Purana, Bagha Purana tehsil, Moga district, Punjab, India, April 2023

== See also ==
- Martyrdom in Sikhism
- Bhai Taru Singh
- Bhai Mani Singh

== Bibliography ==
- Gupta, Hari (2007). History of the Sikhs Vol. II Evolution of Sikh Confederacies (1707-69) (3rd ed.). New Delhi: Munshiram Manoharlal Publishers Pvt. Ltd. ISBN 978-81-215-0248-1.
- Singh, Ganda (1990). Sardar Jassa Singh Ahluwalia. Publication Bureau, Punjabi University, Patiala.
- Singh, Harbans (2004). The Encyclopedia of Sikhism Volume IV S-Z (2nd ed.). Punjabi University, Patiala. ISBN 81-7380-530-X.
