= Devender Singh =

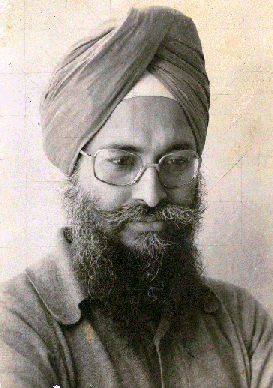
- Devender Singh
- Born: 6 November 1947 (age 78); Delhi, Punjab, India
- Known for: Painting
- Website: www.devendersinghartist.com

Devender Singh (born 6 November 1947) is a contemporary Indian artist (painter) from Punjab.

== Early life ==
Singh was born on 6 November 1947 in Amritsar, Punjab. His father, Sewak Singh (G.D. Art Lahore), was a well-known artist himself.

== Education and training ==
He received his formal education at Mumbai, Ludhiana and Chandigarh.

== Painting ==
His well-known paintings include the series made on Bara Maha. Singh started his career with illustrations made for the very famous Amar Chitra Katha comics. His Sikh historical paintings are well known among Punjabis throughout the world.
