= Bir-asan =

Bir-asan is a traditional Sikh bodily-pose. It is regarded as a heroic posture amongst Sikhs and symbolizes martial preparedness (Tyar bar Tyar). According to the Sikh Rehat Maryada of the SGPC, the pose consists of holding the left-knee upright and keeping the right-knee on the ground. However, the Taksalis on the other hand practice having their left-knee down and the right-knee upright as the bir-asan pose, a reversal of the form outlined in the Sikh Rehat Maryada. According to W. H. McLeod, the body weight is kept on the right-foot, if the version of the pose has the right-knee being down and the left-knee held upwards.

According to 20th century Sikh writers, such as Kapur Singh's Pārāśarapraśna: The Baisakhi of Guru Gobind Singh, this pose is the one in-which the inaugural quintet of Panj Piare held when they underwent the Pahul ceremony from Guru Gobind Singh. As per Kapur Singh, the pose is well-suited for archery. Nikky-Guninder Kaur Singh states that the pose does not have only martial or aggressive meanings but also is a sign of humility and esteem, related to having one-knee on the ground and criticizes "macho" interpretations of the pose that miss the deferential meanings of it.

Those undergoing the Amrit Sanchar baptismal ceremony should be seated in the bir-asan pose when kneeling before the Panj Piare quintet administering the amrit, with the initiate's right-hand cupped into their left-one whilst chanting the Japji.

== Etymology ==
The word "bir", meaning "hero", is related to the word "vir", meaning "virile".

== See also ==
- Asana
