= Gurdwara Mehdiana Sahib =

Gurdwara in Punjab, India

Gurudwara Mehdiana Sahib
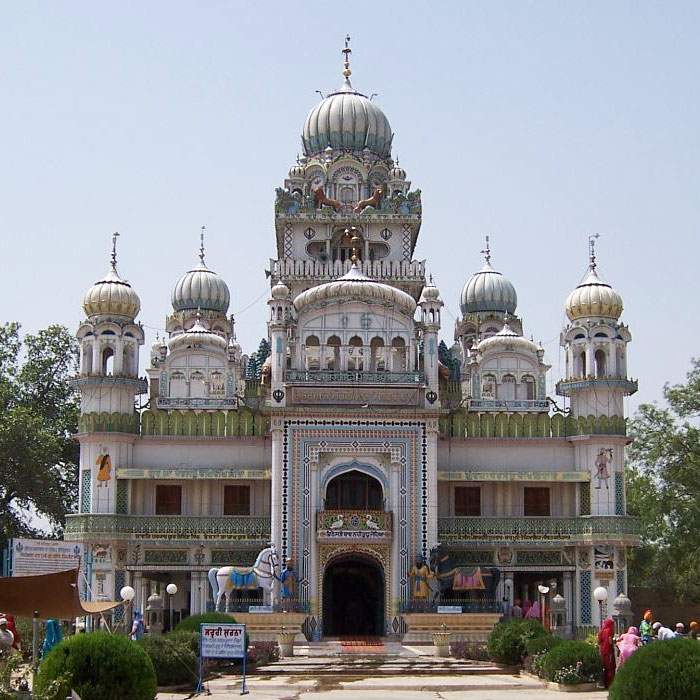
- Gurdwara Mehdiana Sahib

Religion
- Affiliation: Sikhism
- District: Ludhiana

Location
- Location: Mehdiana
- State: Punjab
- Country: India
- Interactive map of Gurudwara Mehdiana Sahib

Architecture
- Type: Gurdwara
- Style: Sikh architecture

Gurdwara Mehdiana Sahib, also called the 'School of Sikh History' is a Sikh gurdwara located in the village of Mehdiana, just outside Mallha, near Jagraon in Ludhiana district, India.

Sikhs believe the site of the gurdwara to be where Guru Gobind Singh and his followers rested after the Battle of Chamkaur against the Imperial Mughal armies of Aurangzeb and where he was requested by his followers or the Sangat to write the Zafarnamah.

The gurdwara is known for its Meenakari ornamentation and monuments depicting important events in Sikh history. Additionally, the Dhaab (natural water reservoir), greenery, birds and trees made Mehdiana Sahib popular with pilgrims. Today parts of the Gurdwara have become dilapidated due to a lack of funds resulting from its isolated location and private ownership status.

== History ==
=== Background ===
In 1705 Mughal armies under Aurangzeb laid siege to Anandpur Sahib intent on reducing the influence of Guru Gobind Singh and the Khalsa. During the siege Aurangzeb sent a signed letter to Guru Gobind Singh offering safe passage out of Anandpur. Pressed by his followers and family he accepted and evacuated Anandpur on 20–21 December 1705.

Guru Gobind Singh, his two eldest sons (Sahibzada Jujhar Singh and Sahibzada Ajit Singh) and thirty-eight followers arrived at Chamkaur, where they were granted shelter. Despite assurance from Aurangzeb of safe passage a contingent of the imperial army was sent to lay siege to the haveli. Vastly outnumbered Guru Gobind Singh was disguised as another Sikh and escaped with only three others including Bhai Daya Singh and Bhai Dharam Singh.

Guru Gobind Singh reached Mehdiana after gathering support from across the Malwa region passing through the villages of Raikot, Lamme Jattpure & Manuke before finally reaching Mehdiana. The nearest habitation at the time was almost 3 miles (4.8 km) away so Guru Gobind Singh and his followers rested by cleaned their teeth using tree twigs (Daatan) and bathed in the water (Daab). While Guru Gobind Singh was meditating Bhai Daya Singh asked what they should do next. Guru Gobind Singh's reply encouraged his followers to have faith in God's will as they had done no wrong.

"Bhai Daya Singh I have returned the Debt and have become victorious. Singh and Tiger are kings of the same jungle. Singhs should keep faith in the Almighty."

Still distressed Bhai Daya Singh again repeated his requested, on behalf of all Sikhs (Sangat). Guru Gobind Singh's reply showed that despite being Guru to the Sikhs Guru Gobind Singh was only a mortal man and that in reality he was a servant to God and the Sangat. The quote refers to the execution Guru Gobind Singh's father and proceeding Sikh Guru Tegh Bahadur for opposing forced conversion to Islam of Kashmiris by Aurangzeb

"Sangat is bigger than Guru. [Sangat] Sent father to Delhi on Kashmiri Pandits plea. [Then] On Sangat's request [I] left Anandpur Sahib, [I] left Chamkaur Garhi on Sangat's request, [And] now you are asking me on Sangat's behalf."

Discussions about the future of the Sikhs continued until on Sangat's request Guru Gobind Singh began to prepare his mind to begin writing the Zafarnamah. Guru Gobind Singh went to the village Chakkar that night and the next day travelled to Deena Sahib to stay with Lakhmir and Shamir; after gathering support at the villages Takhtupura and Madhe. In Chakkar he wrote the Zafarnamah and sent it to Aurangzeb in Aurangabad with Bhai Daya Singh and Bhai Dharam Das.

For this reason pilgrims claim that Mehdiana Sahib has Guru Gobind Singh's blessing and that visiting will mean their prayers will not go unanswered.

=== Construction ===
Before the late 1960s the Mehdiana complex looked like a forest with dense trees and bushes growing all around the place of worship. The gurdwara was not developed and maintained properly and there was no habitation within a distance of two to three miles (5 km). Later Jathedar Jora Singh Lakha took the responsibility for its development and made Mehdiana Sahib a popular destination for pilgrims. In 1972, when Lakha started the work, only a few acres were attached to the gurdwara but slowly the gurdwara complex covered 25 acres (100,000 m^{2}). The art pieces statue constructed in the Gurudwara was made by the Great sculpture artist " Tara Singh Ji " Which are the center of attraction of the Gurudwara Sahib ji

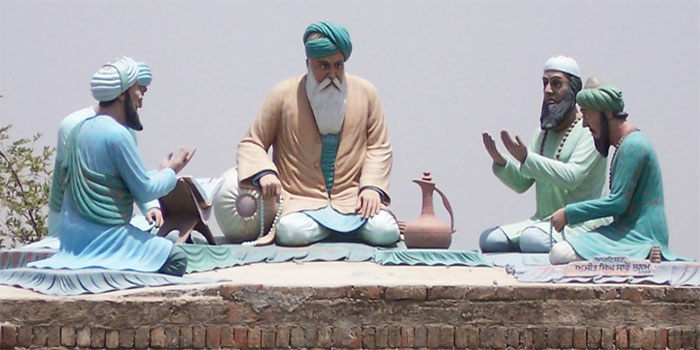
Sculpture of Mian Mir and his followers at Mehdiana Sahib

In the vicinity of this gurdwara are the sculptures and statues of Sikh warriors who not only laid their lives for the sake of the religion but also endured torture at the hands of the Mughals. These statues depict soldiers, women and children being cut to pieces. Some sculptures show Bhai Kanhaiya, one of the soldiers of Guru Gobind Singh, serving water not only to the wounded soldiers in their own army but also to wounded enemy soldiers. Through these sculptures Lakha not only aimed to depict history but also to educate people that religion was more important than their lives. He felt it was better to sacrifice one's life than to accept injustice and cruelty and lose one's self-respect.

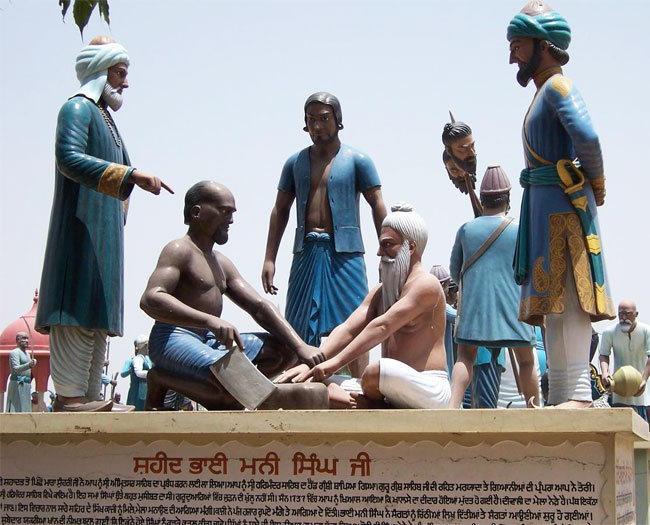
Sculpture of Shaheed Bhai Mani Singh being executed by dismemberment at Mehdiana Sahib

He has tried to show that the Sikh religion was born from the sacrifices of our ancestors and that religion should not be taken for granted. The importance of preserving one's self-respect and the triumph of good over evil have been beautifully depicted in the sculptures and paintings. Twenty paintings by the Sikh artist Kirpal Singh are housed at the site.

The gurdwara complex has its own Dasmesh Public School.

== Gallery ==
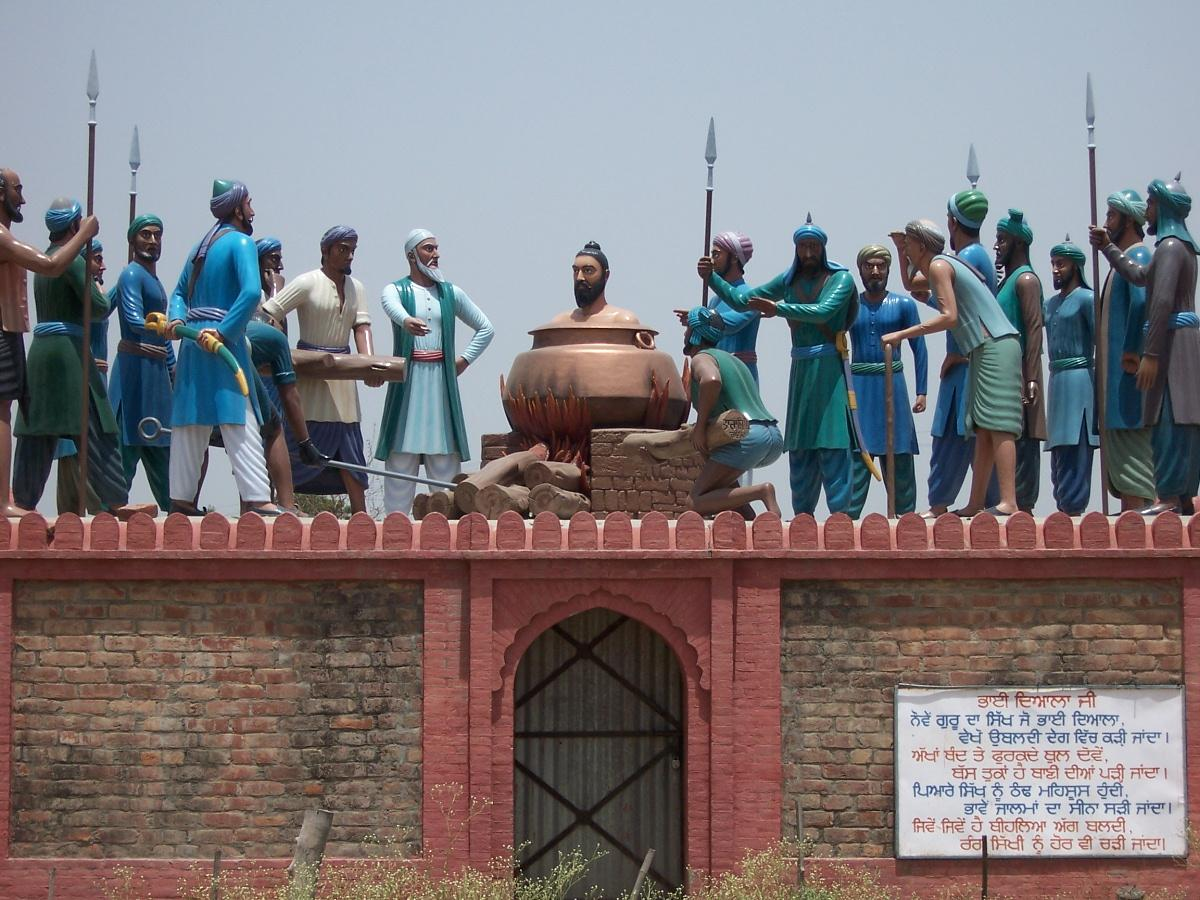
Sculpture of the execution of Bhai Dayala by being boiled alive at Mehdiana Sahib

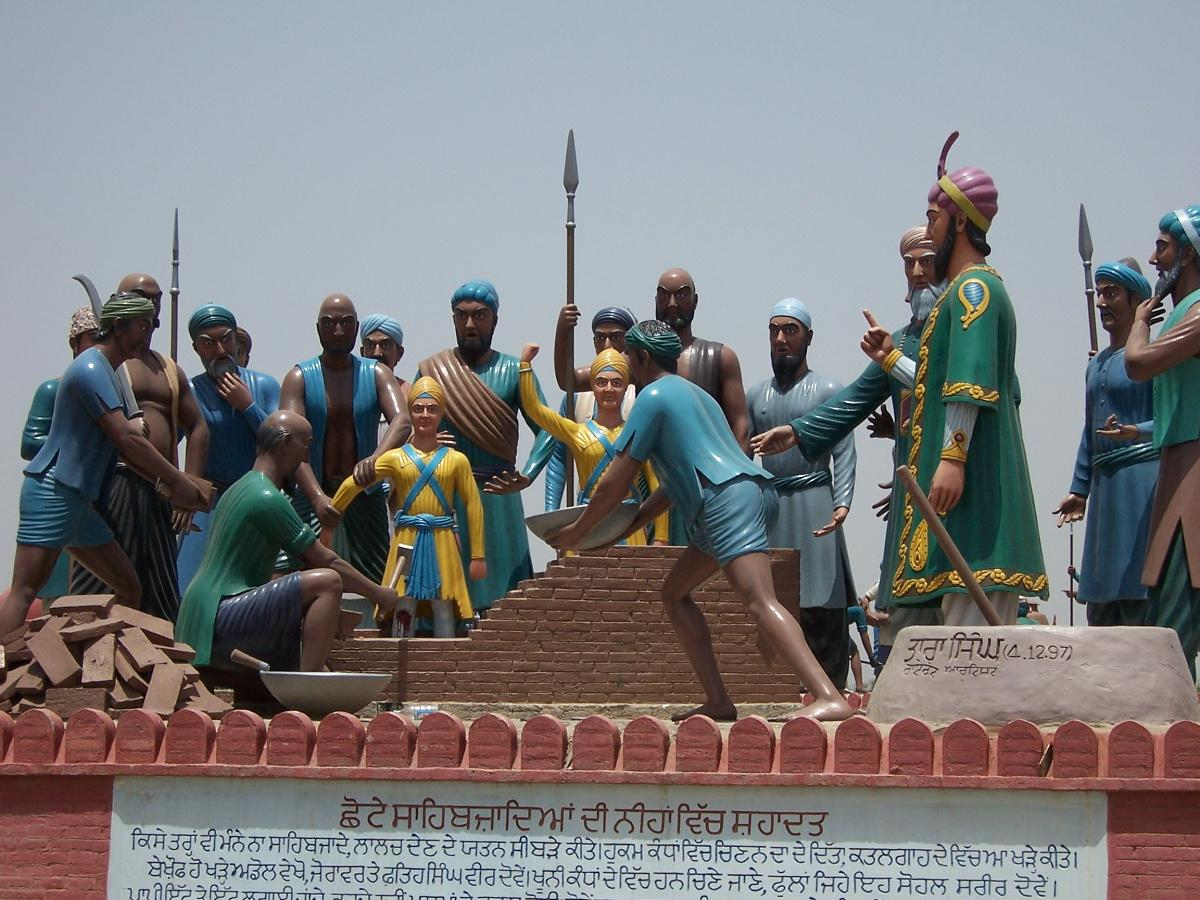
Sculpture at Mehdiana Sahib of the execution of Sahibzada Zorawar Singh and Sahibzada Fateh Singh by being bricked alive (Saka sirhind) by Nawab Wazir Khan of Sirhind at Fatehgarh Sahib

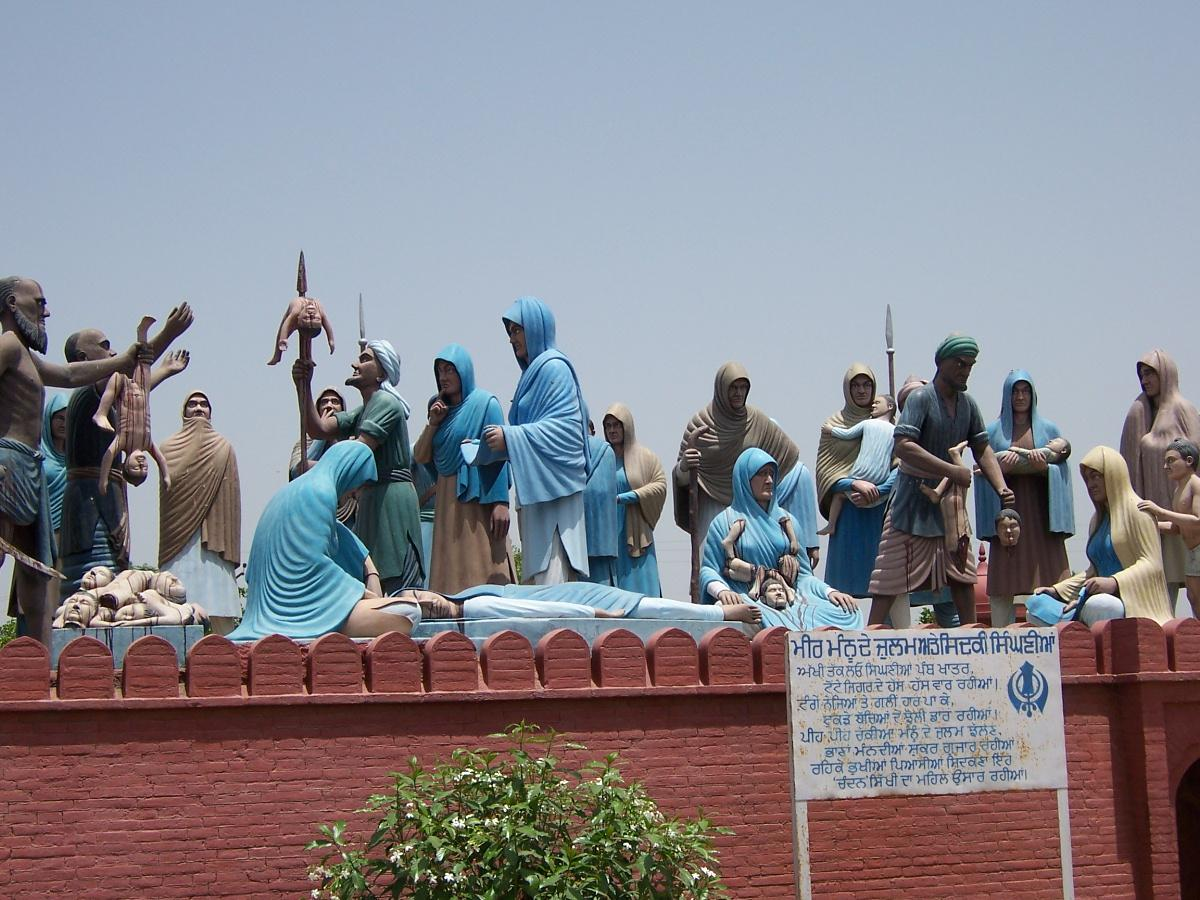
Enslavement, torture, and execution of Sikh women and children during the governorship of Mir Mannu

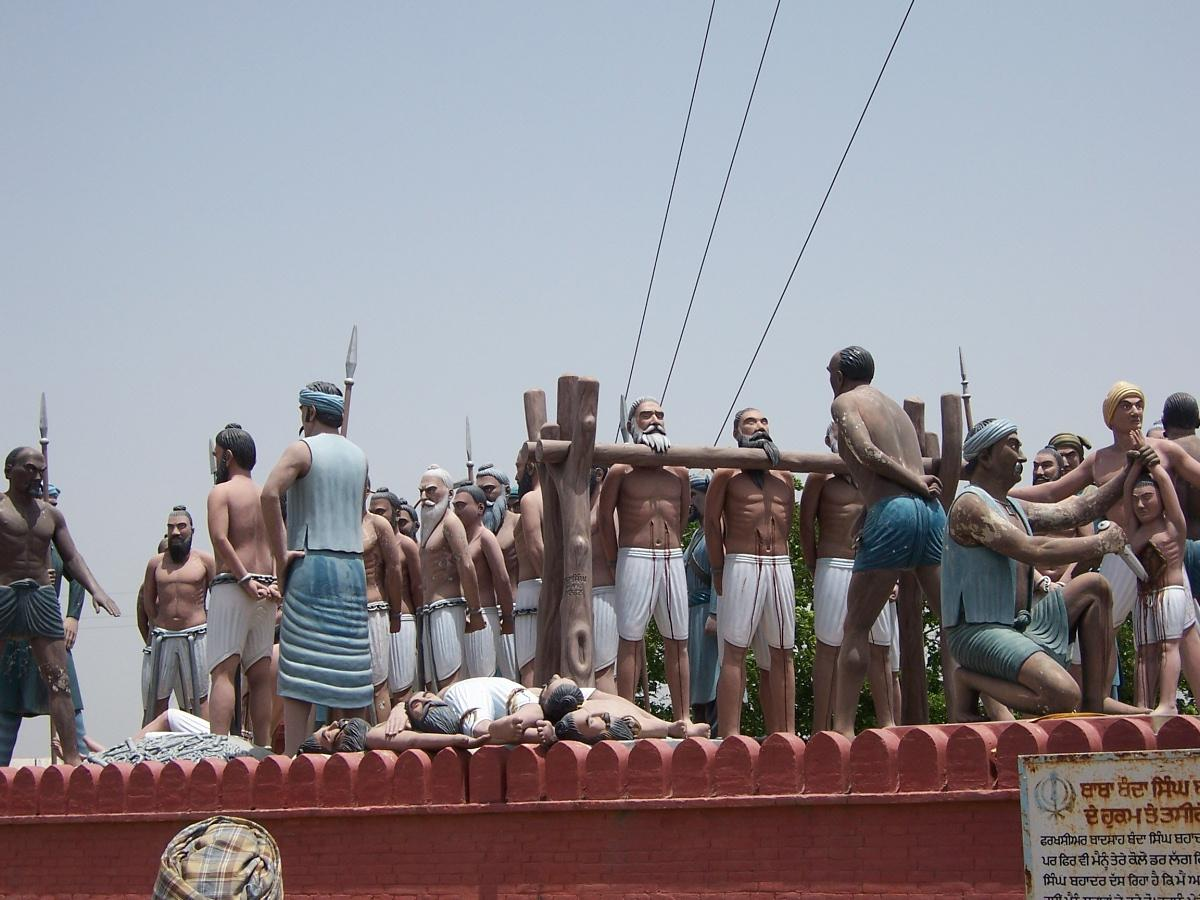
Sculpture of a mass Sikh execution

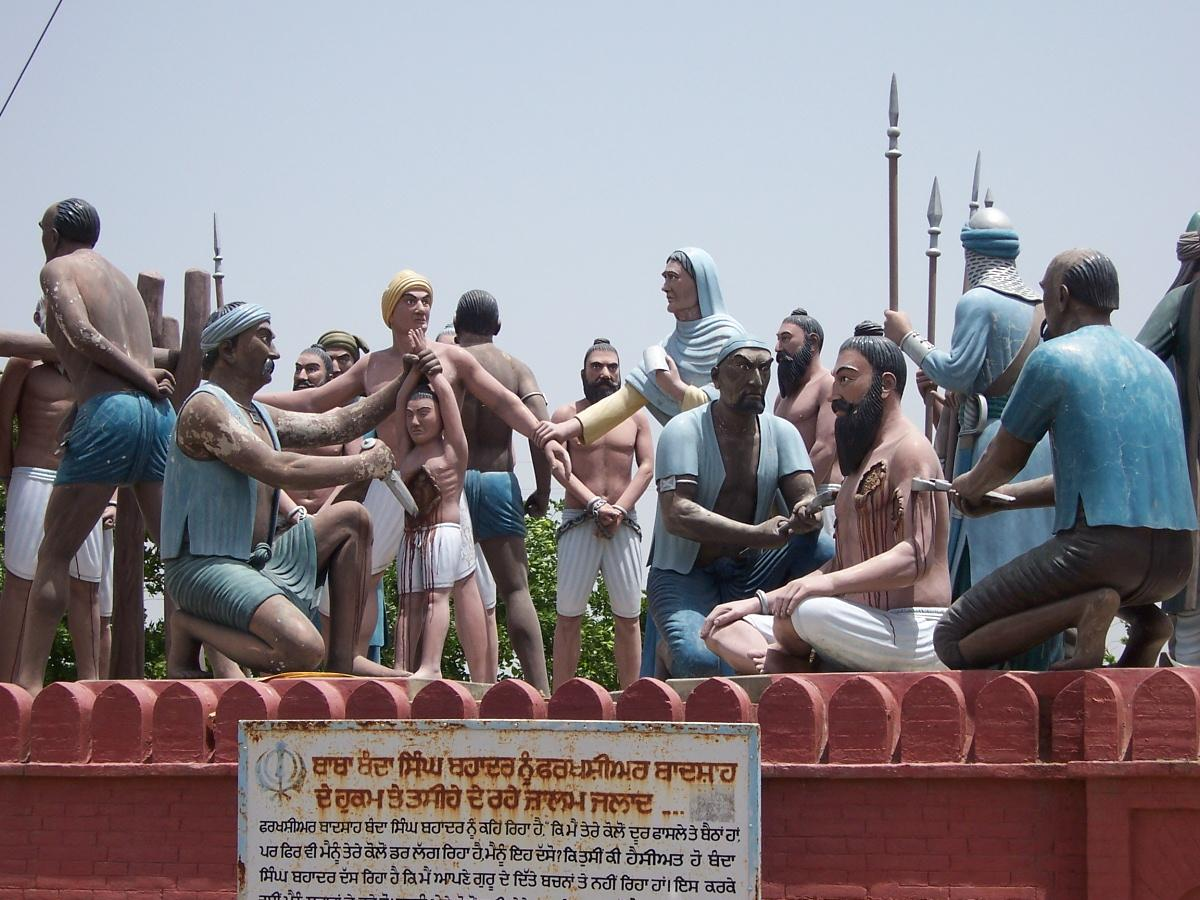
Sculpture of the execution of Banda Singh Bahadur at Mehdiana Sahib

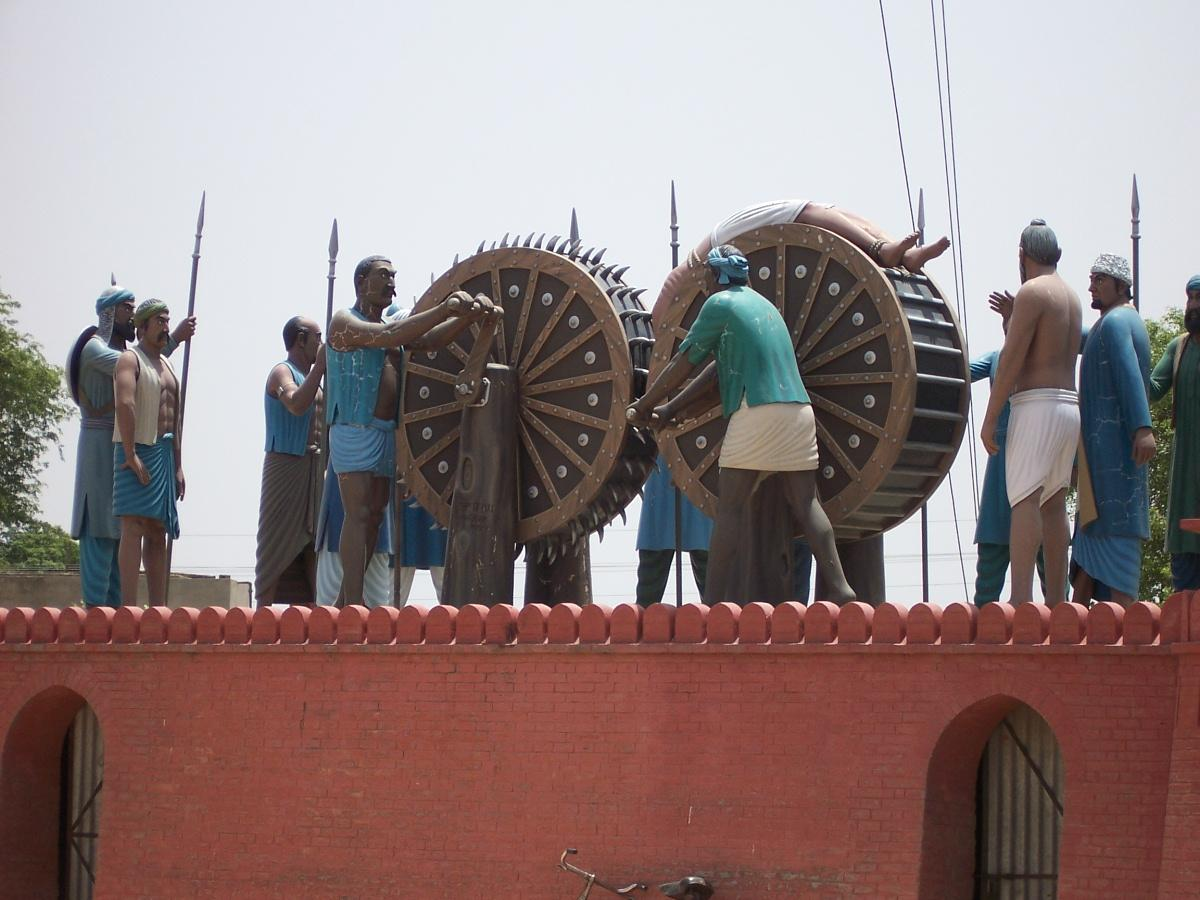
Sculpture of the execution of Subeg Singh and Shahbaz Singh on a death wheel (charkhari) at Mehdiana Sahib

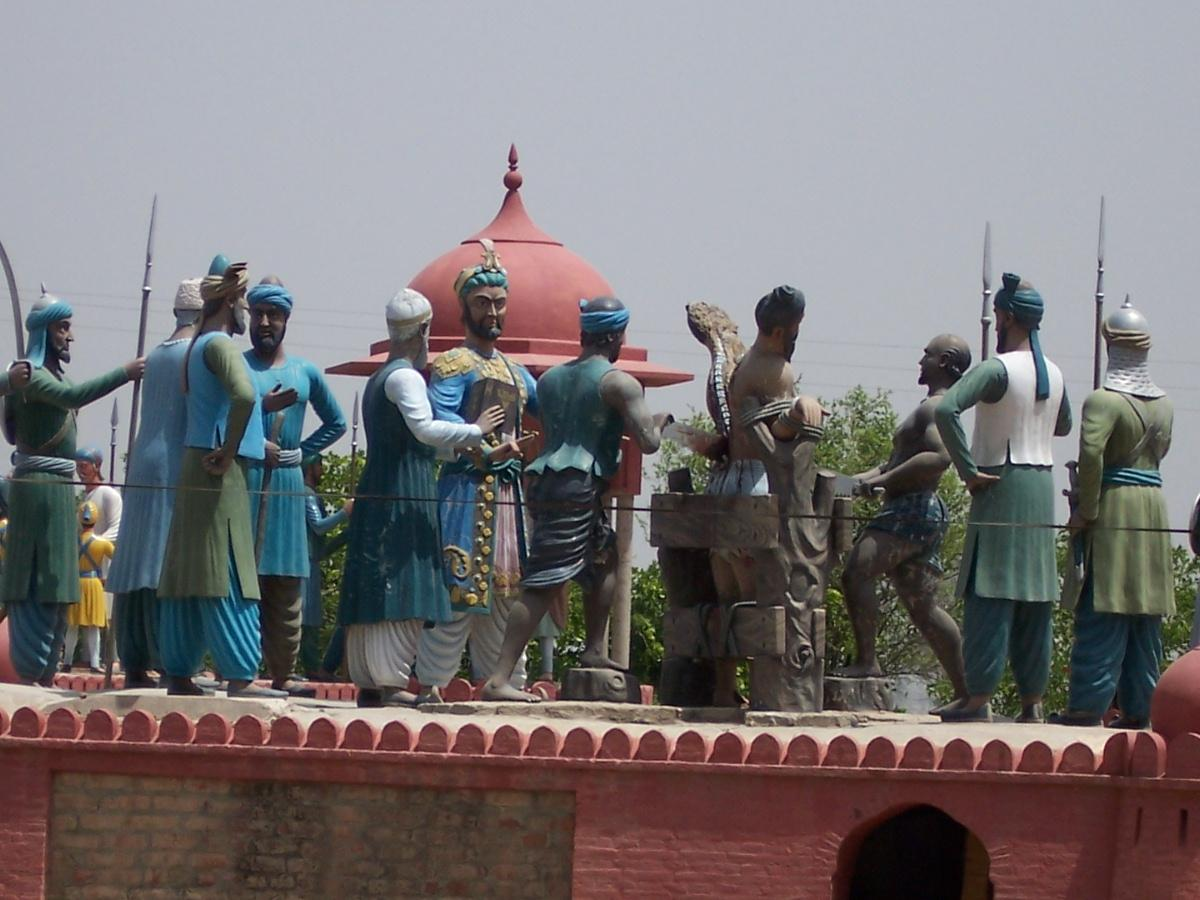
Sculpture of the execution of Bhai Mati Das by being sawn in half at Mehdiana Sahib

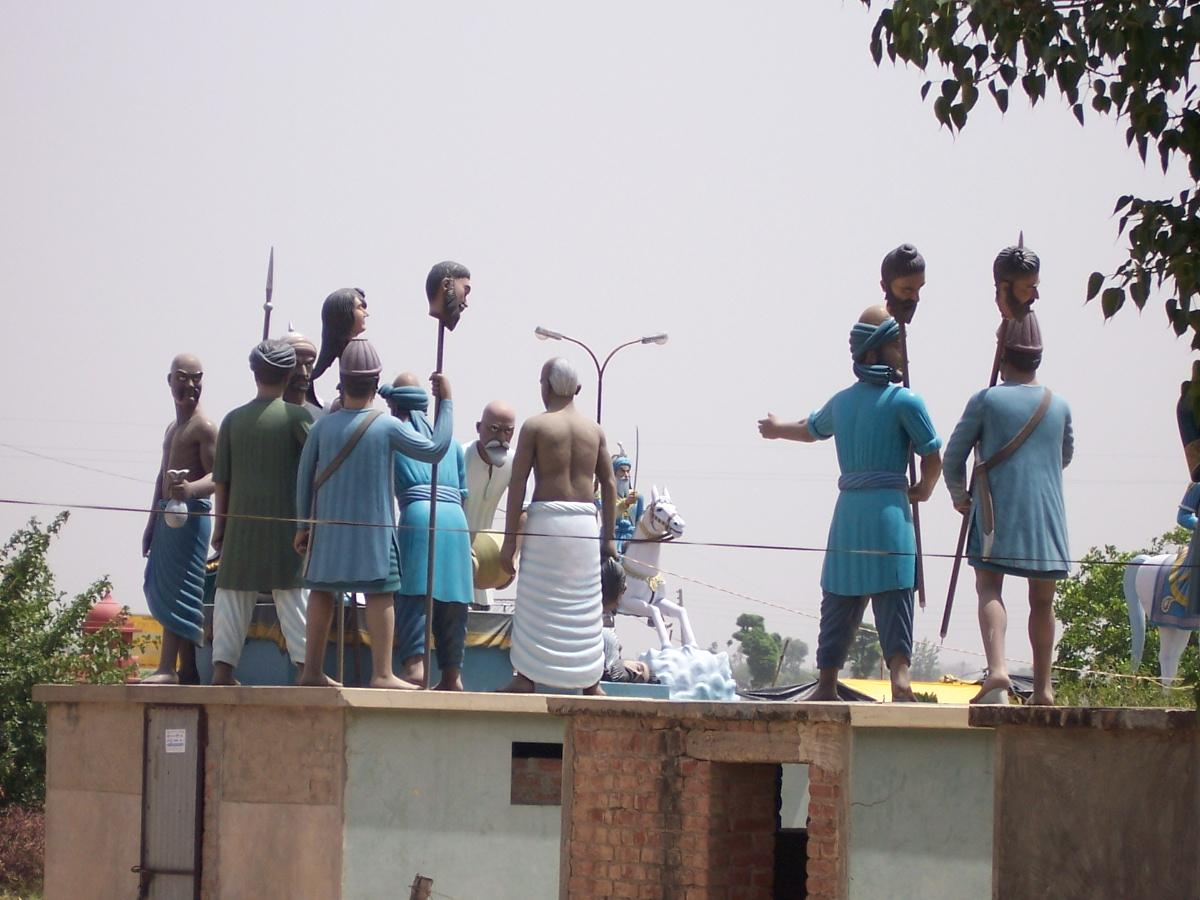
Sculpture of the collection of 5 rupee rewards for delivering Sikh heads to village elders

== See also ==
- Sikh Ajaibghar
- History of Sikhism
- Sikh architecture
- Sikh art and culture
