= Chakkar =

Chakkar चक्कर
- Village development committee
- Location in Nepal
- Coordinates: 26.71°N 86.04°E
- Country: Nepal
- Zone: Janakpur Zone
- District: Dhanusa District

Population (1991)
  - Total: 4,419
- Time zone: UTC+5:45 (Nepal Time)

Chakkar is a village development committee in Dhanusa District in the Janakpur Zone of south-eastern Nepal. At the time of the 1991 Nepal census it had a population of 4,419 persons living in 799 individual households.
