= Anglo-Sikh War Memorial =

- Government of Punjab, India
- War memorial and museum at Ferozeshah
- For Sikh soldiers of the First and Second Anglo-Sikh Wars
- Unveiled: April 1976
- Location: 30°51′46″N 74°49′00″E; Ferozeshah, Firozpur district, Punjab, India near Firozpur
- Designed by: Harbinder Singh Chopra

The Anglo-Sikh War Memorial is a war-museum dedicated to the Anglo-Sikh wars located off of Moga Road in Ferozeshah, Firozpur district, Punjab, India. The memorial was built by the Punjab government to honor the soldiers who died fighting against British army at Chillianwala on 13 January 1849; Sabhraon on 10 February 1846; Mudki on 18 December 1845; and Ferozeshah on 21–22 December 1845.

== Construction ==
The project to construct the site began in 1972 under the aegis of M. S. Randhawa. Harbinder Singh Chopra, the senior architect of Punjab Agricultural University, Ludhiana, designed the three-storeyed memorial near Sirhind Feeder and on the banks of Rajasthan Canal of Ferozepur. H. S. Chopra was guided by M. S. Randhawa, who was then the Vice Chancellor of the Ferozeshah Memorial Committee formulated by the Punjab government. The landscape design of the memorial was done by Hari Singh Sandhu, the then Xen Horticulture of Punjab Agricultural University. The foundation of the site was placed by Chief Minister Giani Zail Singh on 11 February 1973. The artist Kirpal Singh was hired to paint works depicting the battles of Mudki, Ferozeshah, Sabraon, and Chillianwala for the site, with these paintings being some of the largest ever created in India, measuring 10' x 20'. It took Kirpal three years to finish the task, with him also preparing portraits of General Gough, Sham Singh Attariwala, and Tej Singh. The memorial was unveiled publicly in April 1976 with high-ranking Indian military officials in attendance.

== Memorial ==
The memorial is in a plot of 2 hectares where one of the Anglo-Sikh wars happened. The ground floor of the memorial is 2 meters above the surrounding area. The monument has collections of murals, portraits, and paintings depicting battlefield made by renowned painters Jaswant Singh and Kirpal Singh. The bronze carved quotes on Cunningham's history; the wars of Shah Mohammad; the Anglo-Sikh war weapons donated by the Punjab government from the Patiyala Museum, is displayed in the memorial. The site houses eleven works by the Sikh artist Kirpal Singh.
