= History of Sikhism =

Guru Nanak founded the Sikh religion in the Punjab region of the northern part of the Indian subcontinent in the 15th century and opposed many traditional practices like fasting, Upanayana, idolatry, caste system, ascetism, azan, economic materialism, and gender discrimination.

Guru Gobind Singh, tenth of the ten Sikh Gurus, founded the Khalsa panth in the Punjab region of the northern part of the Indian subcontinent in the end of seventeenth century. He baptised five Sikh people from different parts of India, with different social backgrounds, to form the Khalsa. Those five Beloved Ones, the Pañj Piārē, then baptised him into the Khalsa fold. This gives the order of Khalsa a history of around 500 years. Historical theory and analysis suggests that Sikhism came into existence during the early medieval period of the Bhakti movement and also after repeated invasions by Muslim rulers upon the Hindu community during Mughal rule, which lasted between (1526–1857 AD) especially in the region of North India.

The history of the Sikh faith is closely associated with the history of Punjab and the socio-political situation in the north-west of the Indian subcontinent during the 17th century. From the rule of India by the Mughal Emperor Jahangir (r. 1605–1627), Sikhism came into conflict with Mughal laws, because they were affecting political successions of Mughals while cherishing Sufi saints from Islam. Mughal rulers killed many prominent Sikhs for refusing to obey their orders, and for opposing the persecution of Sikhs. Of the ten Sikh gurus, two, Guru Arjan and Guru Tegh Bahadur, were tortured and executed, and close kin of several gurus (such as the seven and nine-year old sons of Guru Gobind Singh), were brutally killed, along with numerous other main revered figures of Sikhism (such as Banda Bahadur (1716), Bhai Mati Das, Bhai Sati Das and Bhai Dayala), who were also tortured and killed by Mughal rulers for refusing their orders, and for opposing the persecution of Sikhs and Hindus. Subsequently, Sikhism militarised itself to oppose Mughal hegemony. The emergence of the Sikh Confederacy under the misls and Sikh Empire under the reign of the Maharajah Ranjit Singh (r. 1792–1839) was characterised by religious tolerance and pluralism with Christians, Muslims and Hindus in positions of power. The establishment of the Sikh Empire in 1799 is commonly considered the zenith of Sikhism in the political sphere, during its existence (from 1799 to 1849) the Sikh Empire came to include Kashmir, Ladakh, and Peshawar. A number of Hindu and Muslim peasants converted to Sikhism. Hari Singh Nalwa, the Commander-in-chief of the Sikh army along the northwest Frontier from 1825 to 1837, took the boundary of the Sikh Empire to the very mouth of the Khyber Pass. The Sikh Empire's secular administration integrated innovative military, economic and governmental reforms.

Sikh organizations, including the Chief Khalsa Dewan and Shiromani Akali Dal led by Master Tara Singh, strongly opposed the partition of India, viewing the possibility of the creation of Pakistan as inviting persecution. The months leading up to the partition of India in 1947, saw heavy conflict in the Punjab between Sikhs and Muslims, which saw the effective religious migration of Punjabi Sikhs and Hindus from West Punjab and organized ethnic cleansing of Punjabi Muslims from East Punjab. Currently, most Sikhs live in the Indian state of Punjab, where they formed about 60 percent of the state population.

== Early Modern (1469 CE –1708 CE) ==
=== Guru Nanak ===
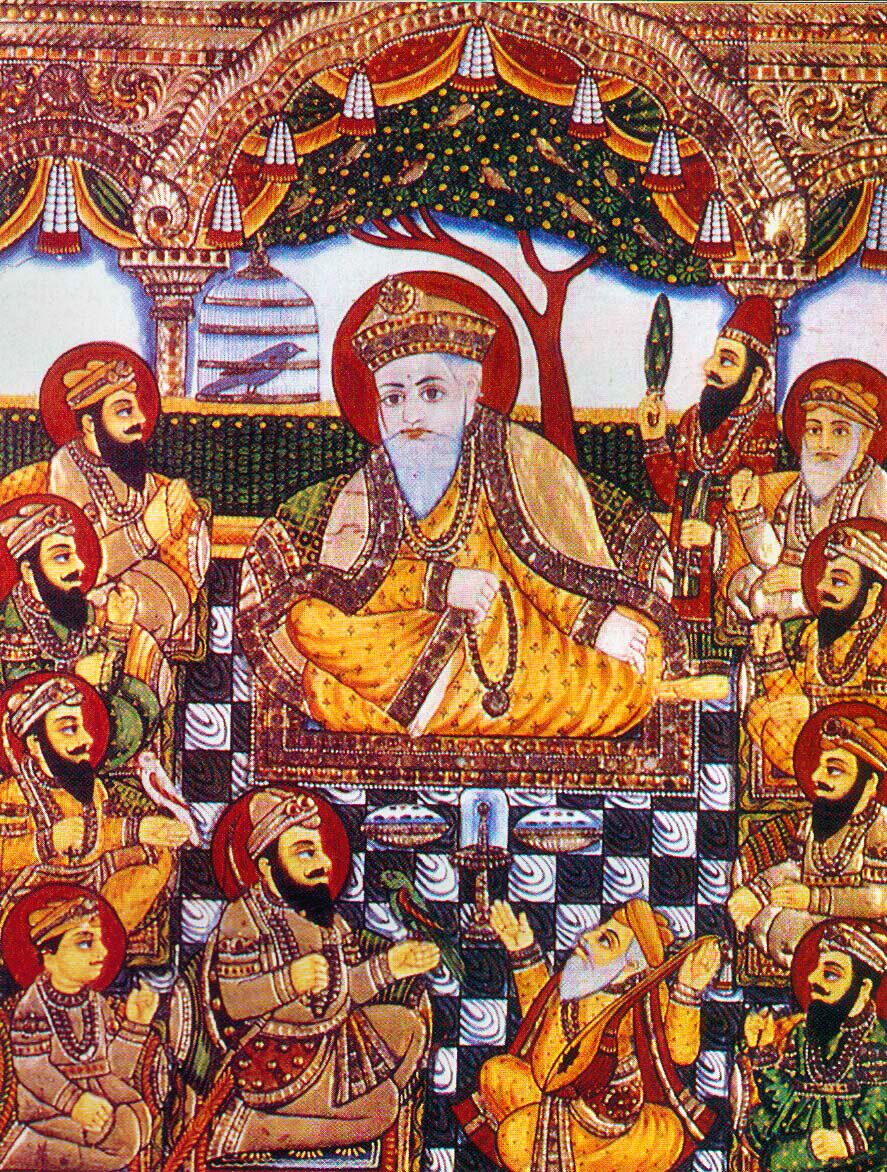
Guru Nanak Dev Ji (1469 – 1539 CE)

Guru Nanak (1469–1539), founder of Sikhism, was born to Mehta Kalu and Mata Tripta, in the village of Talwandi, now called Nankana Sahib, near Lahore. His father was a Patwari, an accountant of land revenue in the government. He had one older sister, Bibi Nanki. His parents were Hindu.

From an early age, Guru Nanak had a questioning and enquiring mind; he refused as a child to wear the ritualistic sacred thread called a janeu and instead said that he would wear the true name of God in his heart as protection, because a thread which could be broken, soiled, burnt or lost could not offer security. From early childhood, Bibi Nanki saw in her brother the Light of God but she did not reveal this secret to anyone. She is known as the first disciple of Guru Nanak.

Even as a boy, his desire to explore the mysteries of life eventually led him to leave home. Nanak married Sulakhni, daughter of Moolchand Chona, a trader from Batala, and they had two sons, Sri Chand and Lakhmi Chand.

His brother-in-law, Jai Ram, the husband of his sister Nanki, obtained a job for him in Sultanpur as the manager of the government granary. One morning, when he was twenty-eight, Guru Nanak went as usual down to the river to bathe and meditate. It was said that he was gone for three days. When he reappeared, it is said he was "filled with the spirit of God". His first words after his re-emergence were: "There is no Hindu, there is no Muslim". With this secular principle he began his missionary work. He made four distinct major journeys, in the four different directions, which are called Udasis, spanning many thousands of kilometres, preaching the message of God.

Guru Nanak spent the final years of his life in Kartarpur where Langar free blessed food was available. The food would be partaken of by Hindus, rich, poor, both high and so-called low castes. Guru Nanak worked in the fields and earned his livelihood. After appointing Bhai Lehna as the new Sikh Guru, on 22 September 1539, aged 70, Guru Nanak died.

=== Guru Angad ===
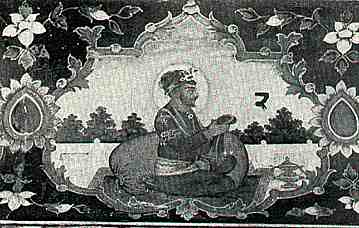
Guru Angad (1504 – 1552 CE)

In 1538, Guru Nanak chose Lehna, his disciple, as a successor to the Guruship rather than one of his sons. Bhai Lehna was named Guru Angad and became the successor of Guru Nanak. Bhai Lehna was born in the village of Harike in Ferozepur district in Punjab, on 31 March 1504. He was the son of a small trader named Pheru. His mother's name was Mata Ramo (also known as Mata Sabhirai, Mansa Devi, Daya Kaur). Baba Narayan Das Trehan was his grandfather, whose ancestral house was at Matte-di-Sarai near Muktsar.

Under the influence of his mother, Bhai Lehna began to worship Durga (a Hindu goddess). He used to lead a group of Hindu worshippers to Jwalamukhi Temple every year. He married Mata Khivi in January 1520 and had two sons, (Dasu and Datu), and two daughters (Amro and Anokhi). The whole Pheru family had to leave their ancestral village because of the ransacking by the Mughal and Afghan military who had come with Emperor Babur. After this, the family settled at the village of Khadur Sahib by the River Beas, near Tarn Taran Sahib, a small town about 25 km from Amritsar city.

One day, Bhai Lehna heard the recitation of a hymn of Guru Nanak from Bhai Jodha (a Sikh of Guru Nanak Sahib) who was in Khadur Sahib. He was thrilled and decided to proceed to Kartarpur to have an audience (darshan) with Guru Nanak. So while on the annual pilgrimage to Jwalamukhi Temple, Bhai Lehna left his journey to visit Kartarpur and see Baba Nanak. His very first meeting with Guru Nanak completely transformed him. He renounced the worship of the Hindu goddess, dedicated himself to the service of Guru Nanak and so became his disciple (his Sikh), and began to live in Kartarpur.

His devotion and service (Sewa) to Guru Nanak and his holy mission was so great that he was instated as the Second Nanak on 7 September 1539 by Guru Nanak. Earlier Guru Nanak tested him in various ways and found an embodiment of obedience and service in him. He spent six or seven years in the service of Guru Nanak at Kartarpur.

When Guru Nanak died on 22 September 1539, Guru Angad left Kartarpur for the village of Khadur Sahib (near Goindwal Sahib). He carried forward the principles of Guru Nanak both in letter and spirit. Yogis and Saints of different sects visited him and held detailed discussions about Sikhism with him.

Guru Angad introduced a new alphabet known as Gurmukhi Script, modifying the old Punjabi script's characters. Soon, this script became very popular and started to be used by the people in general. He took great interest in the education of children by opening many schools for their instruction and thus increased the number of literate people. For the youth, he started the tradition of Mall Akhara, where physical, as well as spiritual exercises, were held. He collected the facts about Guru Nanak's life from Bhai Bala and wrote the first biography of Guru Nanak. He also wrote 63 Saloks (stanzas), which are included in the Guru Granth Sahib. He popularized and expanded the institution of Guru ka Langar that had been started by Guru Nanak.

Guru Angad travelled widely and visited all important religious places and centres established by Guru Nanak for the preaching of Sikhism. He also established hundreds of new Centres of Sikhism (Sikh religious Institutions) and thus strengthened the base of Sikhism. The period of his Guruship was the most crucial one. The Sikh community had moved from having a founder to a succession of Gurus and the infrastructure of Sikh society was strengthened and crystallised.

=== Guru Amar Das ===
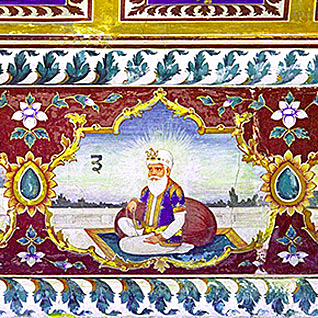
Guru Amar Das (1479 – 1574 CE)

Guru Amar Das became the third Sikh guru in 1552 at the age of 73. Goindwal became an important centre for Sikhism during the Guruship of Guru Amar Das. He continued to preach the principle of equality for women, the prohibition of Sati and the practice of Langar. In 1567, Emperor Akbar sat with the ordinary and poor people of Punjab to have Langar. Guru Amar Das also trained 140 apostles, of which 52 were women, to manage the rapid expansion of the religion. Before he died in 1574 aged 95, he appointed his son-in-law Jetha as the fourth Sikh Guru.

It is recorded that before becoming a Sikh, Bhai Amar Das, as he was known at the time, was a very religious Vaishanavite Hindu who spent most of his life performing all of the ritual pilgrimages and fasts of a devout Hindu. One day, Bhai Amar Das heard some hymns of Guru Nanak being sung by Bibi Amro, the daughter of Guru Angad, the second Sikh Guru. Bibi Amro was married to Bhai Amar Das' brother, Bhai Manak Chand's son who was called Bhai Jasso. Bhai Amar Das was so impressed and moved by these Shabads that he immediately decided to go to see Guru Angad at Khadur Sahib. It is recorded that this event took place when Amar Das was 61 years old.

In 1535, after meeting Guru Angad, Amar Das became a devout Sikh and fully dedicated himself to serving (Sewa) the Guru and the community. He moved to Khadur Sahib, where he fetched water for the Guru's bath, washed his clothes, and collected wood for the 'Guru ka Langar'. His devotion was so complete that he was seen as having no worldly interests, earning him the nickname Amru.

However, as a result of Amar Das' commitment to Sikh principles, dedicated service, and devotion to the Sikh cause, Guru Angad Sahib appointed Bhai Amar Das as the third Nanak in March 1552 at the age of 73. He established his headquarters in the newly built town of Goindwal, which Guru Angad had established.

Soon large numbers of Sikhs started flocking to Goindwal to see the new Guru. Here, Guru Amar Das propagated the Sikh faith in a vigorous, systematic, and planned manner. He divided the Sikh Sangat area into 22 preaching centres or Manjis, each under the charge of a devout Sikh. He himself visited and sent Sikh missionaries to different parts of India to spread Sikhism.

Guru Amar Das was impressed with Bhai Gurdas' thorough knowledge of Hindi and Sanskrit and the Hindu scriptures. Following the tradition of sending out Masands across the country, Guru Amar Das deputed Bhai Gurdas to Agra to spread the gospel of Sikhism. Before leaving, Guru Amar Das prescribed the following routine for Sikhs:

He who calls himself a Sikh of the True Guru, He must get up in the morning and say his prayers. He must rise in the early hours and bathe in the holy tank. He must meditate on God as advised by the Guru. And rid him of the afflictions of sins and evil. As the day dawns, he should recite scriptures, and repeat God's name in every activity. He to whom the Guru takes kindly is shown the path. Nanak! I seek the dust of the feet of the Guru's Sikh who himself remembers God and makes others remember Him. (Gauri)

The Guru strengthened the tradition of 'Guru ka Langar' and made it compulsory for the visitor to the Guru to eat first, saying that 'Pehle Pangat Phir Sangat' (first visit the Langar then go to the Guru). Once Mughal emperor Akbar came to see the Guru and he had to eat the coarse rice in the Langar before he could have an audience with the Guru. The emperor was so impressed with this system that he expressed his desire to grant some royal property for 'Guru ka Langar', but the Guru declined it with respect.

He introduced new birth, marriage, and death ceremonies. Thus he raised the status of women and protected the rights of female infants who were killed without question as they were deemed to have no status. These teachings were met with stiff resistance from the Orthodox Hindus.

Guru Amar Das not only preached the equality of people irrespective of their caste but also fostered the idea of women's equality. He preached strongly against the practice of Sati (a Hindu wife burning on her husband's funeral pyre). Guru Amar Das also disapproved of a young widow remaining unmarried for the rest of her life.

Guru Amar Das constructed "Baoli" at Goindwal Sahib having eighty-four steps and made it a Sikh pilgrimage centre for the first time in the history of Sikhism. He reproduced more copies of the hymns of Guru Nanak and Guru Angad. He also composed 869 (according to some chronicles these were 709) verses (stanzas) including Anand Sahib, and then later on Guru Arjan (fifth Guru) made all the Shabads part of Guru Granth Sahib.

When the time came for the Guru's younger daughter Bibi Bhani to marry, he selected a pious and diligent young follower of his called Jetha from Lahore. Jetha had come to visit the Guru with a party of pilgrims from Lahore and had become so enchanted by the Guru's teachings that he had decided to settle in Goindwal. Here he earned a livelihood selling boiled chickpeas and would regularly attend the services of Guru Amar Das in his spare time.

Guru Amar Das did not consider any of his sons fit for Guruship and chose instead his son-in-law (Guru) Ram Das to succeed him. Guru Amar Das Sahib at the age of 95 died on 1 September 1574 at Goindwal in District Amritsar, after giving the responsibility of Guruship to the Fourth Nanak, Guru Ram Das.

=== Guru Ram Das ===
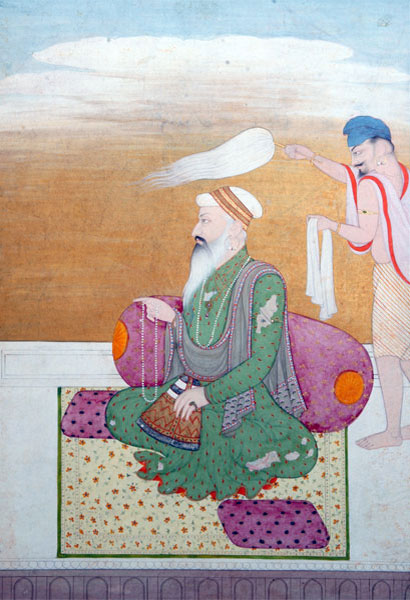
Guru Ram Das (1534 – 1581 CE)

Guru Ram Das (Punjabi: ਗੁਰੂ ਰਾਮ ਦਾਸ) (Born in Lahore, Punjab, Pakistan on 24 September 1534 – 1 September 1581, Amritsar, Punjab, India) was the fourth of the Ten Gurus of Sikhism, and he became Guru on 30 August 1574, following in the footsteps of Guru Amar Das. He was born in Lahore to a Sodhi family of the Khatri clan. His father was Hari Das and his mother Anup Devi, and his name was Jetha, meaning 'first born'. His wife was Bibi Bhani, the younger daughter of Guru Amar Das, the third guru of the Sikhs. They had three sons: Prithi Chand, Mahan dev, and Arjan Dev.

As a Guru one of his main contributions to Sikhism was organising the structure of Sikh society. Additionally, he was the author of Laava, the hymns of the Marriage Rites, the designer of the Harmandir Sahib, and the planner and creator of the township of Ramdaspur (later Amritsar).

A hymn by Guru Ram Das from Ang 305 of the Guru Granth Sahib: "One who calls himself a Sikh of the True Guru shall get up early morning and meditate on the Lord's Name. Make effort regularly to cleanse, bathe and dip in the ambrosial pool. Upon Guru's instructions, chant Har, Har singing which, all misdeeds, sins, and pains shall go away."

Guru Ram Das nominated Guru Arjan, his youngest son, as the next Guru of the Sikhs.

=== Guru Arjan Dev ===
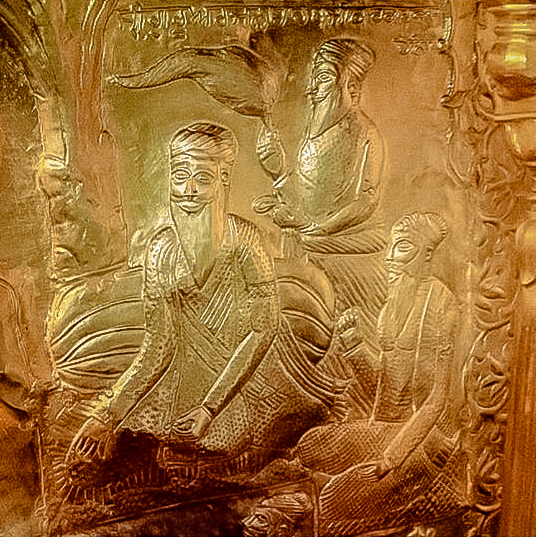
Guru Arjan (1563 – 1606 CE)

In 1581, Guru Arjan — the youngest son of the fourth guru — became the Fifth Guru of the Sikhs. In addition to being responsible for building the Golden Temple, he prepared the Sikh Sacred text and his personal addition of some 2,000 plus hymns in the Gurū Granth Sāhib. He compiled and composed the most hymns. He even added many Sufi Saints, Bhagats, Bhatts and Gursikhs verses such as Sheik Farid, Sant Kabir, Bhagat Namdev and Bhai Mardana.

In 1604 he installed the Ādi Granth for the first time as the Holy Book of the Sikhs. He is known as Shaheedan-De-Sartaaj or Crown of Martyrs because he gave Jehangir's son langer and made him hear Kirtan, his son, Khusrau, was revolting against Jehangir. Guru Arjan refused to convert to Islam when he was given the choice.

=== Guru Hargobind ===
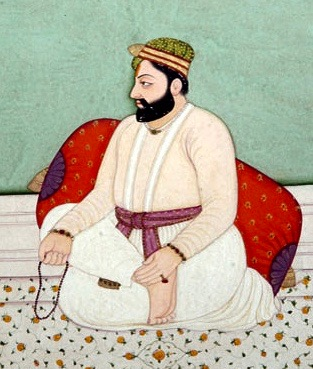
Guru Hargobind (1595 – 1644 CE)

Guru Hargobind became the sixth guru of the Sikhs. He carried two swords — one for spiritual reasons and one for temporal (worldly) reasons. From this point onward, the Sikhs became a military force and always had a trained fighting force to defend their independence, establishing the Akal Sena.

Guru Hargobind fixed two Nishan Sahibs at Akal Bunga in front of the Akal Takht. One flag is towards the Harmandir Sahib and the other shorter flag is towards Akal Takht. The first represents the reins of the spiritual authority while the later represents temporal power stating temporal power should be under the reins of the spiritual authority.

=== Guru Har Rai ===
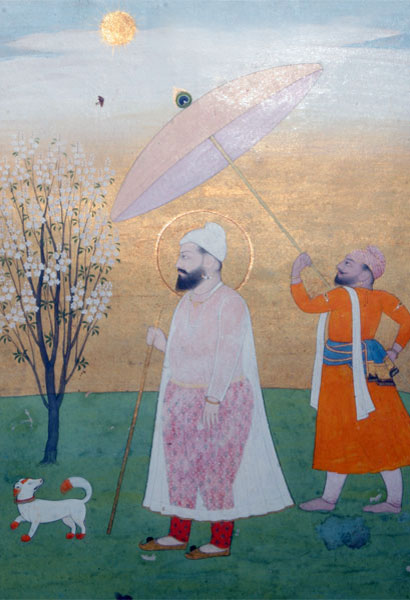
Guru Har Rai (1630 – 1661 CE)

Guru Har Rai (Punjabi: ਗੁਰੂ ਹਰਿ ਰਾਇ) (26 February 1630 – 6 October 1661) was the seventh of the ten Gurus of Sikhism, becoming Guru on 8 March 1644, following in the footsteps of his grandfather, Guru Har Gobind, who was the sixth guru. Before Guru Har Rai died, he nominated Guru Har Krishan, his youngest son, as the next Guru of the Sikhs.

As a child, Guru Har Rai was disturbed by the suffering of a flower damaged by his robe, foreshadowing his lifelong compassion for living things. His grandfather, a renowned hunter, had saved Emperor Jahangir from a tiger. While Guru Har Rai continued hunting until age 31, he permitted no animals to be killed during his grand hunts, instead capturing them for his zoo. He also toured the Malwa and Doaba regions of Punjab.

His son, Ram Rai, tried to ease Aurangzeb's concerns about a line in Guru Nanak's verse, claiming the word "Mussalman" was a copyist's error. The Guru refused to meet him again, stating, "Ram Rai, you have disobeyed my order and sinned; I will never see you again because of your infidelity." It was reported that Ram Rai performed miracles in the Mughal court against his father's wishes, despite the Guru teaching Sikhs to reject magic and myths. Before his death at 31, Guru Har Rai passed the Gaddi of Nanak to his five-year-old son, Guru Har Krishan.

Guru Har Rai was the son of Baba Gurdita and Mata Nihal Kaur (also known as Mata Ananti). Baba Gurdita was the son of the sixth Guru, Guru Hargobind. Guru Har Rai married Mata Kishan Kaur (sometimes also referred to as Sulakhni), daughter of Sri Daya Ram of Anoopshahr (Bulandshahr) in Uttar Pradesh on Har Sudi 3, Samvat 1697. Guru Har Rai had two sons: Baba Ram Rai and Sri Har Krishan.

Though a man of peace, Guru Har Rai maintained the armed Sikh warriors established by his grandfather, Guru Hargobind, and fostered their military spirit. However, he refrained from direct political conflict with the Mughal Empire. When Dara Shikoh, the eldest son of Emperor Shah Jahan, sought help in his succession war against his brother Aurangzeb, the Guru, honoring a promise to his grandfather to use the Sikh cavalry only for defense, nonetheless assisted Dara by hiding the ferry boats he needed for his escape from Aurangzeb's forces.

=== Guru Har Krishan ===
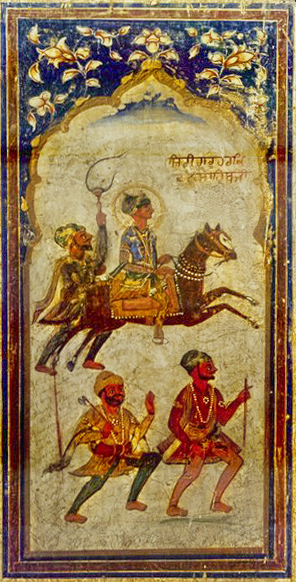
Guru Har Krishan (1656 – 1664 CE)

Guru Har Krishan born in Kirat Pur, Ropar (Punjabi: ਗੁਰੂ ਹਰਿ ਕ੍ਰਿਸ਼ਨ) (7 July 1656 – 30 March 1664) was the eighth of the Ten Gurus of Sikhism, becoming the Guru on 7 October 1661, following in the footsteps of his father, Guru Har Rai. Before Har Krishan died of complications of Smallpox, he nominated his granduncle, Guru Teg Bahadur, as the next Guru of the Sikhs. The following is a summary of the main highlights of his short life:

Sri Guru Harkrishan Ji was the epitome of sensibility, generosity, and courage. There is a famous incident from an early age. Once on the way to Delhi from Punjab he met an arrogant Brahmin Pundit called Lal Chand in Panjokhara town. The Pundit asked him to recite Salokas from the Geeta since his name was similar to that of Lord Krishna. Guru Ji invited a mute person called Chhajju Mehra and placed his stick on his head. He immediately started interpreting salokas from the Geeta. Everybody around was dumbstruck. Lal Chand's arrogance too was shattered and he asked for Guru Ji's forgiveness.

When Har Krishan stayed in Delhi there was a smallpox epidemic and many people were dying. According to Sikh history at Har Krishan's blessing, the lake at Bangla Sahib provided cure for thousands. Gurdwara Bangla Sahib was constructed in the Guru's memory. This is where he stayed during his visit to Delhi. Gurdwara Bala Sahib was built in south Delhi besides the bank of the river Yamuna, where Har Krishan was cremated at the age of about 7 years and 8 months. Guru Har Krishan was the youngest Guru at only 7 years of age. He did not make any contributions to Gurbani.

=== Guru Tegh Bahadur ===
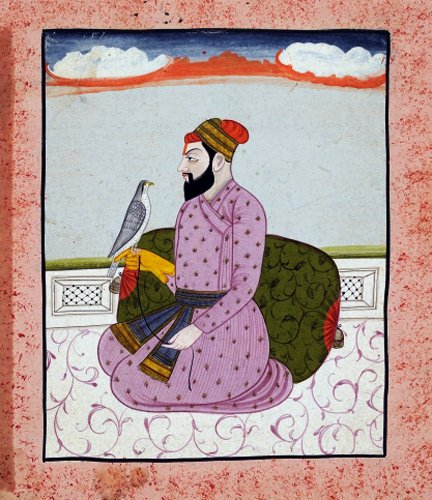
Guru Tegh Bahadur, Pahari painting

Guru Tegh Bahadur was the ninth of the Sikh Gurus. The eighth Sikh Guru, Guru Har Krishan, nominated him, his grand-uncle as the next Guru before he died. Guru Tegh Bahadur was actually the son of the sixth Sikh Guru, Guru Hargobind.

He sacrificed himself to protect Hindus. Aurungzeb was forcibly converting Hindus to Muslims. Hindus from Kashmir came to Guru Teg Bahadur for protection and requested for assistance. Guru asked them to tell Aurungzeb that if he will be able to convert Guru Teg Bahadur to Islam then they all become Muslim. He was asked by Aurungzeb, the Mughal emperor, under coercion by conservative Naqshbandi clerics, to convert to Islam or to sacrifice himself. The exact place where he died is in front of the Red Fort in Delhi (Lal Qila) and the gurdwara is called Sisganj. This marked a turning point for Sikhism. His successor, Guru Gobind Singh further militarised his followers.

While, Bhai Mati Das along with his younger brother Bhai Sati Das were martyrs of early Sikh history. Bhai Mati Das, Bhai Dayala, and Bhai Sati Das were executed at a kotwali (police-station) in the Chandni Chowk area of Delhi, under the express orders of Emperor Aurangzeb just before the martyrdom of Guru Tegh Bahadur. Bhai Mati Das was executed by being bound between two pillars and cut in two.

=== Guru Gobind Singh ===
==== Birth and Childhood ====
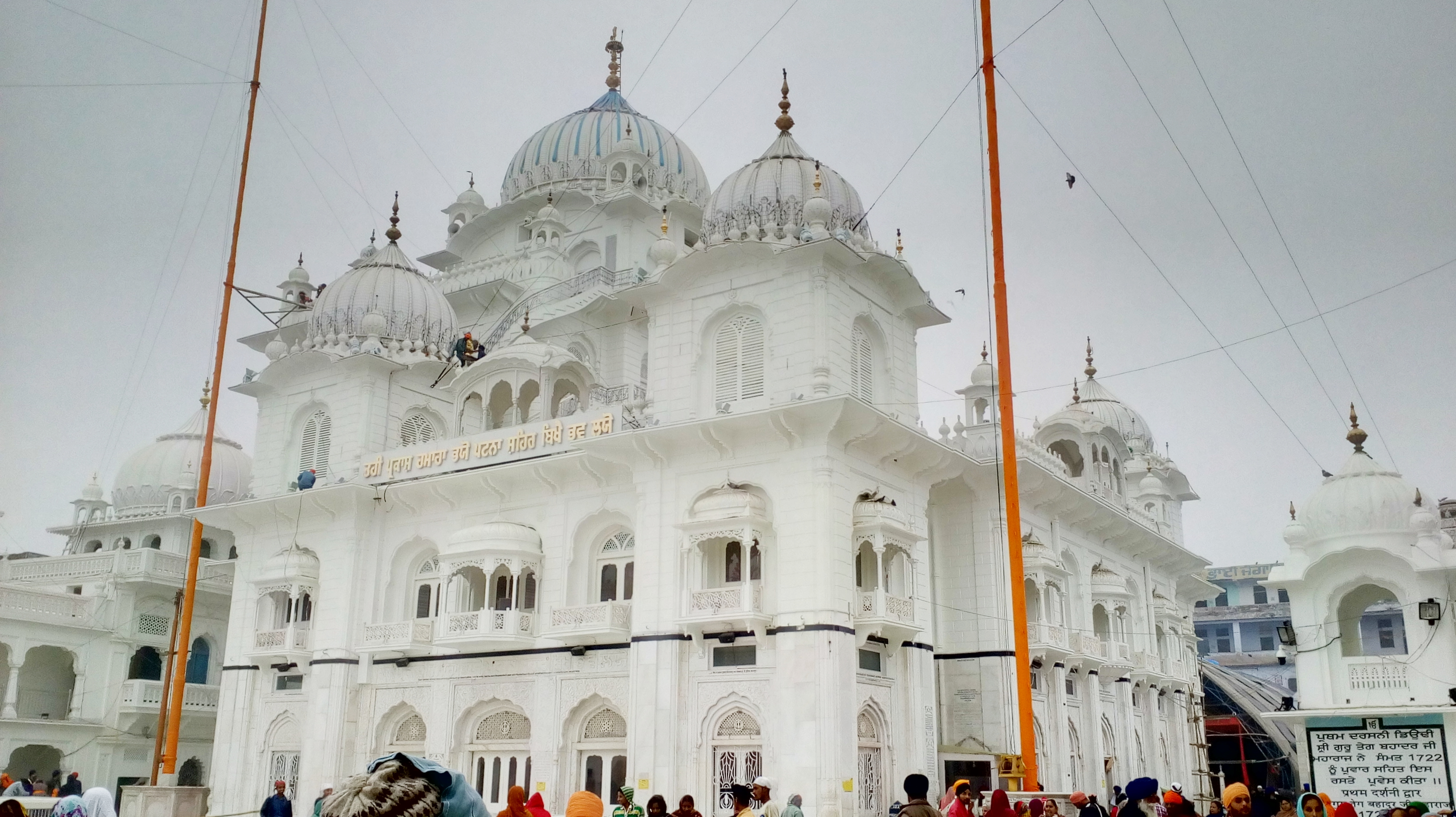
Takht Sri Patna Sahib, where Guru Gobind Singh was born.

Guru Gobind Singh was the tenth guru of Sikhs. He was born in 1666 at Patna (Capital of Bihar, India) and did his basic schooling there. Along with the religious scriptures, he also studied the Bihari language at Patna. His Uncle, Bhai Kripal, trained him in archery and swordsmanship and soon he became a great marksman. When Guru Tegh Bahadur returned from Dhaka (now Bangladesh‘s Capital) to Patna he saw his five years old child for the first time, and kissed and embraced his divine boy. The Guru blossomed under the spiritual guidance of his father, but it was short-lived since Guru Tegh bahadur had to leave Patna for Anandpur.

Gobind Rai, as he was known at the time, was regarded favorably by many people in Patna, including members of the Muslim community. Accounts describe him as having a pleasant and approachable personality that made a positive impression on those he encountered. By the age of six, he had learned Hindi, Marathi, and Gurmukhi. He was also described as confident and courageous, qualities that were later associated with his role as a leader.

A Raja's childless Queen had developed special fondness for the young Guru Gobind Singh, who, too, often came here to sit in the Queen's lap giving her immense delight and spiritual solace. She fed the Child Gobind and his playmates, at his demand, with boiled and salted gram.

==== In Kashmir ====
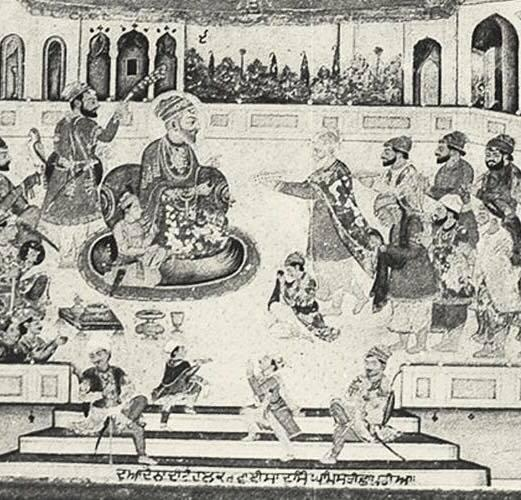
Detail of a mural from Gurdwara Baba Atal Rai depicting Guru Tegh Bahadar and a young Guru Gobind Singh (then known as Gobind Das or Gobind Rai) receiving a delegation of Kashmiri Pandits (alt. spelt as 'Pundits') whom petition their help against religious persecution of Kashmiri Hindus by the Mughal Empire. This fresco no longer exists and has since been lost.

In 1675 Pundits from Kashmir in India came to Anandpur Sahib pleading to Guru Teg Bahadur (father of Guru Gobind Singh) about Aurangzeb forcing them to convert to Islam. Guru Teg Bahadur told them that martyrdom of a great man was needed. His son, Guru Gobind Singh said "Who could be greater than you", to his father. Guru Teg Bahadur told pundits to tell Aurangzeb's men that if Guru Teg Bahadur will become Muslim, they all will.

==== Stay at Paonta Sahib and Anandpur Sahib ====
After Guru Tegh Bahadur's martyrdom Guru Gobind Singh created many poems compositions and letters, including Zafarnama, Ugardandis, Lakhi Jungle Khalsa, Hikayatan, Akal Ustat, Jaap Sahib etc., these were incorporated into the Dasam Granth and Sarbloh Granth respectively. He stayed at Anandpur Sahib for most of his life and the Hindu Hill Chieftains were jealous of his riches so the Kingdoms of Kahlur, Bilaspur, Garhwal and common Hindus made an alliance to fight him. He and the kingdom of Una allied and won the Battle of Bhangani. The even more Himachali states allied and still lost. This showed the Guruji's influence and military strength in the area.

==== Mughal-Sikh Wars and Death of the Sahibzadas ====
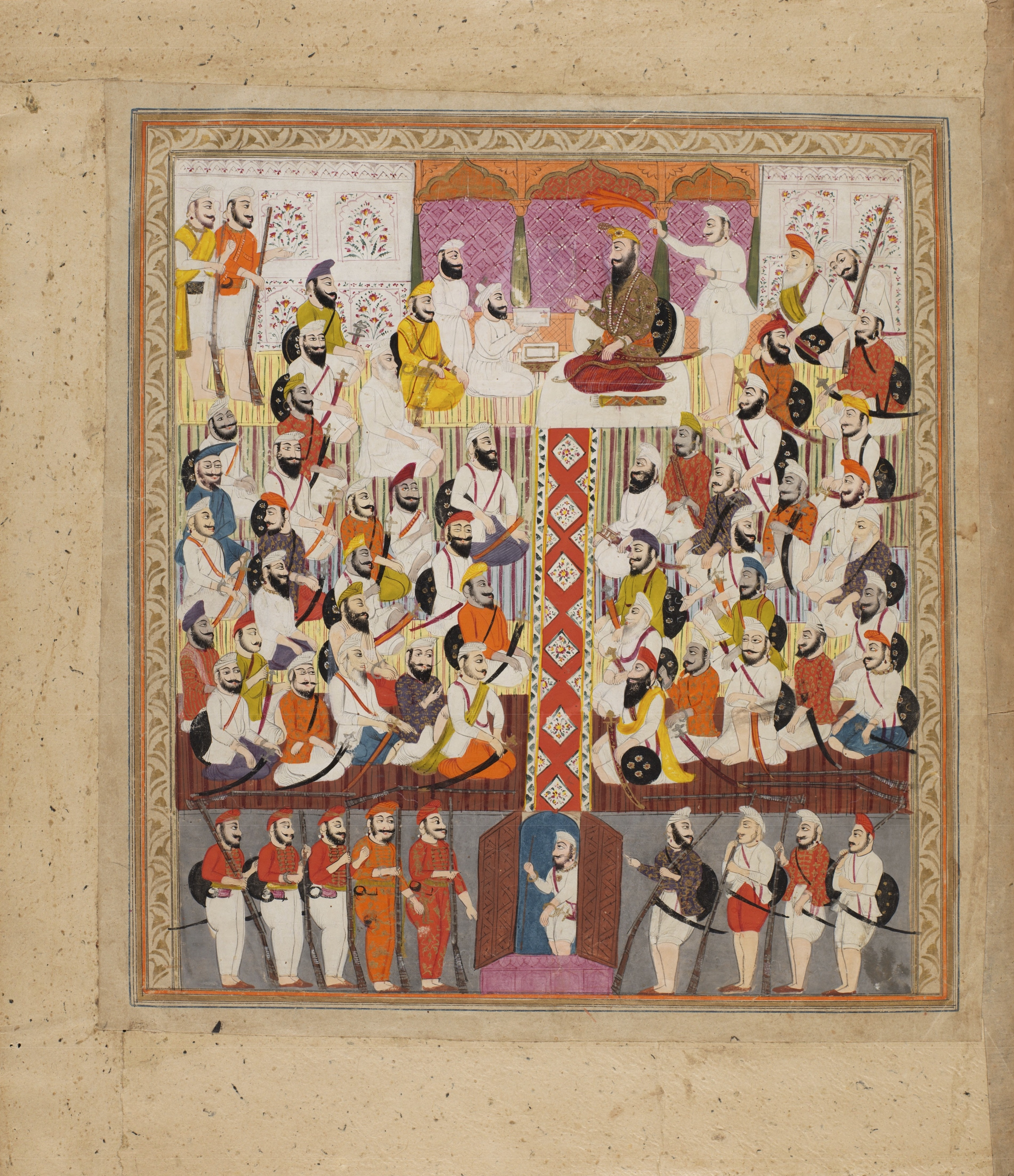
Painting of the court of Guru Gobind Singh. Illustration from a manuscript of Krishnavatar

They allied with Wazir Khan of Sirhind and the Subedar of Lahore and together they still lost and one day Guruji started retreating from Anandpur Sahib and he got separated with his two sons aged 5 and 9 due to the cold Sirsa River. He entrusted his Brahmin cook, Gangu Brahmin, to take care of them but he sold them to Wazir Khan. In the meantime Aurangzeb dispatched 50,000-75,000 troops to attack the Guruji. after he sent his elder sons and 42 others to fight only 17,000 Mughals came back alive, his elder sons died on the battlefield with bravery and honour. The younger sons and their grandmother remained trapped in the same week that their brothers died. Wazir Khan said that he would give them riches if they convert and immurement if they do not, they chose death, till now Sahibzada Fateh Singh is the youngest Martyr in the history of the World. Guru Gobind Singh sent his letter of victory to Aurangzeb and they signed a treaty. Later when Aurangzeb Died and the Guru was in Rajputana there was a war of succession between Muhammad Azam Shah and Bahadur Shah I and Guru Gobind Singh sided with Bahadur Shah I who was secular in his views. On his way to Aurangabad he was stabbed three times in his lungs and killed the assassin. He survived for three more weeks and but later died from his wounds.

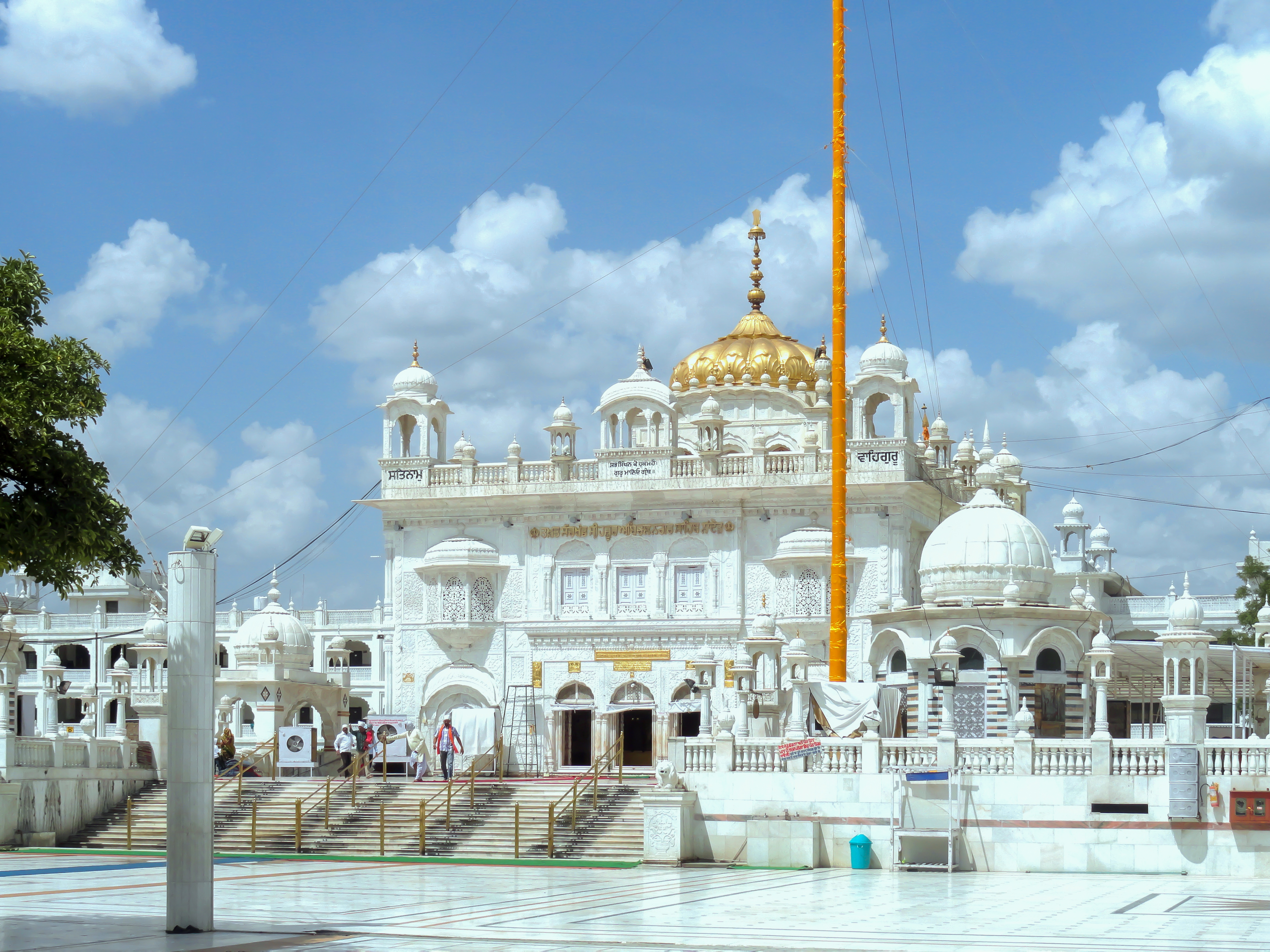
Takht Sri Hazur Sahib, Nanded where Guru Gobind Singh died.

Before his death, Guru Gobind Singh declared that the Guru Granth Sahib would be the ultimate spiritual authority for Sikhs, while the Khalsa Panth would hold temporal authority. The first compilation of the Sikh Holy Scripture was completed by the Fifth Guru, Guru Arjan, in 1604, although earlier Gurus also documented their revelations. This scripture is unique as it was compiled by the faith's founders during their lifetimes. The Guru Granth Sahib is particularly unique among sacred texts in that it is written in Gurmukhi script but contains many languages including Punjabi, Hindustani, Sanskrit, Bhojpuri, Arabic and Persian. Sikhs consider the Guru Granth Sahib the last, perpetual living guru.

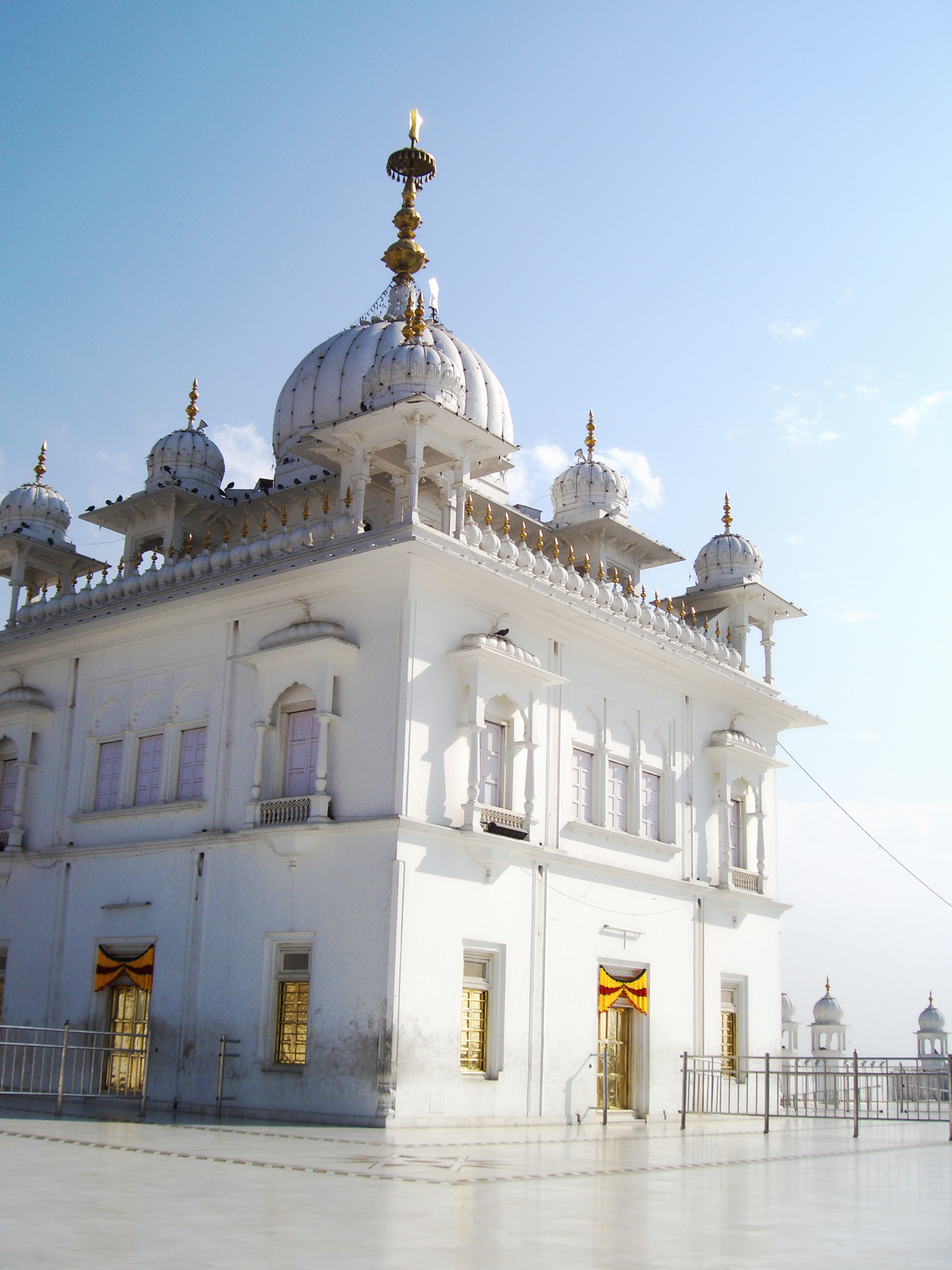
Keshgarh Sahib Gurudwara at Anandpur Sahib, Punjab, the birthplace of Khalsa.

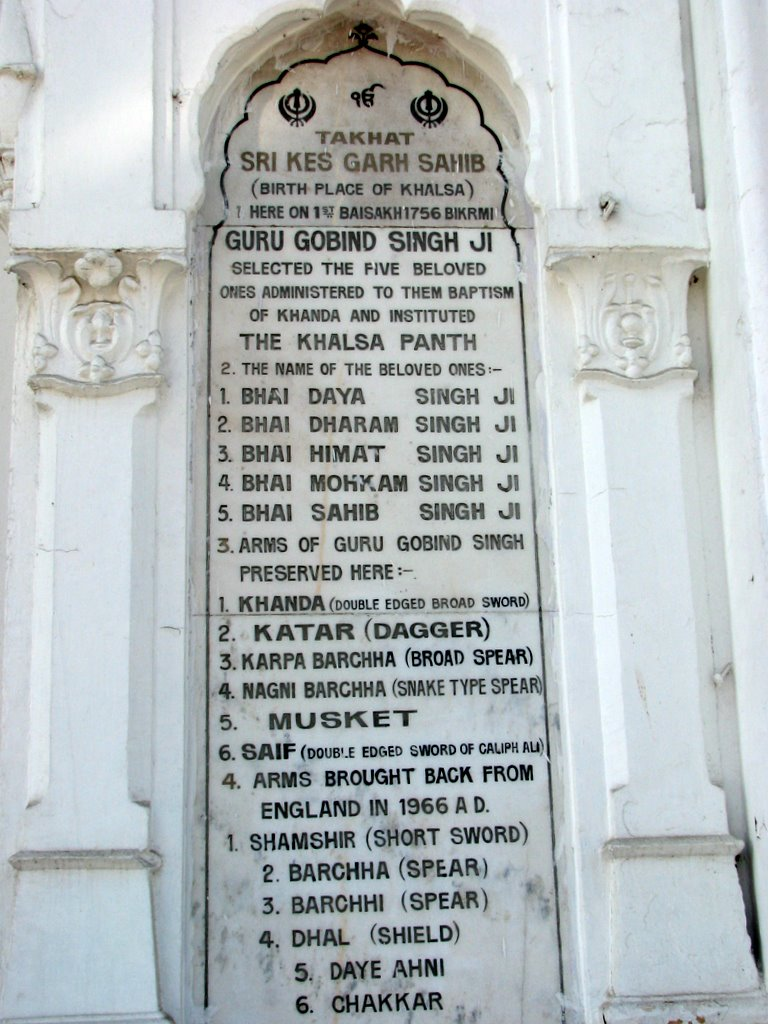
An inscription naming the five members of the Khalsa Panth, at Takht Keshgarh Sahib, the birthplace of Khalsa on Baisakh 1, 1756 Vikram Samvat.

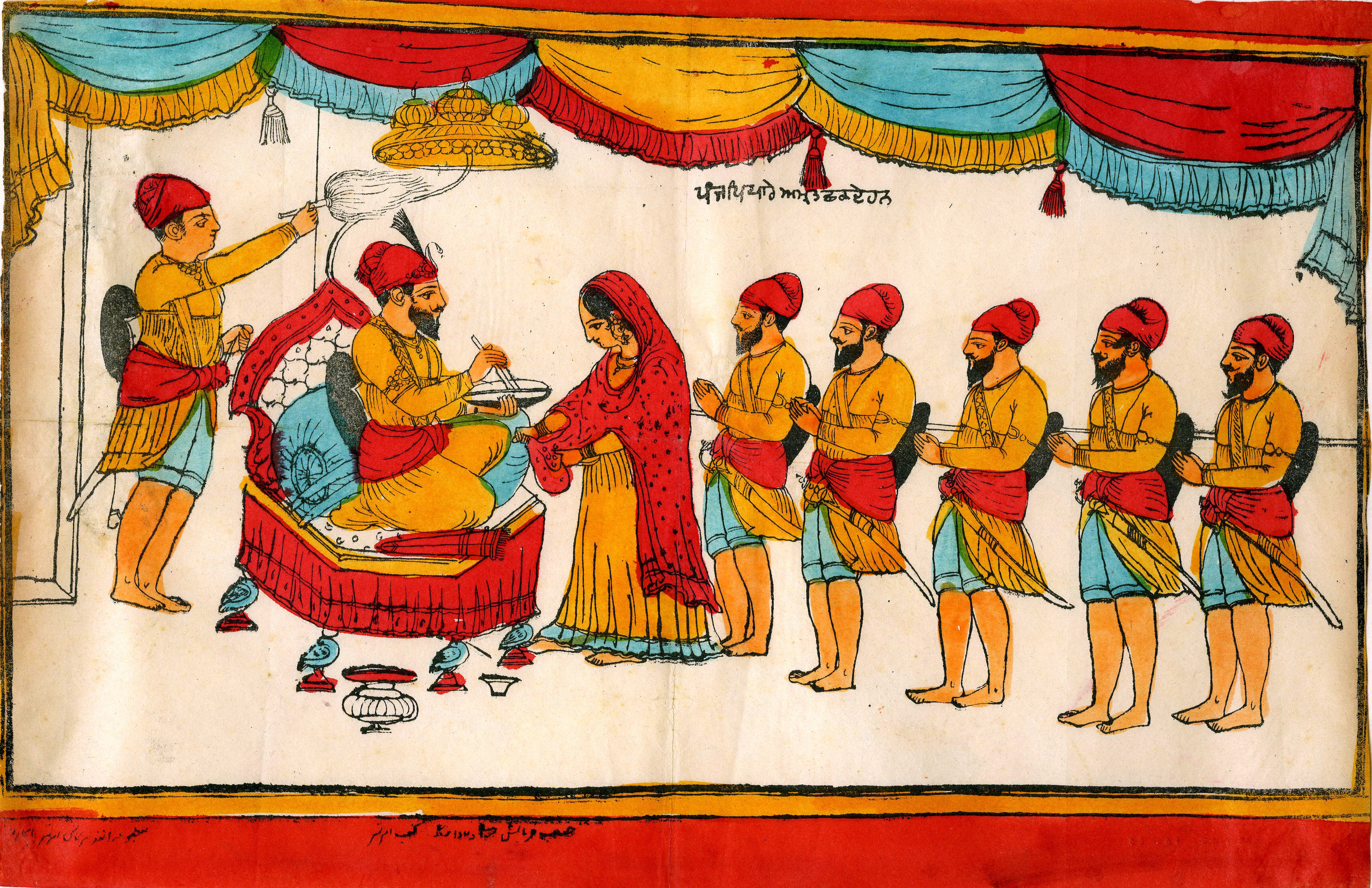
The creation of the Khalsa; initiated by Guru Gobind Singh, the tenth Sikh Guru.

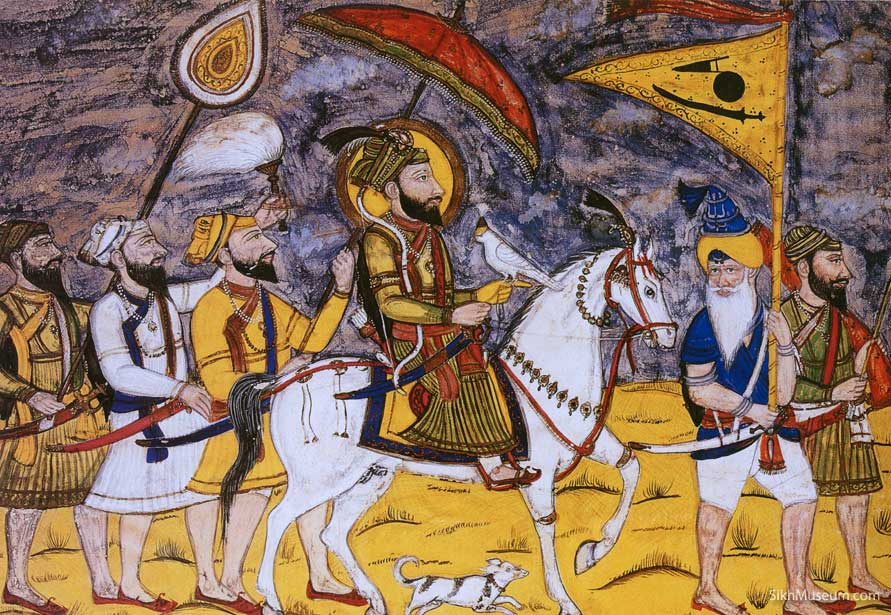
Guru Gobind Singh on march to Aurangabad

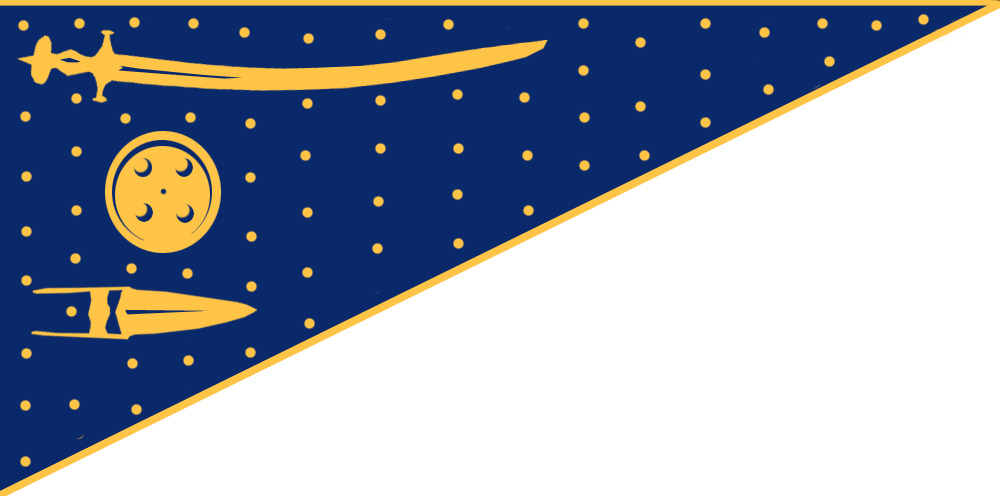
One of the two Sikh Nishan Sahibs

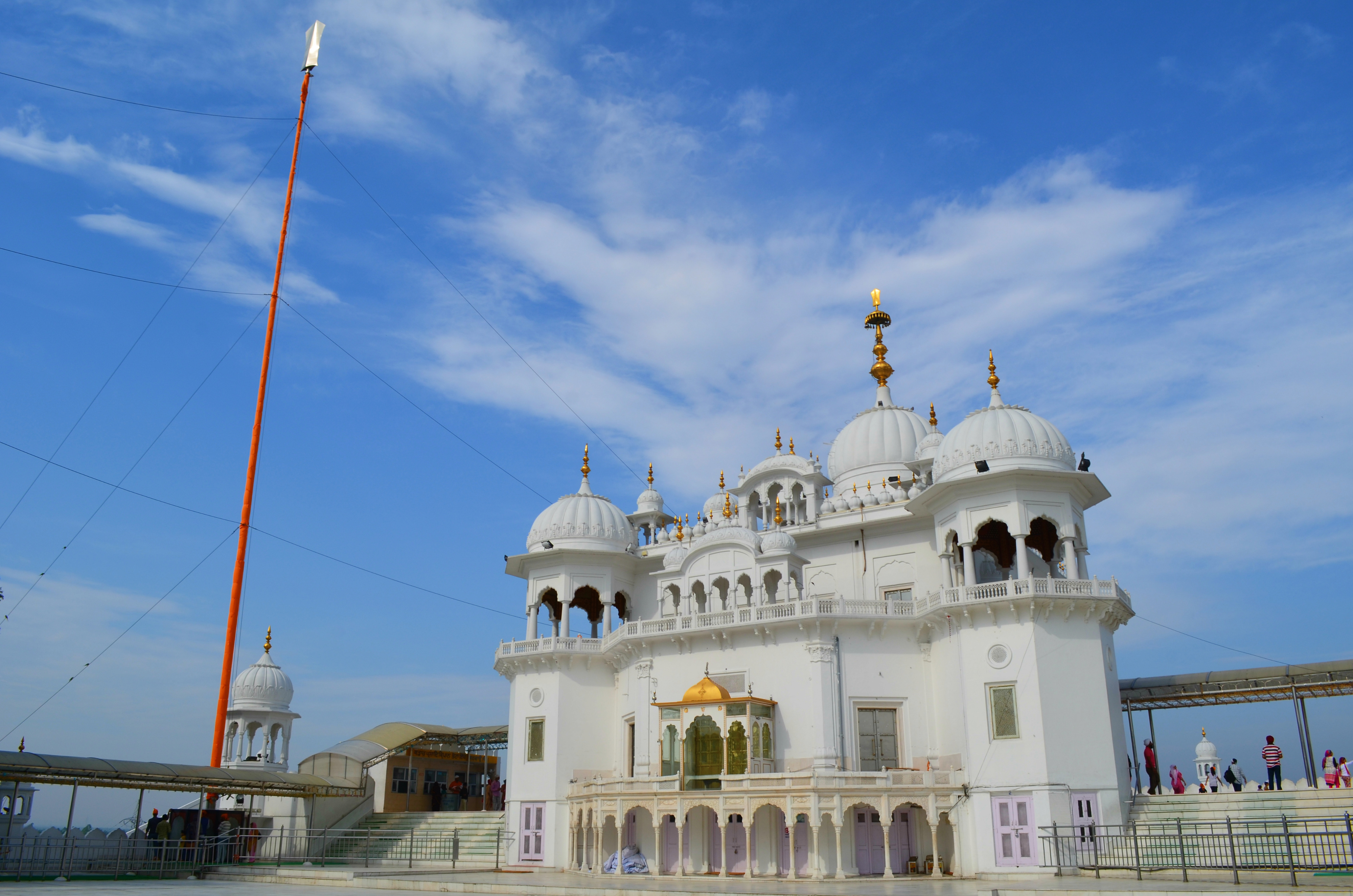
Anandpur Sahib where the Khalsa was formed

== Late Modern Age (1708–1748 CE) ==
=== Banda Singh Bahadur ===
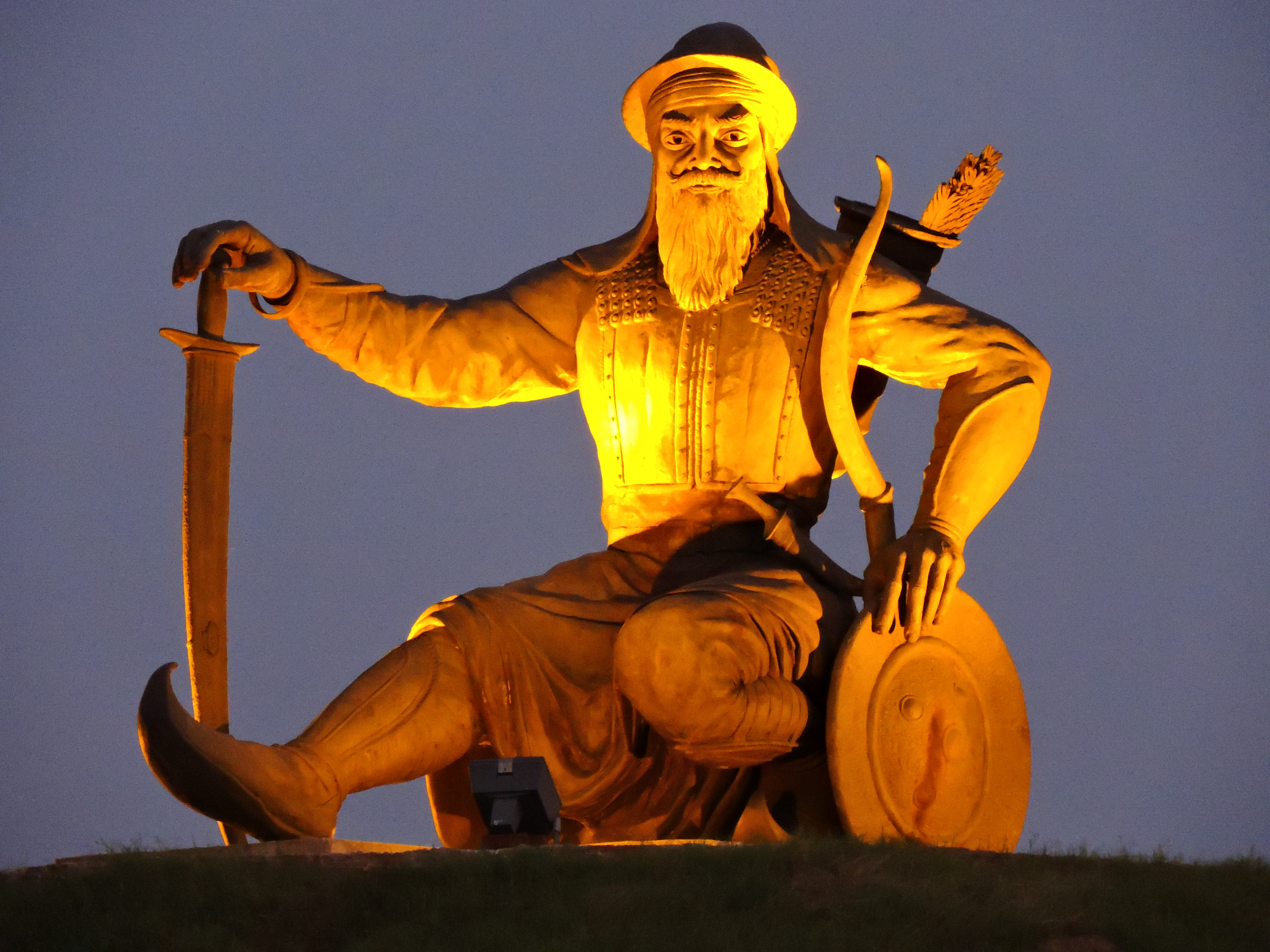
Statue of Baba Banda Singh Bahadur at Chappar Chiri.

Banda Singh Bahadur was chosen to lead the Sikhs by Guru Gobind Singh. He was successful in setting up a Sikh Empire that spread from Uttar Pradesh to Punjab. He fought the Mughal state tyranny and gave the common people of Punjab courage, equality, and rights. On his way to Punjab, Banda Singh punished robbers and other criminal elements making him popular with the people. Banda Singh inspired the minds of the non-Muslim people, who came to look upon the Sikhs as defenders of their faith and country. Banda Singh possessed no army but Guru Gobind Singh in a Hukamnama called to the people of Punjab to take arms under the leadership of Banda Singh overthrow and destroy the oppressive Mughal rulers, oppressed Muslims and oppressed Hindus also joined him in the popular revolt against the tyrants.

Banda Singh Bahadur camped in Khar Khoda, near Sonipat from there he took over Sonipat and Kaithal. In 1709 Banda Singh captured the Mughal city of Samana with the help of revolting oppressed Hindu and common folk, killing about 10,000 Muslims. Samana which was famous for minting coins, with this treasury the Sikhs became financially stable. The Sikhs soon took over Saraswati Nagar and Sadhora (near Jagadhri). The Sikhs then captured the Cis-Sutlej areas of Punjab including Ghurham, Kapori, Banoor, Malerkotla, and Nahan. The Sikhs captured Sirhind in 1710 and killed the Governor of Sirhind, Wazir Khan who was responsible for the death of the two youngest sons of Guru Gobind Singh at Sirhind. Becoming the ruler of Sirhind Banda Singh gave order to give ownership of the land to the farmers and let them live in dignity and self-respect. Petty officials were also satisfied with the change. Dindar Khan, an official of the nearby village, took Amrit and became Dinder Singh and the newspaper writer of Sirhind, Mir Nasir-ud-din, became Mir Nasir Singh.

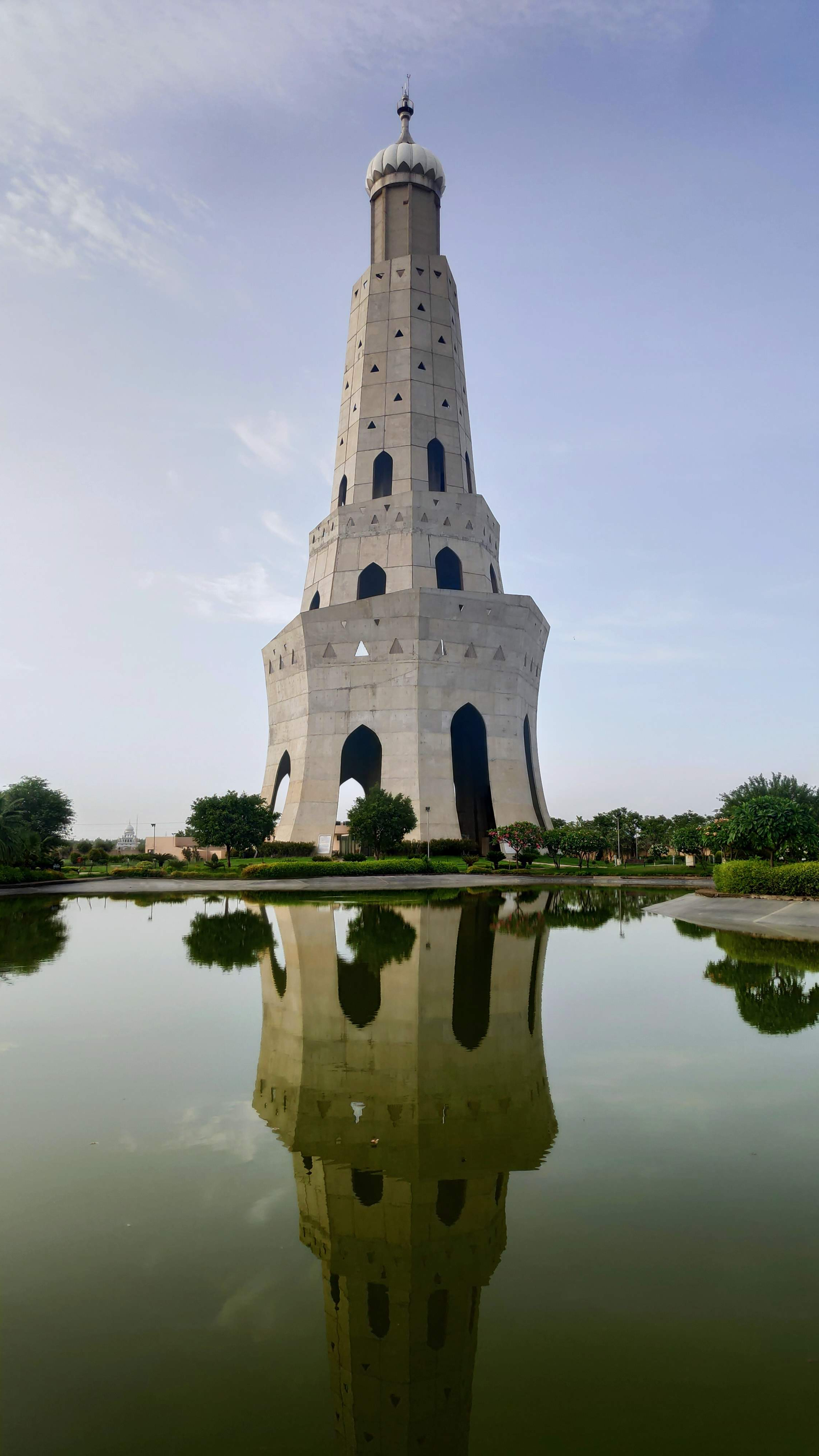
Fateh Burj, dedicated to Banda Singh Bahadur

Banda Singh developed the village of Mukhlisgarh, and made it his capital. He then renamed the city it to Lohgarh (fortress of steel) where he issued his own mint. The coin described Lohgarh: "Struck in the City of Peace, illustrating the beauty of civic life, and the ornament of the blessed throne." He briefly established a state in Punjab for half a year. Banda Singh sent Sikhs to the Uttar Pradesh and Sikhs took over Saharanpur, Jalalabad, Saharanpur, and other areas nearby bringing relief to the repressed population. In the regions of Jalandhar and Amritsar, the Sikhs started fighting for the rights of the people. They used their newly established power to remove corrupt officials and replace them with honest ones.

Banda Singh is known to have abolished or halted the Zamindari system in time he was active and gave the farmers proprietorship of their own land. It seems that all classes of government officers were addicted to extortion and corruption and the whole system of regulatory and order was subverted. Local tradition recalls that the people from the neighborhood of Sadaura came to Banda Singh complaining of the iniquities practices by their landlords. Banda Singh ordered Baj Singh to open fire on them. The people were astonished at the strange reply to their representation, and asked him what he meant. He told them that they deserved no better treatment when being thousands in number they still allowed themselves to be cowed down by a handful of Zamindars.

The rule of the Sikhs over the entire Punjab east of Lahore obstructed the communication between Delhi and Lahore, the capital of Punjab, and this worried Mughal Emperor Bahadur Shah He gave up his plan to subdue rebels in Rajasthan and marched towards Punjab. The entire Imperial force was organised to defeat and kill Banda Singh. All the generals were directed to join the Emperor’s army. To ensure that there were no Sikh agents in the army camps, an order was issued on 29 August 1710 to all Hindus to shave off their beards.

Banda Singh was in Uttar Pradesh when the Moghal army under the orders of Munim Khan marched to Sirhind and before the return of Banda Singh, they had already taken Sirhind and the areas around it. The Sikhs therefore moved to Lohgarh for their final battle. The Sikhs defeated the army but reinforcements were called and they laid siege on the fort with 60,000 troops. Gulab Singh dressed himself in the garments of Banda Singh and seated himself in his place. Banda Singh left the fort at night and went to a secret place in the hills and Chamba forests. The failure of the army to kill or catch Banda Singh shocked Emperor, Bahadur Shah and On 10 December 1710 he ordered that wherever a Sikh was found, he should be murdered. The Emperor became mentally disturbed and died on 18 February 1712.

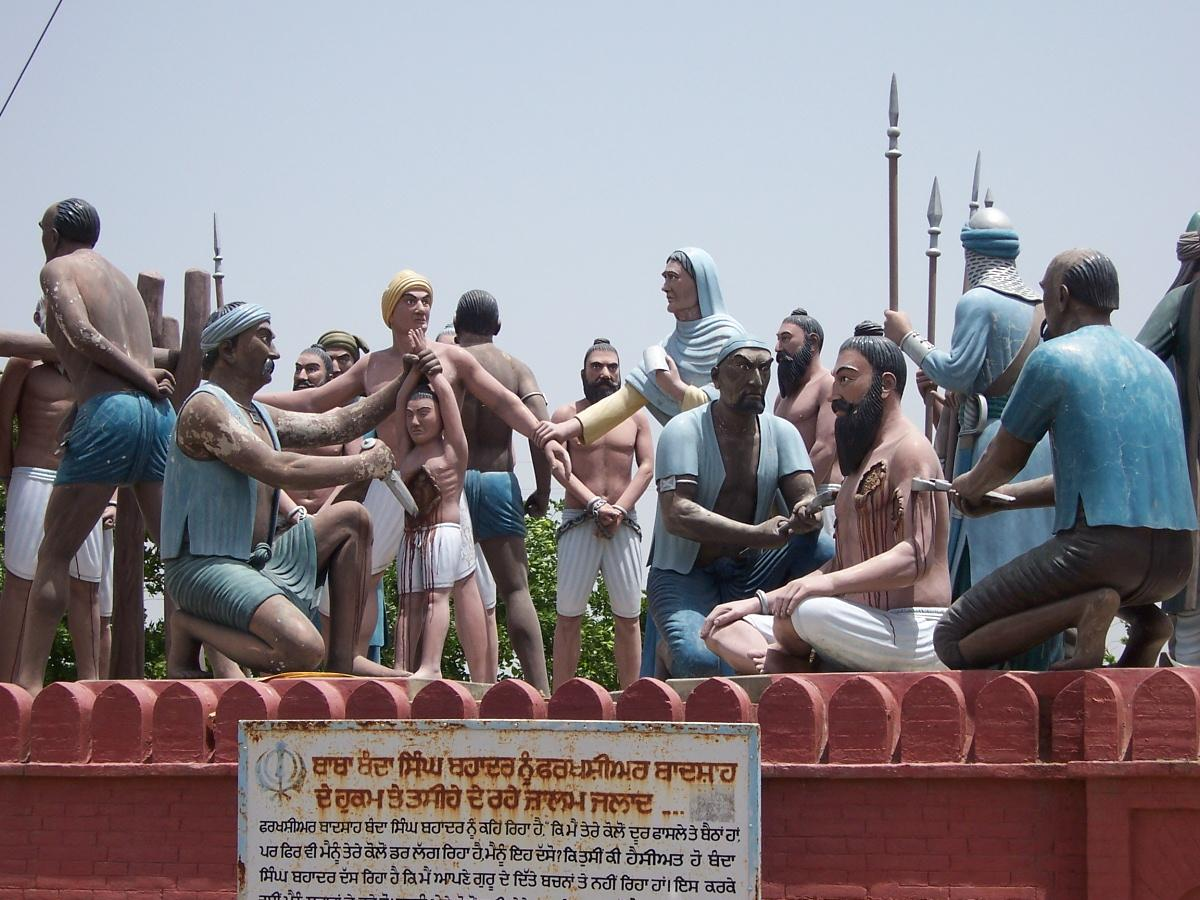
Sculpture at Mehdiana Sahib of the execution of Banda Singh Bahadur in 1716 by the Mughals.

Banda Singh Bahadur wrote Hukamnamas to the Sikhs telling them to get themselves reorganised and join him at once. In 1711 the Sikhs gathered near Kiratpur Sahib and defeated Raja Bhim Chand, who was responsible for organising all the Hill Rajas against Guru Gobind Singh and instigating battles with him. After Bhim Chand’s dead the other Hill Rajas accepted their subordinate status and paid revenues to Banda Singh. While Bahadur Shah's 4 sons were killing themselves for the throne of the Mughal Emperor Banda Singh Bahadur recaptured Sadhura and Lohgarh. Farrukh Siyar, the next Moghal Emperor, appointed Abdus Samad Khan as the governor of Lahore and Zakaria Khan, Abdus Samad Khan's son, the Faujdar of Jammu. In 1713 the Sikhs left Lohgarh and Sadhura and went to the remote hills of Jammu and where they built Dera Baba Banda Singh. During this time Sikhs were being hunted down especially by pathans in the Gurdaspur region. Banda Singh came out and captured Kalanaur and Batala which rebuked Farrukh Siyar to issue Mughal and Hindu officials and chiefs to proceed with their troops to Lahore to reinforce his army.

In March 1715, Banda Singh Bahadur was in the village of Gurdas Nangal, Gurdaspur, Punjab, when the army under the rule of Samad Khan, the Mogual king of Delhi laid siege to the Sikh forces. The Sikhs fought and defended the small fort for eight months. On 7 December 1715 Banda Singh starving soldiers were captured.

==== Execution ====
On 7 December 1715 Banda Singh Bahadur was captured from the Gurdas Nangal fort and put in an iron cage and the remaining Sikhs were captured, chained. The Sikhs were brought to Delhi in a procession with the 780 Sikh prisoners, 2,000 Sikh heads hung on spears, and 700 cartloads of heads of slaughtered Sikhs used to terrorise the population. They were put in the Delhi fort and pressured to give up their faith and become Muslims. On their firm refusal all of them were ordered to be executed. Every day, 100 Sikhs were brought out of the fort and murdered in public daily, which went on approximately seven days. After 3 months of confinement On 9 June 1716, Banda Singh’s eyes were gouged, his limbs were severed, his skin removed, and then he was killed.

=== Sikhs retreat to jungles ===
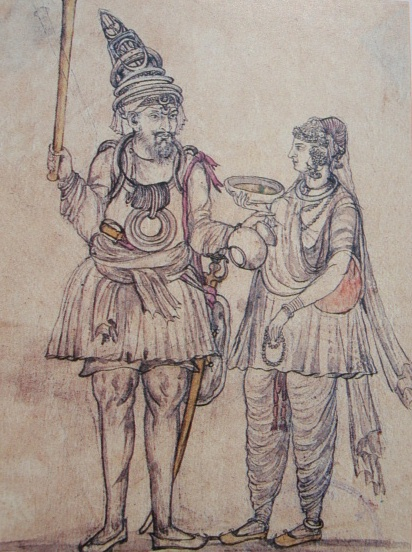
Nihang Singh and Nihang Singhani.

In 1716 Farrukh Siyar, the Mughal Emperor, issued all Sikhs to be converted to Islam or die, an attempt to destroy the power of the Sikhs and to exterminate the community as a whole. A reward was offered for the head of every Sikh. For a time it appeared as if the boast of Farrukh Siyar to wipe out the name of Sikhs from the land was going to be fulfilled. Hundreds of Sikhs were brought in from their villages and executed, and thousands who had joined merely for the sake of booty cut off their hair and went back to the Hindu fold again. Besides these there were some Sikhs who had not yet received the baptism of Guru Gobind Singh, nor did they feel encouraged to do so, as the adoption of the outward symbols meant courting death.

After a few years Adbus Samad Khan, the Governor of Lahore, Punjab and other Mughal officers began to pursue Sikhs less and thus the Sikhs came back to the villages and started going to the Gurdwaras again, which were managed by Udasis when the Sikhs were in hiding. The Sikhs celebrated Bandhi Chorh Diwas and Vaisakhi at Harmandir Sahib. The Khalsa had been split into two major factions Bandia Khalsa and Tat Khalsa and tensions were spewing between the two.

Under the authority of Mata Sundari Bhai Mani Singh become the Jathedar of the Harminder Sahib and a leader of the Sikhs and the Bandia Khalsa and Tat Khalsa joined by Bhai Mani Singh into the Tat Khalsa and after the event from that day the Bandeis assumed a quieter role and practically disappeared from the pages of history. A police post was established at Amritsar to keep a check on the Sikhs. Mani Singh was killed by cutting each of his body joint .

Abdus Samad Khan, was transferred to Multan in 1726, and his more energetic Son, Zakaria Khan, also known as Khan Bahadur, was appointed to take his place as the governor of Lahore. In 1726, Tarra Singh of Wan, a renowned Sikh leader, and his 26 men was killed after Governor Zakaria Khan, sent 2200 horses, 40 zamburaks, 5 elephants and 4 cannons, under the command of his deputy, Momin Khan. The murder of Tarra Singh spread across the Sikhs in Punjab and the Sikhs. Finding no Sikhs around, the government falsely announced in each village with the beat of a drum, that all Sikhs had been eliminated but the common people knew the truth that this was not the case. The Sikhs did not face the army directly, because of their small numbers, but adopted dhai phut guerrilla warfare (hit and run) tactics.

Under the leadership of Nawab Kapoor Singh and Jathedar Darbara Singh, in attempt to weaken their enemy looted many of the Mughals caravans and supplies and for some years no money from revenue could reach the government treasury. When the forces of government tried to punish the outlaws, they were unable to contact them, as the Sikhs did not live in houses or forts, but ran away to their rendezvous in forests or other places difficult to access.

=== Nawab Kapur Singh ===
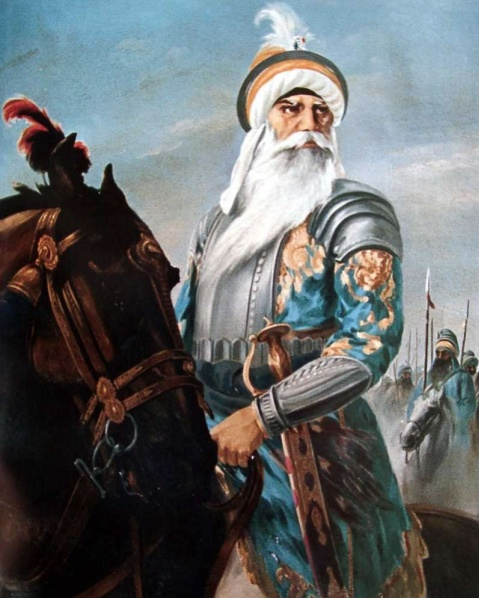
Nawab Kapur Singh

Nawab Kapur Singh was born in 1697 in a village near Sheikhupura in what is today Punjab, Pakistan. He was a volunteer at Darbar Sahib Amritsar. His was cleaning shoes of Sangat that come to pay their respect to Darbar Sahib, work in the kitchen to feed the Sangat. He was given a jagir in 1733 when the Governor of Punjab offered the Sikhs the Nawabship (ownership of an estate) and a valuable royal robe, the Khalsa accepted it all in the name of Kapur Singh. Henceforth, he became known as Nawab Kapur Singh. In 1748 he would organise the early Sikh Misls into the Dal Khalsa (Budda Dal and Tarna Dal).

Nawab Kapur Singh’s father was Chaudhri Daleep Singh as a boy he memorised Gurbani Nitnem and was taught the arts of war. Kapur Singh was attracted to the Khalsa Panth after the execution of Bhai Tara Singh, of the village of Van, in 1726.

==== Extensive looting of the Mughal government ====
The Khalsa held a meeting to make plans to respond to the state repression against the people of the region and they decided to take possession of government money and weapons in order to weaken the administration, and to equip themselves to face the everyday attacks. Kapur Singh was assigned to plan and execute these projects.

Information was obtained that money was being transported from Multan to the Lahore treasure; the Khalsa looted the money and took over the arms and horses of the guards. They then took over one lakh rupees from the Kasoor estate treasury going from Kasur to Lahore. Next they captured a caravan from Afghanistan region which resulted in capturing numerous arms and horses.

The Khalsa seized a number of vilayati (Superior Central Asian) horses from Murtaza Khan was going to Delhi in the jungle of Kahna Kachha. Some additional war supplies were being taken from Afghanistan to Delhi and Kapur Singh organised an attack to capture them. In another attack, the Khalsa recovered gold and silver which was intended to be carried from Peshawar to Delhi by Jaffar Khan, a royal official.

==== Government sides with the Khalsa ====
The Mughal rulers and the commanders alongside the Delhi government lost all hope of defeating the Sikhs through repression and decided to develop another strategy, Zakaria Khan, the Governor of Lahore, went to Delhi where it was decided to befriend the Sikhs and rule in cooperation with them and in 1733 the Delhi rulers withdrew all orders against the Khalsa. The Sikhs were now permitted to own land and to move freely without any state violence against them. To co-operate with the Khalsa Panth, and win the goodwill of the people, the government sent an offer of an estate and Nawabship through a famous Lahore Sikh, Subeg Singh. The Khalsa did not wanted to rule freely and not to be under the rule of a subordinate position. However this offer was eventually accepted and this title was bestowed on Kapur Singh after it was sanctified by the touch of Five Khalsas feet. Thus Kapur Singh became Nawab Kapur Singh. Kapur Singh guided the Sikhs in strengthening themselves and preaching Gurmat to the people. He knew that peace would be short-lived. He encouraged people to freely visit their Gurdwaras and meet their relatives in the villages.

==== Dal Khalsa ====
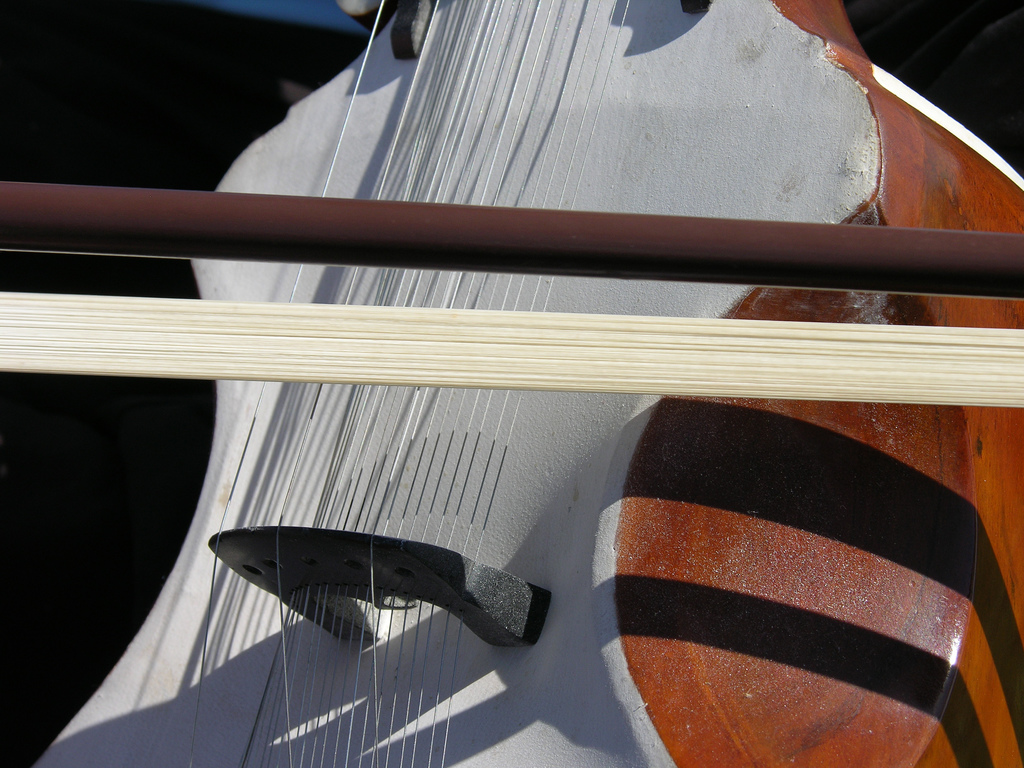
Ragis recite Sikh scriptures alongside playing portable instruments such as the Dilruba.

The Khalsa reorganised themselves into two divisions, the younger generation would be part of the Taruna Dal, which provided the main fighting force, while the Sikhs above the age of forty years would be a part of the Budha Dal, which provided the responsibility of the management of Gurdwaras and Gurmat preaching. The Budha Dal would be responsible to keep track of the movements of government forces, plan their defense strategies, and they provide a reserve fighting force for the Taruna Dal.

The following measures were established by Nawab Kapur Singh:

- All money obtained from anywhere by any Jatha should be deposited in the Common Khalsa Fund.
- The Khalsa should have their common Langer for both the Dals.
- Every Sikh should respect the orders of his Jathedar. Anyone going anywhere would get permission from him and report to him on his return.

==== 5 Sikh Misls of the Dal Khalsa ====
The Taruna Dal quickly increased to more than 12,000 recruits and it soon became difficult to manage the house and feeding of such a large number of people at one place. It was then decided to have five divisions of the Dal, each to draw rations from the central stocks and cook its own langar. These five divisions were stationed around the five sarovars (sacred pools) around Amritsar they were Ramsar, Bibeksar, Lachmansar, Kaulsar and Santokhsar. The divisions later became known as Misls and their number increased to eleven. Each took over and ruled a different region of the Punjab. Collectively they called themselves the Sarbat Khalsa.

==== Preparing Jassa Singh Ahluwalia for leadership ====
Being the leader of the Khalsa Nawab Kapur Singh was given an additional responsibility by Mata Sundari, the wife of Guru Gobind Singh sent Kapur Singh the young Jassa Singh Ahluwalia and told him that Ahluwalia was like a son to her and that the Nawab should raise him like an ideal Sikh. Ahluwalia under the guidance of Kapur Singh, was given a good education in Gurbani and thorough training in managing the Sikh affairs. Later Jassa Singh Ahluwalia would become an important role in leading the Sikhs to self-rule.

==== State oppression ====
In 1735, the rulers of Lahore attacked and repossessed the jagir (estate) given to the Sikhs only two years before however Nawab Kapur Singh in reaction decided the whole Punjab should be taken over by the Sikhs. This decision was taken against heavy odds but was endorsed by the Khalsa and all the Sikhs assured him of their full cooperation in his endeavor for self-rule. Zakariya Khan Bahadur sent roaming squads to hunt and kill the Sikhs. Orders were issued to all administrators down to the village level officials to seek Sikhs, murder them, get them arrested, or report their whereabouts to the governments. One year's wages were offered to anyone who would murder a Sikh and deliver his head to the police station. Rewards were also promised to those who helped arrest Sikhs. Persons providing food or shelter to Sikhs or helping them in any way were severely punished.

This was the period when the Sikhs were sawed into pieces, burnt alive, their heads crushed with hammers and young children were pierced with spears before their mother’s eyes. To keep their morale high, the Sikhs developed their own high-sounding terminologies and slogans: For example. Tree leaves boiled for food were called ‘green dish’; the parched chickpeas were called ‘almonds’; the Babul tree was a ‘rose’; a blind man was a ‘brave man’, getting on the back of a buffalo was ‘riding an elephant’.

The army pursued the Sikhs hiding near the hills and forced them to cross the rivers and seek safety in the Malwa tract. When Kapur Singh reached Patiala he met Maharaja Baba Ala Singh who then took Amrit and Kapur Singh helped him increase the boundaries of his state. In 1736 the Khalsa attacked Sirhind, where the two younger sons of Guru Gobind Singh were killed. The Khalsa took over the city, the took over the treasury and they established the Gurdwaras at the historical places and withdrew. Near Amritsar, the Lahore government sent troops to attack the Sikhs. Kapur Singh entrusted the treasury to Jassa Singh Ahluwalia and engaged the enemy, allowing Jassa Singh to lead a safe retreat to Tarn Taran Sahib. Kapur Singh requested reinforcements from the Tauna Dal. After a day of fighting, he launched a surprise attack from trenches, killing three generals and many Mughal officers, forcing the Mughal army to retreat to Lahore.

Zakaria Khan called his advisers to plan another strategy to deal with the Sikhs. It was suggested that the Sikhs should not be allowed to visit the Amrit Sarovar, which was believed to be the fountain of their lives and source of their strength. Strong contingents were posted around the city and all entries to Harmandir Sahib were checked. The Sikhs, however, risking their lives, continued to pay their respects to the holy place and take a dip in the Sarovar (sacred pool) in the dark of the night. When Kapur Singh went to Amritsar he had a fight with Qadi Abdul Rehman. He had declared that Sikhs the so-called lions, would not dare to come to Amritsar and face him. In the ensuing fight Abdul Rehman was killed. When his son tried to save him, he too died. In 1738 Bhai Mani Singh was executed.

==== Sikhs attack Nader Shah ====
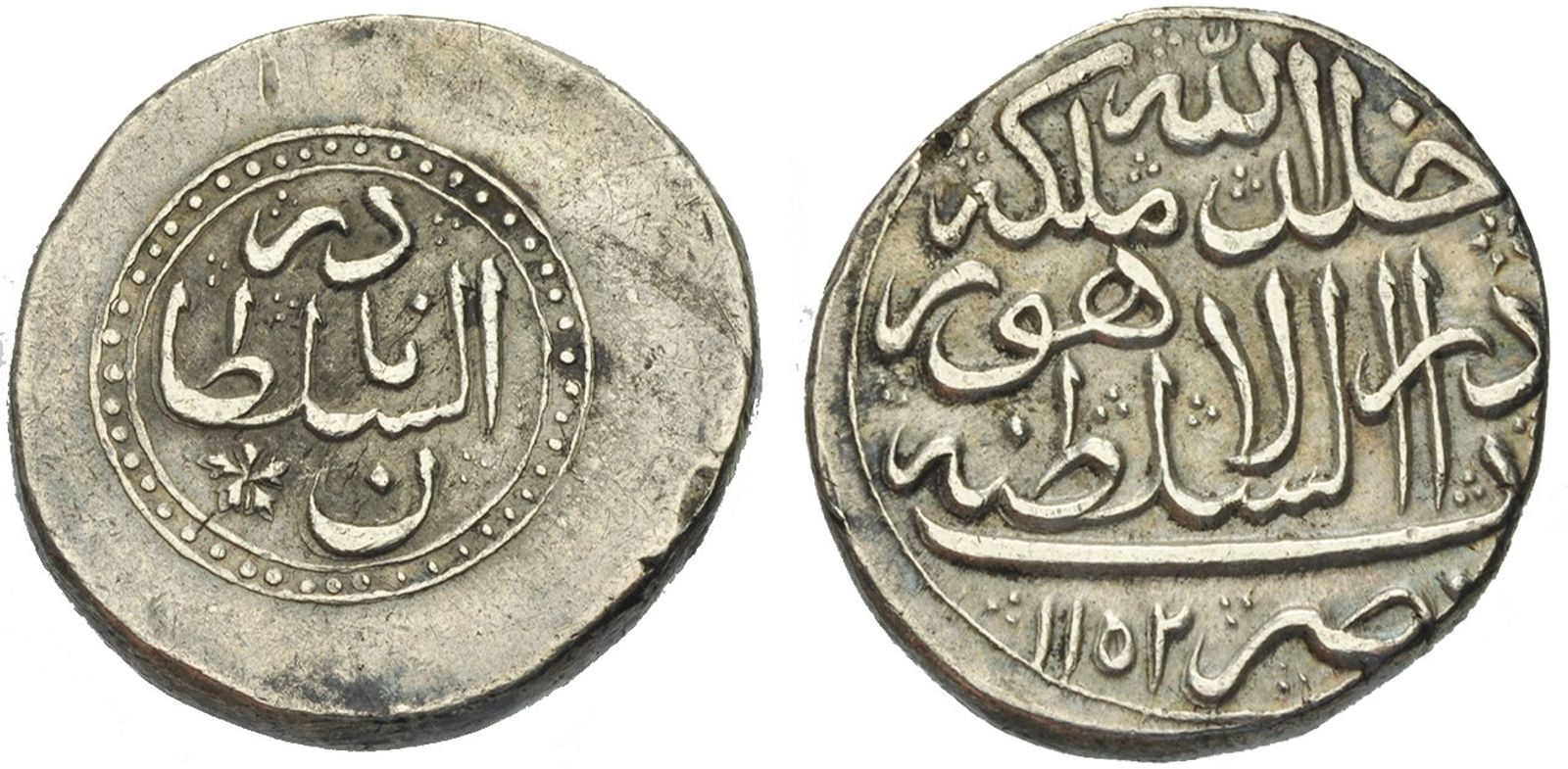
Afsharids. Nadir Shah. As king, AH 1148-1160, AD 1736-1747. AR Double-Rupi (26.5mm, 22.96 g, 9h). Lahore mint. Dated AH 1152 (AD 1739–40). Near EF.

In 1739 Nader Shah of the Turkic Afsharid dynasty invaded and looted the treasury of the Indian subcontinent. Nader Shah killed more than 100,000 people in Delhi and carried off all of the gold and valuables. He added to his caravan hundreds of elephants and horses, along with thousands of young women and Indian artisans. When Kapur Singh learned of this, he decided to warn Nader Shah that if not the local rulers, then the Sikhs would protect the innocent women of Muslims and Hindus from being sold as slaves. While crossing The river Chenab, the Sikhs attacked the rear end of the caravan, freed many of the women, freed the artisans, and recovered part of the treasure.

==== Sikhs kill Massa Rangar ====
Massa Ranghar, the Mughal official, had seized Amritsar. While smoking and drinking in the Harmandir Sahib, he watched the dances of nautch girls. The Sikhs who had moved to Bikaner, a desert region, for safety, were outraged to hear of this desecration. In 1740 Sukha Singh and Mehtab Singh, went to Amritsar disguised as revenue collectors. They tied their horses outside, walked straight into the Harmandir Sahib, cut off his head, and took it with them.

==== Sikhs loot Abdus Samad Khan ====
Abdus Samad Khan, a senior Mughal royal commander, was sent from Delhi to subdue the Sikhs. Kapur Singh learned of this scheme and planned his own strategy accordingly. As soon as the army was sent out to hunt for the Sikhs, a Jatha of commandos disguised as messengers of Khan went to the armory. The commander there was told that Abdus Samad Khan was holding the Sikhs under siege and wanted him with all his force to go and arrest them. The few guards left behind were then overpowered by the Sikhs, and all the arms and ammunition were looted and brought to the Sikh camp.

== Age of Revolution (1748–1799 CE) ==
=== Mughal-Sikh Battles ===
Abdus Samad Khan sent many roaming squads to search for and kill Sikhs. He was responsible for the torture and murder of Bhai Mani Singh, the head Granthi of Harmandir Sahib. Samad Khan was afraid that Sikhs would kill him so he remained far behind the fighting lines. Kapur Singh had a plan to get him. During the battle Kapur Singh ordered his men to retreat drawing the fighting army with them. He then wheeled around and fell upon the rear of the army. Samad Khan and his guards were lying dead on the field within hours. The Punjab governor also took extra precautions for safety against the Sikhs. He started to live in the fort. He would not even dare to visit the mosque outside the fort for prayers.

On the request of the Budha Dal members, Kapur Singh visited Patiala. The sons of Sardar Ala Singh, the founder and Maharajah of the Patiala state, gave him a royal welcome. Kapur Singh subdued all local administrators around Delhi who were not behaving well towards their people.

Zakaria Khan died in 1745. His successor tightened the security around Amritsar. Kapur Singh planned to break the siege of Amritsar. Jassa Singh Ahluwalia was made the commander of the attacking Sikh forces. In 1748, the Sikhs attacked. Jassa Singh Ahluwalia, with his commandos behind him, dashed to the army commander and cut him into two with his sword. The commander's nephew was also killed.

=== The Khalsa advanced military strategies ===
The Sikhs built their first fort Ram Rauni at Amritsar in 1748. In December 1748, Governor Mir Mannu had to take his forces outside of Lahore to stop the advance of Ahmad Shah Abdali. The Sikhs quickly overpowered the police defending the station in Lahore and confiscated all of their weapons and released all the prisoners. Nawab Kapur Singh told the sheriff to inform the Governor that, the sheriff of God, the True Emperor, came and did what he was commanded to do. Before the policemen could report the matter to the authorities, or the army could be called in, the Khalsa were already riding their horses back to the forest. Nawab Kapur Singh died in 1753.

=== Jassa Singh Ahluwalia ===
Jassa Singh Ahluwalia was born in 1718. His father, Badar Singh, died when Ahluwalia was only four years old. His mother took him to Mata Sundari, the wife of Guru Gobind Singh when Ahluwalia was young. Mata Sundri was impressed by his melodious singing of hymns and kept the Ahluwalia near her. Later Jassa Singh Ahluwalia was adopted by Nawab Kapoor Singh, then the leader of the Sikh nation. Ahluwalia followed all Sikh qualities required for a leader Ahluwalia would sing Asa di Var in the morning and it was appreciated by all the Dal Khalsa and Ahluwalia kept busy doing seva (selfless service). He became very popular with the Sikhs. He used to tie his turban in the Mughal fashion as he grew up in Delhi. Ahluwalia learned horseback riding and swordsmanship from expert teachers.

In 1748, Jassa Singh Ahluwalia became the supreme commander of all the Misls and was given the title Sultanul Kaum (King of the Nation). As leader of the Ahluwalia Misl and later all the Misls under Dal Khalsa, he played a key role in leading the Khalsa to self-rule in Punjab. In 1761, under his leadership, the Dal Khalsa captured Lahore, the capital of Punjab, for the first time. They were the masters of Lahore for a few months and minted their own Nanakshahi rupee coin in the name of 'Guru Nanak – Guru Gobind Singh'.

==== Chhota Ghalughara (The Lesser Massacre) ====
In 1746 about seven thousand Sikhs were killed and three thousand to fifteen thousand Sikhs were taken prisoner by order of the Mughal Empire when Zakaria Khan, The Governor of Lahore, and Lakhpat Rai, the Divan (Revenue Minister) of Zakaria Khan, sent military squads to kill the Sikhs.

Jaspat Rai, a jagirdar (landlord) of the Eminabad area and also the brother of Lakhpat Rai, faced the Sikhs in a battle one of the Sikhs held the tail of his elephant and got on his back from behind and with a quick move, he chopped off his head. Seeing their master killed, the troops fled. Lakhpat Rai, after this incident, committed himself to destroying the Sikhs.

Through March–May 1746, a new wave of violence was started against the Sikhs with all of the resources available to the Mughal government, village officials were ordered to co-operate in the expedition. Zakaria Khan issued the order that no one was to give any help or shelter to Sikhs and warned that severe consequences would be taken against anyone disobeying these orders. Local people were forcibly employed to search for the Sikhs to be killed by the army. Lakhpat Rai ordered Sikh places of worship to be destroyed and their holy books burnt. Information about including Jassa Singh Ahluwalia and a large body of Sikhs were camping in riverbeds in the Gurdaspur district (Kahnuwan tract). Zakaria Khan managed to have 3,000 Sikhs of these Sikhs captured and later got them beheaded in batches at Nakhas (site of the horse market outside the Delhi gate). Sikhs raised a memorial shrine known as the Shahidganj (the treasure house of martyrs) at that place latter.

In 1747, Shah Nawaz took over as Governor of Lahore. To please the Sikhs, Lakhpat Rai was put in prison by the new Governor. Lakhpat Rai received severe punishment and was eventually killed by the Sikhs.

==== Reclaiming Amritsar ====
In 1747 Salabat Khan, a newly appointed Mughal commander, placed police around Amritsar and built observation posts to spot and kill Sikhs coming to the Amrit Sarovar for a holy dip. Jassa Singh Ahluwalia and Nawab Kapoor Singh led the Sikhs to Amritsar, and Salabat Khan was killed by Ahluwalia, and his nephew was killed by the arrow of Kapur Singh. The Sikhs restored Harmandir Sahib and celebrated their Diwali gathering there.

==== Reorganisation of the Misls ====
In 1748 all the Misls joined themselves under one command and on the advice of the aging Jathedar Nawab Kapoor Singh Jassa Singh Ahluwalia was made the supreme leader. They also decided to declare that the Punjab belonged to them and they would be the sovereign rulers of their state. The Sikhs also built their first fort, called Ram Rauni, at Amritsar.

==== Khalsa side with the Government ====
Adina Beg, the Faujdar (garrison commander) of Jalandhar, sent a message to the Dal Khalsa chief to cooperate with him in the civil administration, and he wanted a meeting to discuss the matter. This was seen as a trick to disarm the Sikhs and keep them under government control. Jassa Singh Ahluwalia replied that their meeting place would be the battleground and the discussion would be carried out by their swords. Beg attacked the Ram Rauni fort at Amritsar and besieged the Sikhs there. Dewan Kaura Mal advised the Governor to lift the siege and prepare the army to protect the state from the Durrani invader, Ahmed Shah Abdali. Kaura Mal had a part of the revenue of Patti area given to the Sikhs for the improvement and management of Harmandir Sahib, Amritsar.

Kaura Mal had to go to Multan to quell a rebellion there. He asked the Sikhs for help and they agreed to join him. After the victory at Multan, Kaura came to pay his respects to the Darbar Sahib, and offered 11,000 rupees and built Gurdwara Bal-Leela; He also spent 3,000,000 rupees to build a Sarover (holy water) at Nankana Sahib, the birthplace of Guru Nanak Dev. In 1752, Kaura Mall was killed in a battle with Ahmed Shah Abdali and state policy towards the Sikhs quickly changed. Mir Mannu, the Governor, started hunting Sikhs again. He arrested many men and women, put them in prison and tortured them. In November 1753, when he went to kill the Sikhs hiding in the fields, they showered him with a hail of bullets and Mannu fell from the horse and the animal dragged him to death. The Sikhs immediately proceeded to Lahore, attacked the prison, and got all the prisoners released and led them to safety in the forests.

==== Harmandir Sahib demolished in 1757 ====
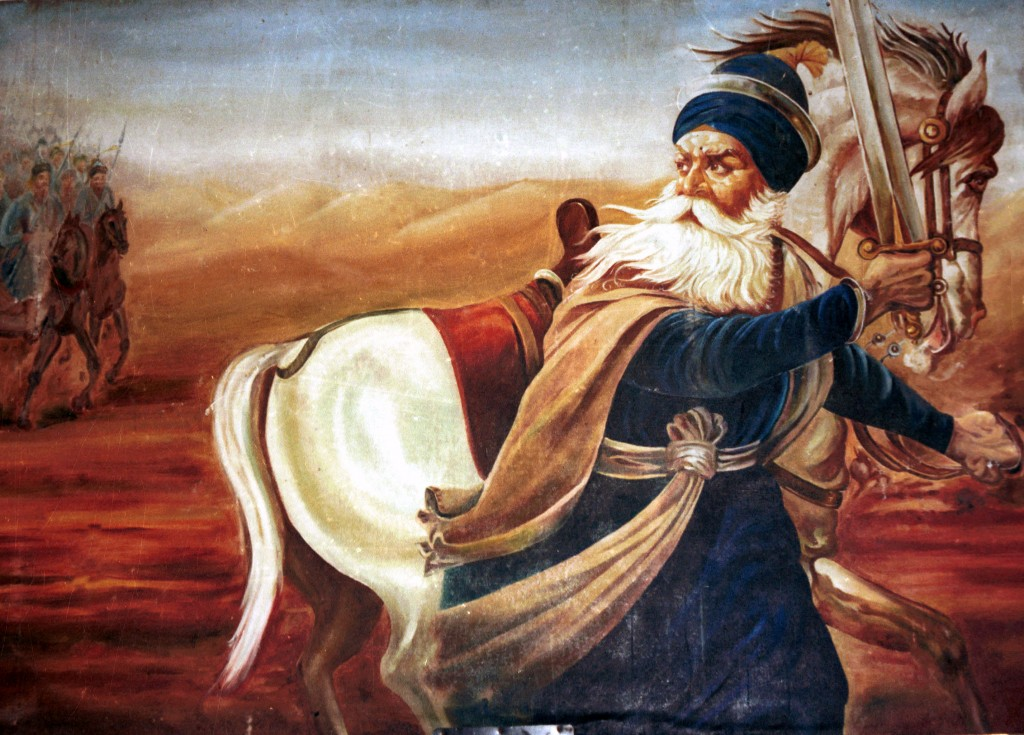
Baba Deep Singh Shaheed

In May 1757, the Afghan Durrani general of Ahmad Shah Abdali, Jahan Khan attacked Amritsar with a huge army and the Sikhs because of their small numbers decided to withdraw to the forests. Their fort, Ram Rauni, was demolished, Harmandir Sahib was also demolished, and the army desecrated the Sarovar (Holy water) by filling it with debris and dead animals. Baba Deep Singh made history when he cut through 20,000 Durrani soldiers and reached Harmandir Sahib, Amritsar.

==== The Khalsa territorial gains ====
Adina Beg did not pay revenues to the government so the Governor dismissed him and appointed a new Faujdar (garrison commander) in his place. The army was sent to arrest him and this prompted Adina Beg to request Sikh help. The Sikhs took advantage of the situation and to weaken the government, they fought against the army. One of the commanders was killed by the Sikhs and the other deserted. Later, the Sikhs attacked Jalandhar and thus became the rulers of all the tracts between Sutlej and Beas rivers, called Doaba. Instead of roaming in the forests now they were ruling the cities.

The Sikhs started bringing more areas under their control and realising revenue from them. In 1758, joined by the Mahrattas, they conquered Lahore and arrested many Afghan soldiers who were responsible for filling the Amrit Sarovar with debris a few months earlier. They were brought to Amritsar and made to clean the Sarovar (holy water). After the cleaning of the Sarovar, the soldiers were allowed to go home with a warning that they should not do that again.

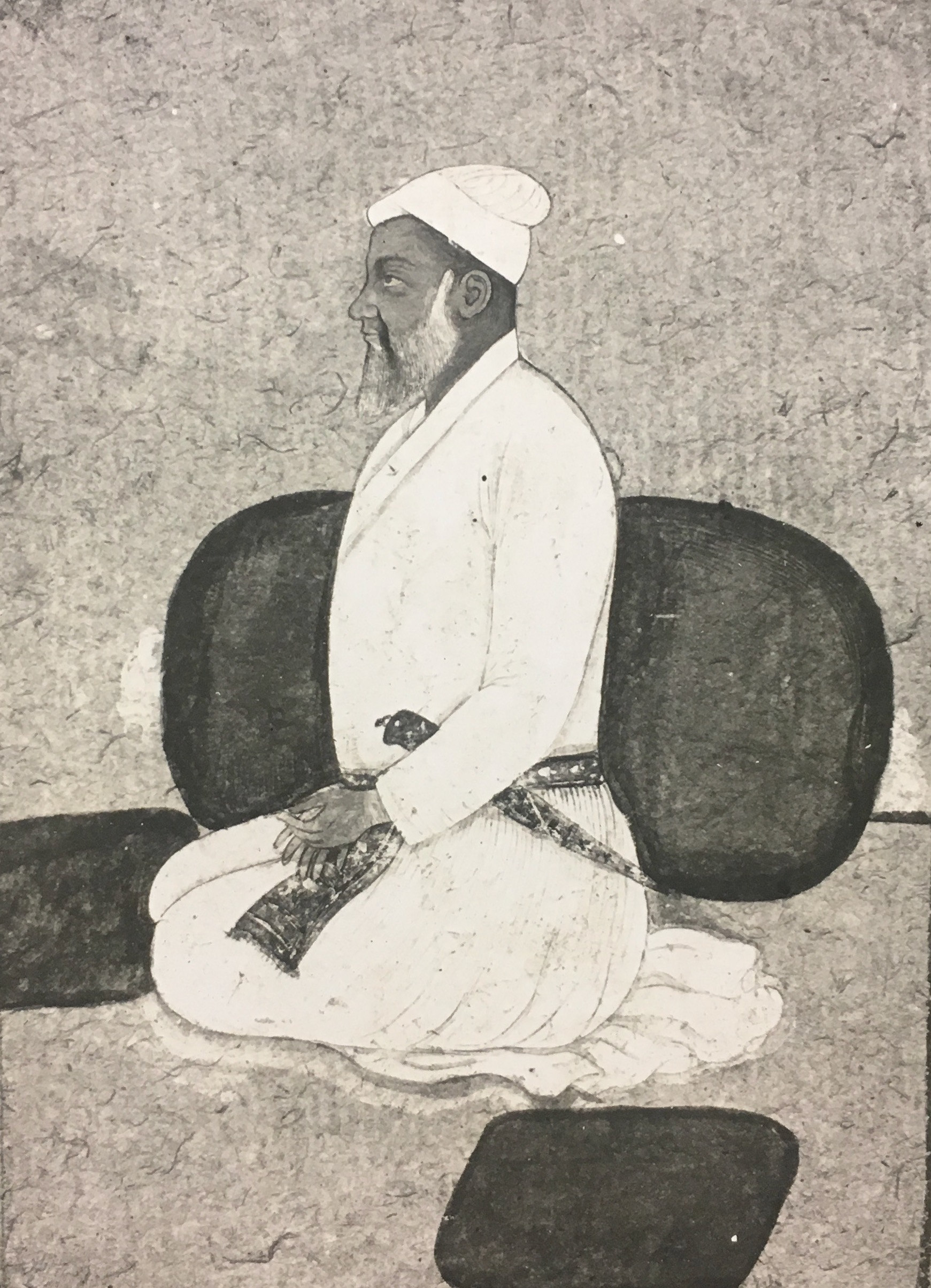
Adina Beg Khan

Ahmed Shah Abdali came again in October 1759 to loot Delhi. The Sikhs gave him a good fight and killed more than 2,000 of his soldiers. Instead of getting involved with the Sikhs, he made a rapid advance to Delhi. The Khalsa decided to collect revenues from Lahore to prove to the people that the Sikhs were the rulers of the state. The Governor of Lahore closed the gates of the city and did not come out to fight against them. The Sikhs laid siege to the city. After a week, the Governor agreed to pay 30,000 rupees to the Sikhs.

Ahmed Shah Abdali returned from Delhi in March 1761 with much gold and more than 2,000 girls as prisoners who were to be sold to the Afghans in Kabul. When Abdali was crossing the river Beas, the Sikhs swiftly fell upon them. They freed the women prisoners and escorted them back to their homes. The Sikhs seized Lahore in September 1761, after Abdali returned to Kabul.

The Khalsa minted their coins in the name of Guru Nanak Dev. Sikhs, as rulers of the city, received full cooperation from the people. After becoming the Governor of Lahore, Punjab Jassa Singh Ahluwalia was given the title of Sultan-ul-Kaum (King of the Nation).

==== Wadda Ghalughara (The Great Massacre) ====
In the winter of 1762, after losing his loot from Delhi to the Sikhs, The Durrani emperor, Ahmad Shah Abdali brought a big, well equipped army to finish the Sikhs forever. Sikhs were near Ludhiana on their way to the forests and dry areas of the south and Abdali moved from Lahore very quickly and caught the Sikhs totally unprepared. They had their women, children and old people with them. As many as 30,000 Sikhs are said to have been murdered by the army. Jassa Singh Ahluwalia himself received about two dozen wounds. Fifty chariots were necessary to transport the heads of the victims to Lahore. The Sikhs call this Wadda Ghalughara (The Great Massacre).

==== Harmandir Sahib desecrated in 1762 ====
Ahmad Shah Abdali, fearing Sikh retaliation, sent messages that he was willing to assign some areas to the Sikhs to be ruled by them. Jassa Singh Ahluwalia rejected his offers and told him that Sikhs own Punjab and they do not recognise his authority at all. Abdali went to Amritsar and destroyed the Harmandir Sahib again by filling it up with gunpowder hoping to eliminate the source of "life" of the Sikhs. While Abdali was demolishing the Harminder Sahib a he was hit on the nose with a brick; later in 1772 Abdali died of cancer from the 'gangrenous ulcer' that consumed his nose. Within a few months the Sikhs attacked Sirhind and moved to Amritsar.

==== Sikhs retake Lahore ====
In 1764 the Sikhs shot dead Zain Khan Sirhindi Durrani Governor of Sirhind, and the regions around Sirhind were divided among the Sikh Misldars and money recovered from the treasury were used to rebuild the Harmandir Sahib. Gurdwara Fatehgarh Sahib was built in Sirhind, at the location the two younger sons of Guru Gobind Singh were killed. The Sikhs started striking Govind Shahi coins and in 1765 they took over Lahore again.

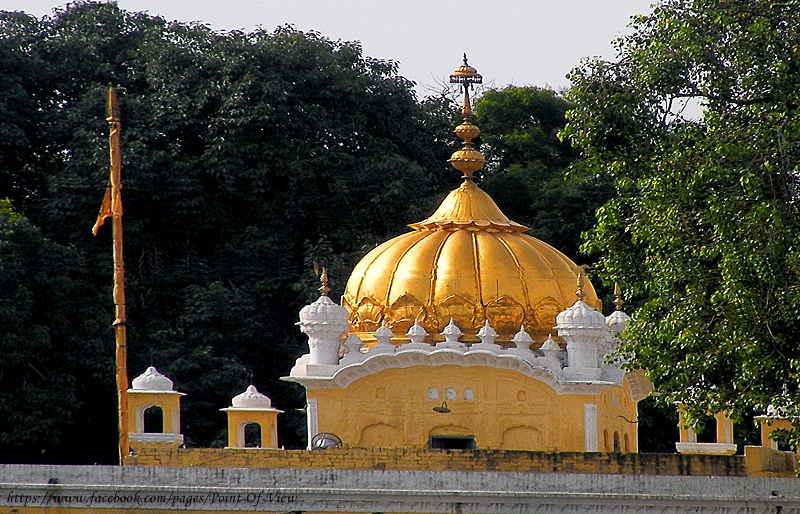
Gurudwara Dera Sahib, Lahore

In 1767 when Ahmed Shah Abdali came again he sent messages to the Sikhs for their cooperation. He offered them the governorship of Punjab but was rejected. The Sikhs using repeated guerrilla attacks took away his caravan of 1,000 camels loaded with fruits from Kabul. The Sikhs were again in control of the areas between Sutlej and Ravi. After Abdali’s departure to Kabul, Sikhs crossed the Sutlej and brought Sirhind and other areas right up to Delhi, entire Punjab under their control.

Shah Alam II, the Mughal Emperor of Delhi was staying away in Allahabad, ordered his commander Zabita Khan to fight the Sikhs. Zabita made a truce with them instead and then was dismissed from Alam’s service. Zabita Khan then became a Sikh and was given a new name, Dharam Singh.

Qadi Nur Mohammed, who came to Punjab with Ahmad Shah Abdali and was present during many Sikh battles writes about the Sikhs:

They do not kill a woman, a child, or a coward running away from the fight. They do not rob any person nor do they take away the ornaments of a woman, be she a queen or a slave girl. They commit no adultery, rather they respect the women of even their enemies. They always shun thieves and adulterers and in generosity they surpass Hatim."

==== Peace in Amritsar ====
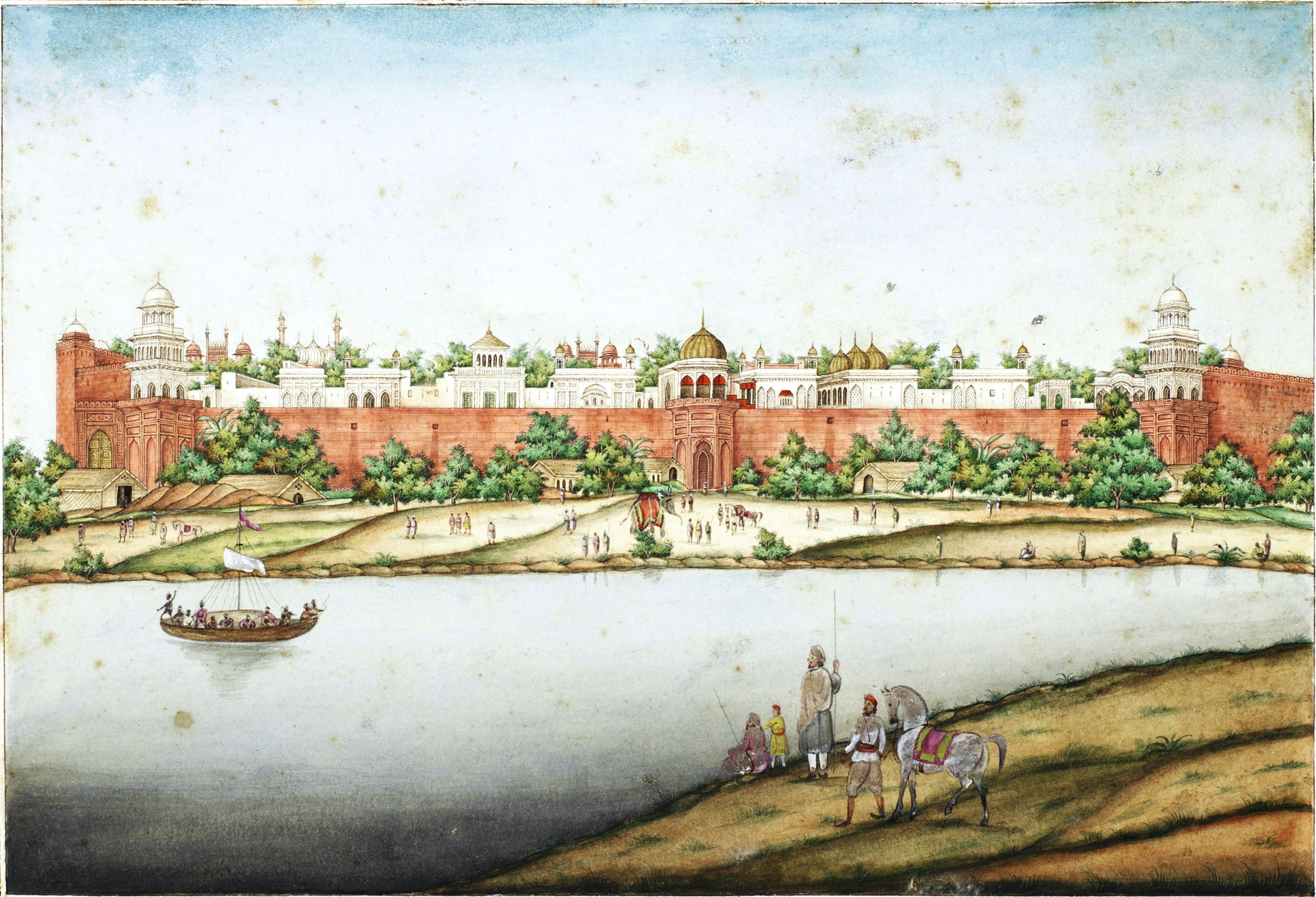
In 1783, the Sikhs captured the Red Fort, Delhi.

Ahmad Shah Abdali, fearing the Sikhs, did not follow his normal route through Punjab while he returned to Kabul. Jassa Singh Ahluwalia did not add more areas to his Misl. Instead, whenever any wealth or villages came into the hands of the Sikhs he distributed them among the Jathedars of all the Misls. Ahluwalia passed his last years in Amritsar. With the resources available to him, he repaired all the buildings, improved the management of the Gurdwaras, and provided better civic facilities to the residents of Amritsar. He wanted every Sikh to take Amrit before joining the Dal Khalsa.

Ahluwalia died in 1783 and was cremated near Amritsar. There is a city block, Katra Ahluwalia, in Amritsar named after him. This block was assigned to his Misl in honor of his having stayed there and protected the city of Amritsar.

=== Sardar Jassa Singh Ramgarhia ===
Jassa Singh Ramgarhia played an active role in Jassa Singh Alhuwalia’s army. He founded the Ramgarhia Misl and played a major role in the battles of the Khalsa Panth. He suffered about two dozen wounds during the Wadda Ghalughara. Jassa Singh Ramgarhia was the son of Giani Bhagwan Singh and was born in 1723. They lived in the village of Ichogil, near Lahore. His grandfather took Amrit during the lifetime of Guru Gobind Singh, and joined him in many battles; he joined the forces of Banda Singh Bahadur. Ramgarhia was the oldest of five brothers. When Ramgarhia was young he had memorised Nitnem hymns and took Amrit.

==== Award of an Estate ====
In 1733, Zakaria Khan, the Governor of Punjab, needed help to protect himself from the Iranian invader, Nader Shah. He offered the Sikhs an estate and a royal robe. The Sikhs in the name of Kapur Singh accepted it. After the battle Zakaria Khan gave five villages to the Sikhs in reward for the bravery of Giani Bhagwan Singh, father of Ramgarhia, who died in the battle. Village Vallah was awarded to Ramgarhia, where Ramgarhia gained the administrative experience required to become a Jathedar (leader) of the Sikhs. During this period of peace with the government, the Sikhs built their fort, Ram Rauni, in Amritsar. Zakaria died in 1745 and Mir Mannu became the Governor of Lahore.

==== Jassa Singh honored as Jassa Singh Ramgarhia ====
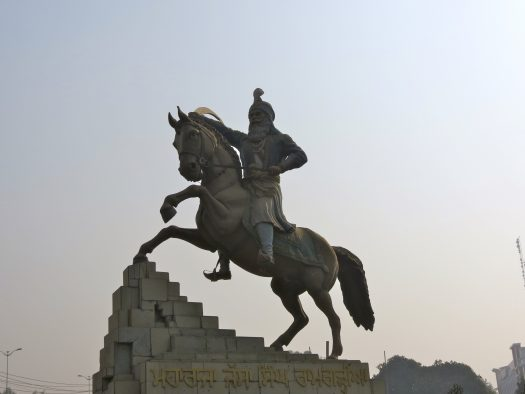
Jassa Singh Ramgharia

Mir Mannu (Mu'in ul-Mulk), the Governor of Lahore, was worried about the increasing power of the Sikhs so he broke the peace. Mir Mannu also ordered Adina Beg, the Faujdar (garrison commander) of the Jalandhar region, to begin killing the Sikhs. Adina Beg was a very smart politician and wanted the Sikhs to remain involved helping them. In order to develop good relations with the Sikhs, he sent secret messages to them who were living in different places. Jassa Singh Ramgarhia responded and agreed to cooperate with the Faujdar and was made a Commander. This position helped him develop good relations with Divan Kaura Mal at Lahore and assign important posts to the Sikhs in the Jalandhar division.

The Governor of Lahore ordered an attack on Ram Rauni to kill the Sikhs in the fort, with Adina Beg and Jassa Singh's forces joining the siege. After four months, the Sikhs inside ran out of supplies. Jassa Singh contacted them, joined their side, and, with the help of Divan Kaura Mal, lifted the siege. The fort was then strengthened and renamed Ramgarh, and Jassa Singh, now the fort's Jathedar, became known as Ramgarhia.

==== Fighting the tyrannical Government ====
Mir Mannu intensified his violence and oppression against the Sikhs. There were only 900 Sikhs when he surrounded the Ramgarh fort again. The Sikhs fought their way out bravely through thousands of army soldiers. The army demolished the fort. The hunt for and torture of the Sikhs continued until Mannu died in 1753. Mannu's death left Punjab without any effective Governor. It was again an opportune period for the Sikhs to organise themselves and gain strength. Jassa Singh Ramgarhia rebuilt the fort and took possession of some areas around Amritsar. The Sikhs took upon themselves the task of protecting the people in the villages from the invaders. The money they obtained from the people was called Rakhi (protection charges). The new Governor, Taimur, son of Ahmed Shah Abdali, despised the Sikhs. In 1757, he again forced the Sikhs to vacate the fort and move to their hiding places. The fort was demolished, Harmandir Sahib was blown up, and Amrit Sarovar was filled with debris. The Governor decided to replace Adina Beg. Beg asked the Sikhs for help and they both got a chance to weaken their common enemy. Adina Beg won the battle and became the Governor of Punjab. Sikhs rebuilt their fort Ramgarh and repaired the Harmandir Sahib. Beg was well acquainted with the strength of the Sikhs and he feared they would oust him if he allowed them to grow stronger, so he led a strong army to demolish the fort. After fighting valiantly, the Sikhs decided to leave the fort. Adina Beg died in 1758.

==== Ramgarhia Misl Estate ====
Jassa Singh Ramgarhia occupied the area to the north of Amritsar between the Ravi and the Beas rivers. He also added the Jalandhar region and Kangra hill areas to his estate. He had his capital in Sri Hargobindpur, a town founded by the sixth Guru. The large size of Ramgarhia's territory aroused the jealousy of the other Sikh Misls.

==== Conflicts between Misls ====
A conflict between Jai Singh Kanhaiya and Jassa Singh Ramgarhia developed and the Bhangi Misl sardars also developed differences with Jai Singh Kanhaiya. A big battle was fought between Jai Singh, Charat Singh, and Jassa Singh Ahluwalia on one side and Bhangis, Ramgarhias and their associates on the other side. The Bhangi side lost the battle.

Later, Jassa Singh Ahluwalia, one day while hunting, happened to enter Ramgarhia territory where Jassa Singh Ramgarhia's brother arrested him. Ramgarhia apologised for the misbehaviour of his brother, and returned Ahluwalia with gifts.

==== Intra-Misl wars ====
Due to mutual jealousies, fights continued among the Sikh Sardars. In 1776, the Bhangis changed sides and joined Jai Singh Kanhaiya to defeat Jassa Singh Ramgarhia. His capital at Sri Hargobindpur was taken over and he was followed from village to village, and finally forced to vacate all his territory. He had to cross the river Sutlej and go to Amar Singh, the ruler of Patiala. Maharaja Amar Singh welcomed Ramgarhia and who then occupied the areas of Hansi and Hissar which eventually Ramgarhia handed over to his son, Jodh Singh Ramgarhia.

Maharaja Amar Singh and Ramgarhia took control of the villages on the west and north of Delhi, now forming parts of Haryana and Western Uttar Pradesh. The Sikhs disciplined and brought to justice all the Hindu Nawabs who were harassing their Muslim population. Jassa Singh Ramgarhia entered Delhi in 1783. Shah Alam II, the Mughal emperor, extended the Sikhs a warm welcome. Ramgarhia left Delhi after receiving gifts from him. Because of the differences arising out of the issue of dividing the Jammu state revenues, longtime friends and neighbors Maha Singh, Jathedar of Sukerchakia Misl and Jai Singh, Jathedar of the Kanheya Misl, became enemies. This resulted in a war which changed the course of Sikh history. Maha Singh requested Ramgarhia to help him. In the battle, Jai Singh lost his son, Gurbaksh Singh, while fighting with Ramgarhias.

=== Sikhs captured Delhi ===
Sikh Misl Cavalryman

After continuous raids, Sikhs under Jassa Singh Ahluwalia, Baba Baghel Singh, Jassa Singh Ramgarhia defeated the Mughals on 11 March 1783, captured Delhi and hoisted the Sikh flag (Nishan Sahib) in Red Fort and Ahluwalia became king but they gave it back to the Mughals after signing peace treaties.

==== The creation of the United Misl ====
Jai Singh Kanheya’s widowed daughter-in-law, Sada Kaur, though very young, was a great statesperson. Sada Kaur saw the end of the Khalsa power through such mutual battles but she was able to convince Maha Singh to adopt the path of friendship. For this she offered the hand of her daughter, then only a child, to his son, Ranjit Singh (later the Maharaja of the Punjab), who was then just a boy. The balance of power shifted in favour of this united Misl. This made Ranjit Singh the leader of the most powerful union of the Misls.

When the Afghan invader, Zaman Shah Durrani, came in 1788 the Sikhs, however, were still divided. Ramgarhia and Bhangi Misls were not willing to help Ranjit Singh to fight the invader, so the Afghans took over Lahore and looted it. Ranjit Singh occupied Lahore in 1799 but still the Ramgarhias and Bhangis did not accept him as the leader of all the Sikhs. They got the support of their friends and marched to Lahore to challenge Ranjit Singh. When the Bhangi leader died Jassa Singh Ramgarhia returned to his territory. Ramgarhia was eighty years old when he died in 1803. His son, Jodh Singh Ramgarhia, developed good relations with Ranjit Singh and they never fought again.

== Sikh Empire (1799–1849 CE) ==
Ranjit Singh was crowned on 12 April 1801 (to coincide with Baisakhi). Sahib Singh Bedi, a descendant of Guru Nanak Dev, conducted the coronation. Gujranwala served as his capital from 1799. In 1802 he shifted his capital to Lahore and Amritsar. Ranjit Singh rose to power in a very short period, from a leader of a single Sikh misl to finally becoming the Maharaja (Emperor) of Punjab.

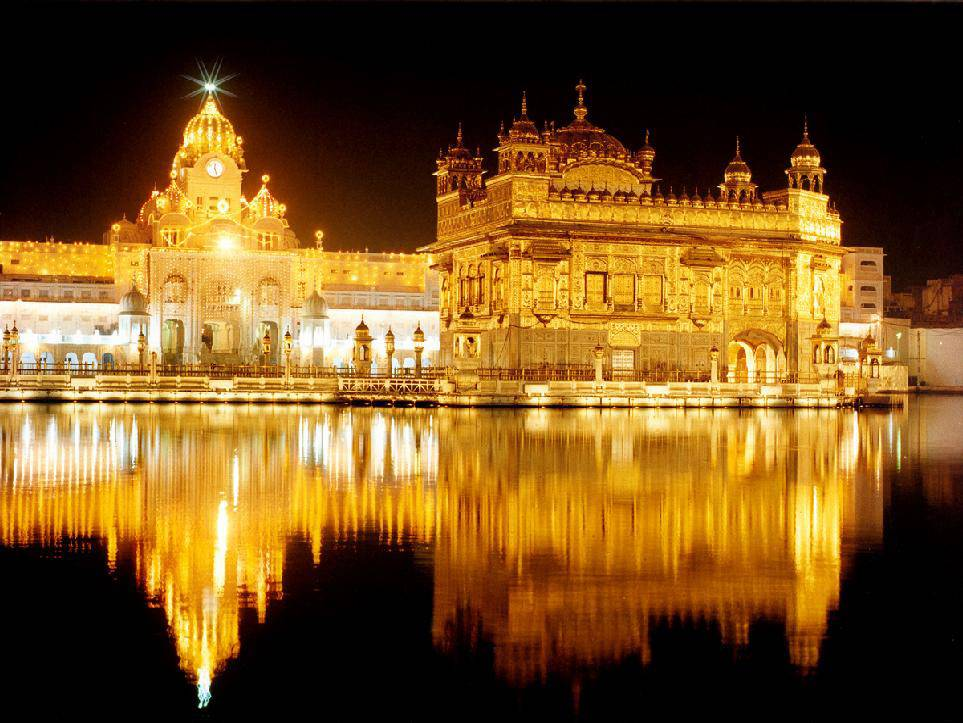
Harmandir Sahib (The Golden Temple) is culturally the most significant place of worship for the Sikhs. Maharaja Ranjit Singh rebuilt Harmandir Sahib in marble and copper in 1809, overlaid the sanctum with gold foil in 1830.

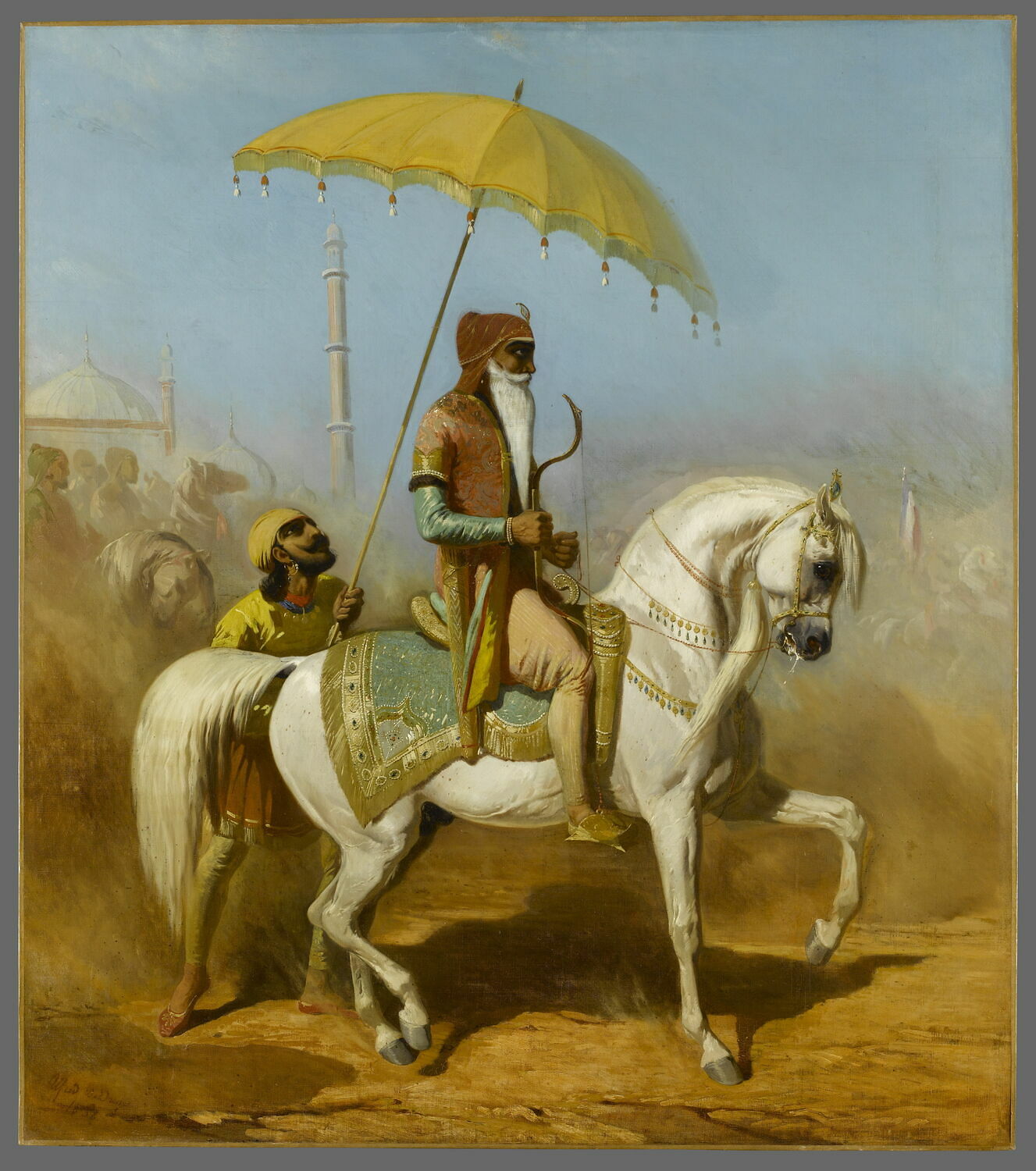
Maharaja Ranjit Singh ruler of the Sikh Empire.

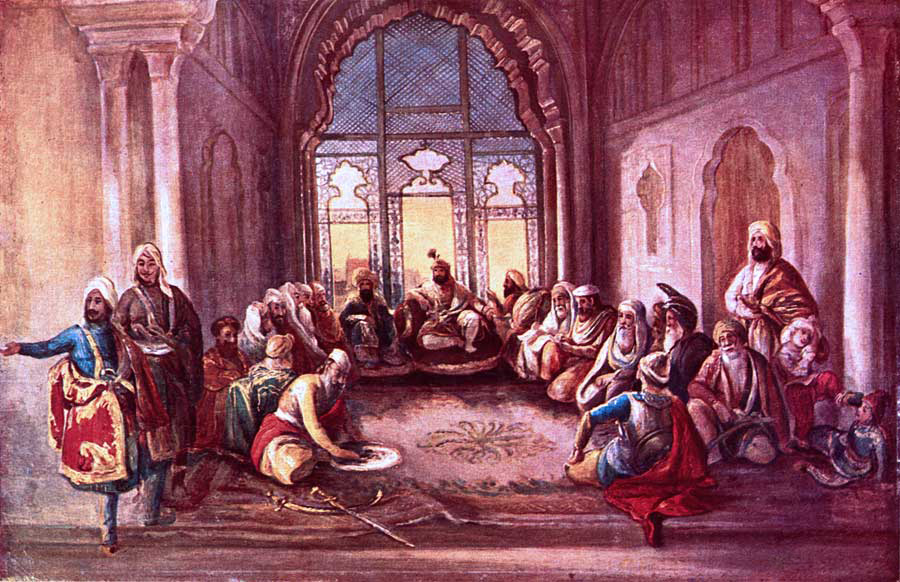
Maharaja Sher Singh and his council in the Lahore Fort in 1841.

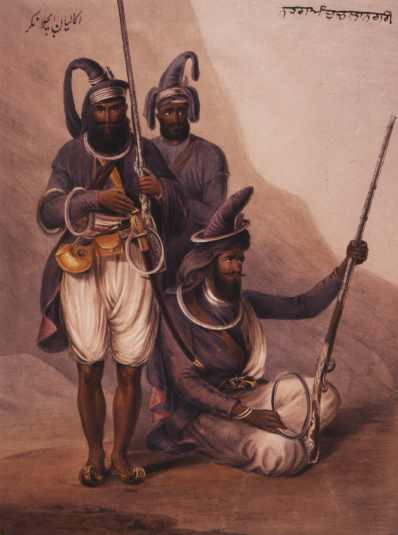
Nihang Abchal Nagar (Nihangs from Hazur Sahib), 1844. Shows turban-wearing Sikh soldiers with chakrams.

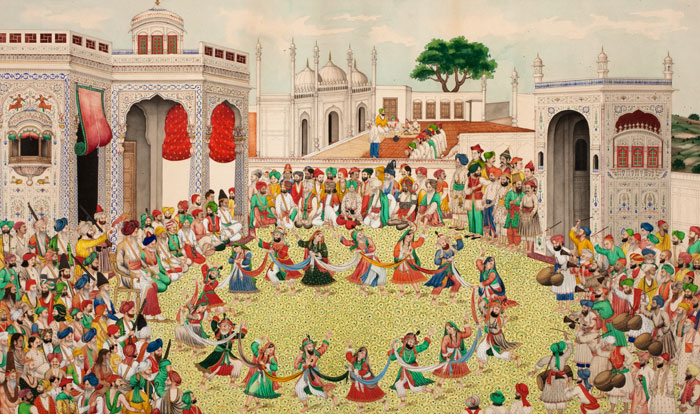
Sher Singh in Lahore, c. 1845 CE.

=== Formation ===
The Sikh Empire (from 1801 to 1849) was formed on the foundations of the Punjabi Army by Maharaja Ranjit Singh. The Empire extended from Khyber Pass in the west, to Kashmir in the north, to Sindh in the south, and Tibet in the east. The main geographical footprint of the empire was the Punjab. The religious demography of the Sikh Empire was Muslim (80%), Sikh (10%), Hindu (10%).

The Sikh Empire's foundations can be traced back to 1707, following Aurangzeb's death and the decline of the Mughal Empire. As the Mughal power waned, the Dal Khalsa, the Sikh army, fought against Mughal remnants, Rajput leaders, Afghans, and Punjabi Muslims. This period saw the army grow and split into semi-independent misls, each controlling different regions. Between 1762 and 1799, Sikh rulers began consolidating power within their misls. The formal establishment of the Sikh Empire occurred in 1801 with Maharaja Ranjit Singh's coronation, unifying the misls under one political entity. The misldars, affiliated with the army, were nobility with prestigious histories in Punjab.

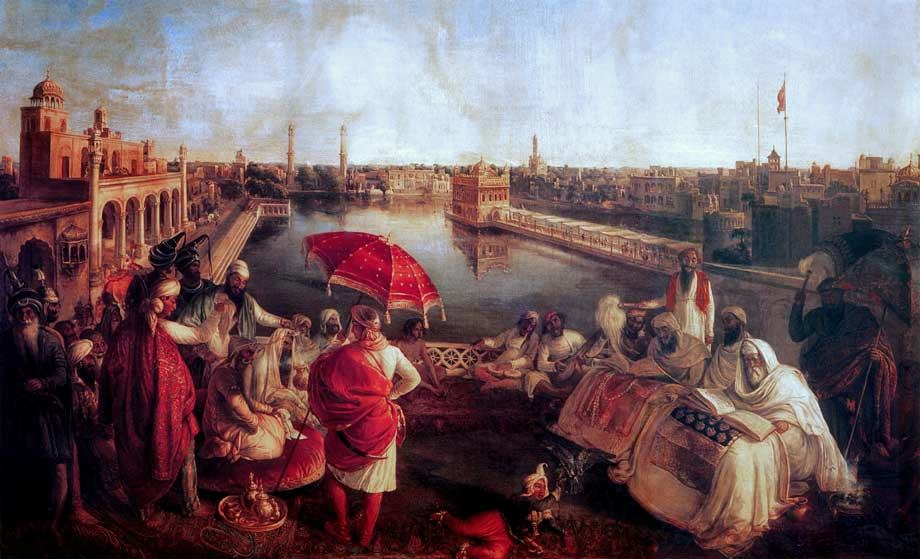
Maharaja Ranjit Singh listening to Guru Granth Sahib being recited near the Akal Takht and Golden Temple, Amritsar, Punjab, India.

=== Punjab flourishes in education and arts ===
The Sikh rulers were very tolerant of other religions; and arts, painting and writings flourished in Punjab. In Lahore alone there were 18 formal schools for girls besides specialist schools for technical training, languages, mathematics and logic, let alone specialised schools for the three major religions, they being Hinduism, Islam, and Sikhism. There were craft schools specialising in miniature painting, sketching, drafting, architecture, and calligraphy. There wasn't a mosque, a temple, a dharmsala that had not a school attached to it. All the sciences in Arabic and Sanskrit schools and colleges, as well as Oriental literature, Oriental law, Logic, Philosophy, and Medicine were taught to the highest standard. In Lahore, Schools opened from 7am and closed at midday. In no case was a class allowed to exceed 50 pupils.

=== Khalsa Army ===
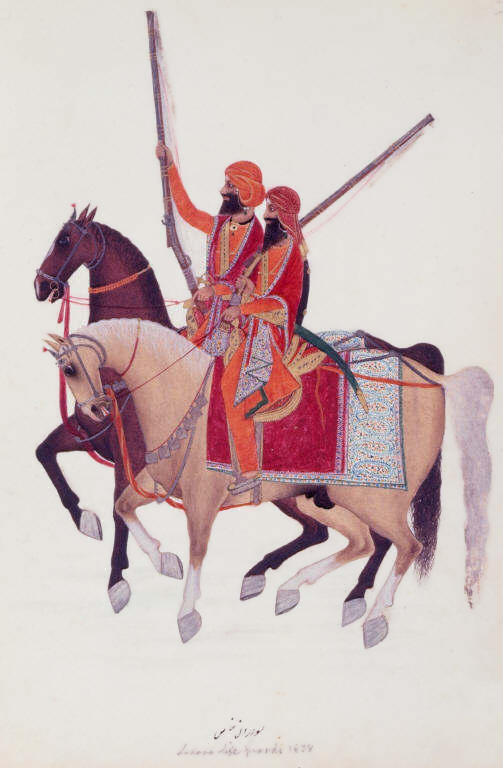
Ghorchara (Horse-mounted) Bodyguards of Maharaja Ranjit Singh of Punjab.

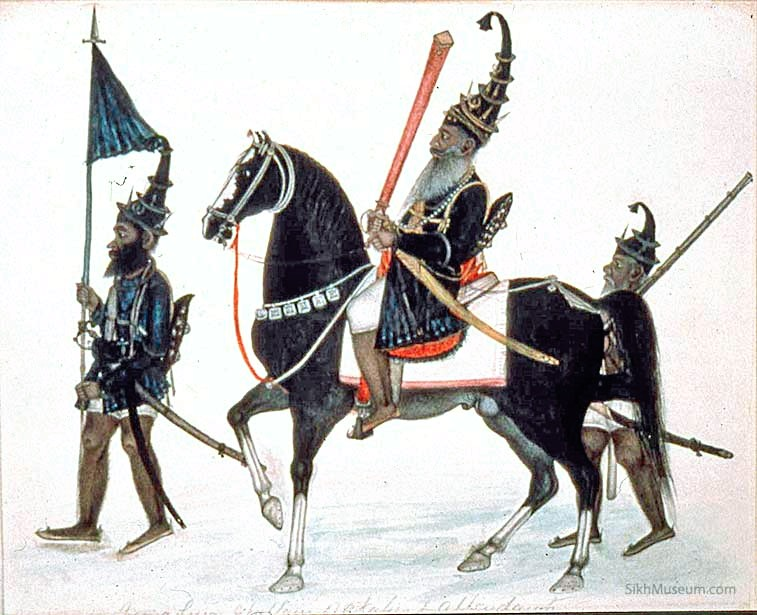
Sikh Khalsa Akali Nihangs.

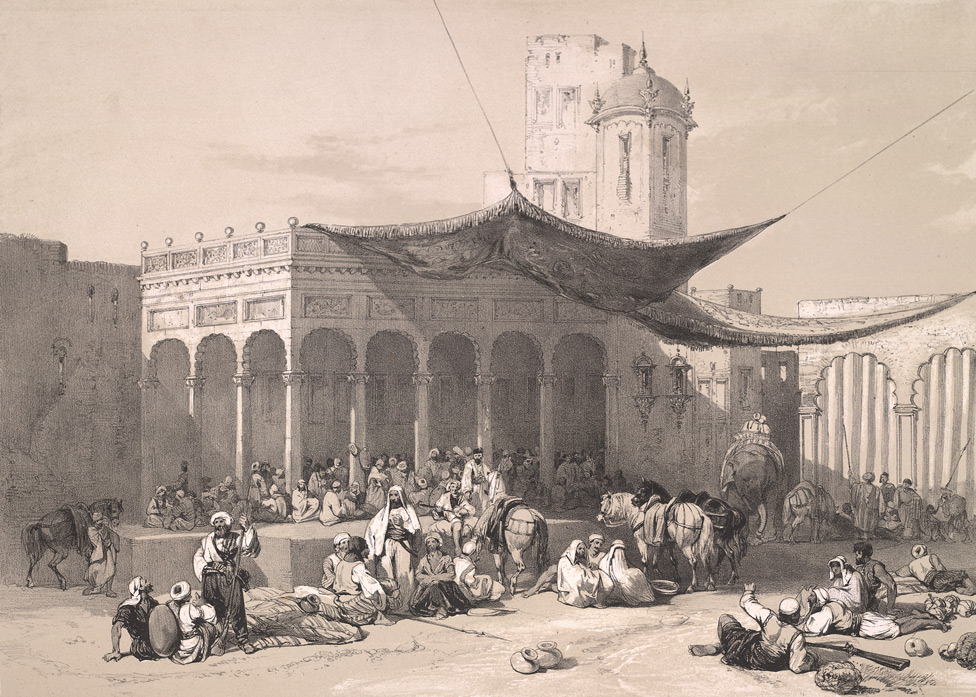
Sikh soldiers receiving their pay at the Darbar of Ranjit Singh

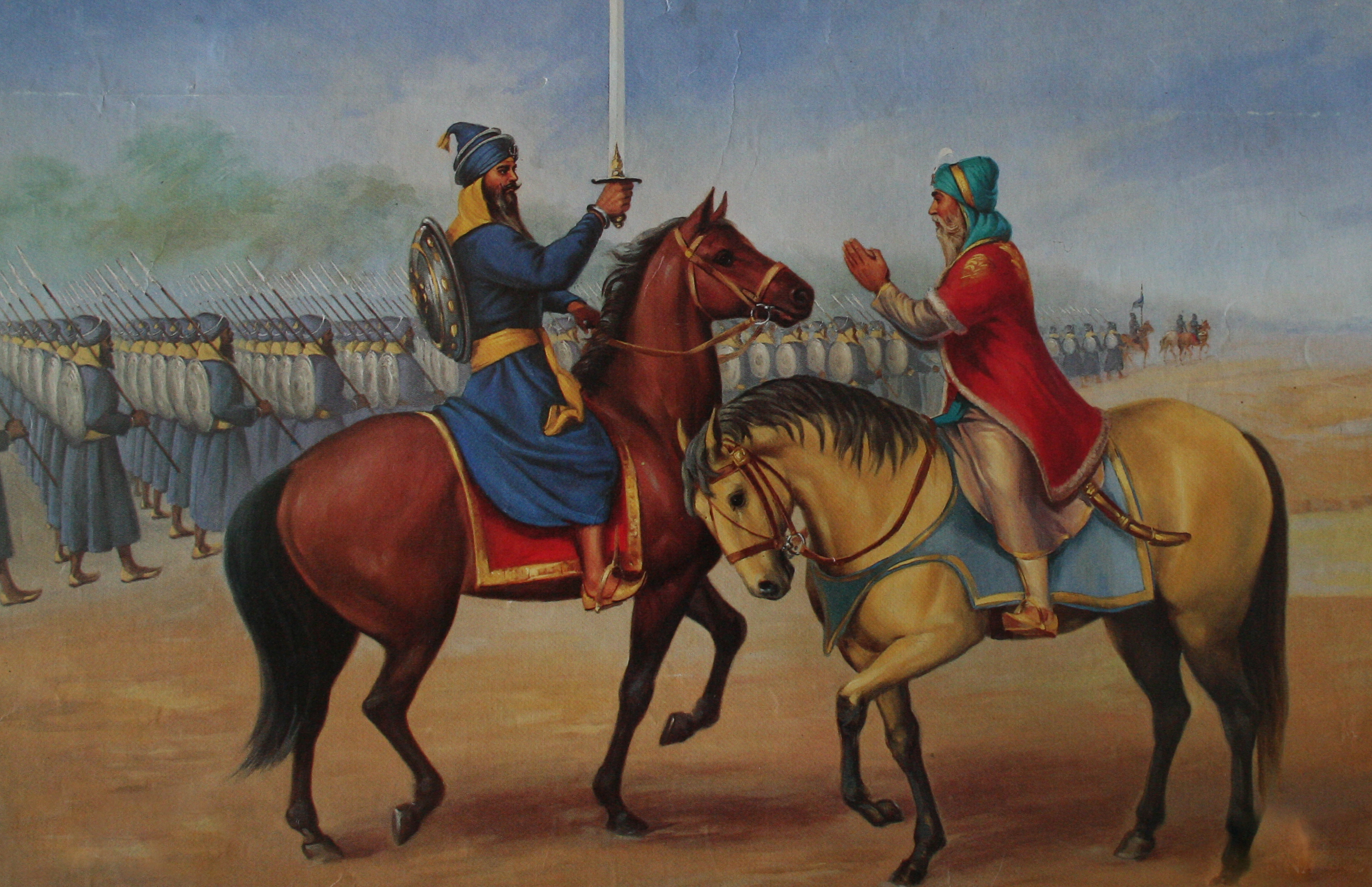
Akali Phula Singh and Maharaja Ranjit Singh

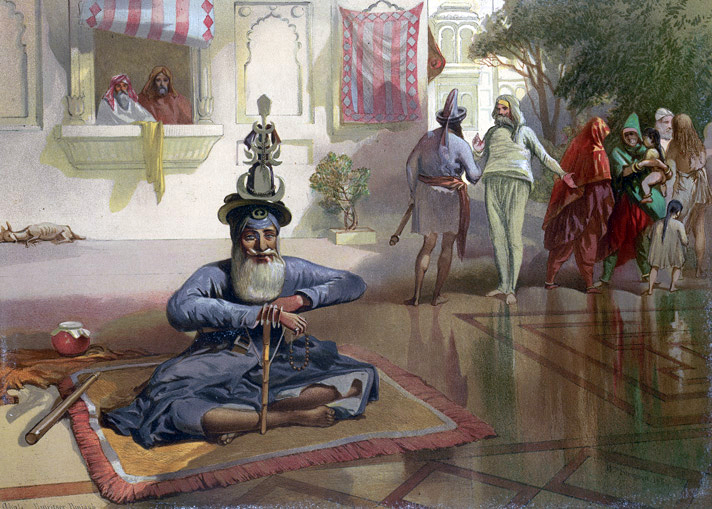
Akalis at a holy Tank

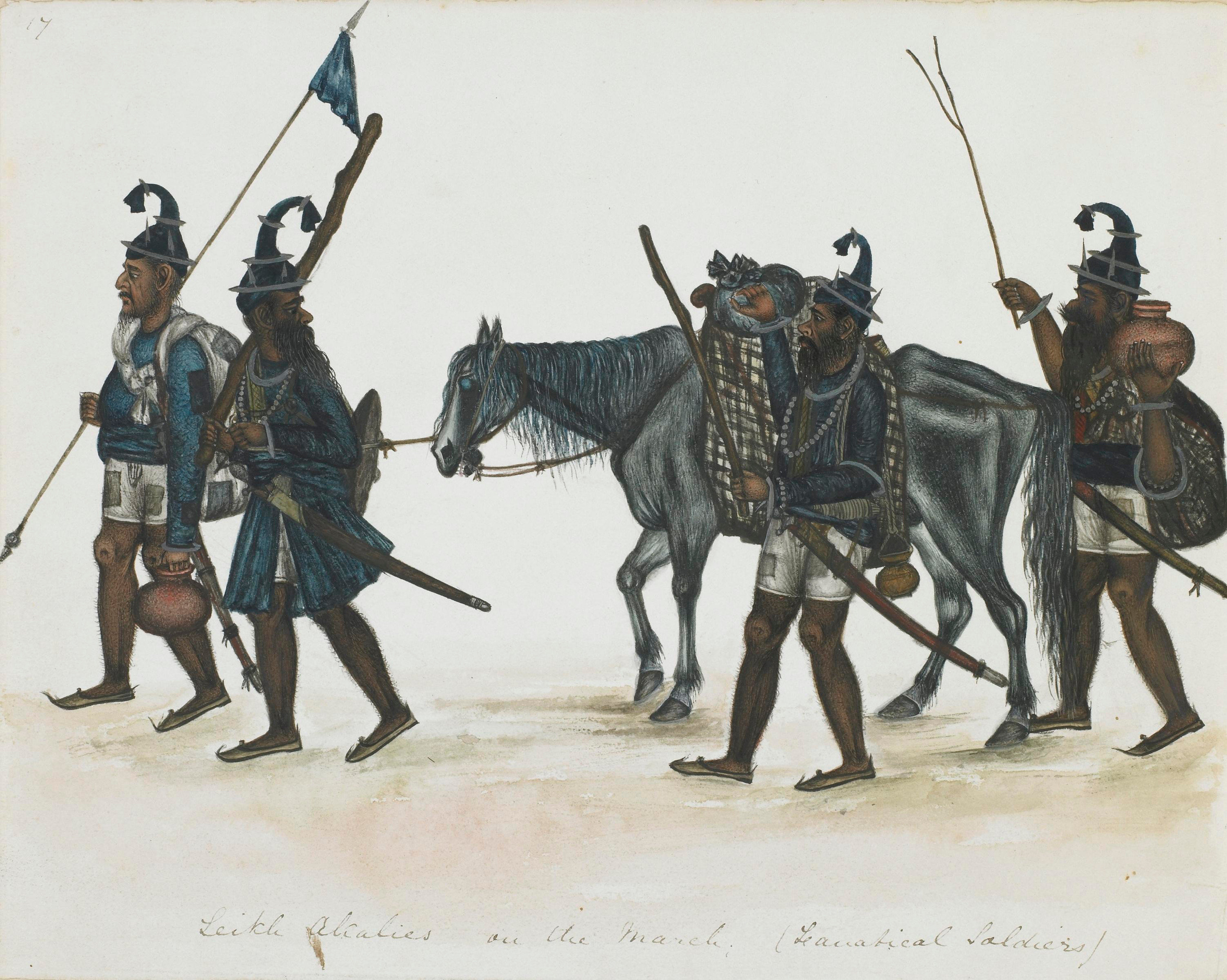
Akali warriors moving towards the capital, Lahore

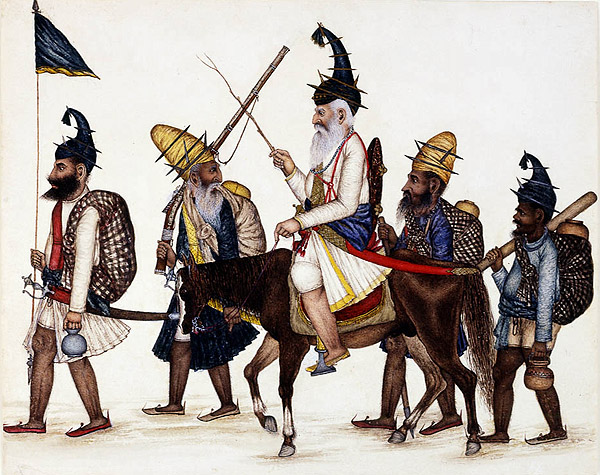
Akali Prahlad Singh

The Sikh Fauj-i-Ain (regular army) consisted of roughly 71,000 men and consisted of infantry, cavalry, and artillery units. Ranjit Singh employed generals and soldiers from many countries including Russia, Italy, France, and America.

There was strong collaboration in defense against foreign incursions such as those initiated by Shah Zaman and Timur Shah Durrani. The city of Amritsar was attacked numerous times. Yet the time is remembered by Sikh historians as the "Heroic Century". This is mainly to describe the rise of Sikhs to political power against large odds. The circumstances were hostile religious environment against Sikhs, a tiny Sikh population compared to other religious and political powers, which were much larger in the region than the Sikhs.

==== Conquests and Generals ====
In 1834 the Khalsa under Hari Singh Nalwa and Jean-Baptiste Ventura conquered Peshawar and extended the Sikh Raj up to Jamrud, Afghanistan. And Jawahar Singh and Zorawar Singh extended it to West Tibet.

Later the Sikhs under Hari Singh Nalwa Campaigned against the Afghans in the third phase of the Afghan Sikh wars and they took the Winter capital of the Afghans, Peshawar. Hari Singh Nalwa is considered one of the best commanders in history and is compared to Napoleon and Genghis Khan and for conquering and controlling the Khyber Pass, the United States of America wanted to build a statue in his praise. Mothers used to say his name to scare children to sleep in Afghanistan saying 'Sleep fast Nalwa is coming'. They also brought the queen's jewel, the Koh-i-noor diamond from Afghanistan and the gates to the Somnath temple.

The flag of the elite soldiers of Maharaja Ranjit Singh.

The Maharaja Employed many Prussian, French and Italian generals to train Sikhs in a more modern manner. He divided the army into three, the modern, elite soldiers the Fauj-i-Khas, the regular army including cavalry the Fauj-i-Ain and the irregular Gharcharas and Nihangs the Fauj i be Quawaid.

=== End of empire ===
==== Anglo-Sikh Wars ====
After Maharaja Ranjit Singh's death in 1839, the empire was severely weakened by internal divisions and political mismanagement. This opportunity was used by the East India Company to launch the First Anglo-Sikh War. The Battle of Ferozeshah in 1845 marked many turning points, the British encountered the Punjabi Army, opening with a gun-duel in which the Sikhs "had the better of the British artillery". But as the British made advancements, Europeans in the British army were especially targeted, as the Sikhs believed if the army "became demoralised, the backbone of the enemy's position would be broken". The fighting continued throughout the night earning the nickname "night of terrors". The British position "grew graver as the night wore on", and "suffered terrible casualties with every single member of the Governor General's staff either killed or wounded".

British General Sir James Hope Grant recorded: "Truly the night was one of gloom and forbidding and perhaps never in the annals of warfare has a British Army on such a large scale been nearer to a defeat which would have involved annihilation". The Punjabi ended up recovering their camp, and the British were exhausted. Lord Hardinge sent his son to Mudki with a sword from his Napoleonic campaigns. A note in Robert Needham Cust's diary revealed that the "British generals decided to lay down arms: News came from the Governor General that our attack of yesterday had failed, that affairs were disparate, all state papers were to be destroyed, and that if the morning attack failed all would be over, this was kept secret by Mr. Currie and we were considering measures to make an unconditional surrender to save the wounded...".

However, a series of events of the Sikhs being betrayed by some prominent leaders in the army led to its downfall. Maharaja Gulab Singh and Dhian Singh, were Hindu Dogras from Jammu, and top Generals of the army. Tej Singh and Lal Singh were secretly allied to the British. They supplied important war plans of the Army, and provided the British with updated vital intelligence on the Army dealings, which ended up changing the scope of the war and benefiting the British positions.

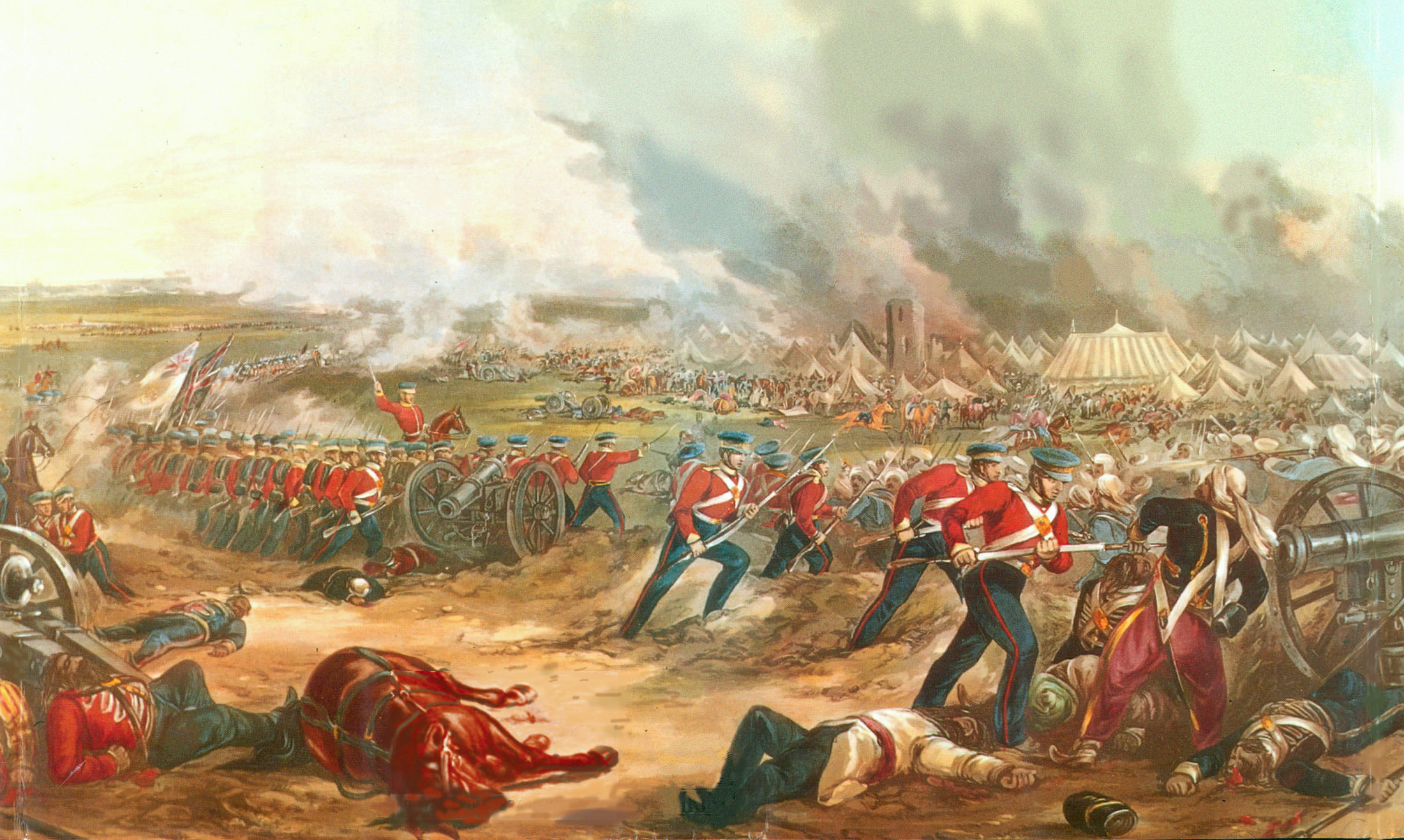
The First Anglo-Sikh War, 1845-46.

The Punjab Empire was finally dissolved after a series of wars with the British at the end of the Second Anglo-Sikh War in 1849 into separate princely states, and the British province of Punjab that were granted a statehood, and eventually a lieutenant governorship stationed in Lahore as a direct representative of the Royal Crown in London.

== Early Colonial Era (1849–1919 CE) ==
=== Punjab under the British Raj in India ===
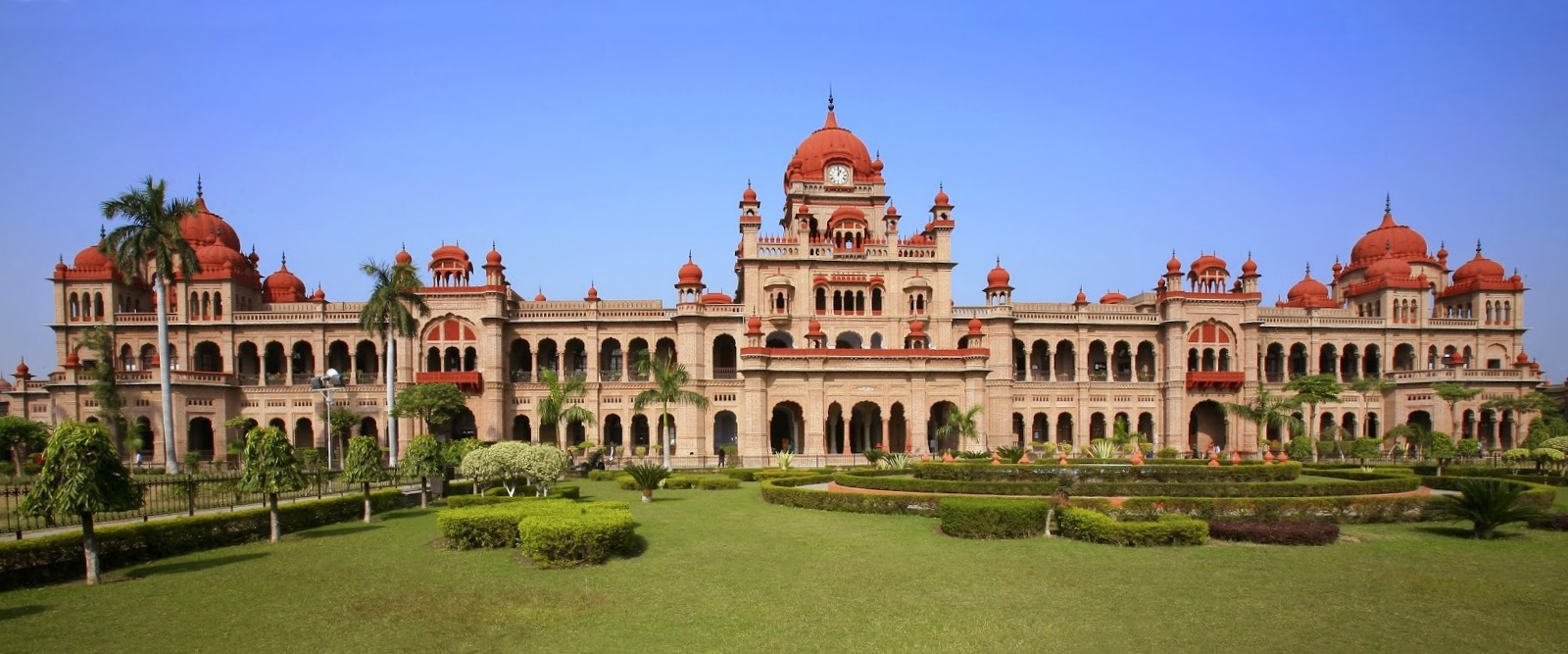
The Khalsa College, Amritsar.

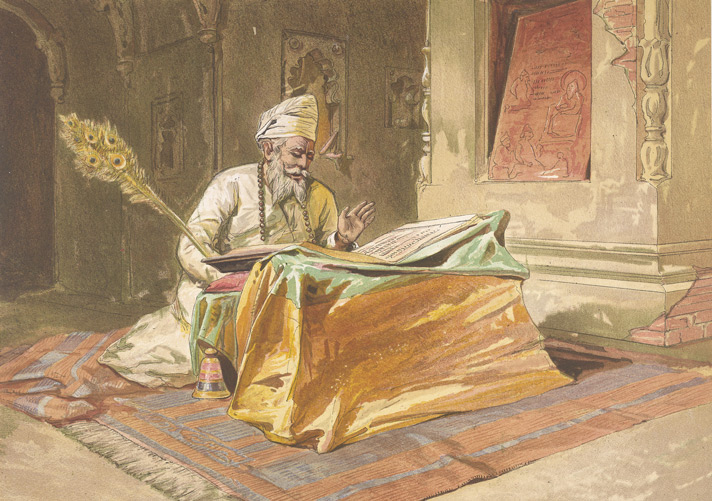
A Sikh Nirmala in Amritsar British India.

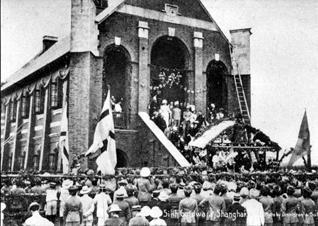
Sikh Gurudwara in China, Beijing

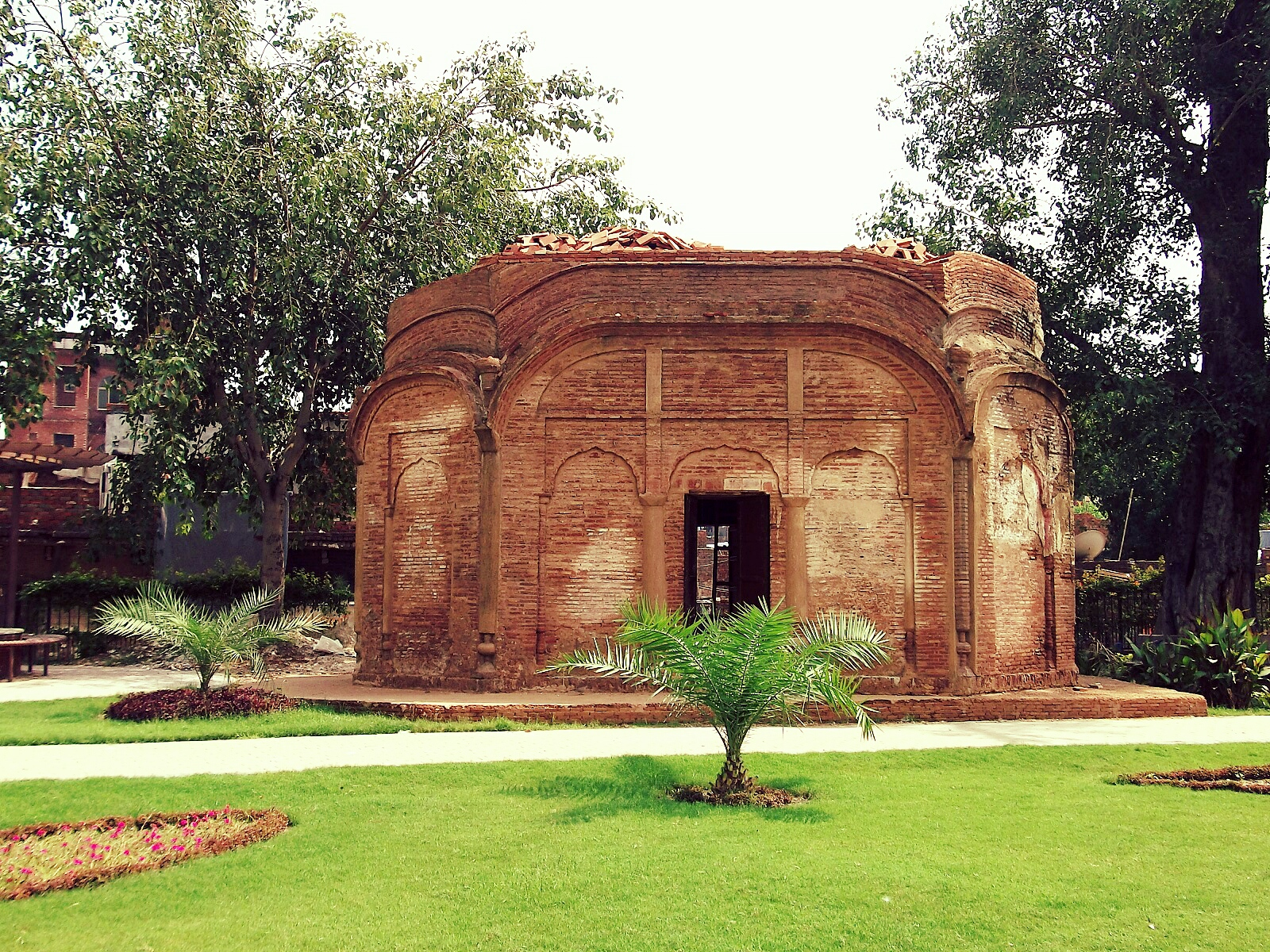
Samadhi of Maharaja Sher Singh.

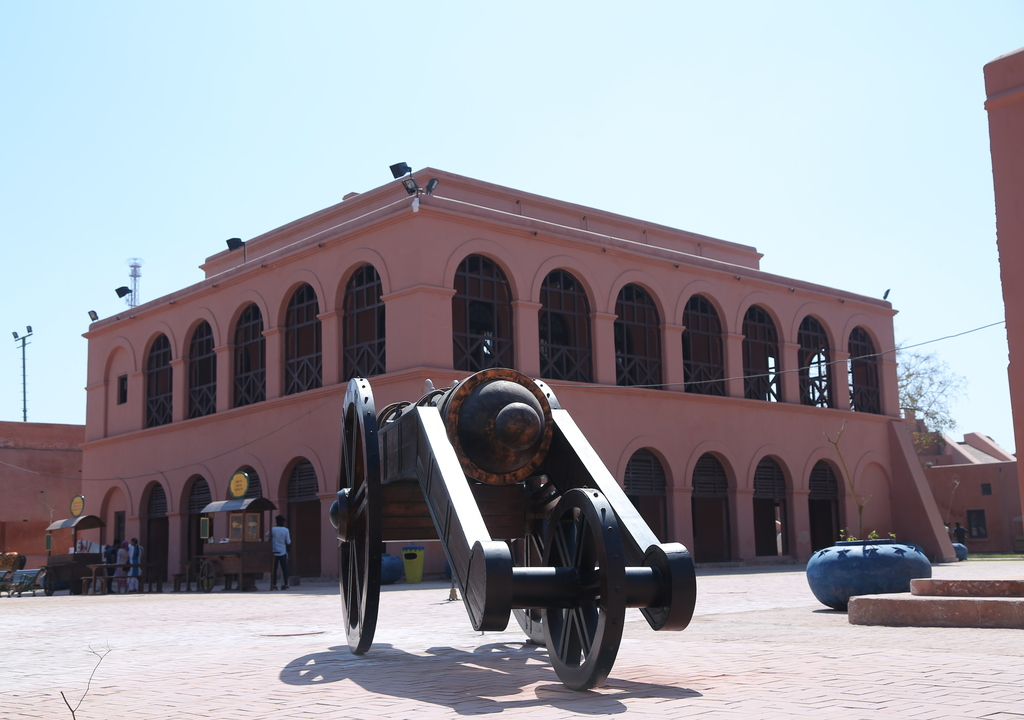
Gobindgarh Fort in Amritsar renovated in Amritsar

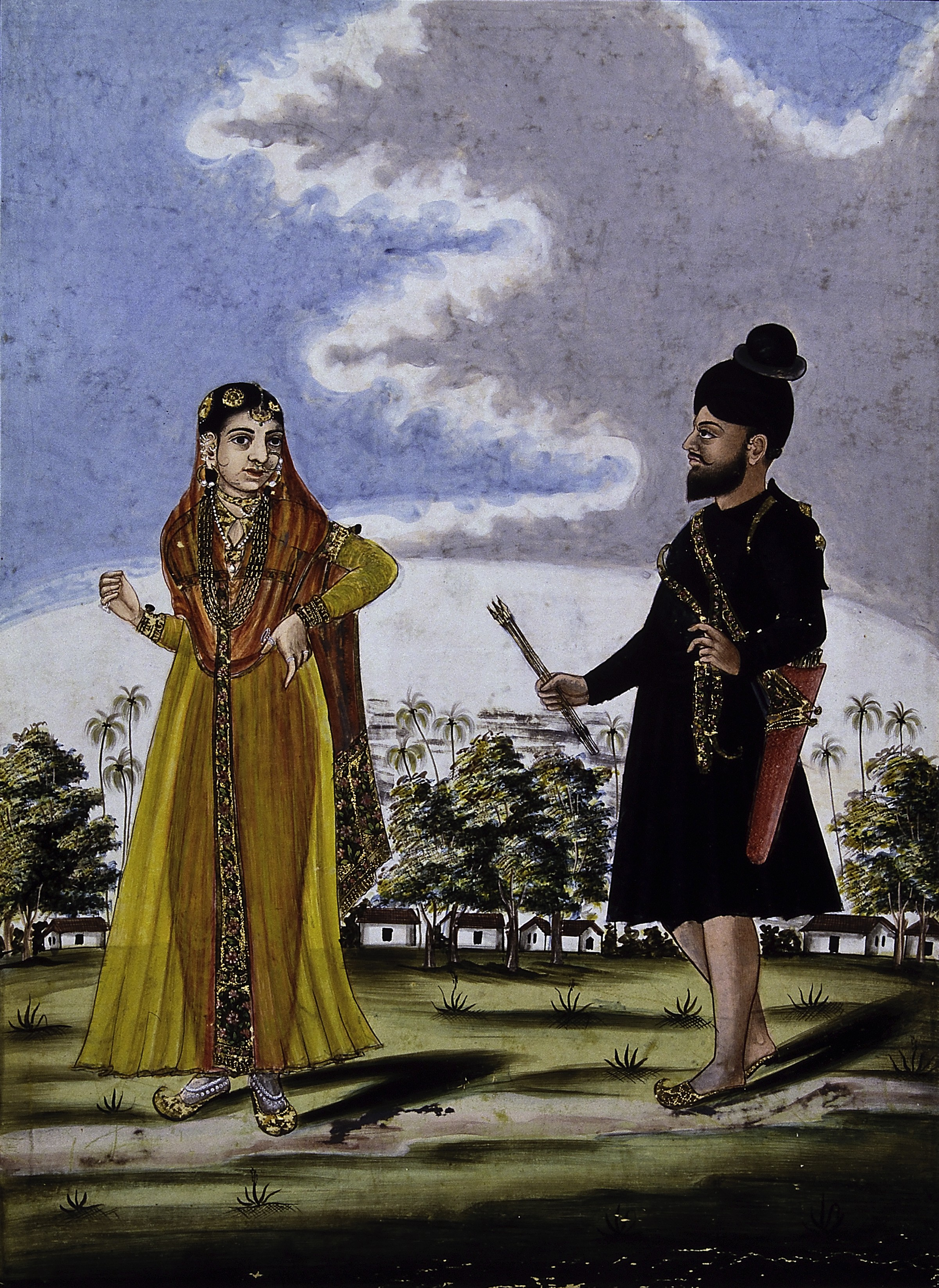
A Sikh Nihang and Nihang Singhani both traditional Sikh warriors.

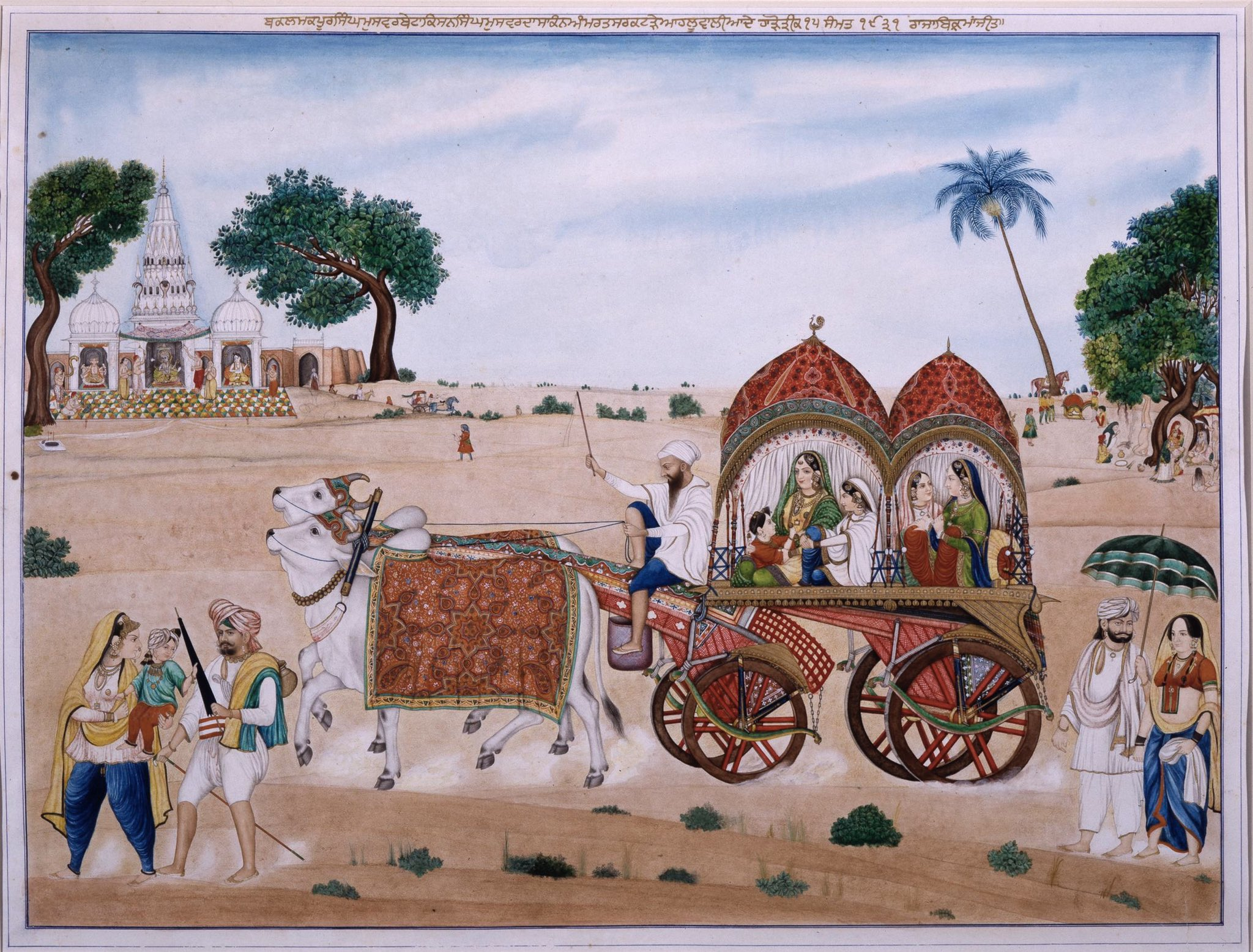
Bejewelled Sikh women in a bullock carriage, temple in the background, family on foot in front, c.1874

==== Impact on Punjabi education ====
Every village in the Punjab, through the Tehsildar (taxman), had an ample supply of the Punjabi qaida (beginners book), which was compulsory for females and thus, almost every Punjabi woman was literate in the sense that she could read and write the lundee form of Gurmukhi.

==== Sikhs in the British military ====
Under the East India Company and then British colonial rule from 1858 Sikhs were feared and respected for their martial ability. After they played a key role in the suppression of the Indian Rebellion of 1857-8. Sikhs were increasingly incorporated into the Indian army because they were not only seen as 'loyal', but because the colonial government believed that they were a 'martial race' whose religious traditions and popular customs made them skilled fighters.

The Sikhs again were honoured in the Battle of Saragarhi where twenty-one Sikhs of the 4th Battalion (then 36th Sikhs) of the Sikh Regiment of British India, died defending an army post from 10,000 Afghan and Orakzai tribesmen in 1897. In the end of Partition Sikhs were 20 percent of the British army despite they 1 percent population.

==== Settlement outside Punjab ====
In the late 1800s and early 1900s Punjabi and Sikhs began to immigrate to East Africa, the Far East, Canada, the United States, and the United Kingdom.

Position and job	Community, Religious Order or Sect	Places of settlement
Policeman	Jat	Singapore, Malaysia, China, Hong Kong, Canada and America
Taylor	Ramgharia	Kenya, Uganda, Assam and Burma
Armyman	Jat	Europe, America, Japan, Burma, North Africa and the Mediterranean
Labour	Mazhabi, Bhangi	England, Cochin, Tamil Nadu and the Bombay Presidency
Businessman	Arora, Khatri	America, Canada and England
Farmers	Various Castes and Tribes	California, Scotland, West Uttar Pradesh, Bihar and East Africa
Artisans and Poets	Khatris	United Kingdom, Scandinavia and Oman
Traditional Warriors	Nihangs	Hyderabad and Egypt

=== Sikhs in the World Wars ===
In two world wars 83,005 Sikh soldiers were killed and 109,045 were wounded. Sikh soldiers died or were wounded for the freedom of Britain and the world and during shell fire.

At offset of World War I, Sikh military personnel numbered around 35,000 men of the 161,000 troops, which is around 22% of the British Armed Forces, yet the Sikhs only made up less than 2% of the total population in India. Sikhs were known as 'Black Lions' by the German and Chinese forces for their ferocity

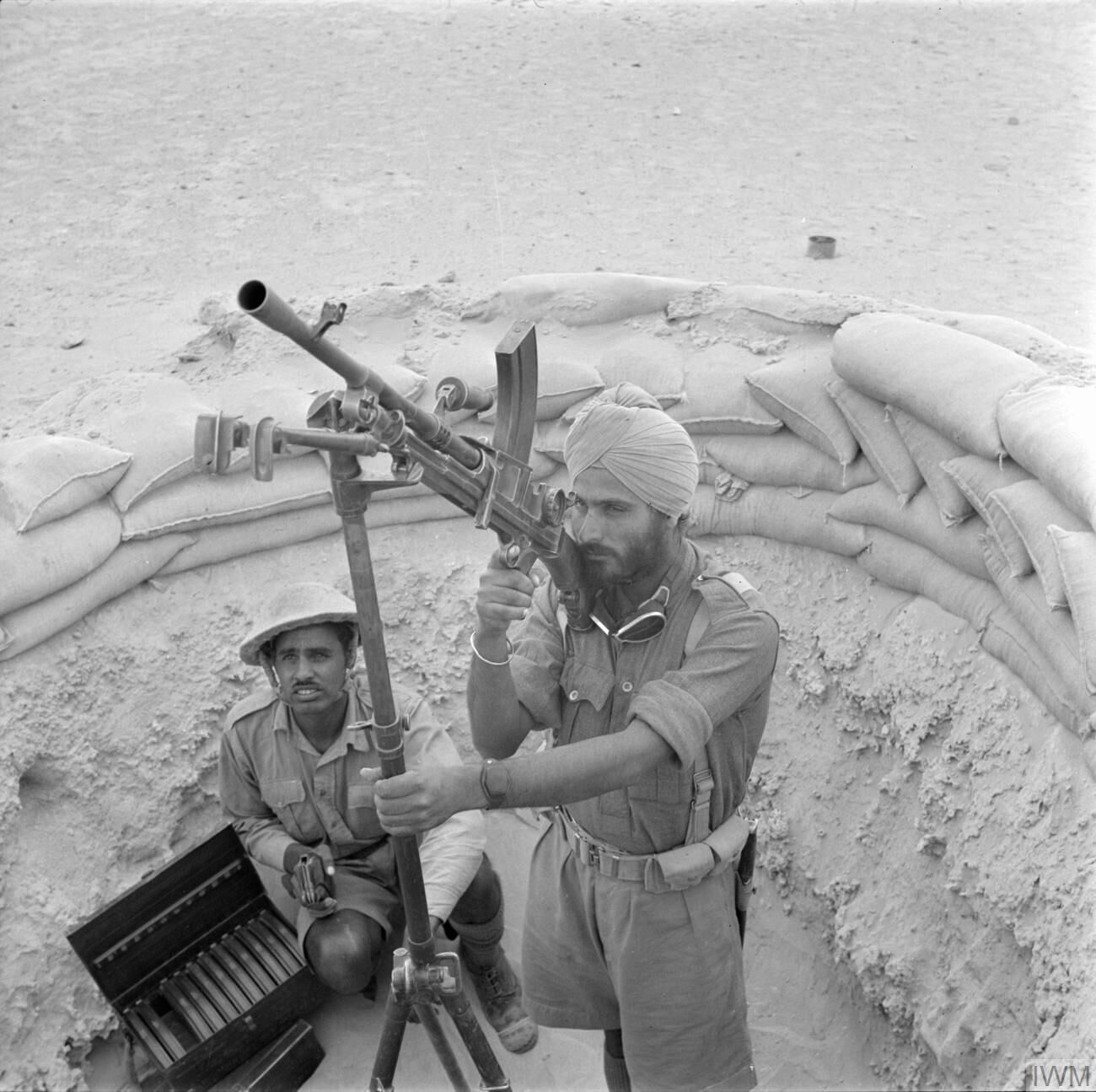
A Sikh in World War II.

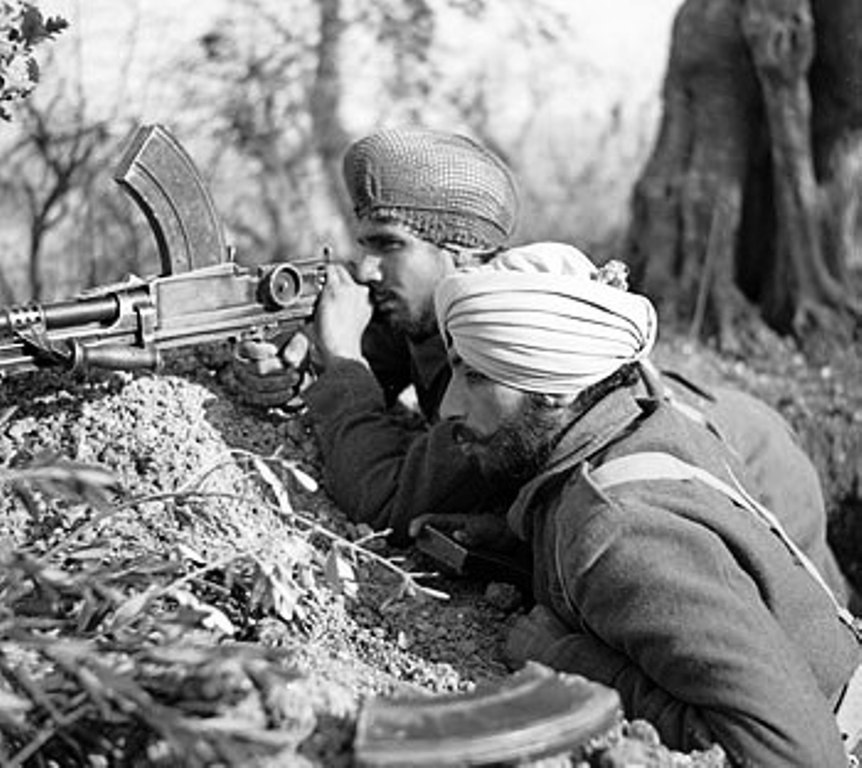
Indian Sikh soldiers in Italian campaign.

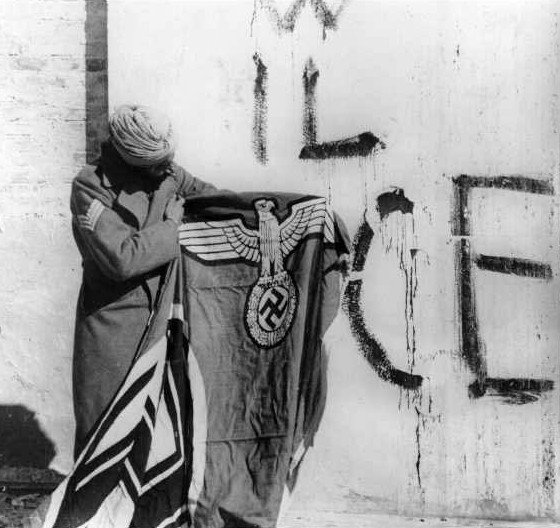
Sikh soldier with a captured swastika after the surrender of German forces in Italy, May 1945.

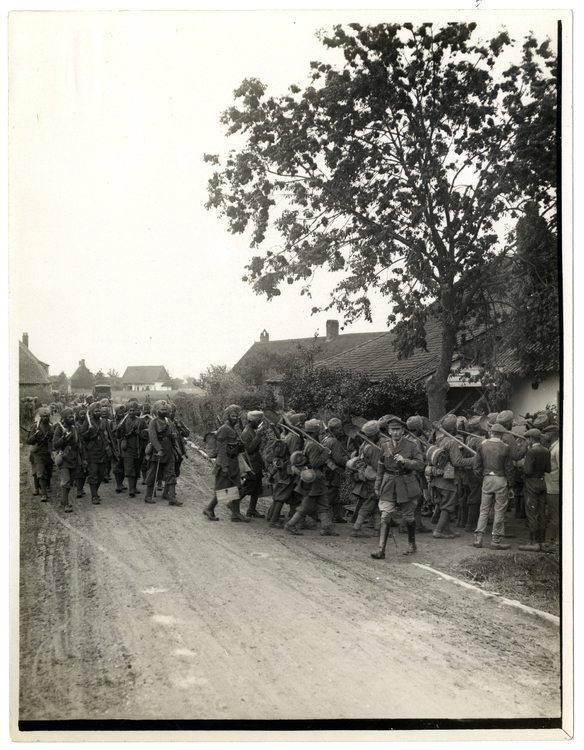
A company of 15th Sikhs at Le Sart, France, c. 1915

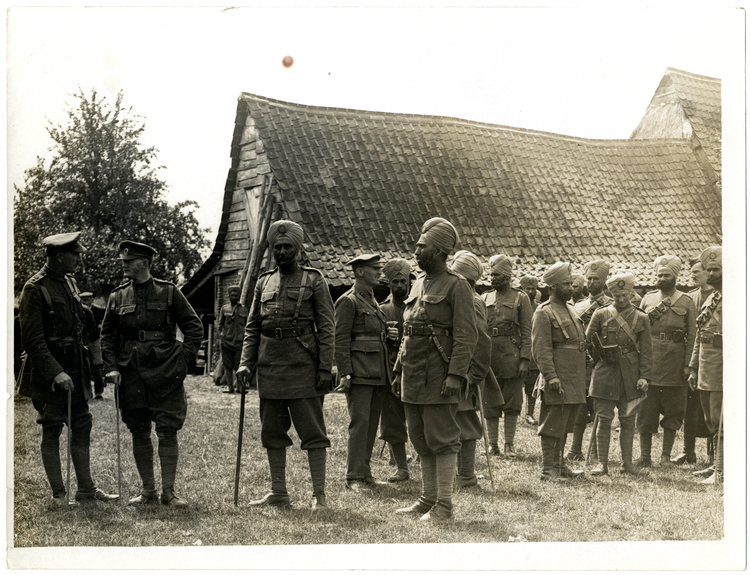
A company of 15th Sikhs at Le Sart, France 1915.

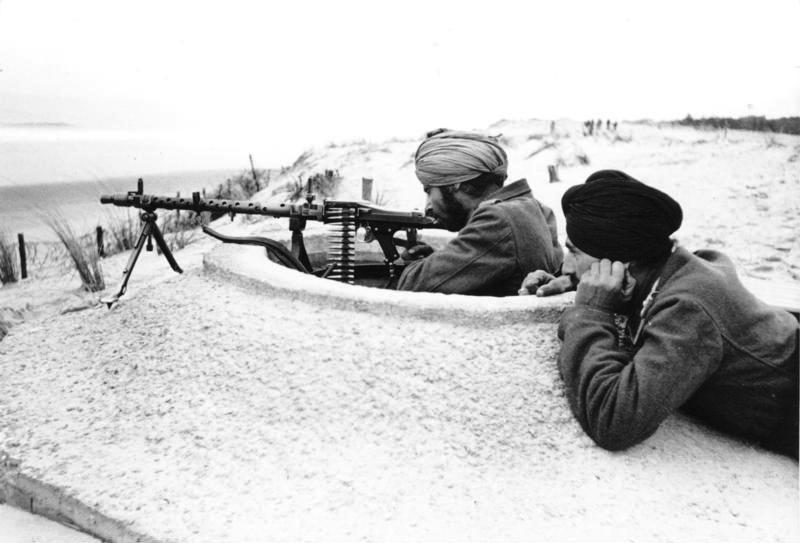
Sikh soldiers of the Indian Legion guarding the Atlantic Wall in France in March 1944. Subhas Chandra Bose initiated the legion's formation as a military force fighting alongside the Axis powers.

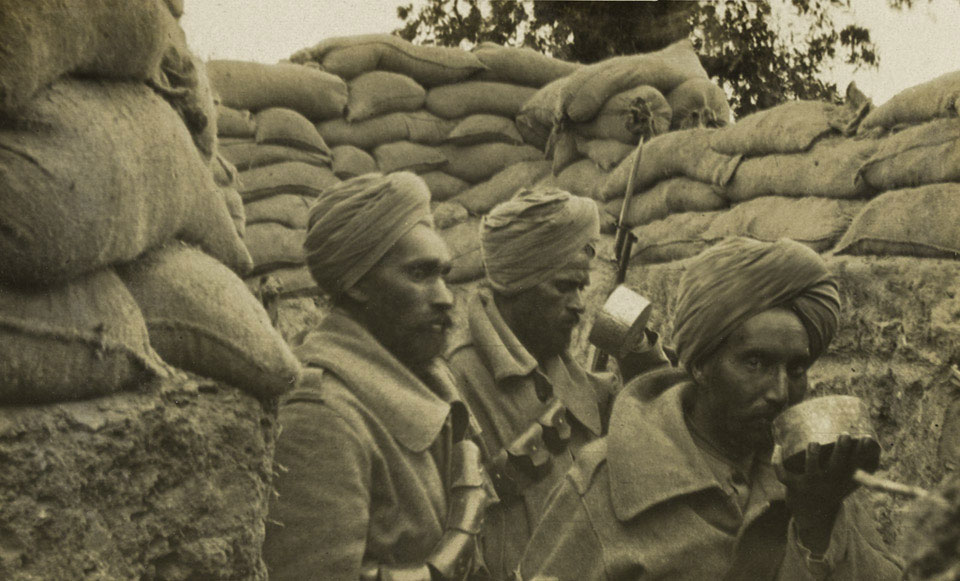
Sikh Soldiers during the battle of Gallipoli.

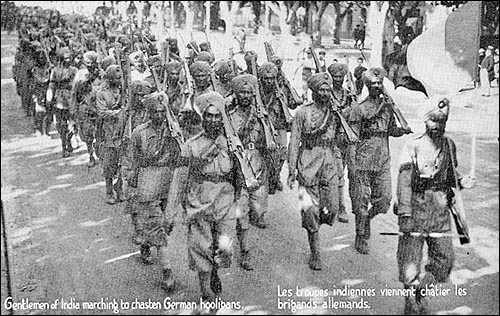
Sikhs in France fighting the Germans.

=== Early modern Sikh developments ===
In 1920 The Akali Party is established to free gurdwaras from corrupt masands (treasurers), and the Shiromani Gurdwara Parbandhak Committee (SPGC) is founded. In 1925 The Punjab Sikh Gurdwaras Act is passed, which transfers control of the Punjab's historic gurdwaras to the Shiromani Gurdwara Parbandhak Committee.

=== Singh Sabha Movement (1880-1919 CE) ===
The Singh Sabha Movement was a Sikh movement that began in Punjab in the 1870s in reaction to the proselytising activities of Christians, Hindu reform movements (Brahmo Samajis, Arya Samaj) and Muslims (Aligarh movement and Ahmadiyah). The movement was founded in an era when the Sikh Empire had been dissolved and annexed by the East India Company, the Khalsa had lost its prestige, and mainstream Sikhs were rapidly converting to other religions. The movement's aims were to "propagate the true Sikh religion and restore Sikhism to its pristine glory; to write and distribute historical and religious books of Sikhs; and to propagate Gurmukhi Punjabi through magazines and media." The movement sought to reform Sikhism and bring back into the Sikh fold the apostates who had converted to other religions; as well as to interest the influential British officials in furthering the Sikh community. At the time of its founding, the Singh Sabha policy was to avoid criticism of other religions and political matters unlike Hindu, Christian and Muslim protelisers.

The East India Company annexed the Sikh Empire in 1849 after the Second Anglo-Sikh War. Thereafter, Christian missionaries increased proselytising activities central Punjab. In 1853, Maharajah Dalip Singh, the last Sikh ruler, was controversially converted to Christianity. In parallel, Brahmo Samaji and Arya Samaji reform movements of Hinduism began active pursuit of Sikhs into their suddhi ceremonies. Muslim proselytizers formed the Anjuman-i-Islamia midst the Sikhs in Lahore, while the Ahmadiyah movement sought converts to their faith. The British colonial government, after annexing the Sikh empire in mid-19th-century, continue to patronize and gift land grants to these mahants, thereby increasing their strength and helped sustain the idolatry in Sikh shrines.

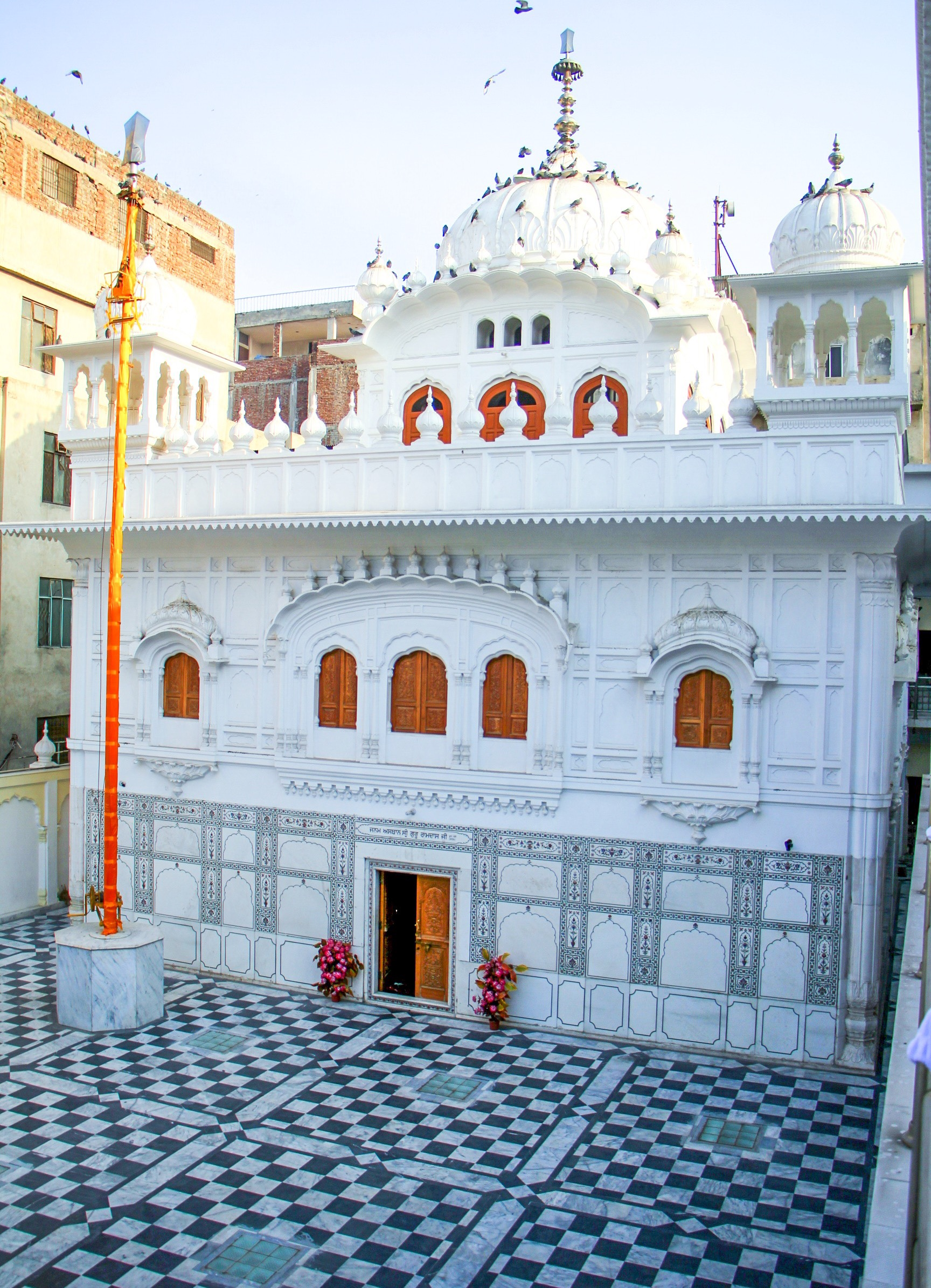
The First Lahore Singh Sabha Gurudwara, the birthplace of Guru Ram Das

The annexation of the Punjab to the East India Company in the mid-19th century saw severe deterioration of Gurdwara management.

In this way the Ranjit Singh's army was disbanded and the Punjab demilitarized, and Sikh armies were required to publicly surrender their arms and return to agriculture or other pursuits. Certain groups, however, like those who held revenue-free lands (jagirdars) were allowed to decline, particularly if they were seen as “rebels,” The British were wary of giving the Sikhs unmitigated control of their own gurdwaras, and drew from Sikh factions seen as loyal to the British, like the Sikh aristocracy and Sikhs with noted family lineages, who were given patronage and pensions, and Udasis, who had gained control of historical gurdwaras in the eighteenth and early nineteenth centuries, were allowed to retain proprietary control over lands and gurdwara buildings. The colonial administration went to considerable lengths to insert such loyalists into the Golden Temple in order to exert as much control over the Sikh body-politic as possible. One reason for this was the emergence of Sikh revivalist groups, like the Nirankaris, the Namdharis, and the Singh Sabha movement, shortly after annexation; this revivalism was spurred by a growing disaffection within the ranks of ordinary Sikhs about the perceived decline of proper Sikh practices.

Sikh institutions deteriorated further under the administration of the mahants, supported by the colonial government, who in addition to being considered as ignoring the needs of the Sikh community of the time, allowed the gurdwaras to turn into spaces for societal undesirables like petty thieves, drunks, pimps, and peddlers of unsavory and licentious music and literature, with which they themselves took part in such activities. In addition, they also allowed non-Sikh, Brahmanical practices to take root in the gurdwaras, including idol worship, caste discrimination, and allowing non-Sikh pandits and astrologers to frequent them, and began to simply ignore the needs of the general Sikh community, as they used gurdwara offerings and other donations as their personal revenue, and their positions became increasingly corrupt and hereditary. Some local congregations marshalled popular pressure against them and to relinquish control, but the large revenue derived from gurdwara estates empowered them to resist such pressure.

== Later Colonial Era (1919–1947 CE) ==
=== Sikh Struggles in British India ===
==== Jallianwala Bagh massacre ====
In 1919 the massacre of Jallianwala Bagh massacre in Amritsar during the festival of Vaisakhi when 4000 peaceful protesters including women, children and the elderly were shot at under the orders of Reginald Dyer. The site of the massacre was later established as 'memorial of national importance' in 1951.

==== Sikh revolutionaries ====
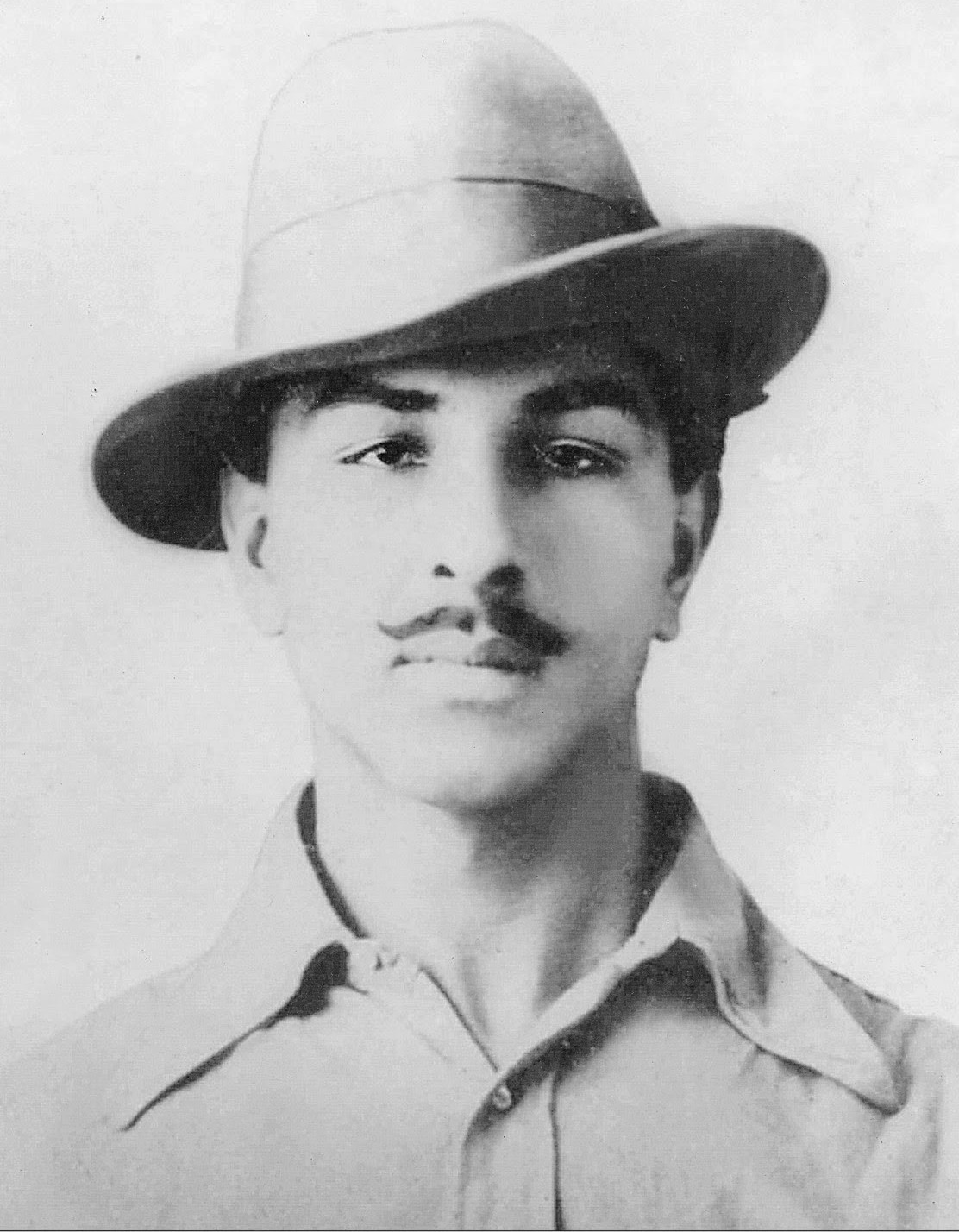
Born in a Sikh family, Bhagat Singh is considered among the most influential revolutionaries of the Indian independence movement.

Sohan Singh Bhakna, Kartar Singh Sarabha, alongside many other Punjabi's founded the Ghadar party to overthrow British colonial authority in India by means of an armed revolution. The Ghadar party is closely associated with the Babbar Akali Movement, a 1921 splinter group of "militant" Sikhs who broke away from the mainstream non-violent Akali movement.

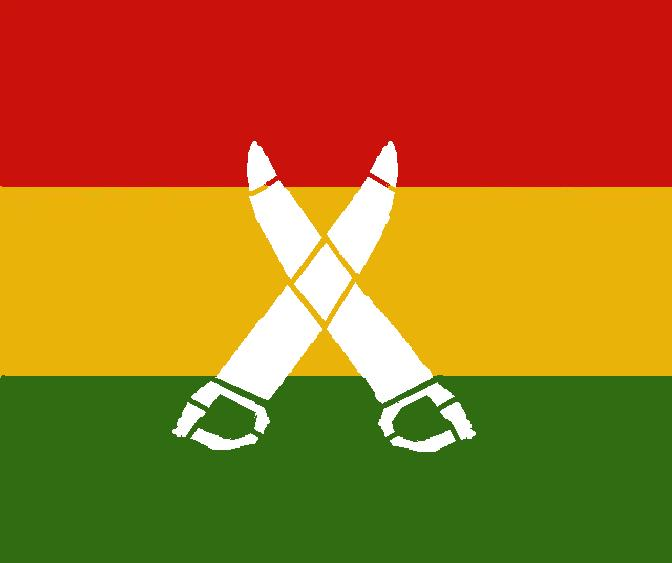
Ghadar Party flag, was an Indian revolutionary organisation primarily founded by Sikh Punjabis.

In 1914 Baba Gurdit Singh led the Komagata Maru ship to the port of Vancouver with 346 Sikhs on board; forced to leave port on 23 July. Bela Singh Jain an informer and agent of Inspector William Hopkinson, pulled out two guns and started shooting at the Khalsa Diwan Society Gurdwara Sahib on West 2nd Avenue. He murdered Bhai Bhag Singh, President of the Society and Battan Singh and Bela Singh was charged with murder, but Hopkinson decided to appear as a witness in his case and made up much of his testimony at his trail and subsequently Bela Singh was acquitted. On 21 October 1914, Bhai Mewa Singh, Granthi of Khalsa Diwan Society shot William Hopkinson in the Assize court corridor with two revolvers because he believed him to be unscrupulous and corrupt, using informers to spy on Indian immigrants. Canadian policeman William Hopkinson shot and killed by Mewa Singh who is later sentenced to death.

In 1926 Six Babar (literally, lion) revolutionary Akalis, are put to death by hanging.

In 1931 Bhagat Singh, Rajguru, and Sukhdev are convicted of murder of police inspector J.P. Saunders and executed; Bhagat Singh is popularly known as Shaheedey Azam (supreme martyr)

In 1940 Udham Singh, an Indian revolutionary socialist, assassinated Michael O'Dwyer to avenge justice for the Jallianwalla Bagh Massacre when 15,000 to 20,000 people including women, children were shot at after a peaceful protest in Amritsar

Bhagat Puran Singh Pingalwara dedicated his life to the 'selfless service of humanity'. He founded Pingalwara in 1947 with only a few patients, the neglected and rejected of the streets of Amritsar. An early advocate of what we today refer to as the 'Green Revolution', Bhagat Puran Singh was spreading awareness about environmental pollution, and increasing soil erosion long before such ideas became popular.

The Sikhs played a pioneering role in the Indian independence movement. They made sacrifices wholly out of proportion to their demographic strength (the Sikhs make up less than 2% of the Indian population).

(Figures below provided by Maulana Abul Azad, President of the Congress Party at the time of Independence.)

Out of 2125 Indians killed during the independence movement, 1550 (73%) were Sikhs.

Out of 2646 Indians deported for life to the Andaman Islands (where the colonial government exiled political and hardened criminals) 2147 (80%) were Sikhs.

Out of 127 Indians sent to the gallows, 92 (80%) were Sikhs.

At Jallianwala Bagh out of the 1302 men, women and children killed, 799 (61%) were Sikhs.

In the Indian Liberation Army, out of the 20,000 ranks and officers, 12,000 (60%) were Sikhs.

Out of 121 persons executed during the independence movement, 73 (60%) were Sikhs.

== Indian Independence (1947–1978 CE) ==
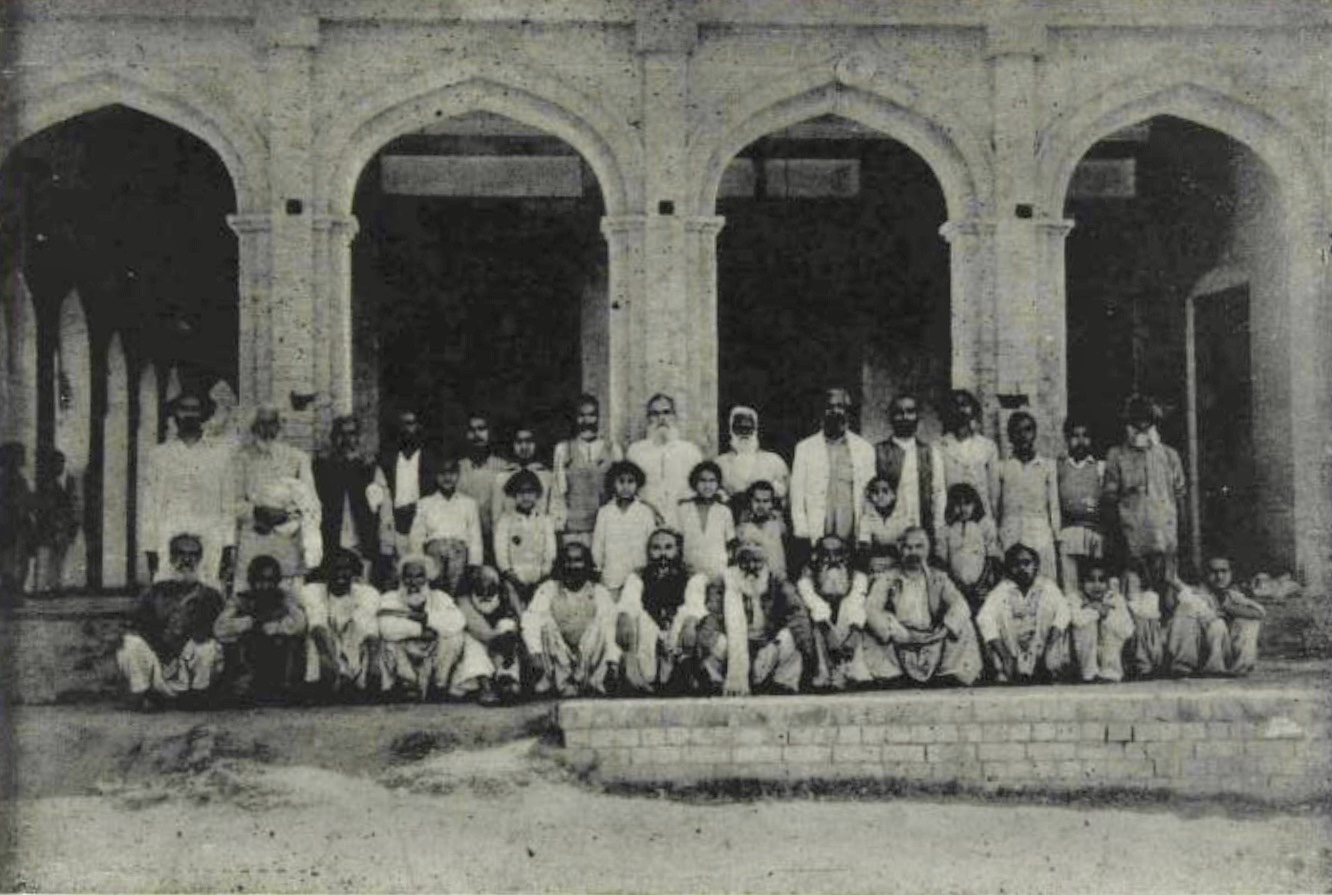
A group of Sikh male survivors of the Rawalpindi Massacres, who were forcibly converted to Islam and subsequently had their kesh (unshorn hair) cut to short length

=== Partition of India ===
Sikh organizations, including the Chief Khalsa Dewan and Shiromani Akali Dal led by Master Tara Singh, condemned the Lahore Resolution and the movement to create Pakistan, viewing it as inviting possible persecution; the Sikhs largely thus strongly opposed the partition of India.

=== Post Partition Years ===
The months leading up to the partition of India in 1947, saw heavy conflict in the Punjab between Sikh and Muslims, which saw the effective religious migration of Punjabi Sikhs and Hindus from West Punjab which mirrored a similar religious migration of Punjabi Muslims in East Punjab. The 1960s saw growing animosity and rioting between Punjabi Sikhs and Hindus in India, as the Punjabi Sikhs agitated for the creation of a Punjabi Sikh majority state, an undertaking which was promised to the Sikh leader Master Tara Singh by Nehru in return for Sikh political support during the negotiations for Indian Independence. Sikhs obtained the Sikh majority state of Punjab on 1 November 1966.

In 1945, the Sikh Rehat Maryada is published.

In 1962, the Punjabi University is inaugurated at Patiala, India.

=== Punjabi Suba Morcha ===
After the Partition of India Sikhs had been disrespected in many ways. Jawaharlal Nehru and Gandhi had stated that -

"The brave Sikhs of Panjab are entitled to special consideration. I see nothing wrong in an area and a set up in the North wherein the Sikhs can also experience the glow of freedom. (Jawaharlal Nehru, Congress meeting: Calcutta - July, 1944)

But after the partition of India he did not give Sikhs even a state to themselves and this led to further grievances. Many Hindus refused to keep Punjabi as their language and only Sikhs viewed their language as Punjabi.

=== Sikhs in The Indian Army ===
Sikhs composed 18 percent of the Indian army and are the most decorated regiment in India. Sikhs composed majority of the Sikh Regiment, Sikh Light Infantry, Jat Regiment and Rajput Regiment. They fought in all Indo-Pakistani wars and conflicts and the Sino-Indian War and got many titles and gallantry awards.

== Present day (1978–present CE) ==
=== Sikh-Nirankari Clash ===
On 13 April 1978, a Sant Nirankari convention led by Gurbachan Singh in Amritsar, approved by the Akali-led Punjab government, sparked violent clashes with orthodox Sikhs. The Sant Nirankaris, viewed as heretical by orthodox Sikhs for revering their leaders as gurus and altering Sikh scriptures, held a procession, leading Bhindranwale to oppose the event. A confrontation ensued between Sant Nirankaris and a group of Sikhs led by Bhindranwale and Fauja Singh, resulting in multiple deaths, including Fauja Singh's. The violence and subsequent cremation of the slain Sikhs brought Bhindranwale to national prominence.

=== Operation Blue Star and Sikh Genocide ===
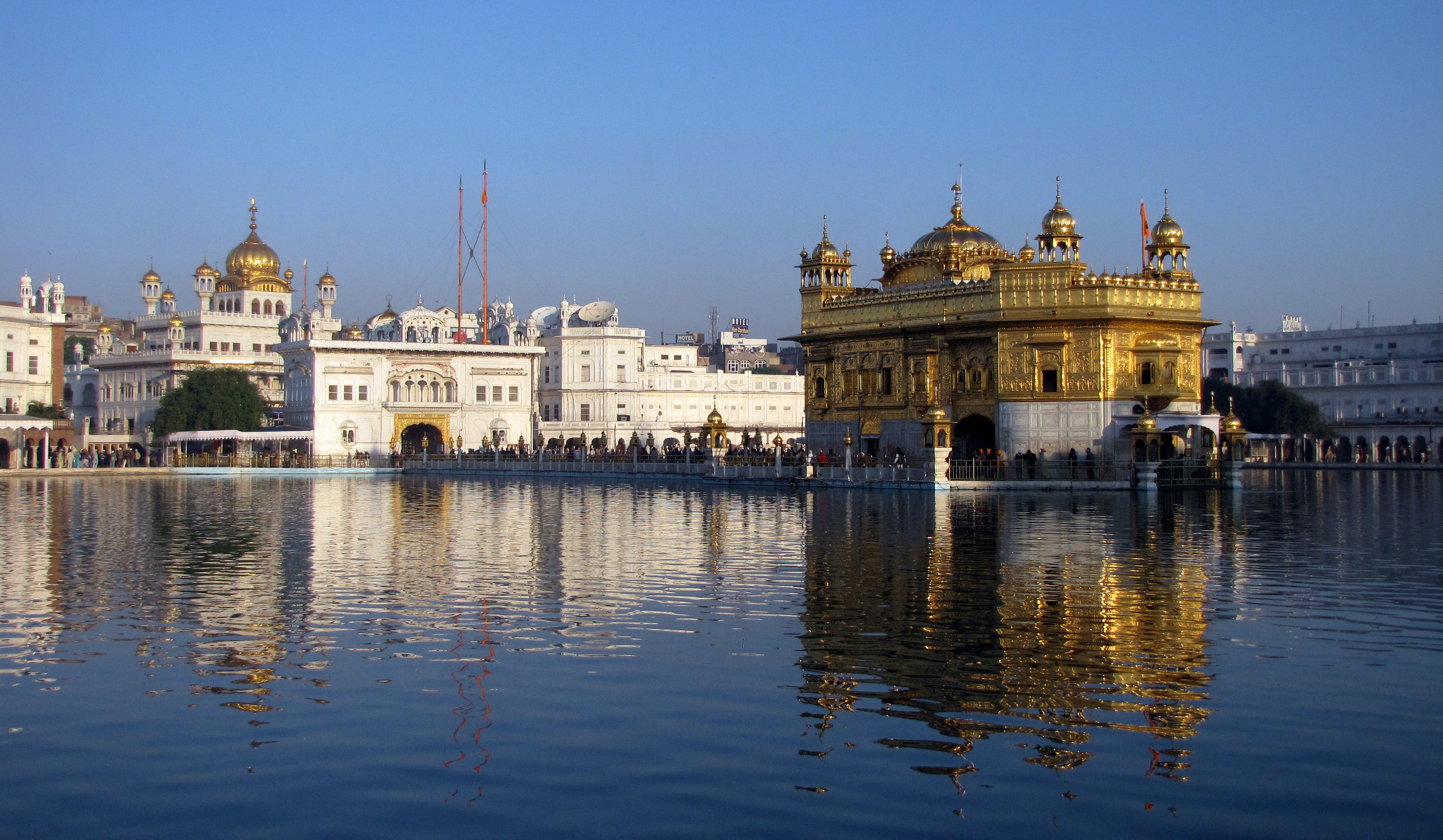
Akal Takht and Harmandir Sahib (Golden Temple), was repaired by the Sikhs afterOperation Blue Star.

Sikh missionary Jarnail Singh Bhindranwale heard that in 1982 the government had created a model of the Darbar Sahib in Dehra Dun and were planning an attack. Historians argue that Gandhi's assumption of emergency powers in 1975 resulted in the weakening of the "legitimate and impartial machinery of government" and her increasing "paranoia" of opposing political groups led her to instigate a "despotic policy of playing castes, religions and political groups against each other for political advantage." As a reaction against these actions came the emergence of the Sikh leader Sant Jarnail Singh Bhindranwale who vocalised Sikh sentiment for justice. This accelerated Punjab into a state of peaceful protests.

Sikhs did not get an autonomous region or even a state so following India's independence in 1947, the Punjabi Suba movement led by the Sikh political party Akali Dal trifurcated the Punjab state. Afterwards the government assured the Sikhs that only excess water would go to other states, after 5 years Chandigarh would be the capital and Sikhism would be considered a separate religion as it had been for the past centuries. Those promises were not fulfilled as 83.5% of Punjab's waters were and still are going to other states leading to desertification, Sikhs are still a part of the Hindu Marriage Act and Chandigarh is still a union territory. Subsequently, a section of the Sikh leaders started demanding more autonomy for the states, alleging that the central government was discriminating against Punjab. The early stages of the Sikh agitation for equal rights were peaceful, leading one commentator to note:

"...over 100,000 [Sikh] volunteers have been arrested. This high number of arrests is undoubtedly, a national record and so has been the peaceful nature in which the Satyagrahas [protests] of this magnitude have been handled by the Sikhs, with extreme tolerance."

In September 1981, Bhindranwale voluntarily offered his arrest in Amritsar, where he was detained and interrogated for twenty-five days, but was released because of lack of evidence. "For all I know, he [Bhindranwale] is completely innocent and is genuinely and exclusively dedicated to the teachings of the Gurus.” In December 1983, a senior officer in Chandigarh confessed: “It’s really shocking that we have so little against him [Bhindranwale] while we keep blaming him for all sorts of things.”

Bhindranwale and his followers were armed with traditional swords, shields and muskets. Few also had Dragunov Rifles, Kashganovs, Ak-74s and Ak-47s. These were licensed and supplied by the Indian Government. It was the peak of the Cold War and India was leaning towards Russia and Pakistan had allied with The United States of America. This is why Bhindranwale was carrying Russian made guns. The Indian Government started alleging that Bhindranwale was killing Hindus and allied with Pakistan to create Khalistan. The first time that the phrase Khalistan came was in the Hind Samachar newspaper group. The Indian secret operation called Black Cats was made by Indira Gandhi to disguise the Punjab Police as terrorists and kill Hindus in the countryside. Bhindranwale condemned these but it was not outlined on any newspapers as they were government controlled. He also made a speech that he did not hate Hindus and he had donated 5 lakhs to restore ald Hindu and Sikh architecture and Mandirs. He even adopted a Hindu women as his daughter.

In June 1984, the Indian Government ordered a military operation, Operation Blue Star to clear Harmandir Sahib, Amritsar and thirty other Gurdwaras of Sikhs led by Jarnail Singh Bhindranwale who were with many other pilgrims. During this operation, the Indian army had more than 3,000 casualties with 700 injuries, and 200–250 Sikh militants were killed. The handling of the operation, damage to the holy shrine and loss of life on both sides, led to widespread criticism of the Indian Government. The Indian Prime Minister Indira Gandhi was assassinated by her two Sikh bodyguards in retaliation. Following her death 17,000 of Sikhs were killed in the 1984 anti-Sikh riots. The subsequent Punjab insurgency saw several secessionist militant groups becoming active in Punjab, supported by a section of the Sikh diaspora. Indian security forces suppressed the insurgency in the early 1990s by doing genocide upon the innocent Sikhs; over 2,500,000 Sikhs died, according to Jaswant Sikh Khalra, who was also killed by the police in a fake encounter for being against the Government. Many government officials and police officers were either secretly rewarded for their actions against Sikhs or did not face consequences until much later, and a lot of evidence was destroyed in order to hide these acts of violence.

Gandhi's 1984 action to remove Sant Jarnail Singh Bhindranwale led to desecration of the Golden Temple in Operation Blue Star and ultimately led to Gandhi's assassination by her Sikh bodyguards. Many sources state that as much as 5 hundred thousand innocent Sikhs died by Indian police and rioters after June 1984 and Sikh population started decreasing after 1986.

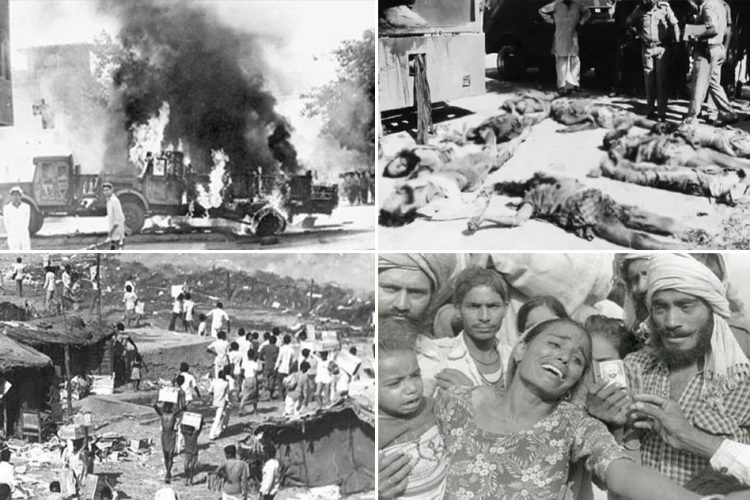
1984 anti-Sikh riots in Delhi-Haryana areas.

"Any knowledge of the "Amritdharis" who are dangerous people and pledged to committing murder, arson and acts of terrorism should be immediately brought to the notice of the authorities. These people may appear harmless from outside but they are basically committed to terrorism. In the interest of us all, their identity and whereabouts must always be disclosed.- Indira Gandhi during Operation Woodrose

This led to the Sarbat Khalsa advocating the creation of a Sikh autonomous homeland, Khalistan. This resulted in an explosion of violence against the Sikh community in the Anti Sikh Riots which resulted in the massacre of thousands of Sikhs throughout India; Khushwant Singh described the actions as being a Sikh pogrom in which he "felt like a refugee in my country. In fact, I felt like a Jew in Nazi Germany."In 2002 the claims of the popular right-wing Hindu organisation the RSS, that "Sikhs are Hindus" angered Sikh sensibilities. Many Sikhs still are campaigning for justice for victims; only one person has gone to jail in the 1984 anti-Sikh riots, of the violence and the political and economic needs of the Punjab espoused in the Khalistan movement.

=== Sikh Equality Movement (1984-1996) ===
In the wake of the Indian government's repression of Sikhs, some Sikhs formed guerrilla bands to take on the marauding police. At the height of the Sikh resistance movement, hundreds of men fought the so-called security forces in Punjab. Some also engaged in targeted assassinations elsewhere in India, the best known being the killing of General Vaidya, who had led the Indian army in the attack on the Golden Temple. The main groups were the Babbar Khalsa, the Bhindranwala Tigers Force of Khalistan, Khalistan Commando Force, the Khalistan Liberation Force and the All India Sikh Students Federation.

Many members joined the resistance after being radicalized by the army dragnet of the summer of 1984, designated Operation Woodrose, in which youths aged 15–24 were taken away from their homes in large numbers. Most had lost relatives or friends to army or police. Others had witnessed womenfolk being picked up by the police for torture and abuse. Many had been personally tortured before taking up arms against the state.

=== Post-1996 ===
In 1996 the Special Rapporteur for the Commission on Human Rights on freedom of religion or belief, Abdelfattah Amor (Tunisia, 1993–2004), visited India in order to compose a report on religious discrimination. In 1997, Amor concluded, "it appears that the situation of the Sikhs in the religious field is satisfactory, but that difficulties are arising in the political (foreign interference, terrorism, etc.), economic (in particular with regard to sharing of water supplies) and even occupational fields. Information received from nongovernment [sic] sources indicates that discrimination does exist in certain sectors of the public administration; examples include the decline in the number of Sikhs in the police force and the absence of Sikhs in personal bodyguard units since the murder of Indira Gandhi." The reduced intake of the Sikhs in the Indian armed forces also attributes to following certain orders issued in the Indian Emergency of 1975/1977.

== List of battles fought by Sikhs ==
1. Battle of Rohilla
2. Battle of Kartarpur
3. Battle of Amritsar (1634)
4. Battle of Lahira
5. Battle of Bhangani
6. Battle of Nadaun
7. Battle of Guler (1696)
8. Battle of Basoli
9. First Battle of Anandpur
10. Battle of Nirmohgarh (1702)
11. Second Battle of Anandpur
12. First Battle of Chamkaur (1702)
13. First Battle of Anandpur (1704)
14. Second Battle of Anandpur (1704)
15. Battle of Sarsa
16. Second Battle of Chamkaur (1704)
17. Battle of Muktsar
18. Battle of Sonepat
19. Battle of Ambala
20. Battle of Samana
21. Battle of Chappar Chiri
22. Battle of Sadhaura
23. Battle of Rahon (1710)
24. Battle of Lohgarh
25. Battle of Jammu
26. Battle of Kapuri (1709)
27. Battle of Jalalabad (1710)
28. Siege of Gurdaspur or Battle of Gurdas Nangal
29. Battle of Wan (1726)
30. Battle of Sarai Nurdin
31. Siege of Ram Rauni
32. Battle of Amritsar (1757)
33. Battle of Lahore (1759)
34. Battle of Sialkot (1761)
35. Battle of Gujranwala (1761)
36. Sikh Occupation of Lahore
37. Vadda Ghalughara or Battle of Kup
38. Battle of Harnaulgarh
39. Skirmish of Amritsar (1762)
40. Battle of Sialkot (1763)
41. Battle of Sirhind (1764)
42. Rescue of Hindu Girls (1769)
43. Sikh raids on Delhi
44. Battle of Delhi (1783)
45. Battle of Amritsar (1797)
46. Battle of Gujrat (1797)
47. Battle of Amritsar (1798)
48. Gurkha-Sikh War
49. Battle of Attock
50. Battle of Multan
51. Battle of Shopian
52. Battle of Peshawar (1834)
53. Battle of Jamrud
54. Sino-Sikh War
55. Battle of Mudki
56. Battle of Ferozeshah
57. Battle of Baddowal
58. Battle of Aliwal
59. Battle of Sobraon
60. Battle of Chillianwala
61. Battle of Ramnagar
62. Siege of Multan (several)
63. Battle of Gujrat
64. Battle of Saragarhi
65. Battle of Babeli

== See also ==
- Sikh Ajaibghar
- Mehdiana Sahib
- Sikh period in Lahore
- Sikh culture
- Sikh architecture
- Sikh scriptures
