= Khalsa Fauj =

Sikh army and militia between 1699 – 1735

- Active: 13 April 1699 – 29 March 1748
- Allegiance: Khalsa
- Type: Army (1699–1716); Militia (1716–1748)
- Headquarters: Anandpur (1699–1704); Lohgarh (Bilaspur) (1709–1716)
- Wars: Mughal-Sikh Wars

Commanders
- Leaders: Guru Gobind Singh (founder; 1699–1708); Banda Singh Bahadur (1708–1716); Mata Sahib Kaur (1708–1747); Mata Sundar Kaur (1708–1747); Panj Pyare (group of five baptized Sikhs)
- Commanders: Daya Singh; Dharam Singh; Himmat Singh; Mohkam Singh; Sahib Singh; Mata Bhag Kaur; Binod Singh; Fateh Singh
- Notable warriors: Sahibzada Ajit Singh; Sahibzada Jujhar Singh; Sahibzada Zorawar Singh; Sahibzada Fateh Singh
- Predecessor: Akal Sena
- Successor: Dal Khalsa

Insignia
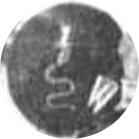
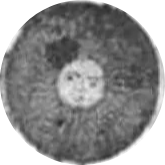
- Iconography

The Khalsa Fauj (lit. 'Army of the Pure') were the military forces of the Khalsa order of the Sikhs, established by the tenth guru, Guru Gobind Singh, in 1699. It replaced the Akal Sena that had been established by the sixth guru, Guru Hargobind.

== History ==
=== Origin ===
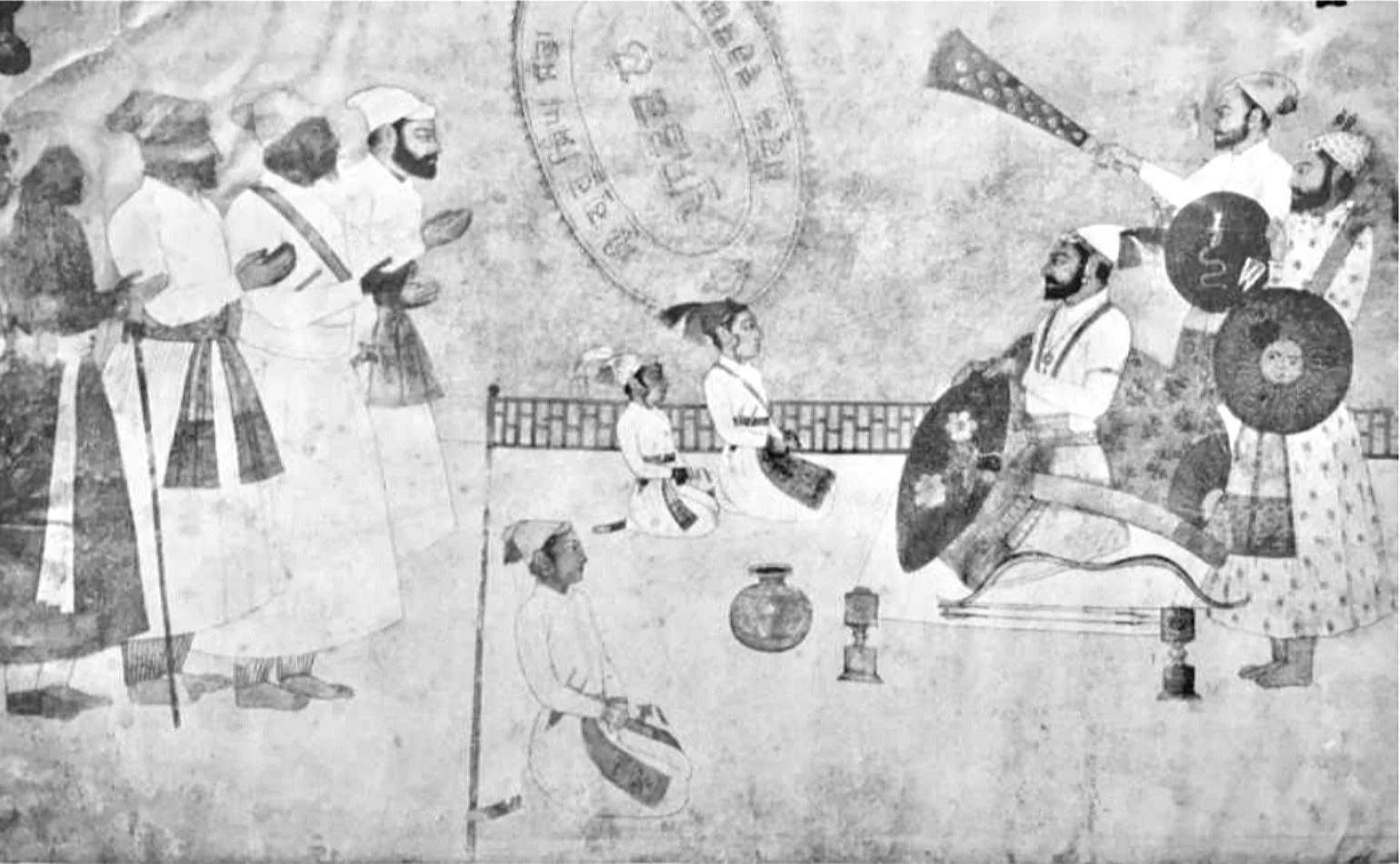
Guru Gobind Singh with three of his sons (minus Fateh Singh) and retinue at the Anandpur Darbar in the year 1698

Guru Gobind Singh succeeded his father, Guru Tegh Bahadur, as guru in 1675. He felt that the Akal Sena was not living up to the challenge and sought to reform the Sikh military forces. Therefore, it was replaced by the Khalsa Fauj after the formalization of the Khalsa order into the sanctified framework of Sikhism at Anandpur on 30 March 1699. Guru Gobind Singh had an ultimate vision of Sikh sovereignty.

It is a Holy Army of the Deathless (Akal), at once pure and perfect, baptized and sculptured in purity of love and total sacrifice. It sustains itself purely on the Divine Name. Khalsa remains untouched by the world of sin, impurity and evil.

— Partap Singh Jaspal, Eternal Glory of Guru Gobind Singh Ji & Khalsa (2003 reprint), page 59

The precedence and authority for establishing the Khalsa Fauj was traced back to the teachings of Guru Nanak. It was committed to freeing the Punjab of foreign domination. The army followed the principle of violence only when all other means to address an issue have been exhausted, a principle of dharamyudh (righteous warfare).

=== Guru Gobind Singh ===
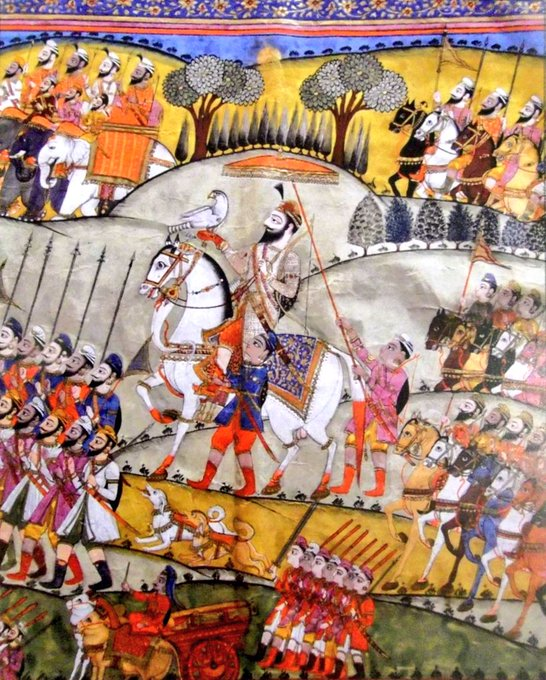
Painting of Guru Gobind Singh on horseback and holding bird of prey while marching with the Khalsa Fauj

The Khalsa Fauj frequently warred with the Mughal Empire and Rajas belonging to various Hill States of the Shivalik Hills. The army had to relocate from Anandpur in 1704. A short-lived reconciliation between the Mughals and Sikhs occurred in 1707, when Gobind Singh and his Khalsa Fauj spent around 10 months encamped alongside the Imperial Mughal Army of Bahadur Shah whilst the latter was campaigning in Rajasthan. However, Gobind Singh felt that the Mughal emperor was avoiding having discussions with him on the issue of Punjab and therefore he sent Banda Singh Bahadur to the northwest to place pressure on the Mughals.

=== Banda Singh Bahadur ===
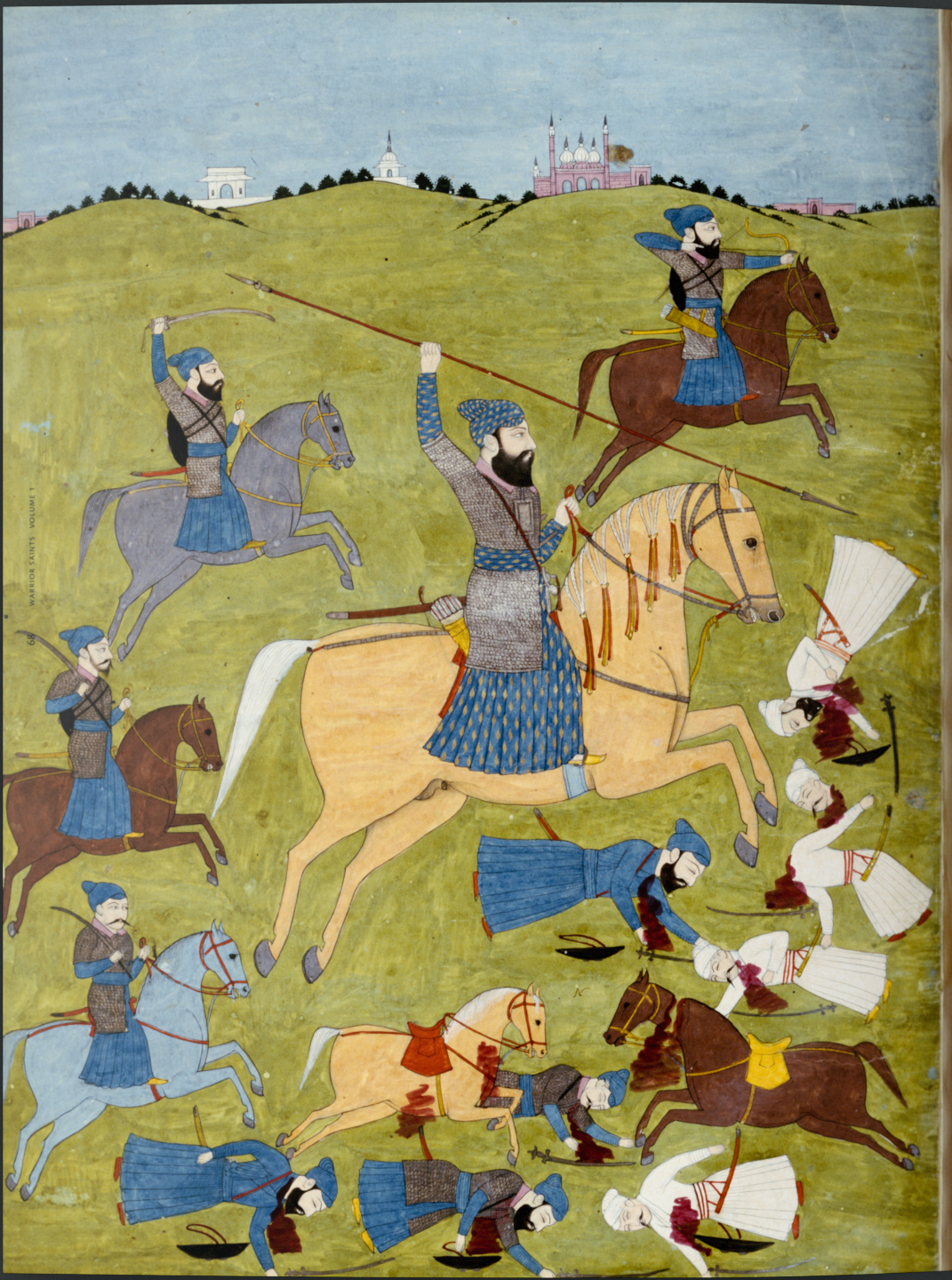
Painting from an illustrated folio of a Mughal manuscript depicting the Battle of Sirhind (1710), also known as the Battle of Chappar Chiri. From the ‘Tawarikh-i Jahandar Shah’, Awadh or Lucknow, ca.1770. The Sikh Khalsa forces are dressed in blue whilst the Mughals are wearing white

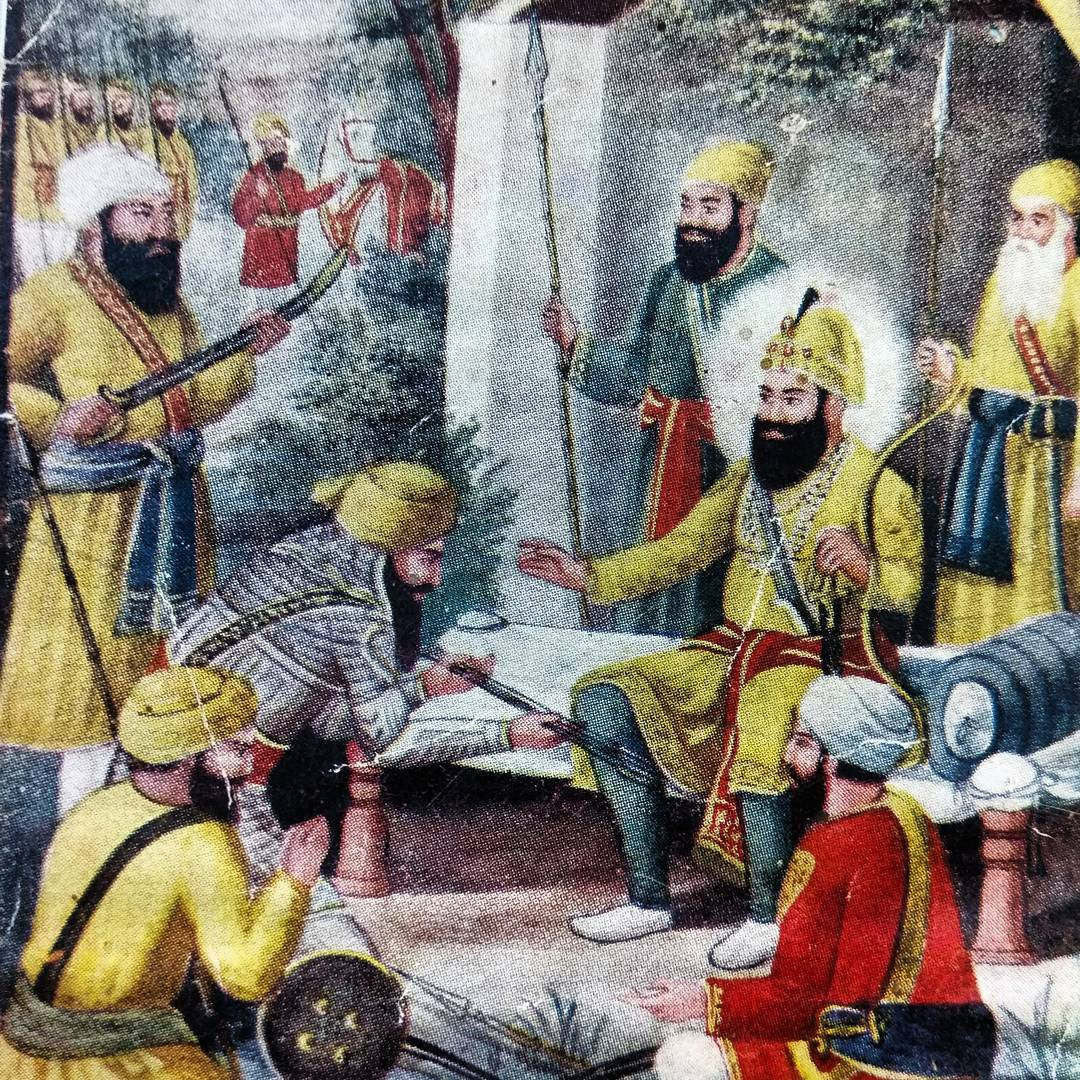
Painting of Banda Singh Bahadur being blessed with five arrows by Guru Gobind Singh, by Gian Singh Naqqash, ca.1930

Banda Singh Bahadur had been given the mantle of leadership by the Guru himself when he was blessed with five arrows from the Guru's own quiver as a symbol of victory. The Guru saw potential in Banda as a warrior against tyranny and injustice, therefore he prepared him for future missions and assigned a group of Panj Pyare (five beloved ones), consisting of Binod Singh, Kahan Singh, Baj Singh, Daya Singh, and Ram Singh, to assist the newly converted Sikh in his affairs, alongside 20 other Sikh warriors. Banda Singh was promoted to Jathedar of the Panth (General of the Khalsa) on 5 October 1708 by the Guru. Banda and his retinue were instructed to go to Sirhind to take revenge for the tyranny of the local Mughal governor of the area. After the passing of Guru Gobind Singh at Nanded in the Deccan (located modern-day Maharashtra), Banda Singh Bahadur became the caretaker of the Khalsa Fauj. He would go on to rebel against the Mughal empire and form the first sovereign Sikh republican state, ruling over parts of the Punjab, especially in the southeastern regions, albeit the polity was a short-lived one. Most of the recruits into the Khalsa Fauj during the years of Banda's reign drew from the Jat peasantry. The headquarters at this time was Lohgarh. Banda and 2,000 of his followers were captured and publicly executed in 1716 by the Mughals.

=== Post-Banda ===
After the death of Banda Singh Bahadur, the Khalsa Fauj divided into various jathas (armed group or band of Sikhs). Since the Sikh community had dispersed to the jungles, deserts, and mountains to avoid state persecution, the focus of the Khalsa Fauj turned to plunder for the time being. There was no clear leader during this period. Small groups of bands of Sikh horsemen still carried out guerilla ambushes on the enemy when the opportunity arose. The period between the death of Banda Singh Bahadur and the hegemony of the Sikh Confederacy is one of the darkest annals in Sikh history, with the Khalsa Fauj fighting for the very survival of the Sikh community faced with certain elimination by genocide perpetrated by Emperor Farrukhsiyar. By the 1720s, the rebellion of the Sikhs had been extinguished. During this time, Abdus Samad Khan, a Turani official and commander of the Mughal military stationed in Punjab, had a very harsh policy against the Sikhs. Any Sikh which was found was given the choice of conversion to Islam or death. When Zakaria Khan, son of Abdus Saman Khan, became the subahdar (governor) of Lahore subah (province) in 1726, he wanted the Sikhs to join the Mughal cause against the Afghan invaders or at the very least remain neutral but things did not work out that way.

== Army details ==
=== Tactics ===
Significance was heavily placed on cavalry and hand-to-hand combat on horseback. The Khalsa Fauj used guerrilla warfare tactics.

=== Equipment ===
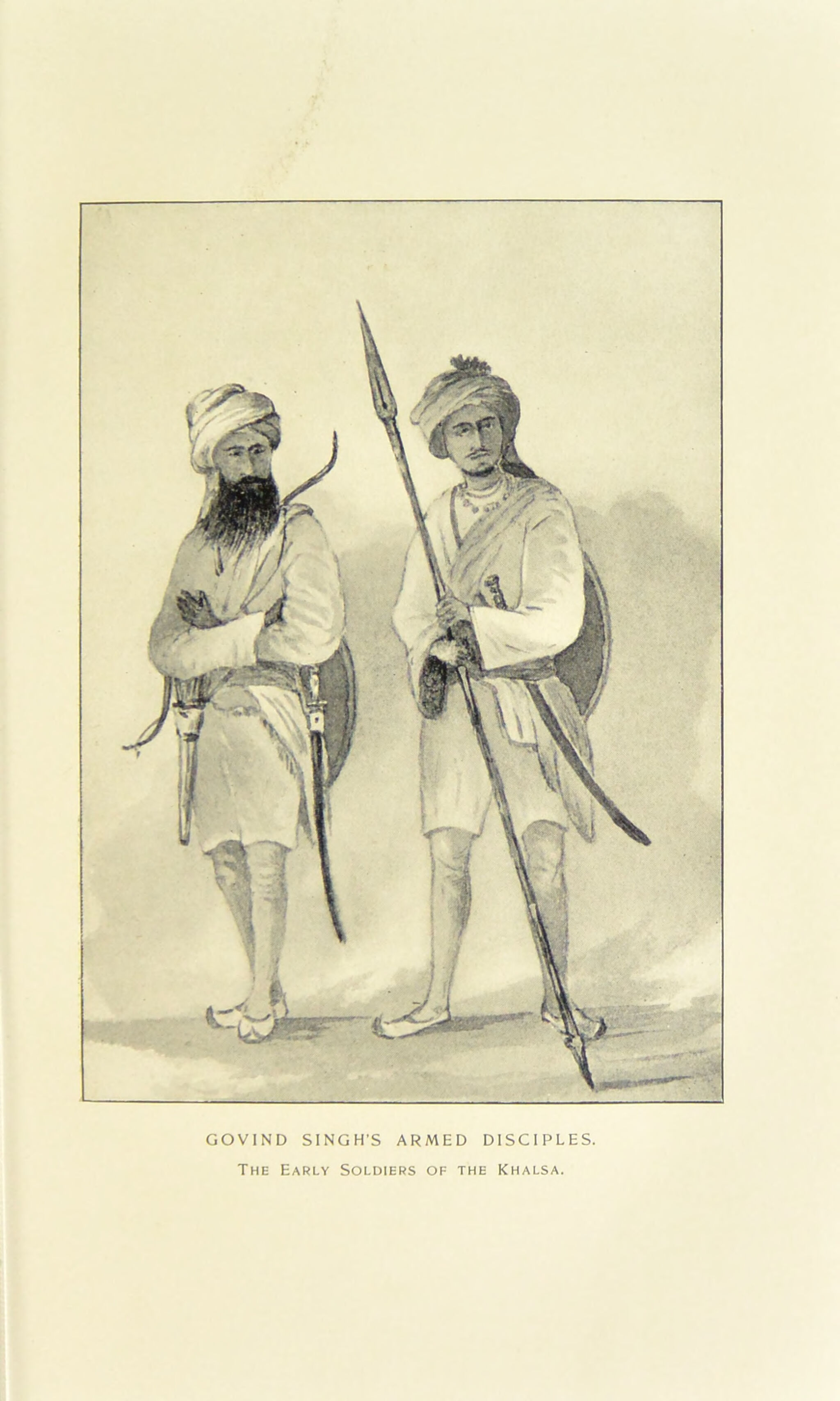
Illustration titled 'Guru Govind Singh’s armed disciples, the early soldiers of the Khalsa' from The Sikhs (1904) by John James Hood Gordon

Horses for the army were sourced from small zamindars (feudal lords) located between the Ravi and Beas rivers. Some warriors possessed matchlock guns whilst others still used bows and arrows.

=== Organization ===
Various village chieftains made-up the ranks of the Khalsa Fauj under Guru Gobind Singh. Some chiefs had a larger group of warriors under them (up to hundreds) whilst others only had a few. The base-of-operations for these chiefs was usually their native village, which were often fortified.

=== Pay ===
There was no regular salary for soldiers in the Khalsa Fauj during the period of Guru Gobind Singh. Rather, they had the chance to plunder their enemies' estates under a religious cause.

== Symbols ==
=== Coiled snake ===
Guru Gobind Singh compared the Khalsa Fauj to a coiled snake ready to pounce, which he calls the pechida maar, in his Zafarnama (epistle of victory) letter addressed to Aurangzeb:

چھا شد کہ چوں بچگان کشته چار
که باقی بماند است پیچیده مار
You killed my four sons:
What difference does that make,
When after their deaths there still
Remains behind a coiled snake?

— written by Guru Gobind Singh, translated by Navtej Sarna, Zafarnama, verse 78

=== Colour ===
Illustrated folio depicting a Nishan Sahib (Sikh religious flag) from a Guru Granth Sahib manuscript housed at Takht Keshgarh Sahib, Anandpur and dated to 1714 CE

The uniform and colours of the Khalsa Fauj were blue due to Guru Gobind Singh witnessing his youngest son, Fateh Singh, donning such garbs in this colour. Thereafter he standardized them in his army.

== Successor ==
It was succeeded by the Dal Khalsa of the Sikh Confederacy, established by Nawab Kapur Singh in the 1730s. The Sarbat Khalsa united the various jathas of the Khalsa Fauj into more organized and streamlined formations. This reform would lead to the Sikh Confederacy, ruled by various misls.

== Legacy ==
Sikh armies in later periods up till the present are sometimes called "Khalsa Fauj", including the military forces of the Sikh Empire, the Sikh Khalsa Army. During the 2020–2021 Indian farmers' protest, songs were made that compared the victorious protesting farmers to the Khalsa Fauj of Guru Gobind Singh.

== Timeline ==
- 1699 – Founding of the Khalsa Panth, the functionalities and institution of the Akal Sena is absorbed into the Khalsa Fauj
- 1699 – Battle of Anandpur (1699)
- 1700 – Battle of Anandpur (1700)
- 1700 – First siege of Anandpur (1700)
- 1700 – Battle of Taragarh
- 1702 – Battle of Basoli
- 1702 – First Battle of Chamkaur
- 7 March 1703 – Siege of Bassi Kalan
- 1704 – First Battle of Anandpur (1704)
- May to December 1704 – Second siege of Anandpur (1704)
- 21 December 1704 – Battle of Sarsa
- 21 December 1704 – Battle of Shahi Tibbi
- 22–23 December 1704 – Second Battle of Chamkaur
- 29 December 1705 – Battle of Muktsar
- 1707 – Battle of Baghaur
- 20 June 1707 – Battle of Jajau
- 2 April 1708 – Battle of Chittorgarh
- 5 October 1708 – Banda Singh Bahadur is promoted to general of the Khalsa Fauj by Guru Gobind Singh and sent on a mission to conquer Punjab
- 7 October 1708 – passing of Guru Gobind Singh due to partially healed wounds, from an injury sustained in a previous assassination attempt, opening up
- 6 and 12 April 1709 - Battle of Amritsar
- 1709 – Battle of Sonipat
- 1709 – Battle of Kaithal
- 26 November 1709 – Battle of Samana
- 1709 – Battle of Ghuram
- 1709 – Battle of Sanaur
- 1709 – Battle of Thaska
- 1709 – Battle of Shahabad
- 1709 – Battle of Mustafabad
- 1709 – Battle of Dhamala
- 1709 – Battle of Ambala
- 1709 – Battle of Kunjpura
- 1709 – Battle of Thanesar
- 1709 – Battle of Kapuri
- 1709 – Battle of Karnal
- 1709 – Battle of Panipat
- 1710 – Battle of Sadhaura
- 12 May 1710 – Battle of Chappar Chiri
- May 12-May 14, 1710 – Siege of Sirhind and establishment of the first Sikh state
- 1710 – Battle of Banur
- 1710 - Battle of Buria
- July 1710 - Battle of Saharanpur
- 1710 – Battle of Behat
- 1710 – Battle of Ambheta
- July 1710 - Battle of Nanautu
- 1710 - Battle of Jalalabad
- 1710 – Battle of Muzaffarnagar
- 1710 - Battle of Bharath
- 1710 - Siege of Kotla Begun
- October 1710 - Battle of Bhilowal
- 11 October 1710 - Battle of Rahon
- 1710 – Battle of Kalanaur
- 1710 – Battle of Batala
- 1710 – Battle of Pathankot
- 13 November 1710 - Battle of Thanesar
- 10 December 1710 - Battle of Lohgarh
- 1711 - Battle of Bilaspur
- 1711 - Battle of Kullu
- 1711 - Battle of Bahrampar
- 1711 - Battle of Kalanaur
- 1711 - Battle of Batala
- 1711 - Battle of Aurangabad
- 1711 - Battle of Pasrur
- January 22, 1712 – Battle of Jammu
- 1712 - Battle of Sadhaura
- December 1712 - Battle Of Lohgarh
- 1713 - Siege of Sadhaura
- 1713 - Battle of Lohgarh
- 1714 - Battle of Kiri Pathan
- 1714 - Battle of Ropar
- 1715 - Battle of Kalanaur
- 1715 - Battle of Batala
- 1715 – Battle of Gurdas Nangal
- 1715 - Siege of Gurdaspur - fall of the first Sikh state soon after battle and capture of Banda Singh and his followers by the Mughal forces
- June 1716 – Banda and 2,000 of his followers are brutally executed publicly in Delhi by the Mughals
- 1716 – 1726 – Abdus Saman Khan viciously persecutes Sikhs, trying to wipe them out entirely. Khalsa Fauj evacuates the community to remote areas and initiates a guerilla warfare against the Mughal authority
- 1726 – Zakaria Khan becomes the new governor of Lahore province. He attempts to neuter the Sikh aggression towards the Mughals or get them to join the Mughal camp against the Afghans but fails in either objective
- 1731 - Battle of Thikriwala
- 1733-1735 – succeeded by the Dal Khalsa of the Sikh Confederacy

== See also ==
- Sant Sipahi
- Miri piri
- Gatka
- Shastar Vidya
- Degh Tegh Fateh
- Dharamyudh
