= Banda Singh Bahadur =

Sikh military commander (1670–1716)

Banda Singh Jathedar
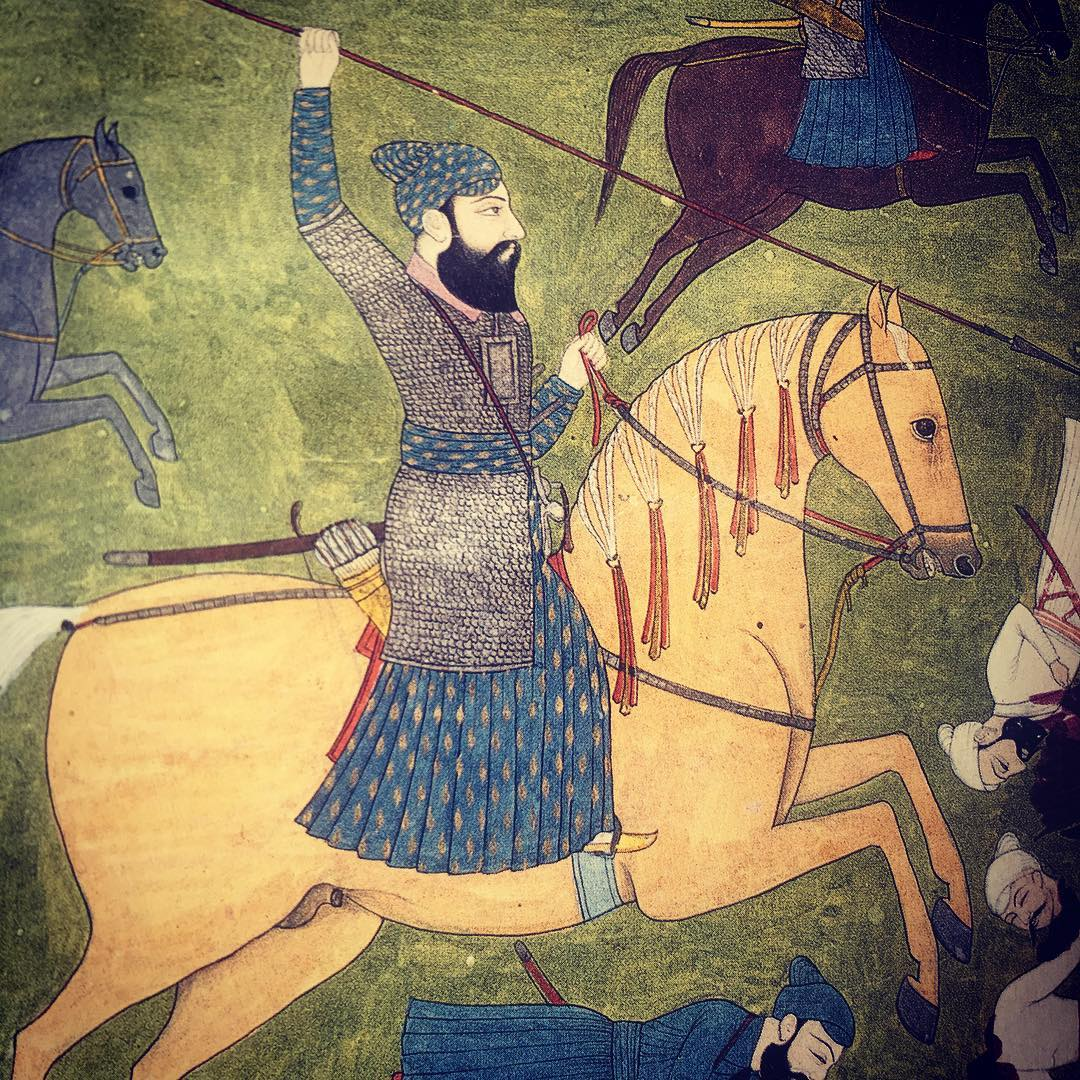
- Depiction of Banda Singh Bahadur, during the Battle of Sirhind (1710), from an illustrated folio of ‘Tawarikh-i Jahandar Shah’, Awadh or Lucknow, c. 1770

Jathedar
- Reign: 26 November 1709 – 7 December 1715
- Predecessor: Position established
- Successor: Position disestablished
- Born: Lachman Dev; 27 October 1670; Rajauri, Poonch, Mughal Empire (present-day Jammu and Kashmir, India)
- Died: 9 June 1716 (aged 45); Delhi, Mughal Empire (present-day India)
- Spouses: Susheel Kaur; Sahib Kaur
- Issue: Ajay Singh; Ranjit Singh
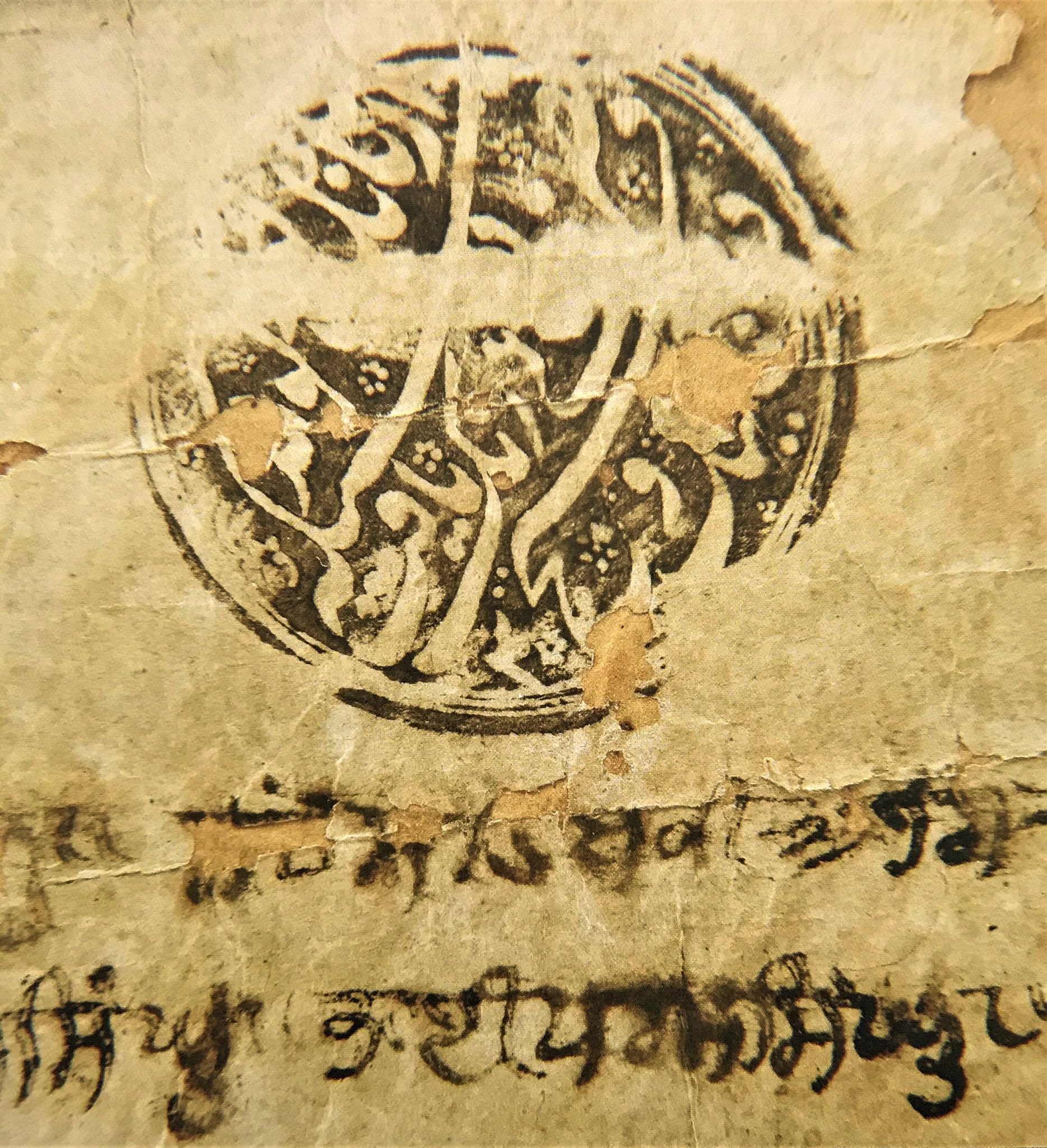
- Signature

Religious life
- Religion: Sikhism

Religious career
- Teacher: Guru Gobind Singh
- Military career
- Other names: Madho Das Bairagi; Banda Bairagi
- Allegiance: Khalsa; Khalsa Fauj; First Sikh State
- Service years: 1708–1716
- Rank: Jathedar
- Conflicts: Battle of Sonipat; Battle of Samana; Battle of Kapuri; Battle of Sadhaura; Battle of Ropar (1710); Battle of Chappar Chiri; Siege of Sirhind; Battle of Saharanpur; Battle of Jalalabad (1710); Battle of Thanesar (1710); Siege of Kotla Begum (1710); Battle of Bhilowal; Battle of Rahon; First Battle of Lohgarh; Battle of Bilaspur (1711); Battle of Jammu (1712); Second Battle of Lohgarh; Battle of Kiri Pathan (1714); Siege of Gurdaspur; Battle of Gurdas Nangal

Banda Singh Bahadur (born Lachman Dev; 27 October 1670 – 9 June 1716) was a Sikh military commander of the Khalsa Army. At age 15, he left home to become an ascetic, and was given the name Madho Das Bairagi. He established a monastery at Nānded, on the bank of the river Godāvarī. In 1707, Guru Gobind Singh accepted an invitation to meet Mughal Emperor Bahadur Shah I in southern India, he visited Banda Singh Bahadur in 1708. Banda became disciple of Guru Gobind Singh and was given a new name, Gurbaksh Singh (as written in Mahan Kosh), after the baptism ceremony. He is popularly known as Banda Singh Bahadur. He was given five arrows by the Guru as a blessing for the battles ahead. He came to Khanda, Sonipat and assembled a fighting force and led the struggle against the Mughal Empire.

His first major action was the sacking of the Mughal provincial capital, Samana, in November 1709. After establishing his authority and the Sikh Republic in Punjab, Banda Singh Bahadur abolished the zamindari (feudal) system, and granted property rights to the tillers of the land. Banda Singh was captured by the Mughals and tortured to death in 1715–1716.

== Early life ==
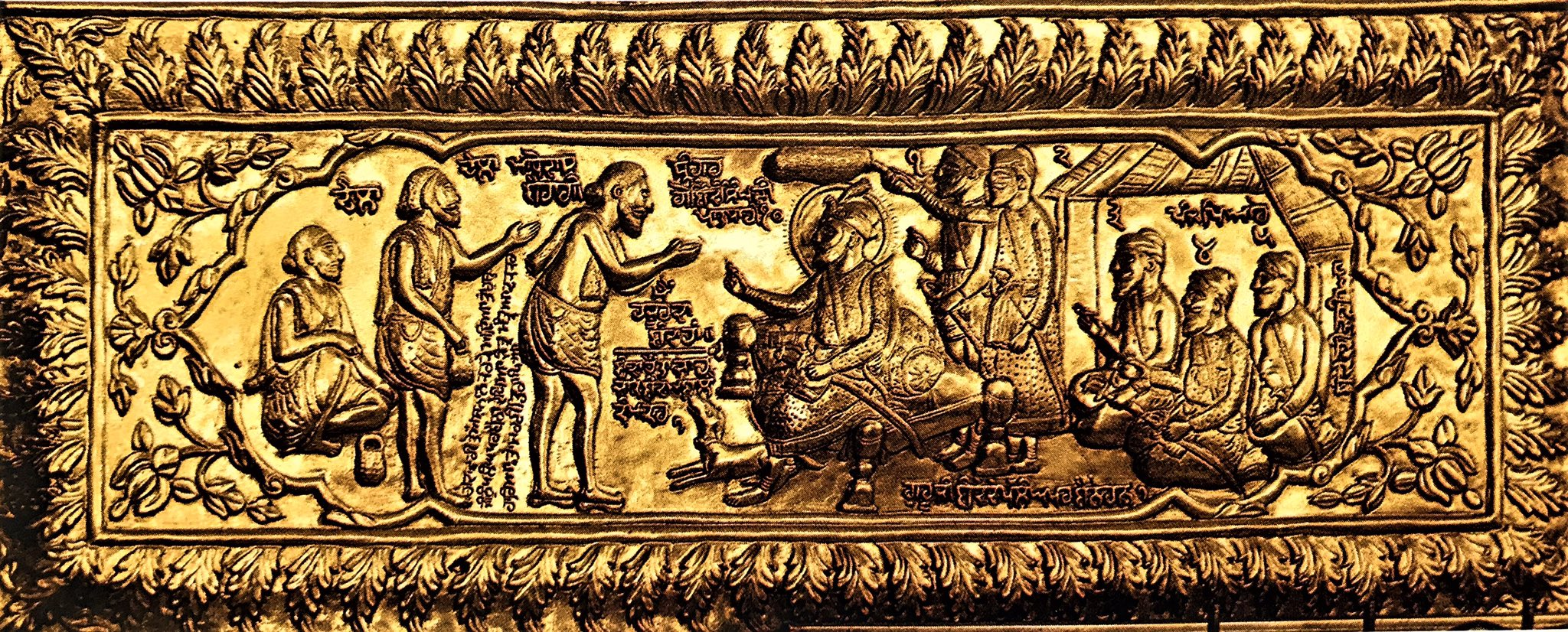
Gilded panel (repoussé plaque) from Takht Hazur Sahib, Nanded. Madho Das declares he is Guru Gobind Singh's ‘Banda’ slave

Banda Singh Bahadur was born as Lachman Dev in a Hindu family to farmer Ram Dev, at Rajouri (now in Jammu and Kashmir) on 27 October 1670. While a lot of claims have been made on the caste that Banda Bahadur belonged to, primary sources from his lifetime such as the Akhbar-i-Darbar-i-Mualla or the Sri Gur Sobha make no mention of his caste or other tribal origins. In much later tradition from the 20th century, he is alternatively called a Dogra Rajput or a Sodhi Khatri. Banda Singh's family was quite poor. Not much is known about his early life other than the fact that Banda Singh was fond of hunting and shooting and learned the arts of horseriding, wrestling, archery, and swordsmanship at a young age and quite quickly. According to a tale about Banda Singh's early life he was once hunting at the age of 15. The sight of the doe dying saddened Banda Singh. He was even deeply hurt when he cut the doe and found two of the doe's babies dying who were not yet born. The event deeply scarred him and led to Banda Singh abandoning worldly affairs and becoming an ascetic. He came into contact of a fellow ascetic named Janaki Prasad. Prasad changed Banda Singh's name, which at the time was Lachman Dev, into Madho Das. Banda Singh established his own Dera (monastery) and took upon a following of some men. Banda was a bairagi, which was a Vaishnavite tradition.

=== Meeting Guru Gobind Singh ===
In 1708 Guru Gobind Singh went to the monastery of Banda Singh, at the time Madho Das. Guru Gobind Singh sat on Banda Singh's seat where the Banda would sit as a saint. According to some sources Guru Gobind Singh also killed the goats there. Upon hearing what happened Banda Singh was filled with rage. Banda Singh used his "magic" to flip the chair the Guru sat on, but nothing happened. Filled with rage Banda Singh made his way to the Guru. Upon seeing the Guru Banda Singh's rage melted. After a conversation with the Guru Banda Singh converted and took Amrit becoming a Khalsa. Madho Das was named Banda Singh by the Guru. Banda Singh was taught in Gurbani and Sikh history. Upon learning of the killing of Zorawar Singh and Fateh Singh, Banda Singh is said to have cried. Guru Gobind Singh told Banda Singh, "When tyranny had overtaken men, it was the duty off the more sensitive to fight against it and even to lay down their life in the struggle". Banda Singh wanted to do such. Banda Singh wished to fulfil Guru Gobind Singh's wish of punishing tyrants and saving the commoners.

== Military campaigns ==
=== Beginning ===
Soon after Guru Gobind Singh was stabbed by two Pathans sent by Wazir Khan and possibly Bahadur Shah I. This is said to have sent Banda Singh into a fury. Banda Singh begged of the Guru to send him into Punjab so he can get revenge for the crimes done on Sikhs and punish the tyrants. In September 1708 Guru Gobind Singh gave Banda Singh the title of Bahadur and gave his full political and military authority to carry on the struggle. Banda Singh was given the duty of punishing wrong-doers and get revenge for the killing of Zorawar Singh and Fateh Singh. He was bestowed with a Nagara (war drum), Nishan Sahib, and 5 arrows of Guru Gobind Singh. He was also given Panj Pyare, Ram Singh, Binod Singh, Kahan Singh, Baj Singh, and Daya Singh to assist him. Banda Singh was also given 20 other Singhs to accompany him. He was told by the Guru to remain honest and pure in heart, to not touch another man's wife, see himself as a servant of the Khalsa and Guru, do all acts after an Ardas and seeking counsel of the Panj Pyare, not to call himself Guru or form his own sects, and not to get ego from victories nor sadness from losses.

Banda Singh was also given Hukamnamas from Guru Gobind Singh telling all Sikhs to join him in his war against the Mughal Empire. He was given the position of Jathedar of the Khalsa. Thus Banda Singh was sent to Punjab with a group of 300 cavalry following him in a distance of 8 kilometers.

During the trip to Punjab Guru Gobind Singh died on 7 October 1708. Banda Singh used a disguise to travel for most of the trip and followed the path Guru Gobind Singh took in Maharashtra and Rajputana. Banda Singh traveled at a rate of 16 kilometres a day. It took a year for him to reach Punjab.

=== Early conquests ===
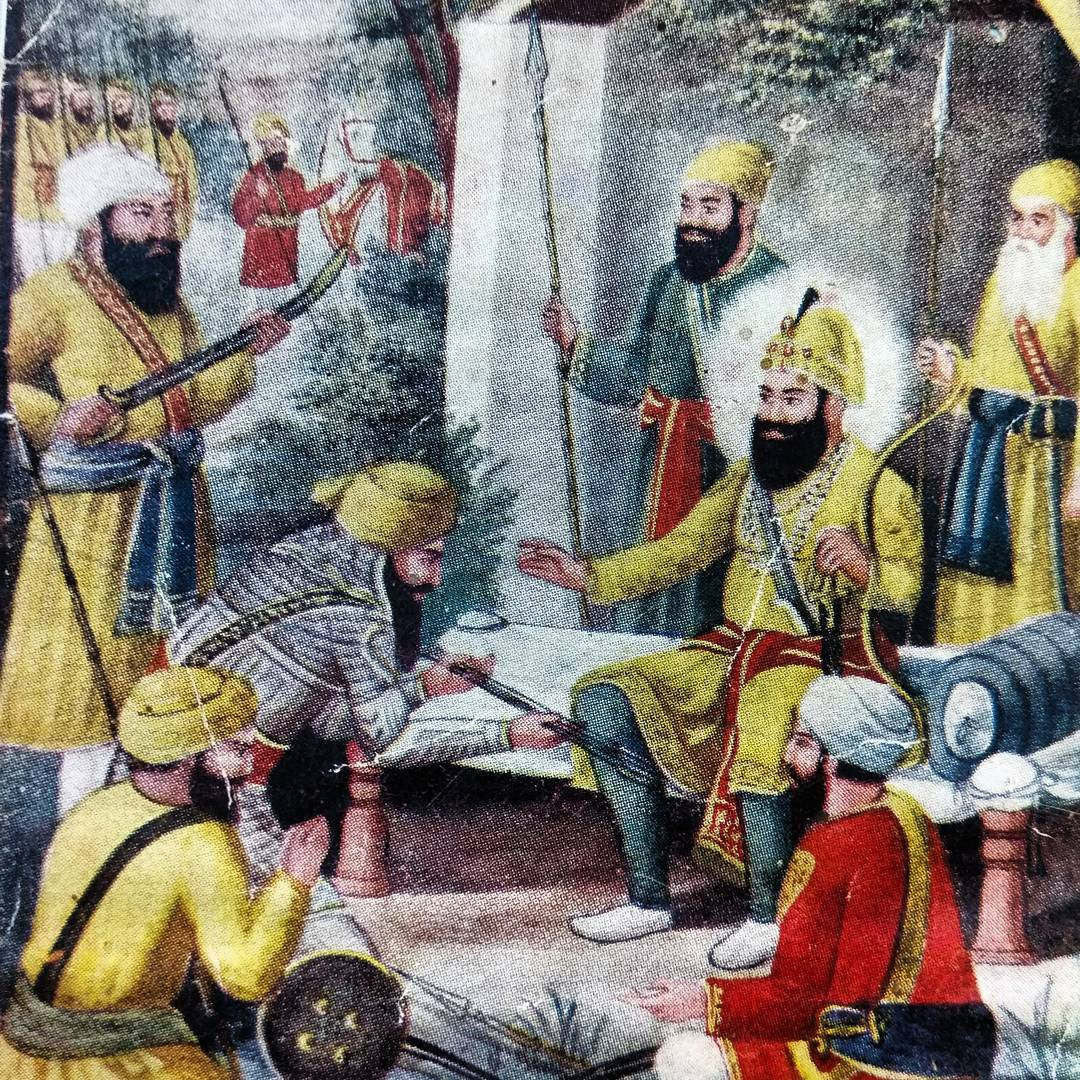
Painting of Banda Singh Bahadur being blessed with five arrows by Guru Gobind Singh, by Gian Singh Naqqash, c. 1930

Banda Singh soon reached modern day Haryana and was soon able to win over the local people. Banda Singh advanced towards the region of Bagar and was successful in subduing local dacoits (bandits) and robbers. He distributed what he captured from the thieves amongst the poor. This incident won Banda Singh fame. He was publicly honoured by the locals with a waving of scarf. Banda Singh was able to gain the support of local villagers and initiated people into the Khalsa. Banda Singh then advanced towards the villages of Sehri and Khanda. It was in these villages that Banda Singh sent letters to the Sikh communities in the Majha, Doaba, and Malwa regions of Punjab to join him on his campaign against the Mughal authorities. It was in these letters that Banda Singh reminded the Sikhs of the cruel deaths of Guru Gobind Singh's two younger sons under the orders of Wazir Khan, the Governor of Sirhind. As a result of these letters, Banda Singh began to receive support from the Sikh communities of Punjab. Banda Singh was joined by Fateh Singh along with Karam Singh and Dharm Singh.Tilok Singh and Ram Singh Phulkian provided soldiers and financial aid to Banda Singh. Ali Singh and Mali Singh, who were previously under the service of Wazir Khan, also joined Banda Singh.

==== Conquest of Sonipat and Kaithal ====
Banda Singh with a force of 500 soldiers lead an attack on Sonipat which war near the imperial capital Delhi. The Faujdar of Sonipat was defeated by the Sikhs resulting in the city being occupied. Banda Singh plundered the imperial treasury and the rich. He distributed the wealth amongst his own men. The conquest on Sonipat so near to Delhi was an open challenge to the Mughals. Banda Singh next set his eyes on Samana. Along the way Banda Singh lead an attack on a Mughal detachment near Kaithal that was carrying imperial treasure headed to Delhi. Banda Singh was successful in taking the treasure from the Mughal authorities. The Amil (Governor) of Kaithal was enraged by this and led an attack on the Sikhs. Banda Singh and the Sikhs fought a hard battle, but being mostly footmen compared to the Mughal cavalry were facing losses. Banda Singh executed a plan where the Sikh force ran into the forest full of thorns forcing the Mughal cavalry to abandon their horses. The Sikhs then popped out of the woods and took the horses. The Mughals were slaughtered in the battle with some surrendering. The Amil was captured by Banda Singh, but was released on the condition he would let the Sikhs keep the horses. The loot captured was distributed amongst Banda Singh's followers.

=== Campaign in Haryana and east ===
Banda Singh decided to head east towards Kiratpur in order to liberate Sikhs of Majha and Doaba held up in Malerkotla and Ropar. Along the way Banda Singh conquered Ghurman and Thaska. Ghurman offered minor resistance whereas Thaska surrendered without any resistance. Banda Singh then advanced upon Kunjpura which was the native village of Wazir Khan. Troops and artillery of Wazir Khan was stationed there but they were defeated by the Sikhs. Banda Singh next attacked Shahabad which was inhabited by Muslims known for committing rape. They were destroyed by Banda Singh and the Sikh forces. Banda Singh also ravaged Damala which was the home of the Pathans who abandoned Guru Gobind Singh in the Battle of Bhangani. Banda Singh next marched upon Mustafabad. The Faujdar of Mustafabad sent 2,000 imperial troops with 2 cannons to stop Banda Singh and the Sikhs. Banda Singh and the Sikhs defeated the Mughals with them leaving behind the cannons in their retreat. The town was plundered and the Faujdar was punished for his tyranny and oppression on the population.

==== Battle of Kapuri ====
Banda Singh heard about Kapuri's Zamindar Qadam-ud-din, his reportedly immoral life and persecution of Hindus and Sikhs. He meddled with Hindu marriages and kidnapped young brides and raped them. Banda Singh immediately attacked Kapuri, and killed Qadam-ud-din capturing his fort. This victory also led to a major capture of booty and war material.

==== Battle of Sadhaura ====
Banda Singh's next sight was Sadhaura. Sadhaura was ruled by Osman Khan, who tortured and executed the Muslim saint Syed Pir Budhu Shah, for helping Guru Gobind Singh in the Battle of Bhagnani. Osman Khan also committed atrocities against Hindus where the cows were slaughtered in front of their homes and forbade Hindus and Sikhs from cremating their dead and performing their religious events. All of this made Sadhaura Banda Singh's target. As Banda Singh advanced on Sadhaura the locals and peasants joined him in revolt. The angry mob became uncontrollable and destroyed all. The Sayyids and Shaikhs were killed. Osman Khan was hanged to death and Sadhaura was captured.

==== Ropar ====
Wazir Khan had found out that the Sikhs from Majha had assembled at Kiratpur Sahib to join Banda Singh. When the Sikhs reached Ropar, Sher Mohammad Khan along with Khizar Khan, Nashtar Khan and Wali Mohammad Khan were there to block the Sikhs passage and offer them a battle. The Mughals had better weapons and a superior number of cavalry while the Sikhs had a small army with insufficient weapons. Both sides faced off in a bloody battle. As they were fighting, there came a bad dust storm which forced both parties to withdraw for the night. On the next day, a fresh contingent of Sikhs arrived to reinforce the remaining Sikhs. Immediately a bullet struck Khizar Khan in the head which caused confusion. Nashtar and Wali Mohammad Khan tried to retrieve the dead body of Khizar Khan but were killed while doing so. Sher Mohammad Khan fled away due to being seriously wounded. With most of their leaders killed, the remaining force retreated back to Sirhind. The Sikh force in Ropar later grouped with Banda Singh Bahadur to prepare for the attack on Sirhind.

=== Conquest of Sirhind ===
==== Preparations ====
The Sikhs were planning to wage dharamyudh against the city of Sirhind, its Governor Wazir Khan and Dewan Sucha Nand, to avenge Mughal oppression and the execution of the two young children of Guru Gobind Singh. This was the main goal of Banda Singh.

Before the battle began, Wazir Khan and Sucha Nand sent the latter's nephew with 1,000 men to Baba Banda Singh Bahadur in a plot to deceive the Sikhs, by falsely claiming to have deserted the Mughals and have come joined the Sikhs for their cause. Wazir Khan had a large well-armed army, which included ghazis, along with a number of artillery, musketeers, and elephants. Khan's army was larger than 20,000.

On the other hand, Banda Singh's army was ill-equipped with long spears, arrows, swords, without artillery and elephants and insufficient amount of horses. According to Ganda Singh, Banda's army consisted of three classes of men where the first class were the devoted Sikhs imbued to crusade against the enemies of their country and religion, the second being the paid recruited soldiers sent by the chieftains of the Phul family, who sympathized with Banda Singh's cause. The third were the irregulars who were professional robbers and dacoits (bandits), eager to seize the opportunity to plunder the city. They were also the most unreliable allies as they would desert when fearing a sign of defeat. Hari Ram Gupta writes that Banda's army consisted of three groups, the first being Sikhs fighting purely to punish Wazir Khan, the second being Sikhs intent on plundering and punishing enemies of their faith. The third being Hindu Jats, Gujars and Rajputs intent on plunder alone.

==== Battle ====
Both sides faced off in Chappar Chiri on 12 May 1710. Upon the firing of artillery by the Mughal Army, the third class of Banda's army, consisting of bandits and irregulars fled, and soon after Sucha Nand's nephew along with his 1,000 men took to flight as well. Baj Singh informed Banda Singh of this. Banda Singh decided to personally entre the frontlines of the battle leading the charge against the Mughals. This motivated the Sikh force who shouted, "Waheguru ji ki Fateh" (Victory belongs to the Wondrous Enlightener) as they charged against the Mughals and their elephants. With only swords two elephants were killed by the Sikhs. The Mughals suffered heavy casualties with the Nawab of Malerkotla, Sher Mohammad Khan, being killed. He was followed by Mughal general Khawaja Ali. Wazir Khan attempted to rally his men as he fired arrows, but was confronted by Baj Singh. Wazir Khan threw a spear at Baj Singh. Both men dueled with Baj Singh injuring Wazir Khan's horse. Wazir Khan shot Baj Singh in the arm with an arrow and reached for his sword to kill him. Fateh Singh charged at Wazir Khan and decapitated Wazir Khan before he could kill Baj Singh. According to Suraj Granth and Maculiffe Wazir Khan was instead killed by Banda Singh who shot him with an arrow from the Guru. As soon as Wazir Khan died the Mughal force fled. Wazir Khan's body would later be tied to an animal and dragged around before being hung onto a tree.

The retreating Mughal force left behind all of their horses, cannons, tents, and ammunition which was all captured by the Sikhs. Sikhs yelled out war cries of "Sat Sri Akaal" (True is the Timeless Lord) as they fell upon Sirhind. Sikhs reached Sirhind by nightfall. The gates had been closed and cannons had been placed to stop the Sikhs. The Sikhs rested for the night. Wazir Khan's family with other Mughal officials had fled to Delhi. On the 13th 500 Sikhs were killed attempting to take Sirhind. By the 14th Sikhs entered Sirhind.

==== Aftermath ====
Filled with rage and revenge Sikhs began to destroy and razed Sirhind to the ground. Sucha Nand was captured and executed. All the booty of Sirhind was captured by Banda Singh. He further abolished the zamindari system (feudal system) and distributed land among the peasants. Banda Singh had ordered that the ownership of the land should be given to the peasants and to let them live in dignity and self-respect.

The entire province of Sirhind and its 28 parganas was under the control of Banda Singh. It extended from the Sutlej to the Yamuna and from the Shivalik hills to Kunjpura, Karnal and Kaithal. All of it yielded 3,600,000 rupees annually. He appointed Baj Singh as the new Governor of Sirhind and Ali Singh of Salaudi as his deputy, and struck coins. Fateh Singh was made Governor of Samana, and Ram Singh Governor of Thanesar.

Banda Singh had become well known at this time as, "The defender of the faith and the champion of the oppressed."

=== Military invasions ===
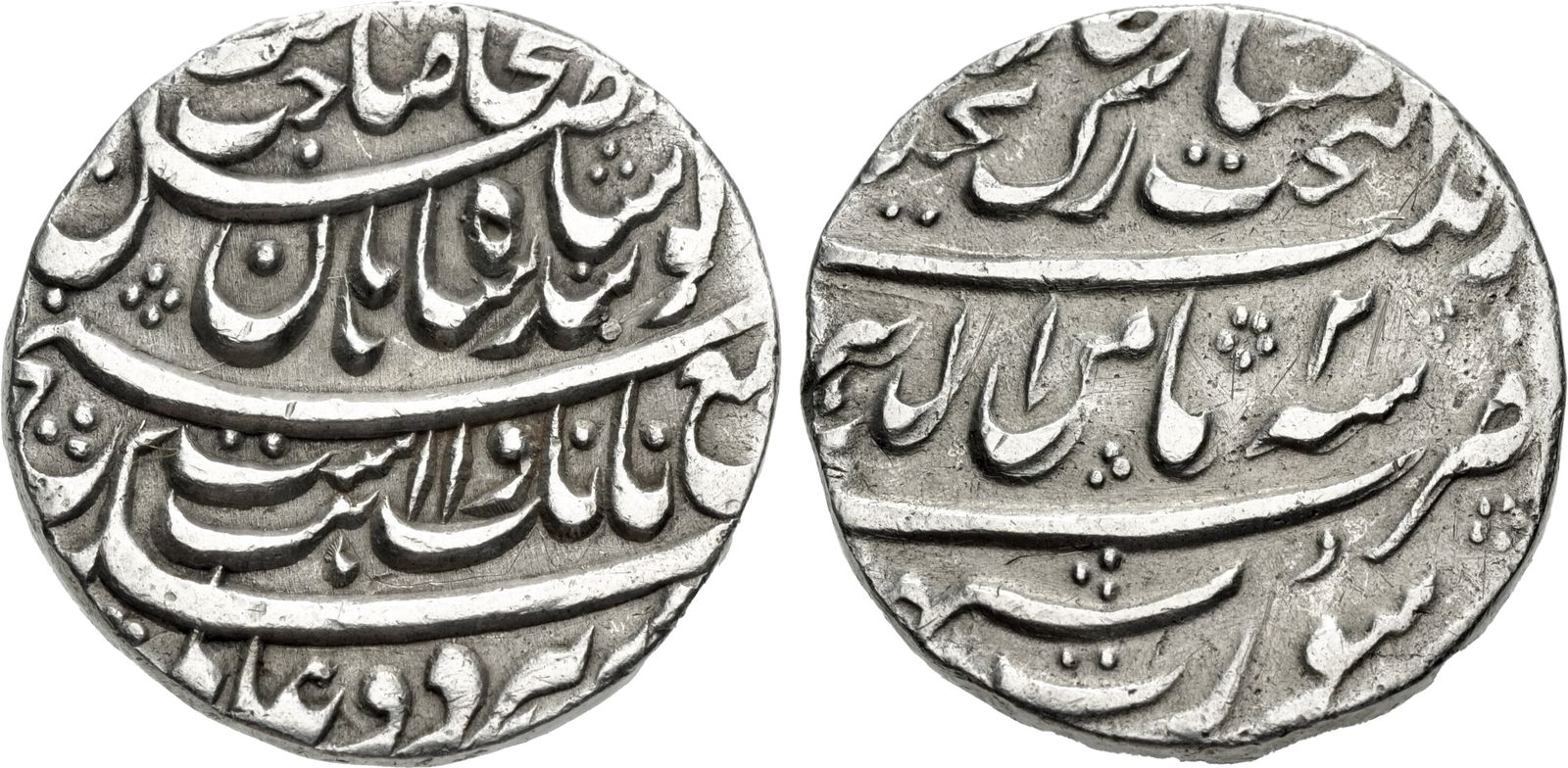
INDIA, Independent States. Sikhs (Khalsa Fauj). Baba Banda Singh Bahadur. 1670-1716. AR Rupee (25mm, 11.98 g, 6h). Amritsar mint. Dated Year 2 (AD 1711)

Banda Singh Bahadur developed the village of Mukhlisgarh and made it his capital. He then renamed it to Lohgarh (Fortress of Iron) where he issued his own mint. The coin described Lohgarh: "Struck in the City of Peace, illustrating the beauty of civic life, and the ornament of the blessed throne".

He briefly established a state in Punjab for half a year. Banda Singh sent Sikhs to Uttar Pradesh and the Sikhs took over Saharanpur, Muzaffarnagar, and other nearby areas.

The rule of the Sikhs over the entire Punjab east of Lahore obstructed the communication between Delhi and Lahore, the capital of Punjab, and this worried Mughal Emperor Bahadur Shah I He gave up his plan to subdue rebels in Rajputana and marched towards Punjab.

The entire imperial force was organized to defeat and kill Banda Singh Bahadur. All the generals were directed to join the Emperor's army. To ensure that there were no Sikh agents in the army camps, an order was issued on 29 August 1710 to all Hindus to shave off their beards.

Banda Singh was in Uttar Pradesh when the Mughal Army under the orders of Munim Khan marched to Sirhind and before the return of Banda Singh, they had already taken Sirhind and the areas around it. The Sikhs therefore moved to Lohgarh for their final battle. The Sikhs defeated the army but reinforcements were called and they laid siege on the fort with 60,000 troops. Gulab Singh dressed himself in the garments of Banda Singh and seated himself in his place.

Banda Singh left the fort at night and went to a secret place in the hills and Chamba forests. The failure of the army to kill or catch Banda Singh shocked Emperor Bahadur Shah I and on 10 December 1710 he ordered that wherever a Sikh was found, he should be killed.

Banda Singh Bahadur wrote Hukamnamas to the Sikhs to reorganize and join him at once. In 1712, the Sikhs gathered near Kiratpur Sahib and defeated Raja Ajmer Chand, who was responsible for organizing all the Hill States against Guru Gobind Singh and instigating battles with him. After Bhim Chand's dead the other Hill Rajas accepted their subordinate status and paid revenues to Banda Singh. While Bahadur Shah I's four sons were killing themselves for the throne of the Mughal Emperor, Banda Singh Bahadur recaptured Sadhaura and Lohgarh. Farrukh Siyar, the 10th Mughal Emperor, appointed Abdus Samad Khan as the Subahdar of the Lahore province and Zakariya Khan, Abdus Samad Khan's son, the Faujdar of Jammu.

In 1713 the Sikhs left Lohgarh and Sadhaura and went to the remote hills of Jammu and where they built Dera Baba Banda Singh. During this time Sikhs were being persecuted especially by Mughals in the Gurdaspur region. Banda Singh came out and captured Kalanaur and Batala (both places in modern Gurdaspur district which rebuked Farrukh Siyar to issue Mughal and Hindu officials and chiefs to proceed with their troops to Lahore to reinforce his army.

== Siege in Gurdas Nangal ==
In March 1715, the army under the command of Abd al-Samad Khan, the Mughal Governor of Lahore, drove Banda Bahadur and the Sikh forces into the village of Gurdas Nangal, 6 km to the west of Gurdaspur, Punjab and laid siege to the village. The Sikhs defended the small fort for eight months under conditions of great hardship, but on 7 December 1715 the Mughals broke into the starving garrison and captured Banda Singh and his companions.

== Execution ==
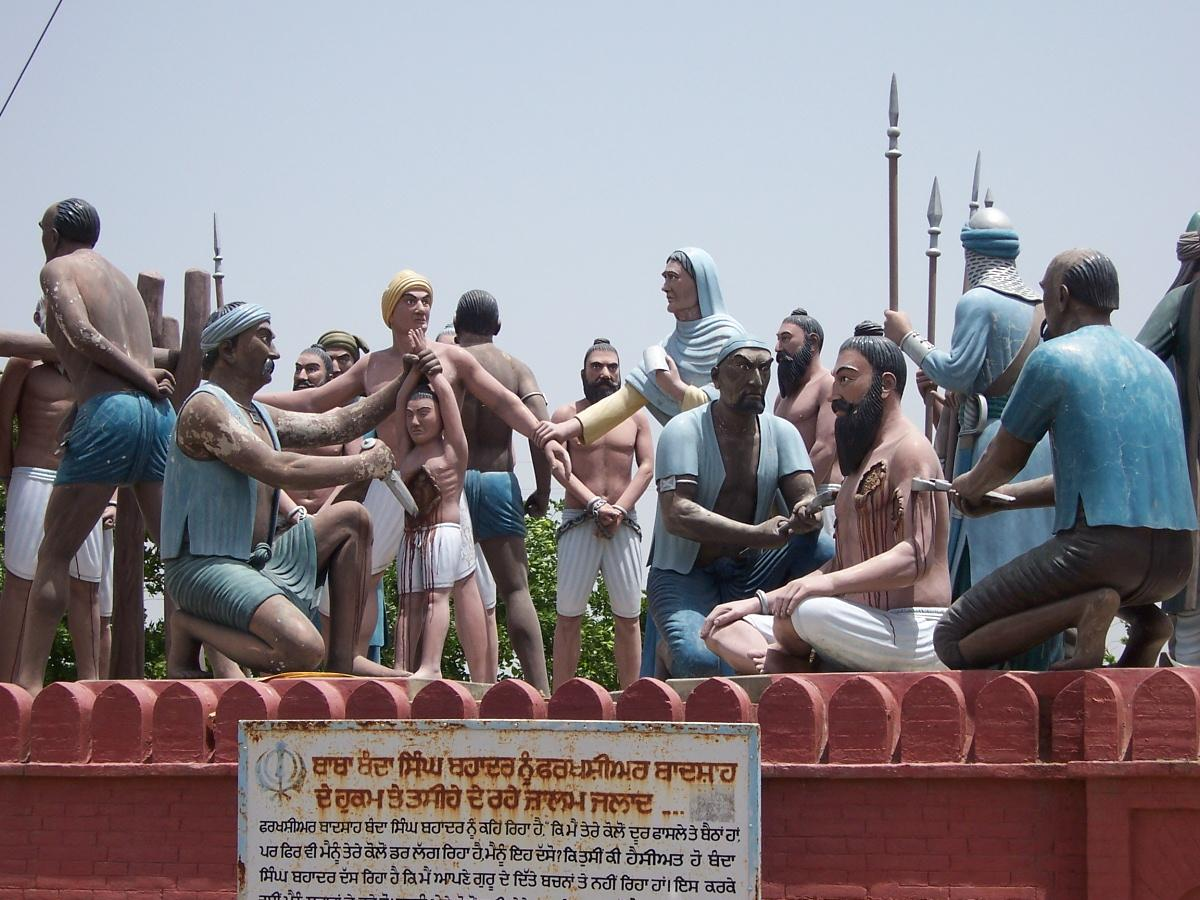
Sculpture of the execution of Banda Singh Bahadur at Delhi, Mehdiana Sahib, near Jagraon in Ludhiana district, India

Banda Singh Bahadur was put into an iron cage and the remaining Sikhs were chained. The Sikhs were brought to Delhi in a procession with the 780 Sikh prisoners, 2,000 Sikh heads hung on spears, and 700 cartloads of heads of slaughtered Sikhs used to terrorize the population. They were put in the Red Fort and pressured to give up their faith and become Muslims.

The prisoners remained unmoved. On their firm refusal these non-converters were ordered to be executed. Every day 100 Sikh soldiers were brought out of the fort and executed in public. This continued for approximately seven days. Banda was told to kill his four-year-old son, Ajai Singh, which he refused to do. So, Ajai was executed, his heart was cut out, and thrust into Banda's mouth. However, his resolution did not break under torture, and so he was martyred. After three months of confinement, on 9 June 1716, Banda's eyes were gouged out, his limbs were severed, his skin removed, and then he was beheaded.

The execution of Banda Singh Bahadur and 700 of his followers by the Mughals in the spring of 1716 at Delhi was observed by a European visitor to the city on official business who was a British East India Company diplomat to the Mughal Empire. This European recorded his thoughts on the execution of the Sikhs in a letter he sent to the Governor of Fort William in Calcutta. It is one of the earliest accounts of the Sikhs from the perspective of a Westerner.

== Revolutionary ==
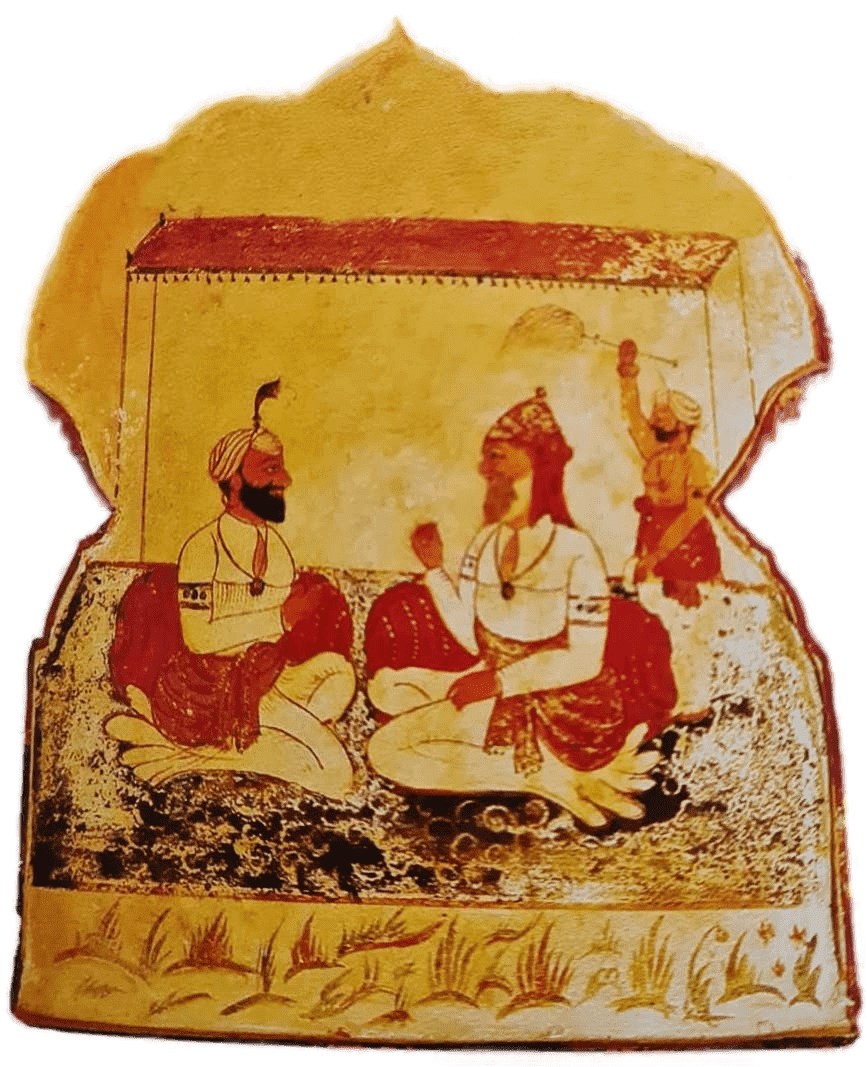
Mural fresco of Banda Singh Bahadur (seated right) with his son (seated left). An attendant to the right is waving a fly-whisk. They are adorned with red clothing colours, characteristic of the Bandai Khalsa faction

Banda Singh Bahadur is known to have halted the Zamindari and Taluqdari system in the time he was active and gave the peasants proprietorship of their own land. It seems that all classes of government officers were addicted to extortion and corruption and the whole system of regulatory and order was subverted.

Local tradition recalls that the people from the neighborhood of Sadaura came to Banda Singh complaining of the iniquities practices by their feudal lords. Banda Singh ordered Baj Singh to open fire on them. The people were astonished at the strange reply to their representation and asked him what he meant. He told them that they deserved no better treatment when being thousands in number they still allowed themselves to be cowed down by a handful of Zamindars. He defeated the Sayyids and Shaikhs in the Battle of Sadhaura.

== Possible rivalry with Tat Khalsa and legacy ==
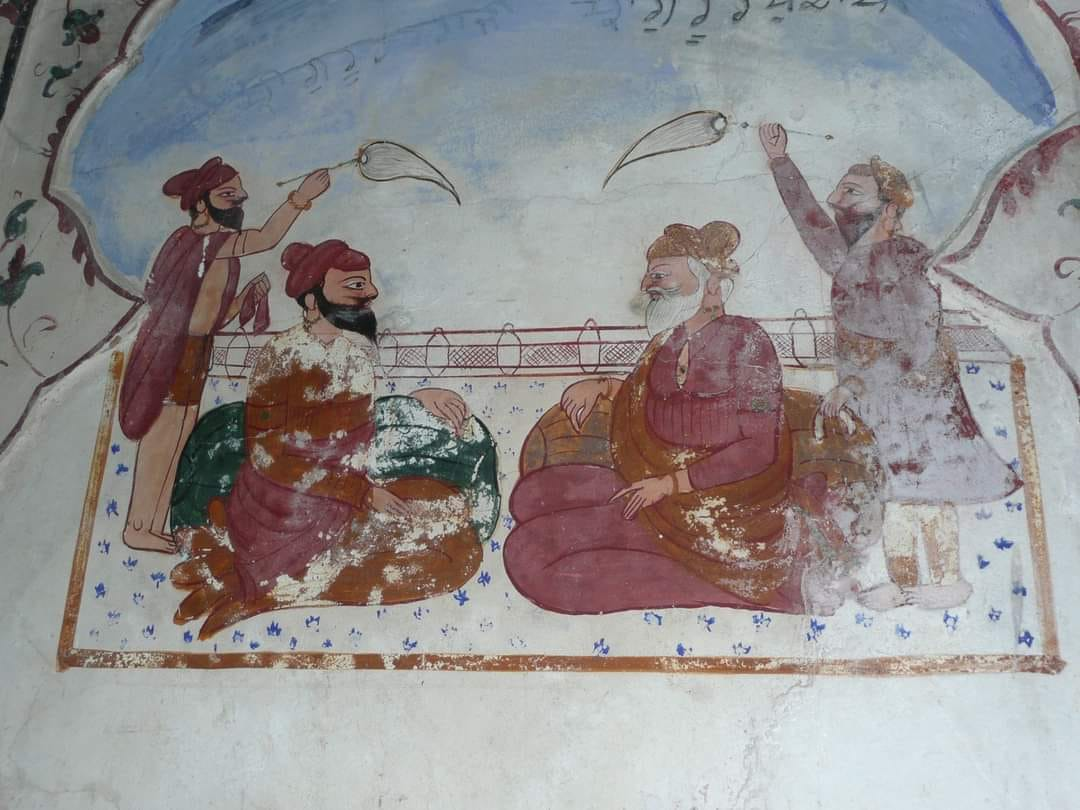
Mural of Banda Singh Bahadur with his son with both being served by fly-whisk attendants

In 1714, a resolute effort was envisaged by Farrukh Siyar to suppress Banda's rebellion, who was evading capture despite significant Mughal endeavors and investment of resources. At first, Mata Sundari (Guru Gobind's widow) was asked to persuade Banda to stop his lawlessness and expedition against the Mughals in exchange for jagirs and recruitment for Sikh soldiers into the imperial army. Banda declined on account of his lack of trust in the government. The Emperor had then imprisoned both of Gobind's widows, prompting Sundari to write to Banda again to get him to submit. Banda had again declined, leading the Emperor to tighten the restrictions on the widows, culminating in the excommunication of Banda Singh Bahadur by Mata Sundari for refusing to submit to the Emperor as per her demands. She further accused him of reigning over the Sikhs as their "Guru", and reprimanded his followers in a hukam-nama. This dispute led to two separate factions of the contemporary Sikh community, the Tat Khalsa; who were allied to Mata Sundari, and the Bandais; who were allied to Banda Singh Bahadur. Mata Sundari's intervention led to half of Banda's followers (approximately fifteen thousand) abandoning him prior to the siege of Gurdas Nangal. Disputes between the Tat Khalsa and the Bandais primarily included topics including Banda's abandonment of the traditional blue robes in favor of red ones, his insistence on vegetarianism, his observance of caste rituals, and his replacement of the prescribed Sikh slogan with "Fateh Darshan", as well as concerns over excesses committed by Banda's troops during their campaign of retribution against the Mughals. Banda's excommunication impeded his ability to counter the Mughals and contributed to his eventual capture and execution.

Modern Sikh tradition speaks of at least two different Khalsas; the Tat Khalsa adhering to the polity and injunctions of Guru Gobind Singh, and the Bandais; those who adopted the principles of Banda Singh Bahadur.

However the authenticity of the excommunication of Banda Singh Bahadur by Mata Sundari has been questioned by historian Ganda Singh who mentions that there is no contemporary or near contemporary writers or sources that make any mention of Banda Singh Bahadur being excommunicated, or that Farrukh Siyar had come into negotiations with Mata Sundari. Historian Surjit Singh Gandhi also claims that there is no contemporary sources that make any mention of an excommunication occurring between Banda Singh and Mata Sundari. Historian Sukhdial Singh further notes that there is no hukam-nama issued by Mata Sundari that addresses Banda Singh. According to Dr. Nazer Singh, Banda Singh was regarded with contempt by the Akalis and the larger Sikh community for two centuries after his death, to counter Banda's exclusion from the Sikh community, Dr. Ganda Singh wrote an exculpatory book on him in 1935, proclaiming him to be a "perfect Sikh". However although Ganda Singh defends Banda Singh from the various allegations levied against him, he does however acknowledge that Banda Singh was not beyond criticism nor was he infallible. Purnima Dhavan has also cast doubt on Ganda Singh's explication of Banda Singh Bahadur's life and adherence to the Khalsa doctrine; his citing of Banda's phrases in hukam-namas, which he interpreted as Banda deferring to the Guru's authority and strictures ("This is the order of the Sacha Sahiba" and "He who lives according to the Rehat of the Khalsa shall be saved by the Guru") were equivocal and could also be taken as Banda conferring guruship upon himself. However Hari Ram Gupta notes that the term "Sri Sacha Sahiba" found in Banda Singh's writings was used to only refer to God and the Guru and not himself. Ganda Singh also concurred that Banda invented his own salutation and prohibited the consumption of meat, likely motivated by his Bairagi background as opposed to the customs of the Khalsa. Harbans Sagoo notes that although Banda Singh introduced the slogan of "Fateh Darshan", he never intended it to replace the traditional Sikh salutation of "Waheguru Ji Ki Ka Khalsa, Waheguru Ji Ki Fateh". When the Khalsa rejected Fateh Darshan as a slogan, Banda Singh agreed to abandon it. Sukhdial Singh claims the slogan was not Fateh Darshan but rather "Fateh Darshani" meaning a fateh which uttered after a darshan. Sukhdial Singh claims that the slogan alone wouldn't have warranted any form of punishment. According to Purnima Dhavan, while Banda did reiterate support of the Khalsa rahit in his hukam-namas, he also revered the values of vegetarianism and customs associated with the Hindu elite, made appeals to a collective Hindu and Sikh religion, and omitted prior orthodox Sikh sentiments and apprehensions about the Khalsa's interactions with other groups.

== Baba Banda Singh Bahadur War Memorial ==
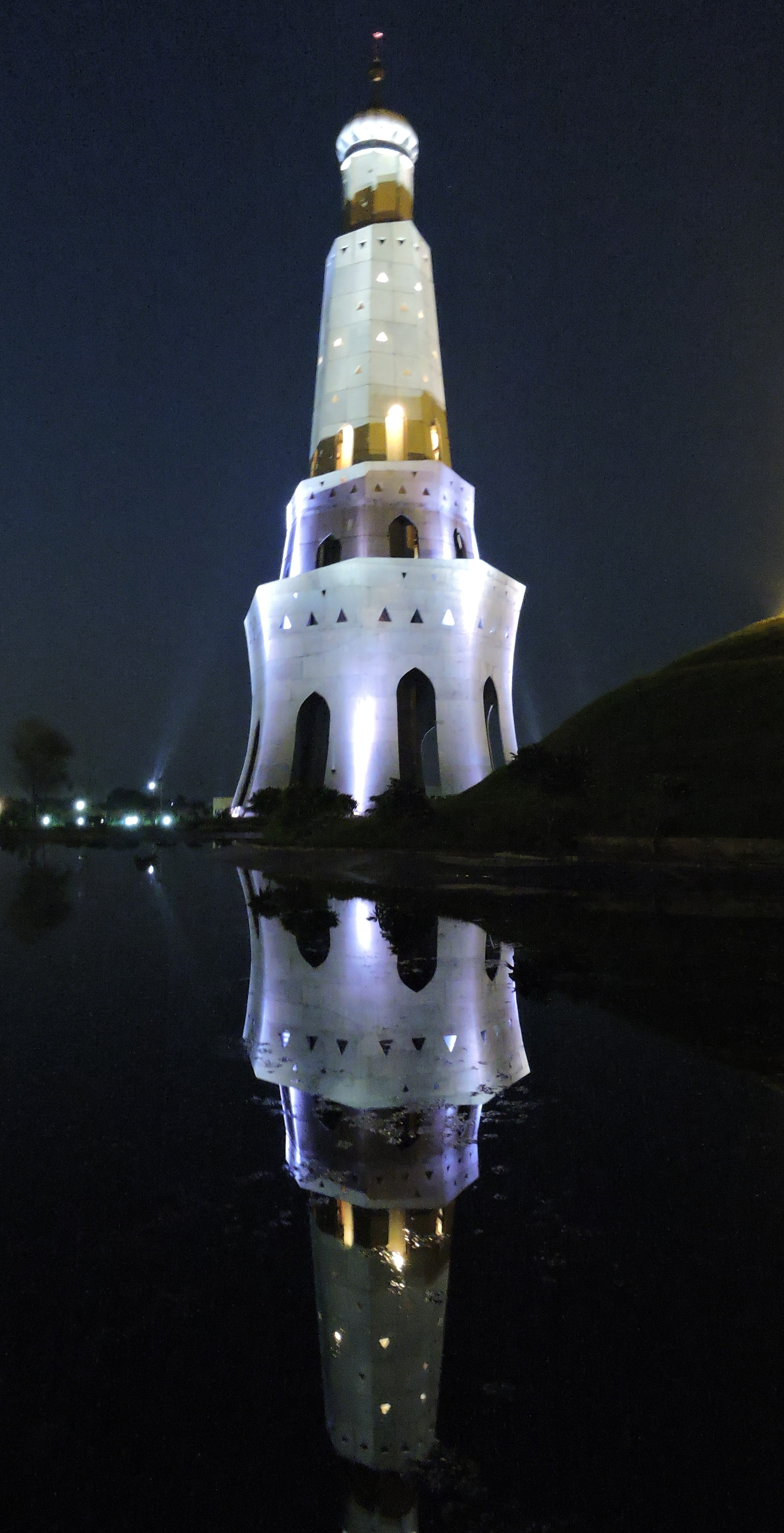
Night view of Fateh Burj, Chappar Chiri, Sahibzada Ajit Singh Nagar, Punjab, India.

A war memorial was built where Battle of Chappar Chiri was fought, to glorify heroic Sikh soldiers. The 328 feet tall Fateh Burj was dedicated to Banda Singh Bahadur who led the army and defeated the Mughal forces. The Fateh Burj is taller than Qutab Minar and is an octagonal structure. There is a dome at the top of the tower with Khanda made of stainless steel.

== In popular culture ==
- Sarbans Dani Guru Gobind Singh, a 1998 Indian Punjabi-language drama film directed by Ram Maheshwari. The film follows the Guru and Banda Singh Bahadur's struggle against the Mughal Empire.
- Rise of Khalsa, a 2006 Indian animated historical drama film by Vismaad Mediatech.
- Chaar Sahibzaade: Rise of Banda Singh Bahadur, a 2016 Indian computer-animated film by Harry Baweja. A sequel to Chaar Sahibzaade, it follows Banda Singh Bahadur's fight against the Mughals under the guidance of Guru Gobind Singh.
- Guru Da Banda, a 2018 Indian animated historical drama film by Jassi Chana.

== Battle record ==
Outcome	Date	Campaign	Action	Opponent/s	Location	Sources
Victory	Late 1709	Campaign to Sirhind	Skirmish in Narnaul	Local dacoities and thieves	Narnaul, Haryana	
Victory	Late 1709	Campaign to Sirhind	Battle of Bhiwani	Mughal Empire	Bhiwani, Haryana	
Victory	October 1709	Campaign to Sirhind	Skirmish in Bangardesh	Local dacoities and thieves	Bangardesh, Haryana	
Victory	November 1709	Campaign to Sirhind	Battle of Sonipat	Mughal Empire	Sonipat, Haryana	
Victory	November 1709	Campaign to Sirhind	Battle of Kaithal	Mughal Empire	Kaithal, Haryana	
Victory	28 November 1709	Campaign to Sirhind	Battle of Samana	Mughal Empire	Samana, Punjab	
Victory	December 1709	Campaign to the East	Battle of Ghuram	Mughal Empire	Sanaur, Punjab	
Victory	December 1709	Campaign to the East	Battle of Thaska	Mughal Empire	Thaska, Punjab	
Victory	December 1709	Campaign to the East	Battle of Thanesar	Mughal Empire	Thanesar, Haryana	
Victory	December 1709	Campaign to the East	Battle of Shahbad	Mughal Empire	Shahbad-Markanda, Haryana	
Victory	December 1709	Campaign to the East	Battle of Damala	Mughal Empire	Damala, Haryana	
Victory	December 1709	Campaign to the East	Battle of Mustafabad	Mughal Empire	Mustafabad, Haryana	
Victory	December 1709	Campaign to the East	Battle of Kunjpura	Mughal Empire	Kunjpura, Haryana	
Victory	December 1709	Campaign to the East	Battle of Kapuri	Mughal Empire	Kapuri, Punjab	
Victory	Early 1710	Campaign to the East	Battle of Sadaura	Mughal Empire	Sadaura, Haryana	
Victory	Early 1710	Campaign to the East	Battle of Ropar	Mughal Empire	Ropar, Punjab	
Victory	May 12, 1710	Campaign to Sirhind	Battle of Chappar Chiri	Mughal Empire	Chappar Chiri, Punjab	
Victory	May 12–14, 1710	Campaign to Sirhind	Siege of Sirhind	Mughal Empire	Sirhind, Punjab	
Victory	June 1710	N/A	Battle of Ghurnai	Ramraiya	Ghurnai, Punjab	
Victory	June 1710	Campaign in the Yamuna-Ganga Doaba	Battle of Saharanpur	Mughal Empire	Saharanpur, Uttar Pradesh	
Victory	June 1710	Campaign in the Yamuna-Ganga Doaba	Battle of Behut	Mughal Empire	Behat, Uttar Pradesh	
Victory	July 11, 1710	Campaign in the Yamuna-Ganga Doaba	Battle of Nanauta	Mughal Empire	Nanauta, Uttar Pradesh	
Victory	July 1710	Campaign in the Yamuna-Ganga Doaba	Battle of Jalalabad	Mughal Empire	Jalalabad, Uttar Pradesh	
Loss	July–August 1710	Campaign in the Yamuna-Ganga Doaba	Siege of Jalalabad	Mughal Empire	Jalalabad, Uttar Pradesh	
Loss	December 1710	N/A	First Battle of Lohgarh	Mughal Empire	Lohgarh, Haryana	
Victory	Early 1711	Campaign against the Hill States	Battle of Bilaspur	Kahlur	Kahlur Fort	
Victory	Early 1711	Campaign from the Hills	Battle of Pathankot	Mughal Empire	Pathankot, Punjab	
Victory	Early 1711	Campaign from the Hills	Battle of Gurdaspur	Mughal Empire	Gurdaspur, Punjab	
Victory	Early 1711	Campaign from the Hills	Battle of Raipur-Brahmpur	Mughal Empire	Raipur-Brahmpur, Punjab	
Victory	March- April 1711	Campaign from the Hills	Battle of Batala	Mughal Empire	Batala, Punjab	
Victory	March- April 1711	Campaign from the Hills	Battle of Kalanaur	Mughal Empire	Kalanaur, Punjab	
Victory	March- April 1711	Campaign from the Hills	Battle of Achal	Mughal Empire	Achal, Punjab	
Loss	May 1711	Campaign from the Hills	Battle of Pasrur	Mughal Empire	Pasrur, Punjab	
Victory	December 1711	Campaign from the Hills	Battle of Kiratpur	Mughal Empire	Kiratpur, Punjab	
Victory	March 1712	Campaign from the Hills	Second Battle of Sirhind	Mughal Empire	Sirhind, Punjab	
Victory	March 1712	N/A	Second Battle of Lohgarh	Mughal Empire	Lohgarh, Haryana	
Loss	April–December 1715	N/A	Siege of Gurdaspur	Mughal Empire	Gurdaspur, Punjab	

== Gallery ==
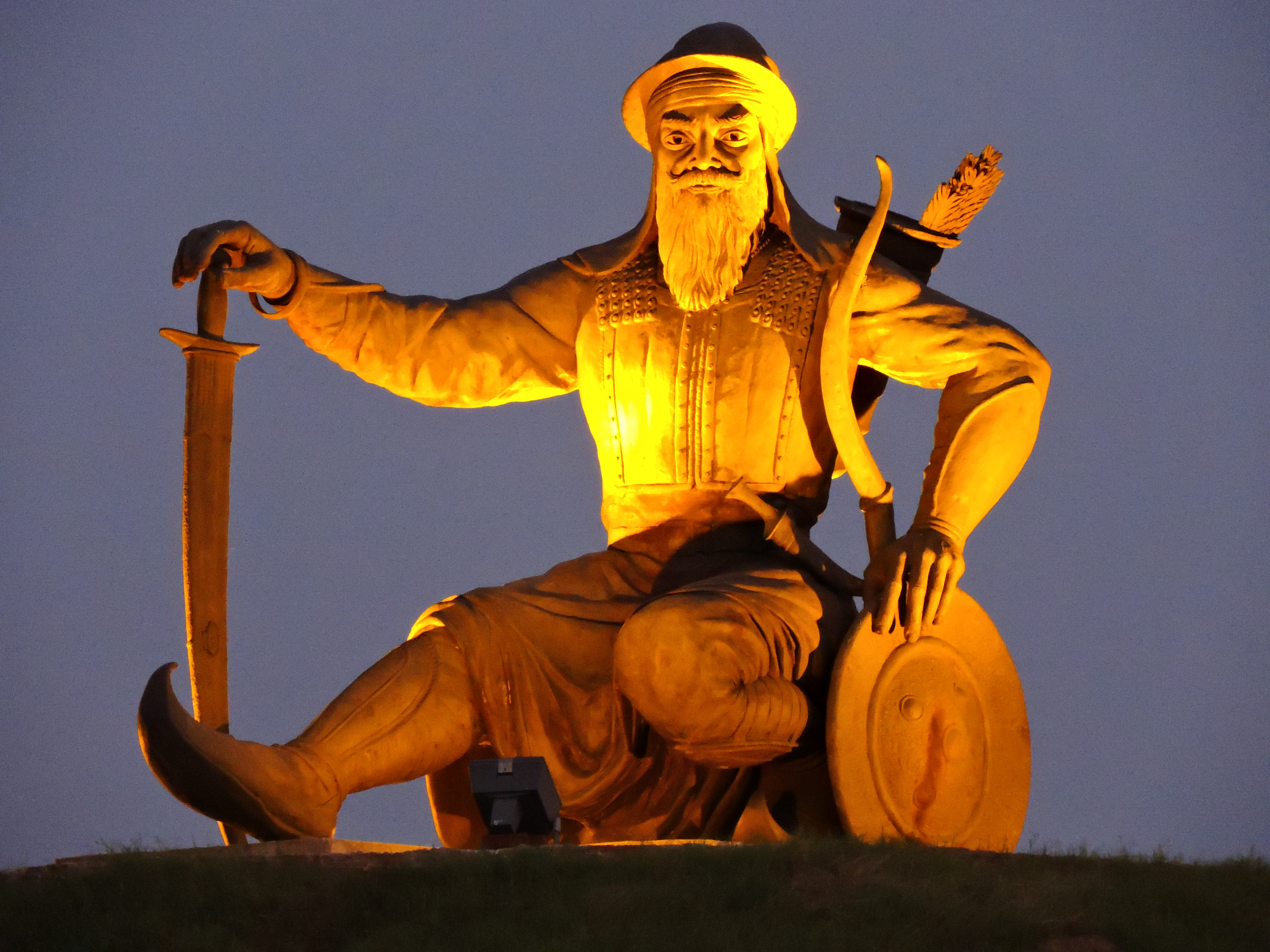
Statue of Baba Banda Bahadur at Chappar Chiri, near Mohali (Punjab)

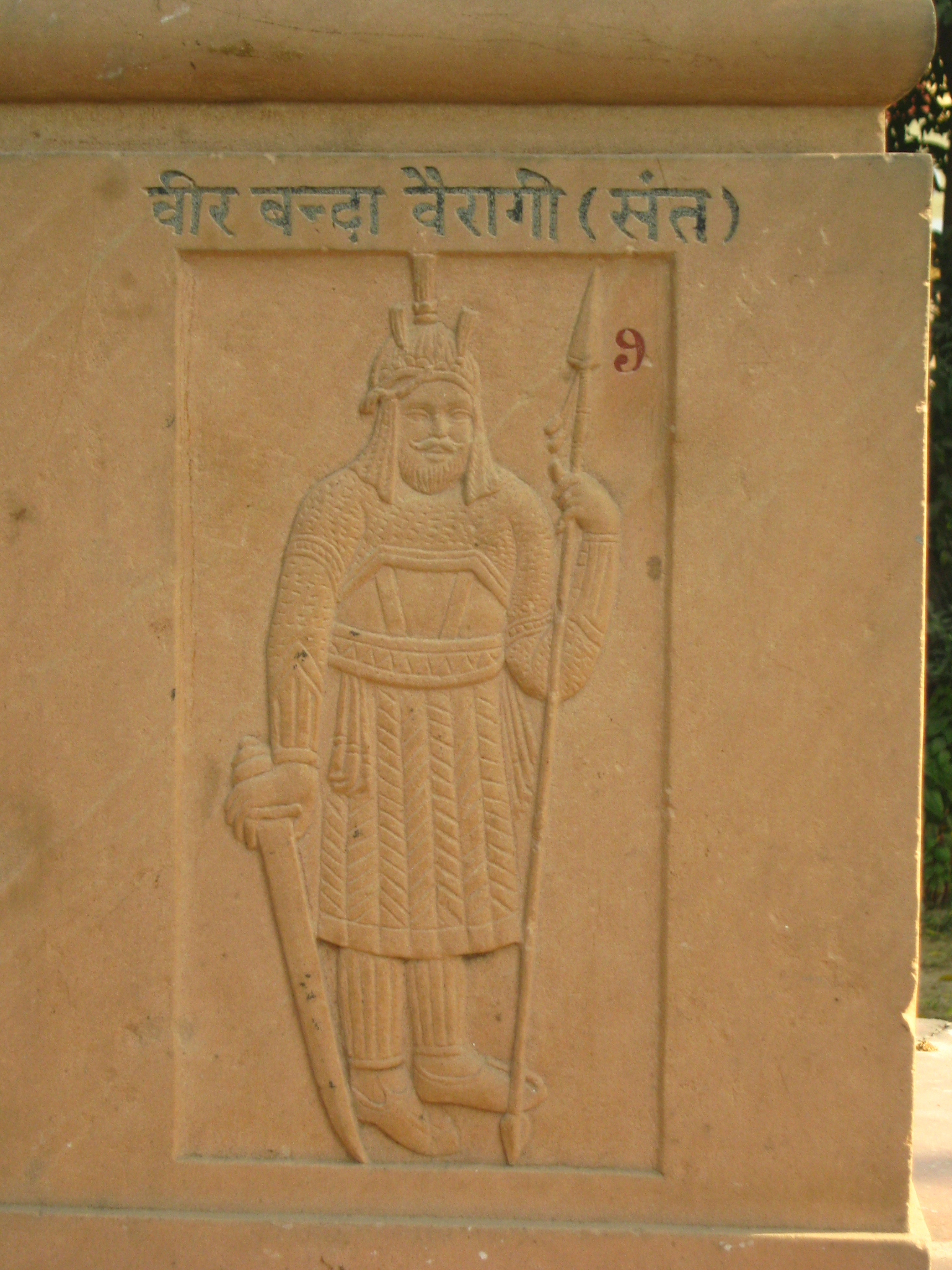
Statue of Veer Banda Bairagi in Birla Mandir Delhi

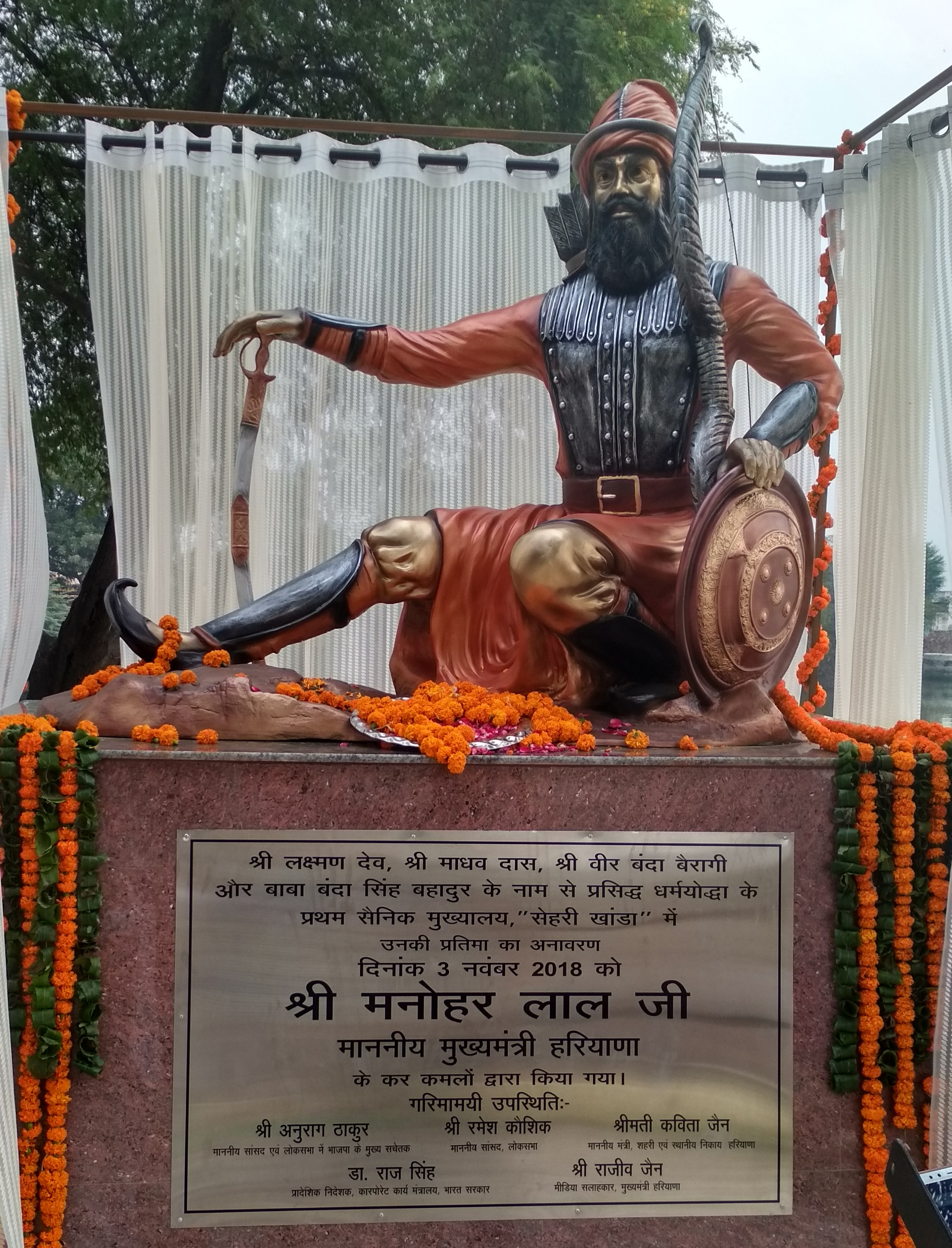
Banda Bairagi Memorial in Khanda, near Sonipat, Haryana

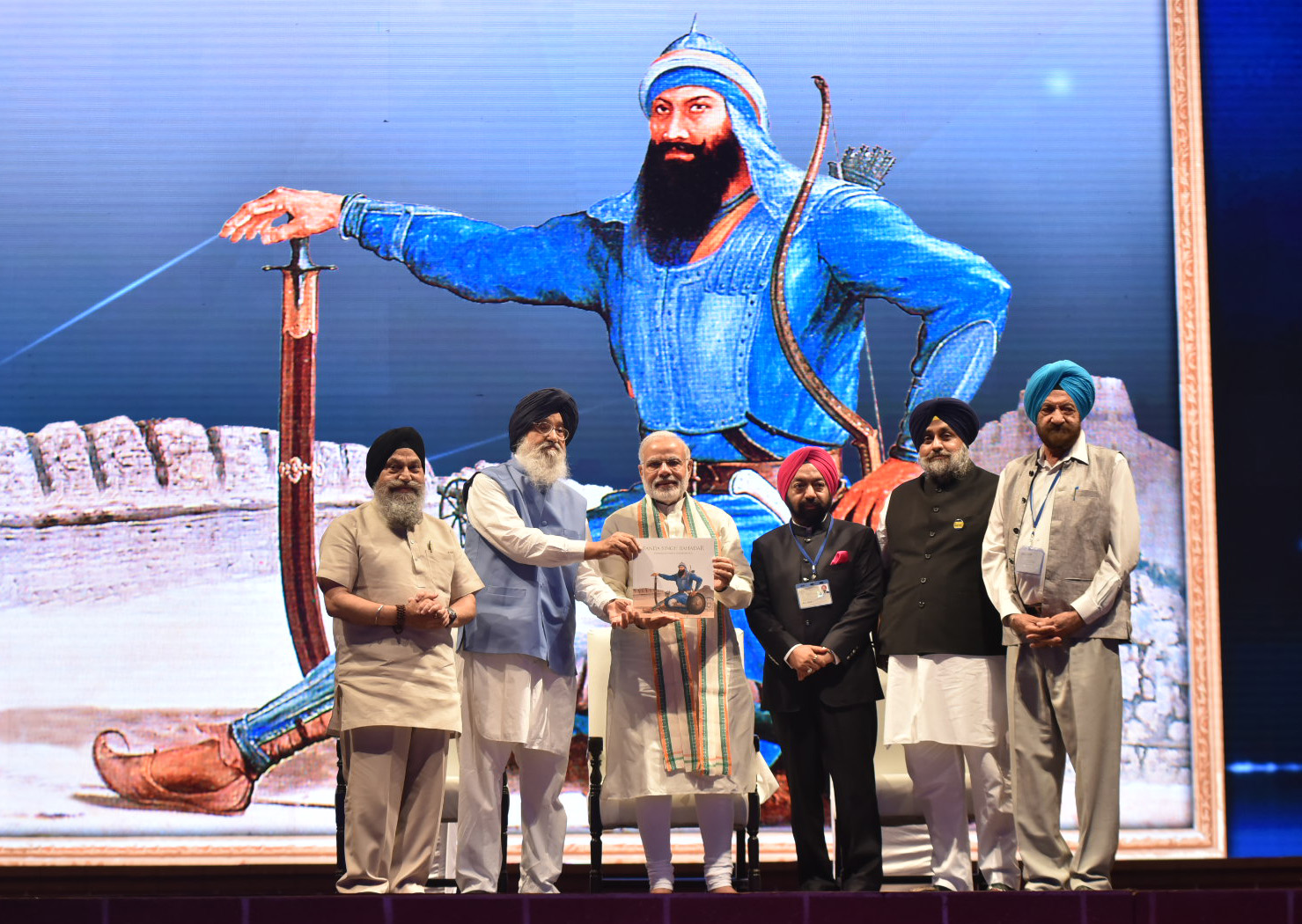
Indian Prime Minister Narendra Modi and Indian Punjab Chief Minister Parkash Singh Badal at the commemorative event to mark the 300th anniversary of the martyrdom of Baba Banda Singh Bahadur.

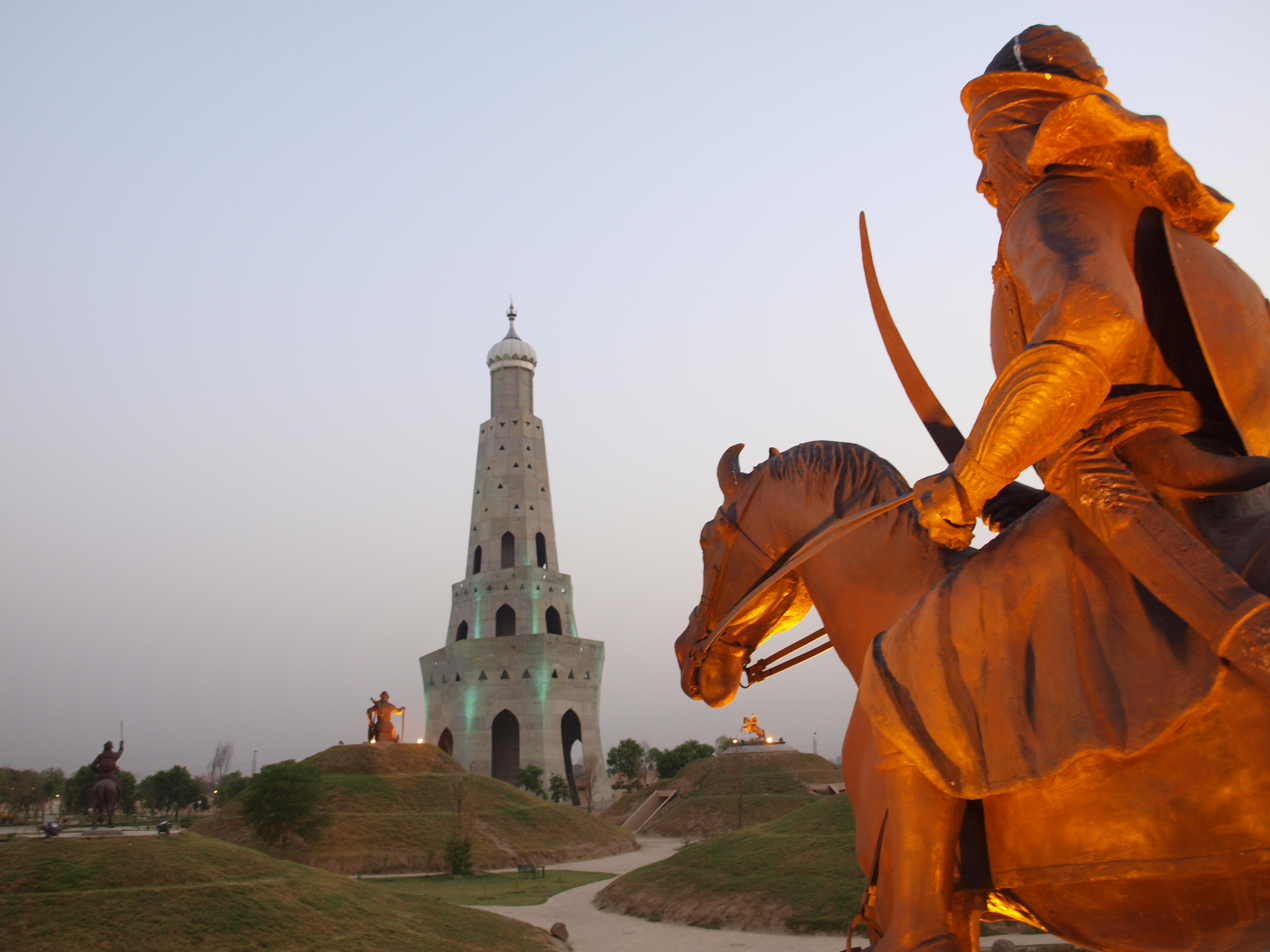
Shaheed Baba Banda Singh Bahadur memorial at Chhapar Chiri, near Mohali

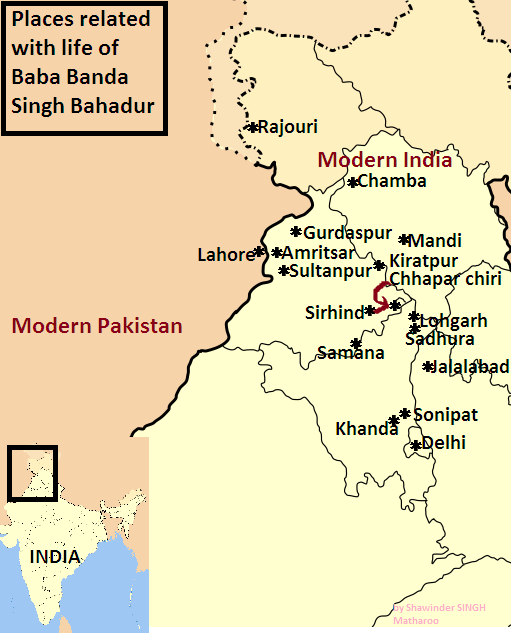
Places related with life of Baba Banda Singh Bahadur

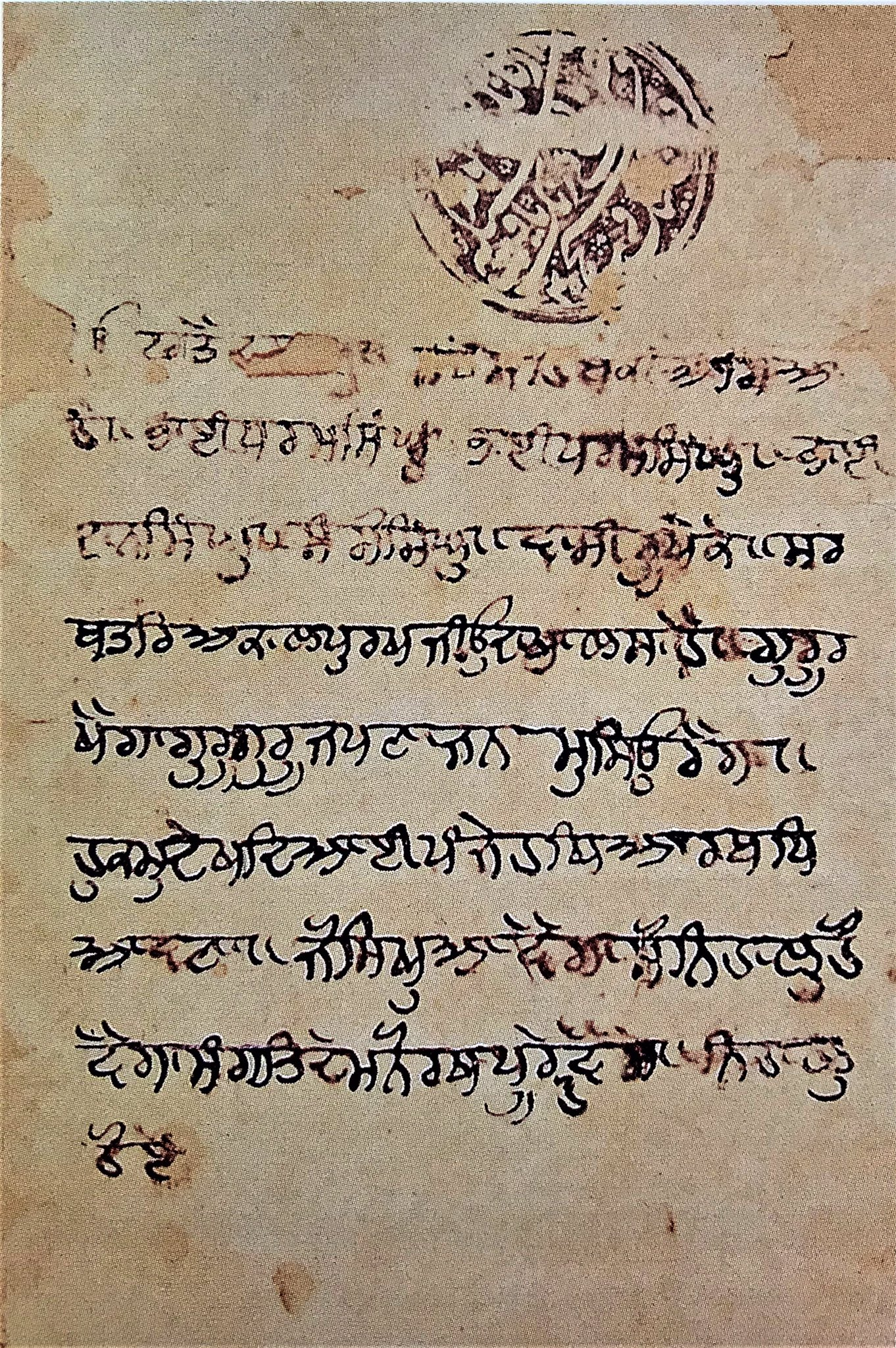
Issued edict (hukamnama) of Banda Singh Bahadur. Held in the Bhai Rupa Collection

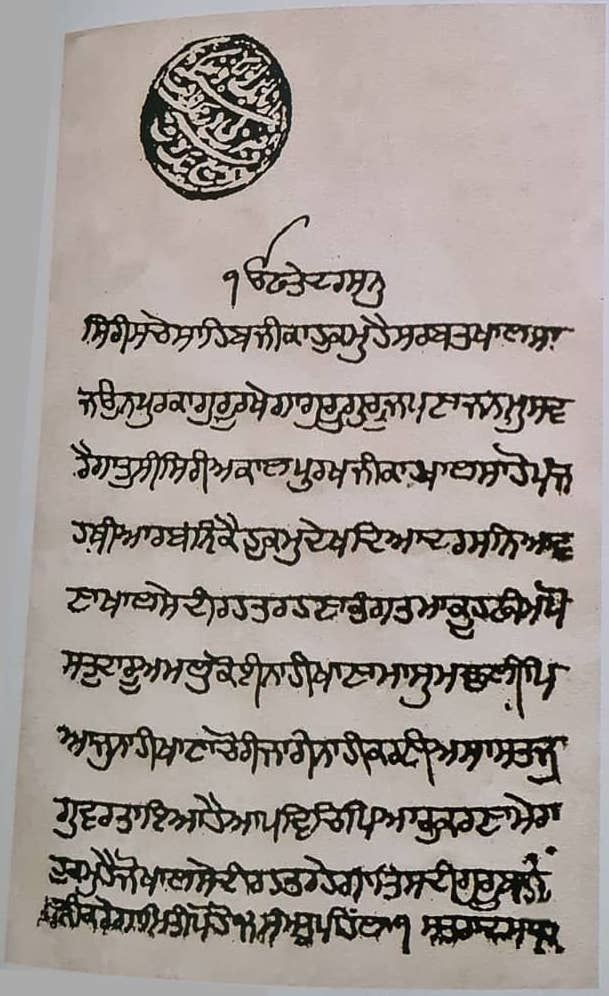
Issued edict (hukamnama) of Banda Singh Bahadur containing his official seal at top of page

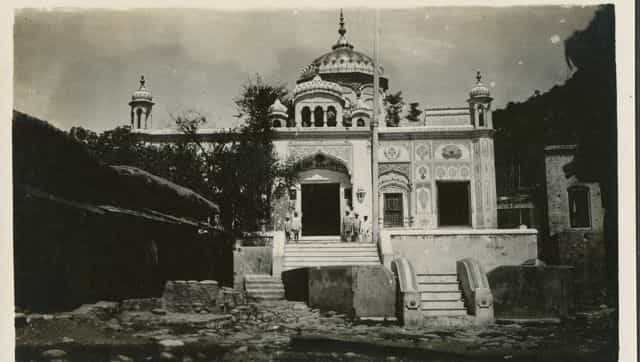
'Pind Dehra Sahibji', dedicated to Banda Singh Bahadur, in September 1932

== See also ==
- Jassa Singh Ahluwalia
- Dal Khalsa
- Jassa Singh Ramgarhia
- Bhai Mani Singh
- Nawab Kapur Singh
