= Battle of Thanesar =

Battle of Thanesar may refer to these battles fought in Thanesar, India:

- Battle of Thanesar (1567)
- Battle of Thanesar (1710)
