= Kalanpur =

- Interactive map of Kalanpur
- Coordinates: 30°9′44″N 77°11′2″E

Kalanpur is a small village in Yamunanagar district in the Indian state of Haryana and it is 6 km from Mustafabad.

Other villages near Kalanpur are Kanhari Kalan, Darajpur, Tehi, and Sialba. As of the 2011 Indiam census, Kalanpur had a population of 1032.
