= First Battle of Lohgarh =

1710 battle of the Mughal–Sikh Wars

- Part of the Mughal–Sikh wars
Date	December 1710
Location	Lohgarh, Bilaspur
Result	Mughal victory: Mughals capture Lohgarh after a long siege; Banda Singh Bahadur escapes the battlefield

Belligerents
Khalsa	Mughal Empire: Rohillas; Balochs; Jats; Bundelkhand

Commanders and leaders
Banda Singh Bahadur	Bahadur Shah: Rafi-us-Shan; Kanwar Khan; Munim Khan II; Udet Singh Bundela; Mahabat Khan; Khan Zaman; Chatarsal Bundela; Islam Khan Mir Atish; Hamid-ud-din; Churaman Jat; Azim-us-Shan; Jahan Shah; Mir Mubarak Allah Iradat Khan

Strength
2,000–3,000 cavalry	60,000 cavalry

The First Battle of Lohgarh was fought between the Sikhs, and the Mughal Empire in 1710. The Mughal emperor Bahadur Shah's army moved towards Lohgarh, Bilaspur where they engaged with the Sikhs to capture the fort on 16 December 1710. The battle is noted for its use of guerrilla tactics and being a pitched battle.

== Background ==
In January 1709, after defeating and killing his only surviving brother, Kam Bakhsh, Emperor Bahadur Shah dedicated about a year in the Deccan to organize his rule. However, as several Rajput princes rebelled in Rajasthan, he moved there in May 1710. While stationed in Ajmer, news of an uprising by the Sikhs in the Punjab reached him, compelling him to swiftly settle disputes with the Rajputs and set off for the Punjab by late June.

His march was bolstered by prominent Hindu chiefs like Chatarsal Bundela and Udet Singh Bundela, while governors from regions such as Allahabad, Lucknow, Moradabad, Delhi, and even Sayyid Abdullah of Barah Sadat in Muzaffarnagar were instructed to join his forces. In July, he appointed Zain-ud-din Ahmad Khan as Governor of Sarhind, but by August, Firoz Khan Mewati was entrusted with leading the advance guard. Soon, Muhammad Amin Khan, the Governor of Moradabad, and his son Qamar-ud-din Khan (both future prime ministers of Delhi) reinforced the emperor’s ranks in Haryana, while another contingent under Sayyid Wajih-ud-din Khan from Barah Sadat bolstered Firoz Khan’s forces. With a decree barring any movement in or out of Delhi, and with Kokaltash Khan taking charge of Sonipat, the camp even had all its Hindu members shave their heads in early September to eliminate any resemblance to the Sikhs.

As more Muslim chiefs and jagirdars joined along the way, with Churaman Jat of Bharatpur reporting for duty near Delhi, the emperor, anxious over the mounting threats, bypassed his capital and marched directly to Sonipat in late October. There he learned of engagements with the Sikhs: Firoz Khan Mewati had clashed with Binod Singh at Amin, north of Kamal, and triumphantly presented 300 Sikh heads to the emperor. This victory earned him one lakh rupees and a reassignment as Governor of Sirhind, replacing Zain-ud-din Ahmad Khan. Firoz Khan’s subsequent victories at Taraori and Thanesar, where he subdued Binod Singh and Ram Singh and set up military posts, saw hundreds of Sikh heads displayed along the roads, and he eventually advanced to capture Shahabad. In November, the emperor’s rapid campaign carried him through Panipat, Karnal, Thanesar, and Shahabad before encamping at Barara, covering considerable ground in a month. By early December, he reached Sadhaura, which became his operational base, receiving another set of 300 Sikh heads from Shams Khan of Sarhind and ordering Firoz Khan Mewati to restore imperial authority in the countryside.

Meanwhile, Bahadur Shah prepared an assault on Banda’s stronghold at Lohgarh. Plagued by rumors that Banda wielded supernatural powers—rumored to be capable of diverting bullets, rendering swords ineffective, and promising that fallen warriors would be reborn in higher ranks—the imperial troops were gripped by terror. A formidable force under Rustamdil Khan left Sadhaura to assess Banda’s defenses, only to be ambushed by Sikh fighters nearby. Contemporary accounts describe a chaotic battle in which the Sikhs, clad in the simple attire of ascetics, inflicted severe casualties on the imperial ranks, including the death of a nephew of Firoz Khan Mewati and injury to his son, while Banda’s forces suffered the loss of 1,500 men and two key leaders. Adding to the turmoil, relentless rains and bitter cold over several days caused widespread illness among soldiers and decimated many horses, a misfortune the troops attributed to Banda’s sorcery. In response, a substantial force led by Prince Rafi-us-Shan, the emperor’s son, was dispatched to support Rustamdil Khan. Eyewitnesses later noted that the Sikhs repeatedly emerged from their fortifications to confront the imperial troops, only to be overwhelmed by the resolute Ghazis. For his achievements, Rustamdil Khan was elevated to a rank of 4,000 Zat and 3,000 Sawar and honored with the title Ghazi Khan Rustam-e-Jang.

== Siege ==
Rustamdil Khan advanced further until he reached the Som stream. From this point, he could clearly see the fort of Lohgarh, which dominated the hilltop. A thick, eerie forest lay between the stream and the fort, its nighttime sounds adding to the sense of foreboding. On December 9, 1710, the imperial forces established their camp near this location. The responsibility of protecting the royal encampment was entrusted to Prime Minister Munim Khan and his son, Mahabat Khan.

The very next day, December 10, 1710, a massive army of 60,000 soldiers moved forward in a well-organized formation designed to completely encircle the fort. The right flank was led by Wazir Munim Khan, his son Mahabat Khan, and Chatarsal Bundela, while the left was commanded by Det Singh Bundela and Churaman Jat. Rustamdil Khan took charge of the center. As the Mughal forces approached within the effective range of the Sikh artillery, they were subjected to a relentless barrage of cannon fire. The attackers then managed to enter the fort’s trenches at the base of the hill. Despite the determined efforts of the Sikh defenders, they were overwhelmed and forced to retreat upward. This fierce confrontation resulted in heavy casualties on both sides, including significant losses among Muslim ranks.

Lohgarh itself was a small fort, with limited capacity to store the large amounts of grain and fodder needed for a prolonged defense. With supplies rapidly dwindling, the enemy had even resorted to purchasing extra provisions from local traders and hauling them up the hill with ropes. Confronted with these dire circumstances, Banda decided that escape was the only viable option.

In an intriguing twist, a Sikh by the name of Gulab Singh bore a striking resemblance to Banda Singh Bahadur. Seizing the opportunity, he donned Banda’s clothes and assumed his identity. Then, at about 3 a.m. on December 11, 1710, a large tamarind tree trunk at the lower part of the hill was rigged with gunpowder. At the same time, the fort’s cannons were prepared to fire in unison. As the explosion from the trunk erupted and the cannons discharged, the ensuing chaos allowed Banda and his men to slip away unnoticed, eventually vanishing into the Sarmur hills. From Sarmur, Banda’s route led him across the lower stretches of the Shiwalik hills. His journey took him through several regions—first Hindur (Nalagarh), then Kahlur (Bilaspur), followed by Kutjehr, Jaswan, Siba, and Nurpur—until he finally reached Chamba.

As dawn broke on December 11, 1710, the imperial troops launched a renewed and vigorous attack on the fort. Inside, Gulab Singh and his group continued to fire on the approaching enemy, but the Mughal soldiers kept ascending the hill. In the confusion that followed, Gulab Singh and thirty of his men were captured. Additionally, several women and children from a nearby village, who had sought refuge in the fort, were also taken as prisoners. The spoils recovered from the fort were considerable: the enemy had seized numerous horses and camels, five elephants, three heavy cannons, and seventeen lighter guns, along with various muskets and swords. Among these treasures were also a canopy supported by silver poles, gold and silver coins valued at eight lakhs of rupees, and underground gold coins worth another twenty lakhs of rupees.

== Aftermath ==
The imperial camp initially erupted in celebration over what appeared to be a major victory. On December 12, 1710, a grand durbar was held where many commanders were honored. However, the jubilation quickly turned to dismay when it was revealed that the real Banda had escaped, and the man captured was merely his look-alike, a situation famously summarized by Khafi Khan as "the hawk had flown and an owl had been caught." The revelation cast a pall over the camp, and a somber mood took hold.

The Emperor, displeased by the turn of events, summoned Prime Minister Munim Khan and reprimanded him severely. The rebuke affected Munim Khan deeply; he soon fell ill and died roughly two and a half months later while the Emperor was stationed at Badhauli near Sadhaura on his journey to Lahore. Gulab Singh was confined in an iron cage, transported to Delhi, and imprisoned in the Red Fort. Meanwhile, Gulab Singh’s thirty companions were executed by beheading. Adding to the grim tally, Muhammad Khan arrived from Sarhind bearing six cartloads of severed Sikh heads as a grisly offering to the Emperor.
