= Guru Da Banda =

2018 Indian Punjabi-language animated historical drama film

- Directed by: Jassi Chana
- Written by: Satnam Chana
- Produced by: Joginder Singh Bhangalia and Sonu Bhangalia
- Cinematography: Jassi Chana
- Edited by: Gurpreet Singh
- Music by: Param Aagaaz (Melo Vibes)
- Production company: Pritam Films Production
- Release date: 24 August 2018
- Country: India
- Language: Punjabi

Guru Da Banda is a 2018 Indian Punjabi-language animated historical drama film about Banda Singh Bahadur directed by Jassi Chana. Produced by Joginder Singh Bhangalia and Sonu Bhangalia under the banner Pritam Films Production, the film was released on 24 August 2018.
