= Second Battle of Lohgarh =

1712/13 battle of the Mughal–Sikh Wars

Sieges of Lohgarh and Saudhara (1713)
- Part of Mughal–Sikh Wars
Date	April-October 9, 1713
Location	Lohgarh, Bilaspur
Result	Saudhara: Mughal victory: Capture of Saudhara by the Mughals; Banda Singh flees to Lohgarh; Lohgarh: Sikh retreat: Recapture of Lohgarh by the Mughals; The Sikhs evacuate Lohgarh

Belligerents
Khalsa	Mughal Empire

Commanders and leaders
Banda Singh Bahadur	Abd al-Samad Khan; Zakariya Khan; Zain-ud-din Ahmed Khan; Inam Khan †; Baq Beg Khan †

The Second Siege of Lohgarh, also known as the Second Siege of Lohgarh and Saudhara, was fought in 1713 between Sikh forces led by Banda Singh Bahadur and Mughal forces led by Abd al-Samad Khan, dispatched by the emperor Farrukhsiyar. The siege lasted a grueling 6 months and was costly on both sides, but ultimately the Mughals prevailed and once again, Banda was forced to flee to the hills

== Background ==
After the death of Bahadur Shah I, a civil war occurred between his sons. The eldest son, Jahandar Shah, won and became the emperor with the help of Zulfiqar Khan.

Banda took full advantage of the opportunity and recaptured Sadaura as well as Sarhind. After this, he recaptured Lohgarh, where he remained undisturbed for about two months. The fort of Lohgarh was repaired and strengthened, and it became the capital of the Sikhs for almost two years. Jahandar Shah had ordered Amin Khan to capture Banda Singh Bahadur and lay siege to Lohgarh, but he failed to capture the Sikh leader. Later, as the Emperor went to Agra to deal with Farrukh Siyar’s revolt (Farrukh Siyar being the son of his younger brother, Azim-us-Shan), Amin Khan was called to join him. On February 11, 1713, Jahandar Shah was defeated and killed, and Farrukh Siyar became Emperor. Soon after, Farrukh Siyar focused on ending the Sikh uprising. On February 22, 1713, he moved Abd al-Samad Khan from Kashmir to Punjab, appointed his young son, Zakariya Khan, Governor of Jammu, gave Kashmir to Zabardast Khan, and put Zain-ud-din Ahmad Khan in charge of Sirhind. They were all ordered to stop the Sikh revolt and capture Banda.

== Battle ==
In April 1713, Abd al-Samad Khān and Zain-ud-din Ahmad Khan set up camp at Sadhaura and began fighting the Sikhs. Despite a great deal of effort and investment into the siege, the Sikhs were unwavering and gave the Mughal garrisons a great deal of resistance, partly due to them receiving supplies from the fort of Lohgarh. As a result, it was decided to first disrupt these supplies and capture Saudhara, so then they could make a combined attack on Lohgarh. Luck struck them as in July of 1713, a relief group sent by Banda was interecepted. The resulting battle between the two led to the total annihilation of the Sikhs but also the deaths of Inam Khan and Baq beg Khan. After this skirmish, the morale within the imperial army wavered and Banda, in response, sent even more relief garrisons to attempt ambushes. The imperial army was caught off guard, but managed to repulse these garrisons as well, tightening the siege on Saudhara.

Despite the disparity of the situation, the Sikhs fought very bravely, nearly overpowering the Mughal army with their daring night attacks. The siege persisted for 6 more months where both sides were unable to overcome the other. However, the Sikhs, despite their valiant attempts, were in a losing situation and were facing food shortages. Thus, they decided to evacuate to Lohgarh, which they believed was of a stronger position. The desperate Sikhs broke through the imperial lines and managed to escape, but a great amount were slaughtered by the imperial forces.The Mughals then entered the fort and the news of the fort's capture was reported to Farrukhsiyar, who in return, rewarded Samad Khan with an imperial decree and a special royal robe (Khilat).

Subsequently, they were pursued to Lohgarh but before a fierce battle could commence, the Sikhs quickly evacuated the fort and fled into the hills. The fort was then quickly recaptured by Mughal forces. This series of events was recorded in Delhi on October 9, 1713. Banda then moved to his Derah on the bank of the Chenab River. Later, Zakariya Khan led an expedition against him, which led to an estimated amount of 700-900 Sikhs being killed. On December 13, 1713, these were shown before Emperor Farrukh Siyar, and Zakariya Khan was honored with a robe that gave him the rank of 3,000 Zat and 1,000 Sawars.

== See also ==
- Nihang
- Martyrdom and Sikhism
