= Battle of Bilaspur (1711) =

1711 battle of Banda Singh Bahadur's invasion of the Hill States

Date	Early 1711
Location	Kahlur Fort
Result	Sikh victory

Belligerents
Khalsa	Kahlur; Assisted by: 21 Hill States

Commanders and leaders
Banda Singh Bahadur	Raja Ajmer Chand (surrendered)

Strength
5 accompanied voluntary by a large number of Sikhs	1,300 Mian Rajputs; 7 war elephants

Casualties and losses
Unknown	Entire Army

The Battle of Bilaspur was fought in 1711 by Sikh forces led by Banda Singh Bahadur and the rulers of the Sivalik Hills led by Raja Ajmer Chand of Princely State of Kahlur (Bilaspur).

== Battle ==
After escaping from Lohgarh, Banda Singh set his plans in motion by issuing Hukamnamas that called upon people to rise up and free Punjab, instructing them to gather at Kiratpur in the Shivalik Hills. His campaign began with an assault on Raja Ajmer Chand—a man who had long been a persistent irritant to Guru Govind Singh and had played a major role in the military campaigns led by both the hill chiefs and the imperial forces from Sirhind and Lahore against the Guru, Raja Ajmer Chand, along with other local hill rulers, had taken measures to reinforce the city’s defenses in anticipation of conflict.Despite these preparations and the determined resistance led by Raja Ajmer Chand and his coalition of allies, the fortified position at Bilaspur could not withstand the forceful advance of the Sikh army. In the ensuing battle, over thirteen hundred Mians—comprising both regular troops and irregular forces—were completely defeated. Their bodies were methodically gathered into groups of one hundred and interred in thirteen long ditches. As a consequence of this decisive victory, Bilaspur fell to the Sikhs, and they seized a substantial amount of treasure from the town.

== Aftermath ==
The crushing defeat not only weakened the Raja of Kahlur and his allies, but also struck fear into the hearts of other Rajput chieftains in the Shiwaliks, who dreaded the harsh retribution that might follow if they opposed the advancing Khalsa. As a result, many chose to avoid further bloodshed by surrendering to Banda Singh, joining the Sikh camp, pledging their loyalty, and offering tribute to the Sikh treasury. Both Kulu and Chamba submitted on their own, and Udai Singh of Chamba further solidified his commitment by marrying his daughter, Susheel Kaur, to Banda Singh Bahadur, whose striking beauty—with large eyes, imposing limbs, and delicate grace—evoked the very image of a goddess of love.

== See also ==
- Nihang
- Martyrdom in Sikhism
