= Shahabad, Alwar =

Shahbad is a village in Tijara Tehsil in Alwar District of Rajasthan State, India. It is located 52 km towards North from District headquarters Alwar. 5 km from Tijara. 174 km from State capital Jaipur. Firuz Khan Mewati a Commandant in Mughal Army was granted the Jagir of Shahbad by Emperor Bahadur Shah I in 1710.
