= Battle of Sadhaura =

1710 battle

- Part of Mughal Sikh Wars
Date	1710
Location	Sadhaura
Result	Sikh victory
Territorial changes	Sadhaura captured by the Sikhs.

Belligerents
First Sikh State: Peasants	Mughal Empire: Sayyids; Shaykhs

Commanders and leaders
Banda Singh Bahadur; Baj Singh; Binod Singh; Baba Deep Singh	Osman Khan (executed)

Casualties and losses
Unknown	Heavy

The Battle of Sadhaura was fought between Sikhs and the Mughal, Sayyid, and Shaykh forces in Sadhaura in 1710. The imperial forces were defeated and took refuge behind the city's walls. Banda's forces captured the fort and levelled it to the ground. It resulted in a victory for the Sikhs where Banda Singh Bahadur defeated Osman Khan.

== Background ==
Sadhaura was ruled by Osman Khan, who had tortured and executed the Muslim Pir Syed Badruddin Shah (also known as Pir Budhu Shah), for helping Guru Gobind Singh in the Battle of Bhangani. And also for the atrocities committed against Hindus by Osman Khan where the cows were slaughtered in front of their homes and his order which forbade Hindus and Sikhs from cremating their dead and performing their religious events, which led the Sikhs to march to Sadhaura.

== Aftermath ==
Osman Khan was captured and chastised. Many aggrieved peasants who wanted to revolt against the ruling elites joined the forces of Banda Singh Bahadur and thus, the angry mob revolted with plunder and destruction of town and killed everyone who took shelter in the house of Syed Badruddin Shah. Banda's forces sacked the city and a general massacre of the city inhabitants ensued. Osman Khan was subsequently captured and hanged to death by the Sikhs. Banda Singh Bahadur later appointed his own governor in Sadhaura.
