= Nawab Feroz Khan =

Nawab Firuz Khan Mewati

Faujdar of Sirhind
- In office 1710–1712
- Leader: Bahadur Shah I

Personal details
- Born: 17th century Mewat, Mughal Empire (present-day Nuh district)
- Died: 1712 Near Delhi, Mughal Empire
- Relations: Raja Nahar Khan of Mewat (Ancestor)

Military service
- Years of service: Before 1710-1712
- Rank: Mansabdar
- Battles/wars: First Sikh State war; Battle of Thanesar (1710); Mughal war of succession (1712) †
- Allegiance: Mughal Empire

Firuz Khan Mewati was the first Nawab of Shahabad, Alwar and a Commandant in Mughal Army. He was a close confidant and trusted aide of Mughal Emperor Bahadur Shah I. He belonged to a Khanzada Muslim Rajput family which ruled the region of Mewat. He was a descendant of Raja Nahar Khan (through his son Malik Alaudin Khan), who was a Rajput ruler of Mewat State in 14th century. Due to his loyal service in Mughal Army, he was granted the Jagir of Simbli (later Shahbad) by Emperor Bahadur Shah I in 1710.

In 1710 he led the Mughal counter-offensive against the Sikhs, and defeated the Sikhs at the Battle of Thanesar (1710).

He was killed in the battle fought in 1712 between Mughal princes Jahandar Shah and Azim-ush-Shan.
