= Mian (clan) =

Rajput clan in Northern India

Miyan is a Rajput clan in the Indian states of Jammu and Kashmir, Uttarakhand and Himachal Pradesh.

The Miyan Rajputs are the clan to which the rulers of Jammu & Kashmir, Uttarakhand and rulers of erstwhile princely states of Himachal Pradesh belonged. They do not generally engage in trade or agriculture. They are major land owners and prefer to join cavalry or army by choice. The former ruling family of Jamwal Rajput called themselves Miyan Rajputs
