= Dharamyudh (Sikhism) =

Term in Sikhism

In Sikhism, dharamyudh, dharam-yudh or dharam yudh (Gurmukhi: ਧਰਮਯੁਧ) is a term which is variously translated as 'religious war', 'war of righteousness', 'war in defence of righteousness', or 'war for justice'. Though some core tenets in the Sikh religion are understood to emphasise peace and nonviolence, especially before the 1606 execution of Guru Arjan by Mughal emperor Jahangir, military force may be justified if all peaceful means to settle a conflict have been exhausted, thus resulting in a dharamyudh.

== Etymology ==
The first part of the term dharamyudh comes from Punjabi dharm or dharam (ਧਰਮ), which is usually translated as 'religion', although it is said to 'encapsulate a wider understanding of appropriate conduct, moral order, and bodily discipline' than the words 'religion' and 'religious practice' in English do. It is derived from Sanskrit dhárma (धर्म), which has various possible meanings including 'morality', 'justice', 'law', 'religion', 'devotion' and 'sacrifice'. The second part is a cognate of Hindi yuddh (युद्ध, meaning 'war'), derived from Sanskrit yuddhá (युद्ध, meaning 'battle', 'fight' or 'war'). The meaning of the term dharamyudh appears to have been somewhat ambiguous in the writings of the early Sikh Gurus, ranging from 'an interior, individual, spiritual struggle' to 'a war to defend one's beliefs', but by the 18th century, it was increasingly interpreted as 'a religiously sanctioned war against Muslims in particular', which scholars attribute to the changing political circumstances that the Sikhs found themselves in, or moved themselves into.

Hinduism also has a similar concept called dharma-yuddha that appears several times in the Mahabharatha.

== History ==
=== Militarisation of Sikhism (17th century) ===
Sikhism, founded in the late 15th century by Guru Nanak in the Punjab region, which was conquered by the Mughal Empire in the early 16th century, is generally considered to have been pacifist until the early 17th century. Perceiving the growth of the Sikhs as a threat, the Mughal authorities began to persecute them, and in 1606 Sikh leader Guru Arjan was executed by Mughal emperor Jahangir, apparently for refusing to convert to Islam, though this remains disputed. Sikhism split into two movements: one led by Guru Arjan's son Guru Hargobind began to regard Guru Arjan as a martyr, became more political and militaristic, and started organising armed rebellions against the Mughals; the other, the Minas led by Guru Arjan's older brother Prithi Chand, would be concerned with defining themselves as maintainers of the precept of interiorization, rejecting uprisings against the state. The militarized Sikhs justified armed conflict as self-defence against Mughal oppression, trained themselves to become warriors and nihangs, and organised themselves in jathas. In 1621, the first acts of open rebellion led to the eruption of the Mughal-Sikh Wars.

=== Sikh imperialism (1716–1849) ===
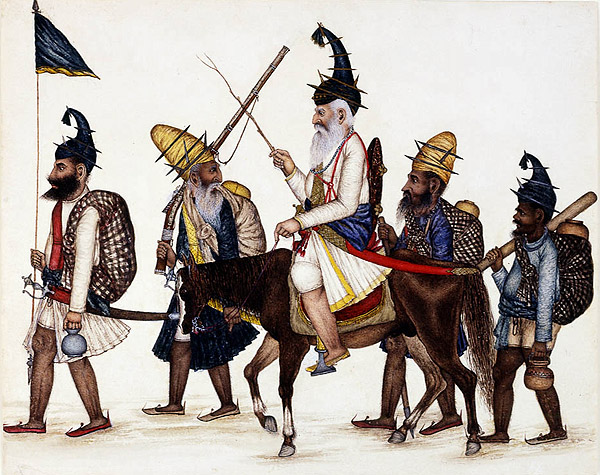
19th-century Akali Sikh warriors.

Over the course of several decades, small Sikh states known as misls combined to form the Sikh Confederacy in 1716, that jointly fought against Mughal power. Professionalisation of combat led the last Guru Gobind Singh to create the Khalsa, a special class of Sikh warriors, in 1699. In 1735, the jathas would be merged into a single army, the Dal Khalsa. During the Afghan–Sikh Wars, the Sikhs expanded even further and in 1799 the Sikh Empire was founded, which would last until 1849, when it was defeated and annexed by the British East India Company. Sikh soldiers would continue to serve in the British Indian Army.

=== Modern period (1970s–1995) ===
The Dharam Yudh Morcha ("righteous campaign"; morcha meaning "agitation") was a political movement launched in 1982 by the Sikh political party Akali Dal in partnership with Jarnail Singh Bhindranwale, with its stated aim being the fulfillment of a set of devolutionary objectives based on the Anandpur Sahib Resolution (1973). While this movement advocated for more autonomy for Punjab within India, the more radical separatist Khalistan movement also emerged, demanding a fully independent Sikh state. As the protest movement gained momentum, the government began to run out of room in jails for the over 25,000 peaceful volunteer protestors. Over 150,000 protestors would be arrested over the course of the morcha. The central government, instead of preempting the agitation regarding Punjab state by constitutionally referring all the legal issues to the Supreme Court of India as demanded, played up the threat to law and order, and was ineffective in resolving the issues politically. Extrajudicial killings by police forces of orthodox Sikh youth in rural areas during the summer and winter of 1982 and early 1983 resulted in retaliatory violence. Progressively, violent actions by Sikh militants to achieve their demands also took place. In June 1984, the movement reached its zenith during Operation Blue Star, when Indian security forces stormed the holiest Sikh site, the Golden Temple in Amritsar, where militants had set up their headquarters. In retaliation, the two Sikh bodyguards of Prime Minister Indira Gandhi assassinated her in October 1984. The killing was followed by many massacres of Sikhs as well as more Sikh militant attacks which cost dozens of lives. In the end, Sikh militancy did not bring about a separate state, and the Indian Government achieved victory in 1995.
