= Mustafabad, Haryana =

Mustafabad
- Town
- Location in Haryana, India Mustafabad (India)
- Coordinates: 30.202°N 77.147°E
- Country: India
- State: Haryana
- District: Yamunanagar
- Elevation: 256 m (840 ft)

Population (2001)
  - Total: 8,513

Languages
  - Official: Hindi
  - Regional: Haryanvi
- Time zone: UTC+5:30 (IST)
- Postal code: 133103
- ISO 3166 code: IN-HR
- Vehicle registration: HR
- Website: haryana.gov.in

Mustafabad is a town in Yamunanagar District in the Indian state of Haryana. As of 2016, its name has been changed to Saraswati Nagar.

== Etymology ==
According to government records, the town was earlier known as Saraswati Tirth which was later under Muslim rule renamed as Mustafabad. It was officially renamed to Saraswati Nagar via a notification by the BJP government in 2016 after the mythical Sarasvati River's paleochannel flowing through there.

== Geography ==
Mustafabad is 18 km from Jagadhri and 23 km from Yamunanagar. The city's official name, Saraswati Nagar, arises from the presence of the mythical Saraswati River. There is an old Shiva temple near this river.

== Demographics ==
As of 2001 India census, Mustafabad had a population of 8513. Males constitute 53% of the population and females 47%. Saraswati Nagar has an average literacy rate of 72%, higher than the national average of 59.5%: male literacy is 77%, and female literacy is 68%. In Mustafabad, 12% of the population is under 6 years of age. The town has majority Hindu population with all major religions.
