= Sadaura =

Sadhaura Sadhu-Rah Sadhaura
- Town
- Location in Haryana, India Sadhaura (India)
- Coordinates: 30.3833°N 77.2167°E
- Country: India
- State: Haryana
- District: Yamunanagar

Population (2011)
  - Total: 25,693

Languages
  - Official: Hindi, Haryanvi
- Time zone: UTC+5:30 (IST)
- Postal code: 133204
- ISO 3166 code: IN-HR
- Vehicle registration: HR-71
- Website: haryana.gov.in

Sadhaura is a town, near Yamunanagar city with Municipal Committee in Yamunanagar district in the Indian state of Haryana. The city of Yamunanagar, it is of great historic significance. Sadhaura is very old town many historical temples/Dargah are there like Manokamna Temple, Laxmi narayan Temple, Roza Peer Dargah are some famous places in Sadhaura. Local language is Puadhi

== History ==
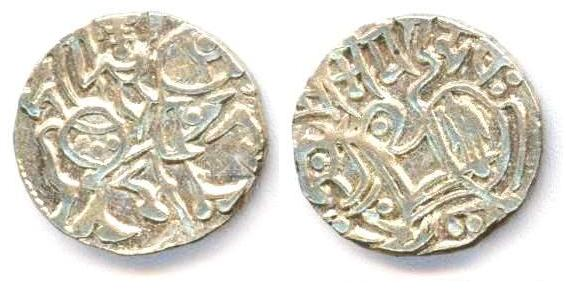
Coin of Hindu Kabul Shahi king of Kabul and Gandhara: king Samanta Deva, c. 850–1000 CE.

Sadhuara, steeped in history is a sanskrit language composite of sadhu (saint) and dwara (way), meaning "the way of saints" This used to be a camping ground for the hindu sadhus on the way to ganges pilgrimage.

Alexander Cunningham, conducted his exploration here at Sadhaura in 1879. He described an old ruinous fort and excavated many coins from here. The discovery of ancient copper cast coins, Kuninda coins (of 2nd century BCE to 3rd century CE Kuninda Kingdom), Kushano-Sasanian Coinage (of 3rd century CE Indo-Sasanian Kingdom), coins of Samanta Deva (from circa 850–1000 CE of Hindu Kabul Shahi dynasty of Gandhara in Afghanistan) from Sadhaura point towards the antiquity of the place.

Banda Singh Bahadur defeated local Mughal forces and built his Lohgarh Sahib Fort at nearby Lohgarh in 1709 after his conquest of the area in the wins of Battle of Chappar Chiri and Battle of Sadhaura. He killed the local Mughal chief of Sadaura, Usman Khan, to avenge the killing of Pir Budhan Shah. The historical book, "Twarikh Khasa" chronicles, "Nawab usman Khan of Sadhora was so cruel and fanatical that he used to have cows slaughtered and uneatable parts of cows he would have them thrown into the Hindus homes. He never allowed them to cremate their dead and forcibly matched Hindu brides to Musalmen. The Jazia was collected in most humiliating ways so that they might be more easily converted to Islam." In 1710 AD Battle of Samana, Banda Singh Bahadur also killed infamous Governor of Sirhind Wazir Khan (real name Mirza Askari) who had ordered the merciless murder of Guru Gobind Singh's young sons, 6 years old Sahibzada Fateh Singh and 9 years old Sahibzada Zorawar Singh by bricking up alive within a wall in 1705 AD. Wazir Khan was beheaded by the Sikh army led by Banda Singh Bahadur outside the Sirhind city in the Battle of Chappar Chiri in May 1710. "Qatalgarhi" haveli here is the home of muslims who were massacre by him after they betrayed him in the war. Band bahadur demolished the fortress of Daura and hanged the Mughal faujdar and the town plundered. "Gurdwara Baba Banda Bahadur" inside the ruined fort later became ruined and a new "Gurdwara Baba Banda Bahadur" was constructed close to the fort wall, which is also known as "Quila Gurdwara" and "Gurdwara Qatalgarh".

Pir Budhan Shah, who helped Guru Gobind Singh against mughals in the 1688 battle of Bhangani in which all four sons of Shah were killed, has a gurdwara here named after him.

At present, 40-feet high mound survives narrating the past historic glory of Sadhaura and its fort.

The town also has a tomb of Shah Kumesh constructed in 1450 AD and a mosque from 1600 AD where an annual fair is held that was started by Bairam Khan in 1556 AD. Another ruined, "Sagni mosque", from ??th century lies in ruins.

There are also three old temples with sacred johad water ponds: Gaggarwala temple, Toronwala temple and Manokamna temple.

Nearby historic places include Buddhist Stupa at Chaneti, Buria - a town with connections to Birbal, Adi Badri Sarasvati udgam Sthal, Lohgarh Sikh capital of Banda Singh Bahadur.

== Demographics ==
As of 2011 India census, Sadaura had a population of 25,693. Males constitute 53% of the population and females 47%. Sadaura has an average literacy rate of 82%, higher than the national average of 59.5%: male literacy is 76%, and female literacy is 66%. In Sadaura, 21% of the population is under 6 years of age.

== Sadhaura Fort ==
Sadaura Fort is an ancient fort in Sadaura, as seen here.

== Gurudwaras ==
Gurdwara Baba Banda Bahadur, also sometimes known as Quila Gurdwara and Gurdwara Qatalgarh is the ancient privately managed gurudwara named after Banda Singh Bahadur.

Gurdwara Pir Buddhu Shah was built by local Sikh Singh Sabha more recently in honour of Pir Budhan Shah.

Gurudwara shri singh sabha ji was built by local Sikh, now its maintained by nabour Sikhs.
