= Battle of Thanesar (1710) =

Mughal victory over Sikhs in India

Date	13 November 1710
Location	Thanesar
Result	Mughal victory

Belligerents
Mughal Empire	First Sikh State

Commanders and leaders
Firuz Khan Mewati (WIA) Sayyid Wajih-ud-din Khan Barha	Binod Singh Ram Singh

The Battle of Thanesar (1710) was one among a series of battles fought between Nawab Firuz Khan Mewati and Governor Binod Singh as he was ordered by the Mughal Imperial government to chastise the Sikh rebellion. Firuz Khan was sent in the vanguard while Sayyid Wajih-ud-din of the Sadaat-e-Bara was sent to reinforce him. It resulted in a victory for the Mughals as Nawab Firuz Khan Mewati cleared Thanesar, in northern India.

== Aftermath ==
Firuz Khan after clearing Thanesar would move onto Shahabad Markanda, ten miles further to the north, which was also taken by the Mughals. Therefore, Firuz Khan won all four engagements with Binod Singh. Hundreds of Sikhs who were made prisoner were strung up by Firuz to the road-side trees, their long hair being twisted to perform the office of a rope. Firuz Khan was awarded the Faujdari of Sirhind.
