= Chaar Sahibzaade: Rise of Banda Singh Bahadur =

- Official poster
- Directed by: Harry Baweja
- Written by: Harry Baweja; Harman Baweja
- Produced by: Pammi Baweja; Jyoti Deshpande
- Narrated by: Om Puri
- Edited by: Ninad Khanolkar
- Music by: Harry Baweja; Jaidev Kumar; Rabbi Shergill; Nirmal Singh
- Production company: Baweja Movies
- Distributed by: Eros International
- Release date: 11 November 2016
- Running time: 134 minutes
- Country: India
- Language: Punjabi

Chaar Sahibzaade 2: Rise of Banda Singh Bahadur (transl. Four Princes 2: Rise of Banda Singh Bahadur) is a 2016 Indian Punjabi-language animated film, directed and produced by Harry Baweja. It is the sequel to the 2014 film Chaar Sahibzaade. The film was released on 11 November 2016.

== Plot ==
The film is based on the struggle between Khalsa and Mughals. After the Battle of Muktsar, Guru Gobind Singh Ji settled at Nanded. There he met Madho Das, later known as Banda Singh Bahadur. Guru Gobind Singh Ji baptised him and sent him along with Baj Singh, Binod Singh, Ram Singh, Daya Singh, Kahan Singh and 20 other Sikhs to Khanda, India to fight mughal tyranny in Punjab and also gave him Hukamnama for Sikhs to join his army on the way.

Banda Singh Bahadur camped at Bharatpur and freed the people of a village from local bandits. Then he fought the Battle of Sonipat, the Battle of Ambala, and Kaithal and conquered them. In the Battle of Samana, Banda Singh gained a marvellous victory. At Samana, Banda made land reforms and abolished the zamindari system and granted property rights to tillers of the land.

Then he fought battles at Malerkotla, Ghuram, Kesar, Shahabad, Ambala, Mustafabad, Nahan, and Kapuri and conquered them. He fought the Battle of Rahon (1710) and captured Rahon. Thereafter, Banda fought the Battle of Sadhaura and killed Faujdar Osman Khan of Sadhaura.

In the Battle of Chappar Chiri, Sikhs defeated the Mughal army. Sikh General Fateh Singh beheaded Wazir Khan. Sikhs also killed Diwan Suchananda, and Banda established the first Khalsa Raj in Punjab.

== Marketing ==
A virtual reality game has been installed to the theatres for younger audiences.

== Soundtrack ==
The soundtrack of the film is composed by Harry Baweja, Jaidev Kumar, Rabbi Shergill and Nirmal Singh. The song "Hun Kis Theen" is based on the poetry of Bulleh Shah.

== Reception ==
=== Critical response ===
The film received mixed reviews from critics. Rohit Vats of Hindustan Times gave the film 2.5 star out of 5. He praised the voice over and certain portions of the film but criticised the running time and the animation. Jasmine Singh of The Tribune gave the film 2 out of 5, writing, "Chaar Sahibzaade- Rise of Banda Singh Bahadur sets high standard in animation, but in terms of story and screenplay the film could not blow the victory trumpet.". Nihit Bhave of The Times of India gave the film 3 stars praising the story but criticised the animation as he felt that " It is like watching Baahubali through a Chhota Bheem filter.". Indo-Asian News Service gave the film 2.5 stars out of 5 stating "Overall, this epic story will appeal only to Sikhs and those who have a keen interest in history."

=== Box office ===
In its first weekend, the film grossed ₹38.5 million from overseas.

=== Awards ===
List of awards and nominations
Award	Date of ceremony	Category	Recipient(s)	Result	Ref(s)
1st Filmfare Punjabi Awards	31 March 2017	Best Film	Pammi Baweja	Nominated	
1st Filmfare Punjabi Awards	31 March 2017	Best Playback Singer (Male)	Amrinder Gill ( for song "Bade chaava naal")	Nominated	

== See also ==
- Punjabi cinema
- List of indian animated feature films
