= Siege of Sirhind =

1710 conflict

- Part of Mughal-Sikh Wars
Date	12–14 May 1710
Location	Sirhind (modern Punjab, India)
Result	Sikh victory

Belligerents
First Sikh State	Mughal Empire

Commanders and leaders
Banda Singh Bahadur; Fateh Singh	Sucha Nand (executed)

Strength
Unknown	Unknown

Casualties and losses
500	Unknown

The siege of Sirhind was fought between the Mughal Empire and Sikh forces in 1710. The Sikhs besieged, stormed, captured, plundered and razed the city of Sirhind after defeating and beheading Wazir Khan in the Battle of Chappar Chiri.

== Background ==
The city of Sirhind was anathema to the Sikhs who were raged to take vengeance upon the Mughal regime of Sirhind, under whom the two young children of Guru Gobind Singh were executed on the order of the Governor of Sirhind, Wazir Khan and his dewan, Sucha Nand. Some prominent towns on the way to Sirhind were captured and plundered including Sonepat, Kaithal, Samana, Shahabad, Mustafabad and Sadhaura, as they could provide military assistance to the Mughal government of Sirhind. Due to consistent victories, many plunderers, looking to prey upon the riches within the walls of Sirhind, also followed Banda Singh Bahadur and his Sikh troops on his march to Sirhind.

== Siege ==
After defeating and killing Wazir Khan in the Battle of Chappar Chiri, Banda Singh Bahadur and his forces began their march to Sirhind, roughly 10 miles from the battlefield. The gates of the city were closed, and the guns mounted on the fort's walls maintained steady fire on the Sikhs and managed to inflict considerable losses upon them. Fighting resumed on May 13, the fort guns had managed to kill 500 of Banda's troops, in response, the Sikhs fired a deadly volley on the fort guns, rendering them useless and attacked the city gates, successfully managing to open some of them.

== Capture ==
On 14 May 1710, Banda and his army entered and captured Sirhind, and an immense destruction of life and property ensued shortly after. Sucha Nand was captured alive and later executed, whereas other Hindus who contributed to the crimes of Wazir Khan were punished. Banda seized two crores (20 million) worth of government treasury and moveable property which was moved to Lohgarh, Bilaspur.

=== Atrocities on Muslims ===
A number of accounts point to general atrocities committed by Banda's troops on the Muslim community and their vassals in Sirhind; however during the expedition numerous Muslim tombs were spared including the mausoleums of Shaikh Ahmad Mujaddid Alif Sani leading to doubts on the extent.

Hari Ram Gupta noted that several notable Muslims saved their lives by converting to Sikhism. Yogesh Snehi noted that Banda Singh Bahadur destroyed imperial mosques and the fort of Sirhind during his raid, where the two young sons of Guru Gobind Singh were executed. V.D. Mahajan also writes that thousands of Muslims were killed during the siege. The New Cambridge History of India notes that the Sikhs massacred those who did not readily convert to Sikhism and destroyed the city buildings. According to Ganda Singh, allegations of desecrations of mosques were unfounded since the mausoleum of Shaikh Ahmad Mujaddid Alif Sani, which was the most magnificent buildings in the city, was left untouched after the battle. He further castigates the writers of the Siyar-ul-Mutakherin and Muntakhib-ul-Lubab for exaggerating Sikh atrocities, the statements of which were repeated by later writers like Mohammad Latif. He goes on to write that the Muslim populace, due to their affiliation with persecution and religious intolerance towards the poor and innocents, was subject to indiscriminate plunder by the Sikhs impelled by the memory of the execution of Guru Gobind Singh's sons and the host of plunderers and irregulars ravenously plundered and avenged personal animosities. Only the Muslims who disguised themselves and hid themselves in the houses of Hindus were able to escape injury. Likewise the Hindus who were guilty of crimes against the innocents were punished and the city was spared from complete destruction as local Hindus appealed for forgiveness, and amnesty was granted to the city inhabitants after a large ransom was paid to Banda Singh Bahadur. Khafi Khan's and Latif's account of the siege has also been criticized by Dr. Harbans Sagoo, S.S. Gandhi, and Gokul Chand Narang as erroneous, lacking critical analysis and understanding, and on the basis of the chroniclers being Muslims and therefore ostensibly impartial to their regime.

== Aftermath ==
After the conquest of Sirhind, Banda Singh ousted the Muslim officers from all 28 parganahs of the Sirhind division and replaced them with his own men. He appointed Baj Singh as the Governor of Sirhind and Ali Singh of Salaudi as his deputy, and struck coins. Although the Mughals could regain control of the urban areas of Sirhind, they were unable to police the countryside, allowing Banda and his men to establish a parallel authority within those areas by levying taxes, raiding towns and trade routes and striking their own coinage. Banda Singh made Lohgarh, Bilaspur as the capital of the First Sikh State, made his own administrative arrangements, appointed his own faujdars, diwans and kardars (tax officers), and used his own inscribed and authorized seal on his orders. He further abolished the zamindari system (feudal system) and distributed land among the peasants.

After the victory, due to the reports of intolerance and prejudiced treatment by Muslims from towns of Saharanpur, Behar, Nanauta and Jalalabad, Banda marched to engage the Imperial Mughal Army in battle. With the entire province of Sirhind under his possession, Banda Singh became popular as the defender of the faith and champion of the oppressed.

== See also ==
- Battle of Samana
