= Lohgarh =

City in Haryana, India

- City
- Location in Haryana, India Lohgarh (India)
- Coordinates: 30°25′43.38″N 77°24′25.11″E
- Country: India
- State: Haryana
- District: Yamunanagar district
- Tehsil: Bilaspur
- Postal code: 135102
- ISO 3166 code: IN-HR
- Vehicle registration: HR-71
- Website: haryana.gov.in

Lohgarh is a city in the Bilaspur tehsil in the state of Haryana in India. It was the capital of the First Sikh State under Banda Singh Bahadur from 1710 to 1716. It contains several prominent sites such as the Lohgarh Sahib Gurdwara, the Lohgarh Fort and the Banda Singh Bahadur Statue.

The city of Lohgarh is currently under development by the Haryana government to make it a tourist spot, especially for Sikh pilgrims.

== Etymology ==
The contemporary historians were Mughals, therefore they deliberately projected a wrong picture of Lohgarh. Later on, the other historians picked, their references in context of Lohgarh leading to depiction of wrong interpretation of history. Muklishgarh is almost 30 km away from Lohgarh.

Islam Shah Suri (original name Salim Shah) son of Sher Shah Suri (original name Farid Khan), in his days of brief rule, began to build a strong fortress under the name of "Pawangarh". After the demise of their rule it remain unfinished and fell into ruins.(Later Mughals, p. 109). But the name "Moklespore" (mentioned in Rennels map of countries between Delhi and Candhaar, 1792), it is itself suggestive of its founder. Iradat Khan calls it Daber. (Jonathan Scot’s Translation of the Memoirs of Iradat Khan, p. 61.)

Historian Dr. J. S. Grewal in his book "The Sikhs of the Punjab" (p. 83) writes, Banda Singh Bahadur adopted Mukhlispur, an imperial fort now given the name of Lohgarh, as his capital and struck a new coin in the name of Guru Nanak and Guru Gobind Singh.

Historian Dr. Hari Ram Gupta in his book "History of the Sikhs" (p. 11), "he therefore established his headquarters, in the beginning of February 1710, at Mukhlispur situated in lower Sivalik Hills south of Nahan, about 20 km from Sadhaura. Its fort stood on a hill top. Two kuhls or water channels flowed at its base and supplied water to it. This fort was repaired and put in a state of defence. All the money, gold and costly material acquired in these expeditions were deposited here. He struck coins and issued orders under his own seal. The name of Mukhlispur was changed to Lohgarh, and it became the capital of the first Sikh state."

Historian Dr. Ganda Singh in his book "Life of Banda Singh Bahadur" writes, "the fort of Mukhlispur was built by one Mukhlis Khan under instructions from Emperor Shsh Jahan who accasionally spent his summer there (p. 55-56). It was a strong hill-fort about half-way between the towns of Sadhaura and Nahan (about nine kos from Sadhaura), within the boundary of the village of Amuwal, among the steeps of the Himalayas on an elevated summit which could be approached only by craggy rocks and ravines. It was surrounded by two rivulets, "Pamuwali" and "Daska-wali" Khols or Khuds, which originally formed only one stream, parting into two to embrace the hillock of the fort. The fort was in a most neglected condition when Banda Singh occupied it. It was soon repaired and was given the new name of Lohgarh or Iron Fort."

Khushwant Singh in his book "A History of the Sikhs"(second edition, p. 103), "Banda was too shrewd to place much reliance on the loyalties of the new converts and he made the old fort of Mukhlisgarh, in the safety of the Himalayas, his headquarters. At Mukhlisgarh, Banda learned that Bahadur Shah (Mughal emperor), after subjugation of Rajasthan and not likely to return to Delhi before the monsoons. Banda decided to utilize the opportunity to destroy the remaining vestiges of Mughal rule in northern India."

Surinder Singh in his book "Discovering Baba Banda Singh Bahadur" (p. 285-286) writes, "Banda Bahadur carried out the repairs to the Mukhlispur fortess and renamed it as Lohgarh. He also fortified it by laying 3 to 4 ft high and 50 to 100 ft long stone walls, 52 in number. Sikh soldiers could stay behind these walls and the Mughal forces trying to reach the fortress had to face their gunshots and arrows about 15 times before they could reach the top. Large-scale troops could not climb and on two occasions when they were able to follow Banda Bahadur and his troops up to Lohgarh, the imperial forces lost a large number of soldiers but were not able to catch Banda Bahadur and his men. This small defensive arrangement has been deemed as a capital by large number of historians from Punjab when the site was hardly about 100 to 200 km from major parts of Punjab and could be easily visited and examined. The author had the occasion to visit and examine this-the Sadhaura-Lohgarh-Sitaragarh axis, a large number of times in his capacity as convenor for the raising of a suitable memorial by the Shiromani Gurdwara Parbandhak Committee. This author is of the optinion that half an acre of land on which Lohgarh has been raised is generally occupied by medium sixed havelis (manor houses). He is also of the opinion that Lohgarh was not declared as the capital of the nascent Sikh state because three series of the coins issued by Banda Bahadur form 1710-12 does not carry any name of the city or town after the word zarb meaning ‘minted at’. Had it been fixed as a capital, the name of Lohgarh would have certainly come on the coin. The legend after the word zarb, is ‘place of perfect peace, picture of a beautiful city where the fortunate throne of Khalsa is to be located."

== Location ==
It is situated on an elevated summit at the steps of Himalayas, about halfway between Nahan in Himachal Pradesh and Sadaura in Haryana about 21 miles from Sadaura, it could be approached only by curly rocks and ravines. From Chandigarh to Raipur Rani, Sadhaura, Bilaspur, Haryana, Kapal Mochan, Lohgarh Sahib. From other parts of Haryana of Uttar Pradesh, proceed to Sadhaura. In 2018, a 40-feet wide road was built from village Bhagwanpur to Lohgarh.

== History ==
The Lohgarh Sahib (meaning Iron Fort) about 30 kilometres from Sadaura was made by Bhai Lakhi Rai Banjara under instructions from Guru Hargobind. Its construction began sometimes in 1620s and was finally completed in 1710. It was made capital of the First Sikh State in February 1710 by Banda Singh Bahadur who had earlier captured Samana in 1709 and later also captured Sadaura in Battle of Sadhaura in 1709 after Muslims of Lahore province had declared jihad against the forces of Banda Singh Bahadur. He captured Sirhind on May 12, 1710, after victory in the battle of in the Battle of Chappar Chiri on May 10, 1710. He abolished Zamidari system and gave legal ownership of the land to cultivators. Boundaries of his reign had Sivalik Hills in the north, Yamuna in the east, Tangri river (tributary of Ghaggar river) in the west, and south boundary was Karnal-Thanesar-Kaithal-Samana. After the death of 10th Sikh Guru, Guru Gobind Singh at Nanded in 1708, Banda Singh Bahadur left Nanded marched 1700 km across Maharashtra and Rajputana that were in revolt against Mughals and to reach near the villages of Khanda and Sehri (present day Kharkhauda Tehsil of Sonepat district of Haryana) a year later in 1709. He established the First Sikh State headquartered at Lohgrah fort. The entire treasury acquired in his expeditions, including treasure worth 2 crore (20 million) won in Sirhind, was deposited here in Lohgarh Sahib. The coins in the name of Guru Nanak and Guru Gobind Singh were minted and issued from here. He was brave in battles. He was brave when executed in Delhi by Mughals. He punished local Mughal chief of Sadaura, Usman Khan, to avenge the killing of Pir Buddhu Shah. The historical book, "Twarikh Khasa" chronicles, "Nawab Usman Khan of Sadhora was so cruel and fanatical that he used to have cows slaughtered and uneatable parts of cows he would have them thrown into the Hindus homes. He never allowed them to cremate their dead and forcibly matched Hindu brides to Muslims. The Jazia was collected in most humiliating ways so that they might be more easily converted to Islam."

In 1710 AD, Banda Singh Bahadur also killed infamous the Nawab of Sirhind, Wazir Khan (real name Mirza Askari) who had ordered the execution of Guru Gobind Singh's younger sons (6 years old Sahibzada Fateh Singh and 9 years old Sahibzada Zorawar Singh), in 1705. Wazir Khan was beheaded by the Khalsa Army led by Banda Singh Bahadur outside Sirhind in the Battle of Chappar Chiri in May 1710. Recently, the Government of Punjab has created Fateh Burj to commemorate the victory of Banda Singh Bahadur at Chappar Chiri, close to Ajitgarh, also known as Mohali.

Sikh rose in armed conflict after the fifth Sikh Guru, Guru Arjan was arrested, tortured and martyred on 30 May 1606 on the orders of Mughal Emperor Jahangir on his refusal to convert to Islam. His successor Guru Hargobind, was the sixth of the Sikh gurus. He was eleven years old when he became Guru on 30 May 1606, after the execution of his father, Guru Arjan, under the order of Mughal emperor Jahangir. He is remembered for initiating the saint soldier tradition of Miri Piri within Sikhism to resist Mughal persecution and protecting the freedom of religion.

=== First Battle of Lohgargh ===
Near the fort is a trench constructed by the Mughal Army during the siege. Mughal emperor Bahadur Shah I himself led the army to Sadaura and sent his army to besiege the fort of Lohgarh Sahib. The Khalsa soldiers fought here for one month under Banda Singh Bahadur. The fort was destroyed by Mughal artillery, Banda Singh had a narrow escape and could not be captured alive. At last they disappeared towards upper hills of the Nahan State through this trench. The Mughal Army was not able to capture them during the siege.

=== Khalsa currency and stamp ===
Banda Singh Bahadur issued Khalsa currency from here, a coin in the name of Guru Nanak-Gobind Singh with Persian inscription sikkah bar har do alam tegh-i-Nanak wahib ast, Fateh Gobind Singh shah-i-shahan Fazal-i-Sacha Sahib ast (Coin struck in the two Worlds; the sword of Nanak is the granter of desires; Victory to Gobind Singh, the King of Kings by the Grace of the True Lord). Banda Singh also had a Khalsa government stamp inscribed, Degh Tegh Fateh Nusrait-i-Bedirang Yaft az Nanak Guru Gobind Singh (The cauldron {symbol to feed the poor} and the sword {symbol of power to protect the weak and helpless} are Victorious and Unhesitating Patronage has been Obtained from Guru Nanak-Gobind Singh).

After Banda Singh Bahadur left Lohgarh in 1715 in search of a more secure place to defend against attacking Mughal forces, the Mughal Army and the forces of the Nahan State repeatedly demolished the fort at Lohgarh. Presently there are only ruins of the fort in form of a few stones.

=== Demolition of Lohgarh Fort ===
Lohgarh Fort was captured by the Mughal regime after the execution of Banda Singh Bahadur. Duty to demolish it was assigned to the Mughal Chowdhury Massa Ranghar (who was, later, killed by Sukha Singh and Mehtab Singh on 11 August 1740, for the desecration of the Harmindar Sahib). Demolition of the fort began in 1716 and it was completed in 1739. All the walls and trenches had been dismantled and the bricks and rocks were transported to far away places so that the Sikhs may not build the fort again.

=== Development and promotion in India (1947-present) ===
The Government of Haryana is developing Lohgarh as tourist destination. The development activities undertaken by the Government of Haryana include a 3 km road connecting Lohgarh to Adi Badri which is the point of origin of Sarasvati river, a two-kilometre-long (1.2 mi) road and bridge on Somb river to connect Bhagwanpura village with Lohgarh, construction of a dam to ensure year-round supply of water to Lohgarh and a memorial of the brave general Banda Singh Bahadur built at Lohgarh on the similar grandeur as of the one at Chappar Chiri in Punjab.

As part of INR 1,200 crore (12 billion) Morni to Kalesar tourism development plan announced in January 2019, Government of Haryana is developing Lohgarh, along with Kalesar Mahadev Temple, Kapal Mochan Tirth, Panchmukhi Hanuman Temple of Basatiyawala and Sharda Mata Temple of Chotta Trilokpur.

In 2025, Baba Banda Singh Bahadur Lohgarh Foundation Trust was inaugurated by Urban Affairs and Power Minister Manohar Khattar Lal.

== Sites ==
=== Lohgarh Fort ===
Lohgarh Fort, the Sikh capital, established by Banda Singh Bahadur, is spread in almost 7000 acres and is situated in the old state of Nahan, now in District Yamuna Nagar of Haryana and District Sirmour of Himachal Pradesh. The fort Lohgarh is in the revenue estates of Lohgarh (HP), Haripur (HP), Jhil (HP), Mehtawali (HP), Palori (HP), Sukron (HP), Maharonwala (HP), Bhagwanpur Nathauri (Haryana), Dhanaura (Haryana), Nagli (Haryana) and Mohindinpur (Haryana). The circumference of the fort about 30 km. Archaeological evidence and engineering formulas (time and motion study) depicts that, it took almost 70 to 80 years for making fortifications in such a huge area.

=== Lohgarh Sahib Gurudwara ===
Lohgarh Sahib Gurdwara is built on the land owned by the village panchayat, which is currently encroached by Nihangs of Budha Dal although they have one acre of land on their name. SGPC purchased 8 acres of land in 2008 but has not constructed anything. Gurudwara Paonta Sahib Management Committee has also purchase a piece of land in 2007, which also remains without construction. More recently, "Lohgarh Trust" purchased 3 acres of land for construction of Gurudwara Lohgarh.

=== Banda Singh Bahadur statue ===
The Banda Singh Bahadur statue was installed by the Sikh sangat (congregation) at Gurdwara Lohgarh Sahib during tercentenary celebrations.

== See also ==
- Panoramio photo of Gurudwara Quila Lohgarh only left mark of first Sikh state set up by Banda Singh Bahadur
- Sarasvati river
- Kaushalya Dam
- Morni
