= Fateh Singh (Sikh warrior) =

Sikh warrior (died 1716)

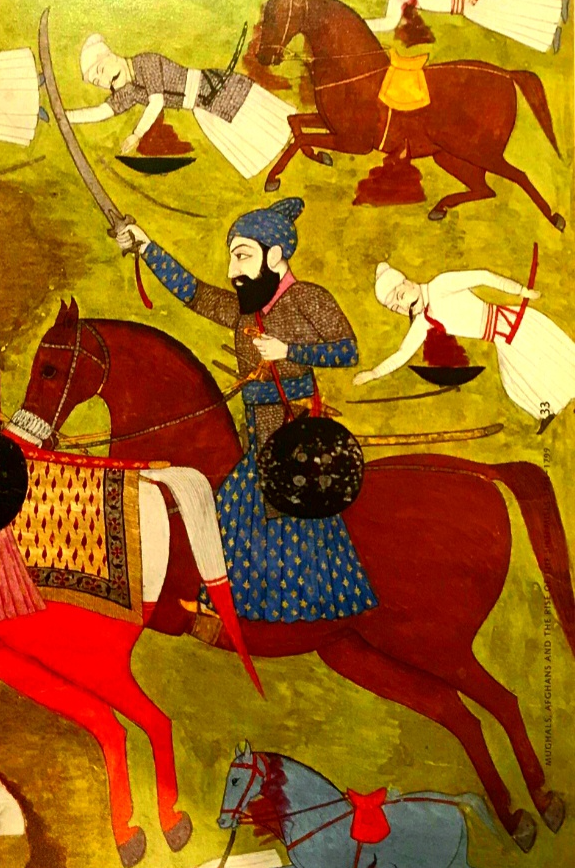
Detail of an illustrated folio of ‘Tawarikh-i Jahandar Shah’, Awadh or Lucknow, ca.1770, showing the climax of the Battle of Sirhind fought in 1710. Fateh Singh is on his horse

Fateh Singh (died July 1716) was a warrior in Sikh history. He is known for beheading Wazir Khan who was the Mughal Deputy Governor of Sirhind, administering a territory of the Mughal Empire between the Sutlej and Yamuna rivers. Wazir Khan was infamous for ordering the execution of the two young sons of Guru Gobind Singh, Sahibzada Fateh Singh and Sahibzada Zorawar Singh in 1704.

== Early life and conquest ==
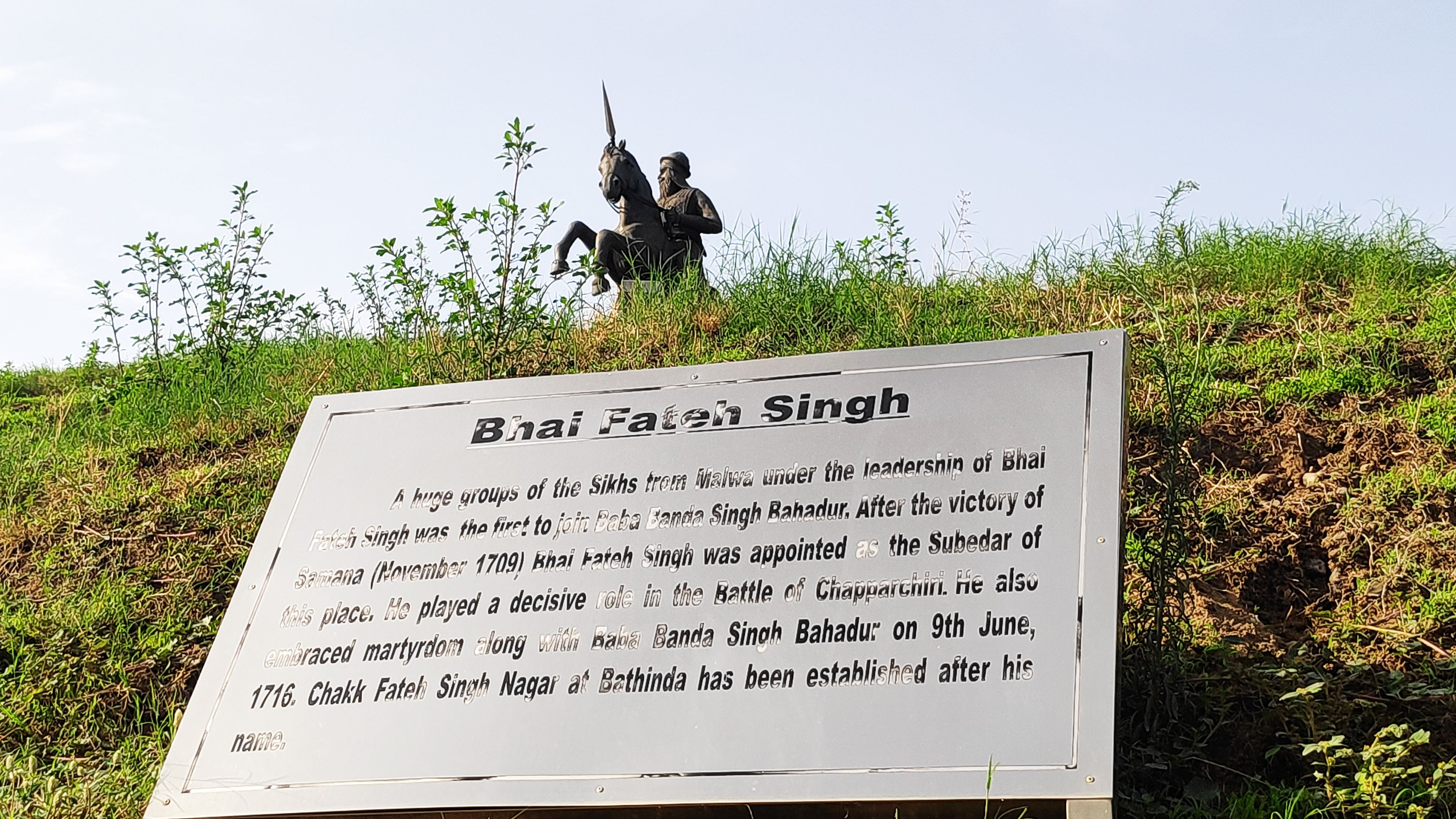
Fateh Singh statue at Fatehburj Sahib

Not much is known about Fateh Singh’s early life. Bhai Fateh Singh was the great-grandson of prominent Sikh preacher Bhai Bhagtu. Fateh Singh would join Banda Singh Bahadur in his liberation of Punjab. He participated in the Battle of Samana in 1709, launching an attack on the town of Samana on 26 November of the same year. Samana was home to Jalad-ud-Din who was the executioner of Guru Tegh Bahadur. It was also home to Shasil Beg and Bashil Beg, the executioners of Baba Zorawar Singh and Baba Fateh Singh. Due to this, the town was widely hated among the Sikhs. The town also contained large amounts of treasure and loot that would finance the Sikh war effort. Banda Singh camped around 20 kilometres from Samana where he held a meeting with his generals to plan the attack. Among them was Fateh Singh. Their intelligence told them that the head of Samana was confident that he could repulse the Sikh attack. He did not increase defences out of confidence. Banda Singh, Fateh Singh, and the Sikh forces advanced upon Samana and were able to enter the town before the gates of the town could be closed. Fighting ensued in the streets of Samana between the Sikh and Mughal forces. The Local peasantry who were resentful towards the rich nobles of the town, began setting fire to the various mansions of the town. According to one source, “pools of blood flowed through the drains.” Another says that nearly 10,000 muslims being massacred.

Banda Singh, impressed by Fateh Singh’s bravery and spirt in battle, appointed him as Faujdar of Samana as well as Samana’s 9 parganas. Banda Singh conquered Ghuram and added it into Fateh Singh’s administration.

== Battle of Chappar Chiri ==
Fateh Singh was in the Sikh Army led by Banda Singh Bahadur during the Battle of Chappar Chiri in May 1710. Wazir Khan was killed in the battlefield by two Sikhs, Fateh Singh and Baj Singh. Fateh Singh, with the help of Baj Singh, beheaded Wazir Khan, who marched from Sirhind and joined the battle against the Sikhs on 10 May 1710, at Chappar Chiri where today Fateh Burj commemorates the battle. A fierce battle ensued between the Sikhs and the Mughals. Wazir Khan was killed by the combined effort of two Sikhs Baj Singh and Fateh Singh who dealt the death blow vertically cutting down Wazir Khan from his shoulder to his waist. The Mughal Army of Sirhind took to heel and the Sikh Army captured Sirhind on 12 May 1710. The city was thoroughly sacked and retribution was wreaked on Wazir Khan's soldiers, officials and anyone even remotely connected with the execution of the younger sons of Guru Gobind Singh. The planned razing of Sirhind could not be carried out as the Sikh Army had to switch over to guerrilla warfare once the Mughal Army came.

== Later life and death ==
Fateh Singh was eventually taken prisoner by the Mughal Army at Lohgarh in December 1710 and, after several years in jail, he was executed in Delhi in June 1716 along with Banda Singh Bahadur and his other companions including many famous soldiers of the Sikh Army.
