= Khanda Museum =

- ਖੰਡਾ ਮਿਊਜ਼ੀਅਮ
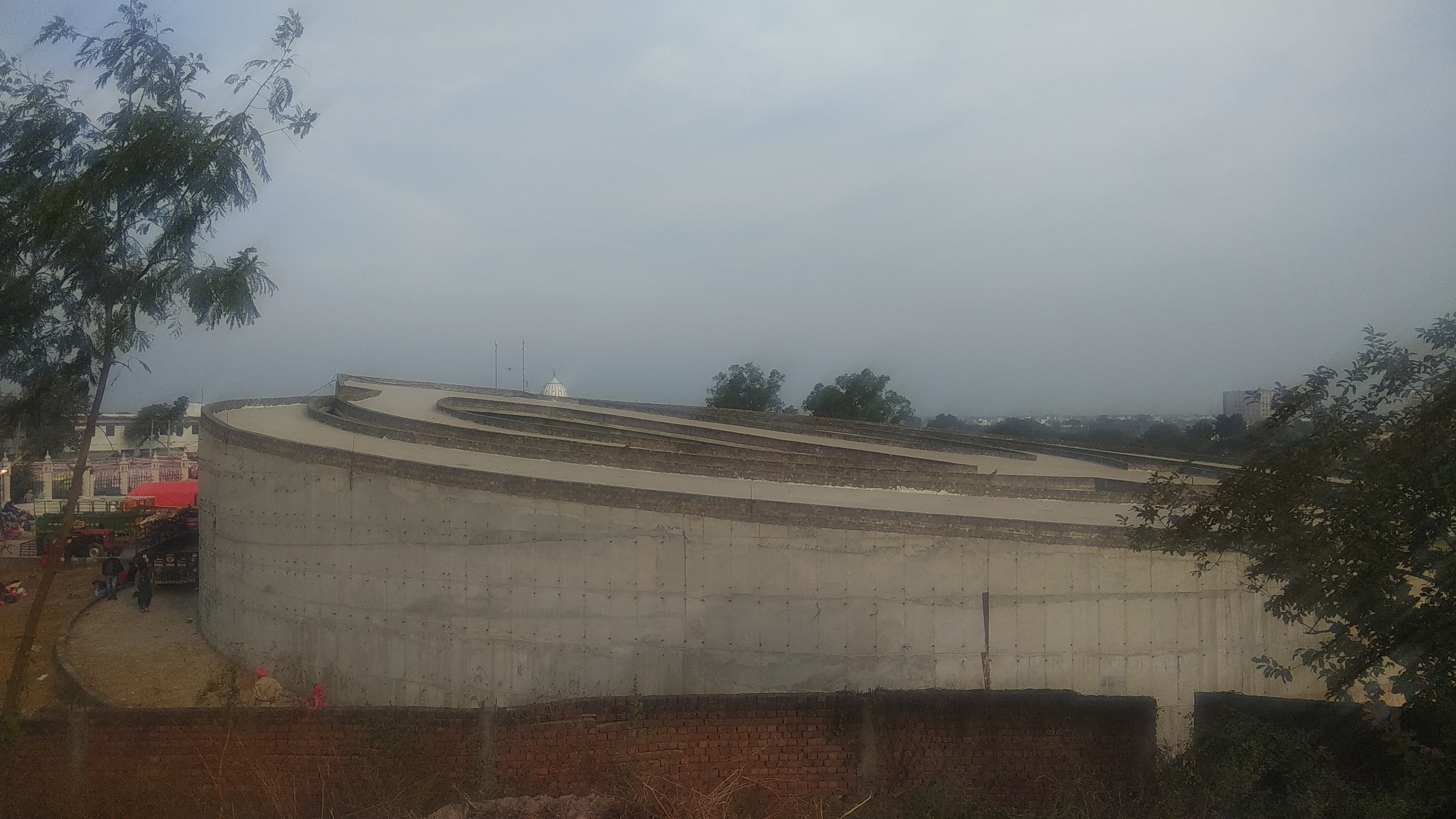
- Location: Fatehgarh Sahib, Punjab, India
- Coordinates: 30.65103°N 76.39355°E
- Type: Community museum
- Owner: SGPC
- Website: sgpc.net

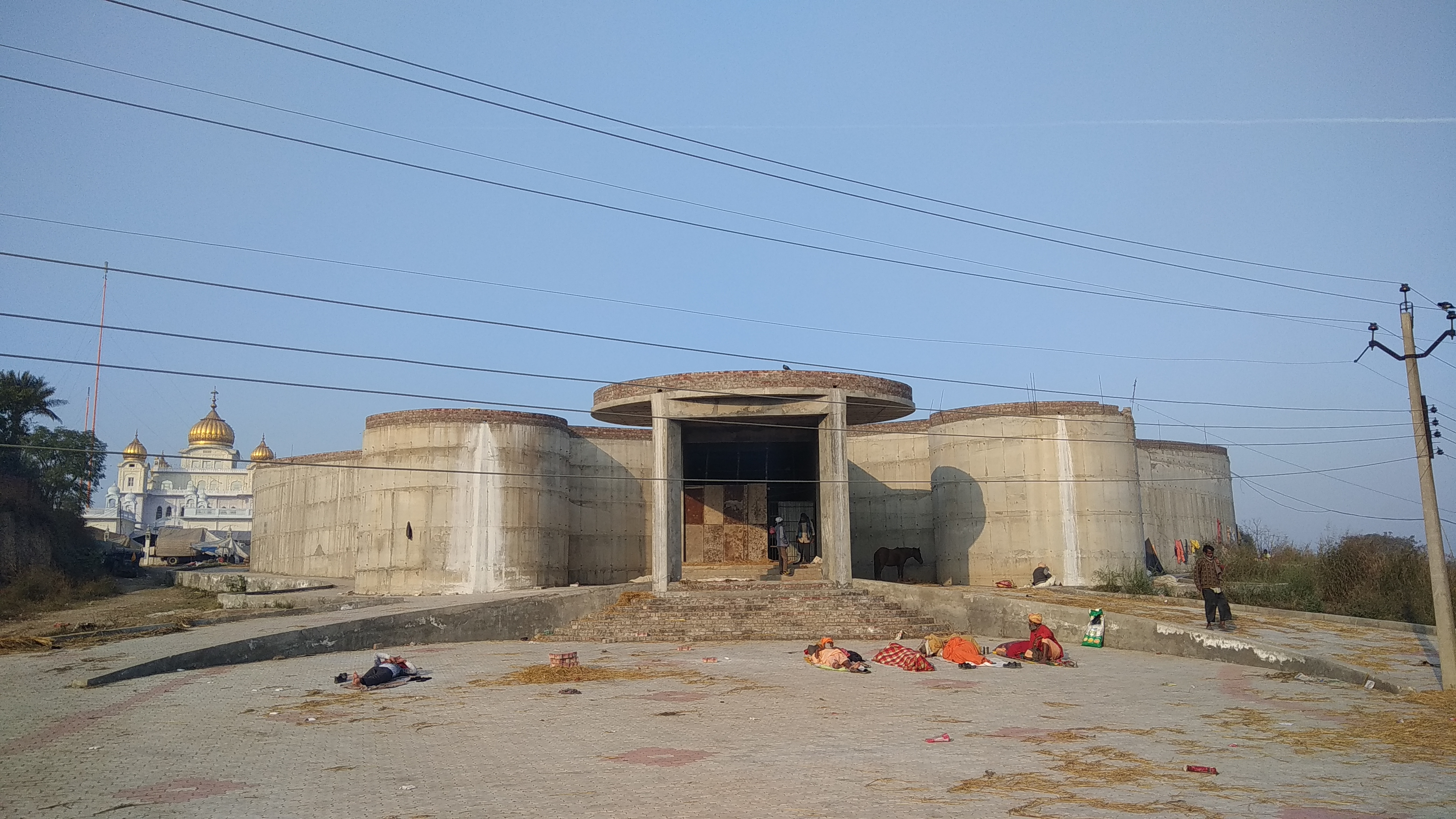
Khanda Museum under construction (Dec 2017)

Khanda Museum is a museum located at Fatehgarh Sahib and its building constructed in shape of Sikh religious symbol Khanda. The museum is built by SGPC in the memory of Sikh-warrior Banda Singh Bahadur and would exhibit his history. The museum is located near Gurdwara Fatehgarh Sahib. The museum opened on 7 January 2018.

== See also ==
- Fateh Burj
- Battle of Chappar Chiri
- Rauza Sharif
