= Binod Singh =

Sikh warrior

Baba Binod Singh
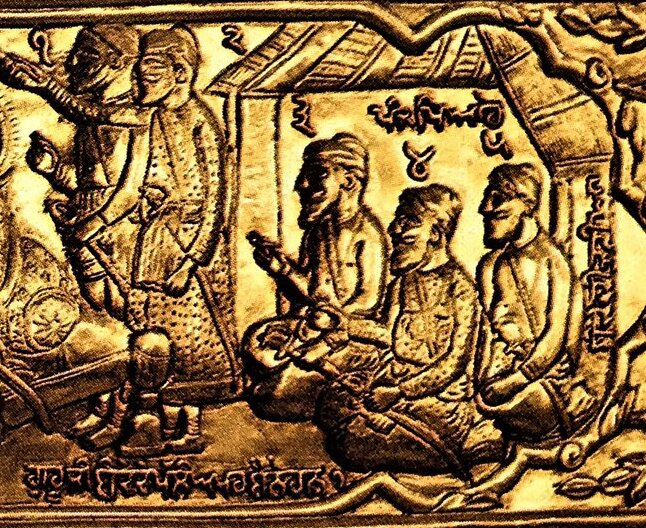
- Binod Singh, Kahan Singh, Baj Singh, Daya Singh, and Ram Singh depicted as a Panj Piare group from a gilded panel from Takht Hazur Sahib, Nanded

1st Jathedar of Buddha Dal
- In office 1708–1716
- Succeeded by: Baba Darbara Singh

Personal details
- Died: 1716 or 1721
- Known for: First Jathedar of Buddha Dal; Fighting the Mughal Empire along with Banda Singh

Military service
- Commander: Khalsa Fauj

Binod Singh, (died 1716 or 1721) a Trehan Khatri and a descendant of Guru Angad, was an army general and disciple of Guru Gobind Singh and was among few Sikhs who accompanied him to Nanded in 1706. After 1708, he and his son Kahn Singh were the leader of the Tatt Khalsa faction of the Sikhs, as opposed to the Bandai Khalsa.

== Early life and family ==
Little is known of his early life, not even his year of birth. Binod Singh was a descendant of Guru Angad. Binod Singh had a son named Kahan Singh, whom was also part of the Panj Piare quintet that accompanied Banda northwards. Binod Singh had a grandson named Miri Singh (son of Kahan Singh).

== Religious and military career ==
Binod Singh had followed Guru Gobind Singh from Delhi to Nanded in the Deccan. After Guru Gobind Singh died, Binod Singh became the principle ustad (teacher) of Shastar Vidya.

=== Alliance with Banda Singh Bahadur ===
Regarding Binod Singh, Kahn Singh Nabha states in Mahankosh:

ਦਸ਼ਮੇਸ਼ ਦਾ ਹਜ਼ੂਰੀ ਤੇਹਣ ਸਾਹਿਬਜ਼ਾਦਾ, ਜਿਸ ਨੂੰ ਦਸ਼ਮੇਸ਼ ਨੇ ਅਬਿਚਲਨਗਰ ਤੋਂ ਬੰਦੇ ਬਹਾਦੁਰ ਦੀ ਸਹਾਇਤਾ ਲਈ ਪੰਜਾਬ ਭੇਜਿਆ ਸੀ, ਅਤੇ ਇਸ ਧਰਮਵੀਰ ਨੇ ਪੰਥ ਦੇ ਨਾਲ ਹੋਕੇ ਬਹੁਤ ਜੰਗ ਜਿੱਤੇ.
The Huzoor Sahibzada of Guru Gobind Singh, who was sent to help Banda Bahadur in Punjab and fought many battles for Religion like a Warrior.

He was one of the five companions of Banda Bahadur (1670-1716) sent by the Guru in 1708 from Nanded to the Punjab to punish Wazir Khan, Nawab of Sirhind. This Panj Piare quintet, in-which Binod Singh was a member of, was instructed to accompany Banda Singh Bahadur northwards from the Deccan on the mission he had been assigned by the Guru. The Panj Piare quintet was reinforced with a group of 20 Sikhs, they would all join Banda Singh on his military expedition. Binod Singh was Banda Singh's ally in the campaign he launched upon arrival in the Punjab.

Binod had fought a pitched battle against Sher Muhammad Khan of Malerkotla State. Sher Muhammad Khan commanded the right wing of Wazir Khan's army whilst Binod Singh commanded the left wing of Banda's army. In the midst of fighting, the flank under the control of Binod was about to break but just at that moment Sher Muhammad Khan was killed by a gunshot, leading to the fleeing of his forces. Binod Singh commanded the left wing of Banda's army in the Battle of Chappar Chiri fought in May 1710. After conquest of the province of Sirhind, the frontier district of Karnal, bordering on Delhi territory, was entrusted to Binod Singh. Emperor Bahadur Shah sent Nawab Feroz Khan Mewati to suppress the Sikh revolt, with Binod Singh fighting four times to check this Mughal force, suffering defeat. Those four battles were fought at Tarori, second at Amin, 25 km north of Karnal, third at Thanesar, 8 km farther north, and the fourth at Shahabad, 22 km north of Thanesar.

=== Differences with Banda Bahadur ===
According to Some Historians, Baba Binod Singh did not agree to some of the innovations of Banda Singh Bahadur. As ordered by a Hukamnama by Mata Sundri, Binod Singh left Banda Bahadur with other Sikhs in October 1714 and declared themselves as Tatt Khalsa and followers of Banda were called Bandai Khalsa. Binod and 10,000 Sikhs left the ranks of Banda after this. Whilst Binod wished to obey the edict of Mata Sundari, he did not wish to fight against Banda.

According to Ganda Singh, a serious disagreement erupted between Binod Singh and Banda Singh during the Siege of Gurdas Nangal. Some sources, such as the Mahma Prakash, claim that the discord arose because Banda Singh wanted to take a second wife—an unlikely notion given their desperate, starving condition. More plausibly, the dispute centered on a proposal during a war council to abandon their current position and revert to their old tactic of breaking through enemy lines to reach safety. Banda Singh opposed this plan for reasons known only to him, while Binod Singh favored it. The disagreement soon escalated into a violent clash, with words giving way to the sound of clashing swords. In the heat of the fight, Kahan Singh, Binod Singh’s son, intervened to mediate and suggested that one of the two should leave. Binod Singh accepted this decision, mounted his horse, and rode out of the besieged area, single-handedly cutting down enemy soldiers as he made his escape.

After Binod Singh and other Sikhs left, Banda Bahadur was captured and prosecuted in Delhi. Binod Singh came to Goindwal after dispute with Banda Bahadur at Gurdas Nanagal. Binod Singh then stayed at Amritsar for a bit but after found employment with the Mughals and accompanied the Mughals when they besieged Banda Singh Bahadur's forces at Gurdas Nangal. However, Binod Singh did not wish to fight his co-religionists and tried to leave but the Mughals did not allow this to happen so they tried to eliminate Binod Singh and the retinue of a few thousand of Sikhs that accompanied him. Thus, after Binod Singh tried to retire from the fighting, him and his 10,000-strong force was attacked on all sides by the Mughals.

== Death ==
According to Khafi Khan, three to four thousand of his men were killed, filling the plain with blood. Binod Singh is believed to have lost his life in this massacre in 1716. The Sikhs under Binod who managed to escape the carnage were either captured by Muslims or roving bands of the Mughal army. Two-thousand decapitated Sikh heads, still bearing their kesh (unshorn hair) that was stuffed with hay, and a thousand chained Sikh prisoners, were sent by Abdus Samad Khan and Zakariya Khan to emperor Farrukhsiyar.

Other sources state Binod Singh was killed in a later clash with Mughal forces in 1721.

== Battles fought by Baba Binod Singh ==
- Battle of Sonipat
- Battle of Ambala
- Battle of Samana
- Battle of Sadhaura
- Battle of Chappar Chiri
- Battle of Rahon (1710)
- Battle of Kapuri
- Battle of Jammu
- Battle of Jalalabad (1710)
- Battle of Thanesar (1710)
- Battle of Lohgarh
- Battle of Gurdas Nangal or Siege of Gurdaspur
