= Battle of Chappar Chiri =

1710 conflict

- Part of Mughal-Sikh Wars
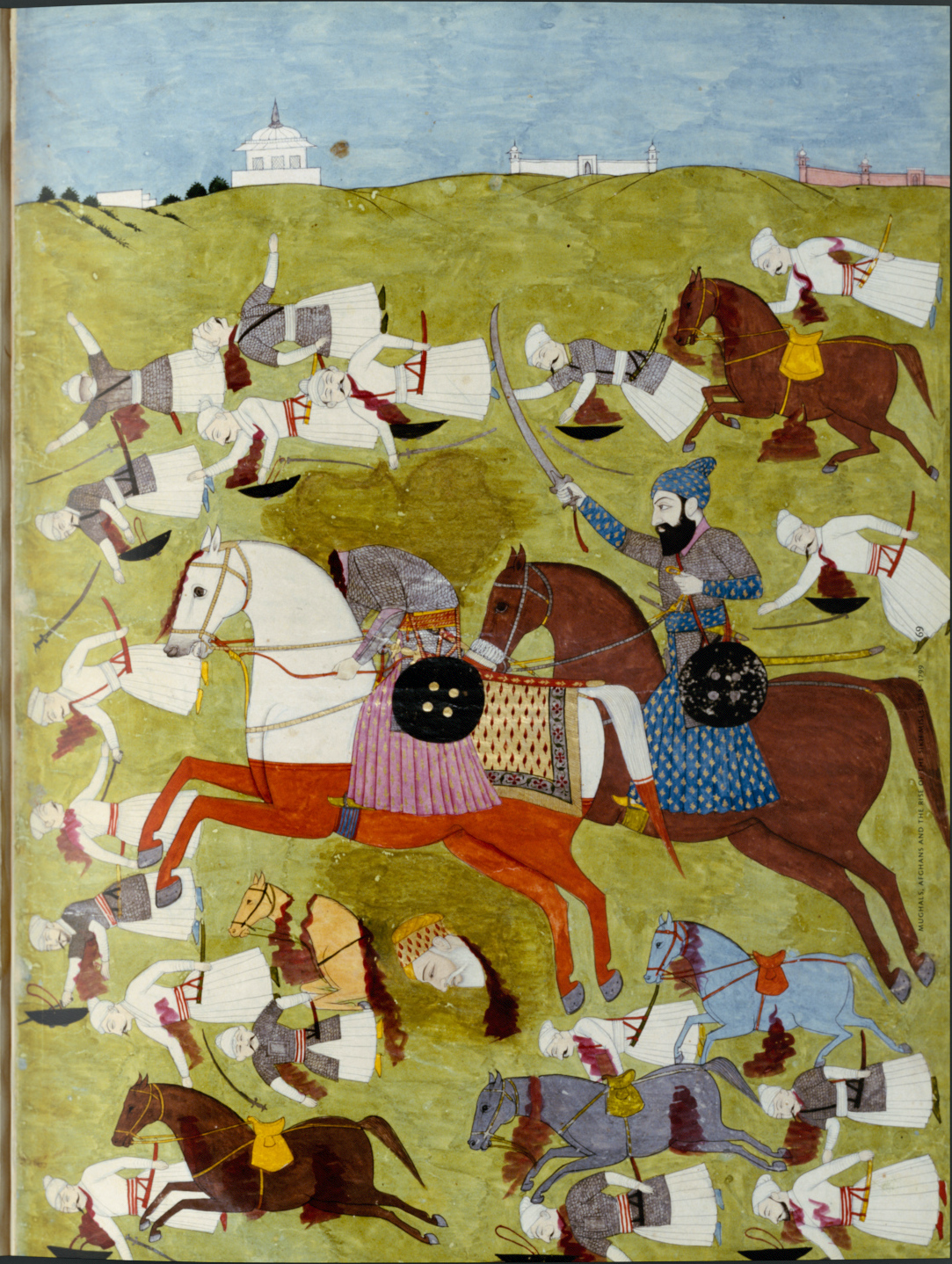
- Illustrated folio of ‘Tawarikh-i Jahandar Shah’, Awadh or Lucknow, ca.1770, showing the climax of the Battle of Sirhind fought in 1710
Date	12 May 1710
Location	A village named Chappar Chiri near Sahibzada Ajit Nagar (Mohali)
Result	Sikh victory

Belligerents
First Sikh State: Jats	Mughal Empire

Commanders and leaders
Banda Singh Bahadur: Baj Singh; Binod Singh; Fateh Singh	Wazir Khan (Sirhind) †: Sher Muhammad Khan †; Khwaja Ali Khan †; Sucha Nand †

Units involved
25,000-30,000 (Note: Ganda Singh claims that the 70,000 figure to be an exaggeration.)	5,000–6,000 cavalry 7,000–8,000 musketeers and archers 100 elephants 24 cannons 5,000–8,000 Ghazis; Total 18,000–25,000

Casualties and losses
Unknown	Wazir Khan (Sirhind) was killed by Fateh Singh. Sucha Nand beheaded by Banda Singh

The Battle of Chappar Chiri, also called Battle of Sirhind, was fought between Mughal Empire and the Sikhs on 12 May 1710 at Chappar Chiri, located 20 kilometers from Sirhind.

== Background ==
The Sikhs were planning to wage dharamyudh against the city of Sirhind, its regions deputy-governor Wazir Khan and his chief-clerk Sucha Nand, to avenge Mughal oppression and the execution of the two young children of Guru Gobind Singh. Some prominent towns on the way to Sirhind were captured and plundered including Sonepat, Kaithal, Samana, Shahabad, Mustafabad and Sadhaura by Baba Banda Singh Bahadur's troops as they could provide military assistance to the Mughal government of Sirhind. The number of plunderers also amassed, who were looking forward to prey upon the riches within the walls of Sirhind and followed Baba Banda Singh and his troops on the march to Sirhind. Both the troops of Baba Banda Singh and Wazir Khan faced each other at a village called Chappar Chiri.

== Pre-battle maneuvers ==
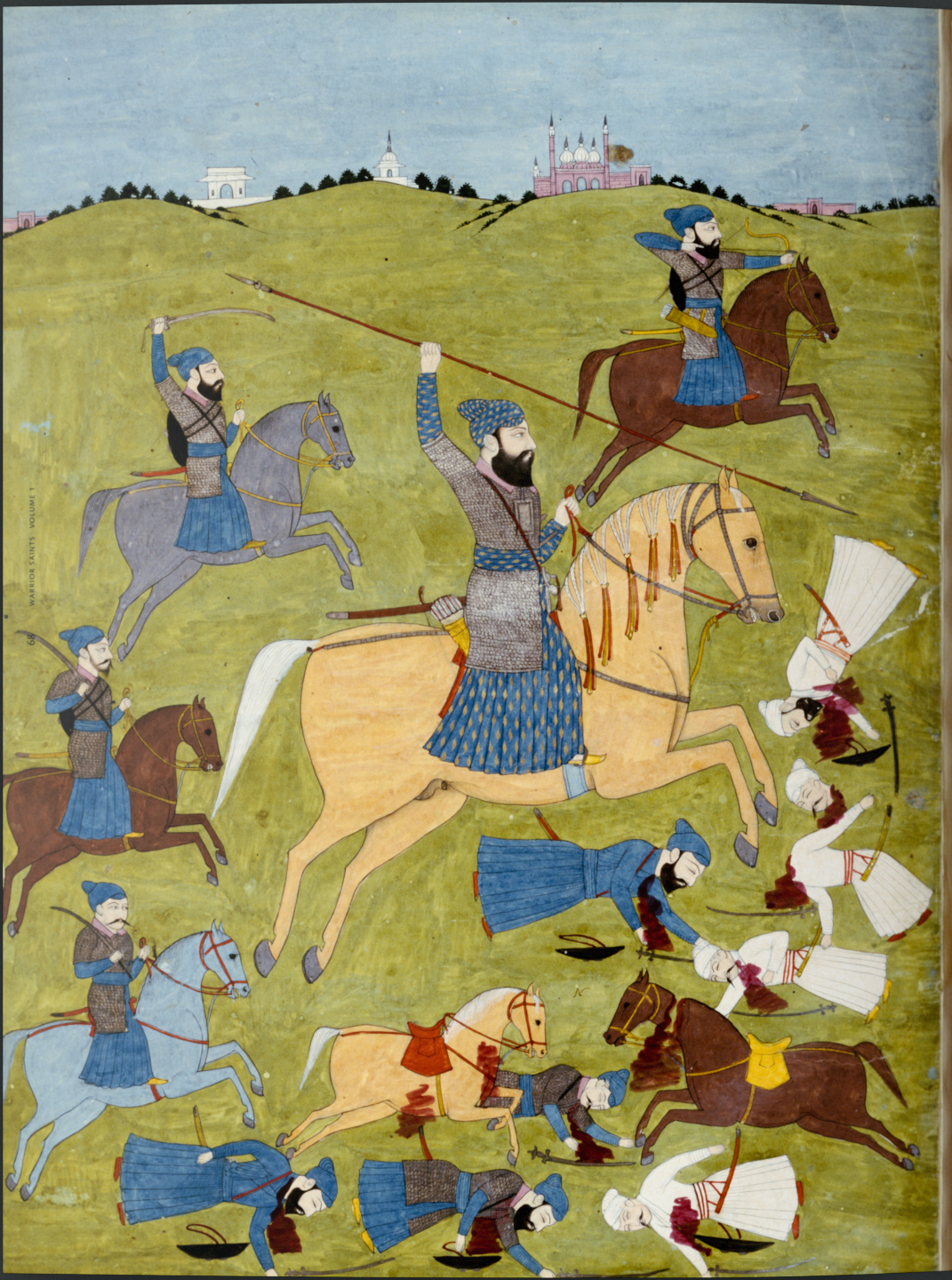
Sikh cavalry charge during the battle, ca.1770 illustrated manuscript

Before the battle began, Wazir Khan and Sucha Nand sent Sucha Nand's nephew with 1000 men to Baba Banda Singh Bahadur in a plot to deceive the Sikhs, by falsely claiming to have deserted the Mughals and to join the Sikhs for their cause. Wazir Khan had a large well-armed army, which included the Ghazis, along with a number of artillery, musketeers, and war elephants. Khan's army was larger than 20,000. On the other hand, Banda Singh's army was ill-equipped with long spears, arrows, swords, without artillery and elephants and insufficient amount of horses. According to Ganda Singh, Banda's army consisted of three classes of men where the first class were the devoted Sikhs imbued to wage just war against the enemies of their country and religion, the second being the paid recruited soldiers sent by the chieftains of the Phul family, who sympathized with Banda Singh's cause. The third were the irregulars who were professional robbers and bandits, eager to seize the opportunity to plunder the city. They were also the most unreliable allies as they would desert when fearing a sign of defeat. Hari Ram Gupta writes that Banda's army consisted of three groups, the first being Sikhs fighting purely to punish Wazir Khan, the second being Sikhs intent on plundering and punishing enemies of their faith. The third being Hindu Jats, Gujars and Rajputs intent on plunder alone.

== Battle ==
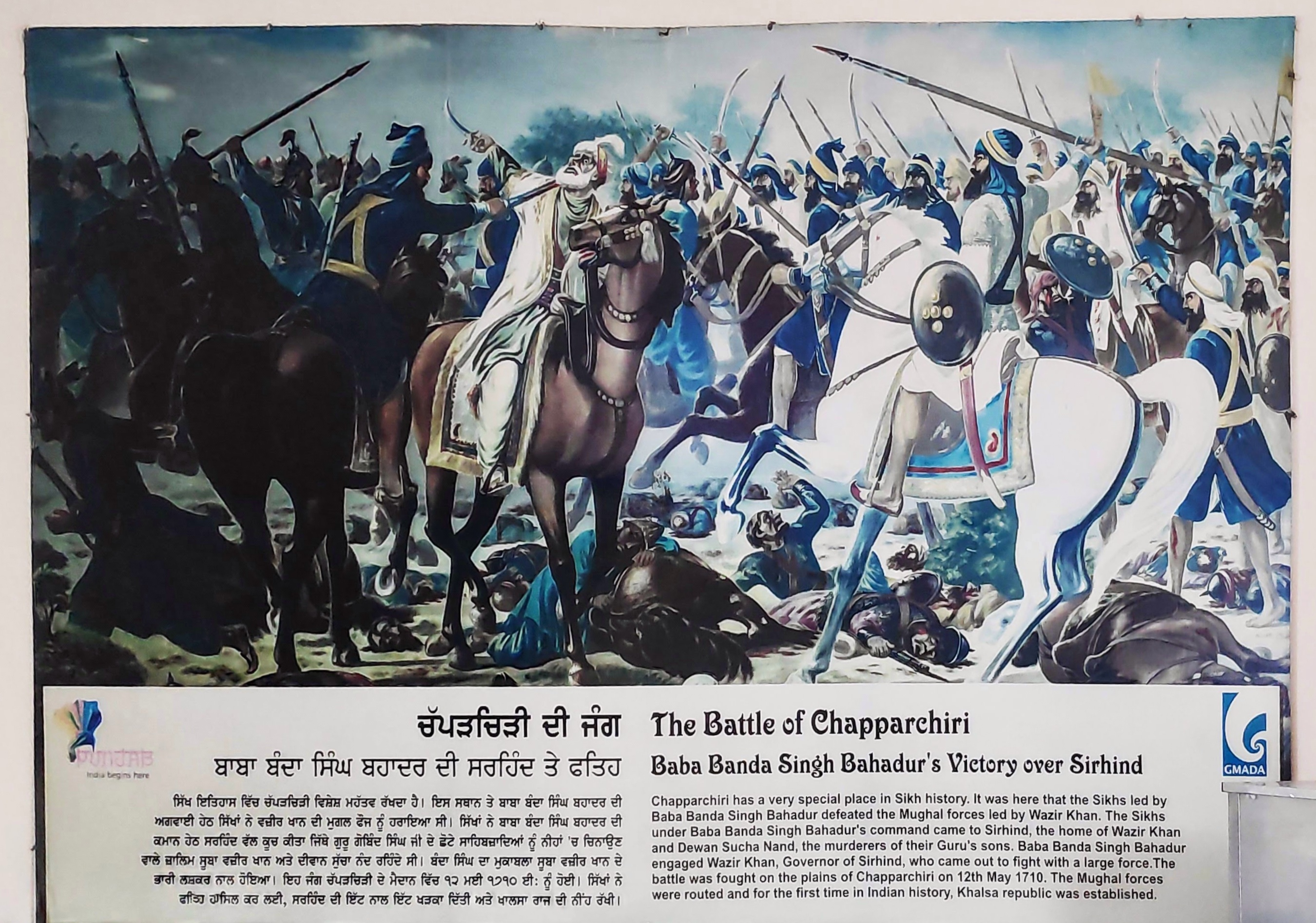
20th century painting of the battle

Upon the firing of artillery by the Mughal army, the third class of Banda's army, consisting of bandits and irregulars fled, and soon after Sucha Nand's nephew along with his 1000 men took to flight as well. Banda Singh Bahadur was waiting for the right time with 1/3 of his army. When the information came that the bandits had fled. To encourage his army, Banda Singh himself rushed into the battle, severely attacking the imperial army, leading to many Mughal soldiers being killed, including Sher Muhammad Khan and Khwaja Ali of Malerkotla. Wazir Khan was also killed which led to the defeat and retreat of his army to Sirhind, where many were killed during Banda's pursuit of them.

== Aftermath ==
After the defeat of the Mughal army at the battle of Chappar Chiri, the Siege of Sirhind took place where the Sikhs besieged, stormed, plundered and razed the city of Sirhind.

== Popular culture ==
- A Punjabi animated film Chaar Sahibzaade: Rise of Banda Singh Bahadur which was released on 11 November 2016 depicts the battle of Chappar Chiri.
- Fateh Burj is the highest victory tower constructed in remembrance of this battle.

== See also ==
- Fateh Burj, monument built in commemoration of this battle
- Battle of Sonipat
- Chappar Chiri
