= Chappar Chiri =

Landran Punjab, India

Chappar Chiri Chappar Chiri Fateh
- Location within Punjab
- Coordinates: 30°42′N 76°40′E
- Country: India
- State: Punjab
- District: Mohali
- Established: 1709
- Founder: Banda Singh Bahadur
- Named for: Battle of Chappar Chiri

Government
  - Type: Punjab Mohali GMADA

Languages
  - Official: Punjabi
- Time zone: UTC+5:30 (IST)

Chapar Chiri is a small village located in the Mohali district of Punjab, India. It is near Mohali city and is 14 km west of Chandigarh.

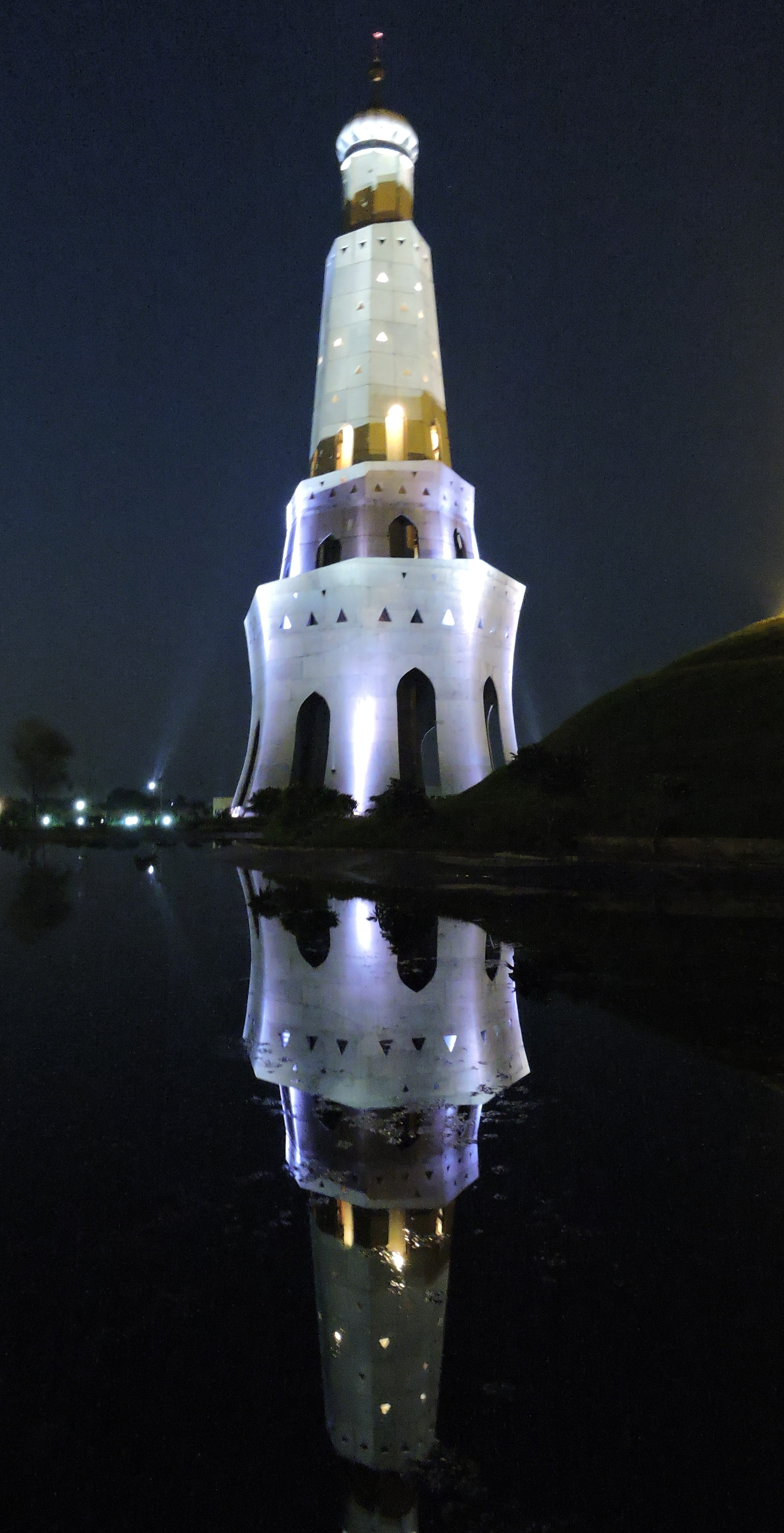
Banda Singh Bahadur War Memorial The village is famous because it contains the tallest victory tower in India

The village is famous due to Fateh Burj (English: The Victory Tower) is the tallest victory tower (minar) in the country. The 420 ft tower is dedicated to the establishment of Sikh rule in Punjab in 1709. It is also known as Baba Banda Singh Bahadur War Memorial. It was here that Banda Singh Bahadur, one of the most respected Sikh generals, won a decisive battle against Wazir Khan, the Mughal Governor of Sirhind.[3]
