= Fateh Burj =

Prominent tourist site in Punjab and the tallest victory tower in India

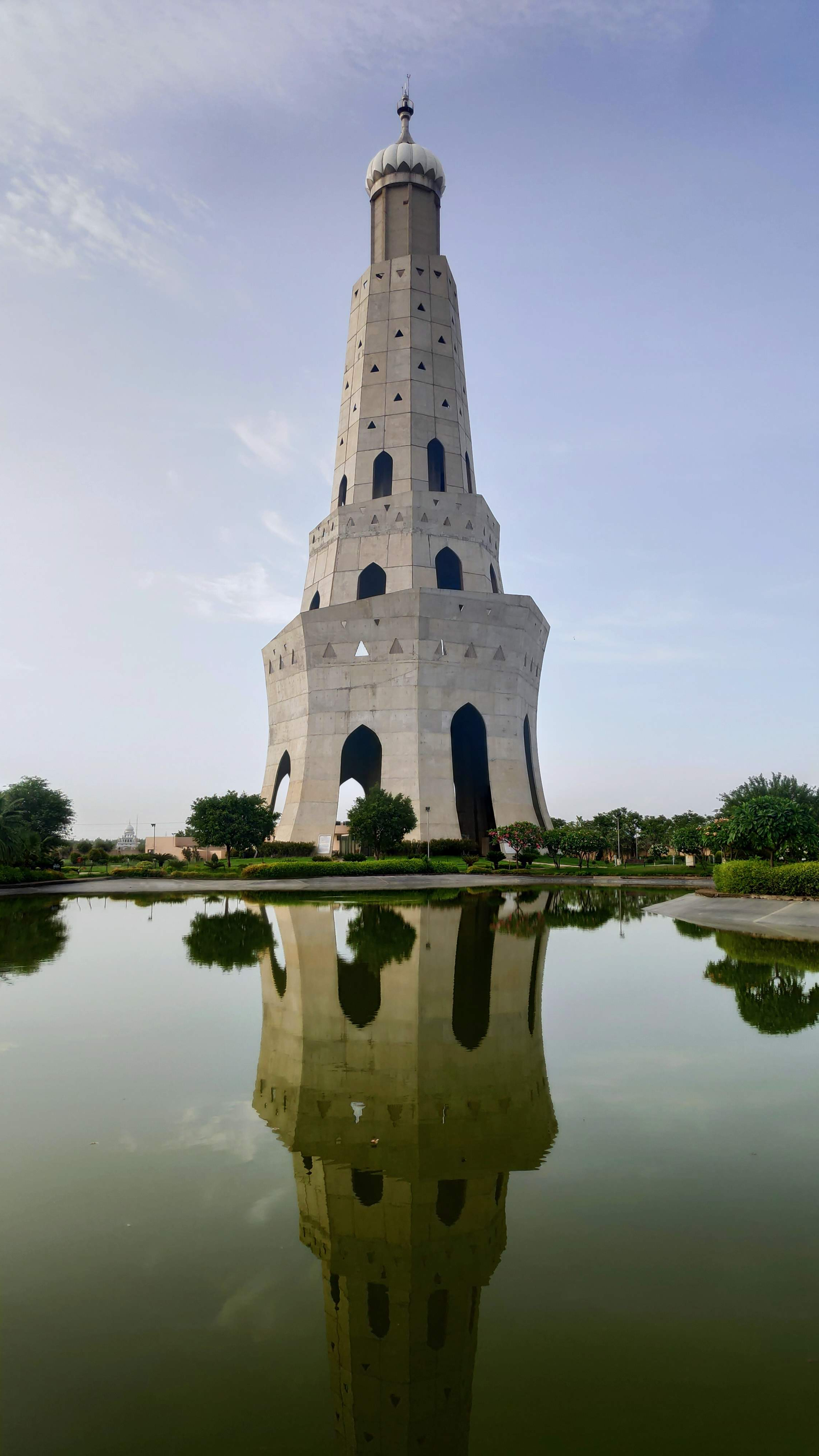
- The Fateh Burj in Punjab
- Established: 30 November 2011
- Location: Chappar Chiri, Mohali, Punjab, India
- Coordinates: 30.70314°N 76.66792°E
- Type: Tower
- Collections: Historical memories of Banda Singh Bahadur Ji
- Architect: French-Sikh Architecture
- Owner: Government of Punjab

The Fateh Burj (English: The Victory Tower) is a victory tower in India, is situated in the historical village of Chappar Chiri in the Mohali district of the Indian state of Punjab. Completed in 2011, it is the tallest victory tower in India. The 328-foot (100 m) tower is dedicated to establishment of the Sikh Misls in a large part of Punjab in 1711. It is situated in Banda Singh Bahadur Road. It is situated just outside Mohali, 140 kilometres from Amritsar and 20 km from Sirhind. It was here that Banda Singh Bahadur, one of the most respected and great Sikh warriors, won a decisive battle against Wazir Khan, commander of the Mughal army.

== History ==
In 1710, Banda Singh Bahadur won the battle against Wazir Khan, who commanded the Mughal army at Chappar Chiri. Wazir Khan had planned to stop the march of the Sikh army led by Banda Singh Bahadur to Sirhind. He established his capital at Lohgarh.

== Gallery ==
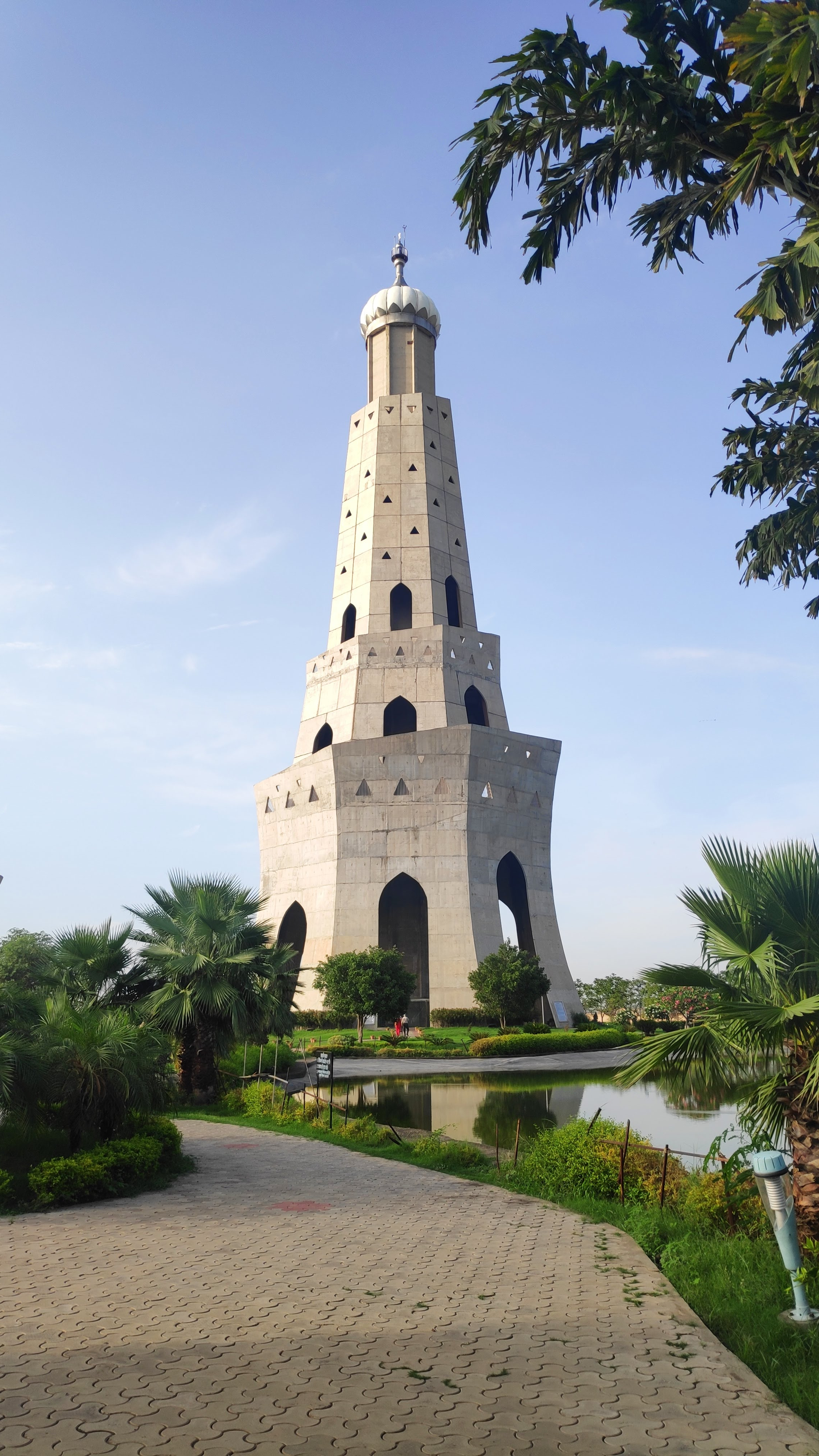
View of the tower from the park surrounding it

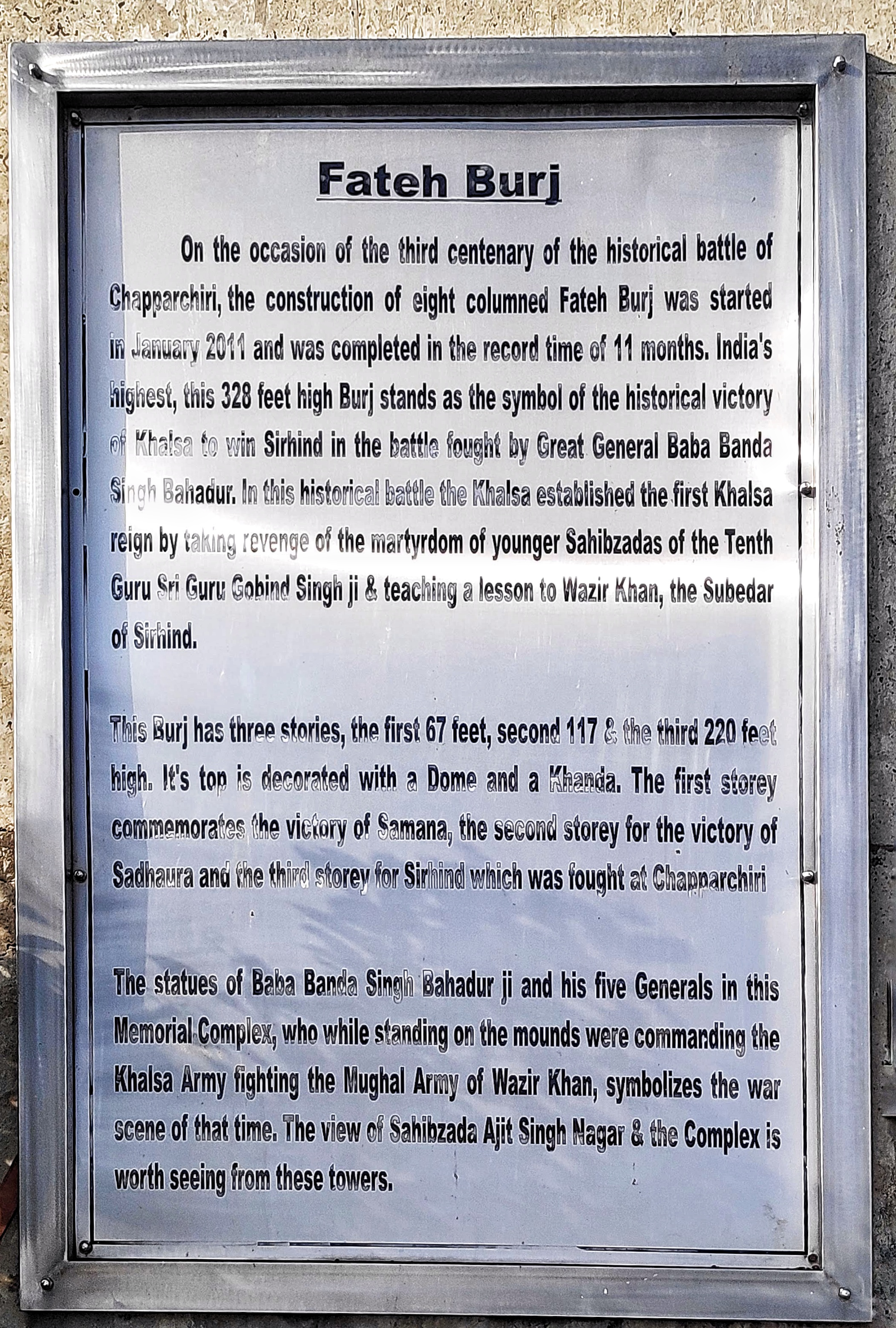
Plaque about the tower

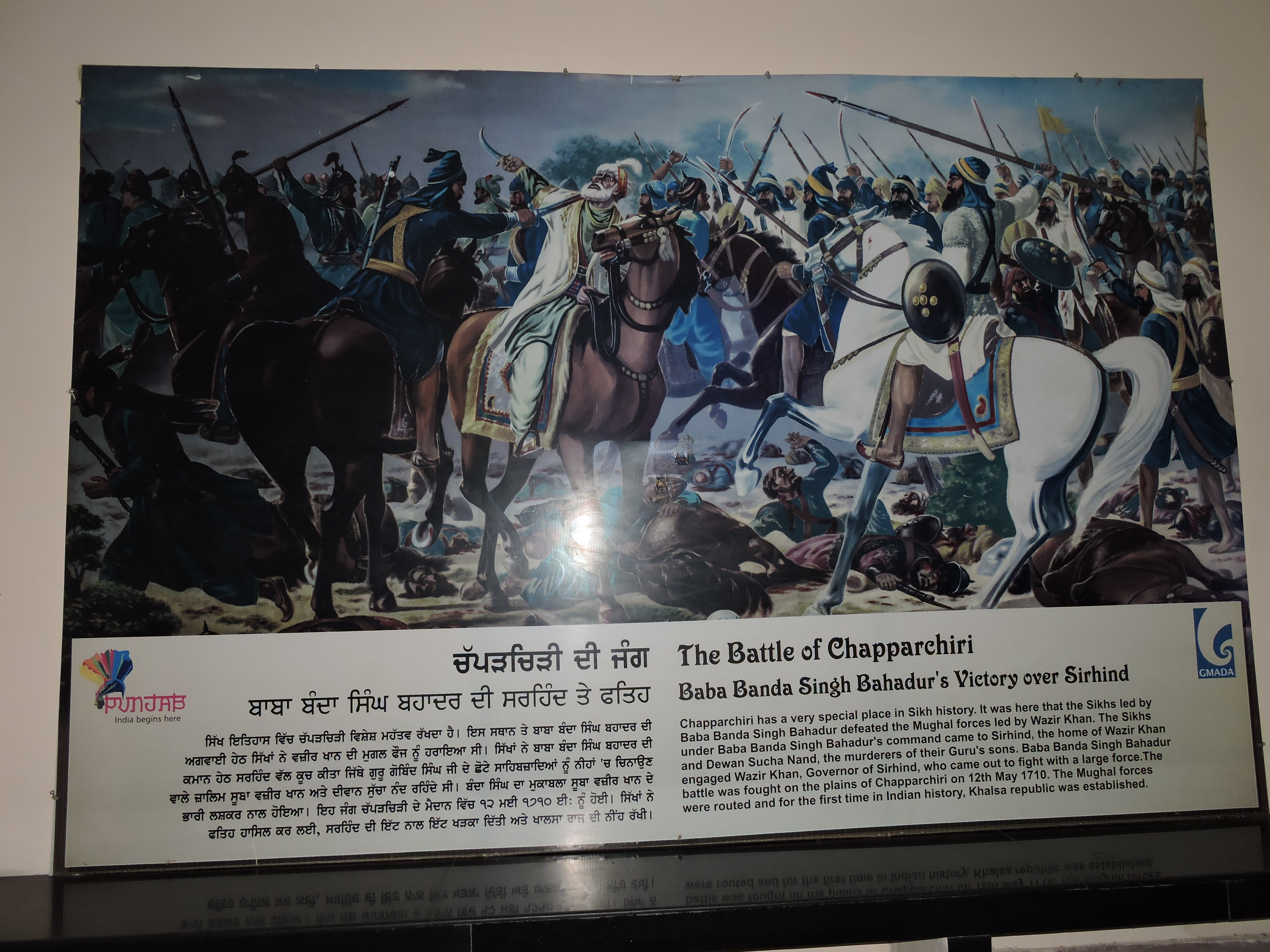
Historical description of Fateh Burj

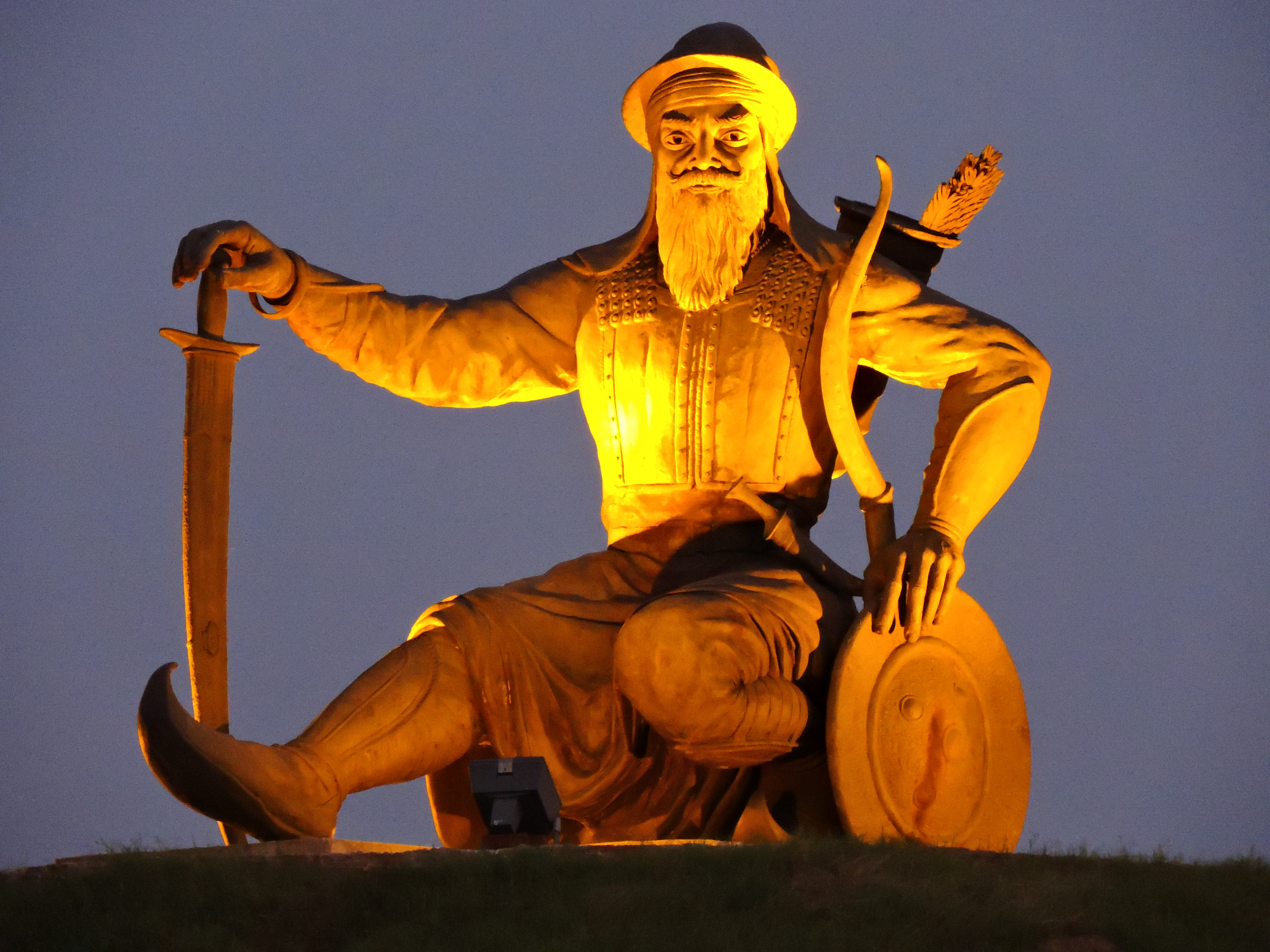
Statue of Baba Banda Singh Bahadur at Chappar Chiri

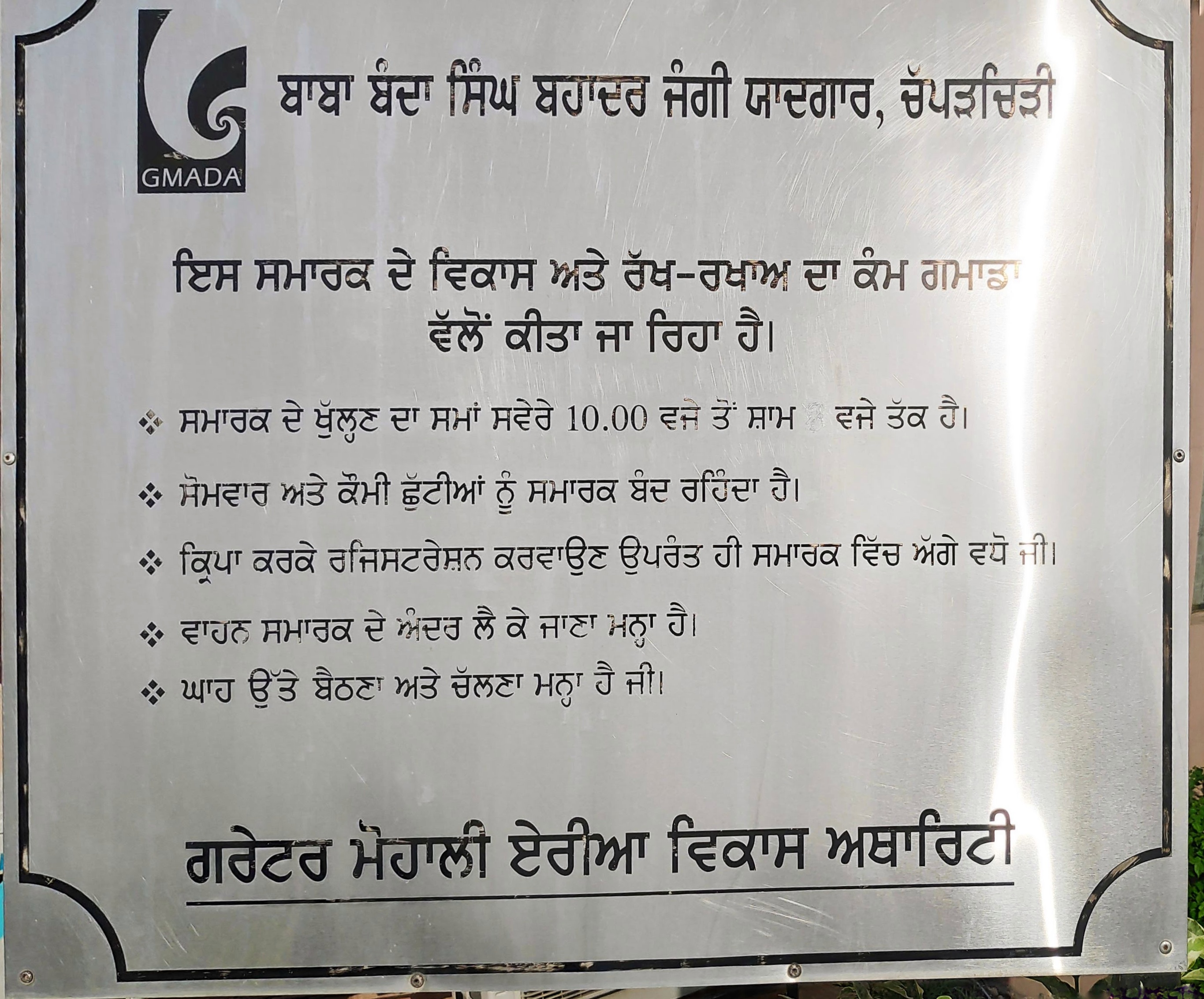
Baba Banda Bahadur Smarak Note

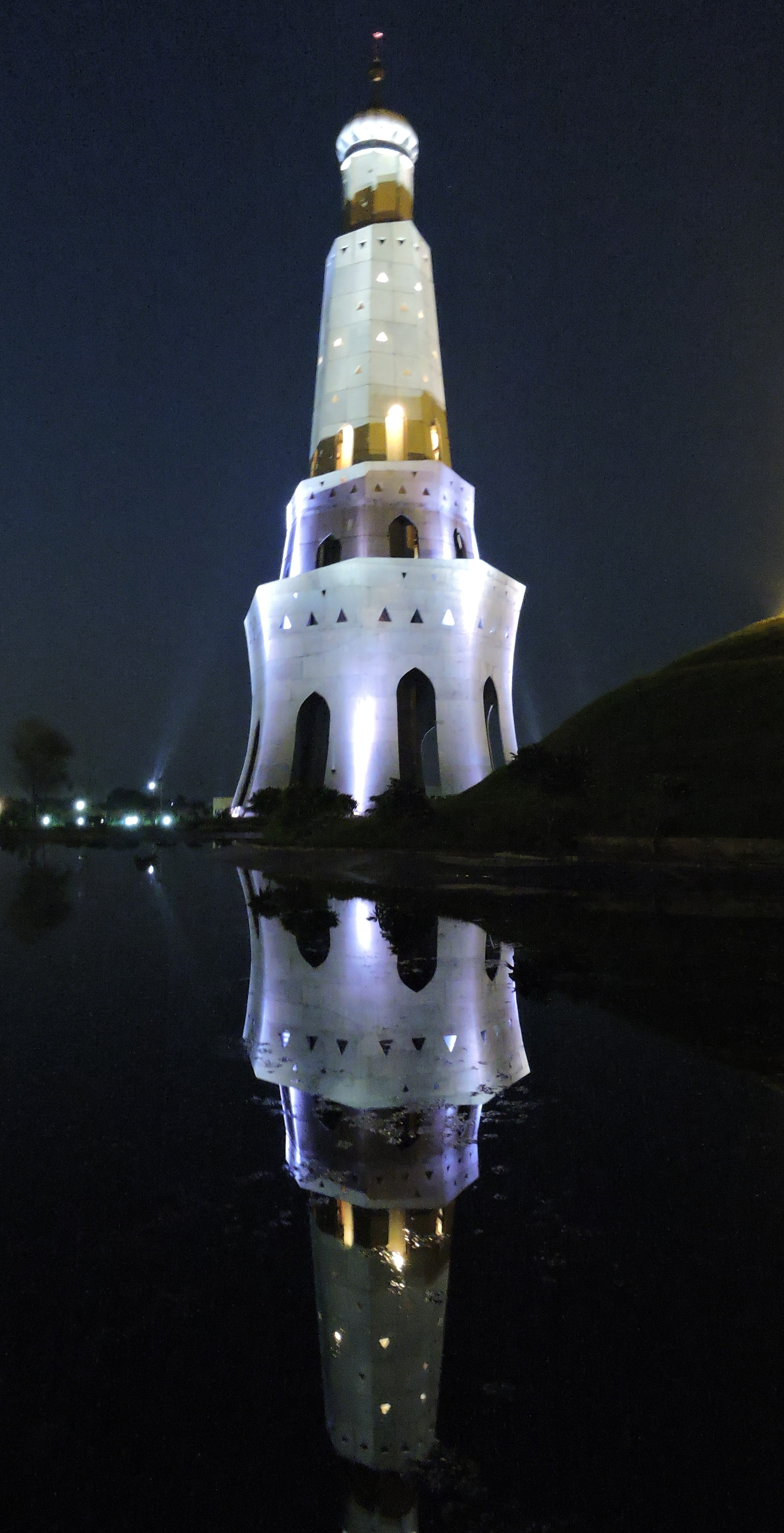
Night view of Fateh Burj

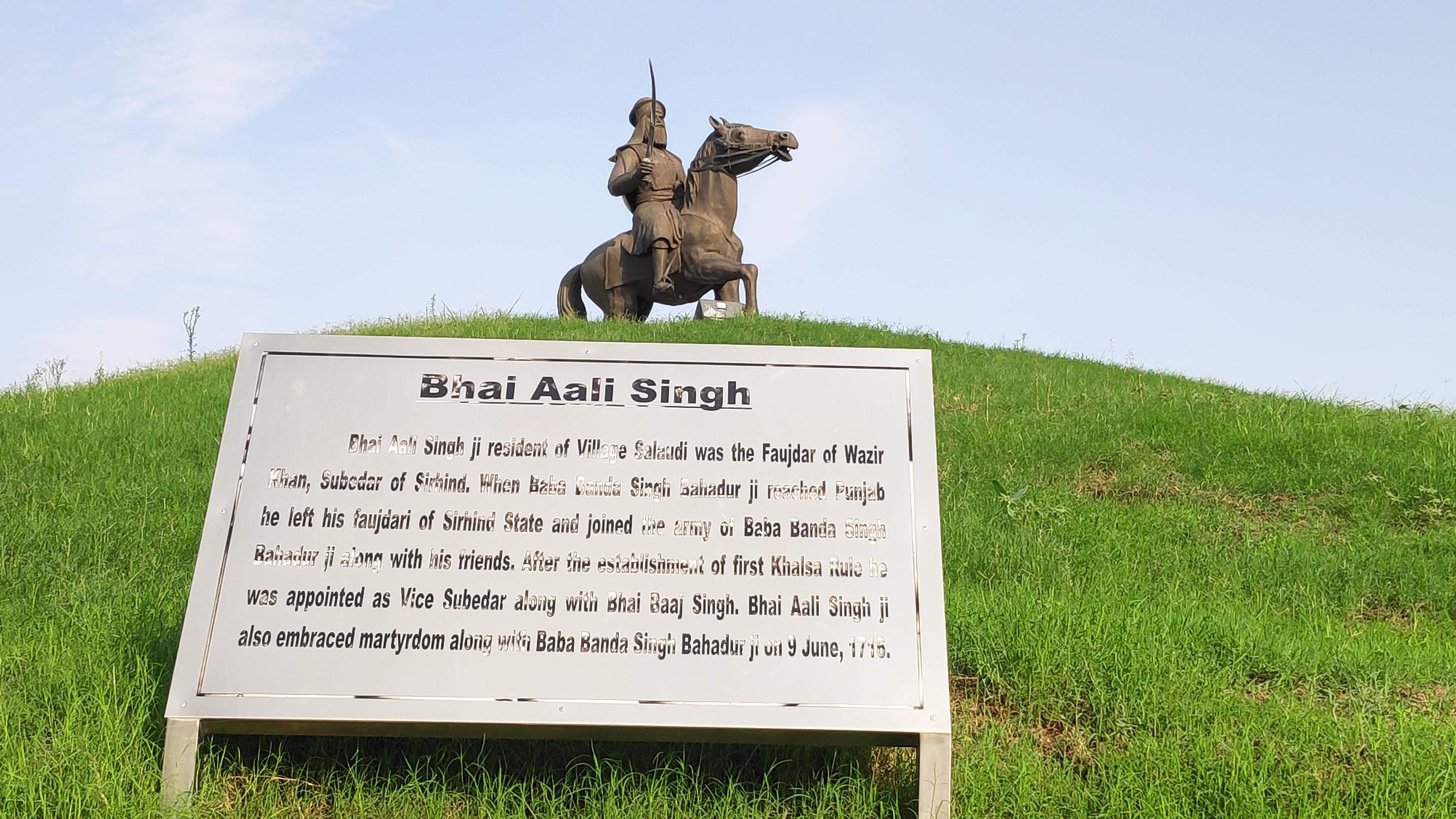
Bhai Aali Singh statue on Fatehburj Sahib

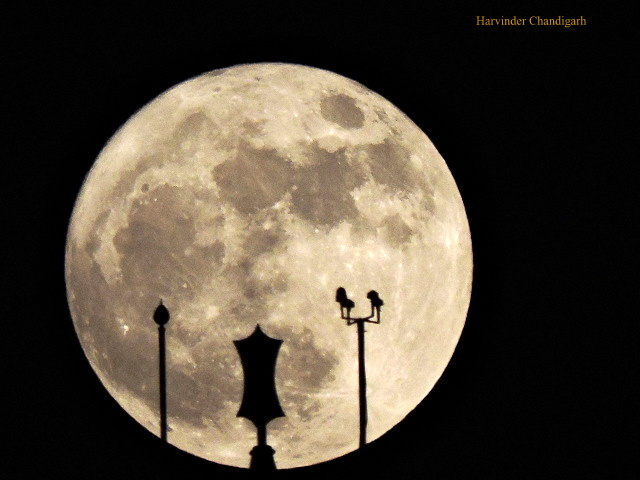
The 14 November 2016 supermoon and the Sikh religion's iconic symbol Khanda of Fateh Burj visible in its centre

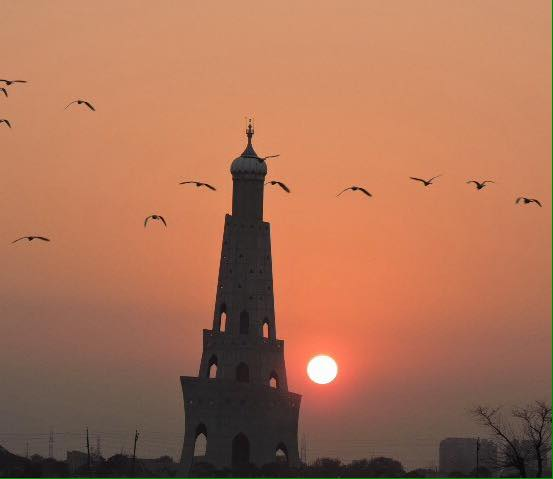
Fateh Burj, village Chappar Chiri, Mohali, Punjab

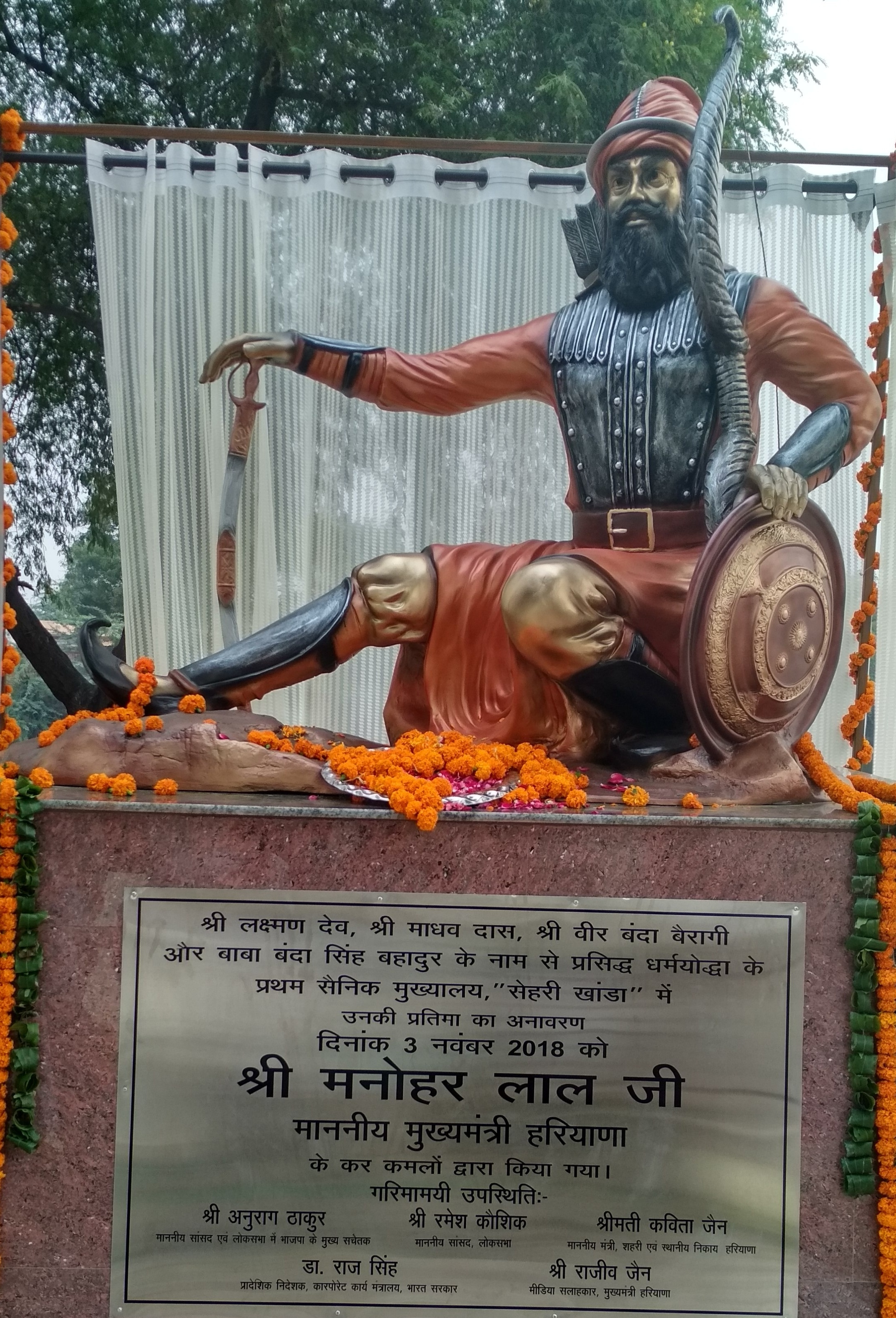
Banda Bahadur Memorial in Khanda, Sonipat

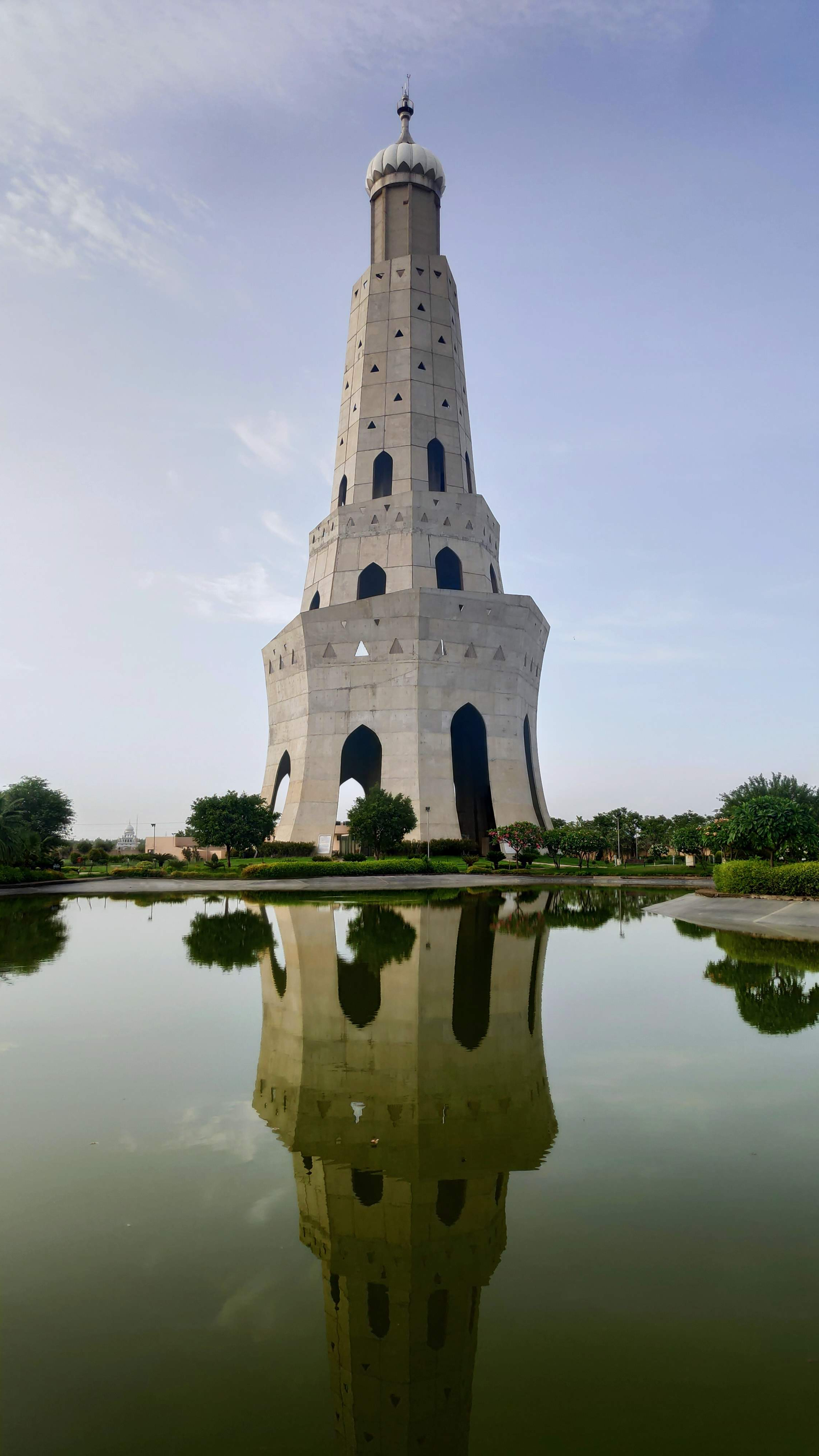
Fateh Burj Sahib Minar

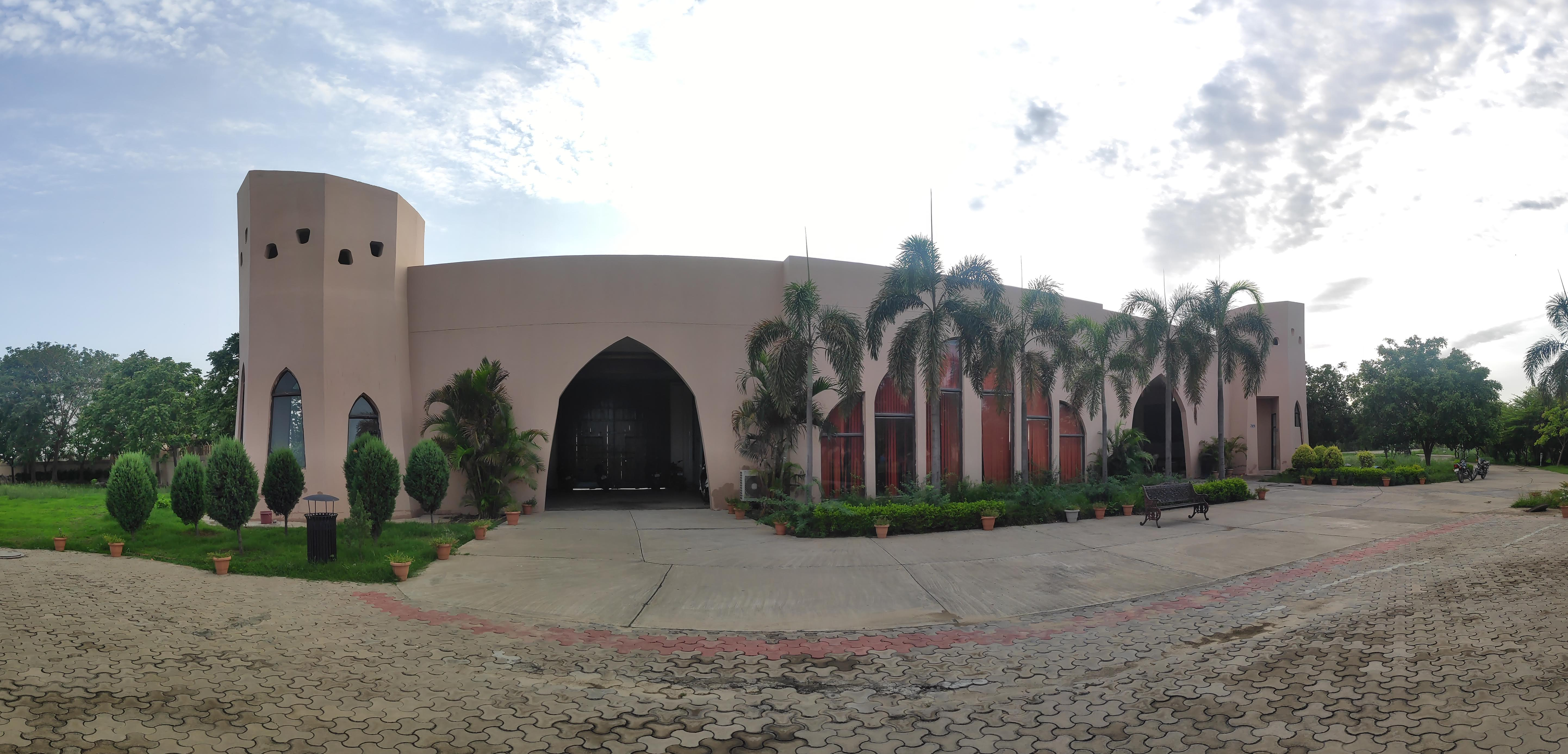
Panoromic View of Fatehburj Sahib gate

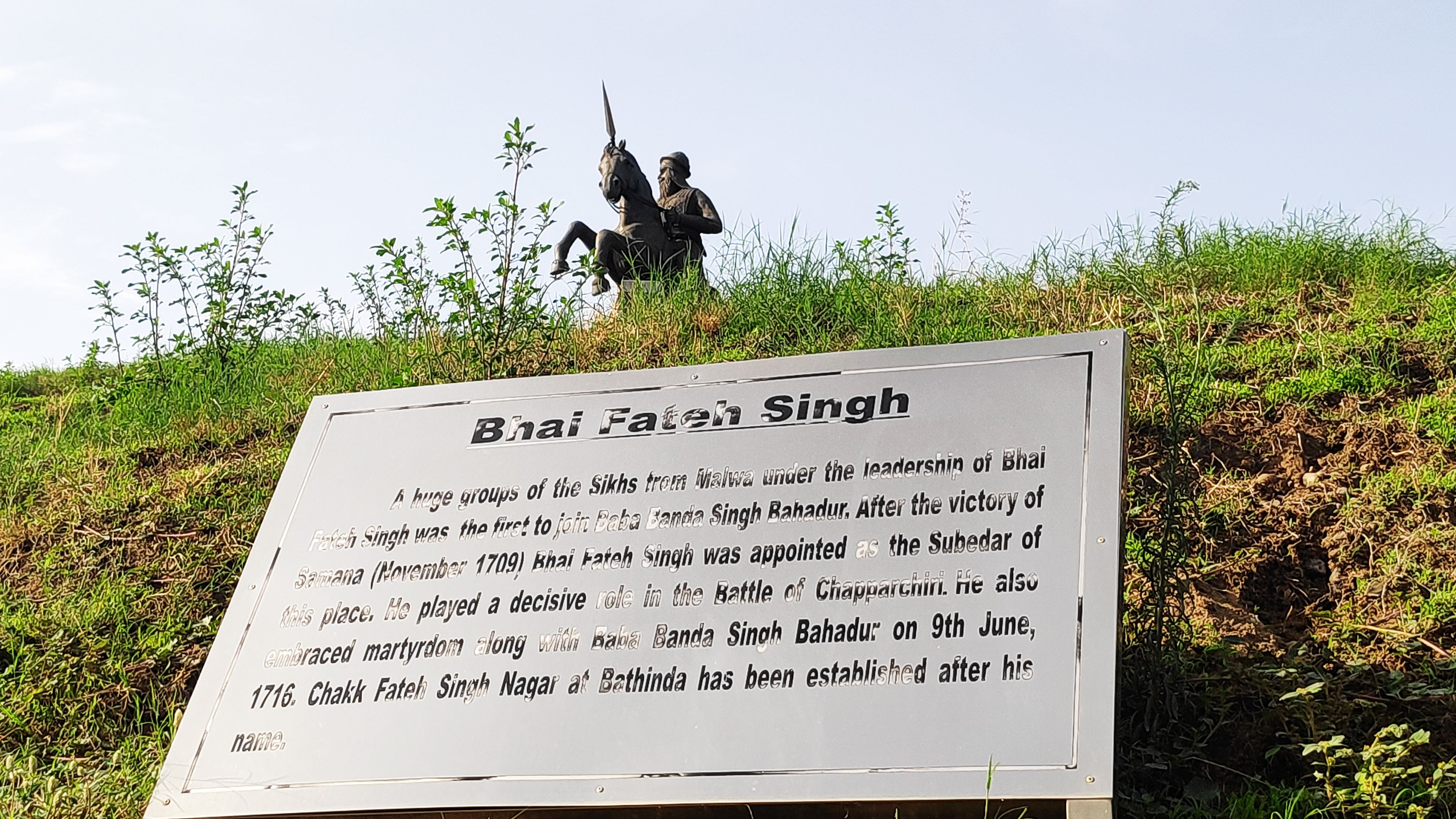
Bhai Fateh Singh statue on Fatehburj Sahib

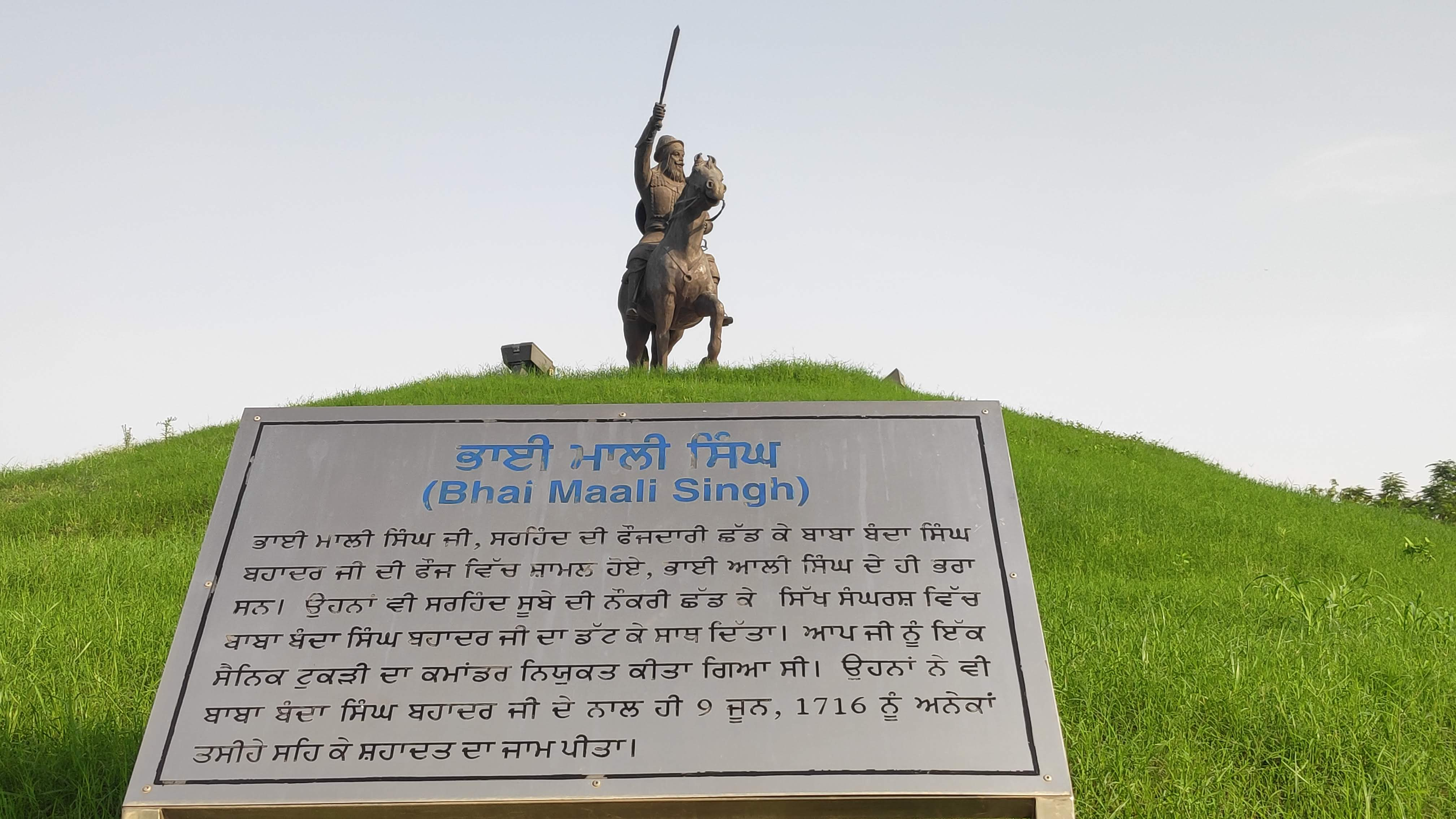
Bhai Maali singh statue on Fatehburj Sahib

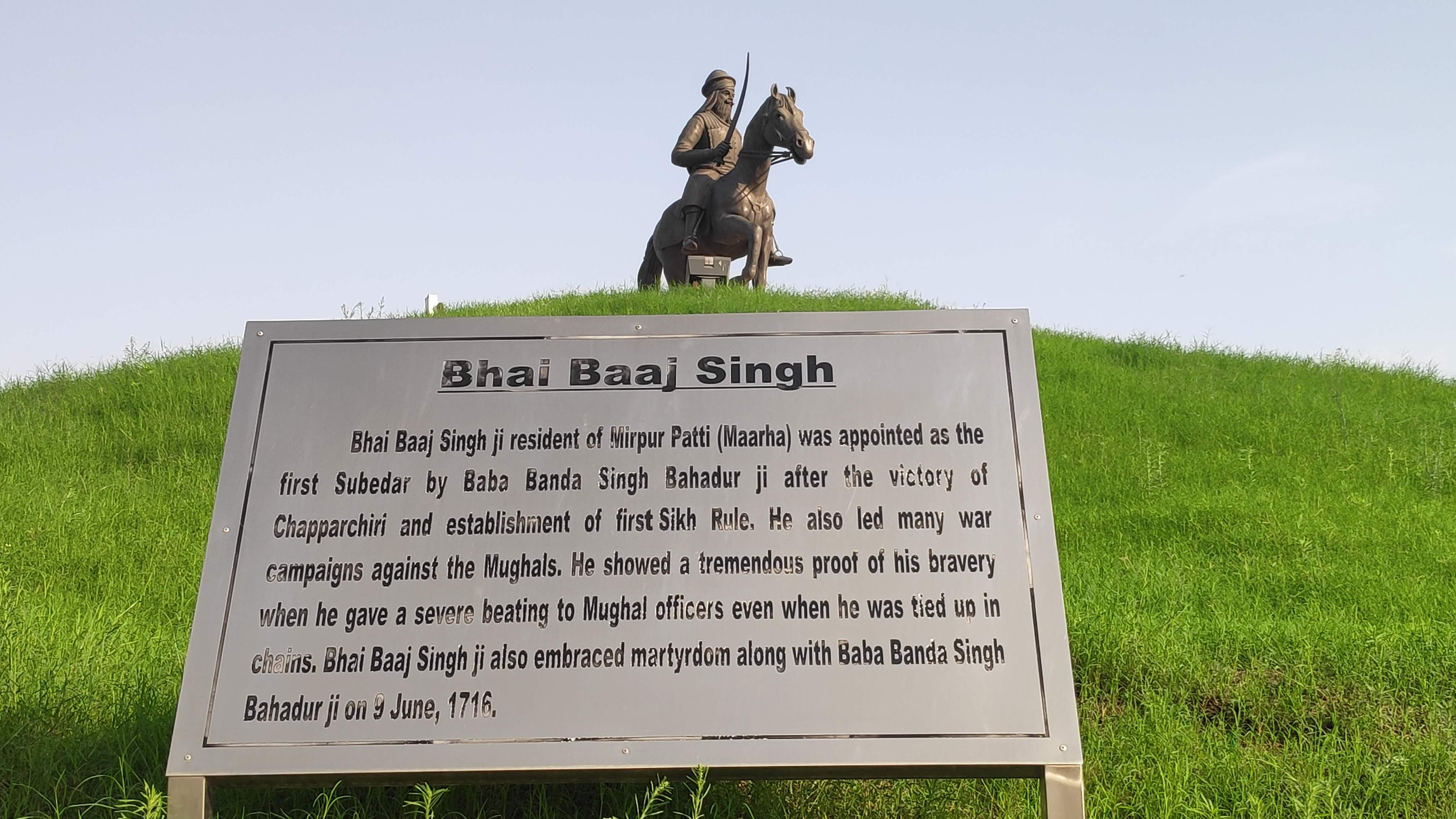
Bhai Baaj singh statue on Fatehburj Sahib

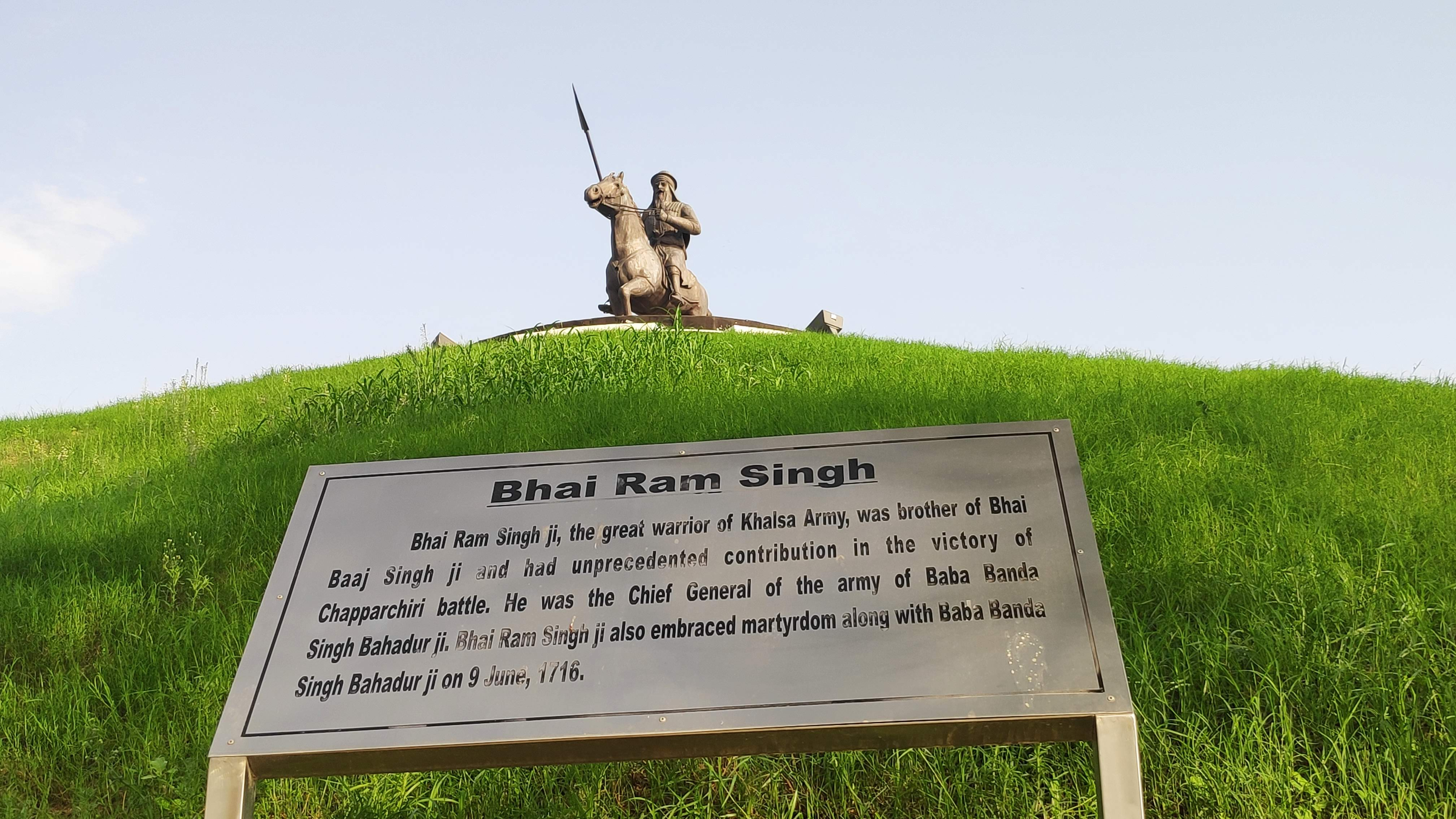
Bhai Ram Singh statue on Fatehburj

== See also ==
- Khanda museum
