= Battle of Lohgarh =

The Battle of Lohgarh may refer to:

- First Battle of Lohgarh (1710)
- Second Battle of Lohgarh (1712-1713)
