= Baj Singh =

Sikh warrior (died 1716)

Baba Baj Singh Bahadur
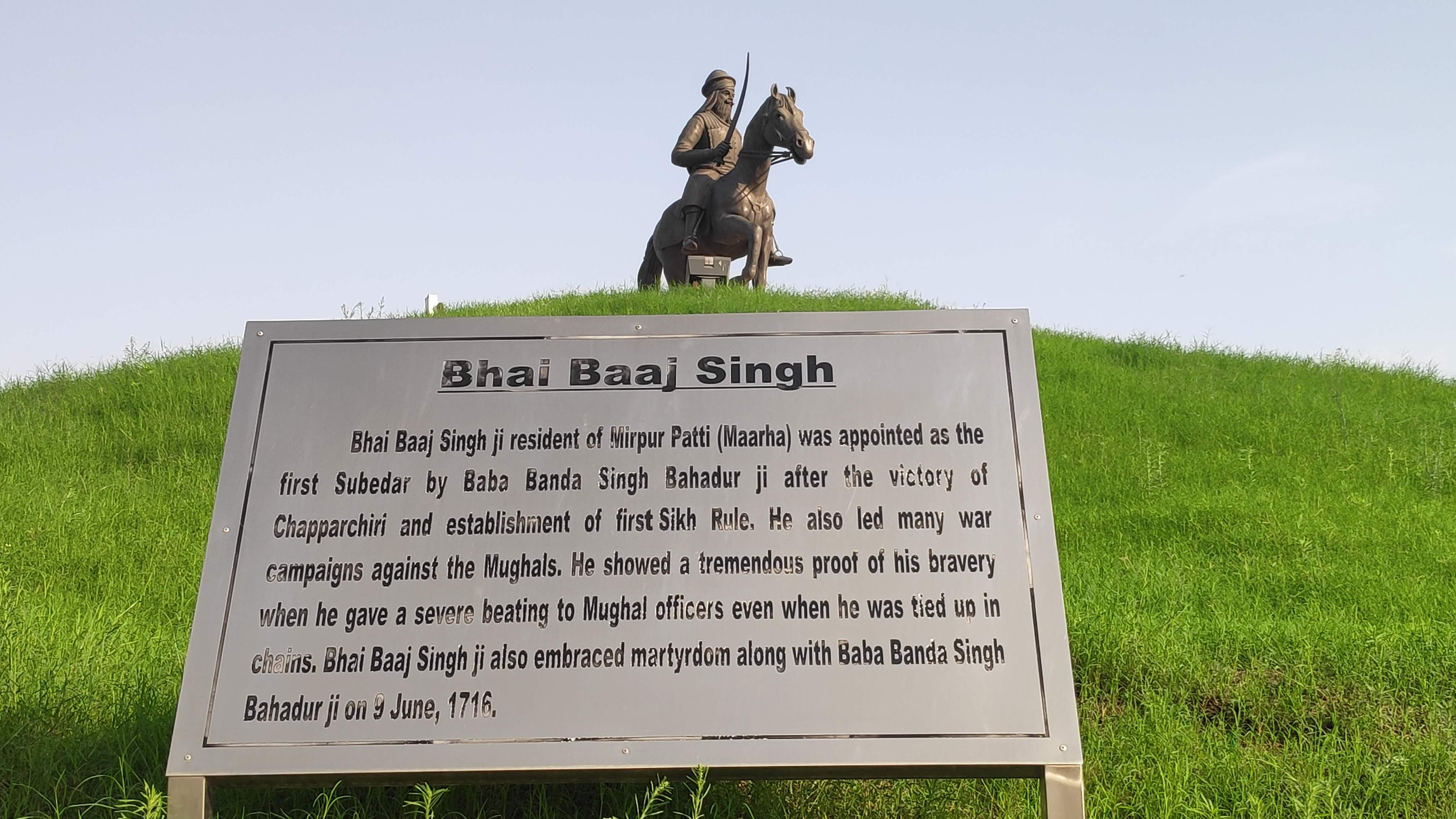
- Bhai Baj Singh statue at Fatehburj Sahib
- Born: Baj Singh Bal
- Died: 9 June 1716; Delhi, Delhi Subah, Mughal Empire
- Cause of death: Execution

Baba Baj Singh (died 9 June 1716; his first name is alternatively spelt as Baaj), also known as Baj Bahadur, was a Sikh general, governor, scholar and martyr from present-day India. Baj Singh was the cousin of Bhai Mani Singh.

== Biography ==
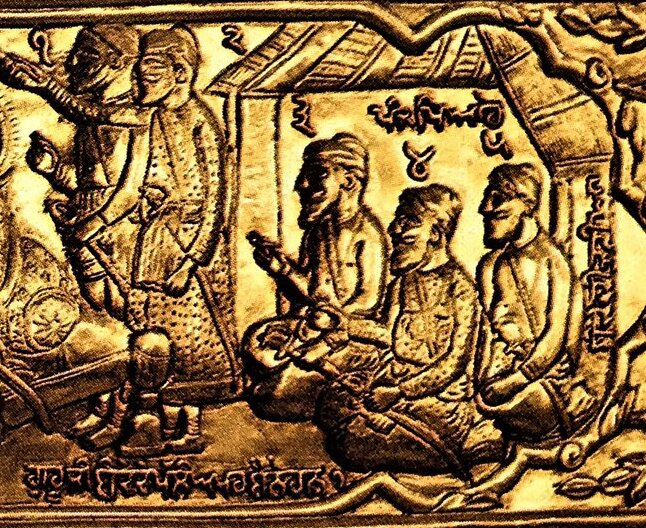
Binod Singh, Kahan Singh, Baj Singh, Daya Singh, and Ram Singh depicted as a Panj Piare group from a gilded panel from Takht Hazur Sahib, Nanded

Baj Singh's family was native to Mirpur Patti, a village in Amritsar district of the Punjab. He was part of a Panj Piare quintet commanded, by Guru Gobind Singh, to accompany Banda Singh Bahadur and provide him counsel on his northwards conquest of Sirhind.

=== Execution ===
He was executed on 9 June 1716 on the outskirts of Delhi, on the bank of the Yamuna river along with his seven brothers and Banda Singh Bahadur.

== Battles fought by Baj Singh ==
- Battle of Sonipat
- Battle of Samana
- Battle of Sadhaura
- Battle of Chappar Chiri
- Battle of Brahampur
- Battle of Jammu
- Battle of Jalalabad (1710)
- Battle of Lohgarh
- Battle of Gurdas Nangal or Siege of Gurdaspur
