= Battle of Samana =

1709 conflict

- Part of Mughal-Sikh Wars
Date	26 November 1709
Location	Samana
Result	Sikh victory Establishment of the First Sikh State

Belligerents
Khalsa: Peasants; Dahiyas of Khanda	Mughal Empire

Commanders and leaders
Banda Singh Bahadur	Wazir Khan

Strength
3,000 Cavalry; 5,000 Infantry; 8,000 Total	10,000+

Casualties and losses
Unknown	10,000 Mughal killed

The Battle of Samana was fought between the Khalsa under the leadership of Banda Singh Bahadur and the Mughal Government of Samana in 1709. Following the battle, Banda Singh Bahadur shook the administration of Delhi.

== Background ==
Samana was a town where executioners Sayyed Jalal-ud-din, Shashal Beg and Bashal Beg lived. Sayyed Jalal-ud-din was responsible for the execution of Sikh Guru Teg Bahadur, whereas, Shashal Beg and Bashal Beg were responsible for the execution of Guru Gobind Singh's two children.

== Battle ==
The Sikhs had 3,000 horsemen and 5,000 foot-soldiers. The commander of Samana had his town well defended. Banda advanced with speed during the night and reached the gates of Samana by the dawn of November 26. Once the gate-keepers were killed the whole army charged into the town. The executioners of Guru Tegh Bahadur and his grandchildren were killed. The peasantry of the neighborhood joined Banda Singh's army of 8,000, looking to wreak vengeance upon their expropriating zamindars (feudal lords) and together with Banda and his army entered the town from all sides, killed thousands of the city's inhabitants and razed the town. Nearly 10,000 Muslims are said to have been massacred in the town and a great amount of wealth was obtained.

== Aftermath ==
After the successful expedition against Samana, Banda Singh Bahadur established the First Sikh State and appointed Fateh Singh as the Governor of Samana. Later, some important towns on the way to Sirhind were plundered, especially as they could provide military assistance to Sirhind. Banda also forcibly took supplies from the villagers and plundered Ambala on the way. The villages of Kunjpura, Ghuram and Thaska were also destroyed by the Sikhs, which were inhabited by Muslim Ranghars, who committed atrocities against the general population.
