= Wazir Khan (Sirhind) =

Mughal nobleman and administrator (1635–1710)

Mirza Askari Wazir Khan میرزا عسکری وزیرخان
- Wazir Khan; Faujdar (Commander); Diwan (Revenue Collector/Commissioner); Sarkar (Deputy-Subahdar/Sub-Governor) (5,000 Mansabi) (4,000 Sawari)
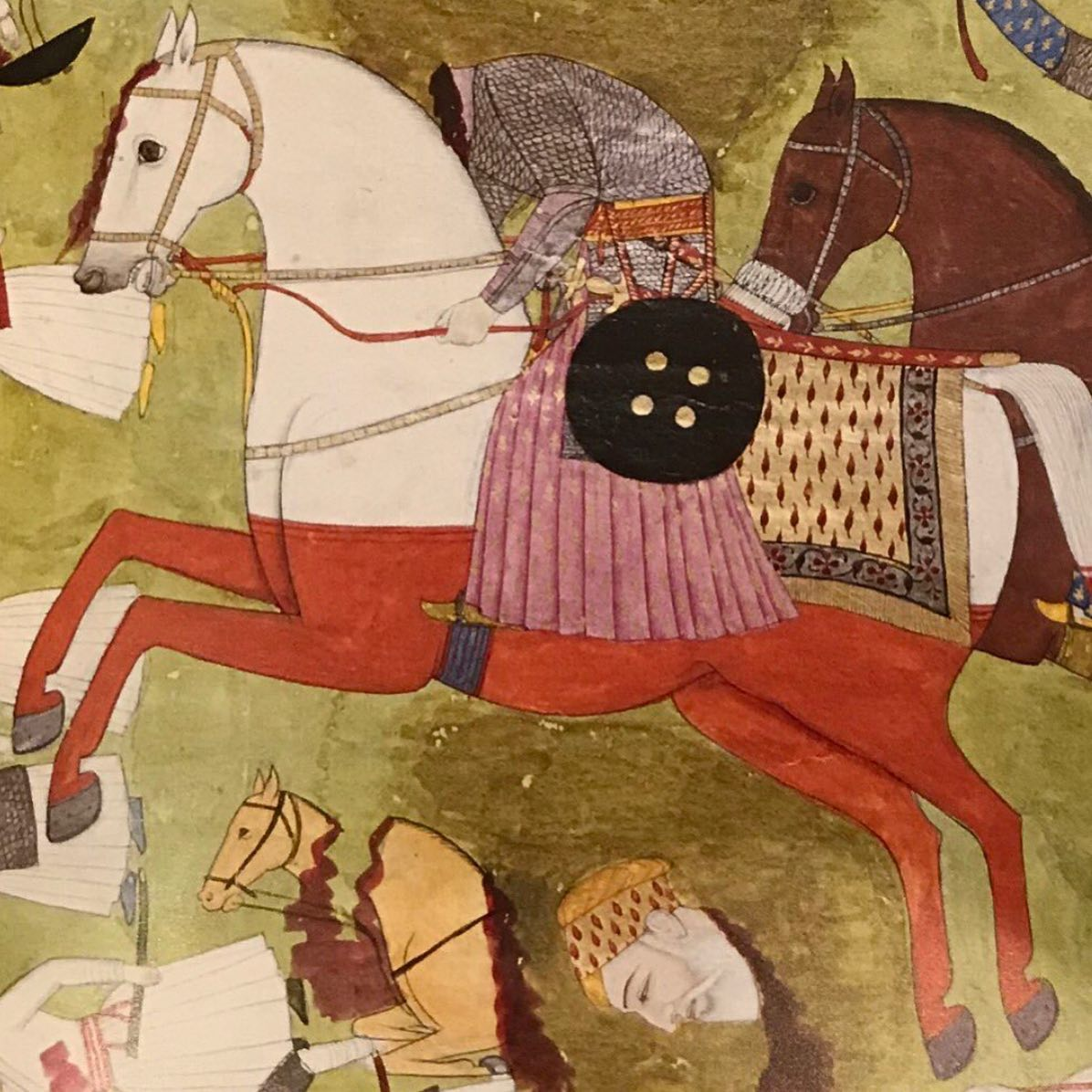
- Depiction of Wazir Khan of Sirhind beheaded during the Battle of Sirhind (1710) from an illustrated folio of ‘Tawarikh-i Jahandar Shah’, Awadh or Lucknow, ca.1770

Sarkar (Deputy-Subahdar/Governor) of Sirhind in Delhi Subah
- Holding Office: (Late 17th-Centuries) – 12 May 1710
- Successor: Baj Singh of Khalsa Fauj
- Padishah (Great Emperor): Alamgir I Shah Alam I
- Subahdar (Senior Officials): Munim Khan II; Ghazi ud-Din Khan Feroze Jung I
- Born: Mirza Askari c. 1635; Kunjpura, Delhi Subah, Mughal Empire
- Died: 12 May 1710 (aged 74–75); Chappar Chiri, Punjab
- Issue: Mirza Tulghan Khan
Names
- Mirza Askari Wazir Khan bin Mirza Zahir Haram Khan
- Farsi: میرزا عسکری وزیرخان بن ظاهر حرم خان
- Father: Mirza Zahir Haram Khan
- Mother: Amina Begum
- Religion: Sunni Islam
- Occupation: Deputy-Governor and Military Commander of the Mughal Empire

Mirza Askari (Persian: میرزا عسکری, c. 1635 – 12 May 1710), better known by his title Wazir Khan, was an Indian nobleman of Persian descent in the Mughal Empire, primarily active in the Punjab. He served as a military commander (faujdar), tax collector (dewan), and deputy governor in the Sirhind region of the Delhi Subah. He was a mansabdar of 5,000 zat (infantry) and 4,000 swars (cavalry).

Wazir Khan administered territory that lay between the Sutlej and Yamuna rivers as the regional deputy governor under such Delhi governors as Munim Khan II and Ghazi ud-Din Khan Feroze Jung I. He is best known for his conflicts with the Sikhs.

Wazir Khan was defeated and killed by the Sikh Khalsa forces under Banda Singh Bahadur on May 12, 1710 during the battle of Chappar Chiri.

== Biography ==
=== Background ===
Mirza Askari was born around 1635 CE. his father was Mirza Zahir Khan, Mirza Askari was the descendant of Wazir Khan Akbar Shahi of Persian descent who originally from Iran, who was the served as Courtrian to the third Mughal Emperor Akbar.

=== Other sources claiming about his origin ===
According to Sikh sources, Mirza Askari (Wazir Khan) was the native of then Kunjpura and Karnal district of modern-day Haryana. other Sikh accounts suggest that Wazir Khan was a distant relative of the Nawabs of Malerkotla, which, if true, would suggest an Afghan origin for him.

=== Administrations ===
He serving as deputy-governor/subahdar in the Sirhind region as Sarkar of all localized administrations, he hold as (Faujder) a military commander and Amin (Dewan) which was referred to as a revenue collector to the under Mughal Province of Delhi Subah.

Wazir Khan is noted for his conflicts with the Sikhs and became infamous for ordering the execution of Guru Gobind Singh's young sons (Sahibzada Fateh Singh and Sahibzada Zorawar Singh) in 1704. He was the governor of Sirhind when he arrested the two younger sons of Guru Gobind Singh. Wazir Khan tried to force the young sons of the Guru to embrace Islam. When they refused to accept Islam he ordered them to be bricked alive and later beheaded them after knowing that they were still alive inside even though that was not in the order.

Wazir Khan was defeated and beheaded by a Sikh warrior Fateh Singh, a warrior in the Sikh Khalsa, during the Battle of Chappar Chiri on 12 May 1710. His body was desecrated, dragged by an ox, and then hung onto a tree.
