= Samana, India =

Samana Samana Mandi
- Town
- Location in Punjab, India Samana (India)
- Coordinates: 30.15°N 76.19°E
- Country: India
- State: Punjab
- District: Patiala
- Elevation: 240 m (790 ft)

Population (2011)
  - Total: 54,072

Languages
  - Official: Punjabi, Hindi, English
- Time zone: UTC+5:30 (IST)
- PIN: 147101
- Telephone code: 91-1764
- Vehicle registration: PB 42

Samana is a town and a municipal council, nearby Patiala City in Patiala district in the Indian state of Punjab.

Before Independence, Samana was a part of Patiala Kingdom (PEPSU). Now it is a part of Patiala District of Punjab (India). There's nearest town is Ghagga and Patran. Before independence, Ghagga also part of Patiala kingdom. There is Patiala historical mansion.

== Geography ==
It has an average elevation of 240 metres (787 feet) with Latitude 30.1583 and Longitude 76.1931. It is located on State Highway(SH-10) between Patiala to Ghagga to Patran to Moonak. The distance between Patiala and Samana is 26 km (kilometers) or 16.3 miles.

== History ==
Samana was named after the wife of Imam Muhammad at-Taqi, respected by both Sunnis and Shias, by their five sons (namely Imam Mash'had Ali who moved from Mashhad to the present day Samana because of political tensions with the then Abbasid Caliphate's Caliph Al-Ma'mun after Al-Ma'mun poisoned and killed their father Imam Ali al-Ridha. After they got settled in the area, they named the place after their mother; Later, Mash'had Ali died there and his shrine is also located there and many Muslims go there to participate in the annual Symposium held in the premises of the Shrine.

Later the history is traced to the days of Raja Jaipal who ruled over, among others, the territories of Bathinda and Samana. It was included within the territory of Shahab-ud-Din Muhammad Gauri after the conquest of Ajmer and Delhi and was entrusted to Qutb ud-Din Aibak in 1192, along with the territories of Ghuram and Sunam.

Samana is listed in the Ain-i-Akbari as a pargana under the sarkar of Sirhind, producing a revenue of 12,822,270 dams for the imperial treasury and supplying a force of 2000 infantry and 700 cavalry.

While Samana is said to be a place of saints and scholars during the Mughal days, it was notorious also for its professional executioners, who served at Delhi and Sirhind. "Sayyad Jala-ud-Din", who was ordered to execute Sikh guru Guru Teg Bahadur ji at Delhi in 1675 was from Samana. Baig brothers, who were ordered to execute the younger sons of Guru Gobind Singh ji, 6 years old Sahibzada Fateh Singh and 9 years old Sahibzada Zorawar Singh, also belonged to Samana. This town was therefore one of the first places to have been sacked by the Sikh rebel Banda Singh Bahadur. He had to give up Samana towards the end of 1710 AD when it was retaken by the Mughals. The Sikhs retook it once again in 1742 AD under the leadership of Maharaja Ala Singh, the founder Maharaja of the Patiala State, and was recognized as a part of his territories by Ahmad Shah Durrani.

== Demographics ==
Religion in Samana, India (2011)
Religion	%
Hinduism	67.88
Sikhism	29.36
Jainism	1.26
Islam	0.81
Christianity	0.54
Buddhism	0.01
Other or not religious	0.14

As per 2011 India census, population statistics of Samana city:
Total Population: 54,072
Male Population: 28,309 (52.35%)
Female Population: 25,763 (47.65%)
Female Sex Ratio: 910
Literacy Rate: 85.85 %
Male Literacy Rate: 90.69 %
Female Literacy Rate: 78.58%

== Samana Constituency ==
Samana is one of the 117 legislative constituencies of Punjab. Its constituency no. is 116.

List of MLAs of Samana Constituency

- 1957: Harchand Singh (INC)
- 1962: Chaudhary Bhajan Lal (INC)
- 1967: Chaudhary Bhajan Lal (INC)
- 1969: Pritam Singh (SAD)
- 1972: Gurdev Singh (SAD)
- 1977: Gurdev Singh (SAD)
- 1980: Sant Ram Singla (INC)
- 1985: Hardial Singh Rajla (SAD)
- 1992: Captain Amarinder Singh (SAD)
- 1997: Jagtar Singh Rajla (SAD)
- 2002: Surjit Singh Rakhra (SAD)
- 2007: Brahm Mohindra (INC)
- 2012: Surjit Singh Rakhra (SAD)
- 2017: Rajinder Singh (INC)
- 2022: Chetan Singh Jauramajra (AAP)

== Places to visit ==
Panchmukhi Mandir: Panchmukhi Mandir is one of the earliest temples of Samana. It is a large temple devoted to Lord Shiva. Every year, a grand festival is celebrated in this temple on the occasion of Mahashivaratri, starts with a grand shobha yatra on previous day. Mata Naina Devi Mandir is also there inside the temple complex.

Gurudwara Thada Sahib: Thada Sahib is a Historical Gurudwara. Guru Tegh Bahadur Ji came to this place when he was on the way to Delhi. Guru Tegh Bahadur Ji came here to the place of Sai Anayat Ali. Adjoining was the area of a cruel Muslim, who had thrown cow bones in the well when Guru Sahib's Sikh went there for water. After that Guru Sahib got a well dug there.

Gurudwara Garhi Sahib: Nawab Bhikhan Shah, a Muslim who owned a nearby Garhi (fort), was a great follower of Guru Tegh Bahadur. When Guru ji visited Samana, he requested him to accompany him back to his garhi which was safer for Guru ji as Mughal spies and soldiers were looking to arrest Guru ji . Upon request from Bhikhan Shah, Guru ji visited his Garhi and since then this place is famous as Gurudwara Garhi Sahib in memoir of Guru Tegh Bahadur ji. This gurudwara is situated at the bank of Ghagar river.

Bir Gurdialpura Wildlife Sanctuary: Bir Gurdialpura Wildlife Sanctuary is about 15 km from Samana. It was one of the important hunting reserves of the erstwhile rulers of Patiala state. It was declared a protected forest and then as a sanctuary under the Fauna of Patiala Act. The sanctuary has a good ecological value and habitat for number of wild animals.

Panj Peer Mazar: It is a major pilgrimage centre for Shia Muslims. Sayyid Mash'had Ali, who was son of 8th Shia Imam Ali al-Ridha was buried here about 1200 years ago and the town of Samana also takes its name from his mother. According to scholars of Muslim history, the discovery of the mazar is very significant as there is no mazar of any Imam in South Asia.

New Aggarwal Gaushaala: It is one of largest Gaushaalas in Punjab. It is built on the banks of Bhakra, on Samana-Patiala road. It covers 12 acres area. People visit here on the daily basis and offers charity and help.

Pingla Ashram: It is a charitable center and home for intellectually disabled, handicapped and elderly helpless people. It was started by Hari Chand. It is being operated by the blessings of respected Hari Chand and handling by committee of reputed people of Samana. It is managed by Sh. Inderjit Dawar for more than a period of 51 years as a successor of Hari chand without accepting any serving fees of his duty. It is run by the donations from generous people of local town, adjacent villages and abroad.

Maisar Mandir: A famous Maisar Mandir, dedicated to goddess Durga is located on the border of Samana and Shadipur (Haryana). Every year, a grand fair is organized here on the occasion of Navaratri.

Shri Sai Baba Mandir: It is located at the distance of 3 km from Samana.

Shri Durga Mata Mandir: It is a newly renovated temple located inside Aggarwal Dharamshala.

Shri Aggarwal Dharamshala & Devi Talab Mandir

Jamia Masjid: This mosque was built during British era and was a place of worship for the Muslims community. However, the mosque went out of use after Partition of India due to the Muslim community leaving for Pakistan.

== Colleges ==
- Adarsh Nursing College
- Dr Johri Degree College
- Nancy college of Education.
- Public College, Samana
- SASM College of Law
- Aggarsain Women college
- Aadarsh degree college

== Schools ==
- Acharya Devinder Muni Jain Model High School, Shehajpura Road, Samana
- Aggarsain International public school Samana
- Akal Academy School, Fatehgarh Channa
- Budha Dal Public School, Samana
- D.A.V Public School, Samana
- D.A.V Public school, Badshahpur
- D.A.V Public school, Kakrala.
- D.A.V Public school, Kularan.
- Dayanand Model High School, Samana
- Holy heart public school, Samana
- Mind Glow Academy, Samana
- Model public Sr. Sec. school Samana
- Premier public school Samana
- Public Sr. Sec School Samana
- S.D. Model High School, Samana
- St. Lawrence Sr. Sec. School, Samana
- Shivalik multipurpose public school
- SRS Vidyapeeth Patiala Road Samana
- The Winners Academy, Samana
- Baba Banda Singh Bahadur Public Sr. Sec. School, Fatehpur

== Gallery ==
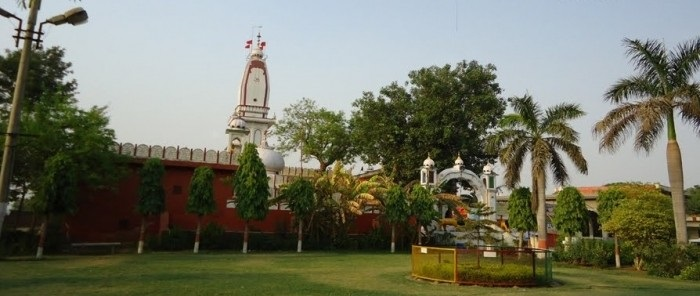
Panchmukhi Mandir
