= Amloh =

- Town
- Location in Punjab, India
- Coordinates: 30.61°N 76.23°E
- Country: India
- State: Punjab
- District: Fatehgarh Sahib
- Elevation: 259 m (850 ft)

Population (2011)
  - Total: 14,696

Languages
  - Official: Punjabi
- Time zone: UTC+5:30 (IST)
- Postal code: 147203
- Vehicle registration: PB-48

Amloh is a city, sub-district and municipal council in Fatehgarh Sahib district in the state of Punjab, India. It is located near the industrial town of Mandi Gobindgarh.

== History ==
Amloh is a sub-district of Fatehgarh Sahib district. Amloh was founded by Faiz Baksh, the Governor of Sirhind. After the fall of Sirhind in 1763, Amloh was annexed by Raja Hamir Singh, the ruler of Nabha State. It was developed by the erstwhile ruler of Nabha State. The fort in the town was constructed by Raja Hira Singh of Nabha. It was given the status of Nizamat (District) headquarters.

=== Modern History ===
After the creation of District Fatehgarh Sahib in 1992, Amloh was given the status of sub-divisional headquarters. Some part of the old building of the fort is now occupied by government offices.

However, the major portion of the fort is in a dilapidated condition. Amloh town is also a block and tehsil headquarters. This block consists of 100 Revenue Estates/villages. The total area of the block is 26,893 hectares. Paddy, wheat, potato, and sunflower are the main crops of the block. A sugar mill viz. Nahar Sugar & Allied Industries Ltd. has started functioning at village Khumna near Amloh on Khanna - Amloh road, due to which the cropping pattern of the block has changed. The block has adequate irrigation facilities.

All the villages of the block have been allotted among 13 branches of commercial banks under Service Area Approach. Besides, 11 branches of commercial banks are functioning at Mandi Gobindgarh. The block has five branches of Fatehgarh Sahib Central Coop. Bank Ltd. and 1 branch of Primary Agricultural Land Development Bank at Amloh.

It has an average elevation of 259 metres (850 feet).

Amloh also has a judicial court complex which is located in the middle of the city.

== Demographics ==
The table below shows the population of different religious groups in Amloh city, as of 2011 census.

Population by religious groups in Amloh city, 2011 census
Religion	Total	Female	Male
Hindu	7,590	3,417	4,173
Sikh	6,695	3,154	3,541
Muslim	315	149	166
Christian	45	18	27
Buddhist	3	1	2
Not stated	48	25	23
Total	14,696	6,764	7,932

== Education ==
There are several no. of schools in Amloh that are both government and privately owned. The students of Amloh's schools have performed good in academics and sports as well. The list of schools in Amloh is as follows:

1. Government Senior Secondary School (Boys)
2. Government Senior Secondary School (Girls)
3. Amloh Public High School (Goyal School)
4. Pink Rose Public School (Annia Road)
5. St. Farid Public School
6. Lord Guru Nanak International School
7. St. Xavier's Convent School, Bhadalthuha
8. Desh Bhagat Global School
9. Maghi Memorial Public School
10. Government Elementary School
11. Baby Modern High School
12. Jyoti Playway School
13. Sunrise Playway
14. Maharishi Mehi Vidya Mandir
15. Dashmesh Public School
16. Garden Valley International School

Apart from these, there are several other Government Schools.

=== Higher Education ===
Desh Bhagat University which holds second rank among the privately owned universities in Punjab is only about 2.1 kilometers away from Amloh.

Maghi Memorial College for women is also catering for the higher education of women in Amloh.

=== Other Educational Institutes ===
Apart from school and college education, there are several other institutes that provide educational services in different fields.

1. Canadian Express Immigration
2. AD immigration and ielts center
3. Spark Education
4. GD Infotech
5. Touchstone Educationals
6. Bluelap Study Centre
7. Supreme Studies Immigration

== Healthcare ==
The city of Amloh is served by Community Health Centre Amloh which is commonly referred to as "civil hospital".
