= Daddu Majra =

Village in Punjab, India

- Village
- Location in Punjab, India Daddu Majra (India)
- Coordinates: 30.7535°N 76.7418°E
- Country: India
- State: Punjab
- District: Fatehgarh Sahib

Area
  - Total: 321 ha (790 acres)
- Elevation: 254 m (833 ft)

Population (2011)
  - Total: 1,586
  - Density: 494/km^{2} (1,280/sq mi)

Languages
  - Official: Punjabi
- Time zone: UTC+5:30 (IST)
- Postal code: 140203
- Vehicle registration: PB-49

Dadu Majra is a village located in Fatehgarh Sahib district in Punjab, India. The village is located 23 km from the district headquarters of Fatehgarh Sahib. According to the 2011 census data, Dadu Majra has a total population of 1,586 people.

== Population ==
Particulars	Total	Male	Female
Total Population	1,586	836	750
Literate Population	1,147	647	500
Illiterate Population	439	189	250
