= Khamanon =

- Town
- Location in Punjab, India Khamanon (India)
- Coordinates: 30.82°N 76.35°E
- Country: India
- State: Punjab
- District: Fatehgarh Sahib
- Elevation: 254 m (833 ft)

Population (2011)
  - Total: 80,991

Languages
  - Official: Punjabi
  - Native: Puadhi
- Time zone: UTC+5:30 (IST)
- Vehicle registration: PB-49

Khamanon is a town and a Nagar Panchayat in Fatehgarh Sahib district in the Indian state of Punjab.

== Geography ==
Khamanon is located at 30.82°N 76.35°E. It has an average elevation of 254 metres (833 feet).

== Demographics ==
As of 2011 India census, Khamanon had a population of 10135. Males constitute 53% of the population and females 47%.

The table below shows the population of different religious groups in Khamanon town, as of 2011 census.

Population by religious groups in Khamanon town, 2011 census
Religion	Total	Female	Male
Sikh	6,970	3,356	3,614
Hindu	2,762	1,229	1,533
Muslim	358	125	233
Christian	31	14	17
Jain	5	4	1
Buddhist	1	0	1
Not stated	8	5	3
Total	10,135	4,733	5,402

== See also ==
- Mohan Majra
