= Rupalheri =

Coordinates: 30°40′54″N 76°32′08″E

Rupalheri is a village in Bassi Pathana Tehsil in the Fatehgarh Sahib District of Punjab, India. The village is equipped with all major facilities such as irrigation, water supply for homes and electricity. Along with this, it has two schools one is a Government senior secondary school and one Government elementary school. Students from nearby areas come to study here. There are three Gurudwaras, two temples, one mosque, and also a dera where people of all religions and castes came to pray and wish. The name of this dera is Dera Baba Rangi Ram Ji, Rupalheri. Every year in the month of June a fair is organized by the people of the village and nearby villages in Rupalheri. This fair includes various cultural games and recreational activities of Punjab such as music, wrestling, kabaddi, volleyball and other tournaments. The village also has S.H.C (Subsidiary health centre) and a sub centre to cater to medical needs of nearby villages. The S.H.C is run by Zila Prashid Fatehgarh sahib . One Rural Medical Officer, one pharmacist, one class four employee are posted here. The sub centre is run by Punjab health department, one ANM and one multi purpose health worker are posted in the sub centre . this centre caters to five villages namely Rupalheri, Didiana, Kasumbari, Rallon, Gadhera. Besides public health, staff of sub centre also conducts regular immunization program on every Wednesday in different villages according to a given schedule. Also death and birth certificates are issued in the sub centre . Sub centre Rupalheri does not have its own building, at present it is running from the building of S.H.C Rupalheri. The other sub centre falling under S.H.C Rupalheri is sub centre Pamour . This centre caters to following villages Pamour, Sampla, Sampli, Kheribir, Shergarh bara, Kamali. The Rupalheri village is located 25.9 km from ISBT 43 Chandigarh
