= Desh Bhagat University =

Educational institution in India

- Motto: Innovation, Research & Entrepreneurship
- Established: 2012
- Affiliations: UGC, AIU, PCI, COA, BCI, INC, AICTE, Punjab Nurses Registration Council (PNRC)
- Chancellor: Dr. Zora Singh
- Vice-Chancellor: Dr. Harsh Sadawarti
- Administrative staff: 1500
- Location: Fatehgarh Sahib, Punjab, India
- Website: deshbhagatuniversity.in

Desh Bhagat University (DBU) is a private university located in Fatehgarh Sahib district in Punjab within the town of Mandi Gobindgarh. The university was established under The Desh Bhagat University Act, 2012 (Punjab Act No. 15 of 2013) of Punjab Legislative Assembly. DBU has four campuses in India at Fatehgarh Sahib, Shri Muktsar Sahib, Moga, and Chandigarh as well as an international campus in Kenya.

Desh Bhagat University came into existence under the guidance of S. Lal Singh, a freedom fighter and an assistant of Subhas Chander Bose.

As of 2025, Dr. Zora Singh is the Chancellor of the university and Prof. (Dr.) Harsh Sadawarti is the Vice-Chancellor.

== Affiliations ==
Desh Bhagat University is affiliated with the University Grants Commission (UGC). Desh Bhagat University is also affiliated with the Pharmacy Council of India (PCI) and the Indian Nursing Council (INC). Desh Bhagat University's law programmes of LLB, B.A, LLB and LLM are affiliated with the Bar Council of India (BCI). Desh Bhagat University is also accredited by NAAC with an A+ rank.

== Academic ==
DBU has faculties in the fields of Engineering, Management, Hotel Management, Hospitality and Tourism, Computer Sciences, Ayurveda, Nursing, Education, Commerce, Media, Animation, Airlines, Law, Agriculture Sciences, Performing Arts, Languages, Social Sciences, Applied Sciences, Pharmacy, Dental Sciences, Paramedical Sciences, Art & Craft and Fashion Technology. It has nearly 50 streams and over 350 courses at the certificate, diploma, undergraduate, graduate, postgraduate, and doctorate levels are available.

== Campus ==
Desh Bhagat University is situated in Fatehgarh Sahib, Punjab. DBU covering a large area of land. The grounds of the university offer flora and fauna along with new structures. Fully Wi-Fi campus, Research Centers, AC classrooms with current teaching aids, digitally equipped labs, and a stocked library with books, journals, printed materials, and an online browsing facility. There are separate hostels for boys and girls with many amenities. DBU has its own transport facility. DBU has seminar halls, auditoriums, and conference halls for all types of official and cultural occasions. DBU also has playgrounds for the students to play different games, a multi-cuisine cafeteria, and a mini supermarket for basic needs.
