= Mohan Majra =

- Village
- Location in Punjab, India Mohan Majra (India)
- Coordinates: 30.766877°N 76.370355°E
- Country: India
- State: Punjab
- District: Fatehgarh Sahib

Population
  - Total: 2,000 (aporx)

Languages
  - Official: Punjabi
- Time zone: UTC+5:30 (IST)
- PIN: 140802
- Nearest city: khamanon
- Literacy: 65%%
- Climate: hot (Köppen)

Mohan Majra is a village in Fatehgarh Sahib, Punjab, India. It is about 2 km away from Sanghol.
