= Mandi Gobindgarh =

Mandi Gobindgarh RandiTown
- Town
- Nickname: Gobindgarh
- Location in Punjab, India Mandi Gobindgarh (India)
- Coordinates: 30.41°N 76.18°E
- Country: India
- State: Punjab
- District: Fatehgarh Sahib
- Established: 30 July 2011

Population (2011)
  - Total: 73,130
- Time zone: UTC+5:30 (IST)
- PIN: 147301
- Telephone code: 01765
- Vehicle registration: PB 23
- Sex ratio: 878/1000 ♂/♀

Mandi Gobindgarh is a town and municipal committee in Fatehgarh Sahib district in the state of Punjab in North India. It is also referred to as the "Steel City of Punjab or "Loha Mandi" due to its large number of steel factories.

== History ==
According to local knowledge (and authenticated by the Shiromani Gurudwara Parbandhak Committee (SGPC)), the sixth Sikh Guru, Guru Hargobind, stayed along the bank of Lake Barhi Dhab for 40 days in 1646. He was accompanied by his followers and warriors. A skirmish developed between his men and a contingent of Mughal forces. Their weapons sustained damage. The Guru's men pleaded before him that they could not continue to fight, as there was no available steel in the area to repair their weapons. Guru Hargobind replied,

"Someday this place will be a large steel-producing center in the country. Why do you say no steel is available to repair your weapons?"

Henceforth, Barhi Dhab was known as "Gobindgarh" as named after Guru Hargobind Ji. To date, a Gurudwara remains situated near the town's railway station to commemorate Guru Hargobind in his holy memory.

Industrialization in Mandi Gobindgarh began at the start of the 20th century. In 1902, the Maharaja Hira Singh of Nabha, where Gobindgarh then lay, ordered the building of industrial units in the town. Maharaja Partap Singh conducted further industrial development.

In 1928, Gobindgarh became a free trade zone for steel. As a center for steel, the town experienced growth. The land was made available to local blacksmiths at nominal rates in early 1940, leading to the establishment of a number of workshops on both sides of the G.T. Road at Gobindgarh.

Mandi Gobindgarh began as a walled town with four gates, which neighbored Modi Mills, Munilal Om Prakash, the main post office (present to this day), and Krishna Mandir. All the gates were closed by sunset. In 1950, the gates were demolished.

== Climate ==
Gobindgarh has been ranked 1st best “National Clean Air City” under (Category 3 population under 3 lakhs cities) in India.

== Demographics ==
As of 2001 India census, Gobindgarh has a population of 55,416. Males constitute 56% of the population, while females 44%. Gobindgarh has an average literacy rate of 69%, considerably higher than the national average of 59.5% (72% for males and 67% for females). 12% of the population is under 6 years of age.

== Economy ==
The economy of the town has been based primarily on steel and related industries. It has nearly 200 steel-rolling mills serving 25% of the secondary steel market of the country. There are approximately 250 induction furnaces producing raw material for the rolling mills, 30 forging units catering to the needs of the steel-rolling mills, sugar and paper industry, around 40 foundry units, 200 scrap-cutting units, and 12 oxygen plants catering to the local requirements of the industry. In addition, there are another 67 industrial units associated with the steel industry. There is a vibrant trading community that ensures steel products manufactured are sold throughout India.

The steel economy attracts workers from all of India, especially from Bihar, Delhi and U.P.

=== Financial crisis from 2008 ===
The industry of Mandi Gobindgarh was affected by the 2008 financial crisis and subsequent global recession. From 2012 to 2015, tax duties on imports and exports were increased, hurting profits of the Gobindgarh steel mills. Thousands of people became unemployed and were forced to return home after the closure of several factories within a short span of time.

== Schools ==
- Om Parkash Bansal Modern School (OPBMS)
- Gobindgarh Public School (GPS)
- P.S.S.R Jain Memorial Sen. Sec. School
- S.N.A.S. Sr. Sec. School (Arya)
- Punjab Public School (Near Canal Road)
- Government Girls Smart School
- Guru Hargobind Senior Secondary School (Khalsa School) for Boys
- G.R.S.D.Public School
- Adarsh Public sen. Sec. School
- Sacred Heart Senior Secondary School
- Saint Farid Public School
- Sun Rise Public School
- SNAS Model Senior Secondary School
- S.D. Model School
- Blue Star public school
- Shaheed Bhagat Singh Public School
- Lady LRD Public School
- Baba Vishwakarma Public School

== Higher Education ==
- Desh Bhagat University
- RIMT University
- Gobindgarh Public College
- Cyber School & Services (hSECURITIES)
