= Aam Khas Bagh =

Park in Punjab, India

Coordinates: 30.636347°N 76.397156°E

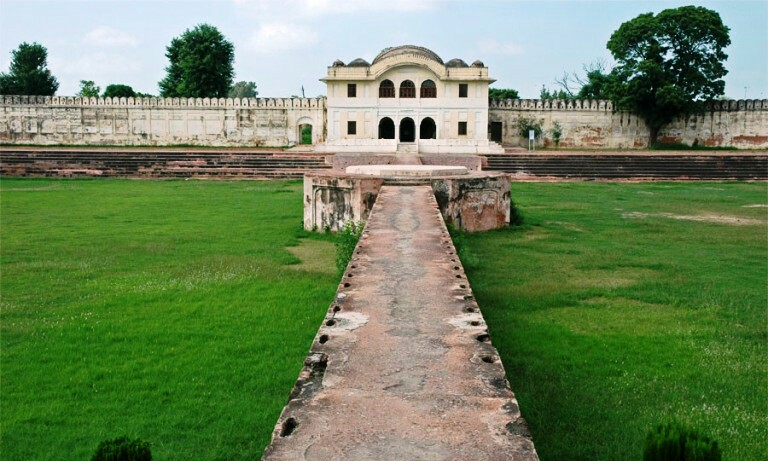
- Aam Khas Bagh, Fatehgarh Sahib district, Punjab, India
- Interactive map of Aam Khas Bagh
- Type: Mughal garden
- Location: Fatehgarh Sahib, Punjab, India
- Owner: Archaeological Survey of India
- Status: Under repair

Aam Khas Bagh is the remains of a highway-inn. It was divided into two parts - the Aam for public use and the Khas for private use by royalty. The inn was initially built by Akbar and planned by Mughal architect Hafiz Rakhna. It was rebuilt by Mughal Emperor Shah Jahan along the Mughal military road between Delhi and Lahore. The Royal couple stayed in the old building complex while going to and coming back from Lahore. Later on, some additions were made to the structure by Mughal Emperor Jahangir.

== Complex ==
The complex was famous for an air conditioning system called Sarad Khana. The Sheesh Mahal of the Daulat-Khana-e-Khas, the hamam and the tank had unique methods of heating water. The palace compound also had a set of fountains. Water for the fountains was drawn from a huge well nearby and circulated through underground conduits. A Mughal type garden and nursery are maintained. The complex, which has archaeological value, is being maintained by the Archaeological Survey of India. The area was maintained until a few years ago. The buildings which are in worst condition include Daulat Khana Khas, Sard Khana and Shahi Hamaam. Lack of upkeep has ruined these buildings.

The complex also has an orchard spread over 11 acres of land. The orchard has mango, pear and guava plantations and some trees are more than 70 years old.

== Monuments ==
The following monuments are situated in the vicinity of Aam Khas Bagh:

- Sard Khana - An air conditioned chamber built by Emperor Jahangir. The water was pulled through large pulleys from an adjoining well and was passed through water channels running through the walls of this building and was used for fountains and waterfalls.
- Sheesh Mahal, also known as Daulat-Khana-E-Khas, is a structure built on the orders of Emperor Jahangir. There have been some subsequent alterations to the original building. The domes of the monument were decorated with glazed tiles, some of which are still visible today.
- Hamam - This monument was constructed by the orders of Emperor Jahangir. In this, water was taken through underground terracotta channels and a unique method of heating the water was adopted.
- Tank - This tank was constructed by the orders of Emperor Jahangir. There was a Mehtabi-Chabutra in the centre which has fallen down. On the east and west sides of this tank, quarters for Mughal employees were built.
- Daulat Khana-E-Khas- This double storeyed monument was built by Mughal Emperor Shah Jahan as his private residence. All the rooms and main walls of this building were decorated with designs. The central hall measured 18 x 14 and eastern walls were having two tall minarets. On the northern side there were many tanks and fountains which added to the grandeur of the building.

== Light and sound show ==
During Shaheedi Jor Mela at Fatehgarh Sahib, the light and sound programme regarding the history of Sirhind and the martyrdom of younger sons of Guru Gobind Singh in the form of Play - Sirhind Di Deewar is shown to the visitors at night in the Aam Khas Bagh.

== Gallery ==
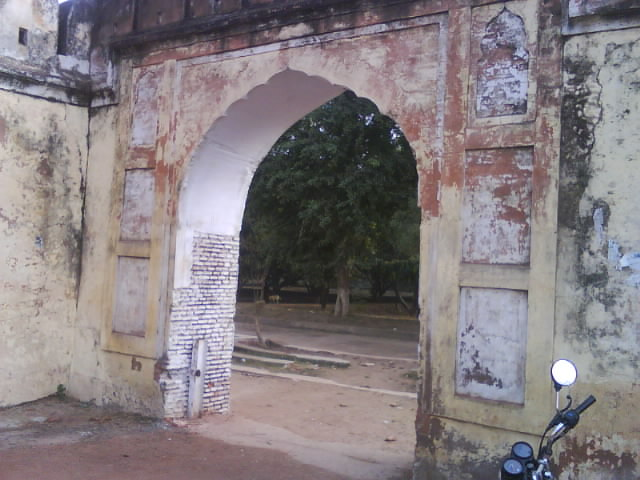
Main Entry Gate of Aam Khas Bagh

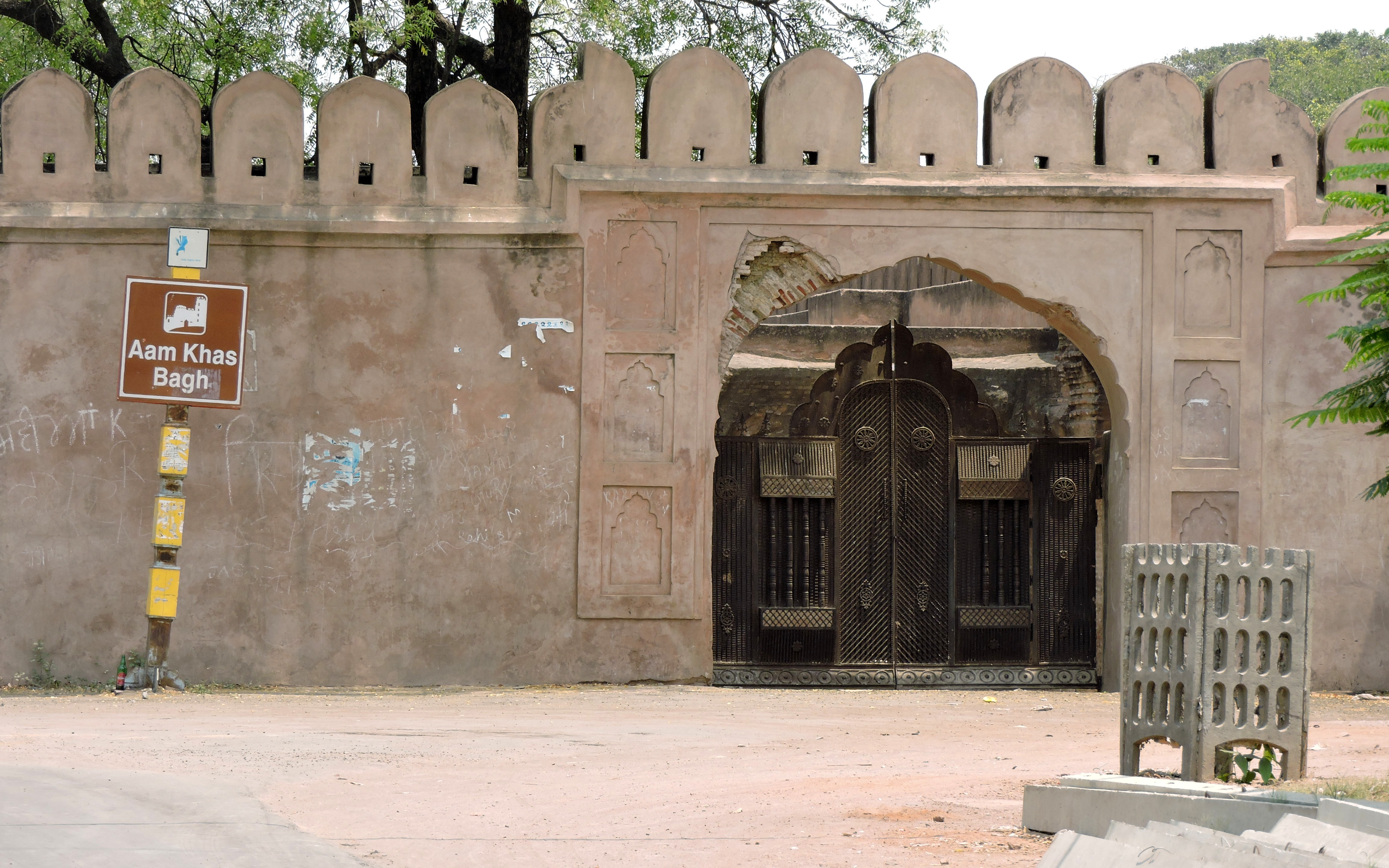
Entrance of Aam khas Bag, Sirhind, Fatehgarh Sahib district, Punjab, India

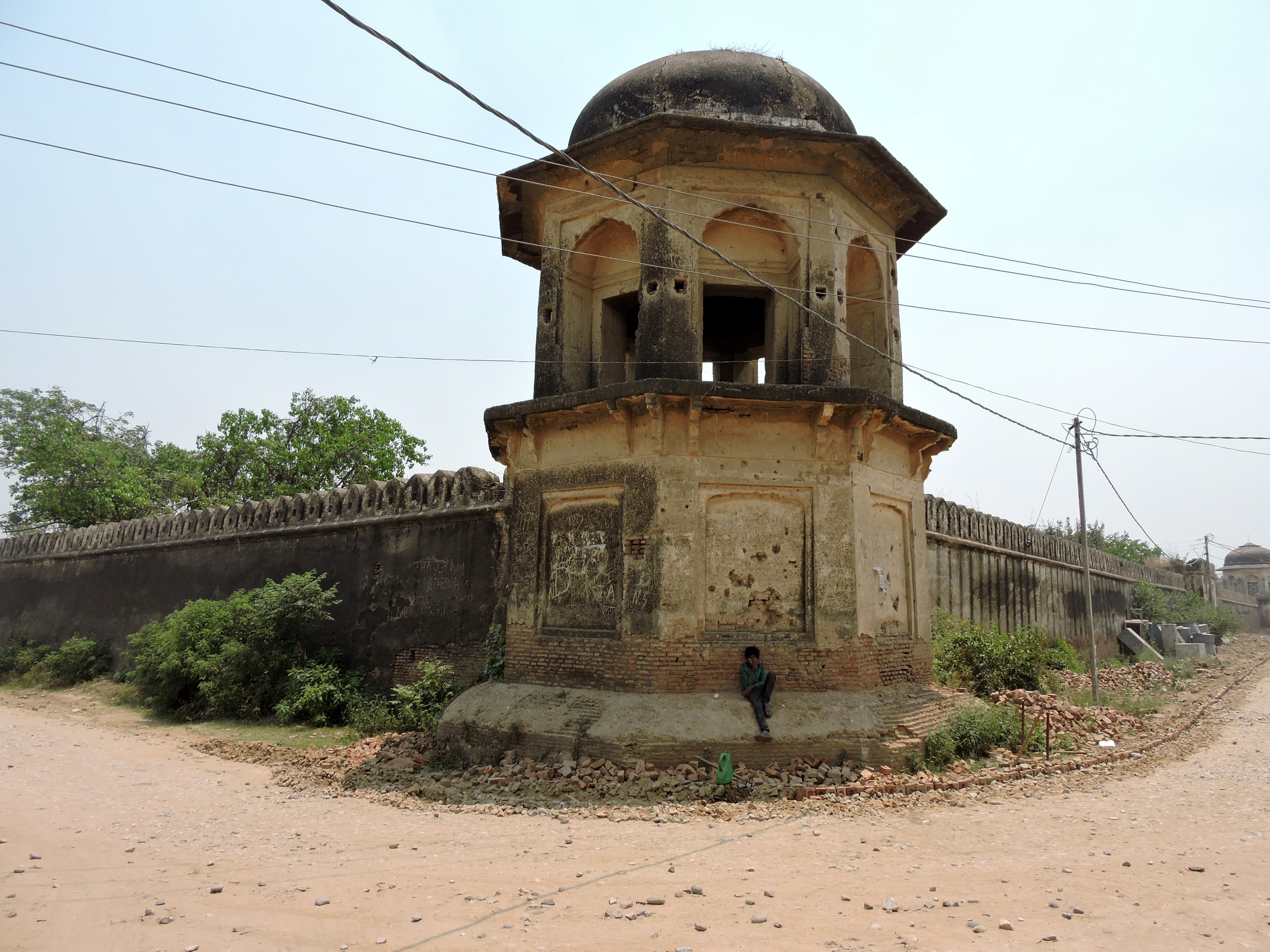
Aam khas Bag, Sirhind, Fatehgarh Sahib district, Punjab, India, North West side

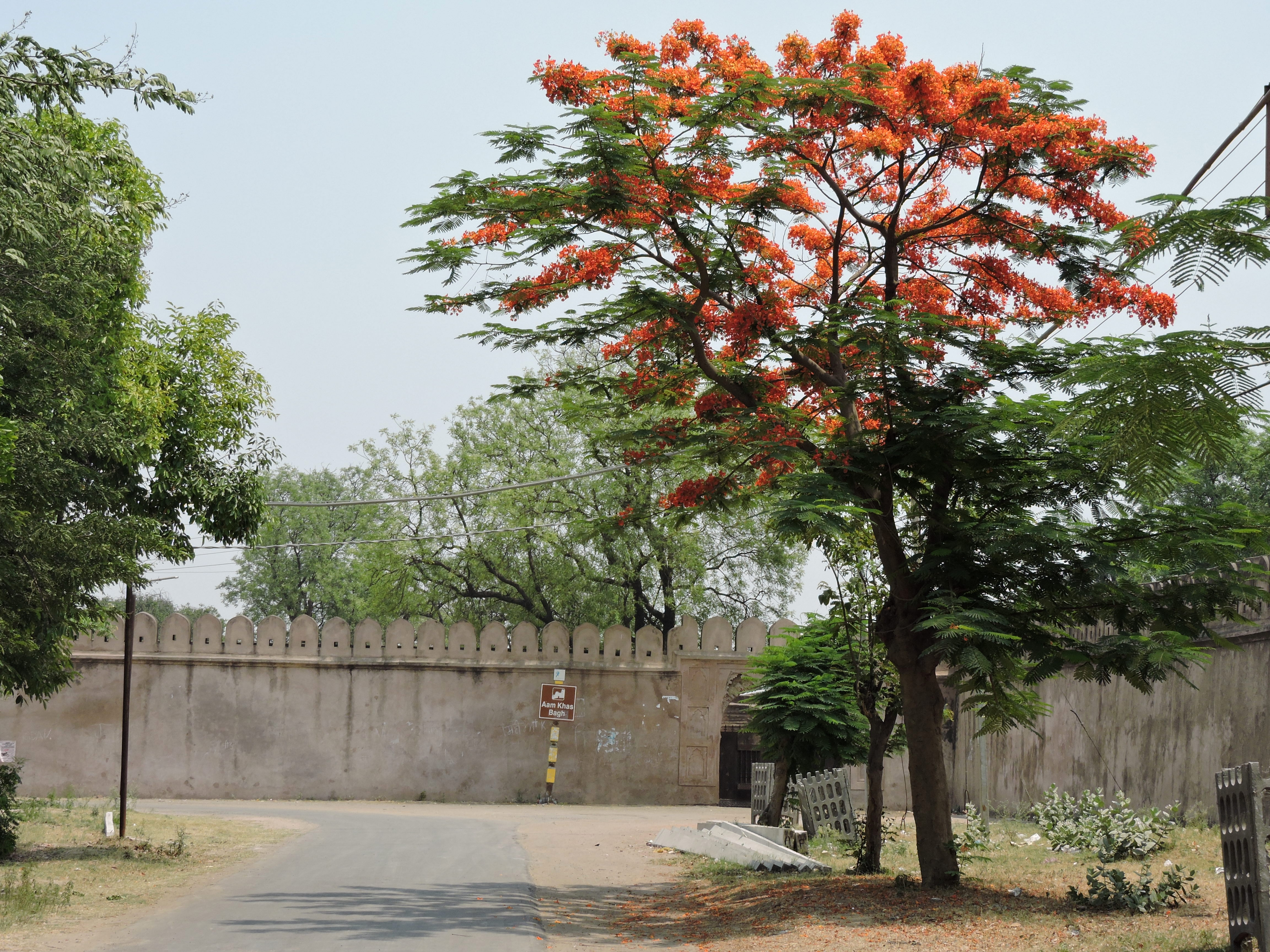
Aam khas Bag, Sirhind, Fatehgarh Sahib district, Punjab, India, Entrance

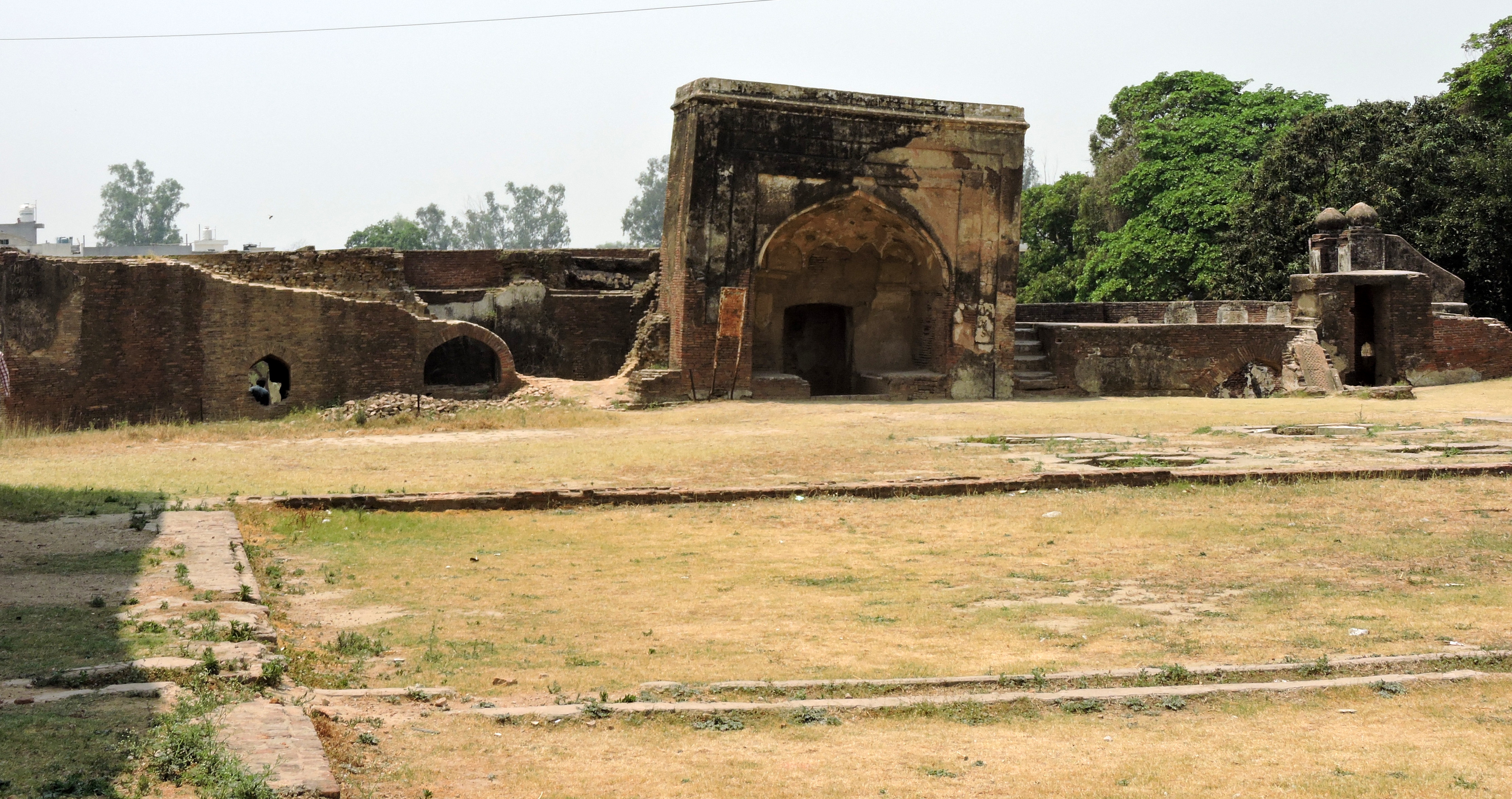
Aam khas Bag, Sirhind, Fatehgarh Sahib district, Punjab, India, Sarad Khana

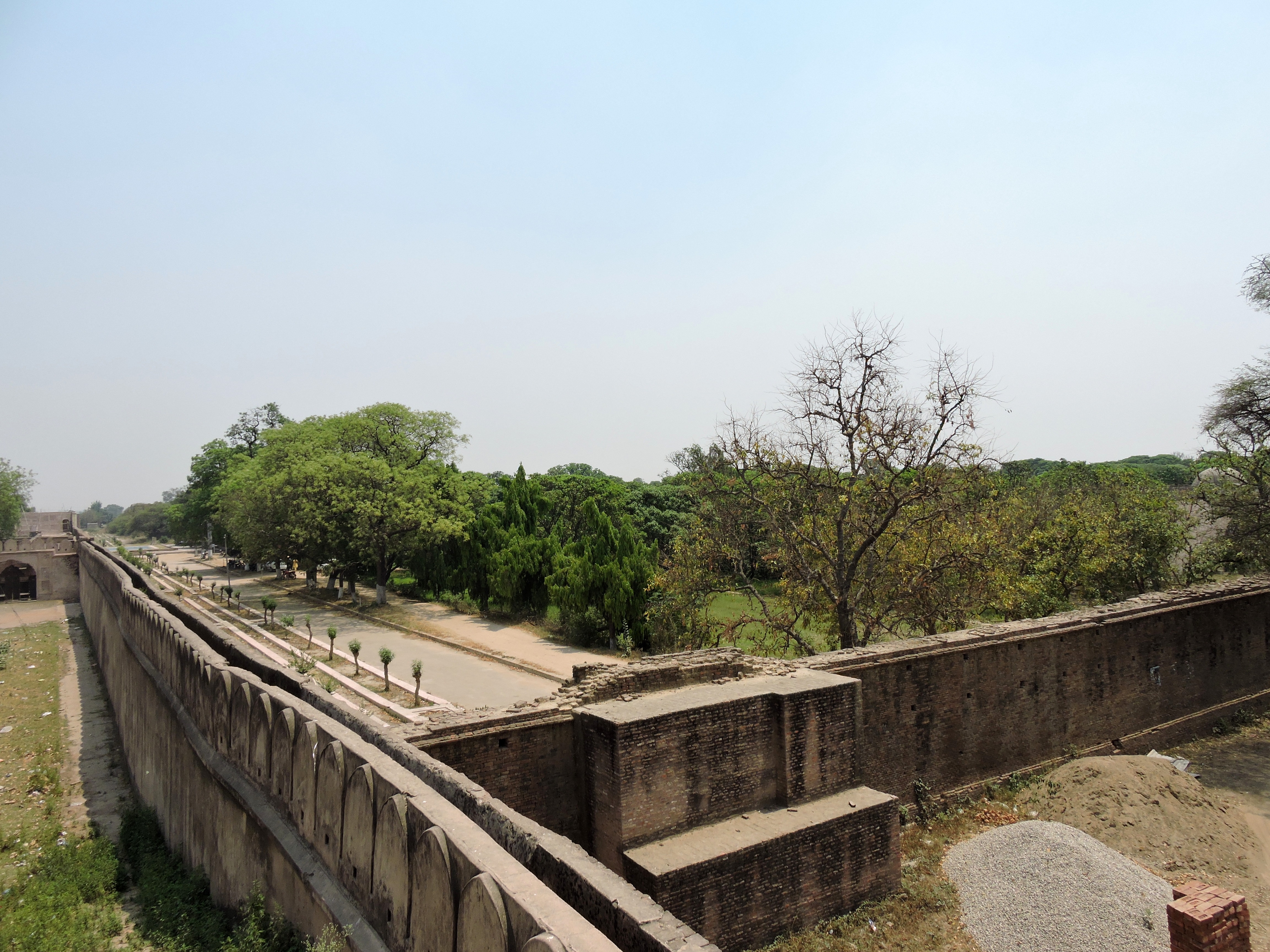
Aam khas Bag, Sirhind, Fatehgarh Sahib district, Punjab, India, view from height

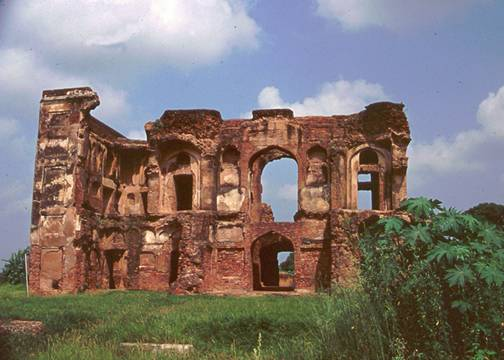
ruins of Daulat Khana-E-Khas

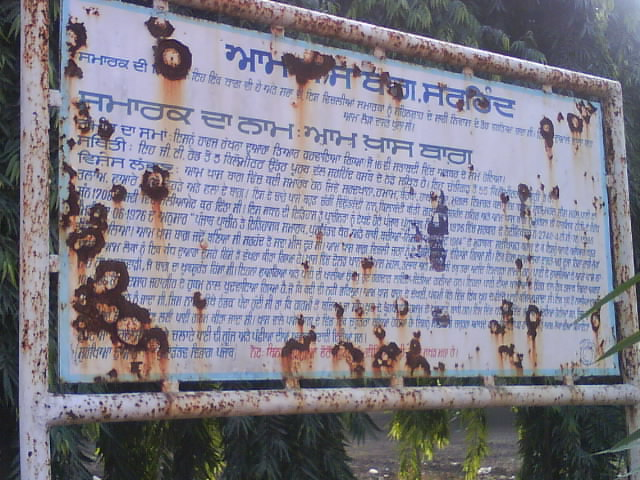
Visitor's board in dilapidated condition

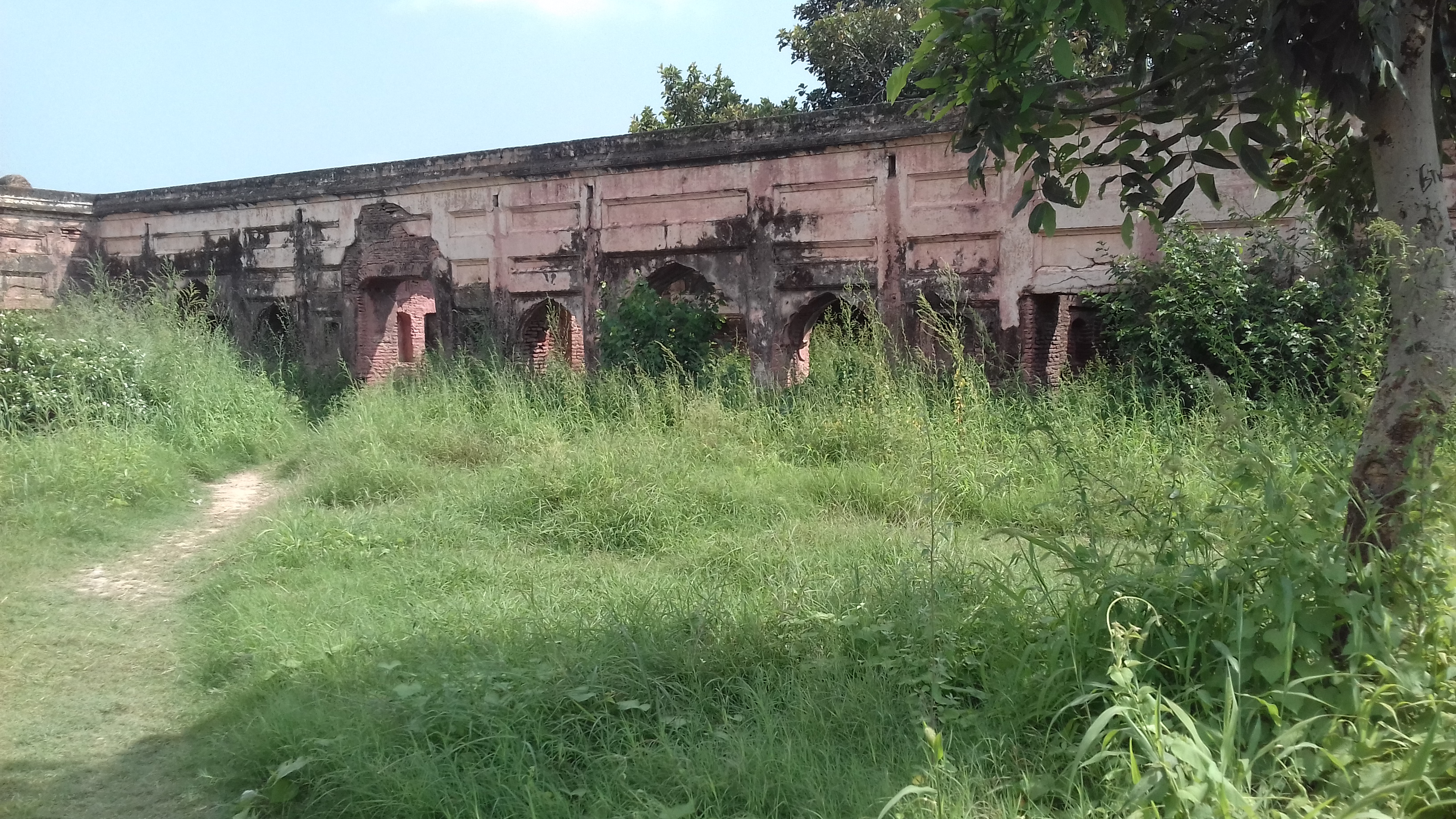
Sarai Wing ruins

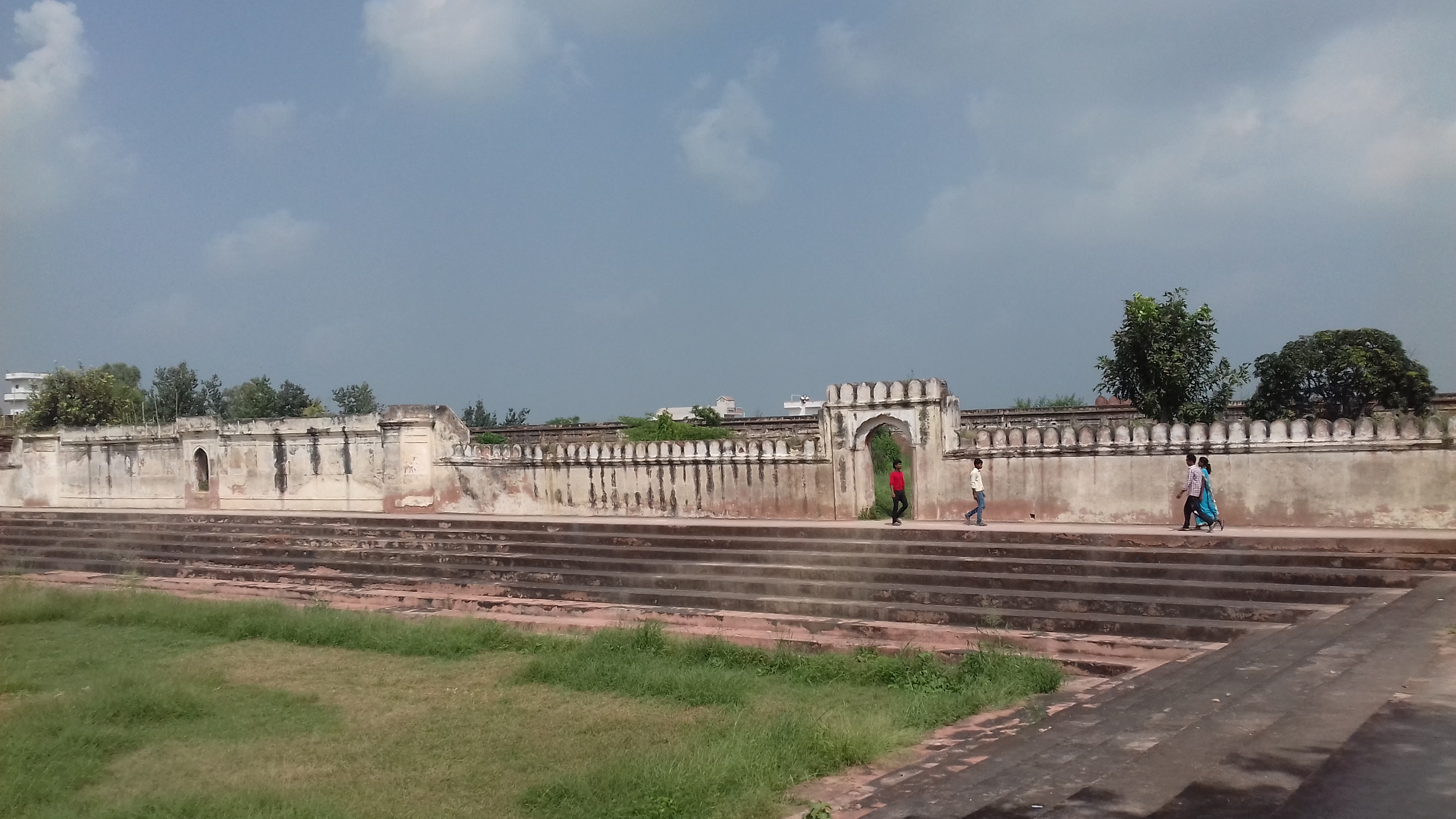
Main Water Tank Aam Khas Bhag Fatehgarh Sahib

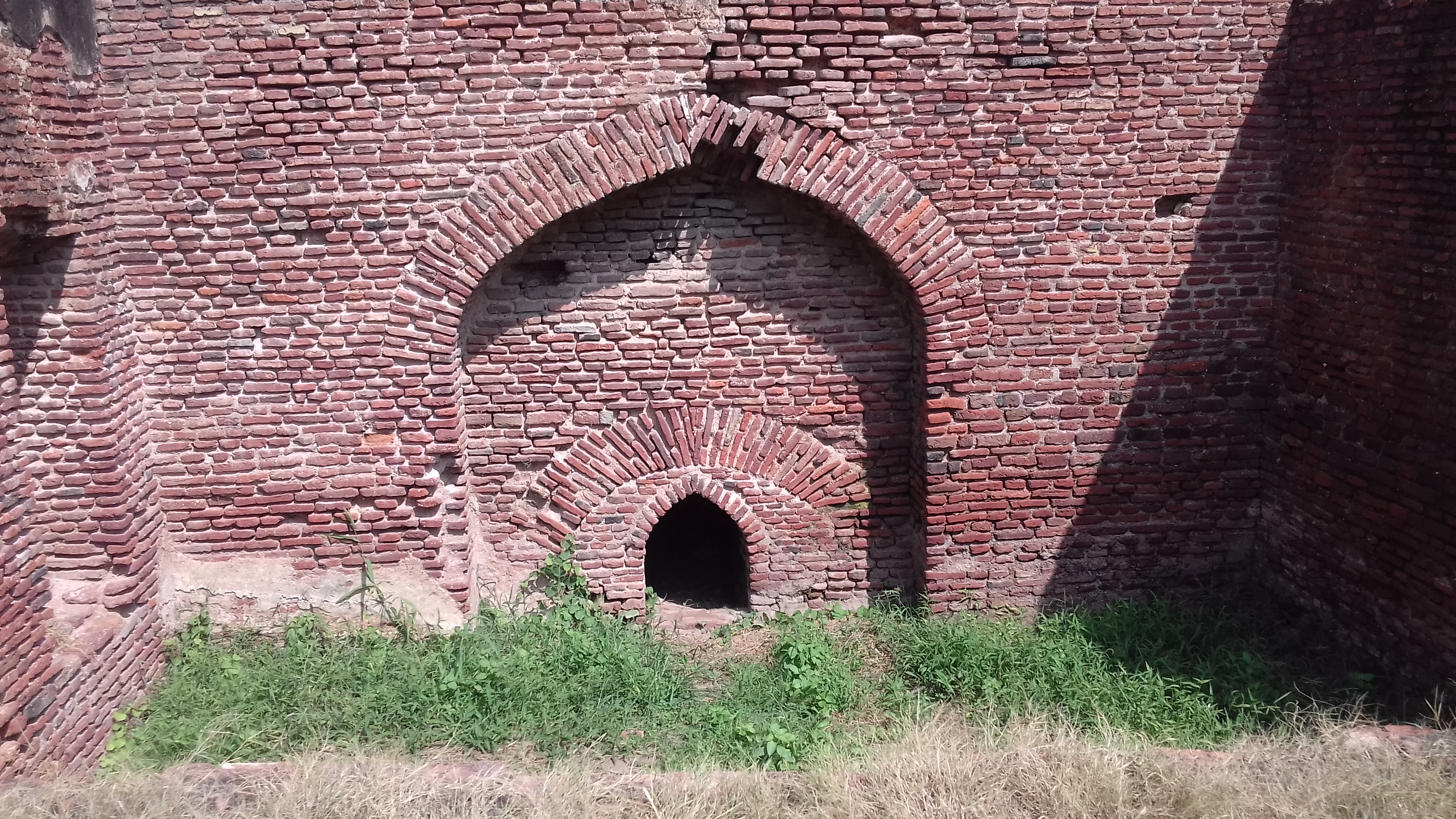
Hamam External Water Channel

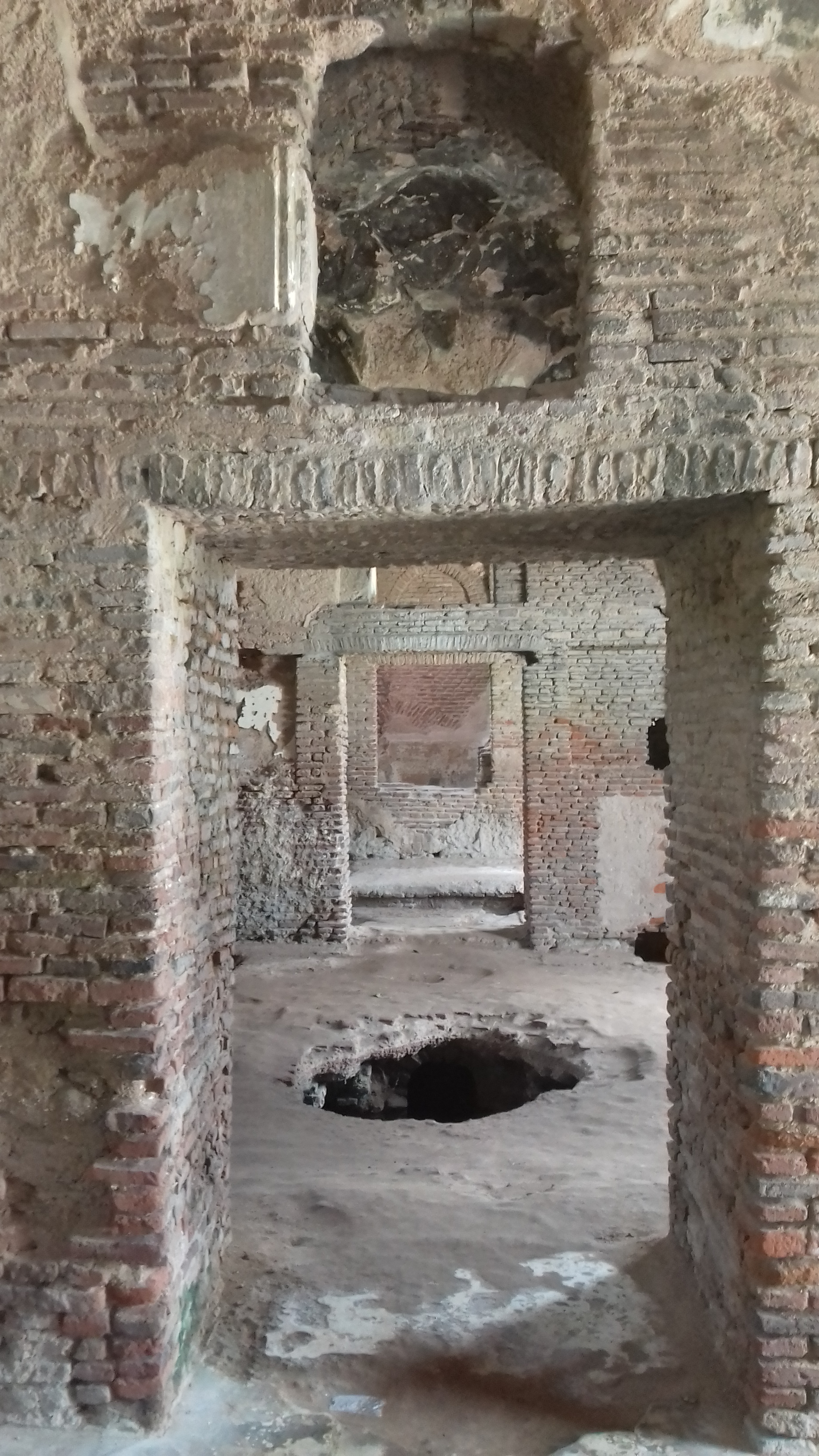
Hamam internal view

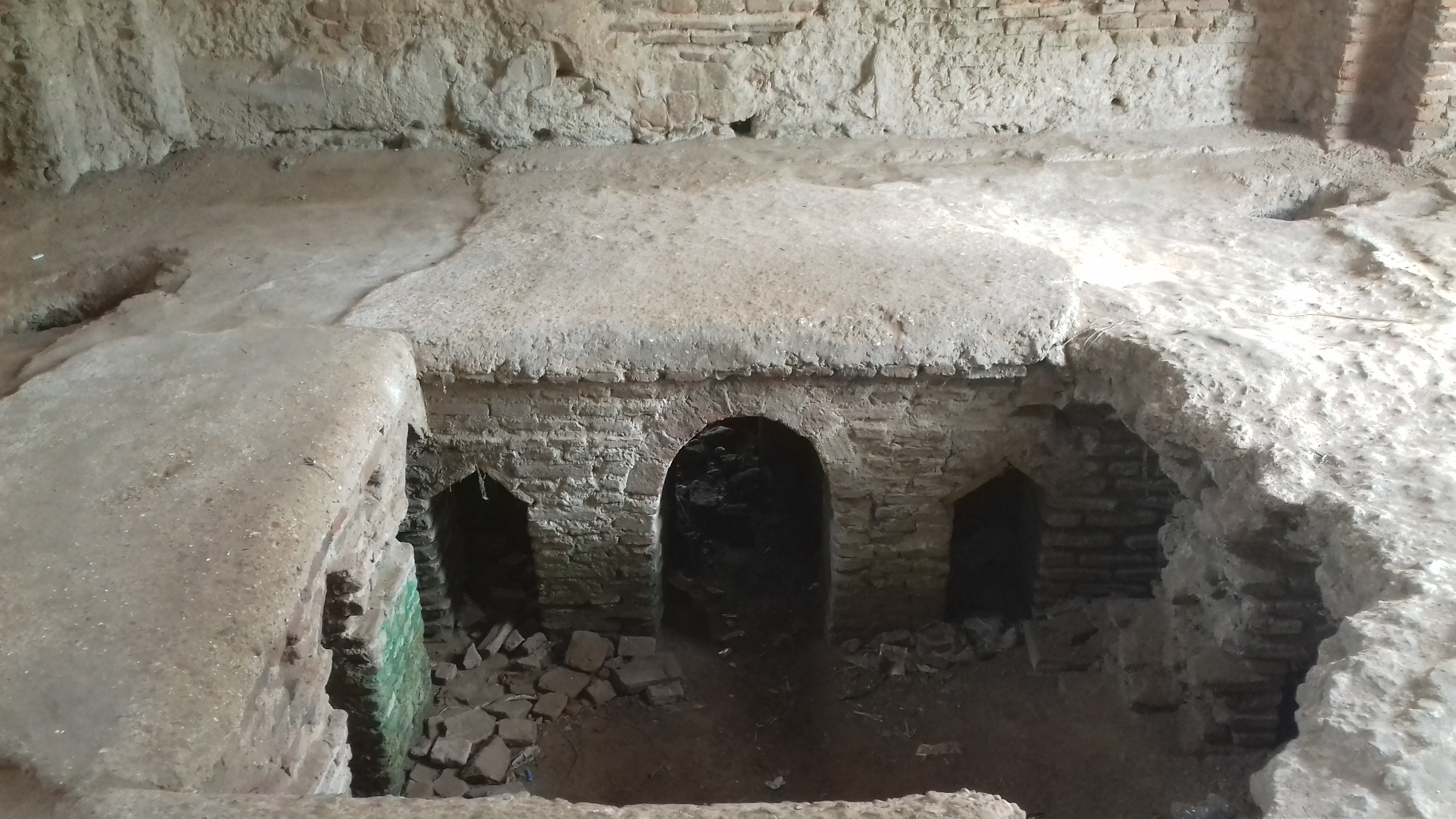
Hamam internal underground water tank

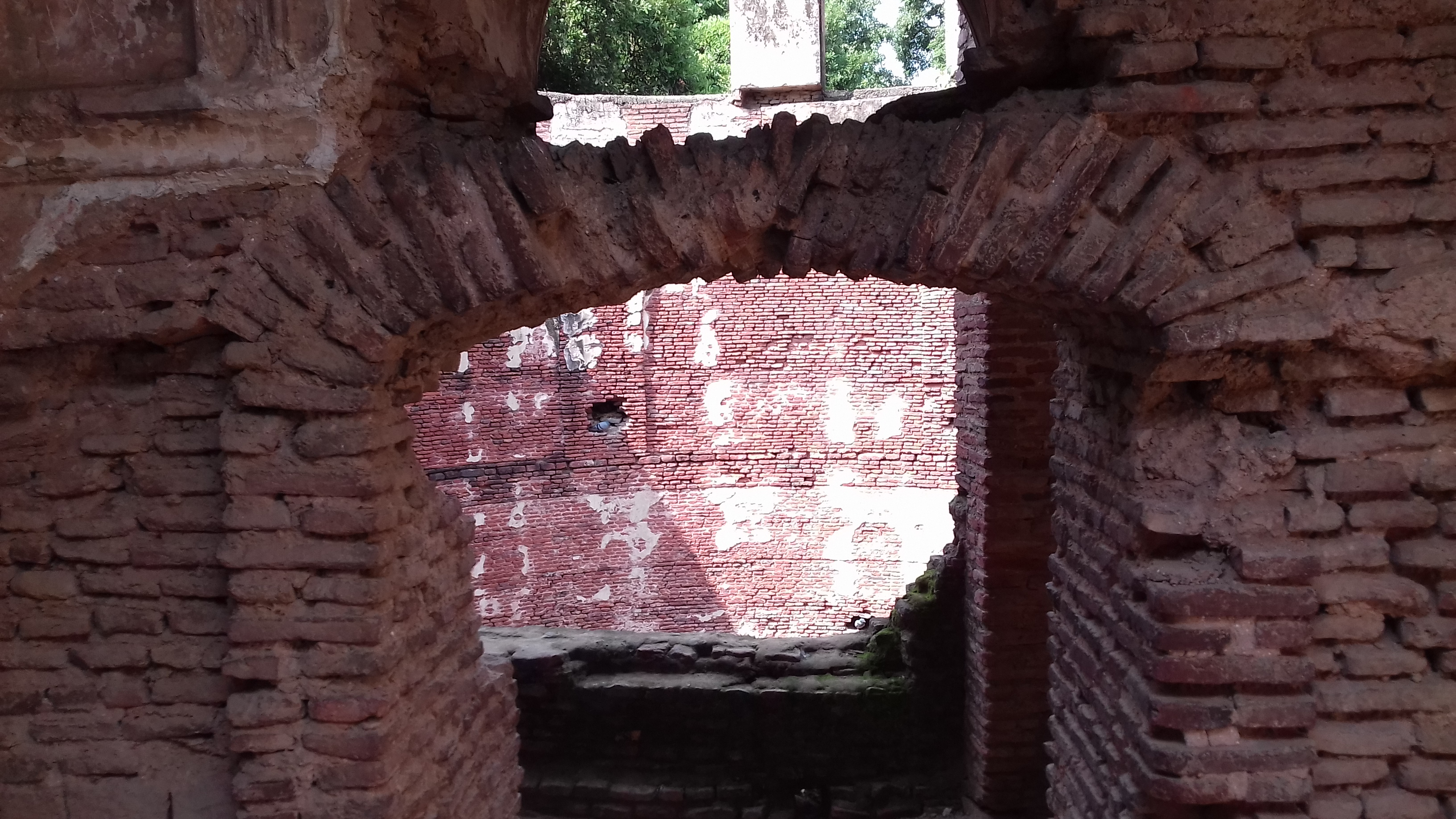
View of well from saradkhana

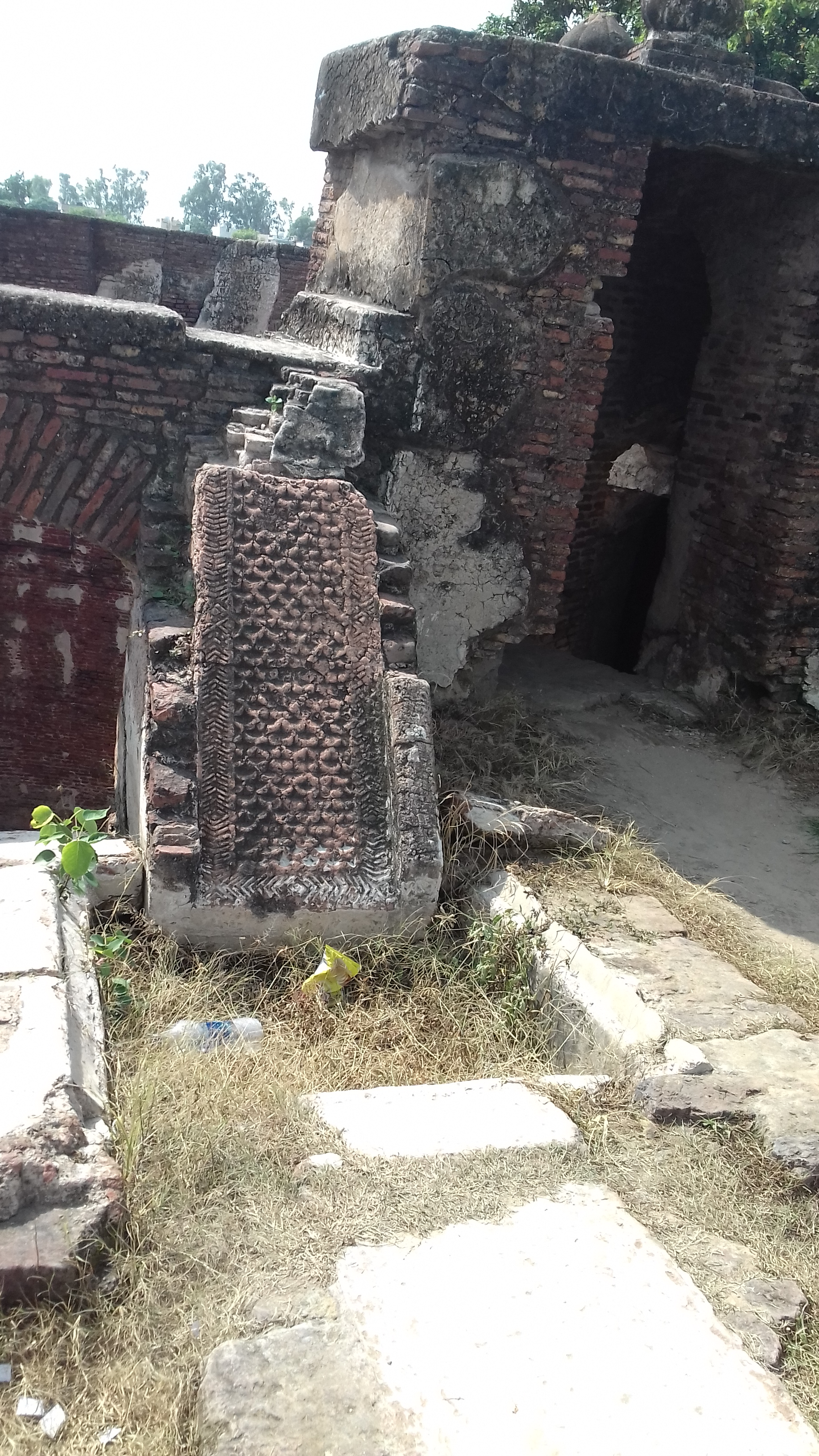
Sardkhana adjoining water channel

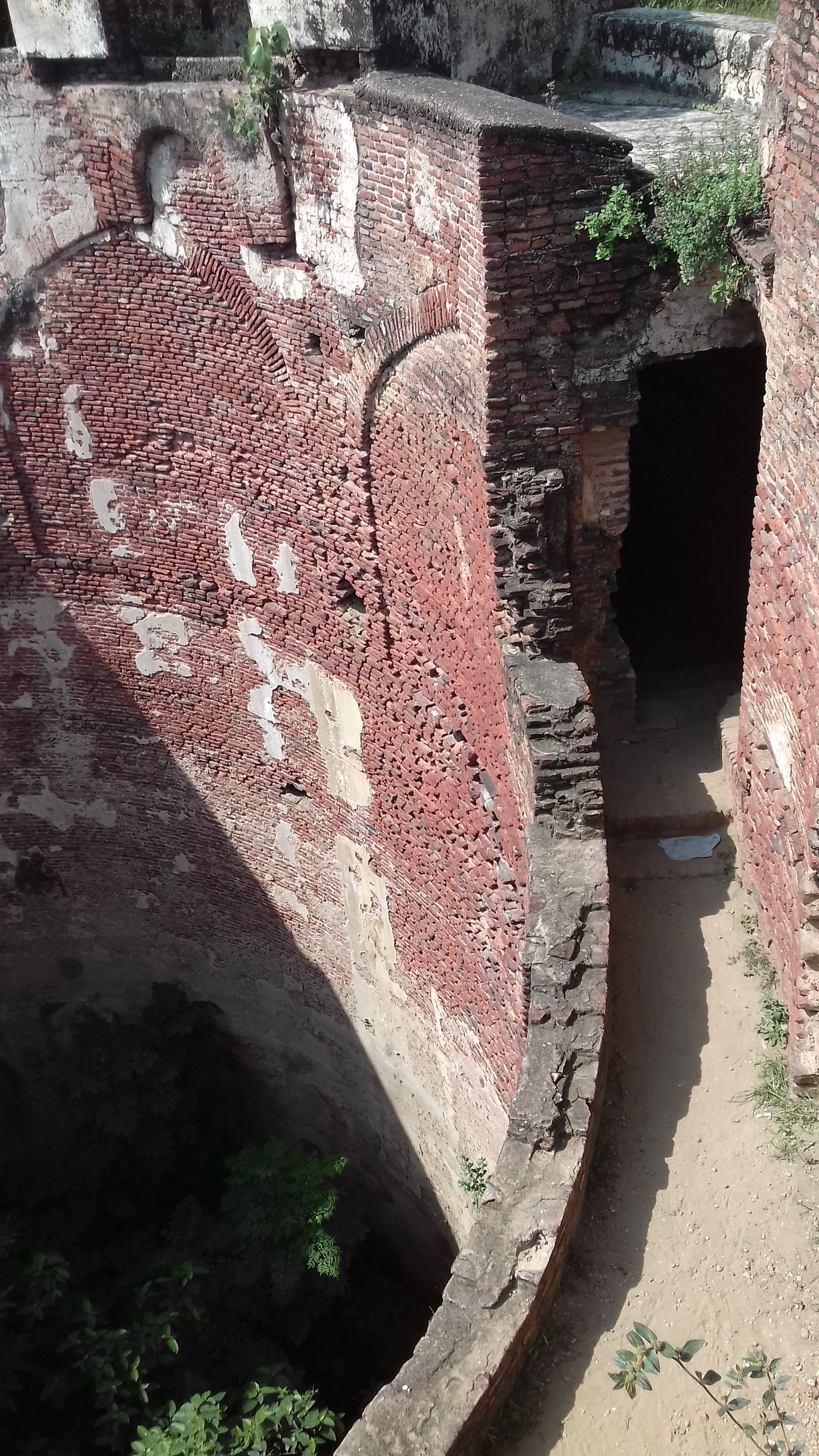
Aam Khas Bagh, Sirhind Wells Near Saradkhana ways adjoining well

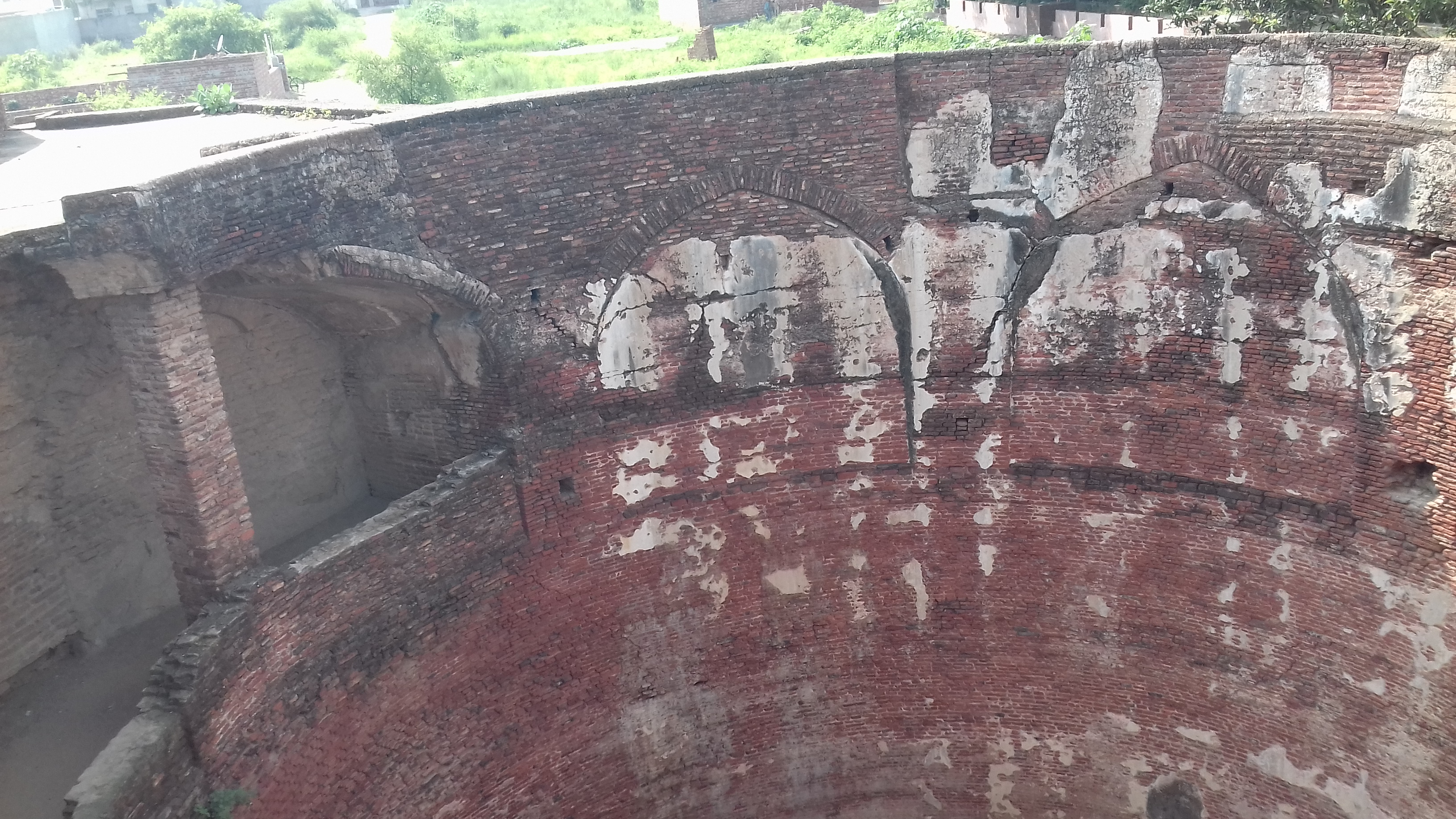
Aam Khas Bagh, Sirhind Wells Near Saradkhana 1

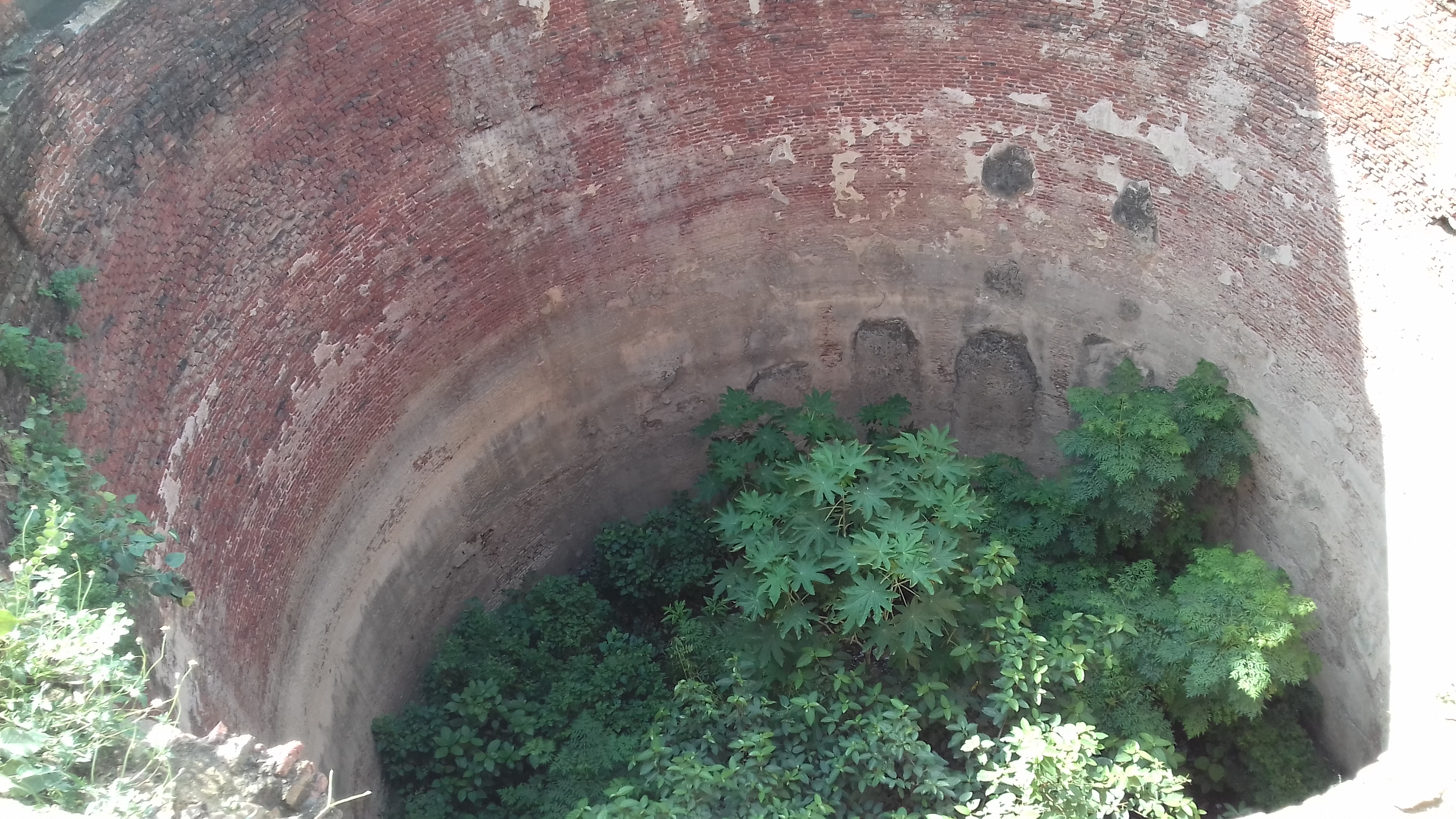
Aam Khas Bagh, Sirhind Wells Near Saradkhana

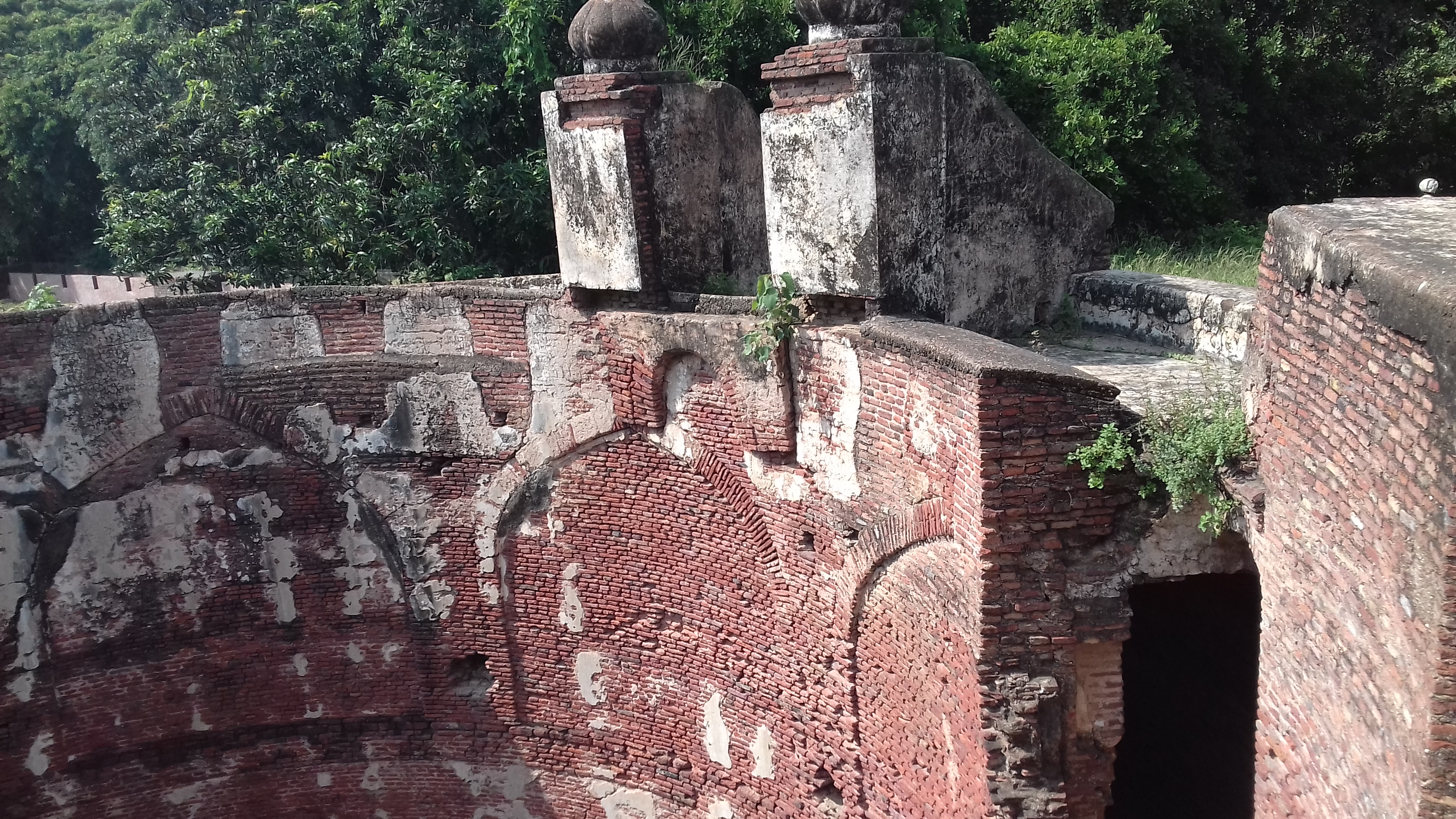
Aam Khas Bagh, Sirhind Wells Near Saradkhana with Pulleys to lift water

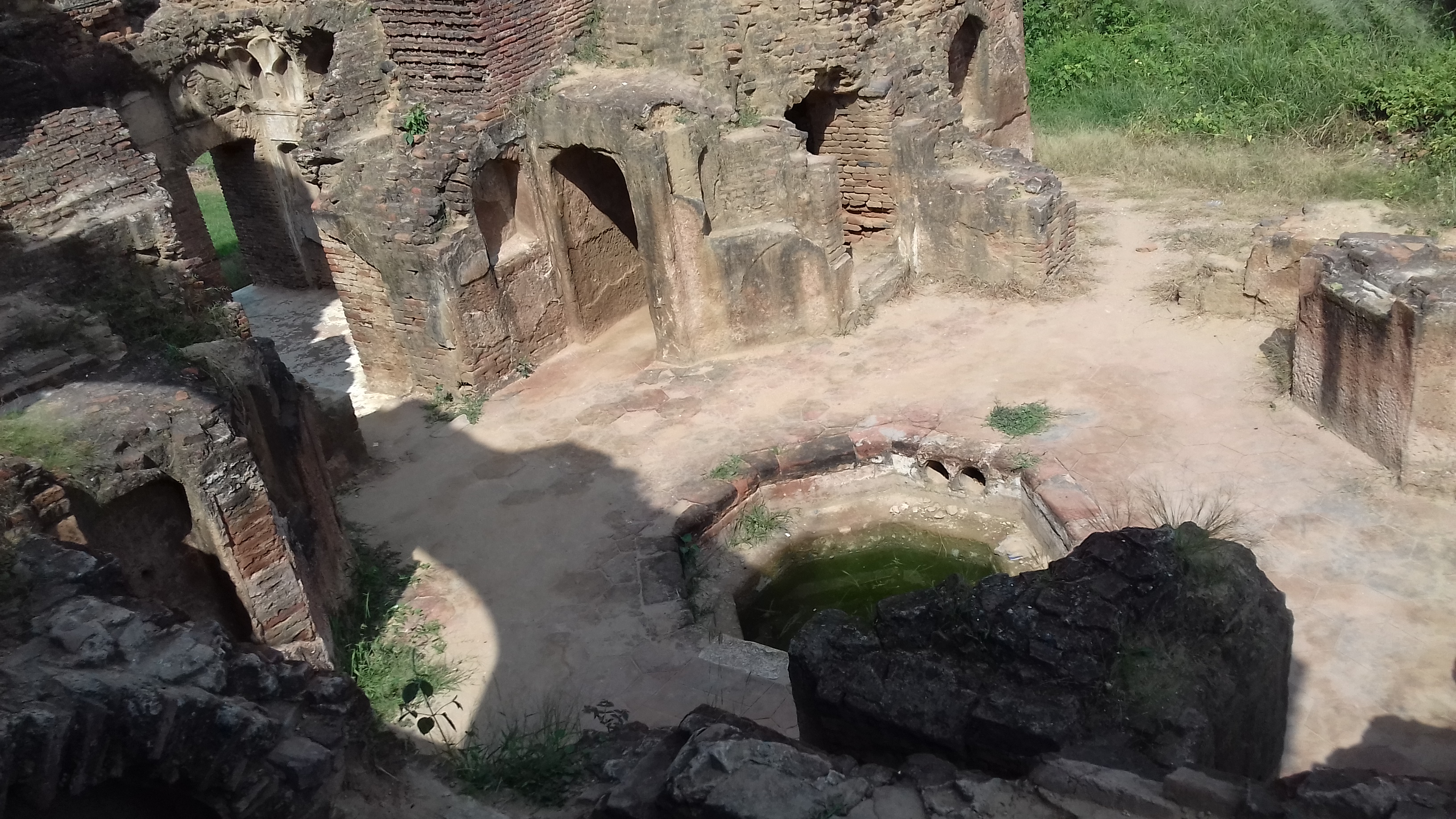
Aam Khas Bagh Sirhind Daulat Khana-Ekhas internal ruins

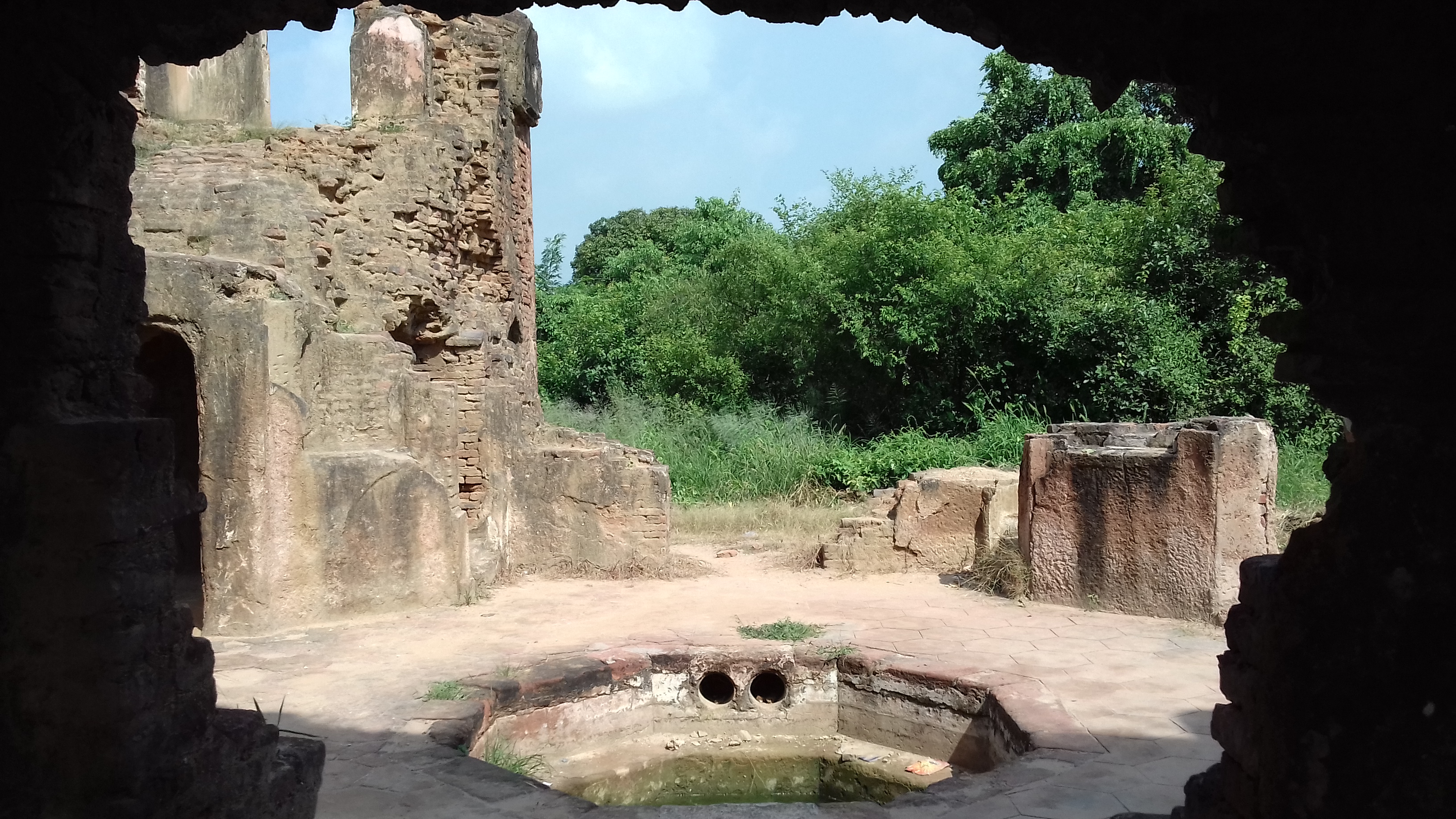
Aam Khas Bagh Sirhind Daulat Khana-Ekhas Inside

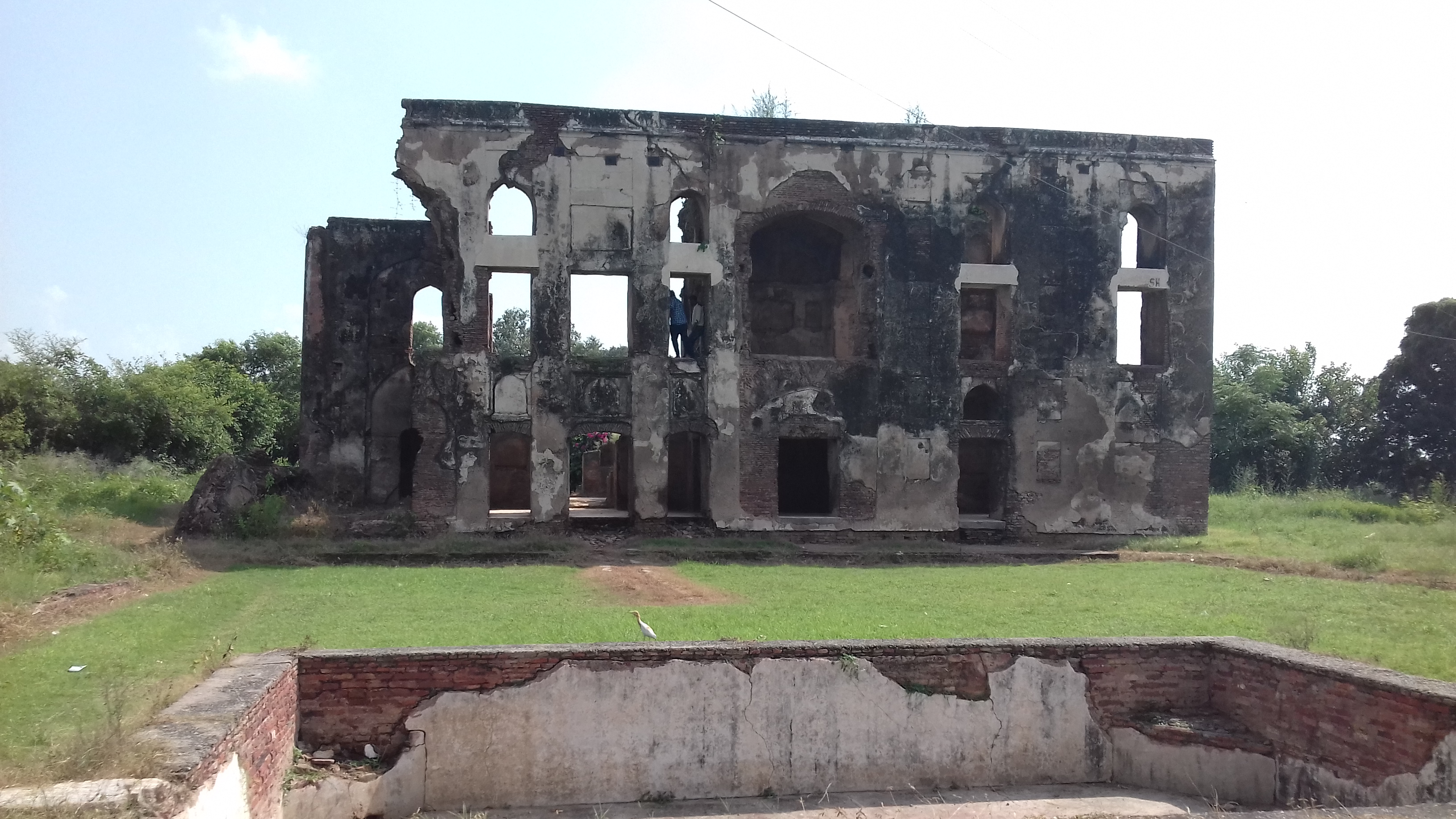
Aam Khas Bagh Sirhind Daulat Khana-Ekhas

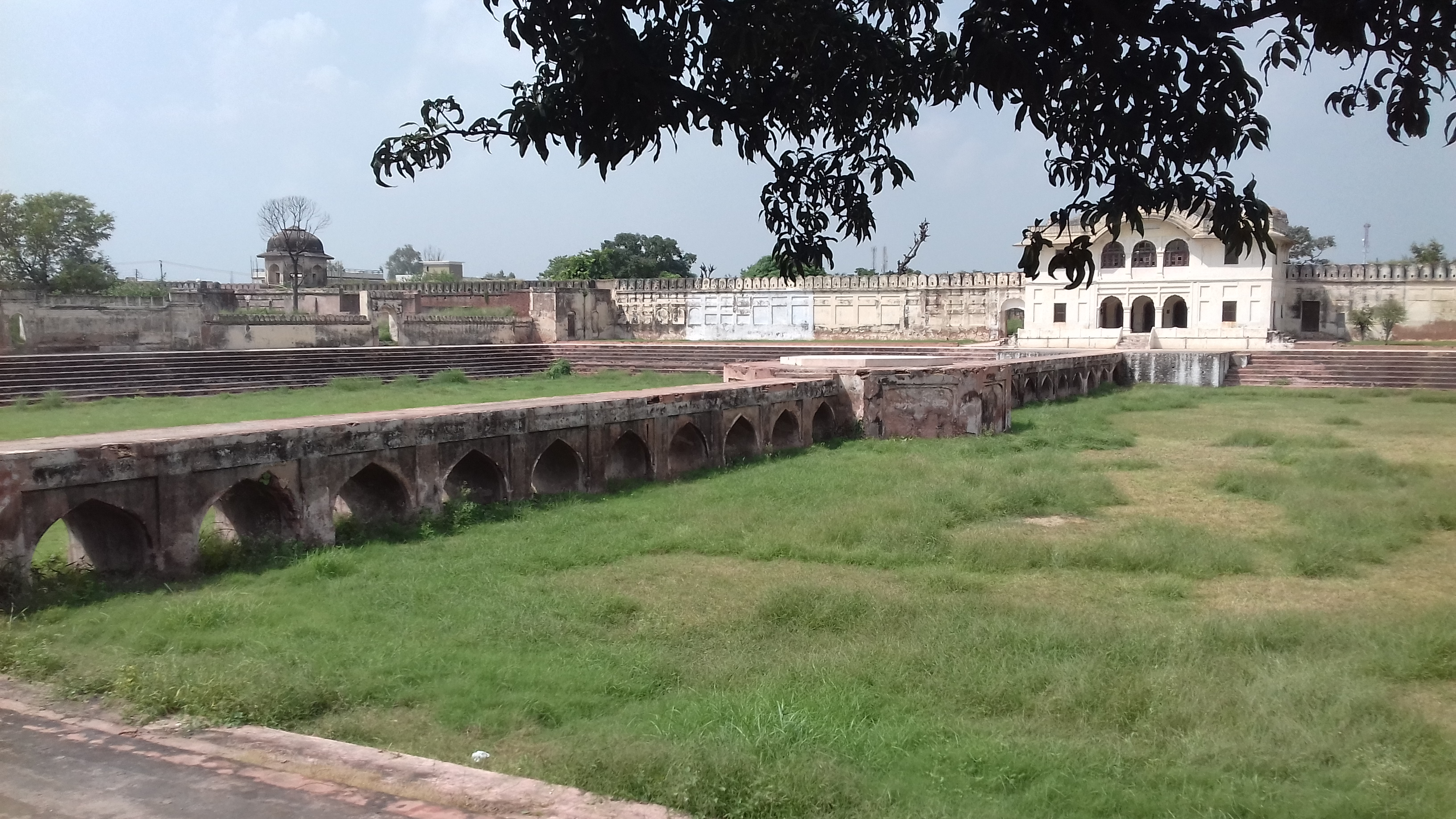
Aam Khas Bagh, Fatehgarh Sahib

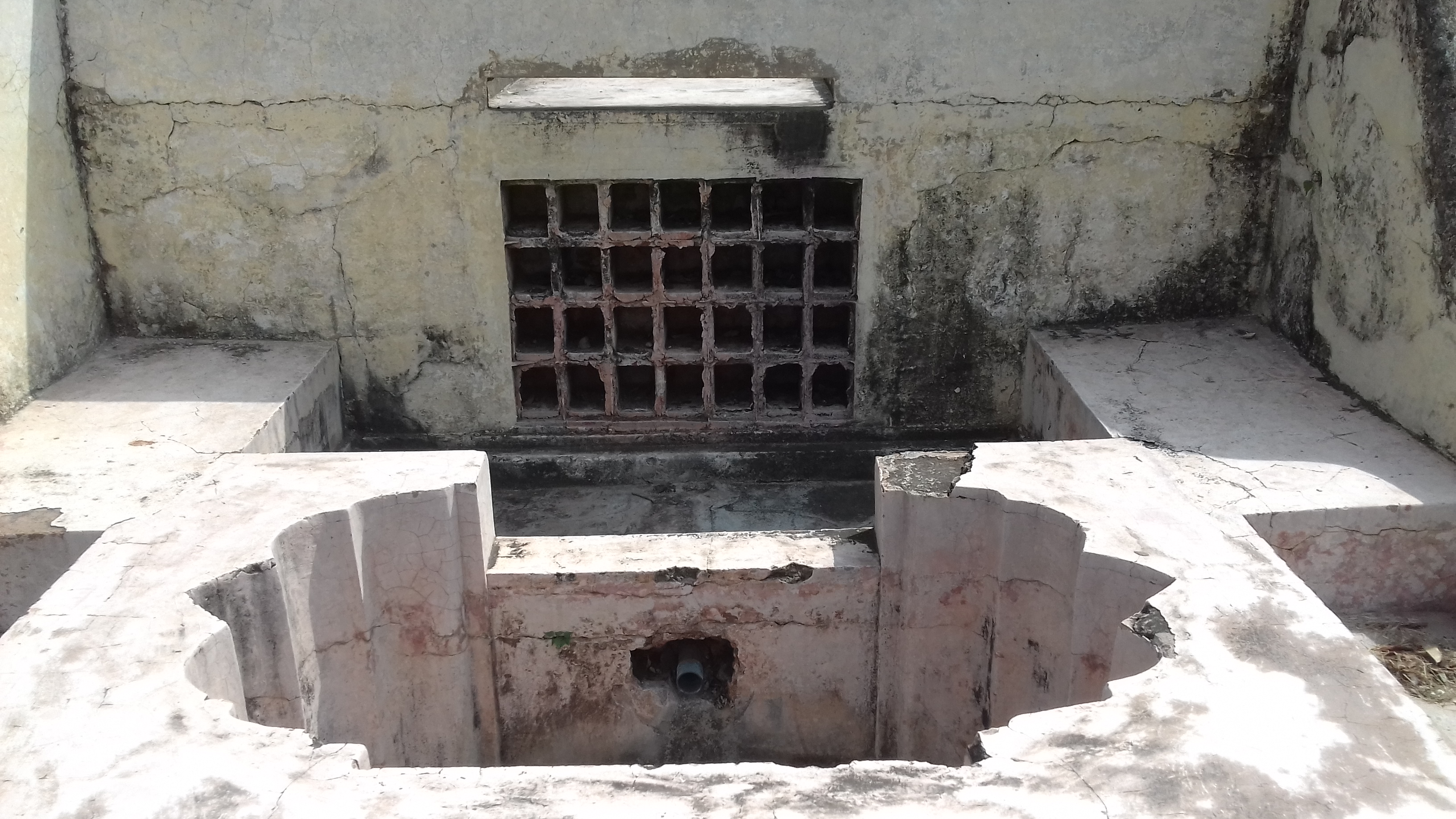
Water Channels in Aam Bagh Naugharana

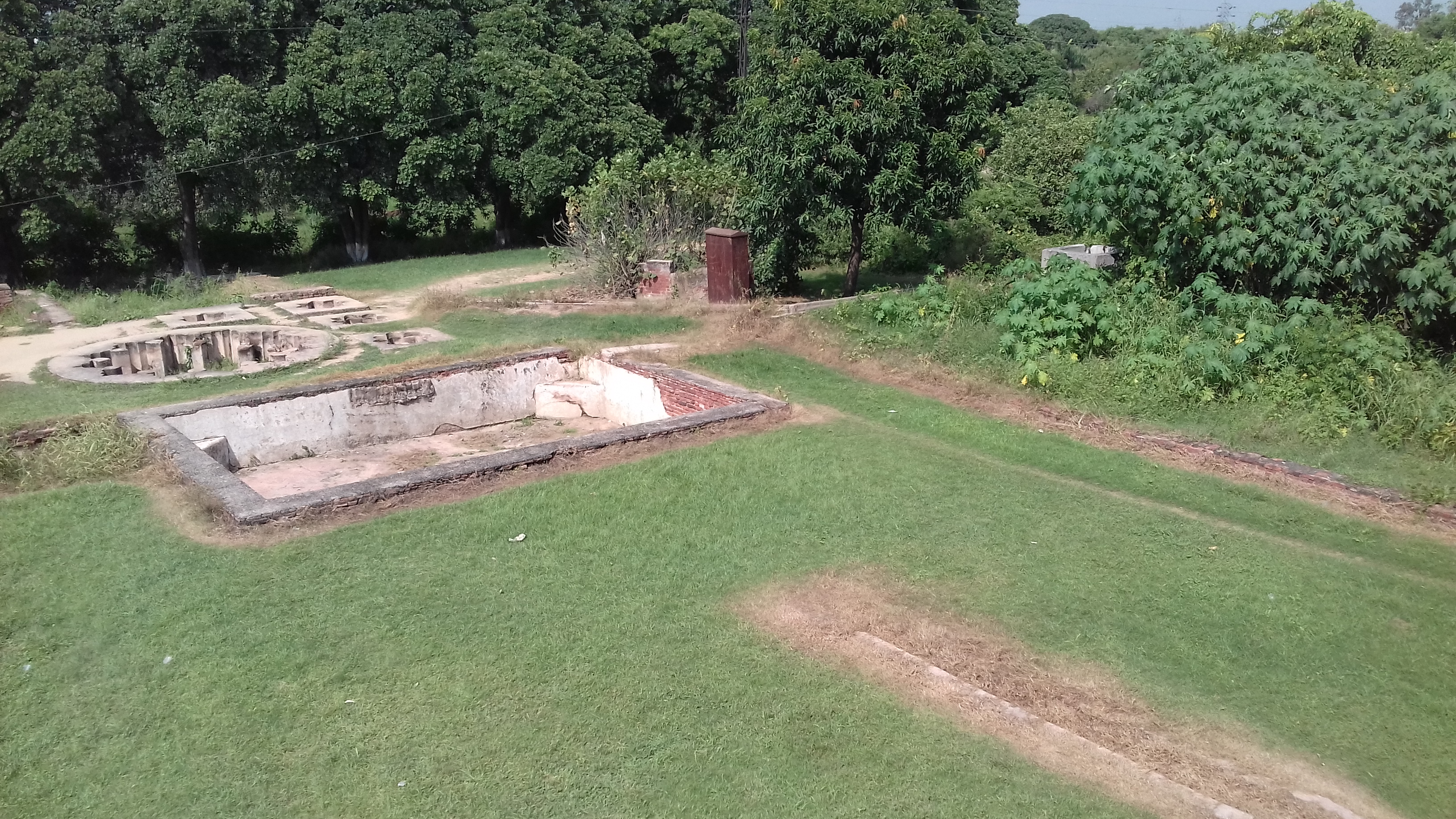
Water Channels in Aam Bagh in front of Sardkhana 2

== See also ==
- Gurdwara Fatehgarh Sahib
- Jahaz Haveli
