= Fatehgarh Sahib =

Fatehgarh Sahib Fatēgaṛh Sāhib (Punjabi)
- City
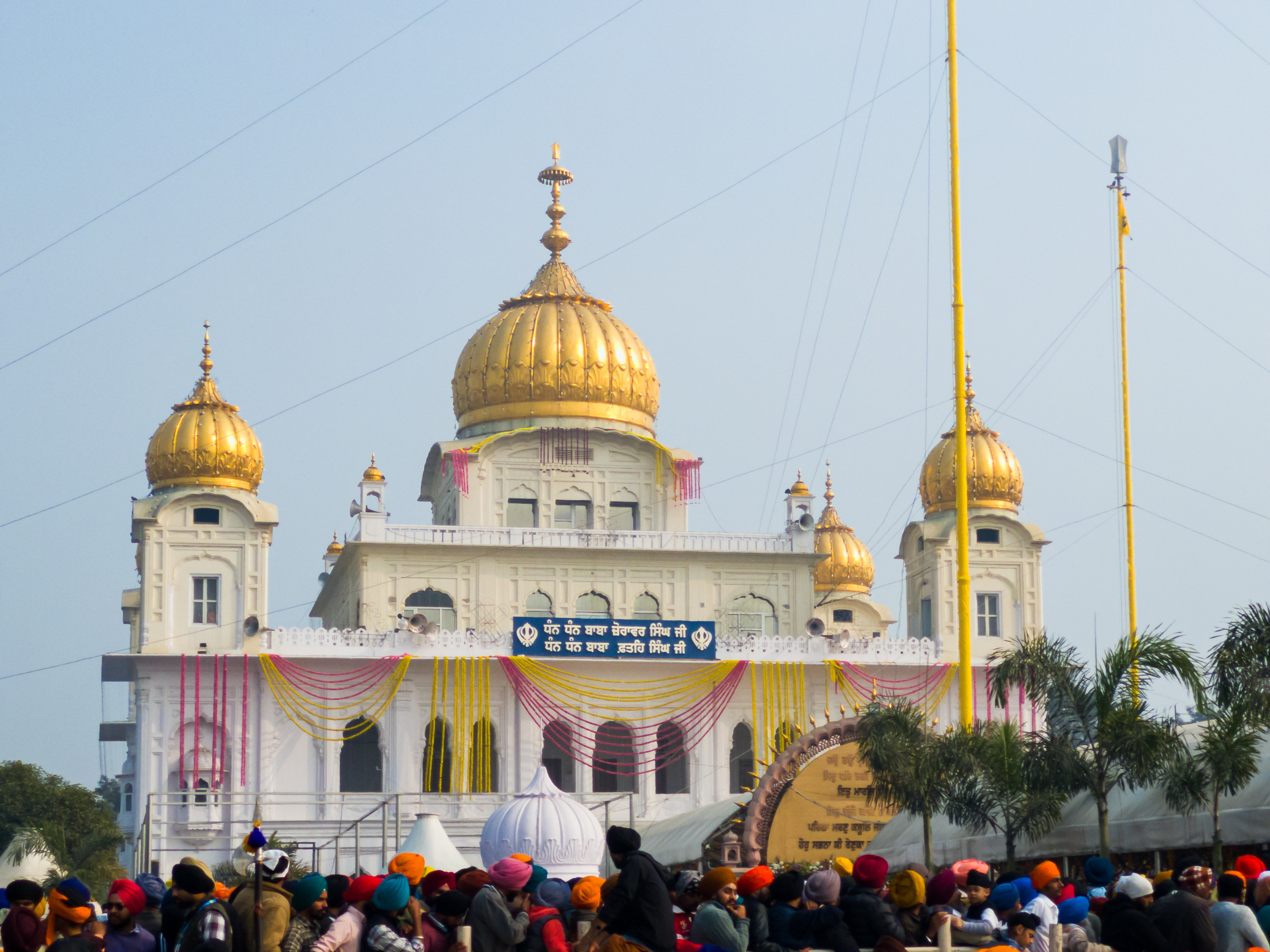
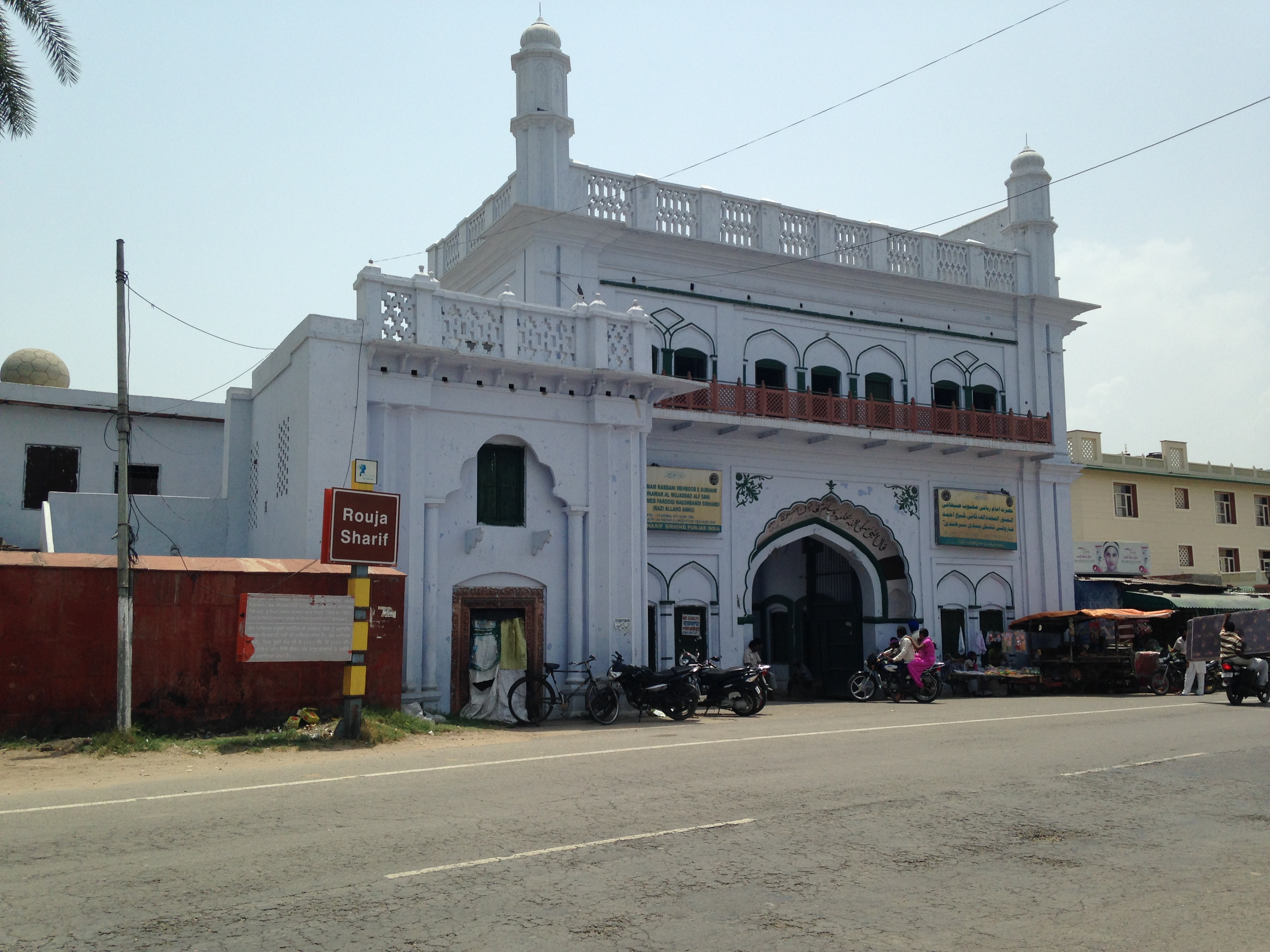
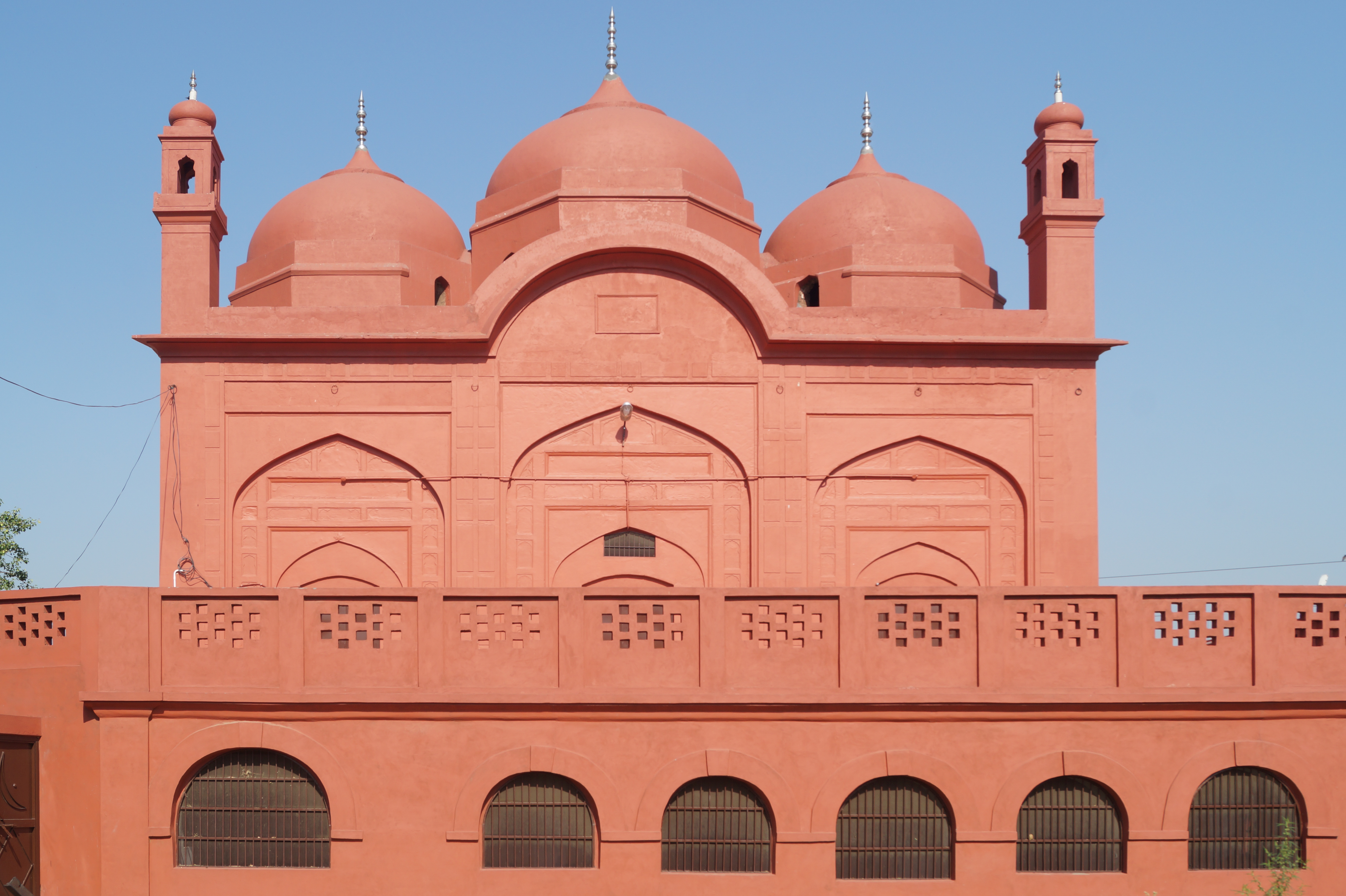
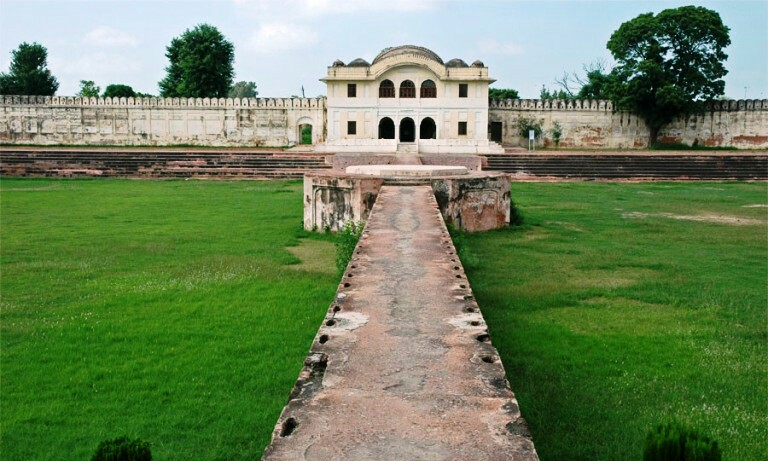
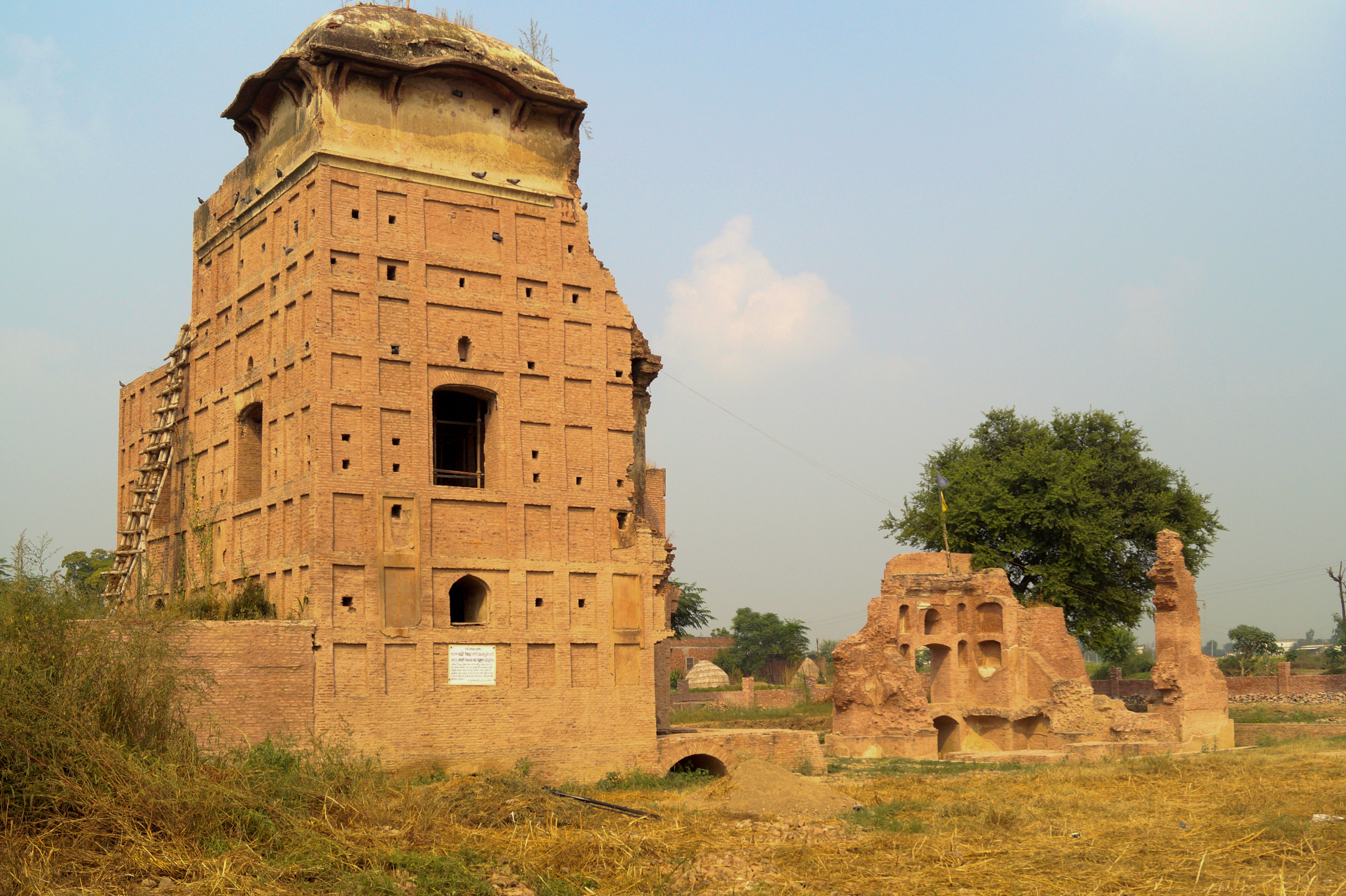
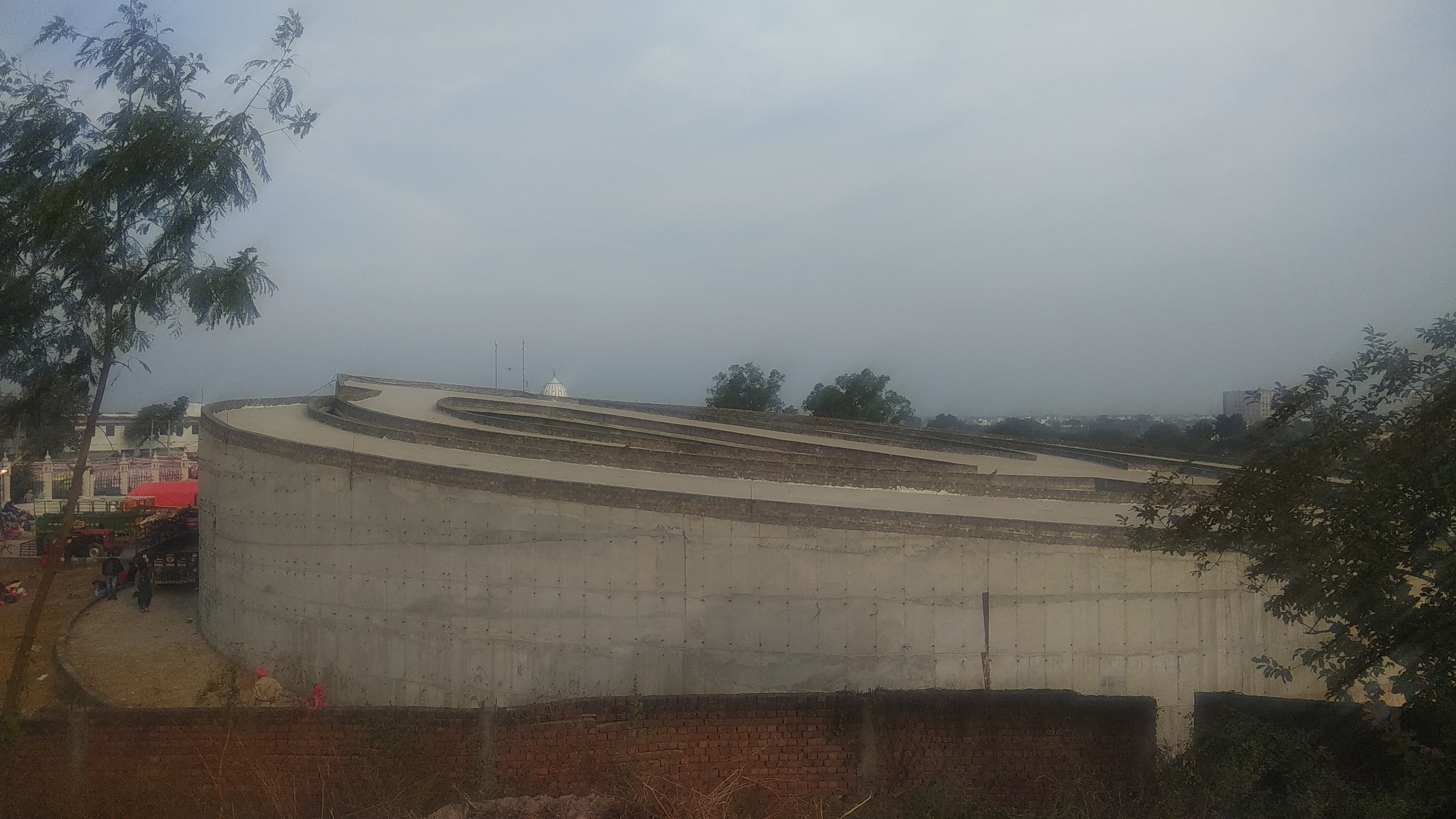
- Gurdwara Fatehgarh Sahib Rauza Sharif Allah Lal Masjid Aam Khas Bagh Jahaz Haveli Khanda Museum

- Location in Punjab, India Fatehgarh Sahib (Punjab)
- Coordinates: 30°38′50″N 76°23′35″E
- Country: India
- State: Punjab
- District: Fatehgarh Sahib
- Founder: Jassa Singh Ahluwalia
- Named for: Baba Fateh Singh, son of Guru Gobind Singh
- Elevation: 246 m (807 ft)

Population
  - Total: 50,788

Languages
  - Official: Punjabi
  - Native: Puadhi
- Time zone: UTC+5:30 (IST)
- PIN: 140406,140407
- Telephone code: +91-1763
- Vehicle registration: PB-23
- Website: www.fatehgarhsahib.nic.in

Fatehgarh Sahib (Punjabi pronunciation: [fə.t̪éː.gə́ɽᵊ sä́ːbᵊ]) is a city and a sacred pilgrimage site of Sikhism in the north west Indian state of Punjab. It is the headquarters of Fatehgarh Sahib district, located about 5 kilometres (3.1 mi) north of Sirhind. Fatehgarh Sahib is named after Fateh Singh, the 7-year-old son of Guru Gobind Singh, who was seized and buried alive, along with his 9-year-old brother Zoravar Singh, by the Mughals on the orders of governor Wazir Khan during the ongoing Mughal-Sikh wars of the early 18th century. The town experienced major historical events after the martyrdom of the two brothers in 1705, with frequent changes of control between the Sikhs and Mughals.

The town features historic Gurdwaras, including the underground Bhora Sahib marking the location where the two boys refused to convert to Islam and instead accepted being bricked up alive. In contemporary times, the town is the site of educational institutions such as the SGPC run Guru Granth Sahib University and Baba Banda Singh Bahadur Engineering College.

== History ==
The city is a historically important settlement 40 kilometres (25 mi) north of the city of Patiala and 42 kilometers (26 mi) west of Punjab's capital, Chandigarh. It is a major pilgrimage center in Sikhism.

The Gurdwara Fatehgarh Sahib is the major landmark in the town. It marks the location where two youngest sons of Guru Gobind Singh Ji – 7-year-old Baba Fateh Singh Ji and 9-year-old Baba Zorawar Singh Ji– were betrayed by their cook and servant Gangu to the Mughal army, seized, asked to convert to Islam and when they refused they were buried alive under the orders of Wazir Khan. Their martyrdom on 9 December 1705 has been remembered by the Sikhs by naming the site as Fatehgarh after the youngest boy killed, and by building a large Gurdwara in 1843. The town is also the location where the Sikhs took revenge by capturing it from Wazir Khan in 1710 and killing him. However, the Sikh militia was defeated again few years later and the town remained in the control of Muslim rulers, including later an appointee of Ahmed Shah Durrani till 1764, when Khalsa recaptured it by defeating and killing the appointee Zain Khan.

== Places of worship ==
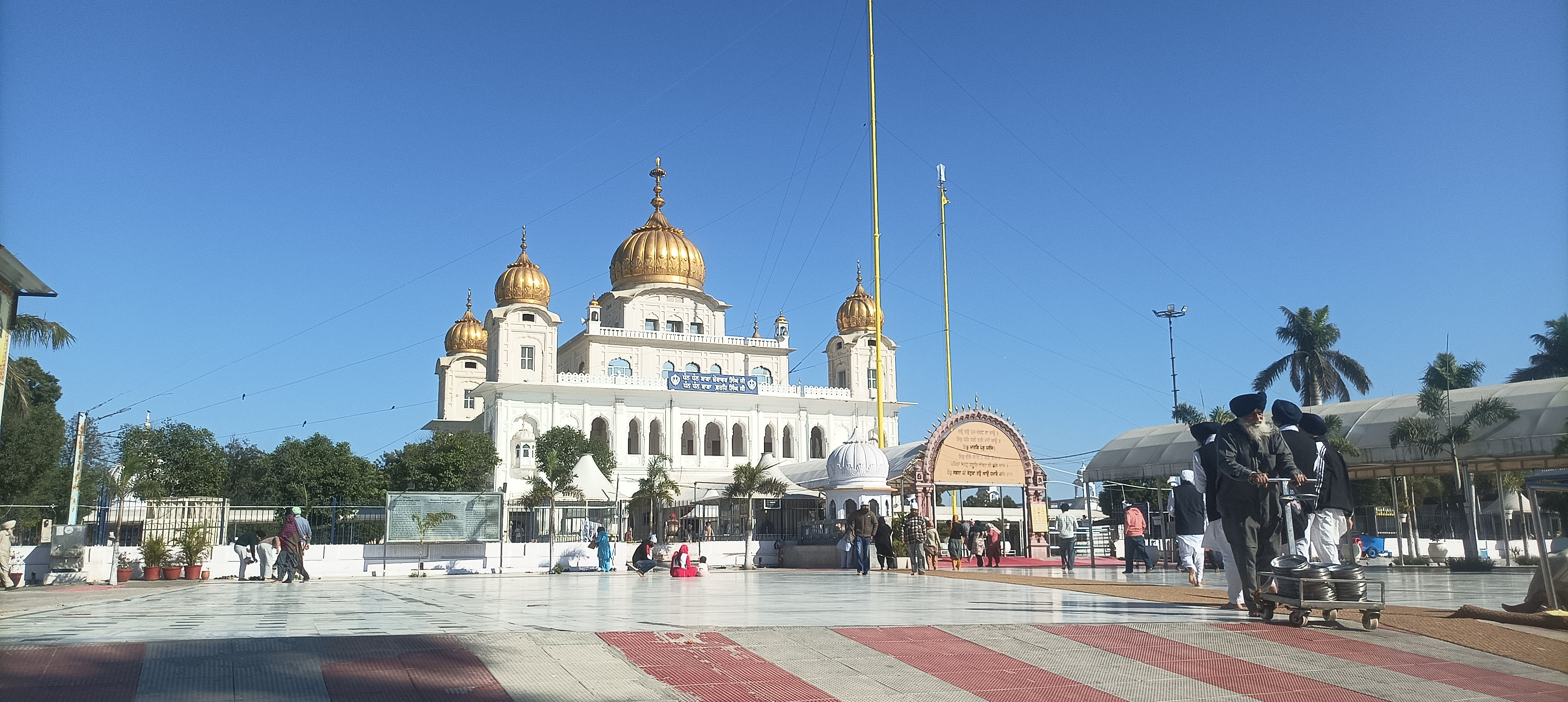
ਗੁਰਦੁਆਰਾ ਸ਼ਹੀਦੀ ਅਸਥਾਨ ਛੋਟੇ ਸਾਹਿਬਜ਼ਾਦੇ

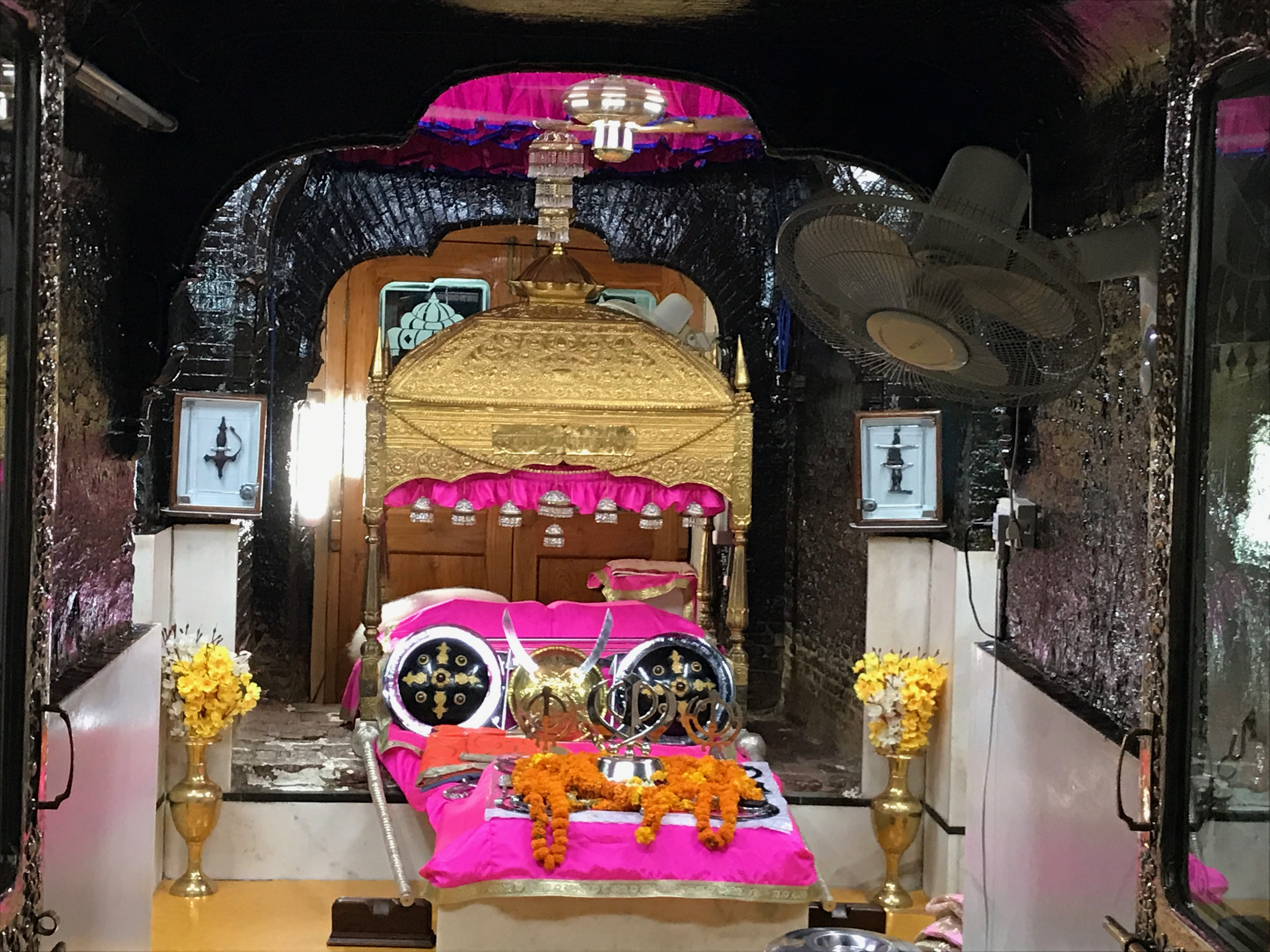
Bhora Sahib, the sanctum remembering the spot where two sons of Guru Gobind Singh were buried alive. The wall is visible to the side of the golden dome.

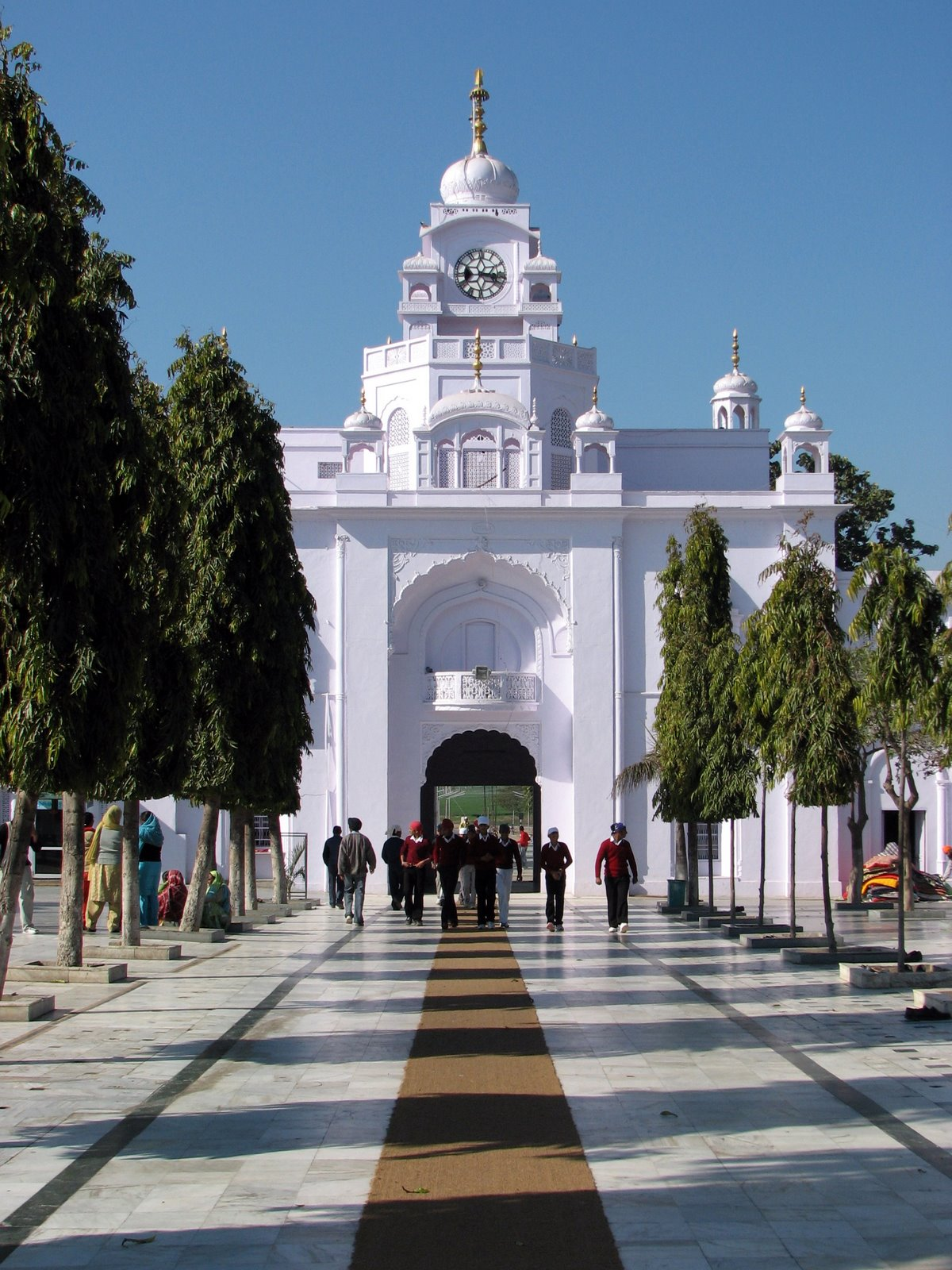
Backview of the entrance gateway to the Fatehgarh Sahib Gurdwaras complex, Punjab

The town is home to major Sikh Gurdwaras:

- Bhora Sahib: the underground location within Fatehgarh Sahib Gurdwara where the two sons were buried alive. This monument was built by Karam Singh of Patiala in early 19th-century.
- Fatehgarh Sahib Gurdwara: the main Sikh temple in the town, in whose basement is Bhora Sahib. The Gurdwara stands on a high point of the town, has an Indo-Islamic architecture with a square plan, a ribbed lotus dome and cusped arches. The floor is made of marble and is decorated with a mosaic. It is three storeyed consisting of a basement, a central pavilion and dome level above. The basement has a copy of the Sikh scripture, Khalsa swords, dagger and other holy historic relics. It is marked with silence, usually with visitors as well as pilgrims seated and praying. The upper level with the central pavilion also houses the Guru Granth Sahib and features kirtan singing. The upper levels and domes were added by Yadavinder Singh in 1955, after India gained its independence from the colonial British Empire.
- Gurdwara Jyoti Sarup lies about 1.5 kilometres (0.93 mi) southeast from Fatehgarh Sahib on the Sirhind-Chandigarh road. At this place, Mata Gujri – the mother of Guru Gobind Singh, and her two youngest grandchildren, Fateh Singh and Zorawar Singh were cremated.
- Gurdwara Bimangarh is close to the Fatehgarh Sahib Gurdwara. It is a location where the dead bodies of the two children and their grandmother was kept for the night before the cremation.
- Banda Bahadur platform is believed in the Sikh tradition as the place where 6,000 Sikhs died fighting the Muslim army in the Battle of Chapparchiri.

There also exists remains of an ancient Royal inn in the city named Aam Khas Bagh that was initially built by Akbar and rebuilt by Mughal Emperor Shah Jahan.

Shaheedi Jor Mel Every year between 11th and 14th of the month of Poh (usually about 25 to 27 December), Fatehgarh Sahib is the pilgrimage site for many Sikhs who visit it to remember the martyrdom, locally known as Shaheedi Jor Mela of the sons of Guru Gobind Singh.

== Todar Mal Haveli ==
Todarmal, a Jain merchant, who is most remembered for defying the Mughals by arranging for the cremation of young martyred sons of Guru Gobind Singh and his mother, in exchange for gold coins, had a haveli that still exists as Todar Mal Haveli.

== See also ==
- Anandpur Sahib
- Harmandir Sahib
- Sirhind-Fategarh
- History of Sirhind
