= Fatehgarh Sahib district =

- District of Punjab
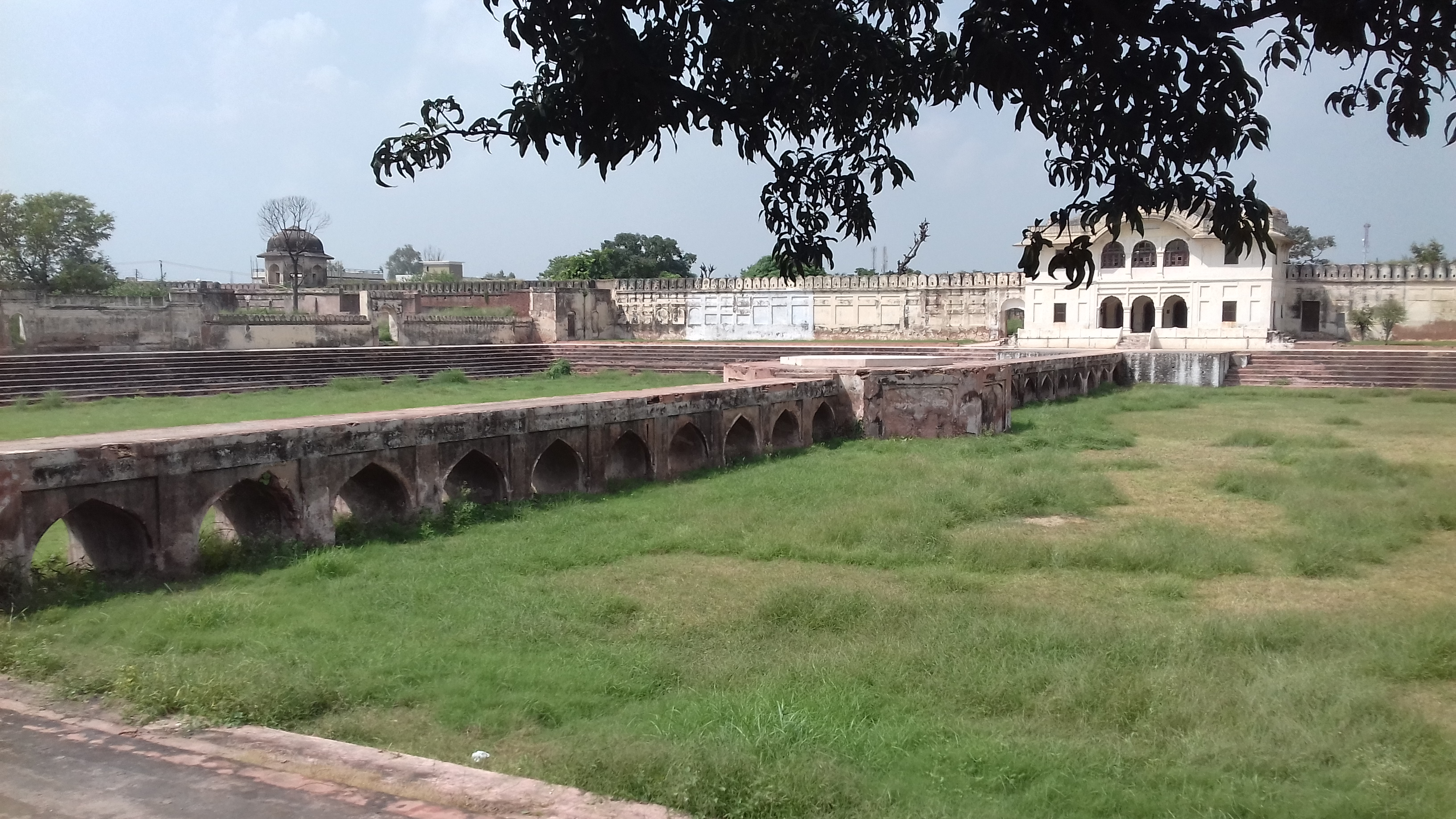
- Aam Khas Bagh, Fatehgarh Sahib
- Nickname: FGS
- Location in Punjab
- Coordinates: 30.38°N 76.23°E
- Country: India
- State: Punjab
- Headquarters: Fatehgarh Sahib

Population (2011 census)
  - Total: 600,163

Languages
  - Official: Punjabi
  - Regional: Puadhi
- Time zone: UTC+5:30 (IST)
- Postal code: 140406
- Vehicle registration: PB-23
- Website: fatehgarhsahib.nic.in

Fatehgarh Sahib district is one of the twenty-three districts of the state of Punjab, India, with its headquarters in Fatehgarh Sahib and the municipal council in Sirhind. The district is part of the Patiala division.

The district came into existence on 13 April 1992, Baisakhi Day and derives its name from Sahibzada Fateh Singh, the youngest son of 10th Guru Gobind Singh, who along with his brother was bricked-up alive on the orders of Wazir Khan, the Mughal Governor of Sirhind, in 1704. At the site the Gurudwara Fatehgarh Sahib now stands.

As of 2011, it is the second least populous district of Punjab (out of 22), after Barnala.

== History ==
During the British era, this region was primarily part of the princely states of Patiala State and Nabha State. It was then known as the Bassi District, comprising the Sirhind and Dhuri tehsils of Patiala State—though Dhuri is not part of the District today, while Amloh formed a separate district under Nabha State.

After Patiala, Nabha acceded to the Dominion of India, the princely states were reorganized, and Fatehgarh Sahib became a district within the newly formed Patiala and East Punjab States Union (PEPSU). However, in 1953, this district was merged into Patiala District.

The region later regained district status on 13 April 1992, on the occasion of Baisakhi Day.

== Important cities and towns ==
- Amloh
- Bassi Pathana
- Khamanon
- Mandi Gobindgarh
- Sirhind-Fategarh
- Fatehgarh Sahib

== Administration ==
The district is divided into four Tehsils: Amloh, Bassi Pathana, Khamanon and Fatehgarh Sahib, which are further divided into two sub-tehsils: Mandi Gobindgarh and Chanarhal Kalan. It also comprises five blocks, Amloh, Bassi Pathana, Khamanon, Sirhind and Khera.

=== Subdistricts of Fatehgarh Sahib district ===
According to the Indian government's integrated online directory, Fatehgarh Sahib district is divided into the following subdistricts (tehsils/subdivisions) and blocks:

- Subdistricts
  1. Amloh
  2. Bassi Pathana
  3. Fatehgarh Sahib
  4. Khamanon
- Blocks:
  1. Amloh
  2. Bassi Pathana
  3. Khamano
  4. Khera
  5. Sirhind

== Demographics ==
Historical population
Year	Pop.	±% p.a.
1951	191,919	—
1961	246,234	+2.52%
1971	305,407	+2.18%
1981	389,139	+2.45%
1991	455,312	+1.58%
2001	538,470	+1.69%
2011	600,163	+1.09%

According to the 2011 census Fatehgarh Sahib district has a population of 600,163. This gives it a ranking of 525th in India (out of a total of 640). The district has a population density of 508 inhabitants per square kilometre (1,320/sq mi) . Its population growth over the decade 2001-2011 was 11.39%. Fatehgarh Sahib has a sex ratio of 871 females for every 1000 males, and a literacy rate of 80.3%. Scheduled Castes made up 32.07% of the population.

=== Gender ===
The table below shows the sex ratio of Fatehgarh Sahib district through decades.

Sex ratio of Fatehgarh Sahib district
Census year	Ratio
2011	871
2001	854
1991	871
1981	841
1971	831
1961	815
1951	773

The table below shows the child sex ratio of children below the age of 6 years in the rural and urban areas of Fatehgarh Sahib district.

Child sex ratio of children below the age of 6 years in Fatehgarh Sahib district
Year	Urban	Rural
2011	857	835
2001	791	757

=== Religions ===
Religion in Fatehgarh Sahib district (2011)
	Percent
Sikhism	71.23%
Hinduism	25.47%
Islam	2.80%
Others	0.49%

Religion in tehsils of Fatehgarh Sahib district (2011)
Tehsil	Sikhism (%)	Hinduism (%)	Islam (%)	Others (%)
Amloh	56.38	39.55	3.56	0.51
Fatehgarh Sahib	75.98	20.41	2.94	0.67
Bassi Pathana	80.53	17.10	2.06	0.31
Khamanon	85.23	12.97	1.52	0.28

The table below shows the population of different religions in absolute numbers in the urban and rural areas of Fatehgarh Sahib district.

Absolute numbers of different religious groups in Fatehgarh Sahib district
Religion	Urban (2011)	Rural (2011)	Urban (2001)	Rural (2001)
Hindu	1,02,590	50,261	81,298	41,358
Sikh	76,424	3,51,097	65,935	3,35,237
Muslim	5,330	11,478	3,349	9,440
Christian	513	1,185	270	815
Other religions	625	660	239	100

=== Languages ===
Languages of Fatehgarh Sahib district (2011)
1. Punjabi (89.9%)
2. Hindi (9.15%)
3. Others (0.93%)

At the time of the 2011 census, 89.92% of the population spoke Punjabi and 9.15% Hindi as their first language.

== Health ==
The table below shows the number of road accidents and people affected in Fatehgarh Sahib district by year.

Road accidents and people affected in Fatehgarh Sahib district by year
Year	Accidents	Killed	Injured	Vehicles Involved
2022	219	161	134	219
2021	229	166	110	308
2020	212	159	109	183
2019	222	151	182	218

== Politics ==
No.	Constituency	Name of MLA	Party	Bench
54	Bassi Pathana (SC)	Rupinder Singh	Aam Aadmi Party	Government
55	Fatehgarh Sahib	Lakhbir Singh Rai	Aam Aadmi Party	Government
56	Amloh	Gurinder Singh Garry	Aam Aadmi Party	Government

== Notable individuals ==
- Giani Ditt Singh, scholar, poet, editor and eminent Singh Sabha reformer
- Santokh Singh Dhir, a Punjabi writer and poet
- Tarsem Jassar (Songwriter, Singer, Actor).
- Dilpreet Dhillon (Singer, Actor)
- Babbu Maan (Singer)
