= Shaheedi Jor Mela =

Annual religious congregation

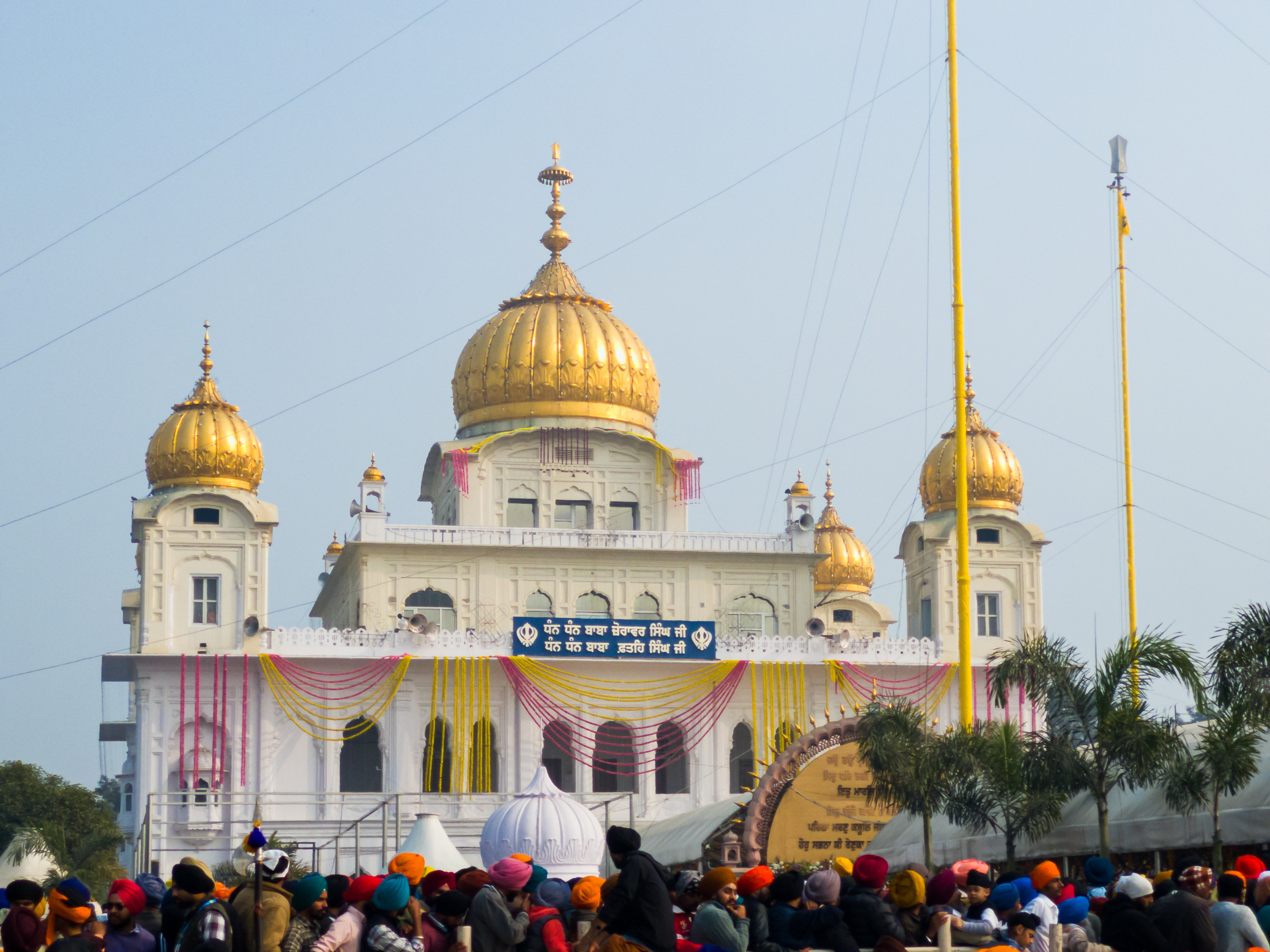
Gurdwara Fatehgarh Sahib, Punjab

Shaheedi Jor Mela, also known as Shaheedi Sabha, is a three-day annual religious congregation (get-together) organised every year in December at Gurdwara Fatehgarh Sahib, in the Fatehgarh Sahib district of Punjab, India to pay homage to the martyrdom of Chhotte Sahibzade Baba Zorawar Singh and Baba Fateh Singh, the youngest sons of the 10th sikh guru Guru Gobind Singh.

== Martyrdom ==
Zorawar Singh and Fateh Singh (aged 9 and 7 years respectively) along with Mata Gujri, mother of Guru Gobind Singh were imprisoned by the governor of Sirhind, Wazir Khan. He offered them treasure and easy lives if they would only convert to Islam, but they refused and stuck their faith in Sikhism. They were entombed alive by being bricked into a wall on 26 December 1705, but the wall collapsed. Gurdwara Fatehgarh Sahib, 5 km (3.1 mi) north of the Sirhind marks the site of their live entombment. Their mortal remains were cremated at a nearby place, where Gurdwara Jyoti Sarup is situated.

== Sabha schedule ==
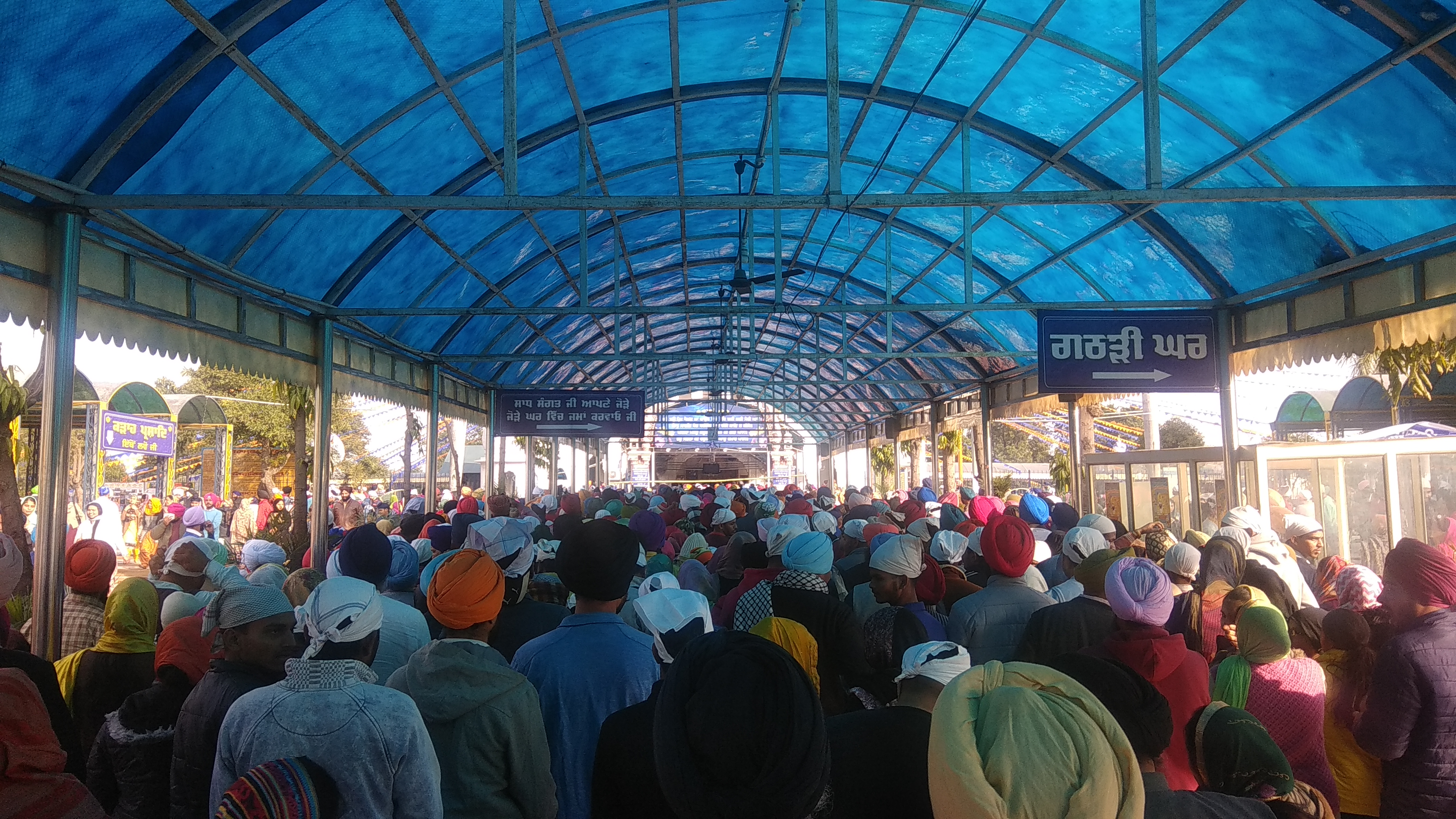
Sikh sangat at Gurdwara Fatehgarh Sahib

The first day of the sabha is observed purely in religious spirits. Earlier on 2nd day of Sabha, rallies and meetings were held by various political parties. But recently all political parties have stopped organizing conferences, to pay the tributes to Chhotte Sahibzade peacefully. Lakhs pray at Gurdwara Fatehgarh Sahib, Gurdwara Jyoti Sarup and Gurdwara Thanda Burj on this historic occasion every year during this three-day Sabha.

Each year, the district administration would do special arrangements for devotees and people visiting the sabha like parking areas, controlling flow of traffic by setting up special barricades and nakas, medical & emergency services and by deploying heavy police force for security. The Shiromani Gurdwara Parbandhak Committee has been arranging deewan, where the Sikh preachers, ragis, dhadi jathas use traditional music to retell the history of the Sikh. Although Sabha is a religious event, a heavy police force is normally deployed all around the Sabha site.

== Guru ka langar ==
People of villages of adjoining areas organise Langar which is served on the way to lakhs arriving here. The villagers pool grains, vegetables, milk and other eatables and prepare the langar for devotees locally known as sangat. Women folk prepare food for langar in collective kitchen in open area on the roadside and men serve it to the sangat coming from far away areas on Buses, Trucks, trolleys and other means of transportation.

== See also ==
- Chaar Sahibzaade, a 3D Punjabi animated film
- Saka Sirhind
- Battle of Chamkaur
- Rauza Sharif
- Moti Ram Mehra
