= Martyrdom in Sikhism =

Martyrdom is a fundamental institution of Sikhism. Sikh festivals are largely focused on the lives of the Sikh gurus and Sikh martyrs. Their martyrdoms are regarded as instructional ideals for Sikhs, and have greatly influenced Sikh culture and practices.

The term shahidi has been used by Sikhs since the 19th century to describe the act of martyrdom. A martyr is sometimes called a shahid (Punjabi: Gurmukhi- ਸ਼ਹੀਦ, Shahmukhi- شہید).

== History ==
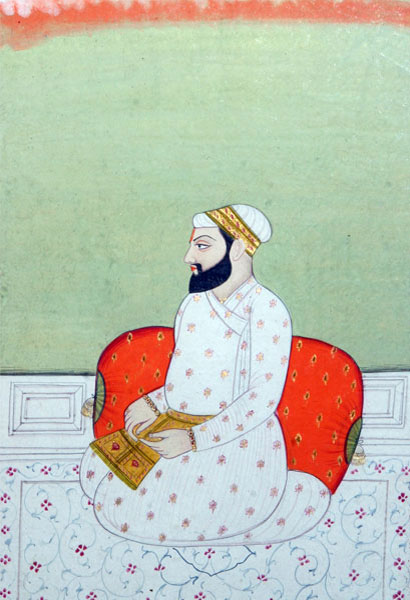
Guru Arjan was the first of two Gurus martyred in the Sikh faith

Martyrdom is a fundamental institution of the Sikh faith. For the Sikh, the perfect martyr or shahid is one who died not just in battle but also one who suffered death by refusing to renounce his faith, tenets and principles. The Sikh experience through the years gave rise to this type of ideal martyrdom.

Qazi Rukunudin (alternatively spelt as Qazi Ruknuddin) was the first Sikh martyr at the time of Guru Nanak. Qazi Rukunudin became a Sikh, when Guru Nanak visited Arabia during his fourth Udasi. Later, Amir-e-Makkah asked him to leave Sikhism but Qazi refused to disown his faith, then 7 orders were issued against him mentioning different types of tortures and method of killing him. Qazi Rukunudin was martyred around 1510-11.

Bhai Taru was the second Sikh martyr at the time of Guru Nanak Dev (1469-1539). Bhai spoke against Babur, the Mughal emperor and he was set on fire by soldiers of Babur. Bhai Taru Popat was Martyred in the year 1526. The martyrdom of Guru Arjan in the 17th century is regarded as a key moment in Sikh tradition which has influenced Sikh practices and beliefs, helping define a deliberately-separate and militant Sikh community.

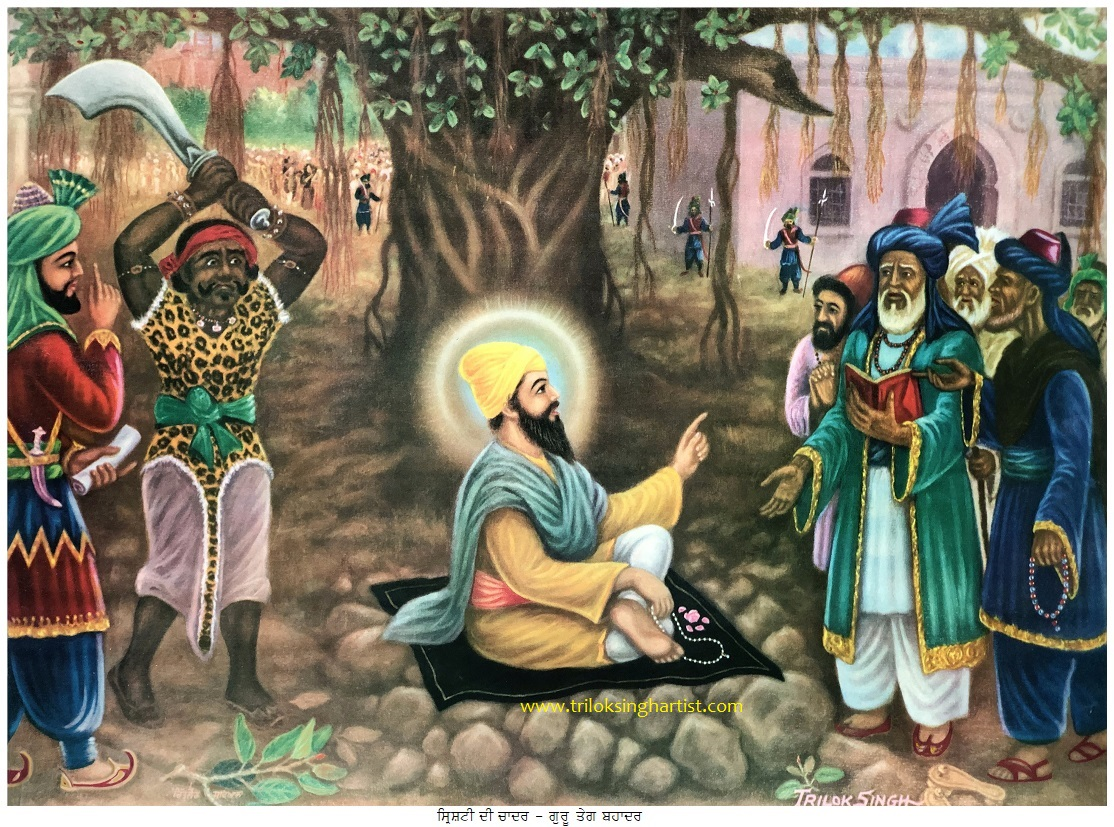
Painting of Trilok Singh of the martyrdom of Guru Tegh Bahadur

The later martyrdom of Guru Tegh Bahadur, who refused to convert to Islam in an effort to protect Hindu religious practice, is credited with making respect for freedom of conscience a key part of Sikh identity. The emperor tried to convert Guru Teg Bahadur to Islam hoping that it would be easier to convert his followers if he relented. The guru was executed because he refused. Experts stated that these events galvanized the concept of Sikh martyrdom in the sense that Guru Arjan's death brought the Sikh Panth together while Guru Teg Bahadur's execution finally gave Sikh martyrdom its identity. Guru Teg Bahadur's death provided the impetus for his son, the tenth Guru Gobind Singh, to impose an outward form of Sikh identity as well as pride in his father's martyrdom. To avoid fear and demoralization, he instituted a new Sikh order called Khalsa, founded on discipline and loyalty, and martyrdom became one of its foundations. Succeeding Gurus built on this new orientation, establishing a strong, self-governing warrior group.

The Sikhs constructed shrines dedicated to their martyrs, known as shaheed ganj. Furthermore, invocations to the martyrs are known as shaheedi pehre. At least three sites at the Golden Temple commemorate teġ vāhī, one dedicated to Baba Deep Singh (martyred in 1757), another to Baba Gurbaksh Singh (martyred in 1767), and the last dedicated to those killed during the actions of 1984 during Operation Blue Star.

== Prominent Sikh martyrs ==
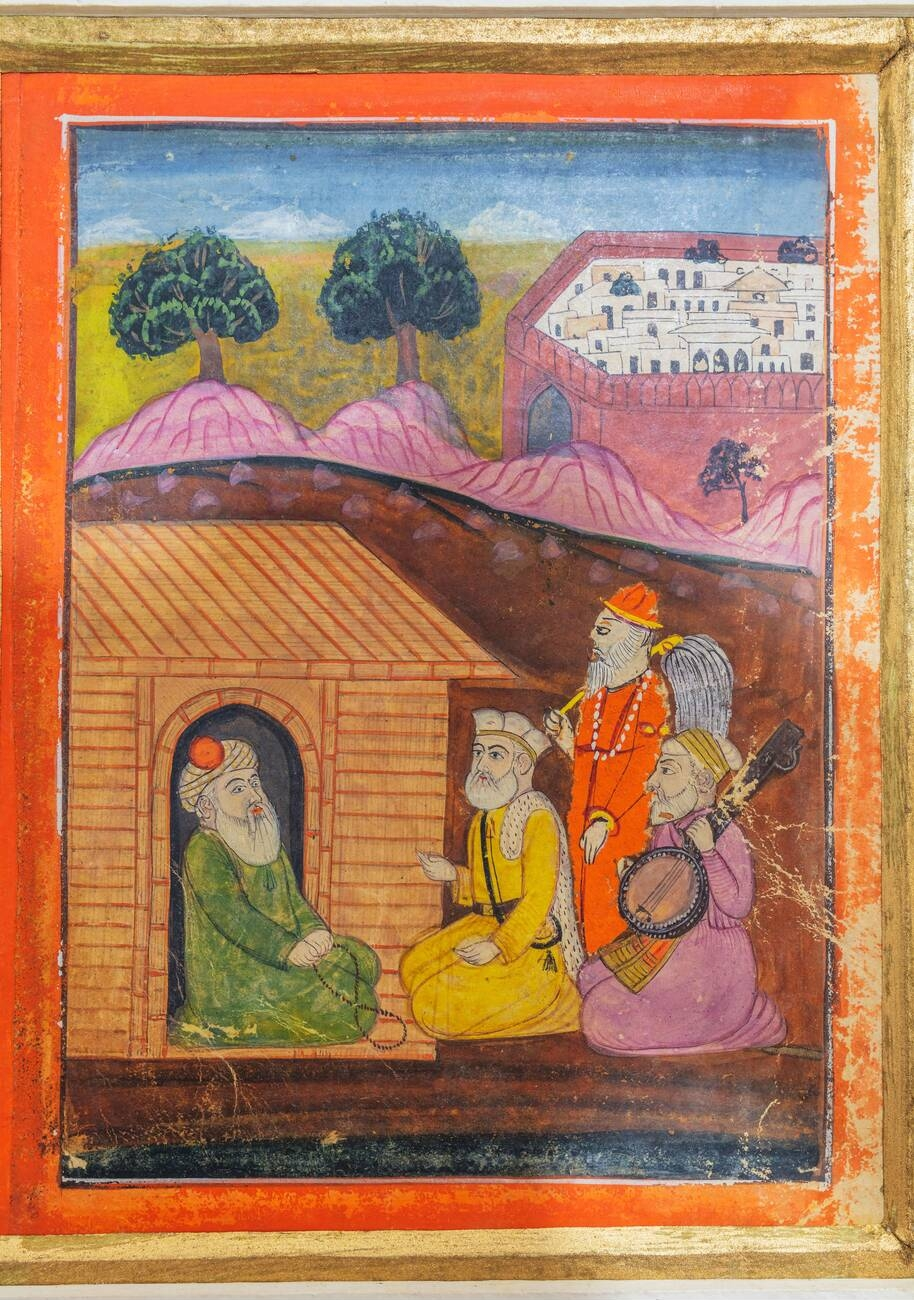
Guru Nanak (wearing yellow) conversing with Qazi Ruknuddin (wearing green), painting from an 1830's Janamsakhi (life stories). Qazi Ruknuddin is believed to be the first Sikh martyr.

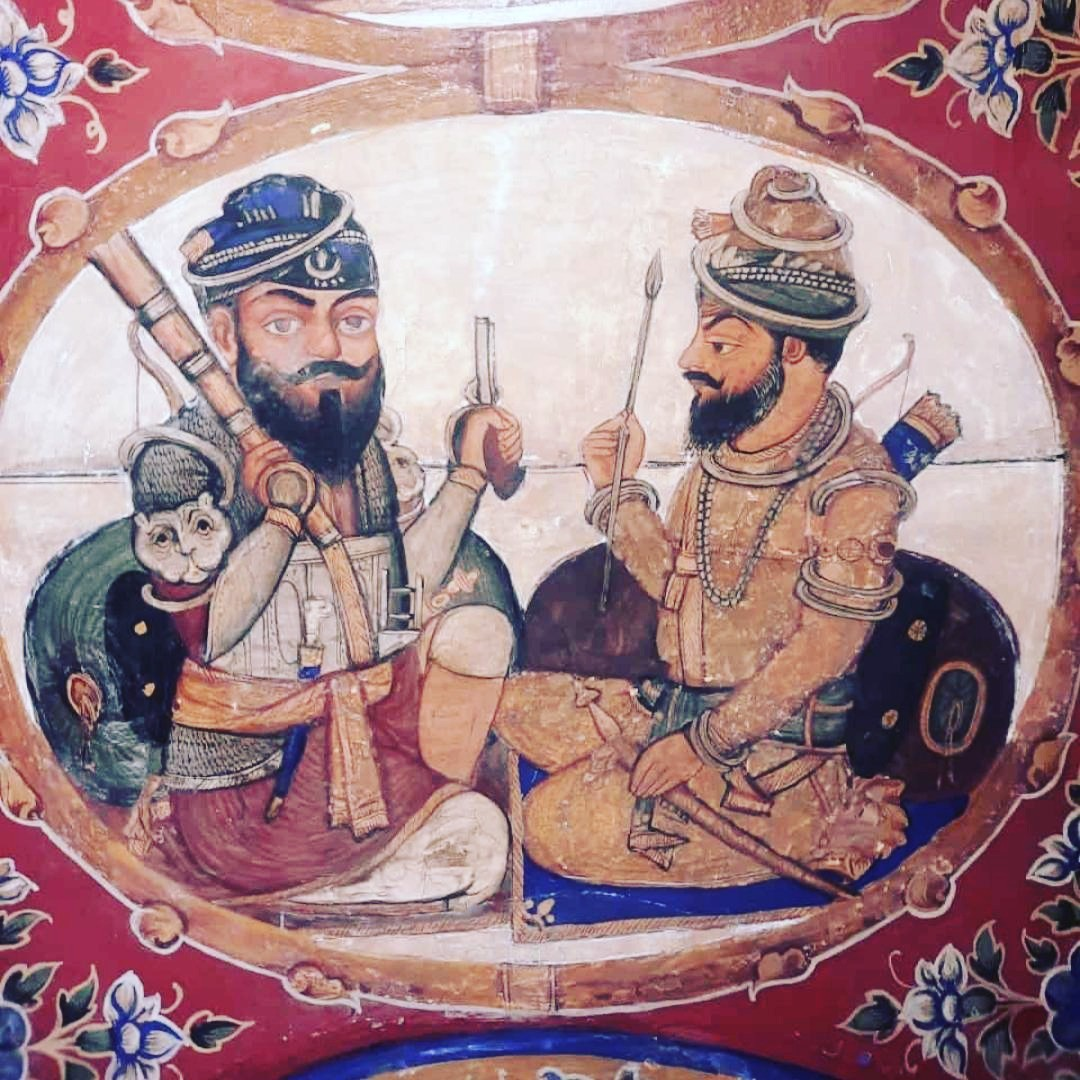
Fresco of Shaheed Singhs from Gurdwara Baba Atal

=== Period of Sikh gurus ===
- Guru Arjan Dev, the 5th guru of Sikhism.
- Guru Teg Bahadur, the 9th guru of Sikhism.
- Bhai Dayala is one of the Sikhs who was martyred at Chandni Chowk at Delhi in November 1675 on account of his refusal to accept Islam.
- Bhai Mati Das is one of the greatest martyrs in Sikh history, martyred at Chandni Chowk at Delhi in November 1675 to save Kashmiri Hindus.
- Bhai Sati Das is one of the greatest martyrs in Sikh history, martyred along with Guru Teg Bahadur at Chandni Chowk at Delhi in November 1675 to save Kashmiri Hindus.
- Daya Singh, one of Panj Pyare.
- Dharam Singh, one of Panj Pyare.
- Himmat Singh, one of Panj Pyare.
- Mohkam Singh, one of Panj Pyare.
- Sahib Singh, one of Panj Pyare.
- Sahibzada Ajit Singh, the eldest of Guru Gobind Singh's four sons.
- Sahibzada Jujhar Singh, the second son of Guru Gobind Singh.
- Sahibzada Zorawar Singh was the third of Guru Gobind Singh's four sons.
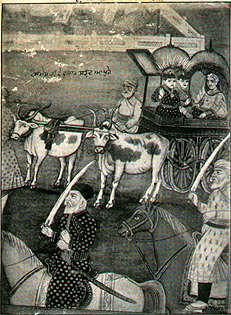
  Painting of Mata Gujri, Sahibzada Zorawar Singh, and Sahibzada Fateh Singh, after the Anandpur battle, reach Sirhind, where the princes, Zorawar Singh and Fateh Singh, were executed by immurement, circa 19th century
- Sahibzada Fateh Singh was the youngest of Guru Gobind Singh's four sons.
- Bibi Dalair Kaur
- Baba Moti Ram Mehra
- Chali Mukte

=== 18th century (post-1708) ===
- Banda Singh Bahadur was a Sikh military commander appointed by Guru Gobind Singh.
- Bhai Tara Singh Wan was martyred in the Battle of Wan.
- Bhai Mani Singh
- Bhai Mahi Singh
- Bhai Taru Singh
- Baba Deep Singh was avenging the desecration of the Golden Temple by the Afghan army. In 1757, he led an army to defend the Golden Temple.
- Baba Gurbaksh Singh
- Bhai Garja Singh
- Bhai Bota Singh
- Bhai Subeg Singh

=== 19th century ===
- Akali Phoola Singh
- Hari Singh Nalwa

=== 20th century ===
- Jarnail Singh Bhindranwale was declared a martyr by the Akal Takht.
- Major General Shabeg Singh was declared a martyr by the Akal Takht.
- Harjinder Singh Jinda was declared a national martyr by the Akal Takht.
- Sukhdev Singh Sukha was declared a national martyr by the Akal Takht.
- Satwant Singh assassin of Prime Minister Indira Gandhi was declared a martyr by the Akal Takht.
- Beant Singh assassin of Prime Minister Indira Gandhi was declared a martyr by the Akal Takht.
- Kehar Singh, was declared martyr by the Akal Takht.
- Jaswant Singh Khalra prominent Sikh Human Rights Activist famous for his research concerning more than 25,000 killings in the Punjab.

== See also ==
- General
  - Kharku
  - Joti Jot
  - Shaheed Shrine
  - Dal Khalsa
- Sikh warriors
  - Banda Bahadur
  - Baba Deep Singh
  - Nawab Kapur Singh
  - Moti Ram Mehra
- Decline of the Mughal Empire
  - Battle of Fatehpur Sikri
  - Sikh attacks on Delhi
  - Maratha capture of Mughals
  - Maratha conquest of North-west India
