= Gurdwara Fatehgarh Sahib =

Sikh temple in Punjab, India

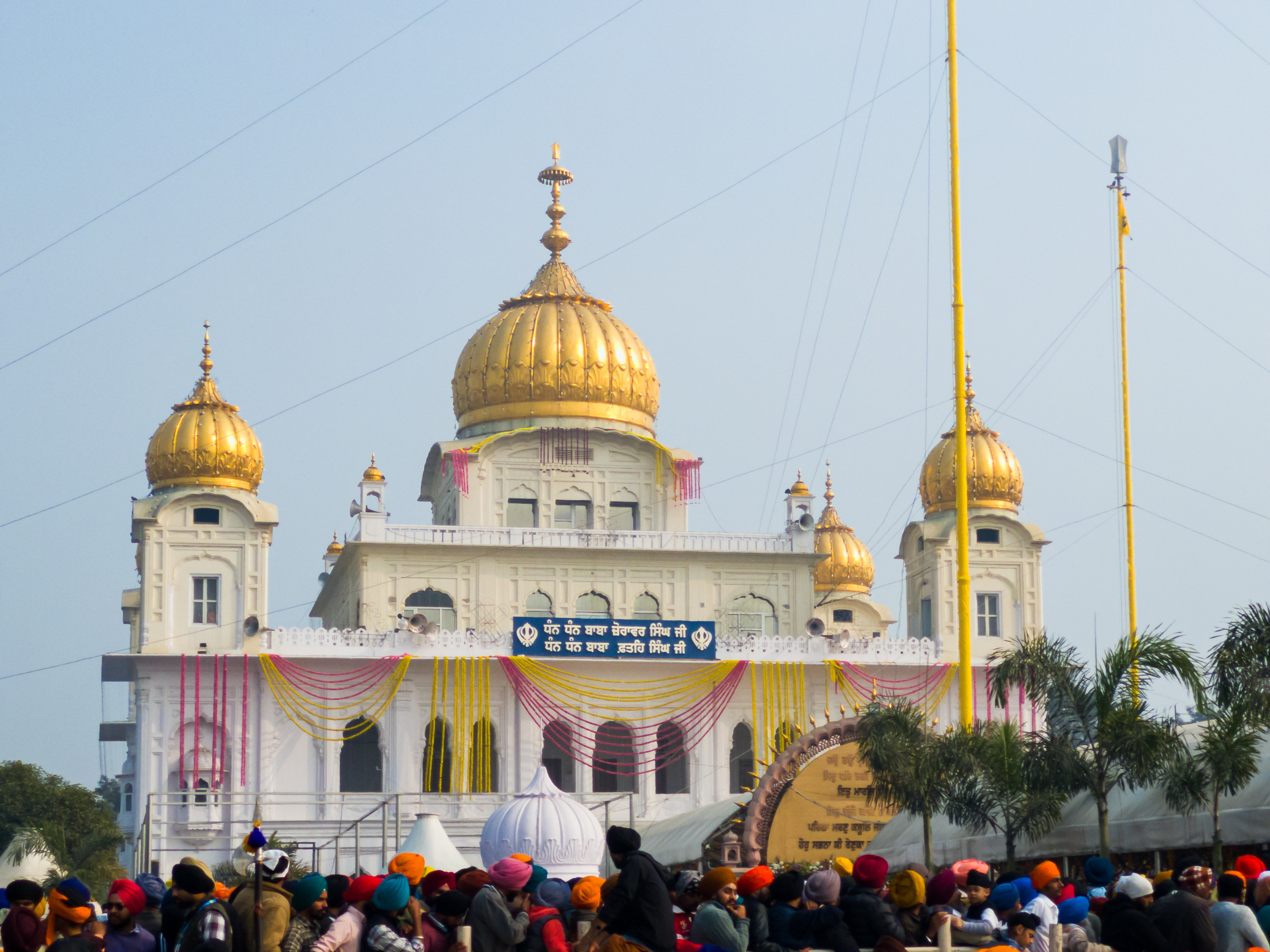
- Gurdwara Fatehgarh Sahib

- Location within Punjab Location within India Location within Asia

Religion
- Affiliation: Sikhism

Location
- Location: Fatehgarh Sahib
- State: Punjab
- Country: India
- Coordinates: 30.6260585°N 76.3965685°E

Architecture
- Type: Gurdwara
- Style: Sikh architecture

Gurdwara Fatehgarh Sahib is a Sikh gurdwara or place of worship in the city of Fatehgarh Sahib in the Indian state of Punjab. The gurdwara marks the 1710 conquest of the city by the Sikhs under the leadership of Banda Singh Bahadur. Sikhs captured the area and razed the fort built by Ferozshah Tughlaq to the ground.

== History ==
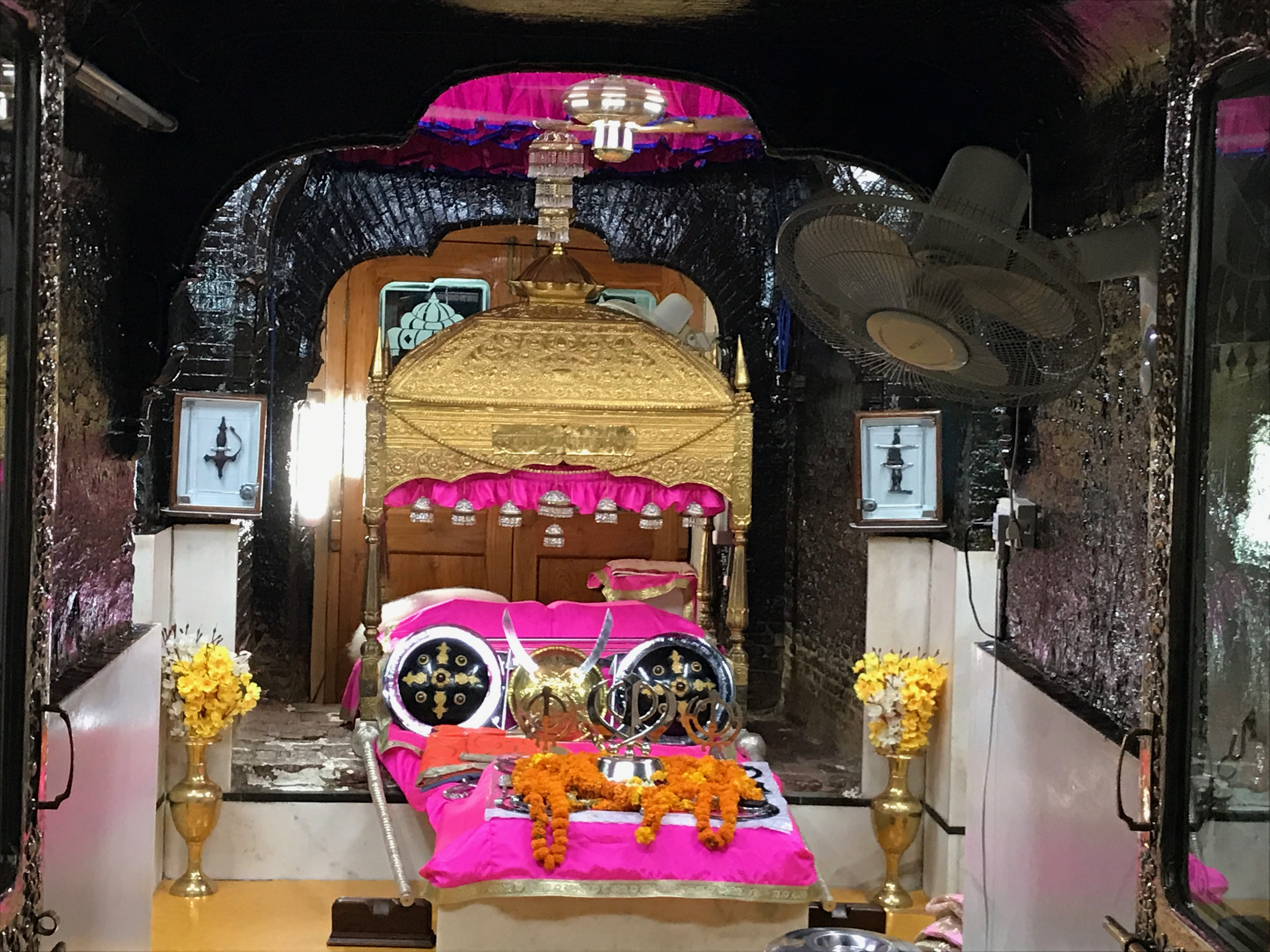
Bhora Sahib, the sanctum remembering the spot where two sons of Guru Gobind Singh were buried alive. The wall is visible to the side of the golden dome.

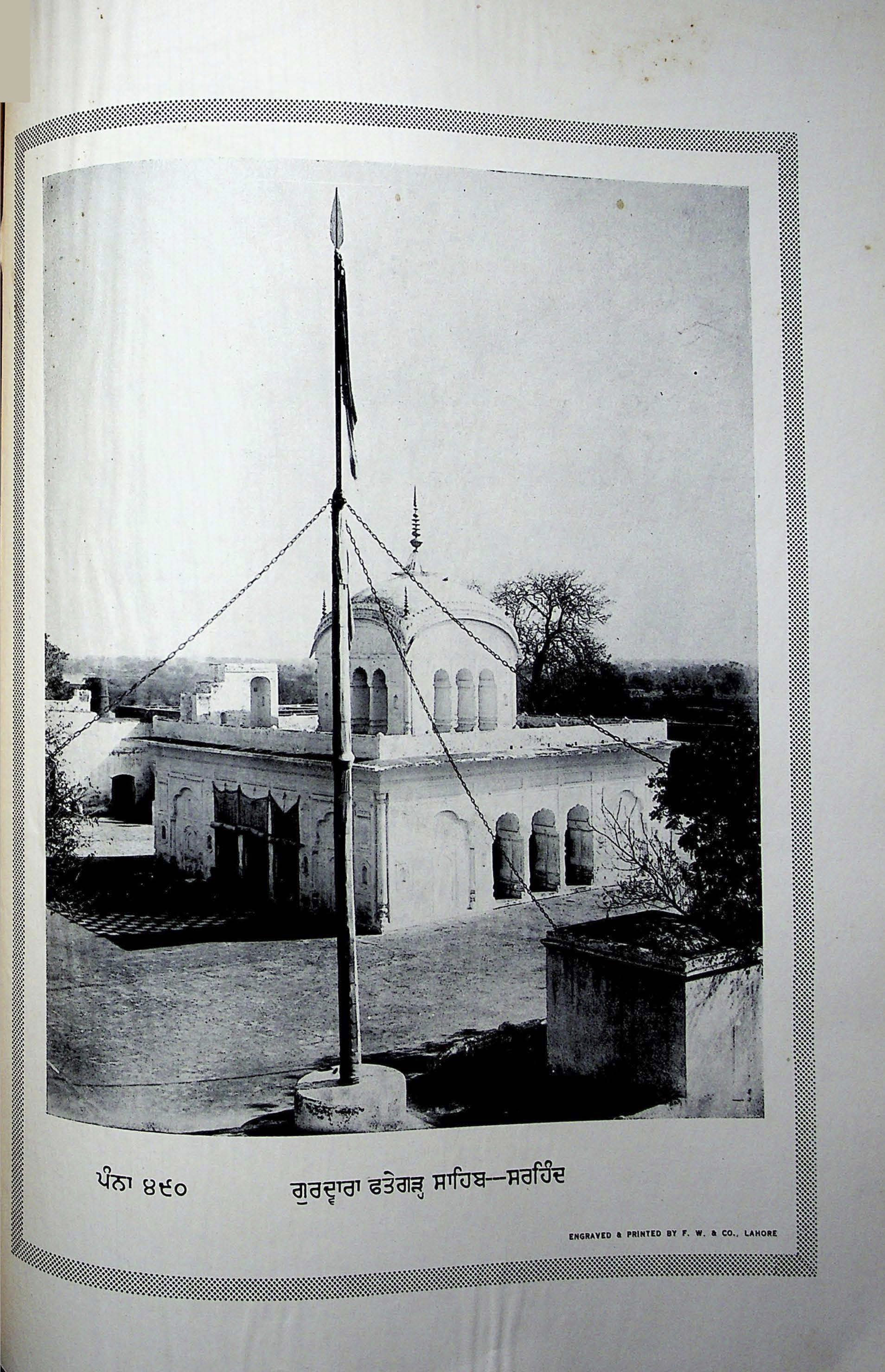
Original Gurdwara Sri Fatehgarh Sahib

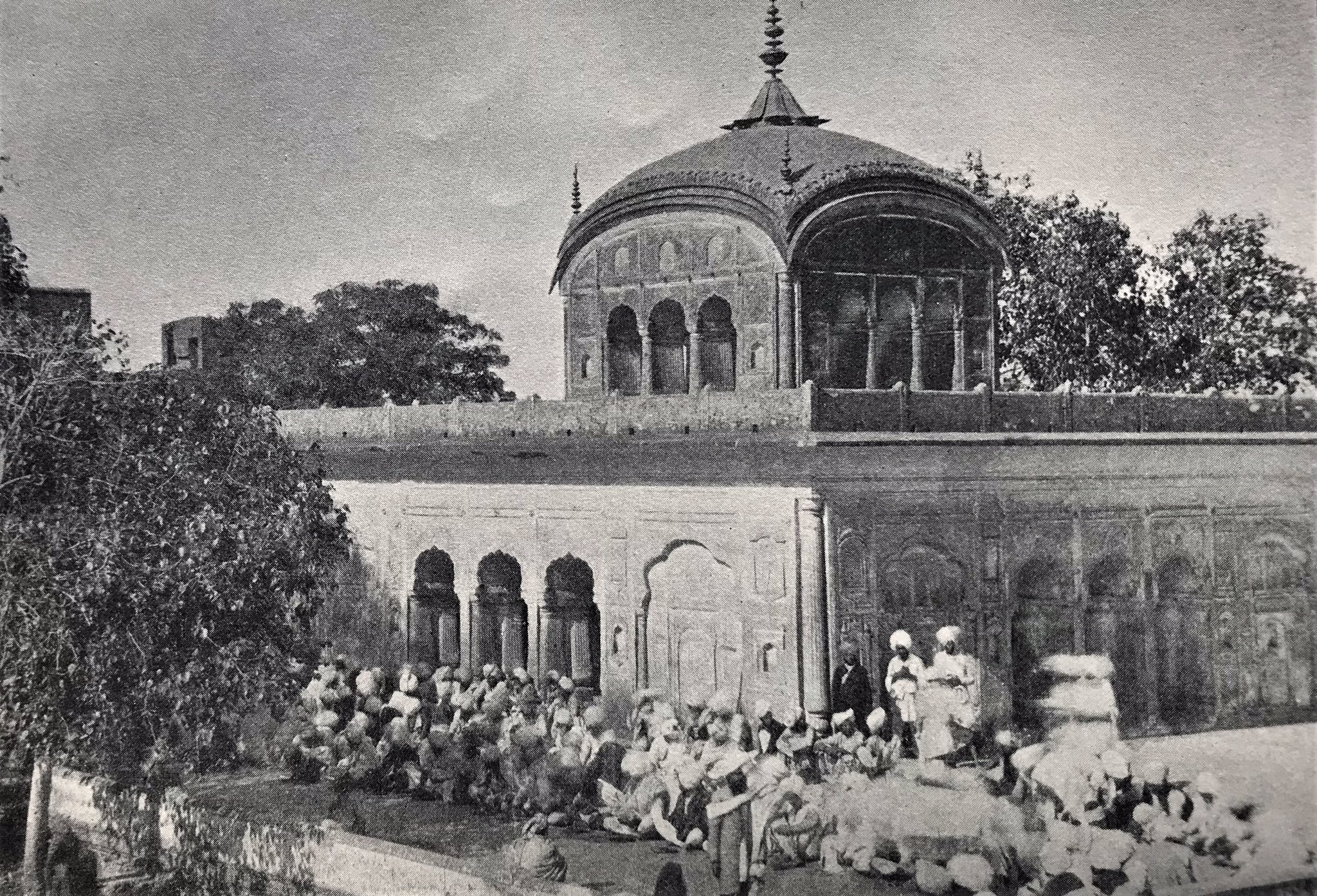
Historical photograph of Fatehgarh Sahib in the early 1900's.

To commemorate the martyrdom of younger sons of Guru Gobind Singh, who were bricked-up alive in 1705 by Wazir Khan, the governor or fauzdar of Sirhind, a magnificent gurdwara was constructed.

It is the location where two youngest sons of Guru Gobind Singh Ji – 7 year old Fateh Singh and 9 year old Zorawar Singh – were betrayed by their cook and servant Gangu to the Mughal army, seized, asked to convert to Islam and when they refused they were buried alive under the orders of Wazir Khan. Their martyrdom on 9 December 1705 has been remembered by the Sikhs by naming the site as Fatehgarh after the youngest boy killed, and by building a large Gurdwara in 1843. The town is also the location where the Sikhs took revenge by capturing it from Wazir Khan in 1710 and killing him. However, the Sikh militia was defeated again few years later and the town remained in the control of Muslim rulers, including later an appointee of Ahmed Shah Durrani till 1764, when Khalsa recaptured it by defeating and killing the appointee Zain Khan. The main gurdwara structure of Gurdwara Fatehgarh Sahib was originally built in 1844 during the reign of Maharaja Karam Singh of Patiala in the Phulkian style of Sikh architecture, however it has since been rebuilt by Kar Seva renovators in another style.

Other major Sikh Gurdwaras in the complex:

- Bhora Sahib: the underground location within Fatehgarh Sahib Gurdwara where the two sons were buried alive. This monument was built by Karam Singh of Patiala in early 19th-century.
- Gurdwara Jyoti Sarup lies about 1.5 kilometres (0.93 mi) southeast from Fatehgarh Sahib on the Sirhind-Chandigarh road. At this place, Mata Gujri – the mother of Guru Gobind Singh, and her two youngest grandchildren, Fateh Singh and Zorawar Singh were cremated.
- Gurdwara Bimangarh is close to the Fatehgarh Sahib Gurdwara. It is a location where the dead bodies of the two children and their grandmother was kept for the night before the cremation.
- Banda Singh Bahadur platform is believed in the Sikh tradition as the place where 6,000 Sikhs died fighting the Muslim army in the Battle of Chapparchiri.

== Main Gurudwara Complex ==
A number of gurdwaras are also located in the main complex of Gurudwara Fatehgarh Sahib.

=== Gurudwara Bhora Sahib ===
The historical wall where the younger sons of Guru Gobind Singh were bricked-up alive has been preserved in this gurdwara. The sanctuary containing the historic wall known as Gurudwara Bhora Sahib.

=== Gurudwara Burj Mata Gujri ===
At this site Baba Zorawar Singh ji and Baba Fateh Singh ji, the two younger sons of tenth guru of sikhs Guru Gobind Singh and his mother were kept in confinement by Wazir Khan. The fort was known as Thanda Burj, and was considered a cool place during the summer. However, it was a punishment for Guru's sons and his mother to be kept here in extreme winter. It was at this place that Mata Gujri collapsed on hearing the news of the martyrdom of her grandsons. Later on, Gurdwara Mata Gujri was constructed here.

=== Gurudwara Shahid Ganj ===
The Gurudwara Shahid Ganj was built to commemorate the memory of the brave Sikhs who were killed while fighting with Mughal forces under the banner of Banda Singh Bahadur. They were cremated here.

=== Diwan Todar Mal Hall ===
A very big hall in memory of Seth Todar Mal who purchased land by paying gold coins for the cremation of the said martyrs lies behind the main gurdwara.

=== Sarovar ===
A large sacred pool or sarovar is also located in the Complex.

== Shaheedi Jor Mela ==
A historic Shaheedi Jor Mela is held here in the month of December every year when large number of pilgrims visit.

== Gallery ==
Todar Mal Hall

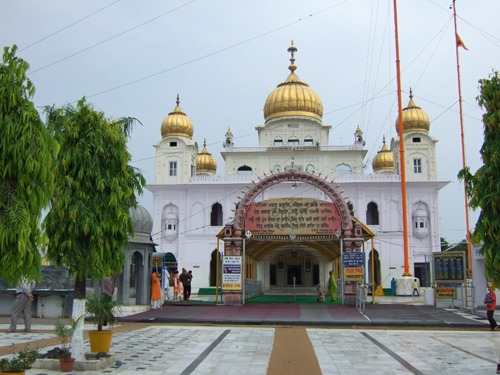
Gurdwara Fatehgarh main building

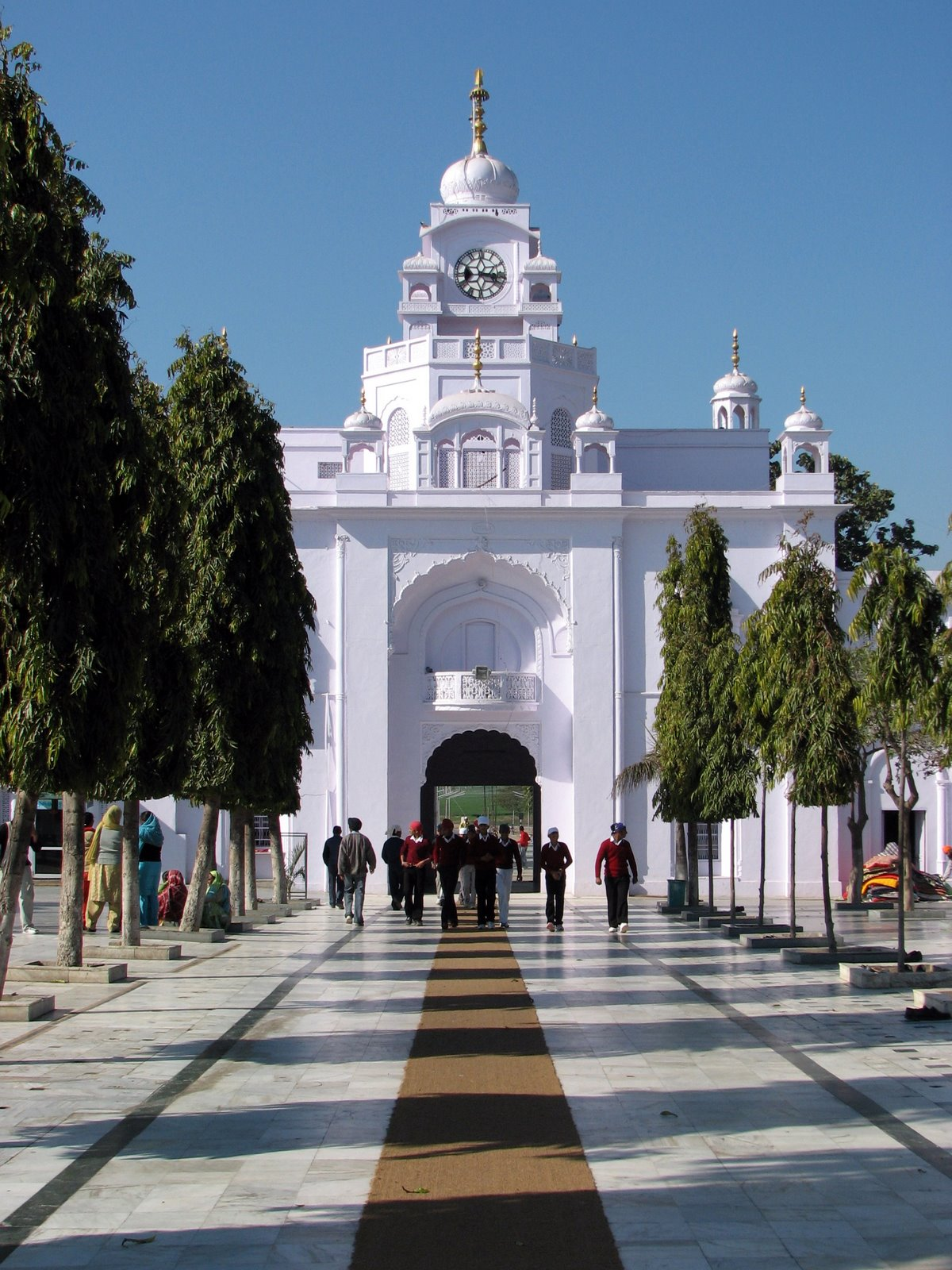
Gurdwara Fatehgarh main entrance

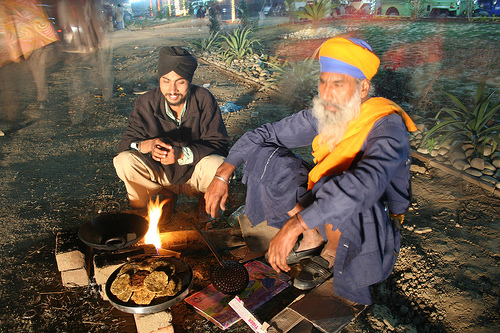
Nihang at Shaheedi Jor Mela

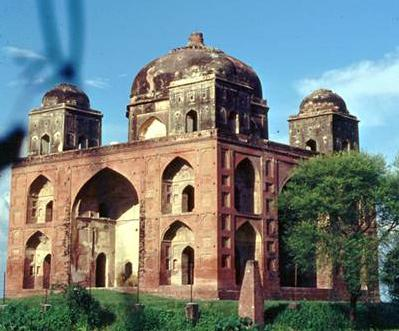
Tomb of Shagird, Sirhind

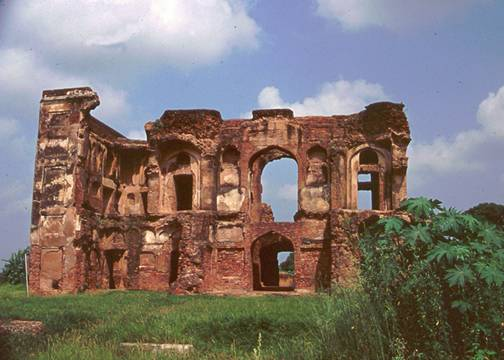
Aam Khas Bagh

Gurudwara Thanda Burj Mata Gujri

Gurudwara Bhora Sahib at Fatehgarh Sahib

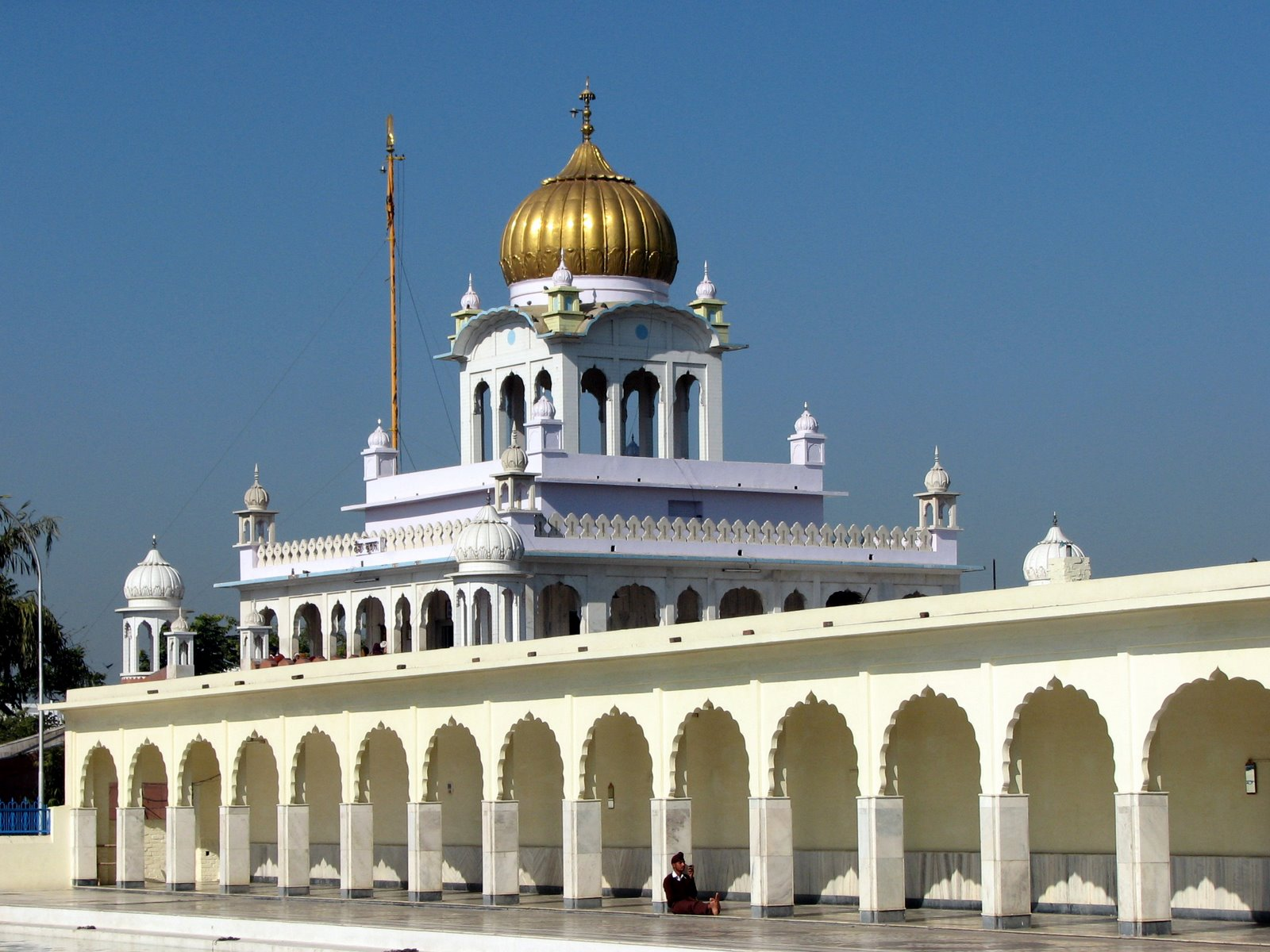
Sarovar (sacred pool) at Fatehgarh Sahib Gurdwara, Punjab, India.

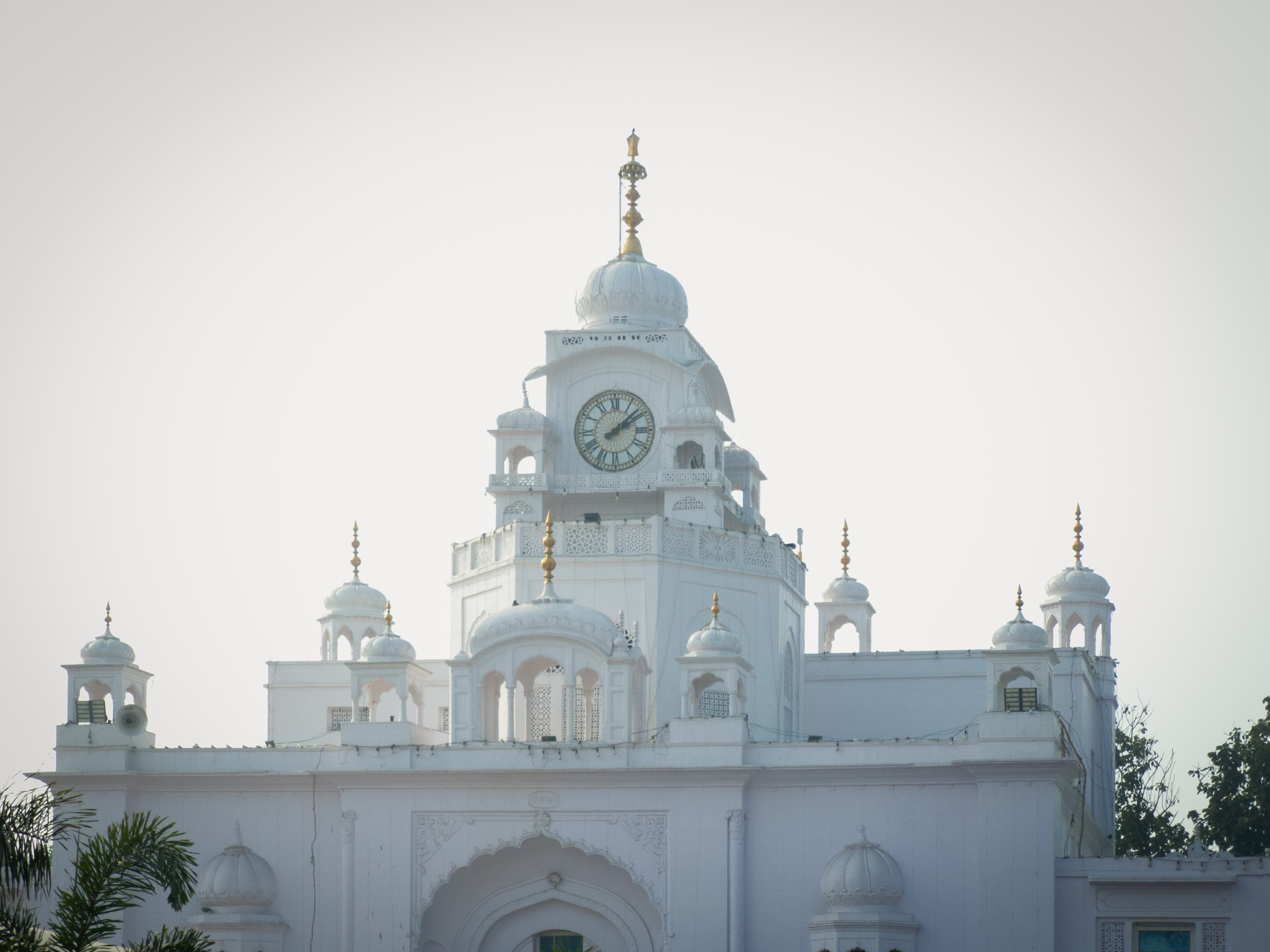
Main entrance of Gurdwara Fatehgarh Sahib

== See also ==
- History of Sirhind
- Rauza Sharif
