= Saka Sirhind =

Martyrdom of Sikh Sahibzade

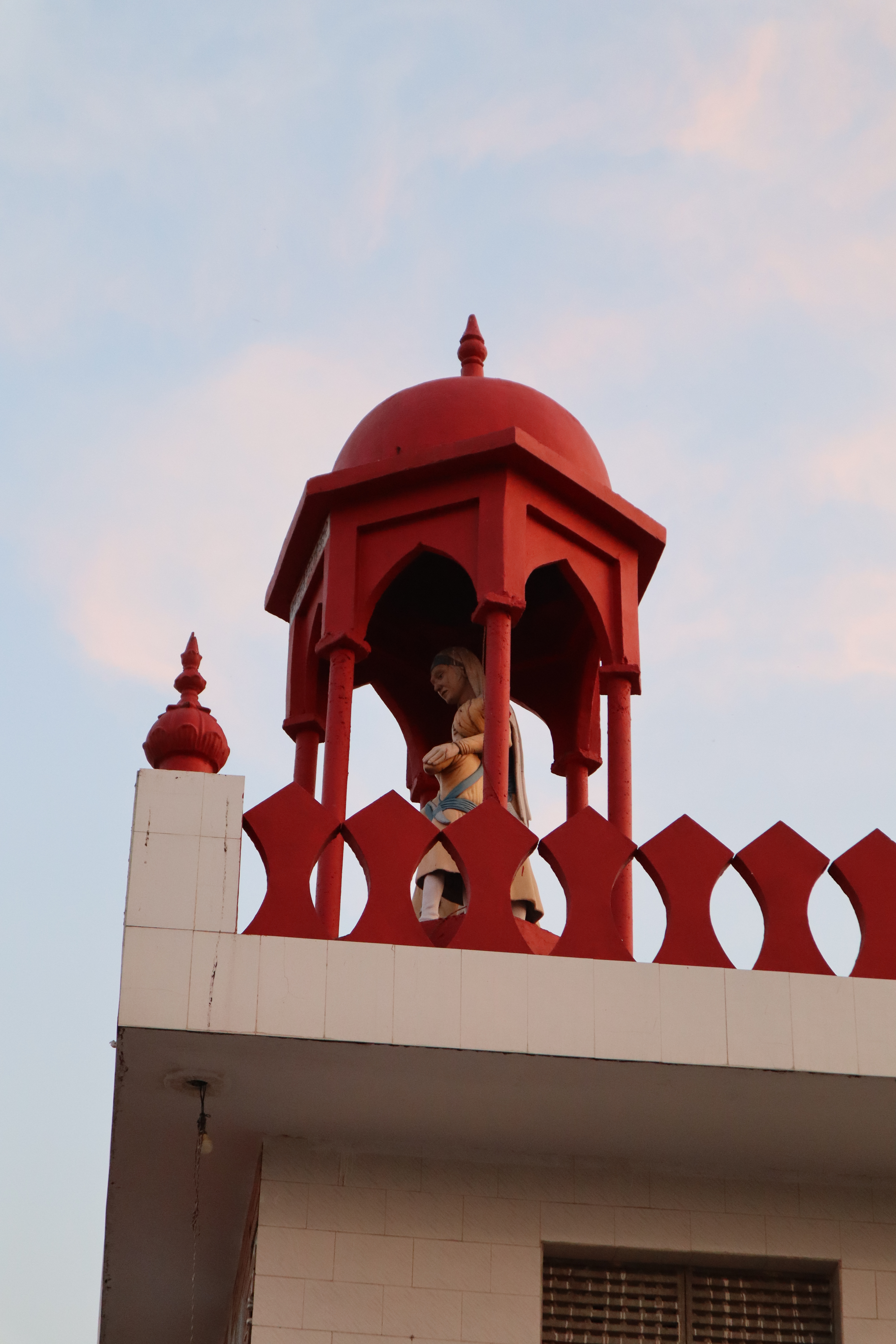
Diorama sculptural monument of Mata Gujri and the Chhote Sahibzade in the Thanda Burj at Gurdwara Shaheed Baba Tega Singh Ji, Chand Purana, Bagha Purana tehsil, Moga district, Punjab, India, April 2023

The Saka Sirhind (Punjabi: ਸਾਕਾ ਸਰਹਿੰਦ) or the Nikke Sahibzada Saka (Punjabi: ਨਿੱਕੇ ਸਾਹਿਬਜ਼ਾਦੇ ਸਾਕਾ) refers to the martyrdom (Shaheedi) of the two sons of Guru Gobind Singh, named Zorawar Singh and Fateh Singh. The two Sikh children are remembered as the Nikke Sahibzade (Punjabi: ਨਿੱਕੇ ਸਾਹਿਬਜ਼ਾਦੇ (Gurmukhi)). They are believed to have attained martyrdom on 26 December 1704 at the ages of 5(or 6) and 9 respectively. In remembrance of this occasion, the Shaheedi Jor Mela is organised annually at Fatehgarh Sahib Punjab, India, to commemorate the supreme sacrifice at the place of their martyrdom on the 24 to 26 December.

== The Siege of Anandpur Sahib and the betrayal of 1704 ==
In 1704, Guru Gobind Singh and his Sikhs were under immense pressure as the Mughals and hill chiefs laid siege to Anandpur Sahib, cutting off all supplies and forcing the Sikhs to survive on leaves and tree bark. Many, including the Guru’s mother, urged him to accept Wazir Khan’s offer of safe passage, backed by an oath on the Quran and promises from the hill chiefs. Knowing the enemy’s deceit, the Guru tested their sincerity by sending out bullock carts filled with worthless items, which were immediately looted. Despite this betrayal, continued pressure from his followers and mother left him with no choice but to agree to leave. On the night of December 20–21, 1704, under cold winds and rain, Guru Gobind Singh Ji's family and a group of Sikhs left first, led by Udai Singh, while Guru Gobind Sahib Ji planned to follow. However, as they moved out, the Mughals and hill forces broke their oath and attacked, leading to the chaotic and tragic Battle of Sarsa, where the Sikhs were scattered, and many lost their lives.

=== Crossing the Sarsa River and the separation of Guru Gobind Singh’s family ===
The usually dry Sarsa River had transformed into a raging torrent due to heavy rainfall in the hills, making it nearly impossible to cross. A group of Sikhs had gathered at the riverbank, waiting for Guru Gobind Singh to arrive. Meanwhile, the Guru, accompanied by his two elder sons and approximately 400 Sikhs, set out toward the river. However, before they could reach the crossing, a large Mughal force under Wazir Khan launched a fierce attack on them. At the same time, another Mughal unit assaulted the Sikhs waiting by the riverbank.

In the midst of torrential rain, biting cold, and the chaos of battle, confusion spread among the Sikhs. Many lost their lives, including Udai Singh and his warriors. Some brave Sikhs attempted to cross the treacherous river on horseback, carrying the Guru’s family with them. While they managed to reach the other side, they lost all their belongings, including valuable manuscripts, to the floodwaters.

Once across the river, the Guru’s family became separated. His mother, Mata Gujri, along with his younger sons, Baba Zorawar Singh and Baba Fateh Singh, could not travel far and were given shelter by Gangu, a former servant of the Guru’s household, who took them to his village, Saheri. Meanwhile, Mata Sundari and Mata Sahib Kaur, disguising themselves as village women, made their way toward Ambala for safety.

Guru Gobind Singh and his warriors also suffered heavy losses. Many Sikhs were either killed in battle or drowned while attempting to cross the river. By the time the Guru reached the other side, only 43 Sikhs remained with him, including his elder sons, Baba Ajit Singh and Baba Jujhar Singh, the Five Beloved Ones (Panj Pyare), and other warriors. As they resumed their journey, troubling news reached them—a Mughal force of nearly a thousand soldiers was advancing from Sirhind, while another enemy unit was making its way across the Sarsa River in pursuit.

== Martyrdom of Sahibzada Ajit Singh and Sahibzada Jujhar Singh ==
After leaving Anandpur Sahib, Guru Gobind Singh and his Sikhs faced a desperate situation. They were surrounded by enemies—Mughal forces behind them and the hill chiefs who had betrayed them on their left. The Guru and his followers kept moving towards Chamkaur, but the Mughal army was fast approaching. Realizing the danger, the Guru halted near Chamkaur and sent two Sikhs into the village to find a safe place to stay. They found a small, two-story mud house with a large open courtyard. The house had two owners, and one of them offered his portion for shelter. Without delay, Guru Gobind Singh and his men quickly entered the house on the evening of December 21, 1704, just before the enemy could reach them. By the next morning, December 22, the Mughals had completely surrounded the house. Guru Gobind Singh divided his men into three groups—one was assigned to guard the main entrance, another took positions in the upper story to observe enemy movements, and the rest defended the surrounding walls to prevent the enemy from climbing over.

Before attacking, the Mughal commanders sent a messenger to persuade the Guru to surrender. They warned him that he was not fighting weak and disorganized hill chiefs anymore but the mighty Mughal Empire, ruled by Aurangzeb, who was known as "the king of kings" and "the protector of the world." They demanded that Guru Gobind Singh stop fighting, submit to Aurangzeb, and convert to Islam. When the messenger delivered this message, Baba Ajit Singh, could not tolerate the insult. He immediately drew his sword and warned the messenger that if he spoke another word, he would cut him into pieces. Enraged, the messenger returned to the Mughal camp with this defiant reply.

Soon after, the battle began. The Sikhs, dressed in their new uniforms prescribed by the Guru, stood firm despite being heavily outnumbered. The Mughals attacked with cannons and muskets, while the Sikhs responded with arrows and gunfire from behind the walls, windows, rooftops, and even through small gaps in the doors. The sound of gunfire and the clash of weapons filled the air as the Sikhs bravely defended themselves. The Mughal soldiers were struck down one after another, but the Sikhs also suffered heavy losses. Guru Gobind Singh later described the battle in a letter to Aurangzeb, saying that his small group of warriors had fought against thousands who had broken their oaths. He personally shot an arrow at Nahar Khan, a Mughal officer, forcing him to retreat. Many other Mughal leaders also fled from the battlefield, proving that their earlier boasts were empty.

As the battle raged on, Guru Gobind Singh watched his men fight to their last breath. Baba Ajit Singh, led a charge against the enemy, cutting down many soldiers before he was eventually overwhelmed and killed. His Younger brother, Baba Jujhar Singh, who was still in his early teens, also fought bravely, refusing to back down despite facing trained soldiers. One by one, the Sikhs fell, their bodies piling up in the courtyard and around the house. The battlefield was covered in blood, with severed heads and limbs scattered like broken toys. The sun set early on that short winter day, and by nightfall, only five Sikhs remained alive with Guru Gobind Singh.

As Guru Gobind Singh reflected on the day's sacrifices, the five surviving Sikhs made a bold decision. They declared themselves the Guru and ordered him to escape for the survival of the Khalsa. Obeying their command, he left at midnight with three Sikhs, while Sant Singh, who resembled him, stayed behind wearing the Guru’s clothes. When the enemy attacked again, they killed Sant Singh, believing him to be the Guru. This sacrifice allowed Guru Gobind Singh to escape.

== Fatehnama ==
Fatehnama audio recording, recited by a native Iranian

After Battle of Chamkaur, Guru Gobind Singh sent later to the Mughal emperor Aurangzeb. In the Fatehnama, Guru Gobind Singh expresses his grievances about the betrayal of oaths, stating that despite sworn promises, his army and civilians were attacked. He calls it a conspiracy that ultimately failed. The Guru asserts that he is still alive and prepared for battle. Despite his losses in the Battle of Chamkaur, he remains in Chardi Kala (eternal optimism and high spirits). He declares that he is neither afraid nor shaken by Aurangzeb’s attempts to destroy him. Guru Gobind Singh challenges Aurangzeb to bring his army to the battlefield, promising to bring his own. He suggests that both armies maintain a distance of three kilometers and proposes a duel where he will face Aurangzeb and his two lieutenants simultaneously.

Now, I do not trust in your oath, and I have no other alternative except drawing the sword… If you talk to me again, then I shall put you on the sacred and straight path.

— Guru Gobind Singh, Fatehnama

== Martyrdom of Sahibzada Zorawar Singh and Sahibzada Fateh Singh ==
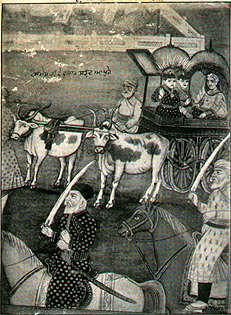
Painting of Mata Gujri, Sahibzada Zorawar Singh, and Sahibzada Fateh Singh, after the Anandpur battle, reach Sirhind, where the princes, Zorawar Singh and Fateh Singh, were executed by immurement, circa 19th century

After Battle of Sarsa, Gangu, along with Mata Gujri and the two young princes, Baba Zorawar Singh and Baba Fateh Singh, had crossed the flooded Sarsa River. They traveled to Rupar and then took the road to Morinda, where Gangu’s village, Saheri, was located. By this time, news of Guru Gobind Singh’s battle had spread everywhere. Fearing for his own safety, Gangu decided to betray them. He informed the government officials in Morinda about the people staying with him. As a result, Mata Gujri and the two children were arrested and sent to Sirhind, the headquarters of Wazir Khan. Gangu was rewarded with a simple "Shabash" (a word of praise), while the three captives were locked in a cold tower called Thanda Burj. Though this tower was used as a summer retreat for officials, it was extremely uncomfortable during the harsh winter, especially for the elderly Mata Gujri and the two young boys, who were just eight and five years old.

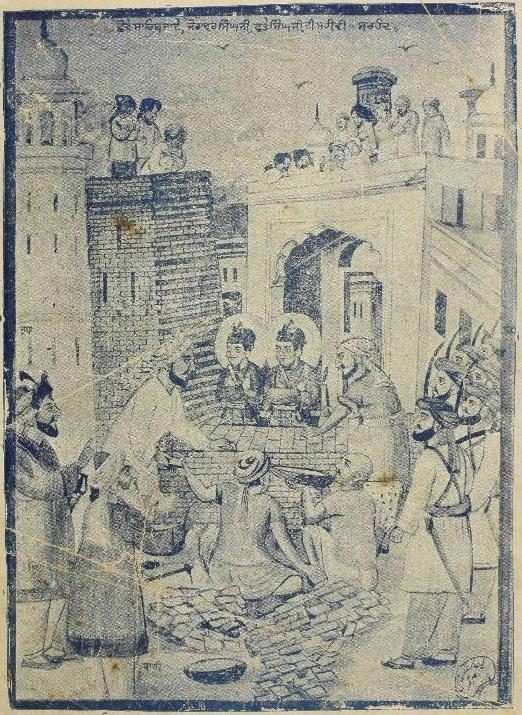
Painting of the execution of the Chhote Sahibzade, namely Zorawar Singh and Fateh Singh

Wazir Khan was furious that he had failed to capture the Guru Gobind Singh. In his frustration, he decided to target the young sons of the Guru. On December 24, 1704, both the Sahibzadas were brought before his court in a grand public gathering. Hundreds of armed soldiers stood around them to intimidate them. The Nawab’s men told the Sahibzadas that their father, Guru Gobind Singh, their older brothers, and all Sikhs had been killed. They were offered a safe and comfortable life if they agreed to convert to Islam. However, the young princes boldly refused the offer, showing no fear. They reminded the court that their grandfather, Guru Tegh Bahadur, had also refused to convert to Islam and was martyred for his faith. A courtier named Suchanand Khatri insulted them, saying that the children of a snake are always venomous.

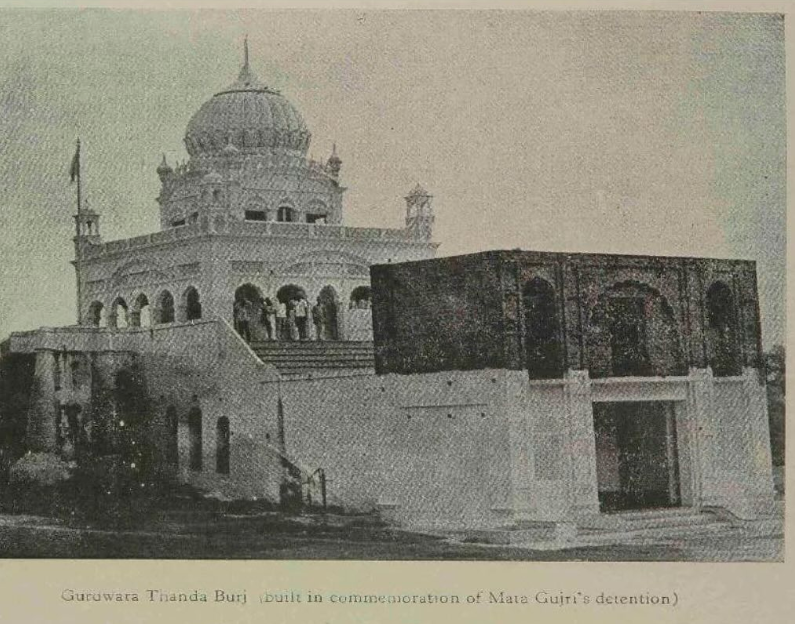
The original building of "Gurudwara Thanda Burj", where a Sikh Gurudwara was built over the original structure before it was completely destroyed and rebuilt in the 1900s

The next day, December 25, the Sahibzadas were once again brought to the court. The officials used various methods to pressure them into converting, but nothing could shake their determination. Even Nawab Sher Muhammad Khan of Malerkotla, who had fought against Guru Gobind Singh in battle and lost his own relatives, was deeply moved by the courage of the young princes. Though he was opposed to the Guru, he refused to take part in harming the children when Wazir Khan asked him to. Wazir Khan ordered their execution. sentencing them to be bricked up in a wall. Even as they were placed inside, the Sahibzadas remained steadfast in their faith. Enraged by their defiance, the soldiers pushed down the temporary wall made of mud and bricks. Finally, on December 27, 1704, the young princes were beheaded, and their bodies were disrespectfully discarded. Upon seeing their lifeless bodies, Mata Gujri could not bear the pain and died.

=== Cremation ===
A wealthy man named Todar Mal, who was a banker, took the responsibility of giving the children and Mata Gujri a proper cremation. He bought a piece of land for their funeral by laying gold coins on the ground as payment. The place where their bodies were discarded is now known as Gurdwara Fatehgarh Sahib. Another Gurdwara, called Gurdwara Jyoti Sarup, marks the site where their cremation took place Fatehgarh Sahib. Every year, two fairs are held at Gurdwara Fatehgarh Sahib—one in December to honor the children’s martyrdom and another in March during the festival of Hola Mohalla. Near Sirhind, there is also a memorial dedicated to Mata Gujri.

But for this Todar Mal had to lose the peace and prosperity for his own family. Bankrupt and a victim of Nawab Wazir Khan’s wrath the family fled their beautiful home and eventually faded into oblivion.

Nawab Wazir Khan was informed that his employee had served those prisoners with milk and water. The Nawab ordered the arrest of Baba Moti Ram, his mother, wife, and son. Baba Moti Ram and his family were sentenced to death by crushing in a Kohlu (oil press).

== Anup Kaur’s capture and tragic end ==
Anup Kaur, a girl assumed to be Mata Jito's younger sister, was captured by Sher Muhammad Khan, Nawab of Malerkotla, who intended to add her to his harem. She was taken to Malerkotla where she took her own life.

== Legacy ==
The legacy of Guru Gobind Singh and his sons, the Chaar Sahibzaade, holds an important place in Sikh history and culture. The city of Ajitgarh, formerly known as Mohali, was renamed in honor of Sahibzada Ajit Singh, and the surrounding district is now called Sahibzada Ajit Singh Nagar District. Sikh historian Ratan Singh Bhangu has compared Jujhar Singh’s martyrdom at Chamkaur to Abhimanyu’s sacrifice in the Mahabharata, noting that both fought in defense of their fathers. Additionally, one view on the origins of the Nihang Sikh tradition links it to Sahibzada Fateh Singh, whose blue attire, high turbans, and weaponry later became characteristic of the Akali Nihangs. A well-known account relates that Baba Fateh Singh appeared before Guru Gobind Singh dressed as a warrior, demonstrating a fearless demeanor that left an impression on even experienced soldiers; the Guru is reported to have predicted the emergence of a warrior sect in his likeness, which eventually became known as the Nihangs.

== See also ==
- Shaheedi Jor Mela
- First Battle of Chamkaur (1702).
- Second Battle of Chamkaur (1704)
- Moti Ram Mehra
