= Talwandi Jattan =

- Village
- Location in Punjab, India Talwandi Jattan (India)
- Coordinates: 31.1866397°N 75.8852652°E
- Country: India
- State: Punjab
- District: Shaheed Bhagat Singh Nagar

Government
  - Type: Panchayat raj
  - Body: Gram panchayat
- Elevation: 251 m (823 ft)

Population (2011)
  - Total: 818
- Sex ratio 418/400 ♂/♀

Languages
  - Official: Punjabi
- Time zone: UTC+5:30 (IST)
- PIN: 144504
- Telephone code: 01884
- ISO 3166 code: IN-PB
- Post office: Behram
- Website: nawanshahr.nic.in

Talwandi Jattan is a village in Shaheed Bhagat Singh Nagar district of Punjab State, India. It is located 2.2 kilometres (1.4 mi) away from postal head office Behram, 11.9 kilometres (7.4 mi) from Banga, 23.5 kilometres (14.6 mi) from district headquarter Shaheed Bhagat Singh Nagar and 115 kilometres (71 mi) from state capital Chandigarh. The village is administrated by Sarpanch an elected representative of the village.

== Demography ==
As of 2011, Talwandi Jattan has a total number of 188 houses and population of 818 of which 418 include are males while 400 are females according to the report published by Census India in 2011. The literacy rate of Talwandi Jattan is 87.43%, higher than the state average of 75.84%. The population of children under the age of 6 years is 78 which is 9.54% of total population of Talwandi Jattan, and child sex ratio is approximately 814 as compared to Punjab state average of 846.

Most of the people are from Schedule Caste which constitutes 53.03% of total population in Talwandi Jattan. The town does not have any Schedule Tribe population so far.

As per the report published by Census India in 2011, 286 people were engaged in work activities out of the total population of Talwandi Jattan which includes 220 males and 86 females. According to census survey report 2011, 61.54% workers describe their work as main work and 38.46% workers are involved in Marginal activity providing livelihood for less than 6 months.

== Education ==
The village has a Punjabi medium, co-ed primary school founded in 1932. The schools provide mid-day meal which prepared in school premises as per Indian Midday Meal Scheme. The school provide free education to children between the ages of 6 and 14 as per Right of Children to Free and Compulsory Education Act. Sikh National College Banga and Amardeep Singh Shergill Memorial college Mukandpur are the nearest colleges.

== Landmarks and history ==
In 1767 a battle was fought by Lodria Singh, Godria Singh and Roop Kaur against Shamas Khan who abducted a girl from Behram. The Sikh soldiers who got martyrdom in the battle were cremated here. A shrine Gurudwara Shahidganj was built at the same place where the soldiers who died in the battle, were cremated (not to be confused with Gurudwara Shahid Ganj in Fatehgarh Sahib). A religious fair held at the Gurdwara on birthdays of Sikh gurus and other occasions, which attended by people of all religions.

== Transport ==
Behram train station is the nearest train station however, Nawanshahr railway station is 25 kilometres (16 mi) away from the village. Sahnewal Airport is the nearest domestic airport which located 69.6 kilometres (43.2 mi) away in Ludhiana and the nearest international airport is located in Chandigarh also Sri Guru Ram Dass Jee International Airport is the second nearest airport which is 131 kilometres (81 mi) away in Amritsar.

== See also ==
- List of villages in India
