= Todarmal (disambiguation) =

Todar Mal or Todarmal (1523–1589), was the finance minister of Mughal emperor Akbar.

Todarmal may also refer to:

- Pandit Todarmal (1719–1766), Indian Jain scholar and writer
- Diwan Todar Mal, a wealthy Jain merchant in Sikh history, assisted with the cremation of the younger Sahibzade and Mata Gujari in Sirhind
