= Moti Ram Mehra =

Hindu disciple

Baba Moti Ram Mehra

Personal life
- Died: 1704 Sirhind Sarkar, Delhi Subah, Mughal Empire
- Cause of death: Execution by crushing

Religious life
- Religion: Sikhism / Hinduism

Baba Moti Ram Mehra (fl. late 17th – early 18th century) was a disciple of Guru Gobind Singh who managed to enter the Thanda Burj and serve milk to Mata Gujri, Baba Zorawar Singh and Baba Fateh Singh where they were imprisoned by the Mughal Governor of Sirhind, Wazir Khan.

== Biography ==
=== Early life ===
Baba Moti Ram was born to Bholi and Hariya Ram. His uncle was Bhai Himmat Singh, a member of 1st Panj Pyare. He used to live in live in a mud house with his wife, mother and a son. He used to serve pilgrims (Sikhs and Hindus) on their way to Anandpur Sahib and back to their homes. The used to rest at Baba Moti Ram's mud house where his mother and wife used to prepare food for these pilgrims.

=== Martydom ===
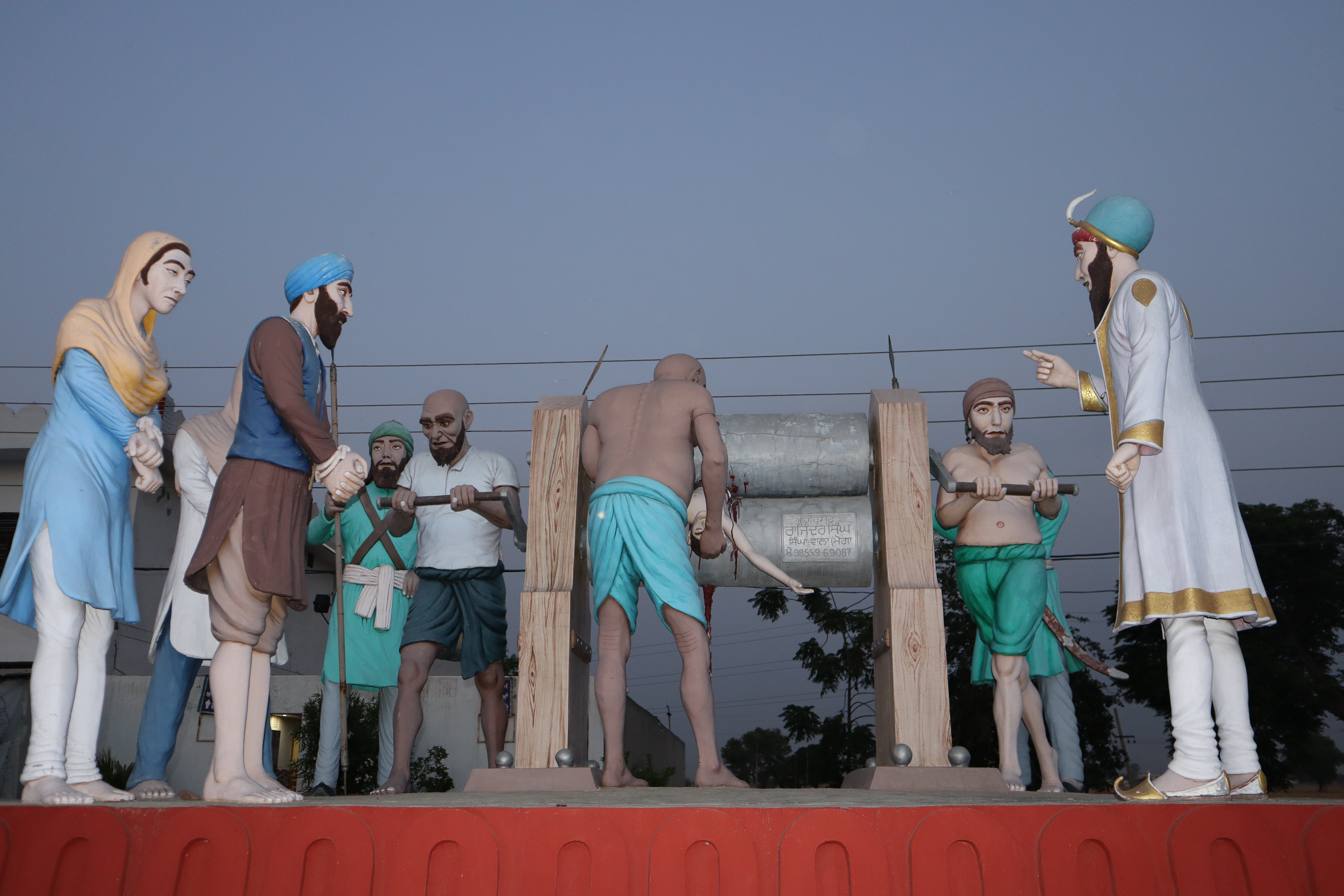
Diorama sculptural monument of the torture & execution of Baba Moti Ram & his family at Gurdwara Shaheed Baba Tega Singh Ji, Chand Purana, Bagha Purana tehsil, Moga district, Punjab, India, April 2023

Moti Ram Mehra, disregarding the risk to his own life, managed to enter the Thanda Burj and served milk to Mata Gujri, Baba Zorawar Singh and Baba Fateh Singh, the sons of Guru Gobind Singh for three nights, where they were kept under arrest as political prisoners by the Mughal Governor of Sirhind. On 27 December 1704, the Sahibzadas were martyred, and Mata Gujri also died.

The Nawab was informed that his servant had served those prisoners with milk and water. Nawab Wazir Khan ordered the arrest of Baba Moti Ram Mehra, his mother, wife, and son. He did not conceal his act and boldly told the Nawab that it was his pious duty to serve the imprisoned children and their grandmother. Hence Baba Moti Ram Mehra, along with his family, was sentenced to death by being squeezed in a Kohlu (oil press). His sacrifice was first sermonized by Baba Banda Singh Bahadur.

According to Dr. Manmohan Singh Bhagowalia, some references about Baba Moti Ram are found in books such as 'Bansavalinaama Dasan Patshahiyaan Ka' by Kesar Singh Chhibber, 'Katha Guru Sutan Ki' by Dunna Singh Handuria, 'Gurpur Prakash' by Santren Bhai Prem Singh and 'Shaheednaama' by poet Kishan Singh.

== Memorial Gurdwara and gate ==
- The Gurudwara in the memory of Baba Moti Ram is situated at a short distance from Gurudwara Sri Fatehgarh Sahib at Bassi Road, Opp. Roza Sharif, Sri Fatehgarh Sahib. It was constructed by the Amar Shaheed Baba Moti Ram Mehra Charitable Trust.
- Baba Moti Ram Mehra Memorial Gate was constructed by Punjab Government in remembrance of his great sacrifices.
- Baba Moti Ram Mehra Park is a park located in Fatehgarh Sahib, Punjab. It is about 0.49 kilometers away from the Fatehgarh Sahib railway station.

== See also ==
- Saka Sirhind
- Shaheedi Jor Mela
- Diwan Todar Mal
