= Mahi Singh =

Sikh martyr

Bhai Mahi Singh (died 9 September 1712) was a Sikh martyr.

== Family history ==
Bhai Mahi Singh belonged to the Kamboj (joshan) landlord family of Sunam. He had taken Amrit from Guru Gobind Singh at the time of the Vaisakhi of 1699. He was the son of Bhai Bhikha Singh, grandson of Bhai Murari, great-grandson of Bhai Bhura, and great-great-grandson of Bhai Sukhia Mandan of Ladwa.

== Martyrdom of Bhai Mahi Singh ==
Bhai Mahi Singh later died, a martyr to the Sikh cause, while fighting valiantly at the Battle of Chappar Chiri under the standard of Banda Bahadur, twenty kilometres from Sirhind on May 12, 1710 AD. Another source states he was martyred on 9 September 1712 by being wrapped in cotton and being burnt to death in Samba alongside his brother, Bhai Dargahi Singh.
