= Diwan Todar Mal =

Figure in Sikh history

- Diwan Todarmal Jain Hall in Gurudwara Fatehgarh Sahib

Diwan Todar Mal was a historical Jain figure from Sirhind who played a role in Sikh history during the period of Guru Gobind Singh. He is remembered by Sikhs for his actions to help the Sikhs cremate the remains of Guru Gobind Singh's two sons and mother during the persecution of Sikhs by the Mughals during the early 18th century.

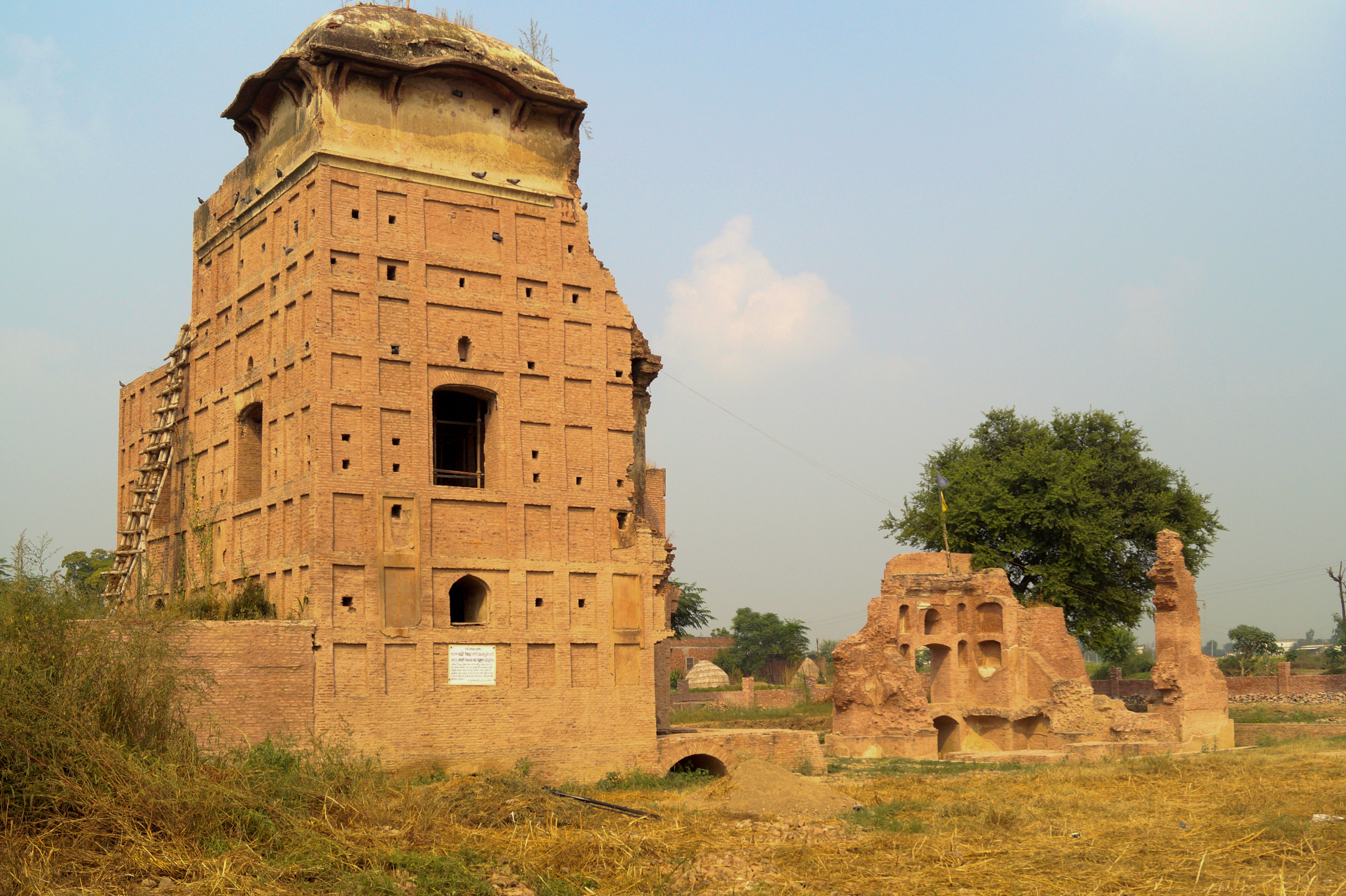
Haveli Todar Mal, once used as royal residence by Diwan Todar Mal

== Biography ==
Diwan Todar Mal was an Oswal Śvetāmbara Jain and 'Dewan' in the court of Mughal Nawab of Sirhind, Wazir Khan.

In Sikh history, he is remembered for buying a small piece of land at a very huge price, reputed to be the world's costliest land ever bought, for the cremation of the dead bodies of Mata Gujri, the mother and Sahibzada Zorawar Singh and Baba Fateh Singh, the two younger sons of 10th Sikh Guru, Guru Gobind Singh in 1704 A.D, by paying an exorbitant price to the Wazir Khan 'Governor Of Sirhind'. He had to cover the whole piece of land with gold coins (ashrafis) in a vertical position, as he was asked to vertically place gold coins on the land and only that much land was given to him which he could cover with gold coins. He later also made arrangements for their cremation. But, according to Harjinder Singh Dilgeer, the bodies of all the three were cremated by the descendants of Todar Mall Shahjahani because the latter had already died in 1665–66.

Todar Mal, however had to bear the brunt of Wazir Khan's wrath, and he and his family had to abandon the haveli soon after, and themselves faded into oblivion, with dilapidated building being their only reminder. In the coming years, the haveli fell into rapid disrepair, and collapsed at many place. Though it survived ransacking of Sirhind by Banda Bahadur and during the reign of The Sikh Confederacy, the haveli was left untouched out of respect for Diwan Todar Mal.

== Legacy ==
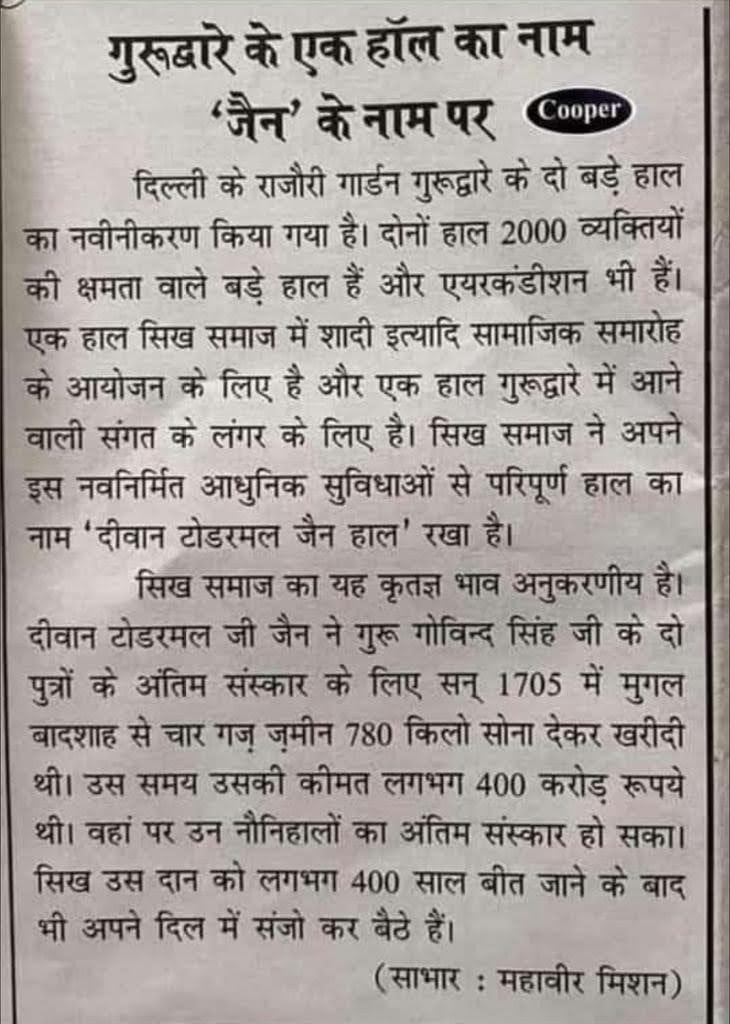
Description of a notice isssued by the Gurudwara at Rajouri Garden on naming its main hall Diwan Todarmal Jain Hall on sacred occasion of Mahavir Jayanti.

Today, Gurdwara Jyoti Sarup stands where these three martyrs were cremated and the road connecting the two Gurdwaras is known as Dewan Todar Mal Marg. Even today Diwan Todar Mal is deeply respected by the Sikhs and a Diwan Todar Mal Memorial Hall, congregation hall has been constructed at historic Gurudwara Fatehgarh Sahib by SGPC.
