= Mata Gujri =

Sikh martyr

- ਮਾਤਾ ਗੁਜਰੀ
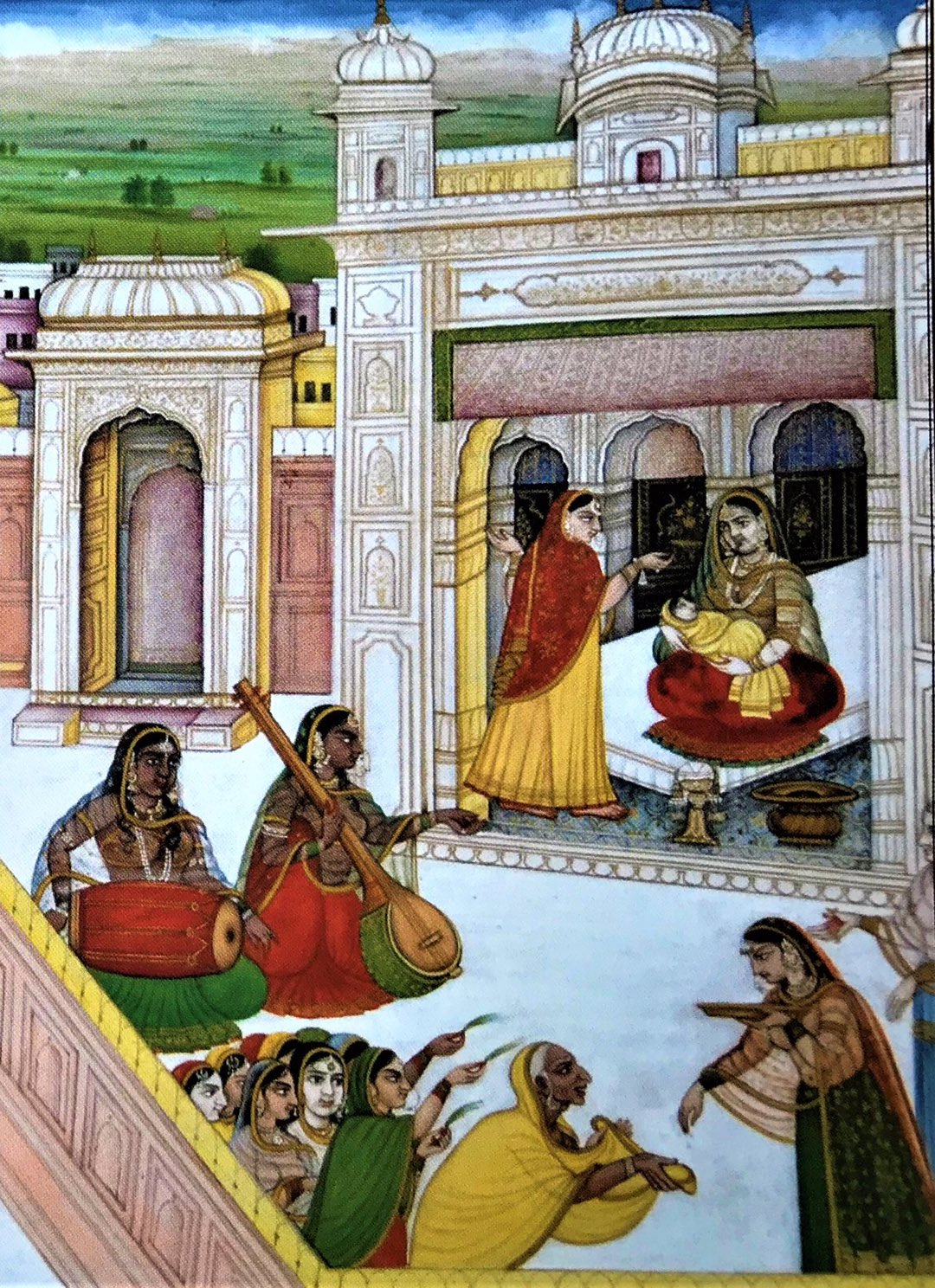
- Newborn Gobind Rai cradled by Mata Gujari (top-right) during celebrations led by female musicians in Patna
- Title: Mata; Guru Mahal

Personal life
- Born: Gujri Subhiki; 1624 Kartarpur, Punjab, India
- Died: 1705 (aged 81) Sirhind, Punjab (present-day Fatehgarh Sahib)
- Cause of death: Hypothermia
- Spouse: Guru Tegh Bahadur (wedded on 4 February 1633)
- Children: Guru Gobind Singh
- Parents: Bhai Lal Chand Subhiki of Lakhnoor (father); Bibi Bishan Kaur (mother)

Religious life
- Religion: Sikhism

Mata Gujri (Gurmukhi: ਮਾਤਾ ਗੁਜਰੀ; mātā gujarī; 1624–1705), also spelt as Mata Gujari, was the wife of Guru Tegh Bahadur, the ninth Guru of Sikhism, and the mother of Guru Gobind Singh, the tenth Guru of Sikhism. She played a central role in the history of Sikhism and is one of the four consorts bestowed with the title of Guru-Mahal.

== Biography ==
=== Early life ===
Mata Gujri was born to Lal Chand, a Subhikkhī Khatri and Mata Bishan Devi, who lived at Kartarpur.

She was betrothed to Guru Tegh Bahadur in 1629 when he visited Kartarpur for the marriage celebrations of his brother, Suraj Mal. She married Guru Tegh Bahadur at Kartarpur on 4 February 1633 and joined her husband's family in Amritsar. In 1635 the family moved to Kiratpur and, on the death in 1644 of Guru Tegh Bahadur's father, Guru Hargobind, Mata Gujri moved with her husband and mother-in-law, Mata Nanaki, to Bakala, near Amritsar.

Soon after he was installed as Guru in 1664, Guru Tegh Bahadur founded a new village, which he called Chakk Nanaki, after his mother. The place, now a city, is now known as Anandpur Sahib. Not long after this, the Guru set out on a long journey, leaving his wife and mother-in-law at Patna.

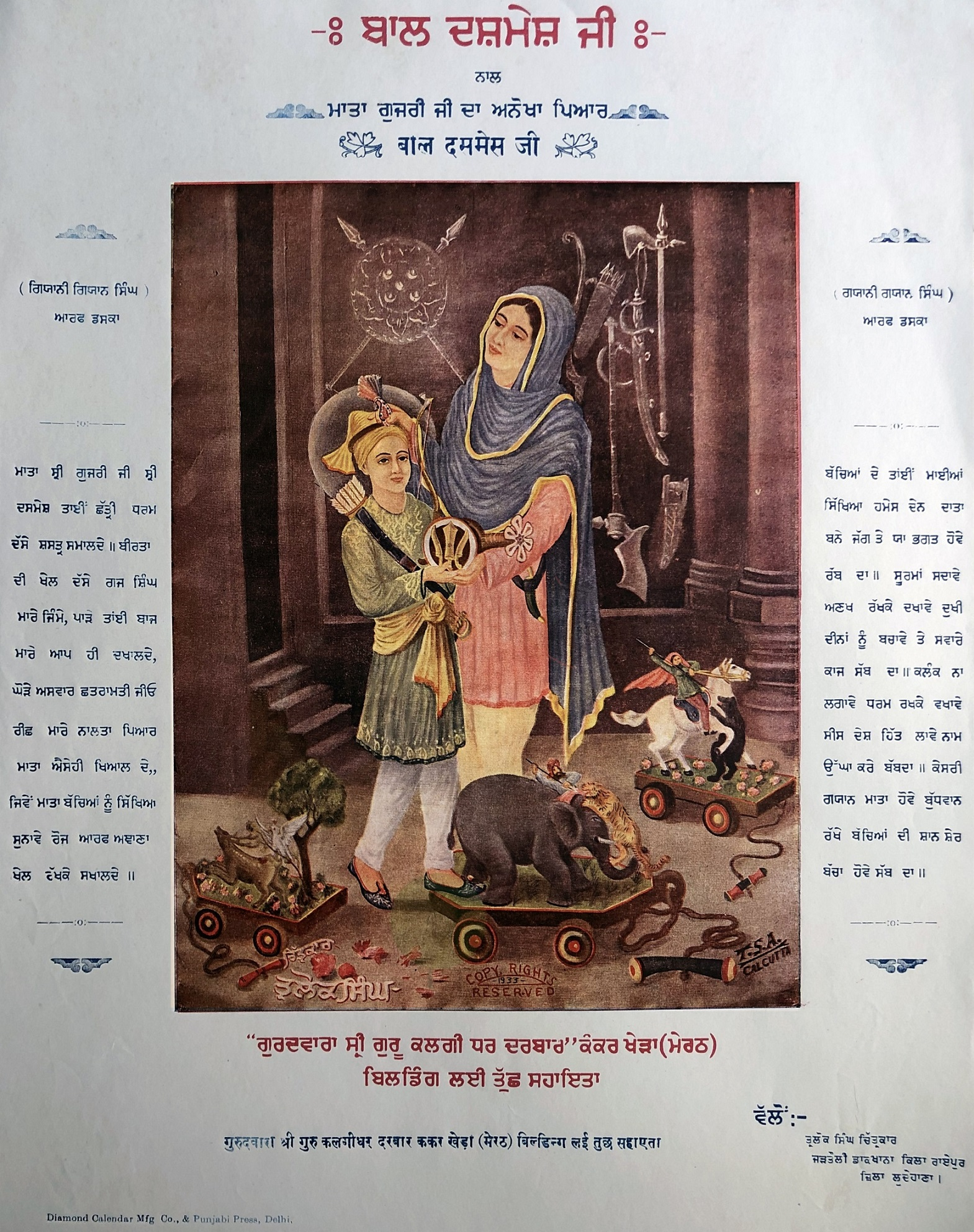
Painting by Trilok Singh in 1933 depicting Gobind Das with his mother Mata Gujri. This work is based upon a poem written on margins.

On 22 December 1666 Mata Gujri gave birth to Gobind Rai, who later became Guru Gobind Singh. Guru Tegh Bahadur returned to Patna in 1670 and instructed the family to leave for Lakhnaur. Mata Gujri reached Lakhnaur on 13 September 1670 and was accompanied by the aged Mata Nanaki and her son, Guru Gobind Singh. At Lakhnaur, she stayed with her brother, Mehar Chand. After Lakhnaur, the family proceeded to Chakk Nanaki (now known as Anandpur Sahib) where Guru Tegh Bahadur rejoined them in March 1671. After the martyrdom of Guru Tegh Bahadur, the responsibility for managing the affairs of Chakk Nanaki fell to her at first as Guru Gobind Rai was still young. Her younger brother, Kirpal Chand, assisted her in this affair.

=== Later life ===
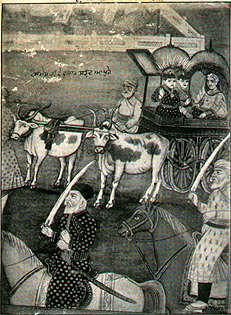
Painting of Mata Gujri, Sahibzada Zorawar Singh, and Sahibzada Fateh Singh, after the Anandpur battle, reach Sirhind, where the princes, Zorawar Singh and Fateh Singh, were executed by immurement, circa 19th century

During the evacuation of Anandpur during the Mughal siege of Anandpur in December 1704 or 1705, she was accompanied by Zorawar Singh and Fateh Singh (younger two sons of Guru Gobind Singh) when they became separated from the main group of evacuees whilst crossing the Sarsa rivulet, as a battle took place between the Sikh evacuees and pursuing Mughal troops. A Brahmin servant, named Gangu, led Mata Gujri and her two younger grandchildren to his village named Saheri, located in present-day Ropar district. He is said to have then deceitfully betrayed them to two Muslim officers of Morinda and the three were arrested on 8 December. After this, they were confined to the Thanda Burj (cold tower) located at the fort of Sirhind. On the same day as the execution of the younger Sahibzades, Mata Gujri died in the cold tower. Diwan Todar Mal, whom was a benevolent and wealthy local of Sirhind, cremated the three the next day.

It is said that Todar Mal of Sirhind paid heavy price of gold coins standing on their edge to recover the bodies of Mata Gujri and the Sahibzades.

== Legacy ==
Her father's ancestral village was Lakhnaur Sahib, 13 kilometres (8.1 mi) south of Ambala in Haryana, where the road from Ambala to popular pilgrimage site of Gurudawara Lakhnaur Sahib was named after her by the Government of Haryana in 2017.

== See also ==
- Moti Ram Mehra
- Saka Sirhind
- Diwan Todar Mal
- Shaheedi Jor Mela
