= Zorawar Singh (Sikhism) =

Sikh martyr (1696–1704)

Sahibzada Baba Zorawar Singh Ji
- ਜ਼ੋਰਾਵਰ ਸਿੰਘ, ਸਾਹਿਬਜ਼ਾਦਾ
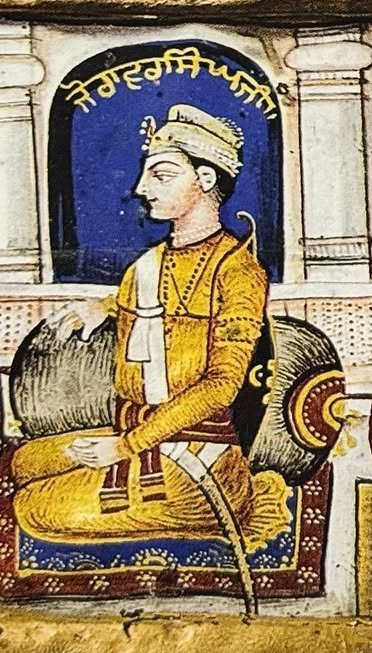
- Detail of Sahibzada Zorawar Singh from a mural depicting Guru Gobind Singh and his four sons (the Sahibzadas) located within Takht Hazur Sahib

Personal life
- Born: 17 November 1696 Anandpur, India
- Died: 26 December 1704 (aged 8) Fatehgarh Sahib, India
- Cause of death: Extrajudicial execution by Immurement
- Parent(s): Guru Gobind Singh, Mata Jito
- Relatives: Sahibzada Ajit Singh (half-brother) Sahibzada Jujhar Singh (brother) Sahibzada Fateh Singh (brother)

Religious life
- Religion: Sikhism

Zorawar Singh (Punjabi: ਸਾਹਿਬਜ਼ਾਦਾ ਜ਼ੋਰਾਵਰ ਸਿੰਘ, pronunciation: [säːɦɪbd͡ʒäːd̪ɛ d͡ʒoɾäːʋaɾ sɪ́ŋgᵊ]; 17 November 1696 – 26 December 1704), alternatively spelt as Jorawar Singh, was a son of Guru Gobind Singh. Zorawar was executed in the court of Wazir Khan, the Mughal Governor of Sirhind.

== Background ==
In 1699, the Pahari Rajas of the Shiwalik Hills, frustrated with increasing Sikh ascendancy in the region, requested aid from Aurangzeb; their combined forces took on the Khalsa, led by Guru Gobind Singh, at Anandapur but were defeated. Another faceoff followed in the neighboring Nirmoh but ended in Sikh victory; there was probably another conflict in Anandapur (c. 1702) to the same outcome. In 1704, the Rajahs mounted a renewed offensive against Guru Gobind Singh in Anandapur, but facing imminent defeat, requested aid from Aurangzeb. While the Mughal subahdars came to aid, they failed to change the course of the battle. Accordingly, the Rajahs decided to lay siege to the town rather than engage in open warfare.

By 1704, Guru Gobind Singh and his Sikhs were under immense pressure as the Mughals and hill chiefs laid siege to Anandpur Sahib, cutting off all supplies and forcing the Sikhs to survive on leaves and tree bark. Many, including the Guru’s mother, urged him to accept Wazir Khan’s offer of safe passage, backed by an oath on the Quran and promises from the hill chiefs. Knowing the enemy’s deceit, the Guru tested their sincerity by sending out bullock carts filled with worthless items, which were immediately looted. Despite this betrayal, continued pressure from his followers and mother left him with no choice but to agree to leave. On the night of 20–21 December 1704, under cold winds and rain, the Guru’s family and a group of Sikhs left first, led by Udai Singh, while the Guru planned to follow. However, as they moved out, the Mughals and hill forces broke their oath and attacked, leading to the chaotic and tragic Battle of Sarsa, where the Sikhs were scattered, and many lost their lives.

== Death ==
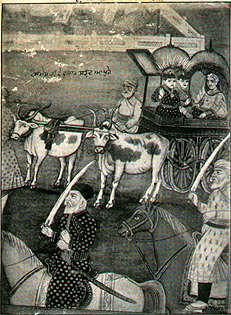
Painting of Mata Gujri, Sahibzada Zorawar Singh, and Sahibzada Fateh Singh, after the Anandpur battle, reach Sirhind, where the princes, Zorawar Singh and Fateh Singh, were executed by immurement, circa 19th century

Gangu, along with Mata Gujri and the two young princes, Zorawar Singh and Fateh Singh, had crossed the flooded Sarsa River. They traveled to Rupar and then took the road to Morinda, where Gangu’s village, Saheri, was located. By this time, news of Guru Gobind Singh’s battle had spread everywhere. Fearing for his own safety, Gangu decided to betray them. He informed the government officials in Morinda about the people staying with him. As a result, Mata Gujri and the two children were arrested and sent to Sirhind, the headquarters of Wazir Khan. Gangu was rewarded with a simple "Shabash" (a word of praise), while the three captives were locked in a cold tower called Thanda Burj. Though this tower was used as a summer retreat for officials, it was extremely uncomfortable during the harsh winter, especially for the elderly Mata Gujri and the two young boys, who were just eight and five years old. Some Sikh accounts note Singh's two younger sons — Zorawar Singh and Fateh Singh — to have successfully fought at Chamkaur before being captured. Other accounts note that they along with their grandmother had been separated from the Sikh retinue while migrating away from Anandapur; subsequently, they were betrayed by local officials and handed over to the Mughals. Sukha Singh and Ratan Singh Bhangu, in particular, blame a greedy Brahmin for the betrayal.

Wazir Khan was furious that he had failed to capture the Guru Gobind Singh. In his frustration, he decided to target the young sons of the Guru. On 24 December 1704, the two boys were brought before his court in a grand public gathering. Hundreds of armed soldiers stood around them to intimidate them. The Nawab’s men told the boys that their father, Guru Gobind Singh, their older brothers, and all Sikhs had been killed. They were offered a safe and comfortable life if they agreed to convert to Islam. However, the young princes boldly refused the offer, showing no fear. They reminded the court that their grandfather, Guru Tegh Bahadur, had also refused to convert to Islam and was martyred for his faith. A courtier named Suchanand Khatri insulted them, saying that the children of a snake are always venomous.

The next day, 25 December, the boys were once again brought to the court. The officials used various methods to pressure them into converting, but nothing could shake their determination. Even Nawab Sher Muhammad Khan of Malerkotla, who had fought against Guru Gobind Singh in battle and lost his own relatives, was deeply moved by the courage of the young princes. Though he was opposed to the Guru, he refused to take part in harming the children when Wazir Khan asked him to. Wazir Khan ordered their execution. In early Sikh accounts, they were simply beheaded, but in popular Sikh tradition, they are believed to have been "bricked" (entombed) alive, sentencing them to be bricked up in a wall. Even as they were placed inside, the boys remained steadfast in their faith. Enraged by their defiance, the soldiers pushed down the temporary wall made of mud and bricks. Finally, on 27 December 1704, the young princes were beheaded, and their bodies were disrespectfully discarded. Upon seeing their lifeless bodies, Mata Gujri could not bear the pain and passed away.

== Legacy ==
A kind-hearted wealthy man named Diwan Todar Mal, who was a banker, took the responsibility of giving the children and Mata Gujri a proper cremation. He bought a piece of land for their funeral by laying gold coins on the ground as payment. The place where their bodies were discarded is now known as Gurdwara Fatehgarh Sahib. Another Gurdwara, called Joti Sarup, marks the site where their cremation took place Fatehgarh Sahib. Every year, two fairs are held at Gurdwara Fatehgarh Sahib—one in December to honor the children’s martyrdom and another in March during the festival of Hola Mohalla. Near Sirhind, there is also a memorial dedicated to Mata Gujri,

== See also ==
- Ajit Singh
- Fateh Singh
- Jujhar Singh
- Martyrdom in Sikhism
