= Fateh Singh (Sikhism) =

Fourth son of Guru Gobind Singh (1699–1704/5)

Sahibzada Baba Fateh Singh Ji
- ਬਾਬਾ ਫ਼ਤਿਹ ਸਿੰਘ ਜੀ, ਸਾਹਿਬਜ਼ਾਦਾ
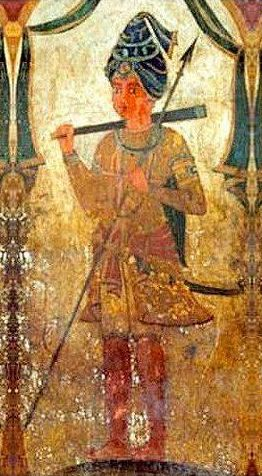
- Fresco art depicting Fateh Singh, son of Guru Gobind Singh, from Pothimala, Guru Harsahai
- Title: Sahibzada

Personal life
- Born: 25 February 1699 Anandpur Sahib
- Died: 27 December 1704 (aged 5) or 26 December 1705 (aged 6) Sirhind, Fathegarh Sahib, Punjab, India
- Cause of death: Extrajudicial execution by immurement
- Resting place: Gurdwara Jyoti Sarup; 30.642735, 76.404262
- Parents: Guru Gobind Singh (father); Mata Jito (mother)
- Known for: Progenitor of Nihangs/Akalis
- Relatives: Guru Teg Bahadur (grandfather); Ajit Singh (half-brother); Jujhar Singh (brother); Zorawar Singh (brother)

Religious life
- Religion: Sikhism

Fateh Singh (Punjabi: ਫ਼ਤਿਹ ਸਿੰਘ, pronunciation: [pʰat̪ɪɦ sɪ́ŋgᵊ]; 25 February 1699 – 26 December 1704 or 26 December 1705 (Note: Different sources give varying dates for his birth and death.)), commonly referred to with honorifics as Baba Fateh Singh or Sahibzada Baba Fateh Singh, was the fourth and youngest son of Guru Gobind Singh.

== Biography ==
He was born at the site where the modern-day Gurdwara Bhora Sahib stands in Anandpur and was reared in the same locality. He was raised by his paternal grandmother, Mata Gujri, after the passing of his mother, Mata Jito, in December 1700.

By 1704, Guru Gobind Singh and his Sikhs were under immense pressure as the Mughals and hill chiefs laid siege to Anandpur Sahib, cutting off all supplies and forcing the Sikhs to survive on leaves and tree bark. Many, including the Guru’s mother, urged him to accept Wazir Khan’s offer of safe passage, backed by an oath on the Quran and promises from the hill chiefs. Knowing the enemy’s deceit, the Guru tested their sincerity by sending out bullock carts filled with worthless items, which were immediately looted. Despite this betrayal, continued pressure from his followers and mother left him with no choice but to agree to leave. On the night of 20–21 December 1704, under cold winds and rain, the Guru’s family and a group of Sikhs left first, led by Udai Singh, while the Guru planned to follow. However, as they moved out, the Mughals and hill forces broke their oath and attacked, leading to the chaotic and tragic Battle of Sarsa, where the Sikhs were scattered, and many lost their lives.

Gangu, along with Mata Gujri and the two young princes, Baba Zorawar Singh and Fateh Singh, had crossed the flooded Sarsa River. They traveled to Rupar and then took the road to Morinda where Gangu’s village, Saheri, was located. By this time, news of Guru Gobind Singh’s battle had spread everywhere. Fearing for his own safety, Gangu decided to betray them. He informed the government officials in Morinda about the identity of the people staying with him. As a result, Mata Gujri and the two children were arrested and sent to Sirhind, the headquarters of Wazir Khan. Gangu was rewarded with a simple "Shabash" (a word of praise), while the three captives were locked in a cold tower called Thanda Burj. This tower was used as a summer retreat for officials, and was extremely uncomfortable during the harsh winter, especially for the elderly Mata Gujri and the two young boys, who were just eight and five years old. Other accounts note Singh's two younger sons—Zorowar Singh and Fateh Singh—to have successfully fought at Chamkaur before being captured.

== Death ==
The sons were taken to Sirhind and coerced to convert to Islam in the court of Wazir Khan, the provincial governor. Both the children steadfastly refused to convert and were executed. In early Sikh accounts, they were simply beheaded; in popular Sikh tradition, they are held to have been "bricked" (entombed) alive.

He was executed in Sirhind at the age of 6, alongside his elder brother Zorawar Singh, by being entombed alive in a brick wall and after they fell unconscious, they were taken out of the wall and killed. Guru Gobind Singh learnt of the deaths of his sons, Fateh Singh and Zorowar Singh, while he was staying at the village of Jatpura. Mata Gujri is claimed to have died of shock on hearing of the deaths of her two youngest grandsons.

Their bodies were disrespectfully discarded. A wealthy Jain merchant named Diwan Todar Mal, who was a banker, took the responsibility of giving the children and Mata Gujri a proper cremation. He bought a piece of land for their funeral by laying gold coins on the ground as payment. The place where their bodies were discarded is now known as Gurdwara Fatehgarh Sahib. Another Gurdwara, called Joti Sarup, marks the site where their cremation took place. Fatehgarh Sahib Every year, two fairs are held at Gurdwara Fatehgarh Sahib—one in December to honor the children’s martyrdom and another in March during the festival of Hola Mohalla. Near Sirhind, there is also a memorial dedicated to Mata Gujri.

Baba Fateh Singh Ji's age is considered as 7 years and Indian Government has announced his martyr day as Veer Bal Diwas.

== Legacy ==
According to one theory regarding the genesis of the Akali Nihang tradition, they stem from Fateh Singh, with their characteristic blue garbs and turbans tracing their origin to the uniform of Fateh Singh and being prescribed by Guru Gobind Singh for his warriors.

"One day Fateh Singh Ji dressed all in blue supporting a high turban Dmala [sic; Dumalla, a style of Sikh turban] with a piece of loose cloth hanging out on top Farla [flag on top of Nihang turbans]. His clothing decked out in all manner of weapons came into the midst of his farther ahead of a large army of other children. Fateh Singh was only five years old at the time. His demeanour was extremely fierce. At this young age it is said he could handle himself against a grown adult warrior with a sword stick. So no Sikh dare cross him. It is said seeing him dressed the way he was he inspired awe but being a child also laughter. But no Sikh dare laugh. Then the Guru himself burst out laughing after him all other Akalis and Sikhs. Fateh Singh ran to his farther [sic; father]. Guru Gobind Singh sitting him on his lap blessed him and said, 'After you like you a Panth of fierce warriors Akali Nihangs shall come into being.'"

— Nirdr Singh, The Fighting Traditions and Fighting Arts of the Traditional Sikh Warriors the Beloved of Guru Gobind Singh Ji the Akali Nihangs (1998), page 8

The Prime Minister Narendra Modi has paid homage to the Chaar Sahibazde on various occasions, particularly during the celebration of their bravery and sacrifice on Veer Bal Diwas (Day of Brave Children). Veer Bal Diwas is observed in honour of the Chaar Sahibzaade, who are remembered greatly amongst Sikhs across the globe.

== Gallery ==
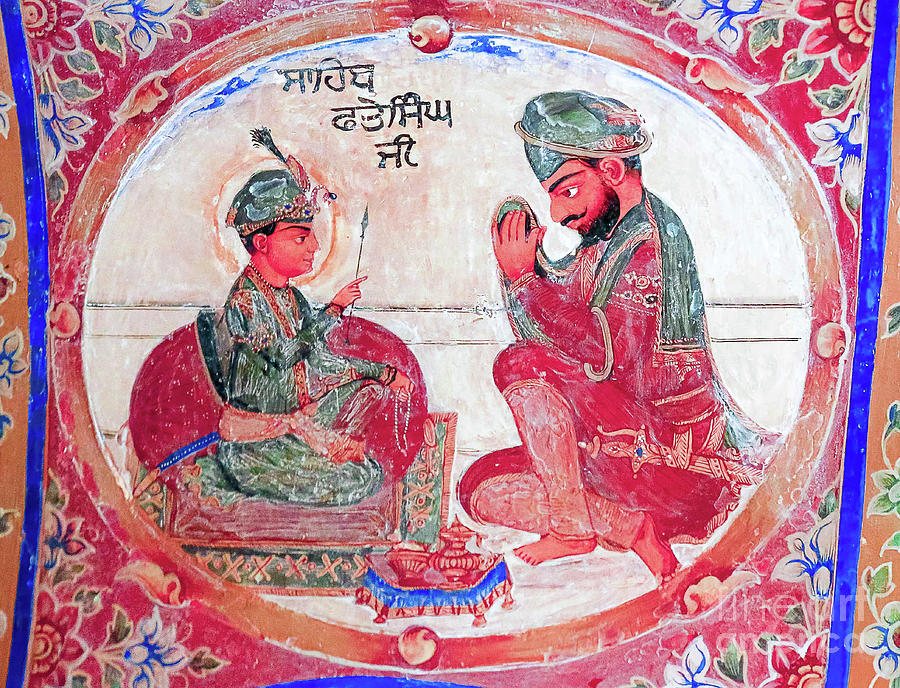
Fresco of Sahibzada Fateh Singh from Gurdwara Baba Atal

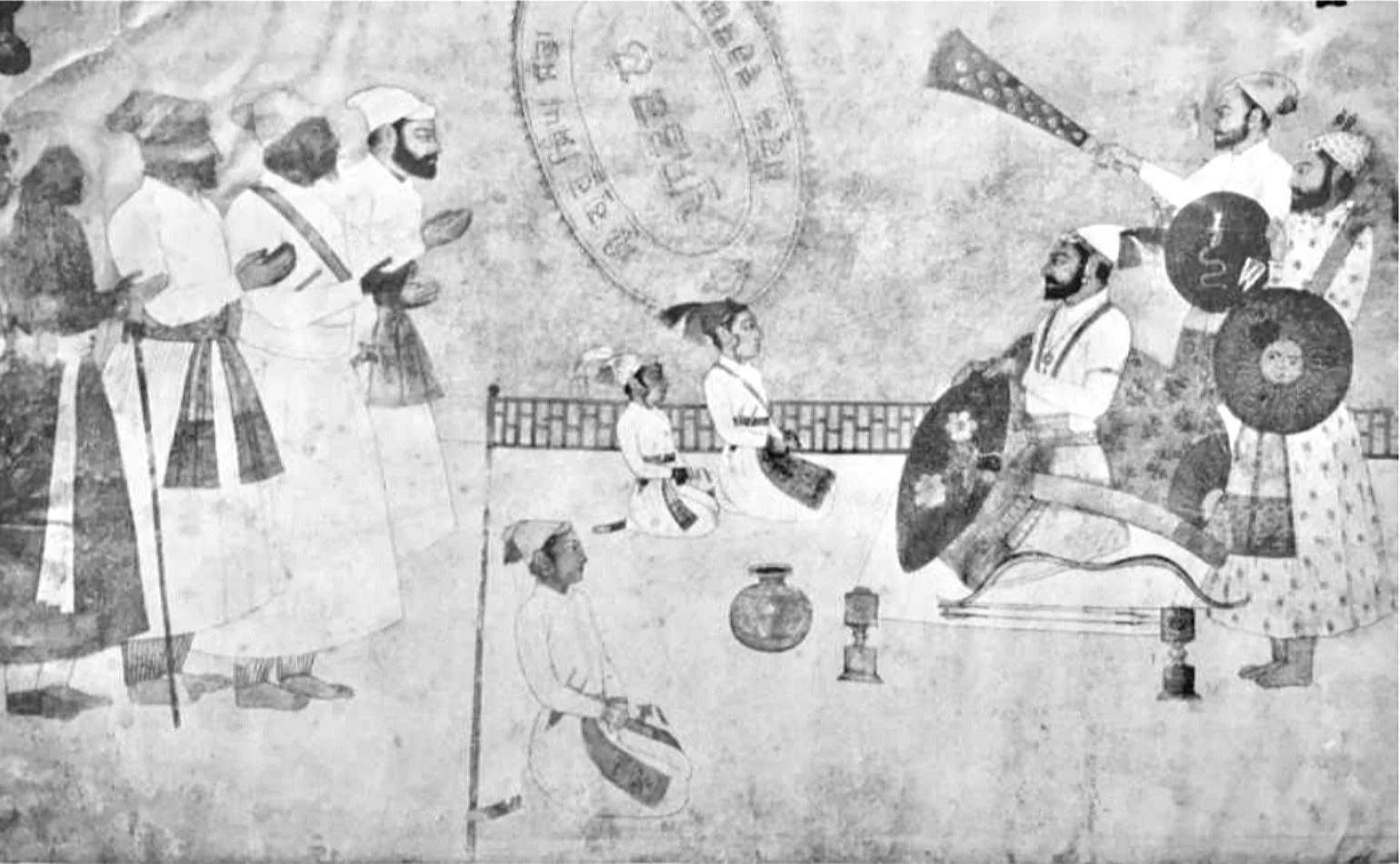
Guru Gobind Singh with three of his sons in Anandpur in the year 1698. Sahibzada Fateh Singh is not shown as he would have been an infant at the time or he was not born yet (depending on what is accepted as his birth date).

== See also ==
- Ajit Singh (half-brother)
- Jujhar Singh (brother)
- Zorawar Singh (brother)
- Martyrdom in Sikhism
- Dumalla
