= Economy of Punjab, India =

Economy of Punjab
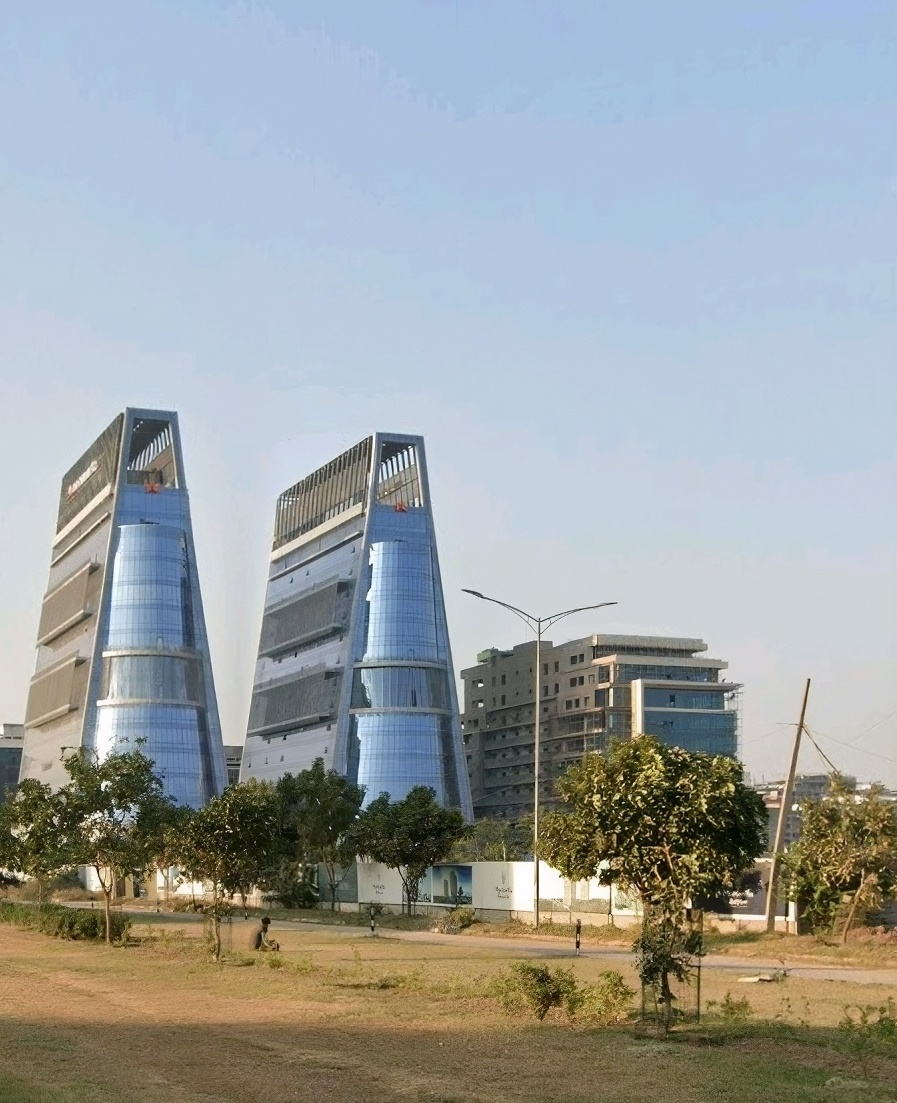
- JLPL Industrial Area
- Currency: Indian Rupee (INR, ₹)
- Fiscal year: 1 April – 31 March

Statistics
- Population: Around 27.7 million (2011 Census of India)
- GDP: ▲₹9.8 lakh crore (US$100 billion) (nominal) ▲ ~US$475 billion (PPP)
- GDP rank: 16th
- GDP growth: ▲9.9% (2025-26 est.)
- GDP per capita: ▲₹230,523 (US$2,400) (nominal) (2025–26) ▲ ~US$11,360 (PPP)
- GDP per capita rank: 19th
- GDP by sector: ▼ Agriculture 25% Industry 25% ▲ Services 50% (2020-21)
- Inflation (CPI): ▼3.55% (February 2025)
- Base borrowing rate: 6.0% (as on 12 July 2019)
- Population below national poverty line: ▼4.26% (2025–26) (5th)
- Human Development Index: ▲0.738 high (2023) (12st)
- Unemployment: ▲5.9% (2023–2024) (13th)

Public finance
- Government debt: ▲44.8% of GSDP (2025-26 est.)
- Budget balance: ▲₹34,201 crore (US$3.6 billion) (3.84% of GSDP) (2025-26 est.)
- Revenue: ▲₹112,431 crore (US$12 billion) (2025-26 est.)
- Spending: ▲₹146,632 crore (US$15 billion) (2025-26 est.)
- All values, unless otherwise stated, are in US dollars.

The economy of Punjab is the 16th largest state economy in India with 8.91 lakh crore (US$110 billion) in gross domestic product (GDP) for the 2025-26 fiscal year. Its GDP ranks 16th amongst Indian states with US$2720 (2,27,950) per capita.

Until the early 1970s, Punjab had a high rate of economic growth but has since lagged behind. Punjab ranked first in GDP per capita amongst Indian states in 1981 and fourth in 2001, but has experienced slower growth than the rest of India in recent years, having the second-slowest GDP per capita growth rate of all Indian states and union territories (UTs) between 2000 and 2010, behind only Manipur. Between 1992 and 2014, Punjab's life expectancy also grew slower than most Indian states, rising from 69.4 to 71.4 years. During this period, Punjab's rank amongst Indian states in life expectancy at birth fell from first to sixth.

The state's economy is dominated primarily by agricultural production and small and medium-sized enterprises. Punjab has the ninth highest ranking among Indian states and UTs in human development index as of 2018.

== History ==
In the year 1981, Punjab had the highest per capita GDP in comparison with other states in India, and in 2001, it stood at number four. However, since then, growth in Punjab has been slower than the growth in India's overall economy. In the period between 2000 and 2010, growth in per capita GDP for Punjab was the second-slowest in the whole of India, after Manipur. Therefore, the state's rank in terms of per capita income fell to the 19th place in 2026.

=== Ancient and medieval eras (pre-1526) ===
==== Indus Valley Civilisation ====
The people of the Indus Valley Civilisation, a permanent settlement that flourished between 2800 BC and 1800 BC, practised agriculture and animal domestication, used uniform weights and measures, made tools and weapons, and traded with other cities.

The civilization had knowledge of urban planning, with evidence of well-planned streets, a drainage system, a water supply, and the first-known urban sanitation system. There is also evidence of a form of municipal government.

==== Mahajanapadas ====
Silver punch-marked coins were minted as currency during the period of intensive trade activity and urban development by the Mahajanapadas.

==== Silk Road ====
Scholars suggest that trading from India to West Asia and Eastern Europe via the silk road was active between the 14th and 18th centuries. Most overland trade was carried out via the Khyber Pass, connecting the Punjab region with Afghanistan and continuing into the Middle East and Central Asia.

==== Medieval period ====
Although many kingdoms and rulers issued coins, barter was prevalent in the region. Villages paid a portion of their agricultural produce as revenue to the rulers, while their craftsmen received a part of the crops at harvest time for their services.

=== Mughal era (1526–1738) ===
The Mughal Empire ruled over Punjab from 1526 to 1738, controlling its economy and implementing Islamic economics. It was under Mughal rule that barter became less common in Punjab and a monetary system was fully established.

=== Sikh era (1738–1849) ===
==== Sikh Confederacy (1738–1799) ====
The barons collected a very moderate rent, and that mostly in kind. Their soldiery never molested the husbandman; the baron never levied the whole of his share; and in the country, perhaps, never was a cultivator treated with more indulgence. Moreover, the baron did not interfere with old and hereditary land tenures. The rules of haq shufd did not permit land to be sold to an outsider. New fields, or residential sites could be broken out of waste land as such land was available in plenty. Duties on traders and merchants also brought some revenue. The Sikh barons gave full protection to traders passing through their territories.

— James Browne, a contemporary British East India Company Employee

Extensive and valuable commerce was maintained in their territories which was extended to distant quarters of India.

— George Forster, who traveled to Punjab in 1783

The decline of the Mughal Empire left a power vacuum in the Punjab, which resulted in constant conflict until the formation of the Sikh Empire. The conflict severely damaged the economy.

==== Sikh Empire (1799–1849) ====
Ranjit Singh, Maharaja of the Sikh Empire from 1801–1839, ensured that Punjab manufactured all weapons, equipment and munitions his army needed, being self-sufficient. His government invested in some infrastructure during the 1800s and thereafter, established raw materials mines, cannon foundries, and factories for gunpowder and arms. Some of these operations were owned by the state, others operated by private Sikh entities.

However, Ranjit Singh did not make major investments in other infrastructure such as irrigation canals to improve the productivity of land and roads. The prosperity in his empire, in contrast to the Mughal–Sikh wars era, largely came from the improvement in the security situation, reduction in violence, reopened trade routes and greater freedom to conduct commerce.

Under Sikh rule, the Nanakshahi rupee (issued by the Sikhs and named after Guru Nanak, the founder of Sikhism) was the predominant currency.

=== British era (1849–1947) ===
==== Agriculture ====
Within a few years of its annexation, Punjab was regarded as British India's model agricultural province. From the 1860s onwards, agricultural prices and land values soared in the Punjab. This stemmed from increasing political security and improvements in infrastructure and communications. New cash crops such as wheat, tobacco, sugar cane and cotton were introduced to the region. By the 1920s, Punjab produced a tenth of India's total cotton crops and a third of its wheat crops. Per capita output of all the crops in the province increased by approximately 45 percent between 1891 and 1921, a growth contrasting to agricultural crises in Bengal, Bihar and Orissa during the period.

In 1885, the Punjab administration of the British Raj began a plan to transform over six million acres of barren land in central and western Punjab into irrigable agricultural land. The creation of canal colonies was designed to relieve demographic pressures in the central parts of the province, increase productivity and revenues, and create support for the British amongst peasant landholders. The colonisation resulted in an agricultural revolution in the province, rapid industrial growth, and the resettlement of over one million Punjabis in the new areas. A number of towns were created or saw significant development in the colonies, such as Lyallpur, Sargodha, and Montgomery. Colonisation led to the size of canal irrigated area in Punjab increasing from three to fourteen million acres in the period from 1885 to 1947.

An agricultural college was also established in British India, now known as University of Agriculture Faisalabad. Rapid agricultural growth, combined with access to easy credit for landowners, led to a growing crisis of indebtedness. When landowners were unable to pay down their loans, urban based moneylenders took advantage of the law to foreclose debts of mortgaged land. This led to a situation where land increasingly passed to absentee moneylenders who had little connection to the villages were the land was located. The colonial government recognised this as a potential threat to stability in the province, and a split emerged in the government between paternalists who favoured intervention to ensure order, and those who opposed state intervention in private property relations. The paternalists emerged victorious and the Punjab Land Alienation Act of 1900 prevented urban commercial castes, who were overwhelmingly Hindu, from permanently acquiring land from statutory agriculturalist tribes, who were mainly Muslim and Sikh. Accompanied by the increasing franchise of the rural population, this interventionist approach led to a long lasting impact on the political landscape of the province. The agricultural lobby remained loyal to the government, and rejected communalism in common defence of its privileges against urban moneylenders. This position was entrenched by the Unionist Party.

The Congress Party's opposition to the Act led to it being marginalised in the Punjab, reducing its influence more so than in any other province, and inhibiting its ability to challenge colonial rule locally. The political dominance of the Unionist Party in Punjab would remain until partition, only collapsing on the eve of independence from Britain when communal violence began to spread in rural Punjab.

==== Army ====
In 1914, three fifths of the Indian army came from Punjab, despite the region constituting approximately one tenth of the total population of British India. During the First World War, Punjabi Sikhs alone accounted for one quarter of all armed personnel in India. Military service provided access to the wider world, and personnel were deployed across the British Empire from Malaya, the Mediterranean, to Africa. Upon completion of their terms of service, these personnel were often amongst the first to seek economic opportunities abroad.

At the outbreak of the Second World War, 48 percent of the Indian army came from the province. In Jhelum, Rawalpindi, and Attock the percentage of the total male population who enlisted reached fifteen percent. Punjab continued to be the main supplier of troops throughout the war, contributing 36 percent of the total Indian troops who served in the conflict.

The huge proportion of Punjabis in the army meant that a significant amount of military expenditure went to Punjabis and in turn resulted in a notably high level of resource investment in Punjab. It has been suggested that by 1935, if remittances of serving officers were combined with income from military pensions, more than two thirds of Punjab's land revenue could have been paid out of military incomes. Military service further helped reduce the extent of indebtedness across the province. In 1920 in Hoshiarpur, a notable source of military personnel, thirty percent of proprietors were debt free compared to the region's average of eleven percent. In addition, the benefits of military service and the perception that the government was benevolent towards soldiers, affected the latter's attitudes towards the British. The loyalty of recruited peasantry and the influence of military groups in rural areas across the province limited the reach of the nationalist movement in the province.

=== Green Revolution period (1947–1991) ===
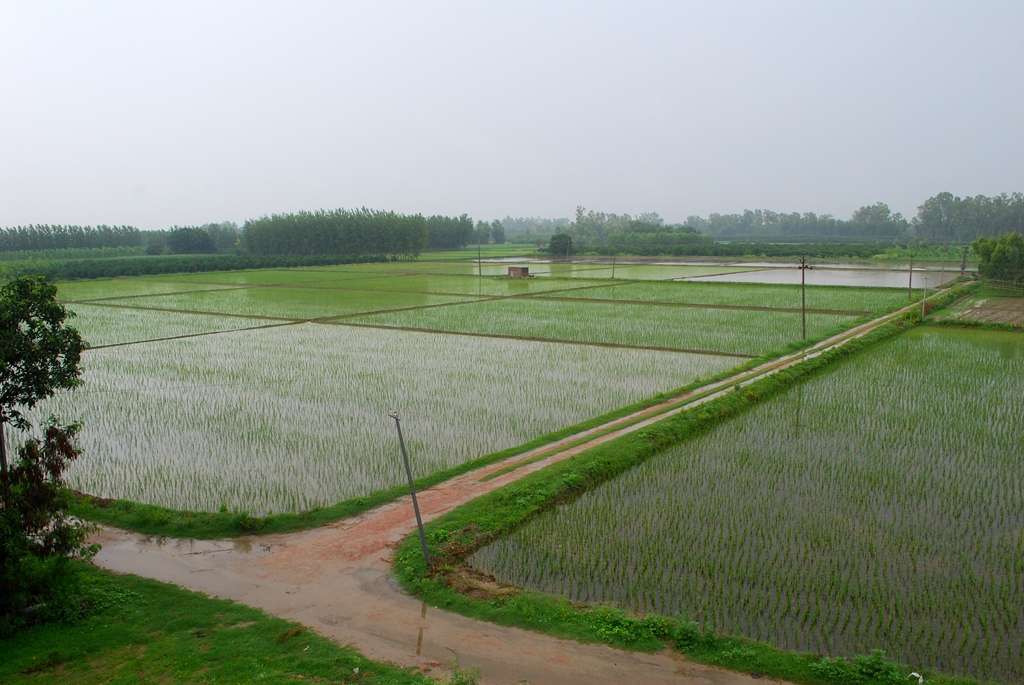
The state of Punjab led India's Green Revolution and earned the distinction of being the country's bread basket.

The Green Revolution in India was first introduced in Punjab in the late 1960s as part of a development program issued by international donor agencies and the Government of India.

Since 1965, the use of high-yielding varieties of seeds, increased fertilisers and improved irrigation facilities collectively contributed to the Green Revolution in India. This improved the condition of agriculture by increasing crop productivity, improving crop patterns and strengthening forward and backward linkages between agriculture and industry. A large amount of the development was focused in Punjab, and greatly improved the states economy, especially in comparison to the rest of India, which saw a low rate of growth. By 1981, Punjab's GDP per capita had become the highest amongst Indian states and union territories.

The Green Revolution yielded great economic prosperity during its early years. In Punjab, where it was first introduced, the Green Revolution led to significant increases in the state's agricultural output, supporting India's overall economy. By 1970, Punjab was producing 70% of the country's total food grains, and farmers' incomes were increasing by over 70%. Punjab's prosperity following the Green Revolution became a model to which other states looked to replicate.

Punjab became the first Indian state to provide electricity to all of its villages in 1974, after the completion of the Guru Nanak Thermal Plant in Bathinda.

==== Criticism ====
===== Costs =====
However, despite the initial prosperity experienced in Punjab, the Green Revolution was met with controversy.

Criticism of the effects of the Green Revolution include the high costs of using High-yielding variety (HYV) seeds for small farmers, which require greater use of irrigation systems and pesticides. Examples of this can be found in Punjab, where farmers bought Monsanto BT cotton seeds. Farmers were sold on the idea that these seeds produced 'natural insecticides', saving costs. In reality, they still needed to pay for expensive pesticides and irrigation systems, which can lead to increased borrowing to finance the change from traditional seed varieties. Many farmers have difficulty in paying for the expensive technologies, especially if they have a bad harvest. These high costs of cultivation push rural farmers to take out loans, typically at high interest rates. Over-borrowing commonly entraps farmers into a cycle of debt.

India's liberalized economy has further exacerbated the farmers's economic conditions. Indian environmentalist Vandana Shiva writes that this is the "second Green Revolution". The first Green Revolution, she suggests, was mostly publicly funded (by the Indian Government). This new Green Revolution, she says, is driven by private and foreign interest—notably Multinational corporations (MNCs) like Monsanto—encouraged by neoliberal policies. Ultimately, this has led to foreign ownership over most of India's farmland, undermining farmers' interests.

Farmer's financial issues have become particularly apparent in Punjab, where its rural areas have witnessed an alarming rise in suicide rates. There was an estimated 51.97% increase in the number of reported suicides in Punjab from 1992–93, compared to the recorded 5.11% increase in the country as a whole. According to a 2019 Indian news report, indebtedness continues to be a grave issue affecting Punjabi people today, demonstrated by the more than 900 farmers recorded to have committed suicide in Punjab in the last two years.

===== Environmental damage =====
Excessive and inappropriate use of fertilizers and pesticides have polluted waterways and killed important insects and wildlife. The increased agricultural production has caused over-use of soil and has rapidly depleted its nutrients. The rampant irrigation practices have led to soil degradation caused by stubble burning. Groundwater practices have fallen dramatically. Further, heavy dependence on a few major crops has led to loss of biodiversity in farming. These problems were aggravated due to absence of training to use modern technology and vast illiteracy, leading to excessive use of chemicals.

===== Increased regional disparities =====
The Green Revolution only spread to irrigated and high-potential, rainfed areas. The regions in villages without the access to sufficient water were left out of the economic prosperity brought by the Green Revolution. This widened the regional disparities between adopters and non-adopters. Since the HYV seeds can only be used in lands with a reliable water supply and requires chemicals, fertilizers etc., the introduction of the new technology in the dry-land areas is ruled out.

===== Communal tensions =====
While the Green Revolution in Punjab had several positive and negative impacts, the introduction of new mechanised agricultural techniques led to an uneven distribution of wealth. Industrial development was not done at the same pace of agricultural development and the Indian government had been reluctant to set up heavy industries in Punjab due to its status as a high-risk state bordering Pakistan. The rapid increase in higher education opportunities without an adequate corresponding rise in the jobs resulted in an increase in unemployment for educated youth. The resulting unemployed rural Sikh youth were drawn to militant groups, and formed the backbone of the militancy that occurred in Punjab during the 1980s.

=== Economic liberalisation period (post-1991) ===
Economic liberalisation in India propelled India to become one of the fastest growing major economies in the world. However, Punjab has grown slower than the rest of India, and thus its GDP per capita rank has dropped from first amongst Indian states and union territories in 1981 to sixteenth in 2020.

Some argue that part of the slower growth might have been caused by high rates of corruption in the state government and mistreatment of the state by the central government. Low rates of investment and high rates of debt, some of the problems caused by the Green Revolution, have helped keep growth lower in the state than elsewhere in India.

The slower growth of Punjab's economy, particularlywithin the agricultural sector, is believed to have helped fuel the 2020–2021 Indian farmers' protest.

The economy of Punjab was severely effected by the COVID-19 pandemic beginning in 2020.

== Macroeconomic trend ==
The state government agency in charge of collecting macroeconomic statistics is the Economic and Statistical Organisation of Punjab (ESO).

According to the 2008 Global Hunger Index, Punjab had the lowest level of hunger in India, with less than one-fourth of children below the age of five being underweight. The state also had one of the lowest poverty rates in India at 8 percent in 2012. Punjab had seen strong economic growth in the past, but since 2005 the state's growth has fallen below the national average.

Punjab's debt was estimated to be 39.8% of the state's GDP in 2020, down from 62% in 2005.

The following chart shows the trends in Punjab's gross state domestic product at market prices, as estimated by the Ministry of Statistics and Programme Implementation.

Year	Gross State Domestic Product (Indian Rupee / Ten Million / Crores)
1980	50,250
1985	95,060
1990	188,830
1995	386,150
2000	660,100
2005	925,380
2011	2,213,320

== Agriculture ==
Crop-wise percentage share of total planted area in Punjab

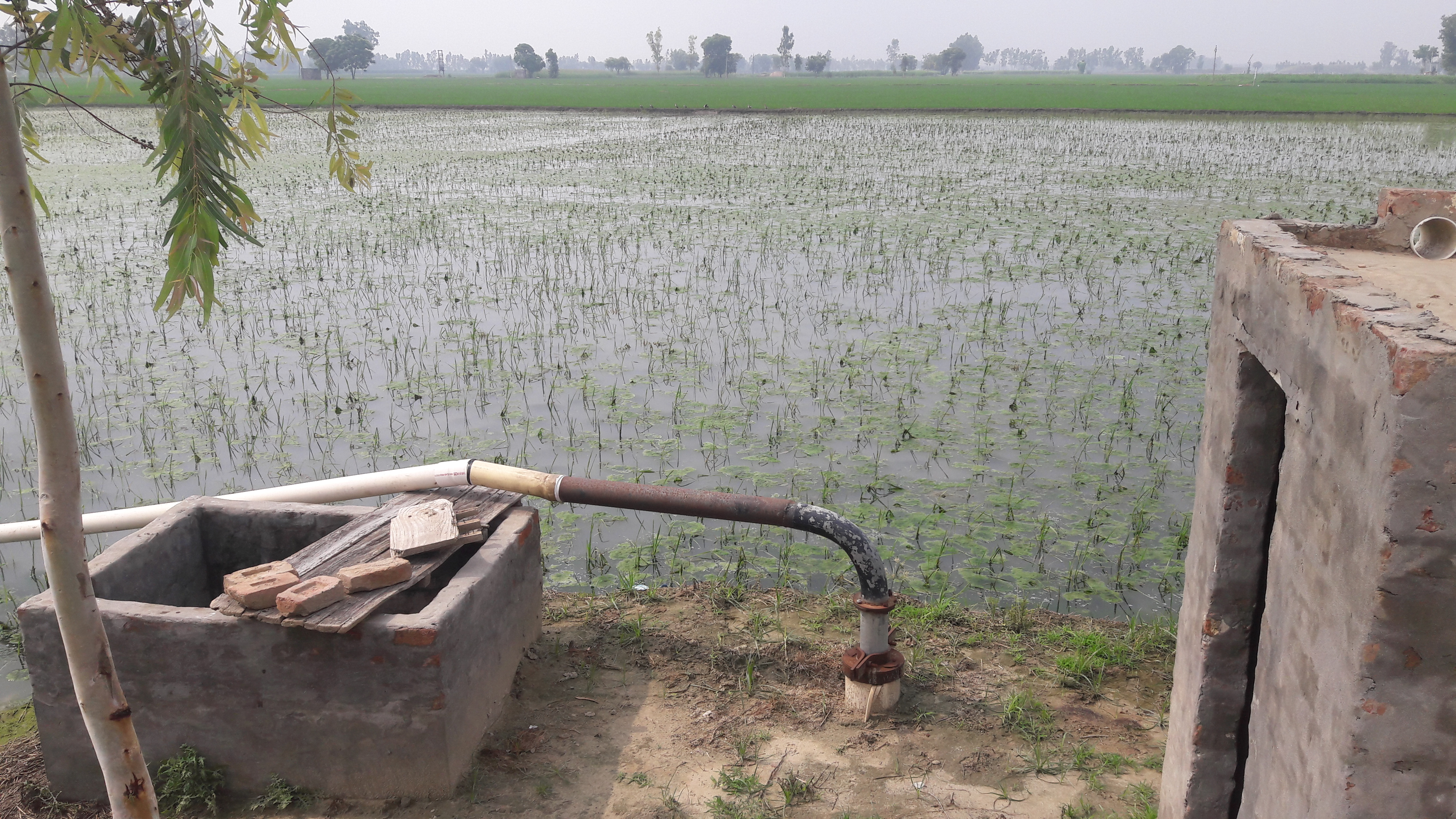
A Punjabi khet or farm

Punjab's economy has been primarily agriculture-based since the Green Revolution due to the presence of abundant water sources and fertile soils; most of the state lies in a fertile alluvial plain with many rivers and an extensive irrigation canal system, making it ideal for growing grains, fruits, and vegetables. Despite covering only 1.53% of its geographical area, Punjab makes up about 17% of India's wheat production (the second highest amongst Indian states and union territories after Uttar Pradesh, the latter producing more than 30% of the nation's supply), around 12% of its rice production, and around 5% of its milk production, being known as India's breadbasket. Punjab was awarded the National Productivity Award for agriculture extension services from the years 1991–92, 1998–99, 2001, and 2003–04. However, recently the state's agricultural productivity has declined due to increasingly poor soil fertility attributed to pesticides, fertilisers, and a declining water table.

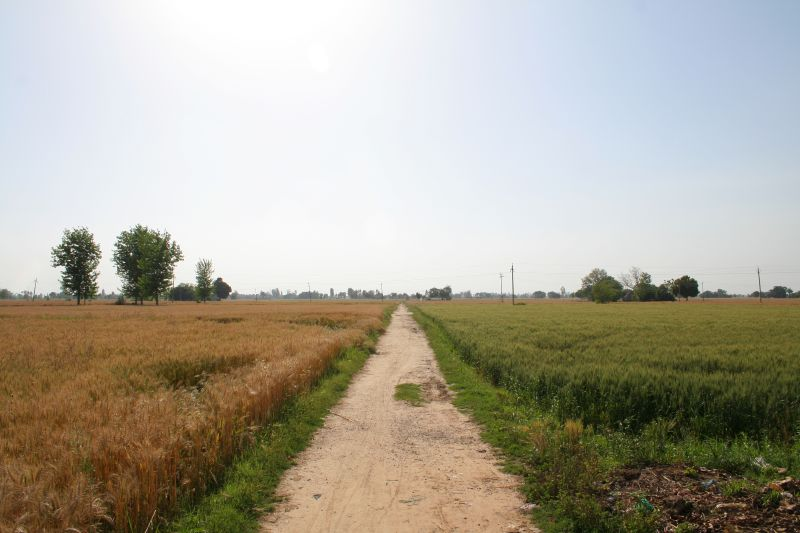
Wheat-fields in Phagwara, Punjab, India

The percentage of the GDP produced by the agricultural sector was 25% in 2018–19. The growth rate of the agricultural sector was only 2.3% in 2018–19, compared to 6.0% for the state's economy as a whole.

About 80% to 95% of Punjab's agricultural land is owned by its Jat Sikh community despite it only forming 21% of the state's population. About 10% of Punjab's population is made up of migrants from poorer states to the southeast such as Uttar Pradesh and Bihar who work as farm laborers.

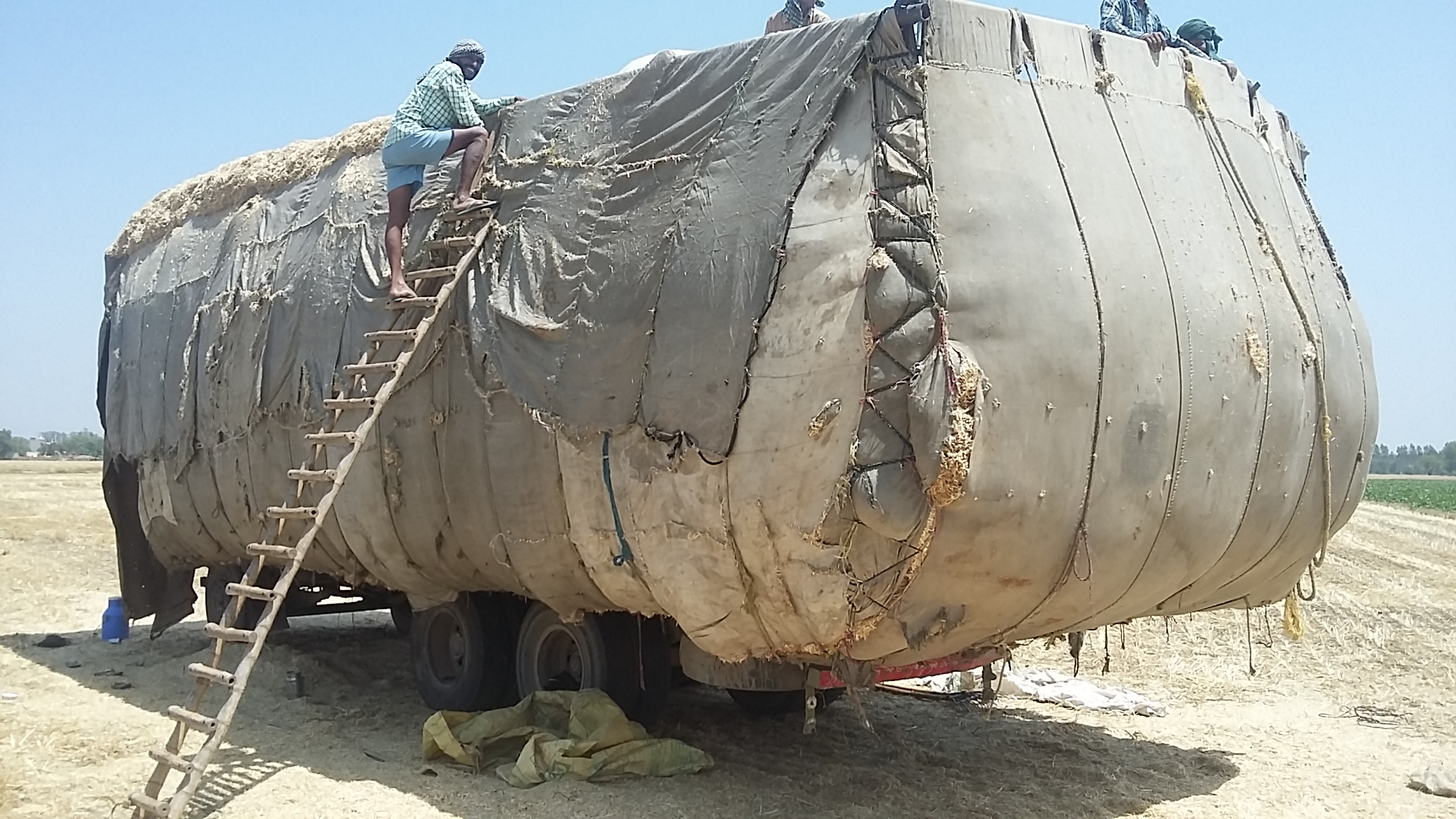
Truck overloaded with straw in Punjab, India

The most grown crop is wheat. Other important crops are rice, cotton, sugarcane, pearl millet, finger millet, sorghum, maize, barley and fruits. Among the fodder crops are bajra and jowar. In the category of fruits, it produces abundant stock of kinnow. The main sources of irrigation are canals and tube wells.

Harvest

The rabi or the spring harvest consists of wheat, gram, barley, potatoes, and winter vegetables. The kharif or the autumn harvest consists of rice, maize, sugarcane, cotton and pulses.

=== Pollution ===
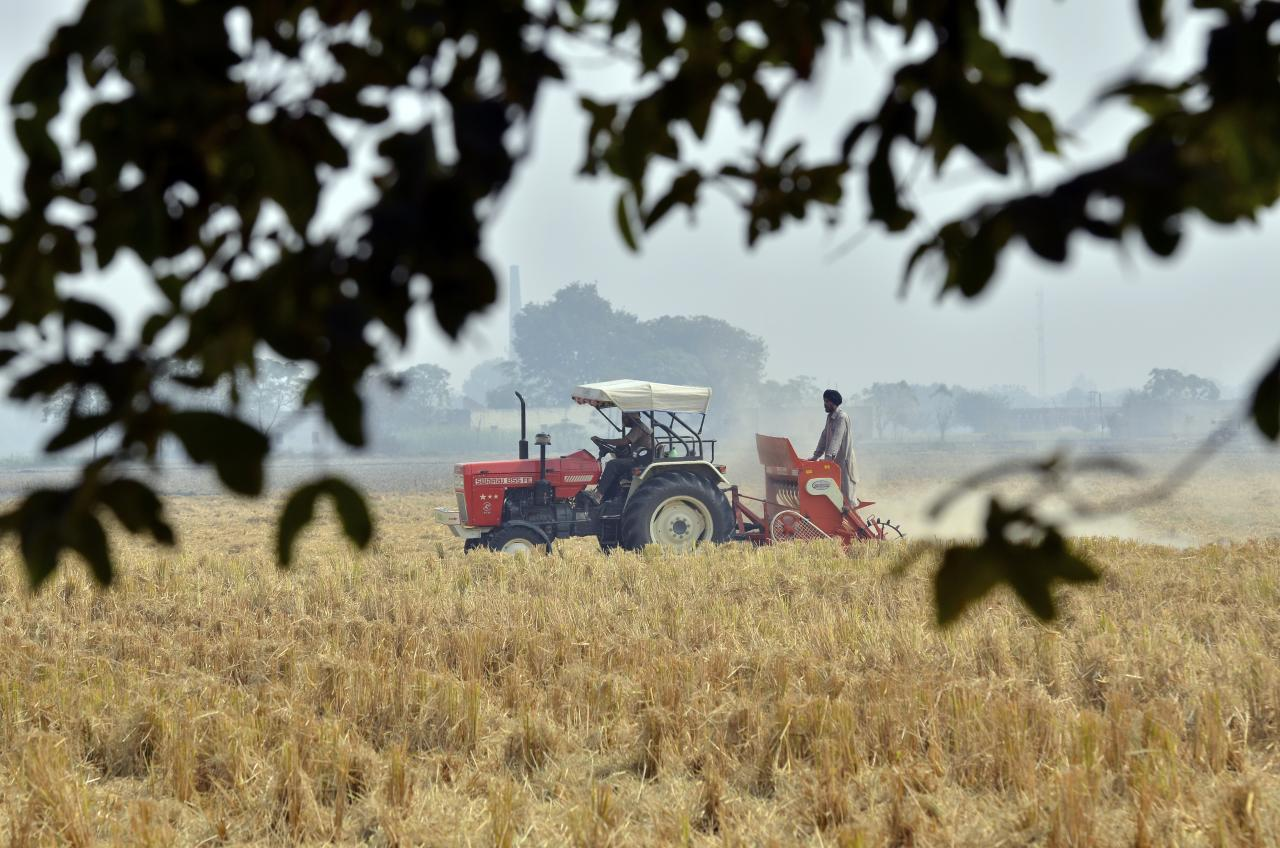
Agriculture in India tractor farming Punjab preparing field for a wheat crop without burning previous crop stalk

Rice and wheat are doublecropped in Punjab, with rice stalks being burned off of millions of acres prior to the planting of wheat. This widespread practice is polluting and wasteful.

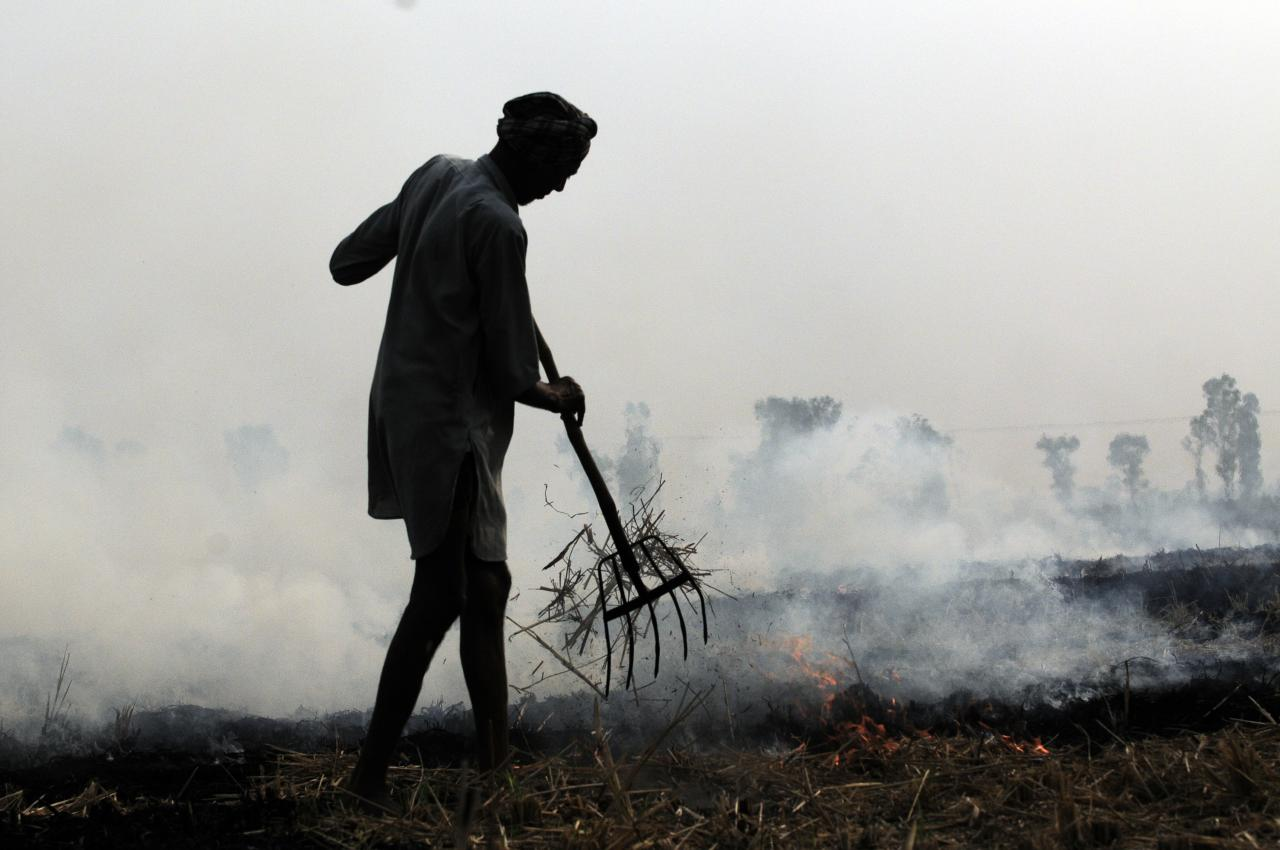
Burning of rice residues after harvest, to quickly prepare the land for wheat planting, around Sangrur, SE Punjab, India.

In Punjab, the consumption of fertiliser per hectare is 223.46 kilograms (492.6 lb) as compared to 90 kilograms (200 lb) nationally. In recent years, a drop in productivity has been observed, mainly due to falling soil fertility. This is believed to be due to excessive use of fertilisers and pesticides over years. Another worry is the rapidly falling water table on which almost 90% of the agricultural land depends; alarming drops have been witnessed in recent years. By some estimates, groundwater is falling by 1 metre (3 ft 3 in) or more per year.

=== Issues ===
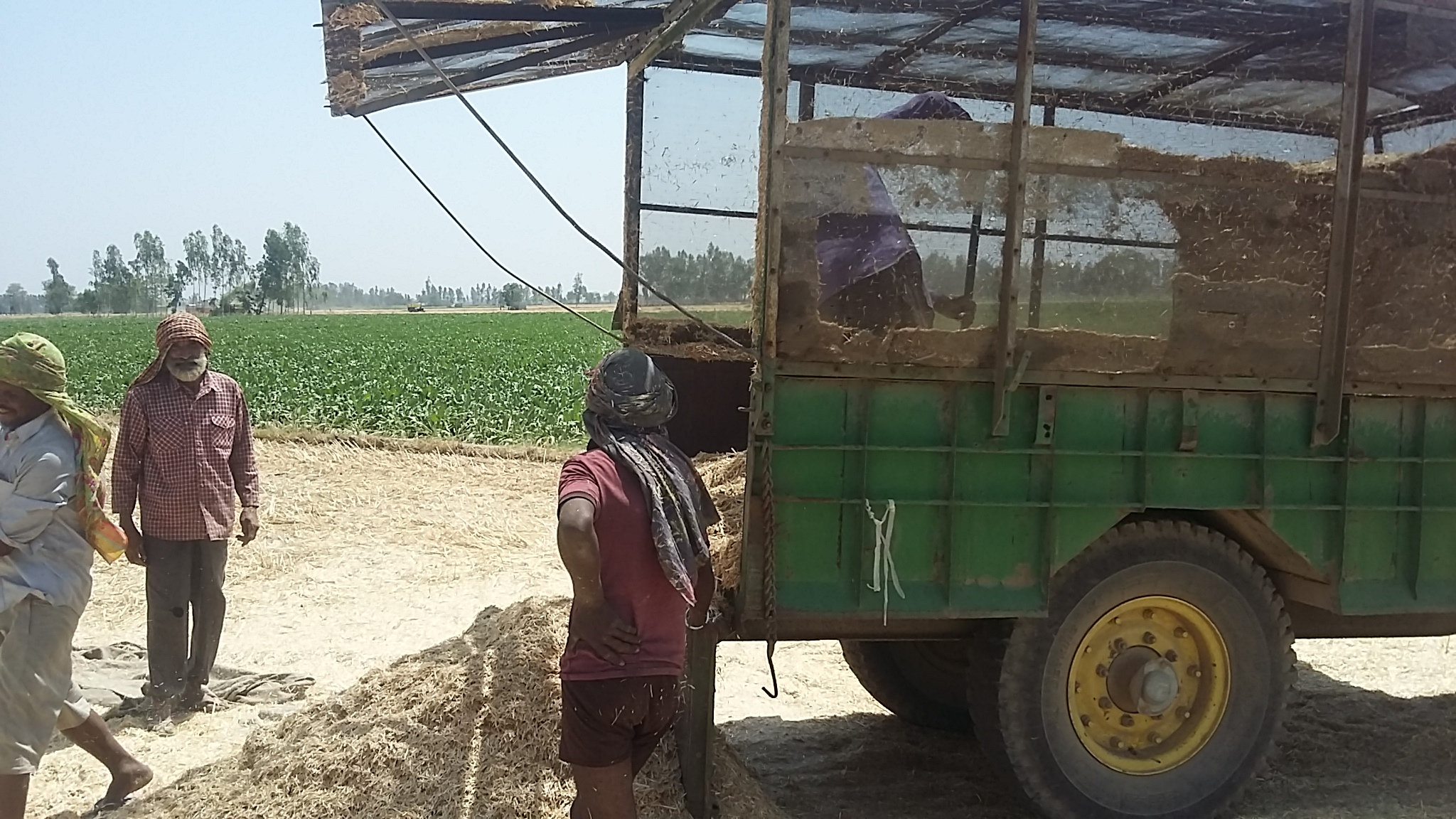
Workers preparing paddy-straw in Punjab, India

Issues include paddy-wheat monoculture, lack of diversification, and warnings of desertification.

== Industry ==
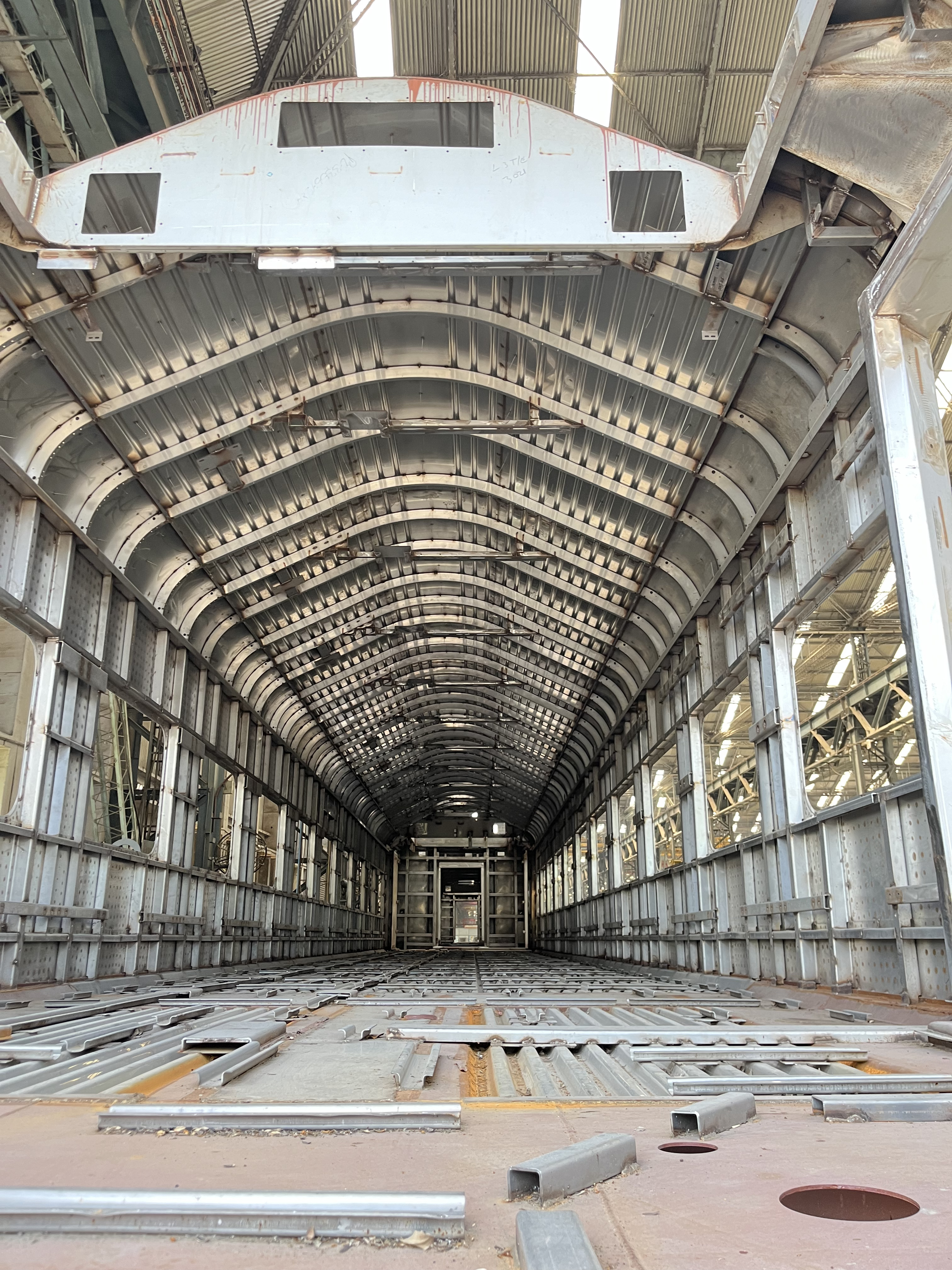
Train coach factory in Kapurthala, Punjab, India

The percentage of the GDP produced by the manufacturing sector was 25% in 2018–19. The growth rate of the manufacturing sector was 5.8% in 2018–19, compared to 6.0% for the state's economy as a whole. A prominent feature of Punjab's industrial landscape are its small sized industrial units. There are nearly 194,000 small scale industrial units in the state in addition to 586 large and medium units. Ludhiana is an important center for industry.

Other major industries include the manufacturing of scientific instruments, agricultural goods, electrical goods, machine tools, textiles, sewing machines, sports goods, starch, fertilisers, bicycles, garments, and the processing of pine oil and sugar. Minerals and energy resources also contribute to Punjab's economy to a much lesser extent. Punjab has the largest number of steel rolling mill plants in India, which are in the "Steel Town" of Mandi Gobindgarh in the Fatehgarh Sahib district.

The industrial units in the state are broadly divided into three important sectors: agro-based industrial units, machinery units, and chemical units.

As of 2017, there were 8 registered factories that manufactured machinery and other equipments in Punjab who employed 48 workers.

The table below shows the number of registered working factories and workers employed by selected manufacturing industries in Punjab as of 2017.

Number of registered working factories and workers employed by selected manufacturing industries in Punjab in 2017
Industry	Factories	Workers
Basic metals	14	305
Machinery and other equipments	8	48
Electrical equipment	2	16
Computers, Electronics and Optical products	85	6,231
Chemicals and chemical products	21	241
Transport equipment	12	322
Furniture	7	45
Paper and paper products	8	132
Non-metallic mineral products	160	1,772
Beverages	167	1,373
Food products and Beverages products	193	2,932

=== Textile ===
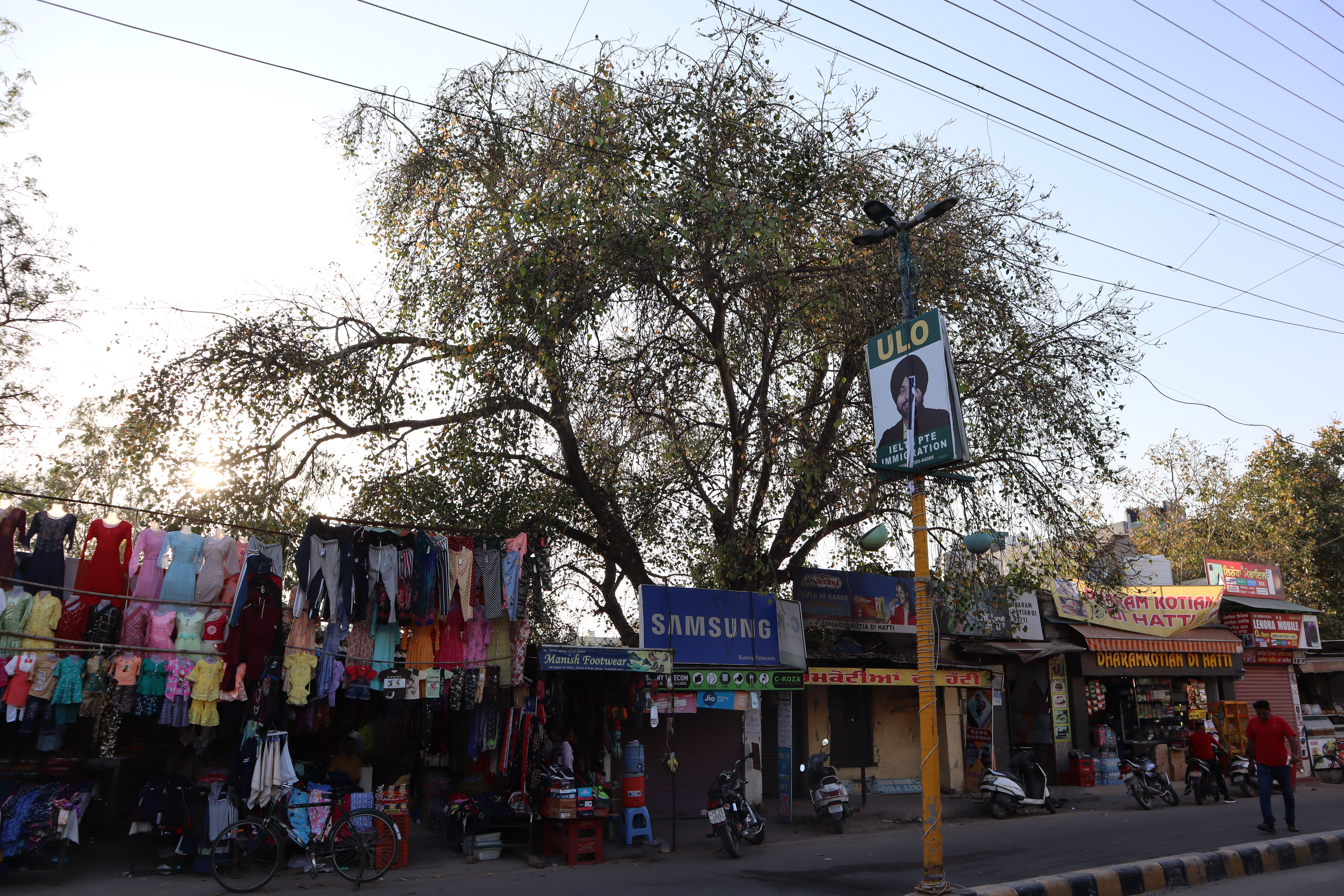
Clothing being sold in a bazaar in Moga, Punjab, India

The state produces nearly 25% of the best quality cotton in India. Despite having several advantages, there is one major disadvantage to textile production in Punjab; the total spindlage capacity of the state is only 1.5% of the country's. Ludhiana is known as a major manchester producer of India. Batala was once called the "Iron bird of Asia", as it produced the highest amount of cast iron casting, agricultural, and mechanical machinery. Batala is still one of the leading cities in Northern India in manufacturing of cast iron casting and mechanical machinery. Cotton ginning, weaving, sugar refining and rice milling are some of the other important industries of the region.

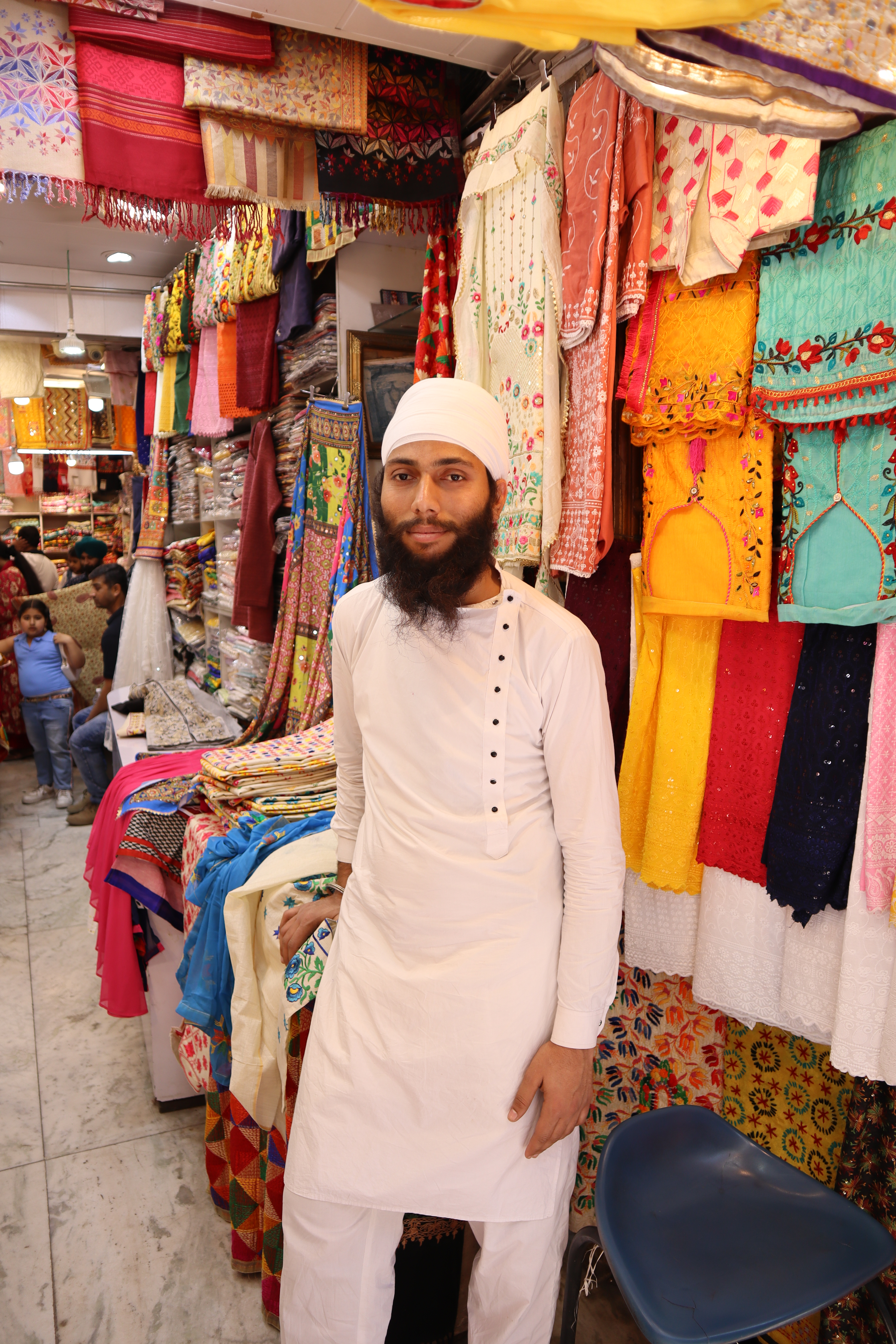
Clothing store in Amritsar, Punjab, India

Most of the cotton mills are located in Abohar, Malout, Phagwara, Amritsar, Kharar, Mohali and Ludhiana. Malerkotla, Abohar, Malout, and Bhatinda are important for cotton ginning and press nearly 25.3 million (25,300,000) bales of cotton combined. About 97 million kilograms of yarn and 36.5 million metres of cloth were produced in Punjab's cotton textile mills. But, only 43% of the cotton yarn formed in Punjab is used within the state, with the remaining sold outside the state. Pesticides introduced during the Green Revolution played an important part in the bustling cotton industry. The most common biopesticides in Punjab are Bacillus thuringiensis (Bt). With the introduction of Bt, the total cotton farming area in Punjab increased from 449,000 hectares in 2002 to 560,000 hectares in 2005. During this time frame, production of cotton increased from 1.08 million bales (170 kg each) to 2.2 million bales, making up about 11–12% of the country's total production of cotton.

Overall textile production of Punjab is predictable at 105000 Million Indian Rupee, with 32500 Million Indian Rupee of knitwear, shawls, made-ups (bed sheets, pillow cases, duvet covers, and curtains) and yarns sold abroad. The number of direct and indirect employees of the textile industry in Punjab is around 2 Million people.

=== Steel ===
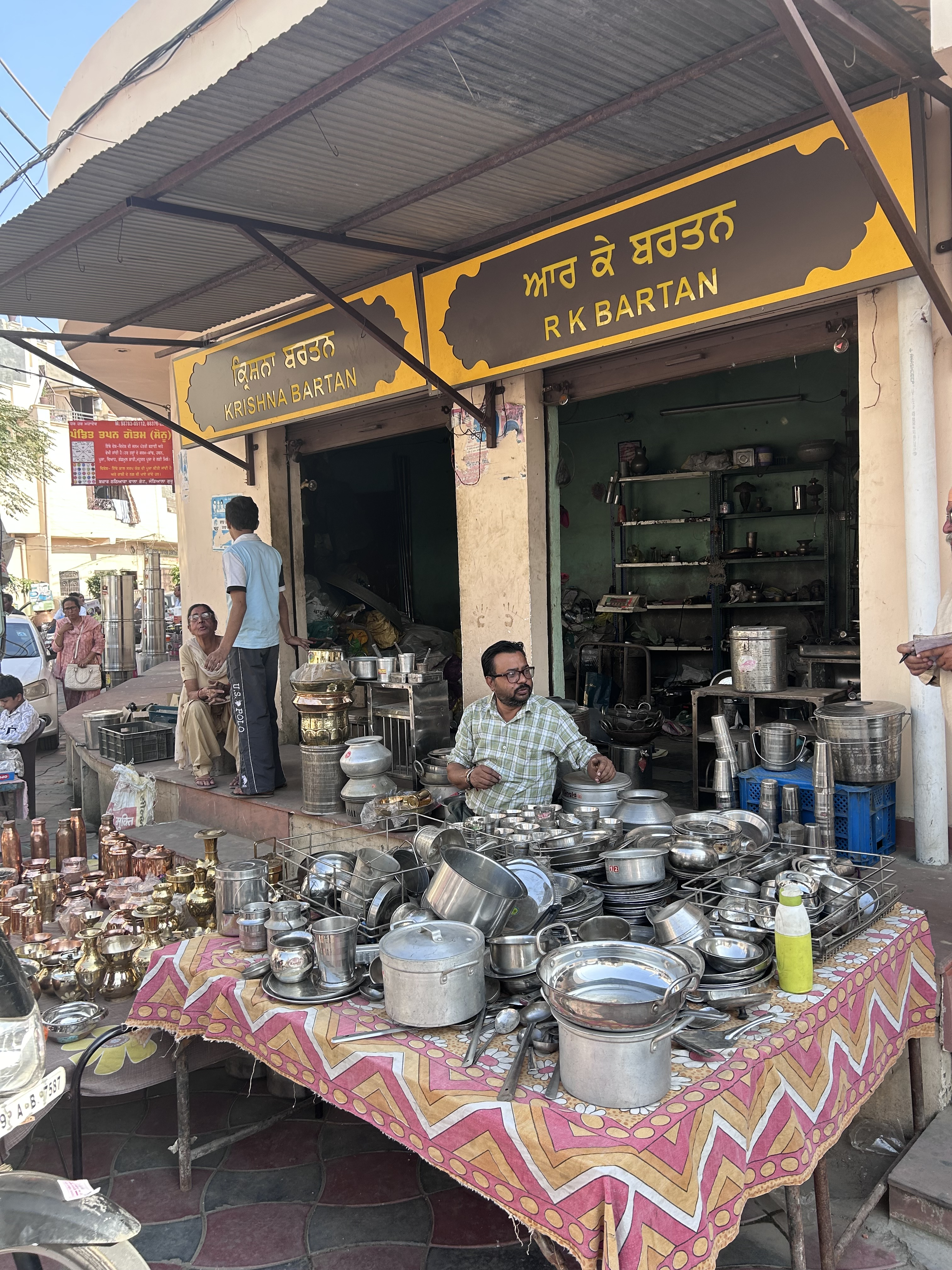
Thathera shop

In 2014–15, the steel used in Punjab was about 2000 million tonnes (Mt). This was 13th highest among the Indian states. As of March 2019, the production of moulded steel in Mandi Gobindgarh was 3 lakh tonnes per month. The number of functional furnaces in the city were 95 and rolling mills were 250.

=== Sugar ===
Suger Mill, Morinda

The sugar mills in Punjab are located in Batala, Gurdaspur, Bhogpur, Phagwara, Nawanshahar, Zira, Morinda, Rakhra, Dhuri, Fazilka, Nakodar, Dasua, Budhewal, Budhladha, Mukerian, Tarn Taran, Ajnala, Faridkot, Jagraon, Amloh, Patran, and Lauhka.

One of the more salient feature of the sugar industry in Punjab is that out of the 22 mills, 15 are in the co-operative sector and 7 are privately owned. Compared to the state of Uttar Pradesh, the size of the sugar mills in Punjab is small. The co-operative sugar mill in Morinda is the biggest in the state with a daily crushing capacity of 4,000 tonnes of sugarcane. Six of the cooperative sugar mills are inoperative while the remaining nine crush cane during the season.

=== Dairy ===
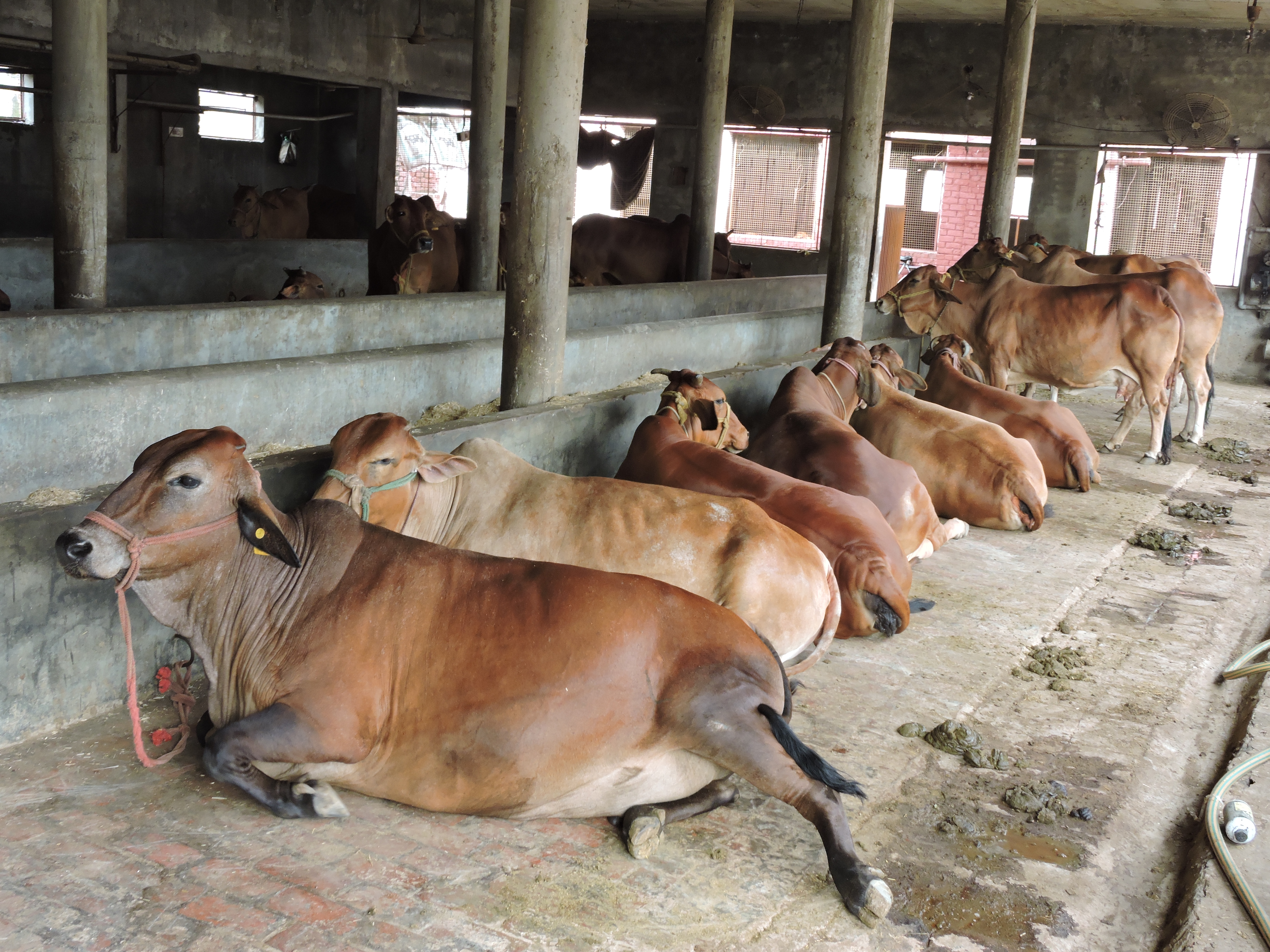
Sahiwal-breed cows at a dairy unit attached to Bhai Ram Singh Memorial Place, Bhaini Sahib, Ludhyana district, Punjab, India

The primary source of milk and other dairy products in the statecomes from buffalo. The state ranks at the top in the country in the availability of milk after Haryana and Gujarat.

The milk plants are mainly located in Verka Town (Amristar district), Ludhiana, Mohali, Jalandhar, Patiala, Hoshiarpur, Gurdaspur, Ferozepur, Sangrur, Bhatinda, Faridkot, Nabha, Moga, Kot Kapura, and Hamira. The plant in Moga is the biggest plant in the state with a processing capacity of nearly 435 thousand litres.

The first Amul milk plant in the Punjab state was opened in 2015 in Batala.

== Services ==
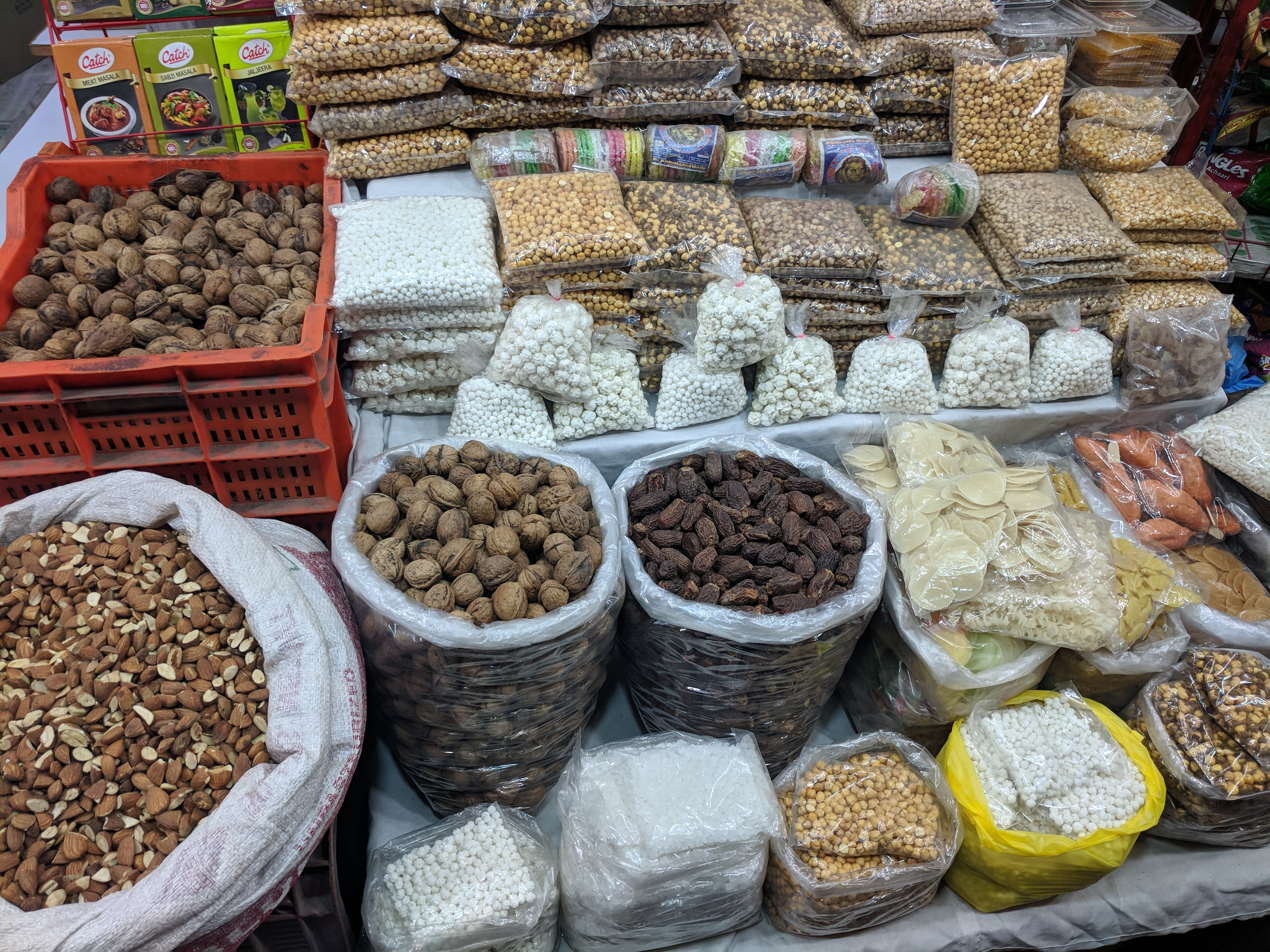
Food supplies and ingredients being sold in Amritsar

In 2018-19, the percentage of Punjab's GDP produced by the services sector was 50%. The growth rate of the services sector was 7.1% in 2018–19, compared to 6.0% for the state's economy as a whole.

The state's bustling tourism, music, culinary, and film industries contribute to the state's economy, and are amongst the largest in India despite the state's small size and population. This includes India's largest music industry. Punjab also has a large diaspora of about 3 million that has primarily settled in the United Kingdom, United States, and Canada which sends back billions in USD in remittances to the state, playing a major role in its economy.

=== Remittances ===
In 2012, Punjab was one of the highest receivers of overall remittances to India which stood at $66.13 billion, behind Kerala and Tamil Nadu.

=== Tourism ===
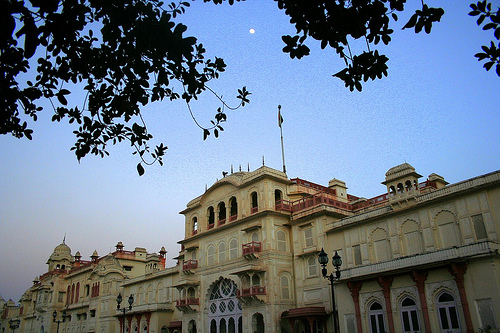
Moti Bagh Palace in Patiala

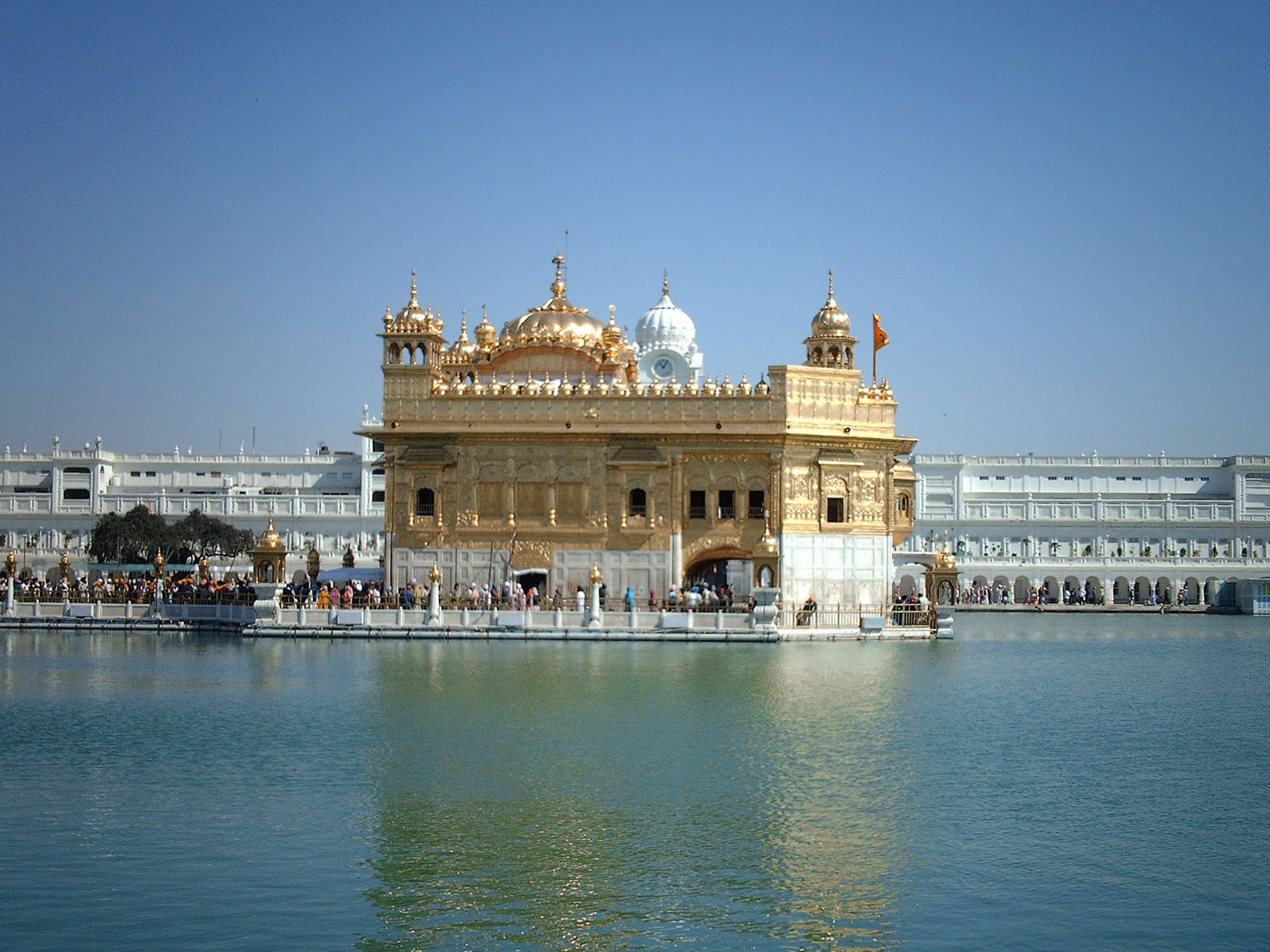
Golden Temple in Amritsar is a major tourist destination in Punjab

Tourism in Punjab centres around historic palaces, battle sites, and Sikh architecture of the region. Popular attractions include various sites of the Indus Valley Civilisation, the ancient fort of Bathinda, the architectural monuments of Kapurthala, Patiala, and the modern capital of Chandigarh designed by Le Corbusier. Punjab also has the world's first museum based on the Indian Partition of 1947, in Amritsar, called the Partition Museum.

The Golden Temple (Harmandir Sahib) of Amritsar is one of the biggest tourist destinations in Punjab and India as a whole, attracting more visitors than the Taj Mahal. Lonely Planet Bluelist 2008 voted the Harmandir Sahib as one of the world's best spiritual sites. There is a rapidly expanding array of international hotels in Amritsar, considered a holy city, at the Heritage Walk Amritsar that can be booked for overnight stays.

Devi Talab Mandir is a Hindu temple located in Jalandhar. This temple is devoted to goddess Durga and is believed to be at least 200 years old.

Another main tourist destination is the religious and historic city of Sri Anandpur Sahib where large number of tourists come to see the Virasat-e-Khalsa (Khalsa Heritage Memorial Complex) and take part in Hola Mohalla festival.

Qila Raipur Sports Festival is also popular tourist attraction in Qila Raipur near Ludhiana. Shahpur kandi fort, Ranjit Sagar lake and Sikh Temple in Sri Muktsar Sahib are other popular attractions in Punjab.

Fatehgarh Sahib is a town and a sacred pilgrimage site in Sikhism located in Punjab. It is the headquarters of the Fatehgarh Sahib district, located about 5 kilometres (3.1 mi) north of Sirhind. Fatehgarh Sahib is named after Fateh Singh, the 6-year-old son of Guru Gobind Singh, who was seized and buried alive, along with his 9-year-old brother Zoravar Singh, by the Mughals under the orders of governor Wazir Khan during the Mughal-Sikh wars of the early 18th century. The town experienced major historical events after the martyrdom of the sons in 1705, with frequent changes in control between the Sikhs and Mughals. Every year, nearly 1 million devotees come and pay their homage at the Fatehgarh Sahib gurudwara.

=== Banking ===
All major banks that are licensed by RBI operate in Punjab with their branches in every nook and corner of state. Some Punjab-based banks are state owned co-operative bank The Punjab State Co-operative Bank Limited with its headquarters in Chandigarh, a RRB named Punjab Gramin Bank with its headquarters in Kapurthala and a private bank Capital Small Finance Bank with its headquarters in Jalandhar.

== Transportation and infrastructure ==
Punjab has relatively well-developed infrastructure, including road, rail, air, and river transport links that are extensive throughout the region. Its transport system is rated one of the best in the country with a ranking of 210 points compared to the national average of 100 in the National Council Applied Economic Research's (NCAER) infrastructure index. It has highest per capita generation of electricity in India, at 2.5 times the national average. All of Punjab's villages have been electrified and connected to the state electrical power grid since 1974.

=== Road ===
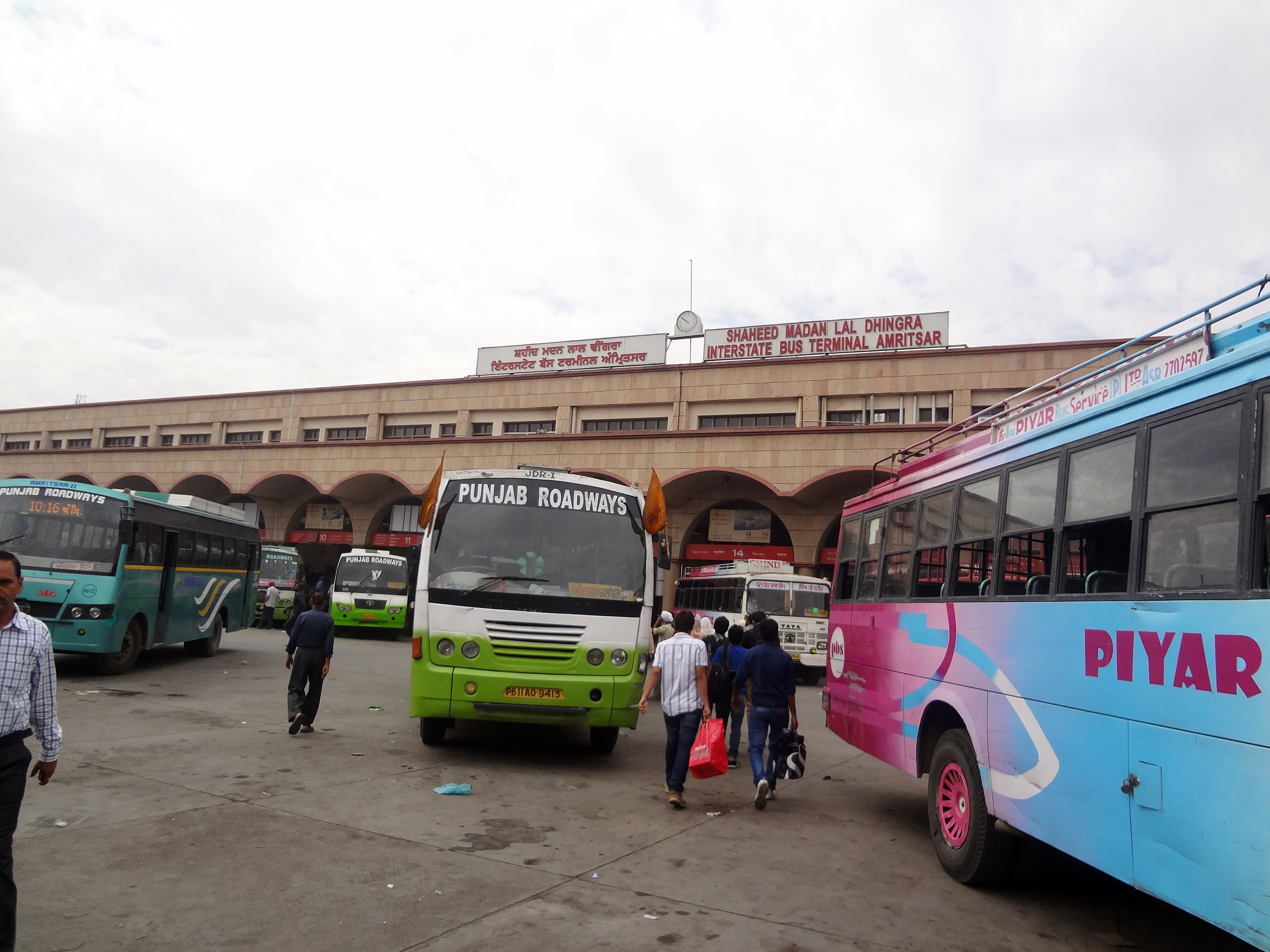
Amritsar Inter State Bus Stand

All the cities and towns of Punjab are connected by four-lane national highways. The Grand Trunk Road, also known as "NH1", connects Kolkata to Peshawar, passing through Amritsar and Jalandhar. National highways passing through the state are ranked the best in the country with widespread road networks that serve isolated towns as well as the border region. Amritsar and Ludhiana are among several Indian cities that have the highest accident rates in India. 97% of villages are connected by metalled roads.

The following expressways pass through Punjab:

- Delhi–Amritsar–Katra Expressway from Delhi to Amritsar and Katra
- Amritsar–Jamnagar Expressway from Amritsar to Jamnagar
- Pathankot–Ajmer Expressway from Pathankot to Ajmer

The following national highways connect major towns, cities and villages:

- National Highway 1
- National Highway 10
- National Highway 15
- National Highway 1A
- National Highway 54
- National Highway 20
- National Highway 21
- National Highway 22
- National Highway 64
- National Highway 70
- National Highway 71
- National Highway 95

==== Lengths ====
- Total road network 47,605 kilometres (29,580 mi)
- National highways: 1,000 kilometres (620 mi)
- State highways: 2,166 kilometres (1,346 mi)
- Major district roads: 1,799 kilometres (1,118 mi)
- Other district roads: 3,440 kilometres (2,140 mi)
- Link roads: 31,657 kilometres (19,671 mi)

Source: NCAER & Punjab Government.

=== Bus ===
There are also a bus rapid transit system Amritsar BRTS in the holy city of Amritsar, popularly known as 'Amritsar MetroBus'

==== Air ====
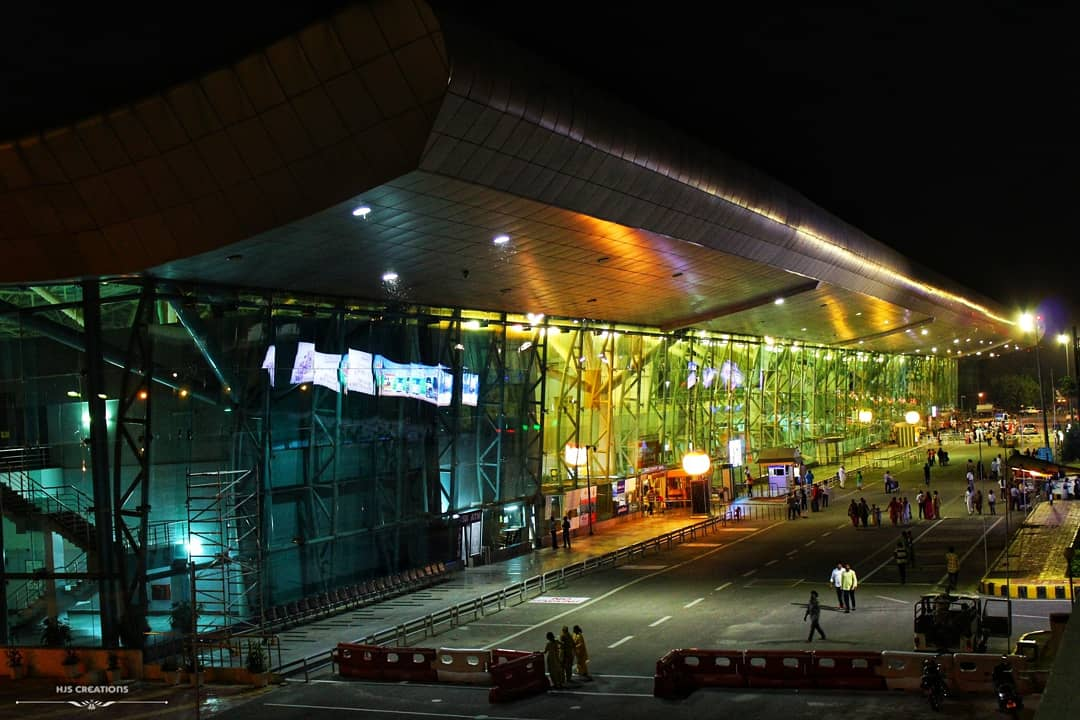
Sri Guru Ram Dass Jee International Airport in Amritsar

Punjab has six civil airports including two international airports: Amritsar International Airport and Chandigarh International Airport; and four domestic airports: Bathinda Airport, Pathankot Airport, Adampur Airport (Jalandhar) and Sahnewal Airport (Ludhiana). Apart from these 6 airports, there are 2 airfields at Beas (Amritsar) and Patiala which do not serve any commercial flight operations.

Sri Guru Ram Dass Jee International Airport in Amritsar, is a primary airport hub and gateway into Punjab, as the airport directly serves key cities around the world, including London, Singapore, Moscow, Dubai, Birmingham among others.

=== Rail ===
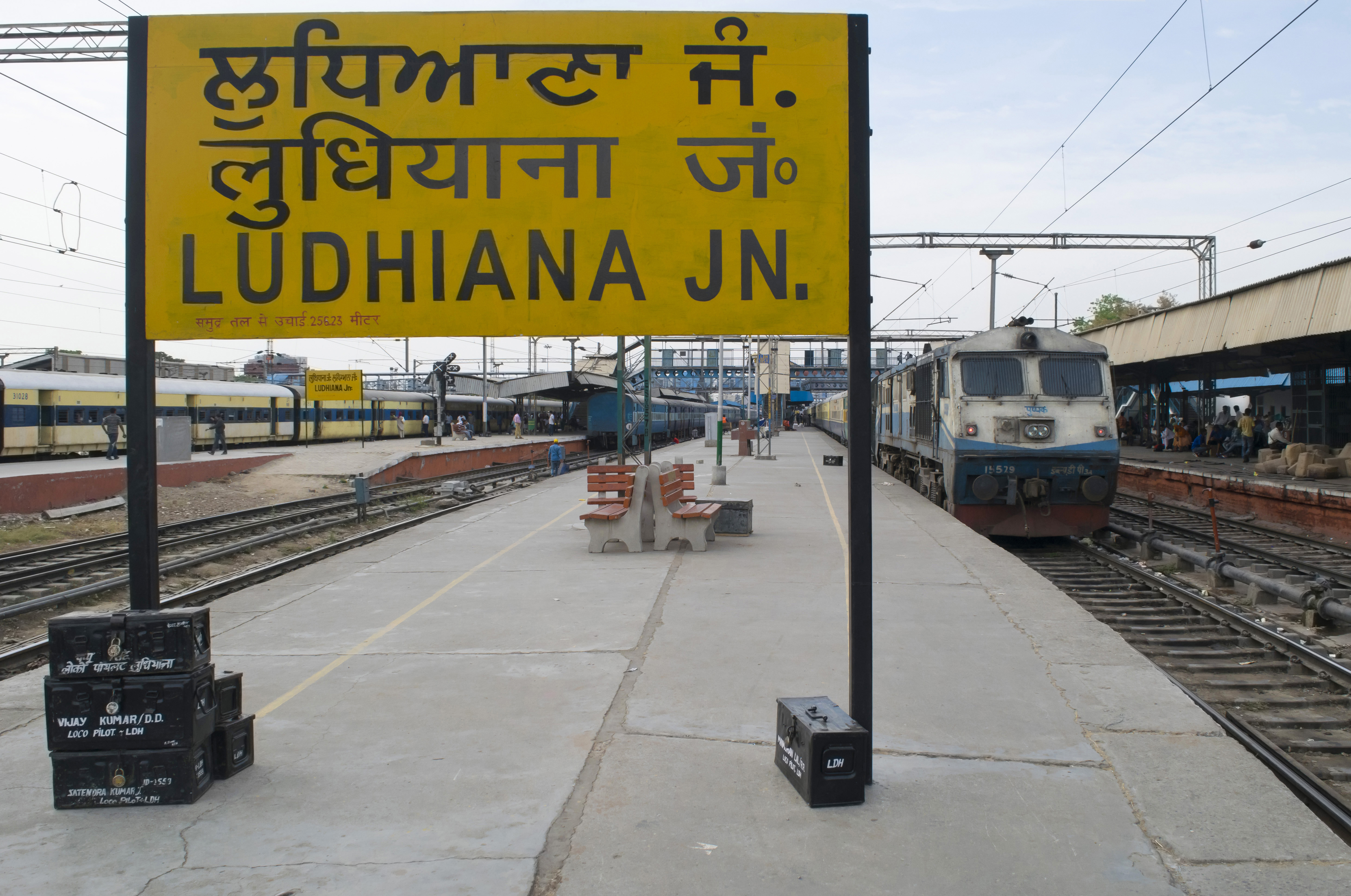
View of Ludhiana railway station

The Indian Railways' Northern Railway line runs through the state, connecting most of the major towns and cities. The Shatabdi Express, India's fastest series of train connects Amritsar to New Delhi, covering total distance of 449 kilometres (279 mi). Amritsar Junction railway station is the busiest junction of the state. Bathinda Junction holds the record of maximum railway lines from a railway junction in Asia.

Punjab's major railway stations are Amritsar Junction (ASR), Ludhiana Junction (LDH), Jalandhar Cantonment (JRC), Firozpur Cantonment (FZR), Jalandhar City Junction (JUC), Pathankot Junction (PTK) and Patiala railway station (PTA). The railway stations of Amritsar are included in the Indian Railway's list of 50 world-class railway stations.

=== Power ===
The majority of the state's energy is provided by Punjab State Power Corporation (PSPCL) owned hydropower and thermal plants. These plants include:

- Guru Gobind Singh Super Thermal Plant in Ropar (1260 megawatts)
- Guru Hargobind Thermal Plant in Lehra Mohabbat, which also has its own hydropower plants (920 megawatts)
- Shanan Power House near Jogindernagar, Himachal Pradesh (10 megawatts)
- Ranjit Sagar Dam and the Shahpurkandi dam project (600 megawatts)
- Upper Bari Doab Canal System (UBDC) power houses (91.35 megawatts)
- Mukerian Hydel Project (207 megawatts)
- Anand Pur Sahib Hydel Channel (134 megawatts)
- Mini and Micro hydropower plants on the Sirhind Canal.

In addition to PSPCL owned plants, Punjab gets a share of the energy generated by the Yhdro Power Plants under the control of the Bhakra Beas Management Board (BBMB). The Yhdro Power Plants include:

- Bhakra Dam, left and right Bank Power Houses (1325 megawatts)
- Hydro Power Plants on Bhakra Main Line in Ganguwal and Kotla (155 megawatts)
- Hydro Power Plant in Pong (396 megawatts)
- Power Plant in Dehar (990megawatts)

A new thermal plant in Rajpura with a 1400 megawatt power capacity was inaugurated on 8 December 2013. Another Thermal Plant in Bathinda with a 1980 megawatt capacity is in development.

==== Common pool projects ====
The common pool projects of Punjab are the Bhakra Nangal Complex, the Dehar Power Plant, and the Pong Power Plant. Punjab shares about 51% of the Power generated from the Bhakra Nangal Complex and 48% from the Power generated at the Pong Project.

- Bhakra Nangal Complex
- The Upper Bari Doab Canal System (UBDC)
- The Shanah Power House

==== Thermal electricity ====
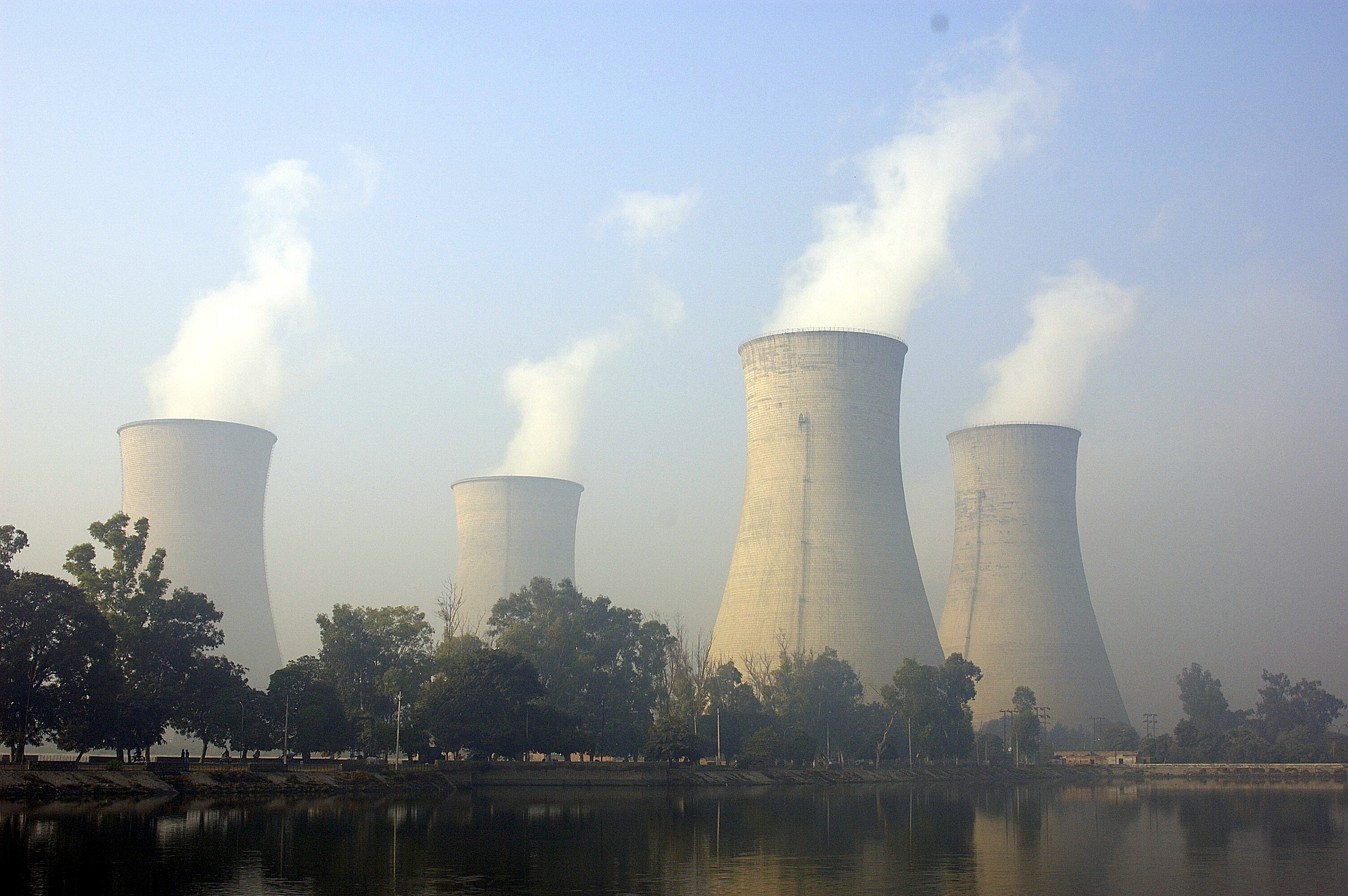
Power plant in Bathinda, Punjab, India

There are a number of thermal power plants in the state:

- Guru Nanak Dev Thermal Plant, Bathinda was completed in 1974. The Guru Nanak Thermal plant had four units of 110 megawatts capacity each but was shut down in 2018.
- Ropar thermal power plant consists of 4 units capable of generating 210 megawatts each. Two units of the plant were shut down in 2018. The plant is spread over an area of about 2,500 acres (1,000 ha) on the banks of the Sutlej river.
- A 1980 megawatts thermal plant is under development in Talwandi Sabo, Mansa district by Sterlite Industries.
- Goindwal Sahib Power Plant in Goindwal Sahib, Amritsar district by GVK Power (540 megawatts)
- A 2640 megawatts thermal plant in Gidderbaha and a 2100 megawatts thermal plant in Rajpura are in development.
- A number of bio-mass and Agro-Waste based power plants are under construction by private companies in collaboration with Punjab Energy Development Agency (PEDA) based on renewable energy.

=== Education ===
The National Institute of Pharmaceutical Education and Research

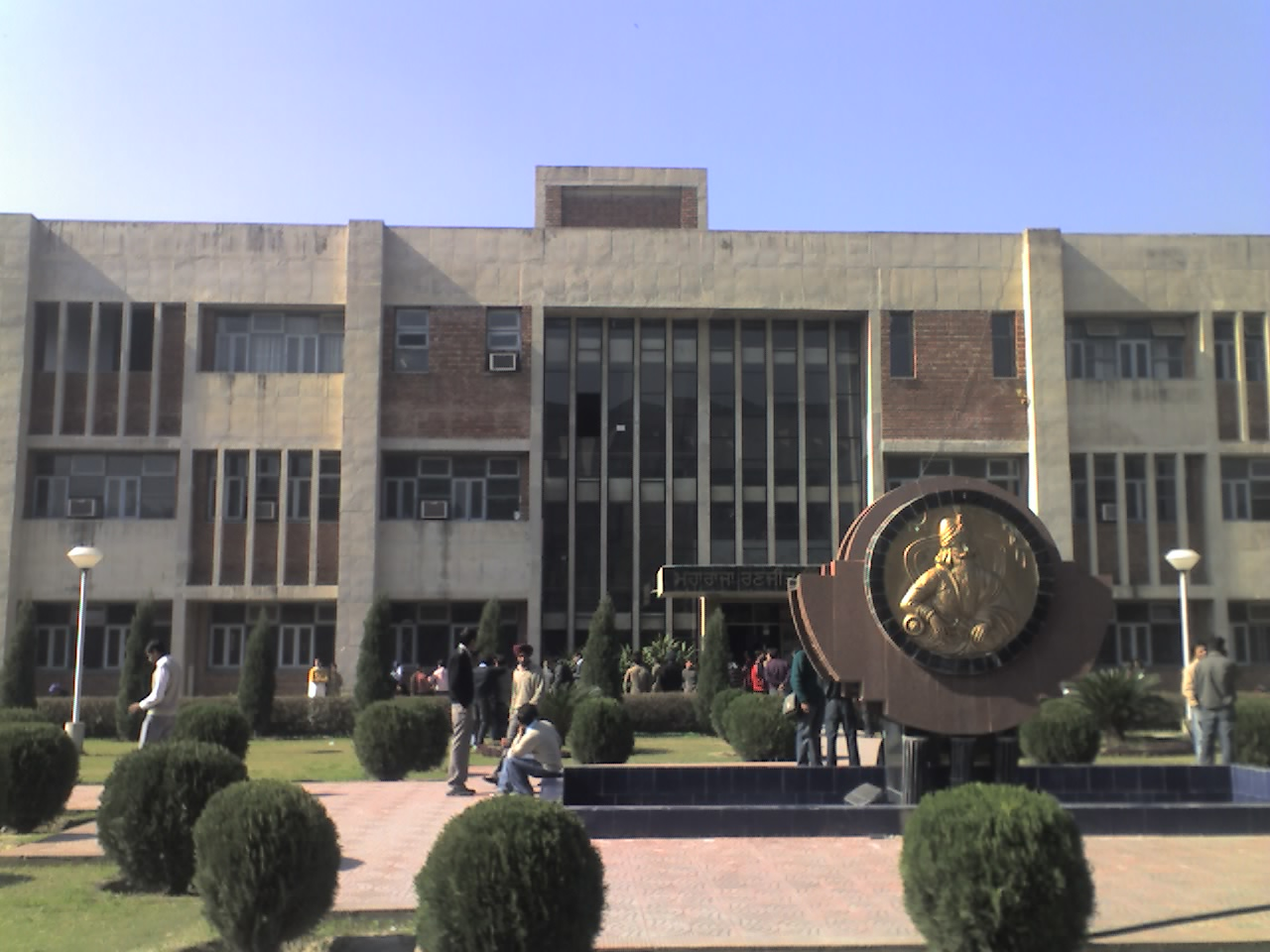
The Ranjit Singh Block at Guru Nanak Dev University

Primary and Secondary education in Punjab is mainly affiliated with the Punjab School Education Board. The state is served by several institutions of higher education, including 23 universities that provide undergraduate and postgraduate courses in all the major arts, humanities, science, engineering, law, medicine, veterinary science, and business. Of the universities 10 are private, 9 are public, 1 is central, and 3 are deemed universities. Reading and writing in the Punjabi language is compulsory till matriculation for every student. Failing to provide this education can result in the cancellation of a school's licence or fines.

The Punjab Agricultural University is a leading institution globally for the study of agriculture and played a significant role in Punjab's Green Revolution of the 1960s–70s. Alumni of the Panjab University, Chandigarh include Manmohan Singh, the former Prime Minister of India, and Dr. Har Gobind Khorana, a biochemistry nobel laureate. One of the oldest institutions of medical education is the Christian Medical College, Ludhiana, which has existed since 1894. Punjab has 104,000 engineering seats.

There is an existing gap in education between men and women, particularly in the rural areas of Punjab. Of a total of 1300 thousand students enrolled in grades five to eight, only 44% are women.

Punjab has also seen a rise in Yoga and Naturopathy education, with the fields slowly becoming popular and student adopting them as their career. The Board of Naturopathy and Yoga Science (B.N.Y.S.) Regional College, Dinanagar is the very first college opened in Dinanagar.

== See also ==
- Economic and Statistical Organisation

== Sources ==
- Datt, Ruddar; Sundharam, K.P.M. (2009). Indian Economy. New Delhi: S. Chand Group. ISBN 978-81-219-0298-4.
- Raychaudhuri, Tapan; Habib, Irfan (2004). The Cambridge Economic History of India, Volume I : c. 1200 – c. 1750. New Delhi: Orient Longman. ISBN 978-81-250-2709-6.
