= Economy of Punjab =

Economy of Punjab may refer to:

- Economy of Punjab, India
- Economy of Punjab, Pakistan
