= Federal Bank for Cooperatives =

Dissolved specialized financial institution in Pakistan

- Company type: Cooperative Bank
- Industry: Banking, Financial services
- Predecessor: Punjab Provincial Cooperative Bank Limited
- Founded: 1976; 50 years ago
- Defunct: April 2014
- Fate: Dissolved
- Area served: Pakistan
- Products: Agricultural loans, Housing loans
- Services: Financial services for cooperatives

The Federal Bank for Cooperatives (FBC) was a specialized financial institution in Pakistan that catered to the needs of housing and agricultural cooperatives. It played an important role in providing agricultural credit during the early decades after its establishment in 1976. It went defunct in April 2014.

== History ==
The concept of cooperative banks was introduced during the British rule, and Punjab Provincial Cooperative Bank Limited (PPCBL), later called FBC, was established under this concept. The bank has faced several challenges over the years, including bureaucratic tangles and restrictions on doing business.

=== Legislative changes ===
In 2018, the legislative body of Pakistan approved two significant pieces of legislation: one that repealed the establishment and regulation of cooperative banking, and another that repealed the bill concerning the corporation responsible for financing house building. The cooperative banking entity, initiated in 2002 following the advice of Pakistan's central banking authority, ceased operations officially in April 2014.
