= Punjab Provincial Cooperative Bank =

Bank of Pakistan

Punjab Provincial Cooperative Bank Limited
- Company type: Public
- Industry: Banking, Financial services
- Founded: 1924; 102 years ago
- Headquarters: Lahore, Pakistan
- Area served: Punjab, Pakistan
- Products: Agricultural loans, Housing loans, Banking services
- Services: Financial services, Cooperative banking
- Website: www.ppcbl.com.pk

The Punjab Provincial Cooperative Bank Limited (PPCBL), established in 1924, is one of the oldest banks in Pakistan. It has historically served as a specialized bank catering to the needs of housing and agricultural cooperatives.

== History ==
PPCBL was established during the British rule and played a major role in providing agricultural credit after 1947 partition with separation of its Indian counterpart Punjab State Cooperative Bank. However, over time, the bank faced financial challenges and bureaucratic problems.

== Sports involvement ==
PPCBL has a cricket team. In May 2023, the PPCBL cricket team defeated Lahore Gymkhana in a friendly match.

== Legal issues ==
In May 2018, a notable scandal involving misappropriation of funds emerged, leading to legal action.

In July 2023 the bank, along with other banks, received fines for violations of the rules.
