= Economic and Statistical Organisation =

State of Punjab statistical agency

Economic and Statistical Organisation Punjab (ESO)

Agency overview
- Formed: 1 January 1949; 0 days' time
- Preceding agency: Board of Economic Inquiry
- Jurisdiction: Punjab State
- Headquarters: Chandigarh, Punjab
- Employees: 829 (Sanctioned)
- Minister responsible: S. Harpal Cheema
- Agency executive: S. Charanjit Singh, Economic Advisor, Government of Punjab

Economic and Statistical Organisation Punjab (ESO), is the nodal statistical agency of State Government of Punjab. ESO provides vital statistics on a wide range of economic, environmental and social issues, to assist and encourage informed decision making and research to various stakeholders including Universities, research institutions, individual scholars, planners, government and non -government institutions. The data and all publications are provided free of cost.

== History ==
ESO was created in 1949 with the advent of planning era in India after Independence. Main objective of creation of this organisation was to fulfill the data needs of the state especially with regards to planning. Prior to creation of this organisation there was a Board of Economic Inquiry created during British period in Punjab.

== Administrative structure ==
=== Chandigarh Head office level ===
ESO has its offices at its Chandigarh based headquarters and all the districts of the State. Economic Advisor to Government of Punjab is the head of the department. There are two directors and three joint directors at the head office. In addition to it there are other supporting staff who collect, compile and present the required statistical data in a professional manner.

=== District level ===
There is a District statistical office in each of the 22 districts of the State of Punjab which is headed by the Deputy Economic and Stastitical Advisor, a grade one officer. At district level it perform following major functions :

1. Statistical work
2. Planning work
3. Other development schemes/ programmes including MPLAD and 20 Point etc.

=== Block level ===
Punjab is among very few States of Indian Union which has its statistical machinery at the sub district i.e. block level. One statistical personnel known as "investigator" is posted at the block level in the State who collect the basic information on over 250 items from each of the village. This data is used for grass root level planning and other decision in the State. As on 31 March 2016 there are 146 blocks and over 12154 villages.

== Major publications ==
- Statistical Abstract of Punjab-Periodicity, Annual
- Economic Survey of Punjab- Periodicity Annual
- Village Directory- Periodicity, Annual
- State Income -Periodicity, Annual
- District level Planning -Periodicity regular
- MPLAD Scheme-Periodicity regular
- 20 Point Progrrame-Periodicity regula
