= Punjab State Cooperative Bank =

Bank of India

The Punjab State Co-operative Bank Limited
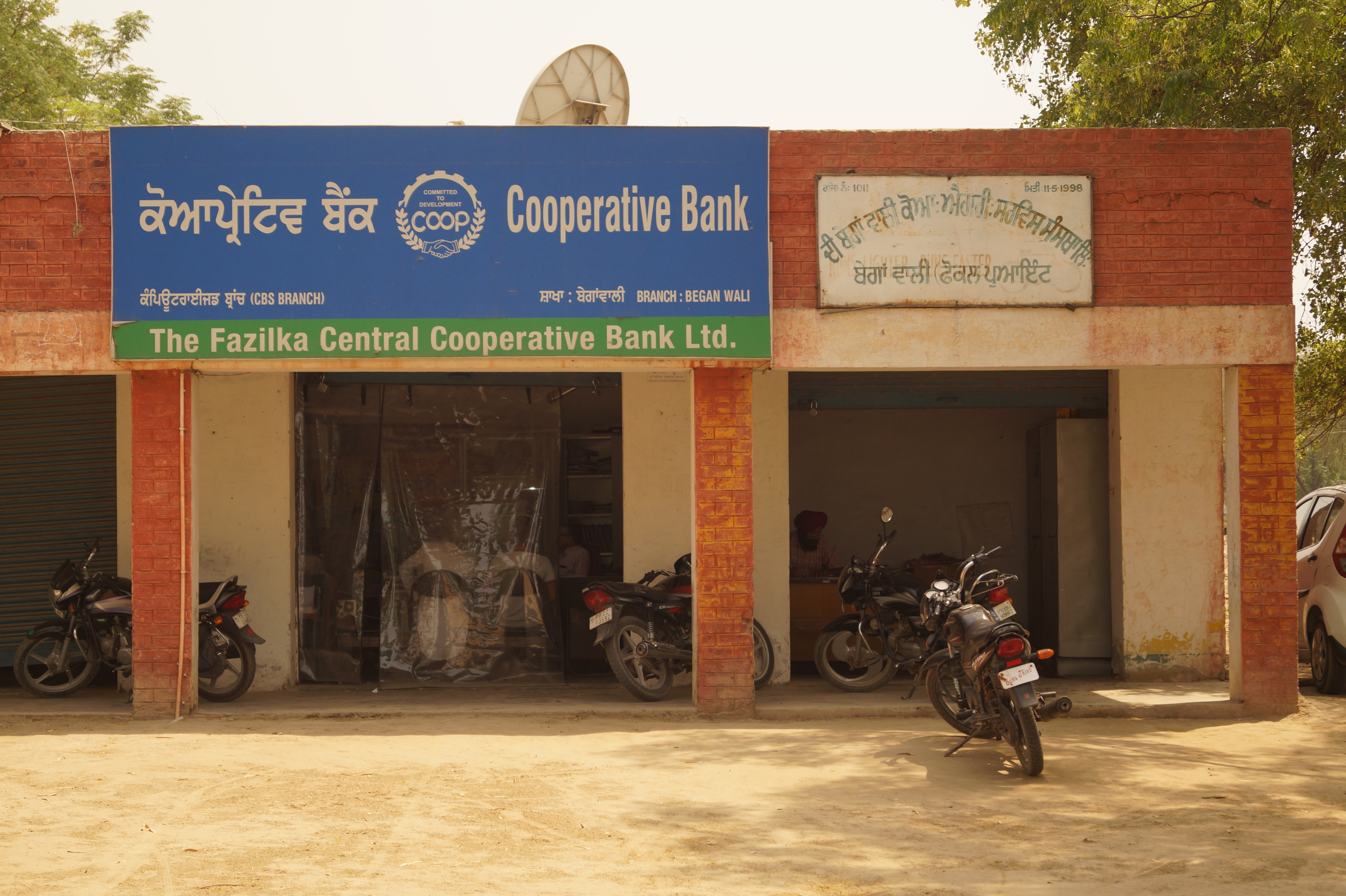
- a Bank branch in Fazilka district
- Type: Cooperative Bank
- Industry: Banking, Financial services
- Headquarters: Chandigarh, Punjab, India
- Area served: Punjab, India
- Products: Savings accounts, loans, digital banking
- Owner: Chandigarh Administration, Cooperative Societies, Individual Shareholders
- Website: apex.pbcoopbank.in

The Punjab State Cooperative Bank Ltd. (PSCB) is a cooperative bank headquartered in Chandigarh, Punjab, India. Established in 1949, it serves as the apex cooperative bank in Punjab, focusing on agricultural financing, rural banking, and financial inclusion. Regulated by the Reserve Bank of India (RBI) and registered under the Cooperative Societies Act, PSCB provides banking services through its branch network and digital platforms, catering to urban and rural customers across Punjab and Chandigarh.

== History ==
Founded in 1949, PSCB was established to support Punjab’s Cooperative sector, particularly in agriculture and rural development. Based in Chandigarh, the bank has expanded its services to meet evolving customer needs while maintaining its cooperative principles. In 2018, the Punjab government approved the merger of 20 District Central Cooperative Banks (DCCBs) with PSCB to streamline operations and strengthen the Cooperative banking framework. The bank has launched a mobile banking application in 2023 to enhance customer access to services.

== Operations ==
PSCB operates multiple branches across Punjab and Chandigarh and focuses on rural communities. The bank offers financial products, including savings and current accounts, agricultural loans, and digital payment services such as NEFT, RTGS, IMPS, and UPI. In 2024, PSCB introduced UPI services. The bank’s mobile banking app, launched in 2023, enables users to manage accounts, transfer funds, request cheque books, and control debit card settings.

PSCB has also entered agreements to improve transaction efficiency, signing a pact to ensure seamless digital banking operations for its customers. The bank’s IFSC code (TPSC0CHD001) supports online transactions, enhancing accessibility.

== Services and initiatives ==
PSCB prioritizes agricultural financing to support Punjab’s farming community, offering loans and other financial products tailored to rural needs. The bank promotes financial inclusion through participation in state government schemes and digital banking advancements. In 2024, PSCB waived processing fees until November 15 to celebrate Diwali, providing financial relief to customers during the festive season.

The bank offers cooperative internships to engage young professionals and foster skill development in the cooperative sector. Its digital initiatives, including UPI and mobile banking, enhance customer convenience while maintaining security and accessibility.

== Financial support ==
PSCB has faced financial challenges, prompting government intervention. In 2023, the Punjab government released a bailout package to bolster the bank’s stability and ensure continued service delivery.

== Regulation and compliance ==
PSCB operates under the oversight of the Reserve Bank of India and adheres to the Cooperative Societies Act. The bank complies with RBI guidelines for digital transactions, customer protection, and financial transparency, ensuring reliability and trust in its operations.
