= Jainism and Sikhism =

Indian religions

Jainism (/ˈdʒeɪnɪzəm/), traditionally known as Jain Dharma, is an ancient Indian religion. Jain dharma traces its spiritual ideas and history through a succession of twenty-four leaders or tirthankaras, with the first in current time cycle being Lord Rishabhanatha, whom the Jain tradition holds to have lived millions of years ago, the twenty-third tirthankara Parshvanatha whom historians date to 8th or 7th century BCE, and the 24th tirthankara, Mahāvīra around 500 BCE. Jains believe that Jainism is an eternal dharma with the tirthankaras guiding every cycle of the Jain cosmology.

The main religious premises of the Jain dharma are ahiṃsā (non-violence), anekāntavāda (many-sidedness), aparigraha (non-attachment) and asceticism (abstinence from sensual pleasures). Devout Jains take five main vows: ahiṃsā (non-violence), satya (truth), asteya (not stealing), brahmacharya (sexual continence), and aparigraha (non-possessiveness). These principles have affected Jain culture in many ways, such as leading to a predominantly vegetarian lifestyle. Parasparopagraho Jīvānām (the function of souls is to help one another) is its motto and the Ṇamōkāra mantra is its most common and basic prayer.

Sikhism (/ˈsɪkɪzəm/); Punjabi: ਸਿੱਖੀ or Sikhi (Sikkhī, [ˈsɪkːʰiː], from ਸਿੱਖ, Sikh, 'disciple', 'seeker', or 'learner'), on the other hand, is a monotheistic religion that originated in the Punjab region of the Indian subcontinent around the end of the 15th century CE. One of the youngest of the major religions and the world's fifth-largest organized religion, it comprises about 25 million Sikhs as of the early 21st century. However, according to rough estimates, there are around 120–150 million (12–15 crore) Nanak Naam Lewas people across the world who also believe in 10 Sikh gurus and the Guru Granth Sahib.

Sikhism developed from the spiritual teachings of Guru Nanak, the first Guru (1469–1539), and of the nine Sikh gurus who succeeded him. The tenth guru, Gobind Singh (1676–1708), named the Sikh scripture Guru Granth Sahib as his successor, bringing to a close the line of human gurus and establishing the scripture as the eternal, religious spiritual guide for Sikhs. Guru Nanak taught that living an "active, creative, and practical life" of "truthfulness, fidelity, self-control and purity" is above the metaphysical truth, and that the ideal man "establishes union with God, knows His Will, and carries out that Will". Guru Hargobind, the sixth Sikh Guru (1606–1644), established the concept of the mutual co-existence of the miri (political/temporal) and piri (spiritual) realms.

== History ==
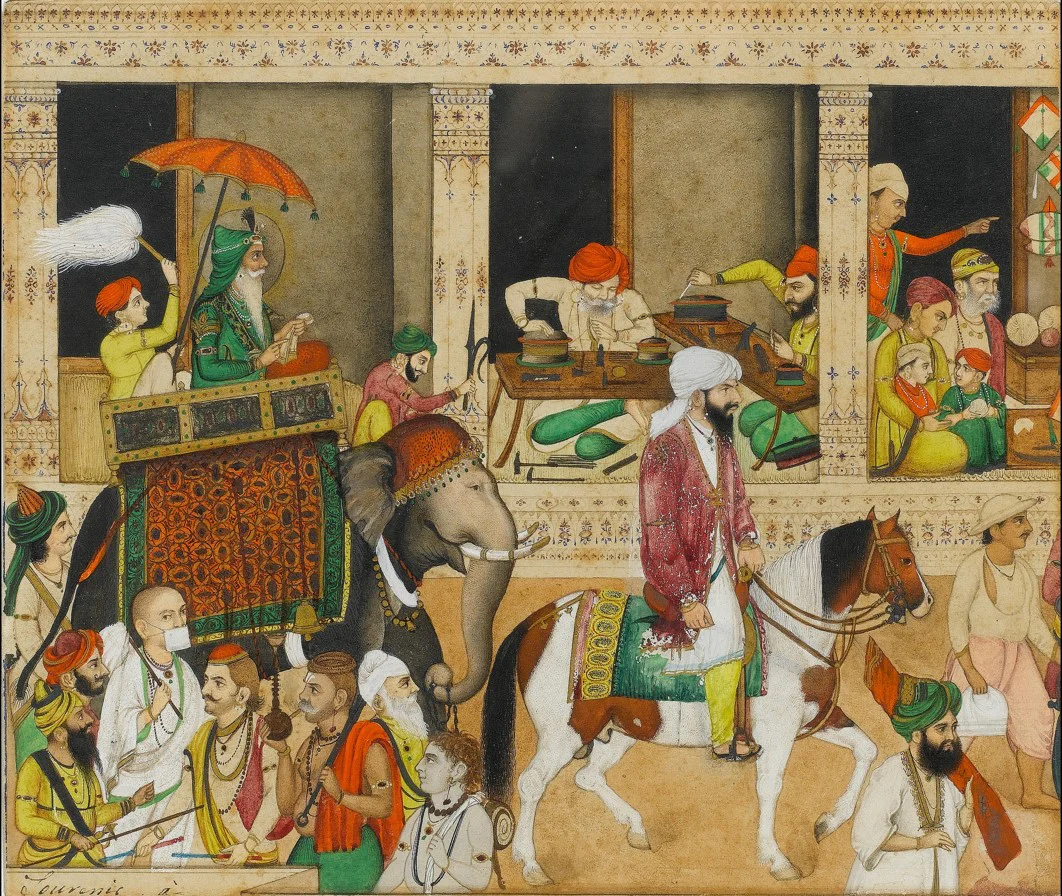
Maharaja Ranjit Singh in a bazaar, c. 1840–1845. A Jain monk can be spotted on the bottom-left (mouth covered and wearing white)

The sacred books of Jainism are called Agamas. The Jaina Agamas or scriptures are the works of the immediate disciples of Mahavira. The first sacred books of the Jaina are in Prakrit or Ardha Magadhi language. They were given their written form in the 5th century at Vallabhi, in Gujarat. Dr. L. M. Joshi is of the opinion that the literature of Jainism is vast and varied. Its subject matter includes not only ascetic culture, morality, religion and philosophy, but also fables fairy-tales, legendary romances, history, hagiography, mythology and cosmology. "The body of literature known as Agamas includes a large number of texts. These are divided into two classes" Anga Agamas or the original twelve books and Angabahya Agamas or the texts outside of the original twelve books.

The Jain Scriptures are the source books of Jain ethics, yoga, religion, philosophy and mythology. The Tattvartha Sutra is a famous book which summarizes Jain teachings. The Ācārāṅga Sūtra deals chiefly with the ethical conduct and discipline of monks. The Kalpasutra describes in detail the life-story of Mahavira. A most remarkable description of hells is given in Sutrakritanga. The Sthananga discusses dogmatic topics, The Upasakadasha deals with pious men of the time of Mahavira. The contents of other book are mixed and varied. They deal with myths and legends, ethical and monastic discipline, hells and heavens, cosmology and astrology.

The Jain system, like the Buddhist, is non-theistic. It does not acknowledge the existence of a Creator God. Another important feature is that it is a pluralistic system. The atmans are many, infinite in number. Moksha is not absorption into the supreme but the attainment of a perfect, luminous and blessed atman which is without body and without actions.

Philosophically, an important contribution of Jainism is the doctrine of anekantavada. The Jaina thinkers thought that reality can be examined from many (aneka) standpoints (anta). A thing can be described from at least seven standpoints (saptabhangi) and all can be equally true. This doctrine has contributed to the tolerance of contrary opinions among theologians and philosophers. In modern times, when exclusive claims of religions are under strain, this doctrine has a special relevance and meaning.

Sikhism (ਸਿੱਖੀ), amongst the youngest of the major world religions, originated and primarily developed in the 15th–17th century sub-continental India (South Asia). The word Sikhi derives from the word Sikh, which itself is based on the Sanskrit root "śiṣya" (शिष्यः), meaning a "disciple" or "learner". Guru Nanak Dev Ji was the founder of Sikhi. He was born in 1469 in the village of Nankana Sahib, near Lahore in present-day Pakistan. The faith system is based on the teachings of Guru Nanak Dev Ji and ten successive Sikh Gurus (divine messengers or enlighteners), with the last one being the revealed sacred scripture, Guru Granth Sahib. This system of religious philosophy and expression has been traditionally known as Gurmat (literally the counsel of the Gurus) or the Sikh Dharma. With around 30 million followers worldwide, Sikhism is the fifth largest organized religion in the world.

The principal belief of Sikhism is faith in Waheguruji – represented using the sacred symbol of ik onkar, the Universal God. Sikhism advocates the pursuit of salvation through disciplined, personal meditation on the name and message of God. A key distinctive feature of Sikhism is a non-anthropomorphic concept of God, to the extent that one can interpret God as the entire creation itself.

The followers of Sikhism, or Sikhs, are ordained to follow the teachings of the ten Sikh Gurus, enshrined in the holy scripture the Guru Granth Sahib. While compiling the scripture, the fifth Sikh Guru, Guru Arjan Dev Ji incorporated not only the writings of the Sikh Gurus, but also included selected works of many devotees and saints from diverse socio-economic and religious backgrounds, who believed in the unity of God and denounced caste and superstition. The text was decreed by Guru Gobind Singh Ji, the tenth and last human guru, as the final guru of the Khalsa Panth.

Sikhism's traditions and teachings are distinctively associated with the history, society and culture of the Punjab region, the traditional homeland of the Sikhs and the site of the Sikh Empire. Presently, a majority of the Sikhs live in Punjab, India, and until India's partition in 1947, one million of Sikhs had lived in what is now Pakistani Punjab. Besides Sikhi and Gurmat, Sikhism is also referred to as Aad-Matt (the primal counsel).

=== Jain conversions to Sikhism ===
Many Bhabra Jains were converted to Sikhism by the preacher Naria of Jahman village in Lahore district.

=== Gujranwala dispute ===
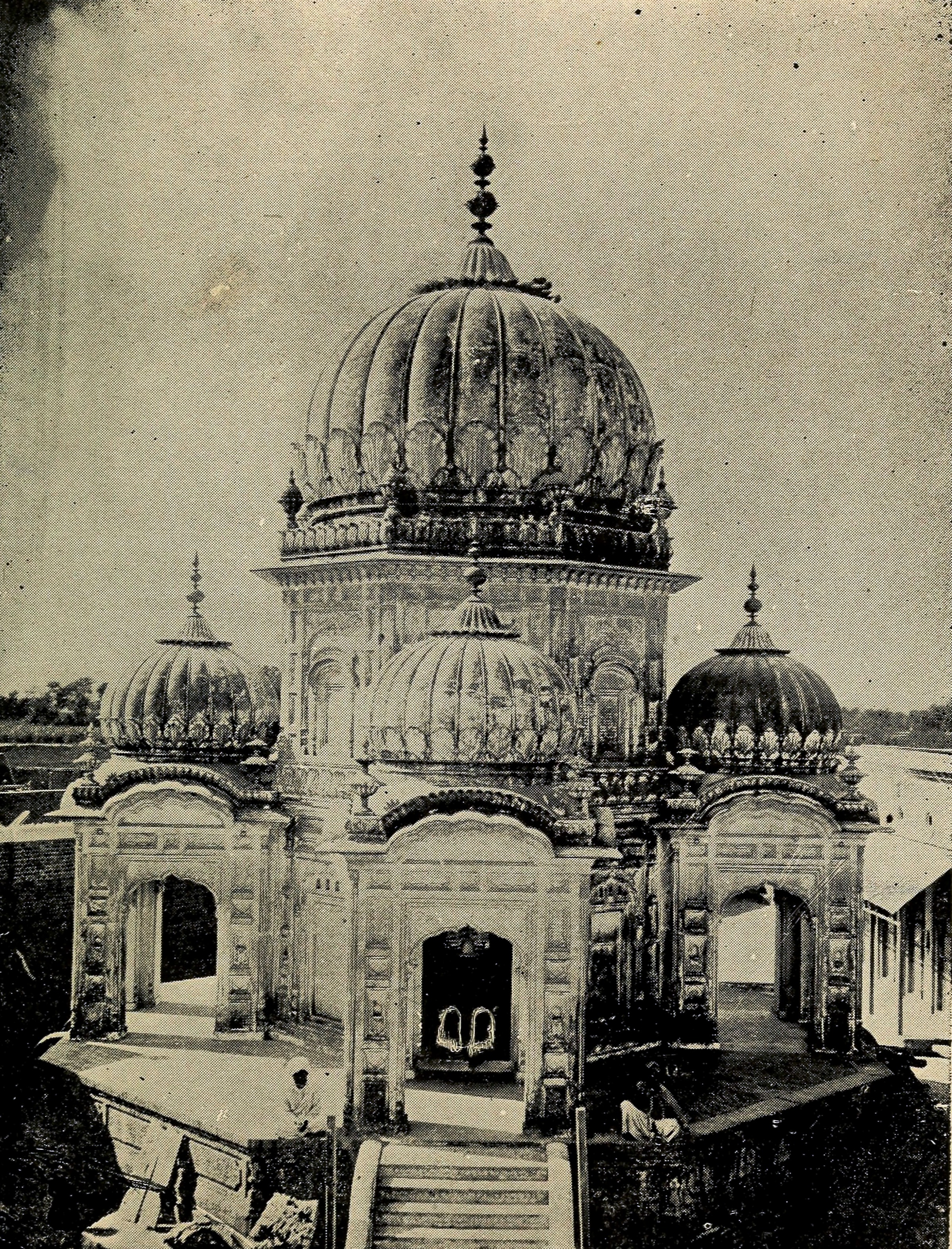
Shrine of Acharya Vijayanand Suri located in Gujranwala that some have disputed as being the samadhi of Charat Singh. Photograph from Chicago Prashnottar, 1918

A samadhi (Indic cenotaph tomb) of Charat Singh is believed by some Sikhs to be located at Gujranwala, near the Sheranwala Bagh. Jains dispute this and claim the structure is a Jain temple built in memory of a Jain scholar named Acharya Vijayanand Suri, whose father served in the military of Maharaja Ranjit Singh as an official. This theory is further refuted by the Umdat-ut-Tawarikh, a chronicle on the reign of Ranjit Singh and his successors by Sohan Lal Suri, the court recorder of the Sikh Empire. The chronicle states that Ranjit Singh, after leaving a village named Halla, paid a visit to his grandfather's samadhi on 5 October 1838 located near a village named Jalal. It further states he made an ardas and a donation of 200 rupees. After the visit, he left for a village called Karala. Therefore, the samadhi of Charat Singh is located near a village named Jalal, not Gujranwala.

== Lineage of teachers ==
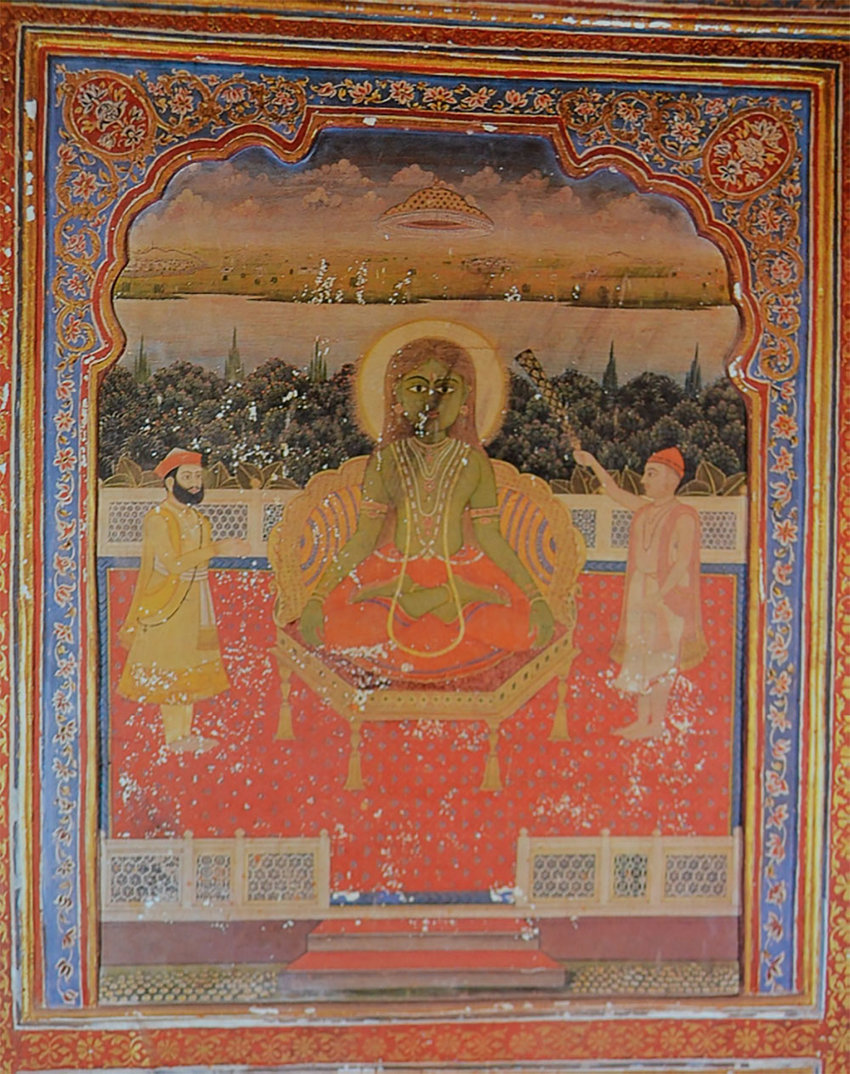
Mural of Arihanta Deva, Jain master Parsvanath, Sheesh Mahal, Qila Mubarak, Patiala, Punjab

The 24th tirthankara of the Jain community was Mahavira, the last in a series who lived in East India.

1. Lord Rishabha-is the first Tīrthaṅkara (lit. 'ford-maker') of Jainism and the founder of Ikshvaku dynasty. He was the first of twenty-four teachers in the present half-cycle of time in Jain cosmology, and called a "ford maker" because his teachings helped one across the sea of interminable rebirths and deaths. Jain legends depict him as having lived millions of years ago. He was the spiritual successor of Samprati Bhagwan, the last Tirthankar of previous time cycle.
2. Ajitanath
3. Sambhavanatha
4. Abhinandananatha
5. Sumatinatha
6. Padmaprabha
7. Suparshvanath
8. Chandraprabha
9. Suvidhinath Swami or Puspadanta
10. Sheetalnath
11. Shreyansanath
12. Vasupujya
13. Vimalnatha
14. Anantnath
15. Dharmanath
16. Shantinatha
17. Kunthunath
18. Aranath
19. Mallinath
20. Munisuvrata
21. Naminatha
22. Neminatha
23. Parshwanath
24. Mahavira- Mahavira taught that observance of the vows of ahimsa (non-violence), satya (truth), asteya (non-stealing), brahmacharya (chastity), and aparigraha (non-attachment) are necessary for spiritual liberation. He taught the principles of Anekantavada (many-sided reality): syadvada and nayavada. Mahavira's teachings were compiled by Indrabhuti Gautama (his chief disciple) as the Jain Agamas.

Sikhism has 10 Gurus, with the religious text called the Guru Granth Sahib according status as the final Guru by Guru Gobind Singh.

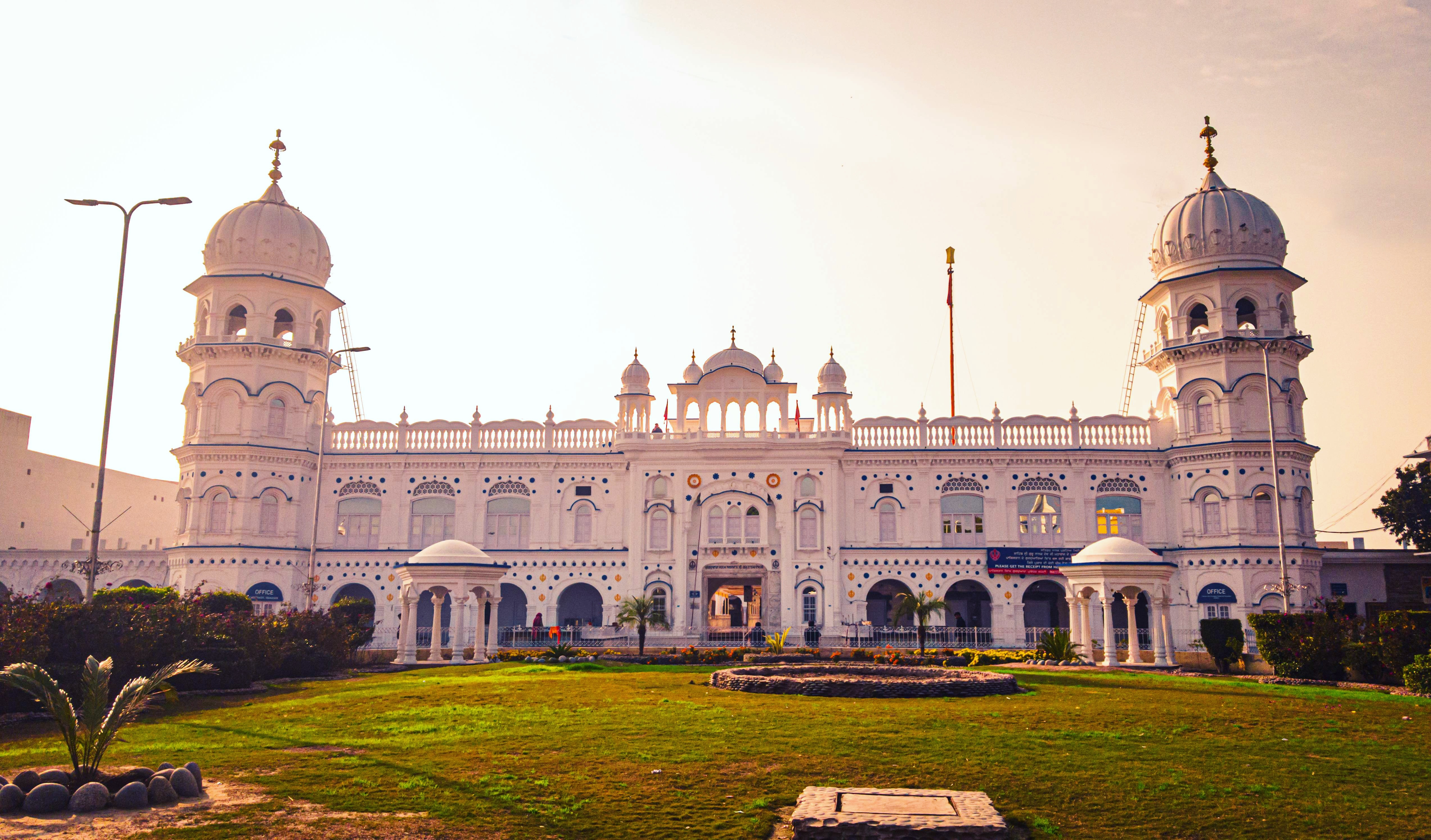
Nankana Sahib, Pakistan the place where Guru Nanak was born

1. Guru Nanak JI- The founder of Sikhism, studied many philosophies and talked to many scholars like the Pope at Rome, the Bani Shaiba at Mecca, the Dalai Lama at Lhasa and various Sadhus, Monks and Sufi saints. He established the base of Sikhism and is respected by Muslims, Hindus and Nanak Panthis as well. He traveled the world and was a revolutionary from birth. When he was ten years old he refused to put janeu and stopped following blind rituals. He trained in Meditation, Gatka, Shastar Vidya and Yoga. When Guru Nanak was bathing in a nearby river he did not come back to his home for three days. When he did he only said one phrase- "Na Koi Hindu, Na koi Musalman" (No one is Hindu, No one is Muslim)". Guru Nanak had discourses with many rulers and spirituals about how they were treating the peasants including Babur and The Pope. He later went to North Sri Lanka to learn the faith of the South Indians and Tibet to meet the Dalai Lama. He even performed the Hajj.
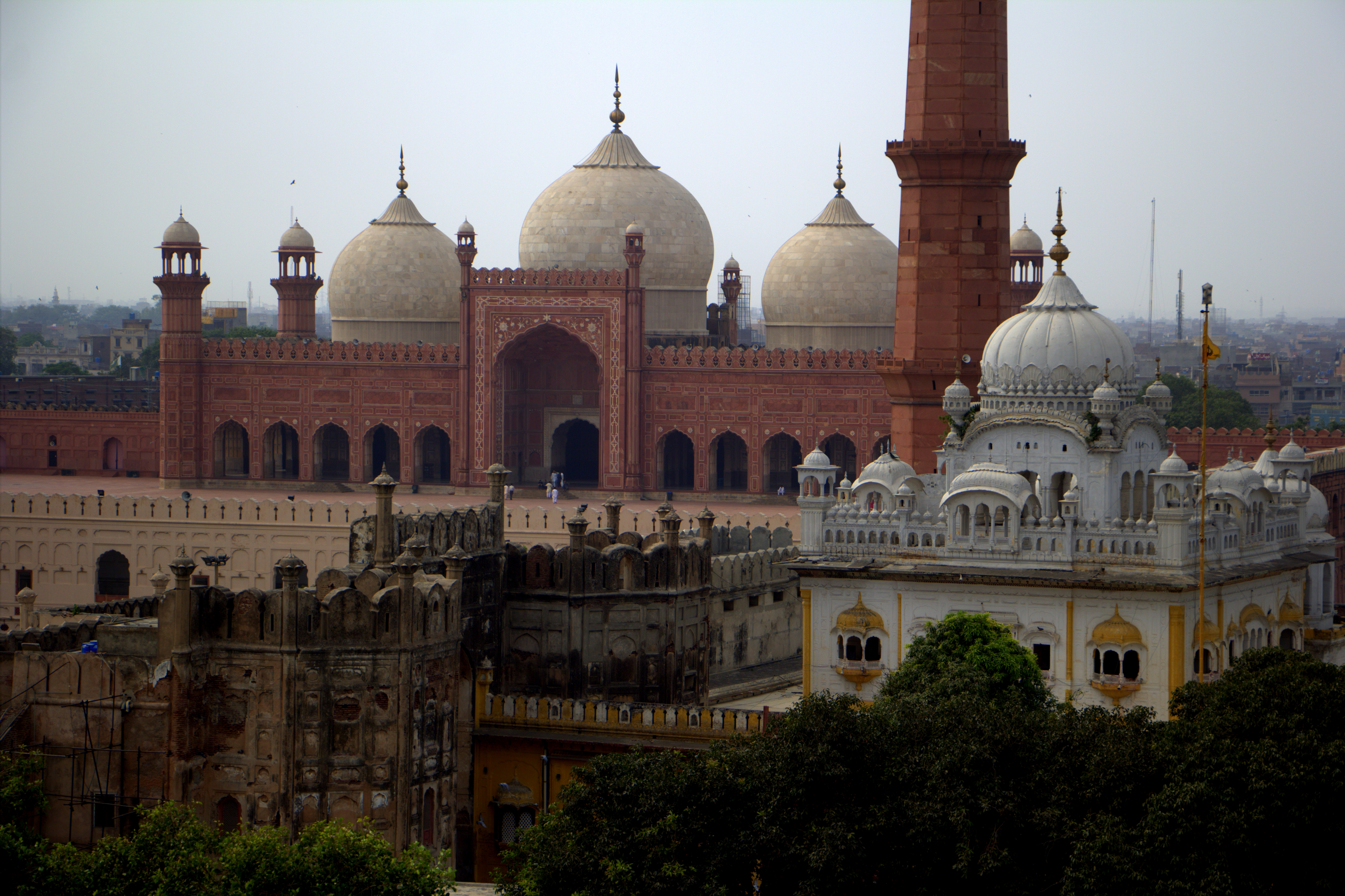
  Gurdwara Dera Sahib next to Badshahi Mosque
2. Guru Angad Ji- Invented the script of Gurmukhi to show that the Sikh faith is separate from the faith of the Muslims and Hindus. He increased the practice of Langar and education within all people, the also compiled the Janamsakhis along with Bhai Bala. Through their own life conduct, Guru Ji demonstrated the principles of Nishkam Sewa (selfless service) to humanity, complete surrender to the Guru and to the will of God, and disapproval of exhibitionism and hypocrisy. .Maintained and developed the institution of Langar started by Guru Nanak Dev Ji.
3. Guru Amar Das Ji- Increased women empowerment and abolished Hindu Marriage customs, naming ceremonies and Shaving off one's head while cremating and completely eradicated the practice of Sati.
4. Guru Ram Das Ji- Started the compilation of The Adi Granth and collected the sayings and scriptures of the earlier gurus. He also stopped many sects from rising in Sikhism such as the Minas and Udiasis.
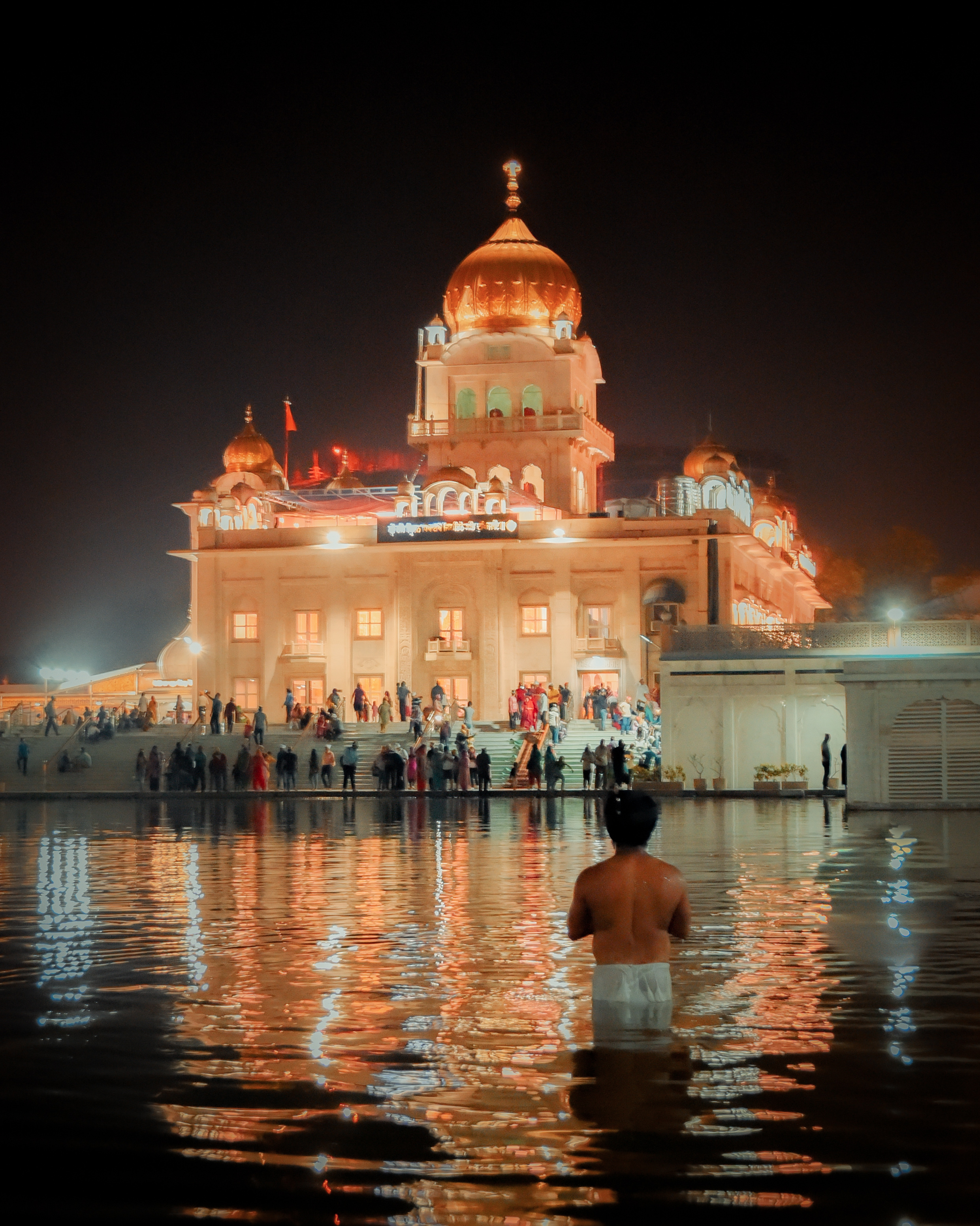
  Gurudwara Bangla Sahib in Delhi the place where Guru Harkrishan died
5. Guru Arjan Dev Ji- He completed the Guru Granth Sahib ji and added the most verses in it and included the works of Sant Kabir, Guru Ravidas, Trilochan, Namdev etc and Muslim saints such as Bhai Mardana, Bhagat Farid, Bhagat Beni, Balwant Rai etc. He is also called Shaheedan-De-Saraaj or The crown of Martyrs, when Khurram was revolting Guru Arjan Dev Ji allowed him to come in the gurudwara and eat langer. Afterwards the guruji was given the choice of converting to Islam or be brutally torchered. He was made to sit on a boiling plate and then dip into the freezing Beas River. He also created the Golden Temple or Darbar Sahib.
6. Guru Hargobind Sahib Ji- After Guru Arjan Dev ji was he gave him an order, that Sikhs should know how to defend themselves. Instead of the Tikka Guru Hargobind Sahib ji came out of the Darbar Sahib with two swords, the Miri and the Piri, one for Spirituality and one for Justice, this inspired many quotes such as Sant Sipahi and Degh Tegh Fateh. He fought many battles with both Jahangir and Shah Jahan. He also raised a fort in front of the Darbar Sahib, The Akal Takht, being tilted 22 degrees away from the Darbar Sahib directly at Red Fort challenging Mughal authority.
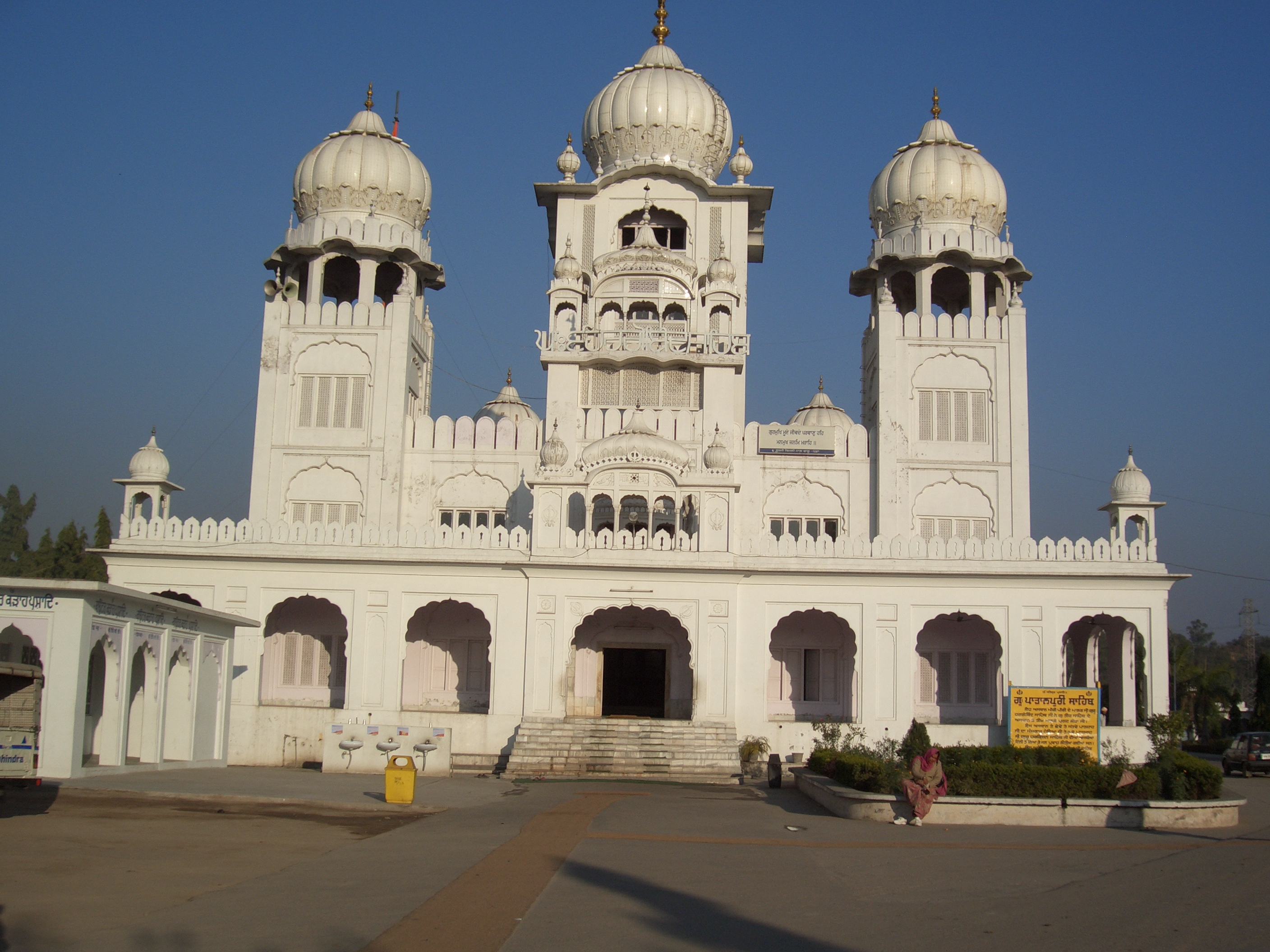
7. Kiratpur Sahib
  Guru Har Rai Ji- After the death of Guru Hargobind Sahib Ji kept an armed force but did not engage in warfare. He kept friendly relations with the Mughals and had the largest Zoological park and Hospital in the Mughal Empire and cured Dara Shikoh from Smallpox at Kiratpur Sahib.
8. Guru Harkrishan Ji- Guru Harkrishan Ji was summoned to Delhi by Aurangzeb when he cured 40 people from smallpox while risking himself to cure them.
9. Guru 'Tegh' Bahadur Ji- Guru Tegh Bahadur Ji was a admirer of many faiths and he wrote lots of bani in the Guru Granth Sahib Ji. He travelled to Kashmir and when he heard that Hindus and Buddhists were being forcefully converted to Islam he surrendered himself to Aurangzeb at Agra. He challenged Aurangzeb and said that if he could convert him then he can convert the Kashmiris. Aurangzeb accepted and torchered him for 90 days until he was beheaded. He is the only prophet in the world to die for another faith.
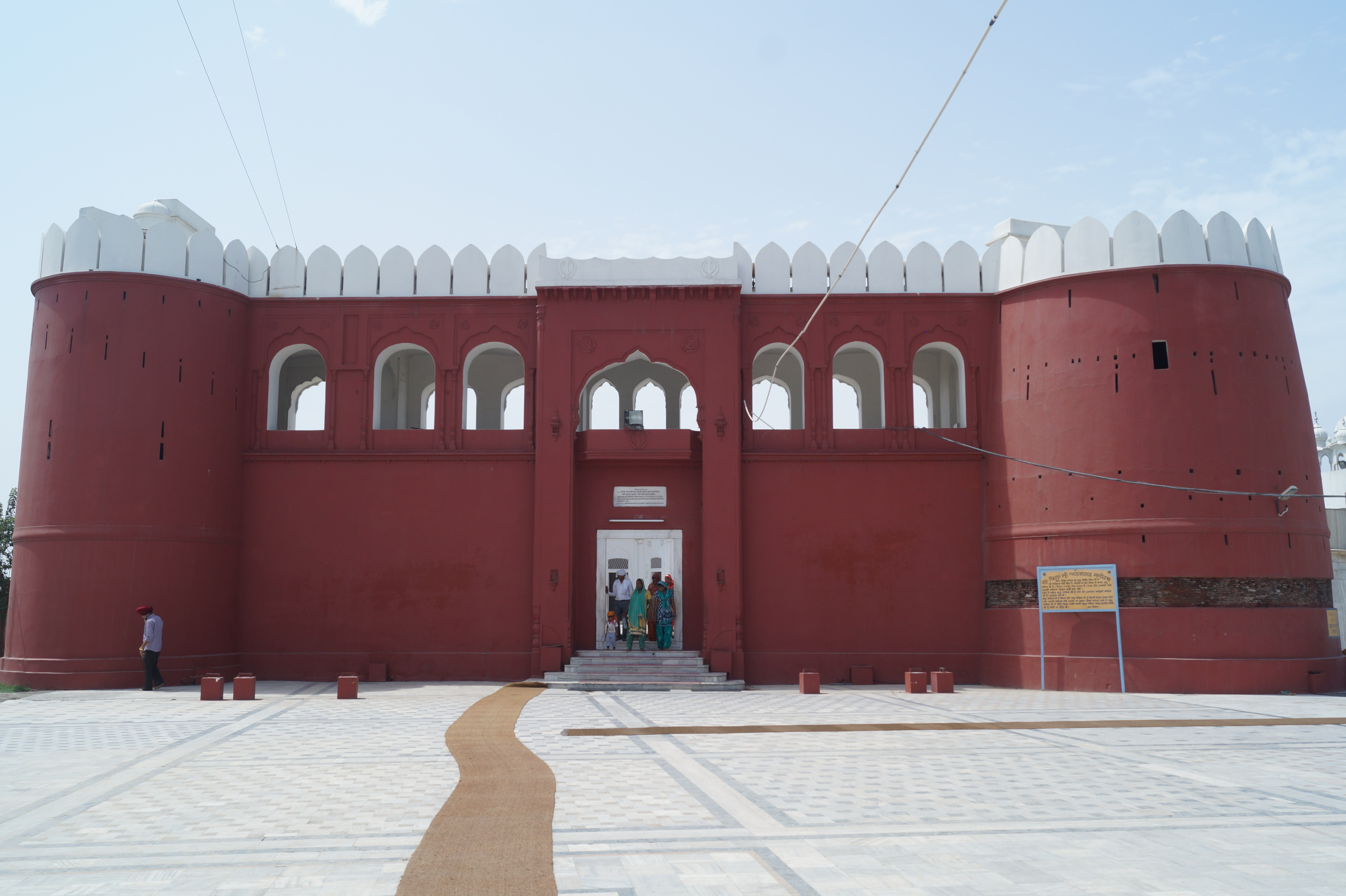
  Qila Anandgarh Sahib or The Fort of Bliss made to protect Anandpur against the Hindu Hill Chieftains
10. Shah-i-Shenshah Guru Gobind Singh Ji- After Guru Tegh Bahadur ji's martyrdom Guru Gobind Singh Ji created many poems compositions and letters, including Fatehnamah, Ugardandis, Lakhi Jungle Khalsa, Hikayatan, Akal Ustat, Japji Sahib etc, these were incorporated into the Dasam Granth and Sarbloh Granth respectively. He stayed at Anandpur Sahib for most of his life and the Hindu Hill Chieftains were jealous of his riches so the Kingdoms of Kahlur, Bilaspur, Garhwal and some common Hindus made an alliance to fight him. He and the kingdom of Una allied and won the Battle of Bhangani. The even more Himachali states allied and still lost to the Guruji. This showed the Guruji's influence and military strength in the area. The Hindu chieftains allied with Wazir Khan of Sirhind and the Subedar of Lahore and together they still lost. One day Guruji started retreating from Anandpur Sahib and he got separated with his two sons aged 5 and 9 due to the cold Satluj River.
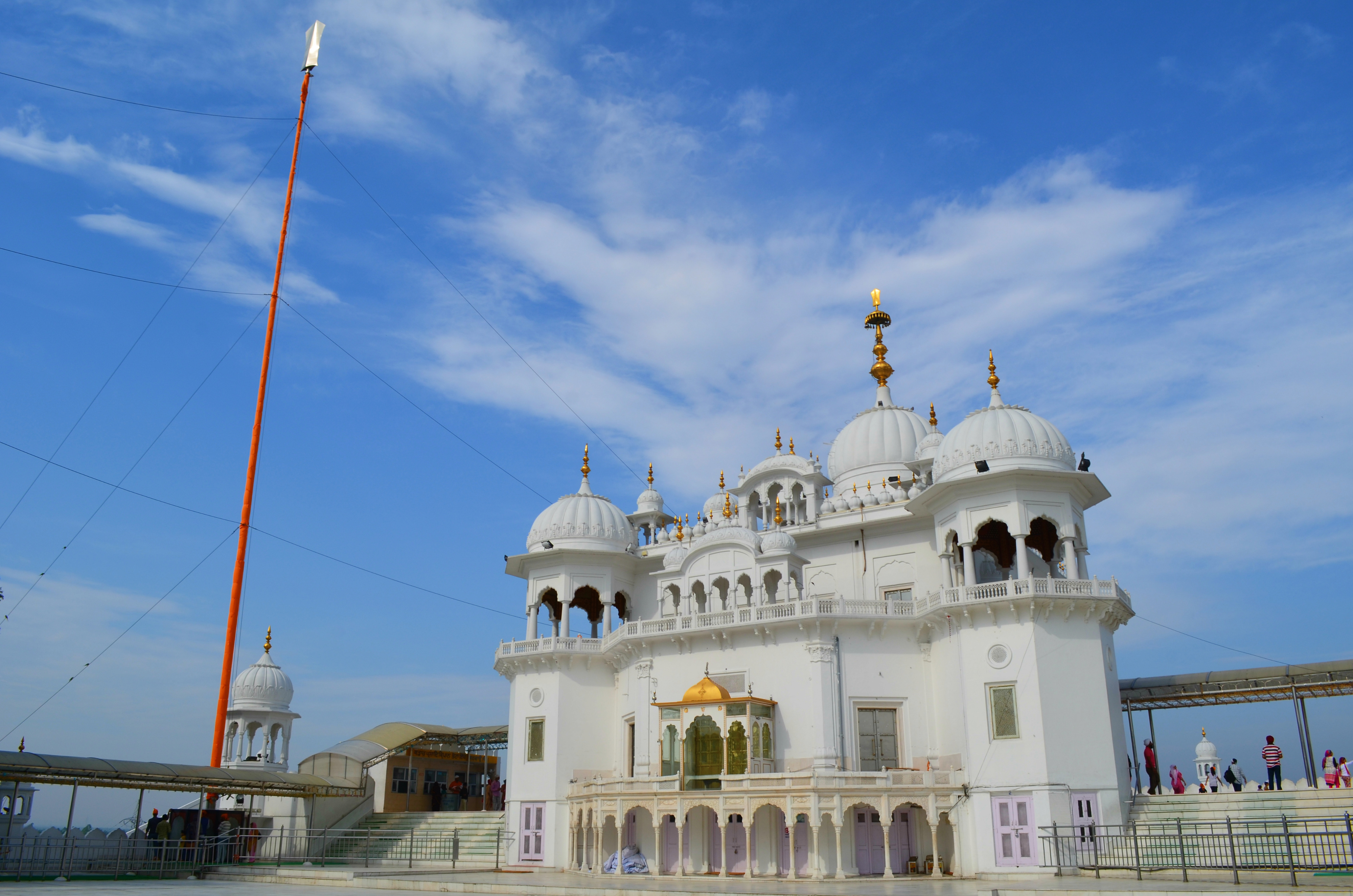
  Takht Dhan Keshgarh Sahib one of the Panj Takht.
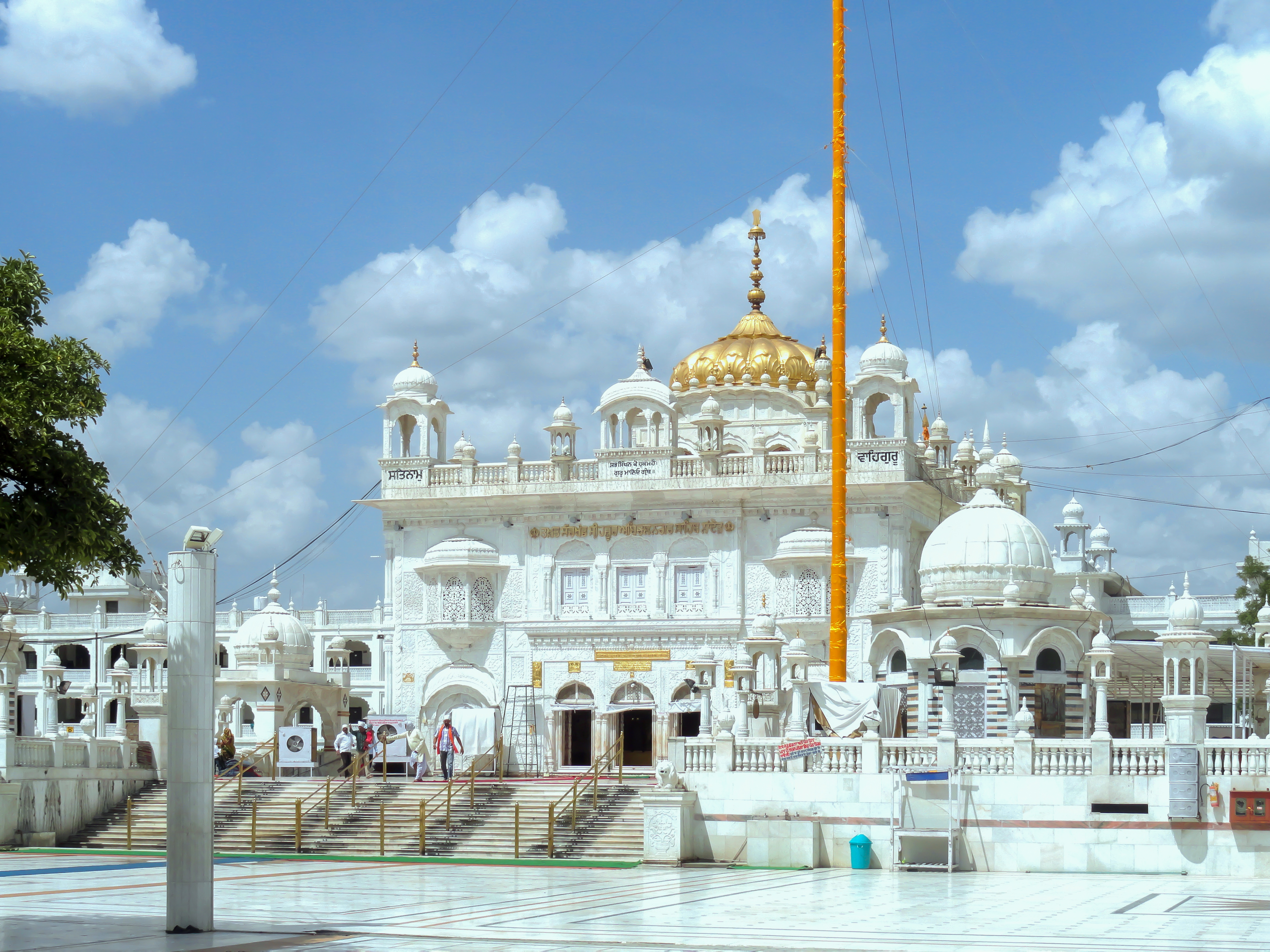
  Takht Dhan Hazur Sahib, the place where Guru Gobind Singh Ji took his last breath
  He entrusted his brahmin cook, Gangu Brahmin, to take care of them but Gangu Brahmin sold them to Wazir Khan. In the meantime Aurangzeb dispatched 50,000-75,000 troops to attack the Guruji. after he sent his elder sons and 42 others to fight only 17,000 Mughals came back alive, his elder sons died on the battlefield. The younger sons and their grandmother remained trapped in the same week that their brothers died. Wazir Khan said that he would give them riches if they convert and immurement if they do not, they chose death, till now Sahibzada Fateh Singh is the youngest Martyr in the history of the World. Guru Gobind Singh Ji sent his letter of victory or Zafarnamah to Aurangzeb and they signed a treaty. Later when Aurangzeb Died and the Guruji was in Rajputana there was a war of succession between Muhammad Azam Shah and Bahadur Shah I and Guru Gobind Singh Ji sided with Bahadur Shah I who was secular in his views and Muhammad Azam Shah was killed by a Sikh soldier. On his way to Aurangabad the Guruji was stabbed three times in his lungs, and he woke up and killed the assassin. He survived for three more weeks before dying in Nanded, Maharashtra.

== Mutual cooperation ==
Author Khushvant Singh notes that many eminent Jains never shied from helping the cause of an ascetic. They tremendously helped the Sikh gurus by coming to their help in difficult times. When the ninth Sikh guru, Guru Tegh Bahadur, was on his preaching mission in eastern India, he and his family were invited by Salis Rai Johri to stay in his haveli in Patna. In his hukamnamas sent from Assam, the guru referred to Patna as guru-ka-ghar, meaning "home of the guru". Salis Rai donated half of his haveli to build a gurdwara, Janam Sthan, because Guru Gobind Singh was born there. On the other half, he built a Śvētāmbara Jain temple; both have a common wall.

Todar Mal was an Oswal Jain who rose to become the diwan in the court of Nawab Wazir Khan of Sirhind. When the Nawab had Guru Gobind Singh's two younger sons put to death, Todar Mal conveyed the sad news to their grandmother—who died of shock. Diwan Todar Mal donated his own family gold to purchase a small piece of land to cremate the young sons of the guru. He had built Gurdwara Jyoti Sarup on the site of the cremation at Fatehgarh Sahib. A large hall of the gurdwara honours the builder by being named after him: Diwan Todar Mal Jain Yadagiri Hall.

== Practices and differences ==
=== Diwali ===
Diwali is celebrated by both religions. Although Sikhs celebrate the day as Bandi Chhor Divas, the homecoming to Amritsar of the sixth Sikh Guru, Guru Hargobind from Gwalior. The release of 52 Rajas from the fort of Gwalior is attributed to this Guru.

For Jains, Diwali is the celebration of the 24th Tirthankara Mahavira, attaining Nirvana on this day at Pavapuri on October 15, 527 BCE, on Chaturdashi of Karti.

=== Ahimsa and vegetarianism ===
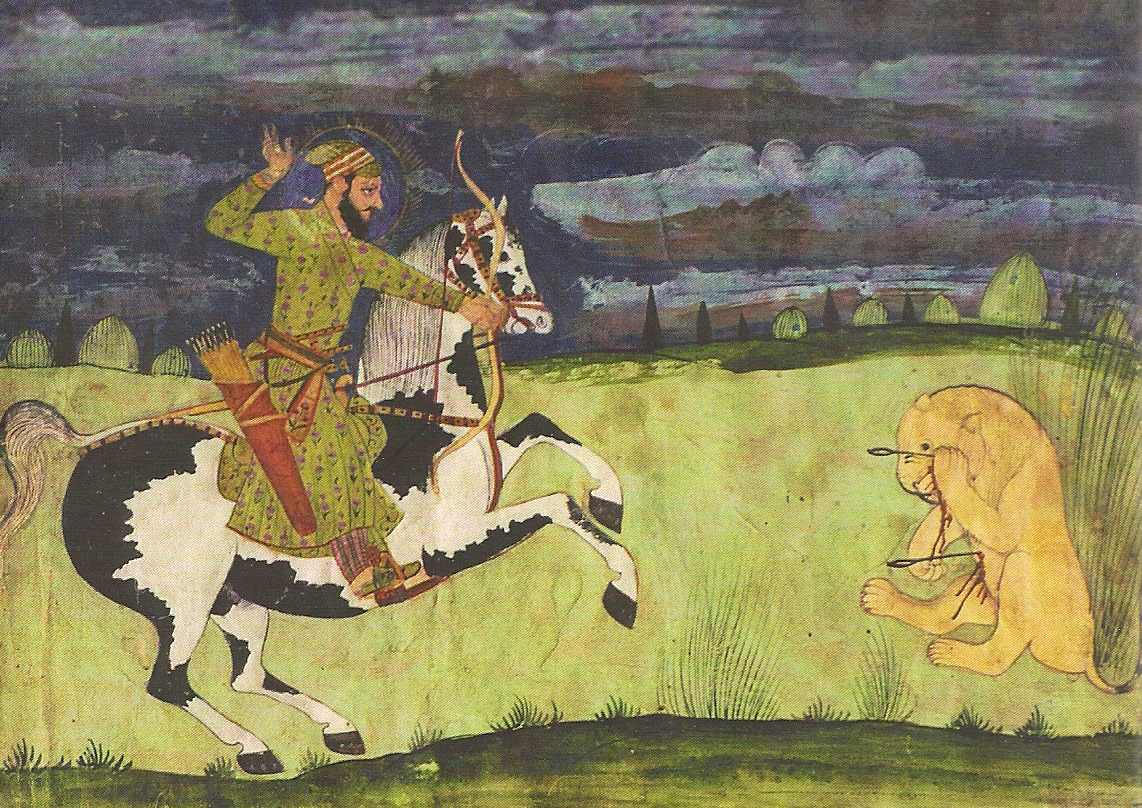
Contemporary depiction of Guru Gobind Singh hunting an Asiatic lion

Jains are strictly lacto-vegetarian as it is a sin to kill any animal including a beetle or an ant.

The majority of Sikhs believe that in Sikhism, eating meat is left up to the individual's conscience, which should be Jhatka as practiced in most Indian cultures. Khushwant Singh also notes that most Sikhs are meat-eaters and decry vegetarians as daal khorey (lentil-eaters). Sikh scriptures however, promotes eating conscious Vegetarianism for spiritual awareness and having less impact on environment. Sikh who take Amrit are vegetarians. The food served in gurudwaras is invariably vegetarian in order to accommodate all sections of society. Although Halal and Kosher slaughterings are banned for Sikhs.

On the views that eating vegetation would be eating flesh, first Sikh Guru Nanak states:

ਪਾਂਡੇ ਤੂ ਜਾਣੈ ਹੀ ਨਾਹੀ ਕਿਥਹੁ ਮਾਸੁ ਉਪੰਨਾ ॥ ਤੋਇਅਹੁ ਅੰਨੁ ਕਮਾਦੁ ਕਪਾਹਾਂ ਤੋਇਅਹੁ ਤ੍ਰਿਭਵਣੁ ਗੰਨਾ ॥

O Pandit, you do not know where did flesh originate! It is water where life originated and it is water that sustains all life. It is water that produces grains, sugarcane, cotton and all forms of life.

— First Mehl, AGGS, M 1, p 1290.

Ahimsa for the Jains is a code of practice to always be kind and compassionate and prevent hurt to oneself and others. Sikhs reject Ahimsa. There are occasional references to Jainism in the Guru Granth Sahib and other Sikh texts.

=== Asceticism ===
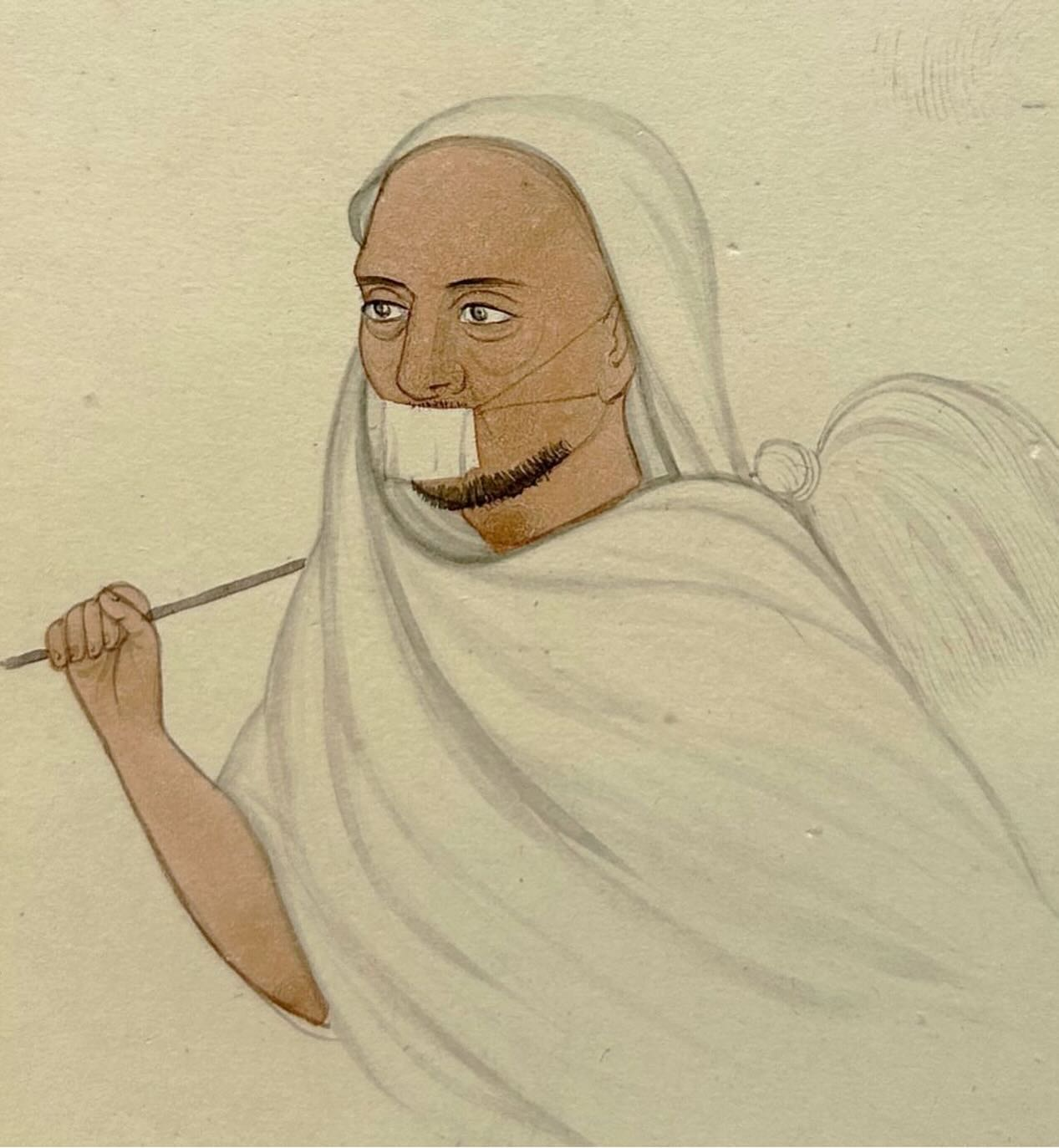
Detail of a painting of a Jain monk, by the Sikh artist Kapur Singh, Punjab, c. 1860–1865

Sikhism rejects asceticism. The Gurus lived as householders. On asceticism Guru Nanak stated:

Asceticism doesn't lie in ascetic robes, or in walking staff, nor in the ashes. Asceticism doesn't lie in the earring, nor in the shaven head, nor blowing a conch. Asceticism lies in remaining pure amidst impurities. Asceticism doesn't lie in mere words; He is an ascetic who treats everyone alike. Asceticism doesn't lie in visiting burial places, It lies not in wandering about, nor in bathing at places of pilgrimage. Asceticism is to remain pure amidst impurities. (Suhi)

Jain community is a fourfold order of male monastics (muni), female monastics (aryika) and householder (Śrāvaka and Śrāvika)

=== Other practices ===
A Sikh is bound to the Truth at all times and practices god Consciousness through Naam Simran and selfless service (Sevā). Jains, too, place high regard in prayers and meditation.

Sikhs reject the caste system and promote social and gender equality, as the soul is the same for both men and women. All are equal in the eyes of God. God is accessible without priests or a middle person. Sikhs and Jains, like Hindus, are expected to be tolerant of all faiths and do not believe that any one path has a monopoly on the Truth. There are many paths to seek out the Love of God and incur Divine Grace. In fact to call another's path inferior is a sign of ignorance and intolerance. Both personal devotion and communal prayers are a part of Sikh's way of life.

== Politics and war ==
The Jain dharma states that one must be completely differentiated from worldly objects like politics and war and that these should be avoided. No joining the army and no killing of any sort, unless it is absolutely necessary. One incident from the Rajasthan State of India shows a Jain praying in the midst of a war and when asked about the meaning of praying while simultaneously killing, he replied, "The killing is for the protection of the state. The prayer is for the protection of the soul." Jainism permits participation in wars, but only for self defence. Starting a war is considered a sin. This is the reason that all the Tirthankaras were princes of kingdoms and is symbolic that politics has no meaning.

The 27th Hukam of Guru Gobind Singh Ji states: Maintain independent rule. "In the affairs of governing, do not give the power of religious authority to others, bow your head to the Khalsa and no other state" like the Mughals, Afghans, Sikh Empire, India, Pakistan, etc. The 30th Hukam of Guru Gobind Singh Ji states: "Train in the skills of weaponry and horsemanship" this reiterates the fact that each Khalsa is a fauj or army, if an oppressor is killing others the Khalsa are like policeman and will fight them. Guru Hargobind Sahib Ji fought against Shah Jahan and Jehangir and Shah-I-Shenshah Guru Gobind Singh Ji fought against Muhammad Azam Shah and Wazir Khan of Sirhind who oppressed innocents.

== Concept of God ==
Jains do not believe in the concept of a God head responsible for the manifestation of the Creation. They believe the universe is eternal, without beginning or end, and that all happens in an autonomous fashion with no necessity of a coordinator/God.

Sikhism is a monotheistic religion, believing in the singular power of the Formless Creator God, Ik Onkaar, without a parallel.

== Customs ==
During the 18th century, there were a number of attempts to prepare an accurate portrayal of Sikh customs. Sikh scholars and theologians started in 1931 to prepare the Reht Maryada—the Sikh code of conduct and conventions. This has successfully achieved a high level of uniformity in the religious and social practices of Sikhism throughout the world. It contains 27 articles. Article 1 defines who is a Sikh:

Any human being who faithfully believes in:

- One Immortal Being,
- Ten Gurus, from Guru Nanak Dev to Guru Gobind Singh,
- The Guru Granth Sahib,
- The utterances and teachings of the ten Gurus and the baptism bequeathed by the tenth Guru, and who does not owe allegiance to any other religion, is a Sikh.

Fasting is an accepted practice for the Jains. A Sikh will eat to partially satisfy the hunger at all times.

Where the Guru Granth Sahib is present, that place becomes a Gurdwara. The focal point of worship in a Gurdwara (the gateway to God) is the eternal teachings of Guru Granth Sahib -the Shabad (Word) Guru.

Jains exhibit the statues of their Tirthankaras in their temples. Special shrines in residences or in public temples include images of the Tirthankaras, who are not worshiped but remembered and revered; other shrines house images of deities who are more properly invoked to intercede with worldly problems. Daily rituals may include meditation and bathing; bathing the images; offering food, flowers, and lighted lamps for the images; and reciting mantras in Ardhamagadhi, an ancient language of northeast India related to Sanskrit.

Jainism express non violence in thought, word and action. Sikhism seeks peace; when all other means have been exhausted then they find it justifiable to draw the sword against oppression and injustice. Jains believe a peaceful way can always be found, perhaps sometimes after tremendous effort. War or violence against humans or animals is never justified.

== Karma and salvation ==
Both Jains and Sikhs believe in the Karma theory and re-incarnation of the soul.

Salvation for a Sikh is attained through the Divine Grace and Will of Waheguru (God) and through good deeds in one's life and the selfless service of Sewa and charity. Jains too believe in personal effort and aims and do not depend on a heavenly being for assistance. Both believe in the conquest of the mind through control of the passions through the five senses as the path to ending the cycle of sufferance of birth and death.

== Symbols ==
The Sikh ☬ made out of three weapons the Khanda Kirpan and Chakram.

The Sikh Ik Onkar meaning God is one

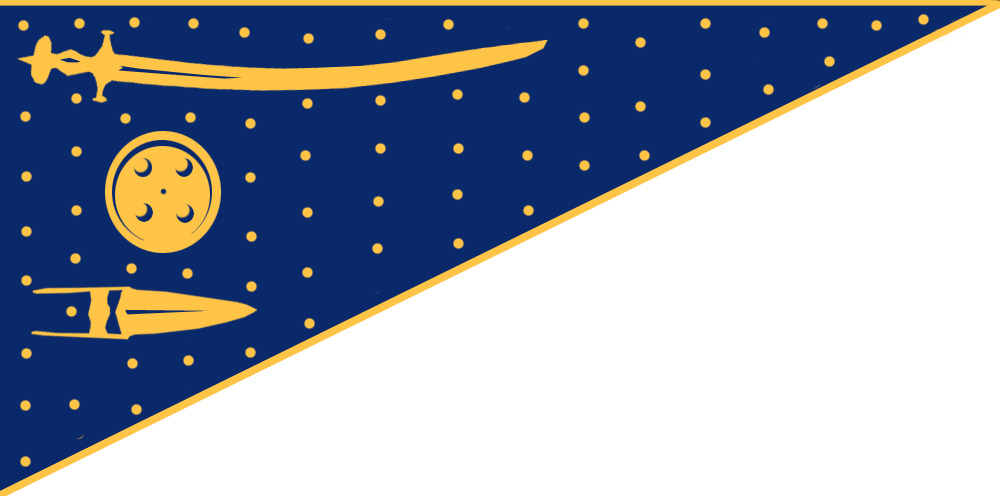
Sikh Nishan Sahib made out of three weapons, the Kirpan, Dhal and Katar used by Guru Gobind Singh Ji

Swastika

Jain Om

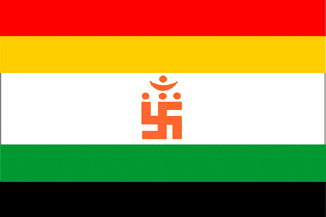
The Jain flag with the Swastika

== See also ==
- Jainism and Hinduism
- Sikhism and Hinduism
- Islam and Sikhism
- Islam and Jainism
- Khalsa
