= Jahaz Haveli =

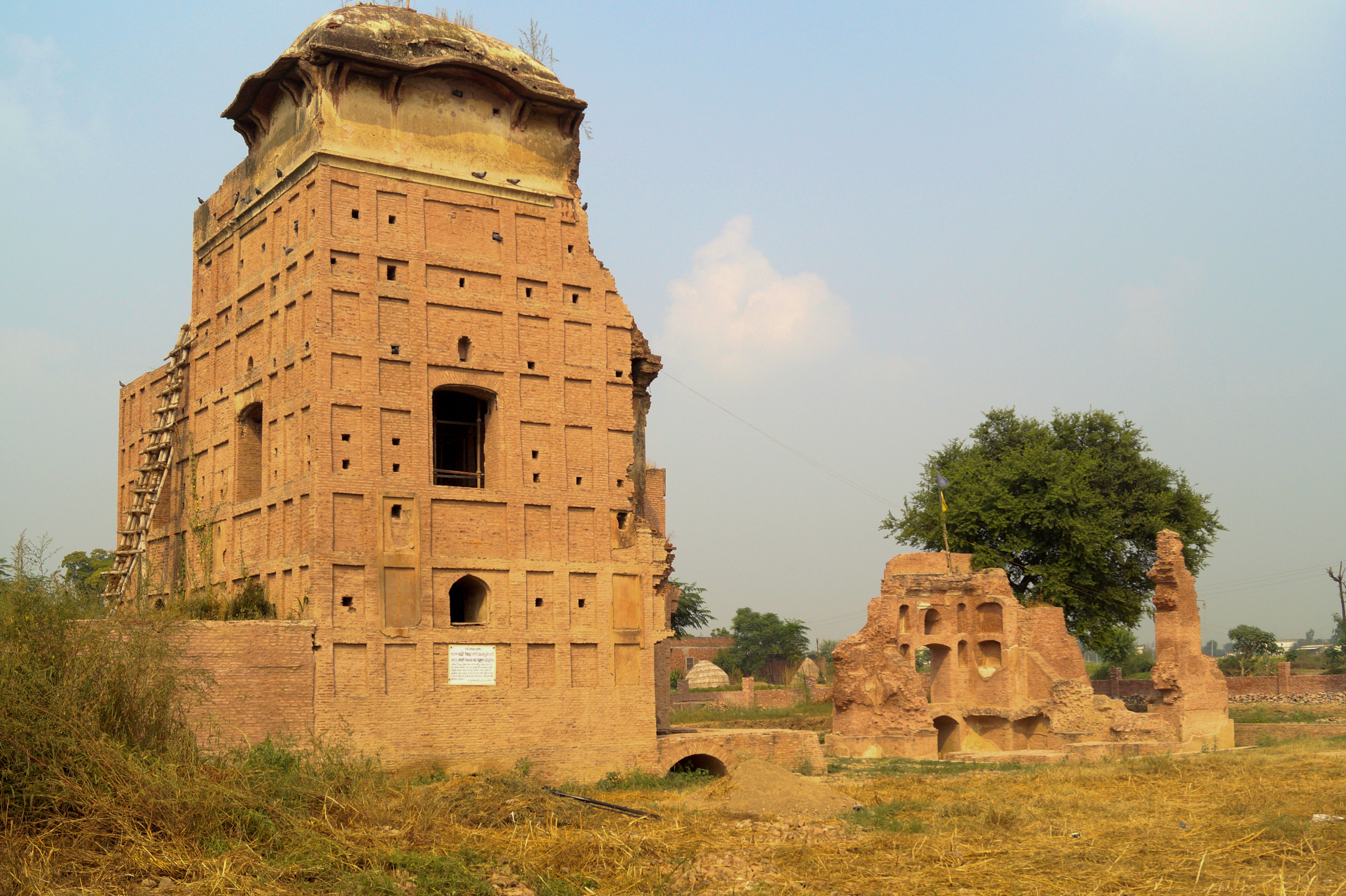
- Jahaz Haveli
- Former names: Jahaz Mahal
- Alternative names: Haveli Todar Mal

General information
- Type: Haveli
- Location: Fatehgarh Sahib, Punjab, Harnam Nagar
- Completed: 17th century
- Owner: SGPC

The Haveli Todar Mal popularly known as Jahaz Haveli or Jahaz Mahal is the 17th century residence (haveli) of a wealthy Jain merchant Todar Mal, who became the diwan in the court of Nawab Wazir Khan, the Governor of Sirhind, under Mughal Empire. Today, it is remembered for the cremation of young martyred sons of Guru Gobind Singh and his mother.

The haveli is situated in Harnam Nagar, on the Eastern side of Sirhind-Rupnagar Railway Line just 1 km away from Fatehgarh Sahib, and is now being taken over and restored by SGPC with the help of Punjab govt and INTACH.

== Architecture ==
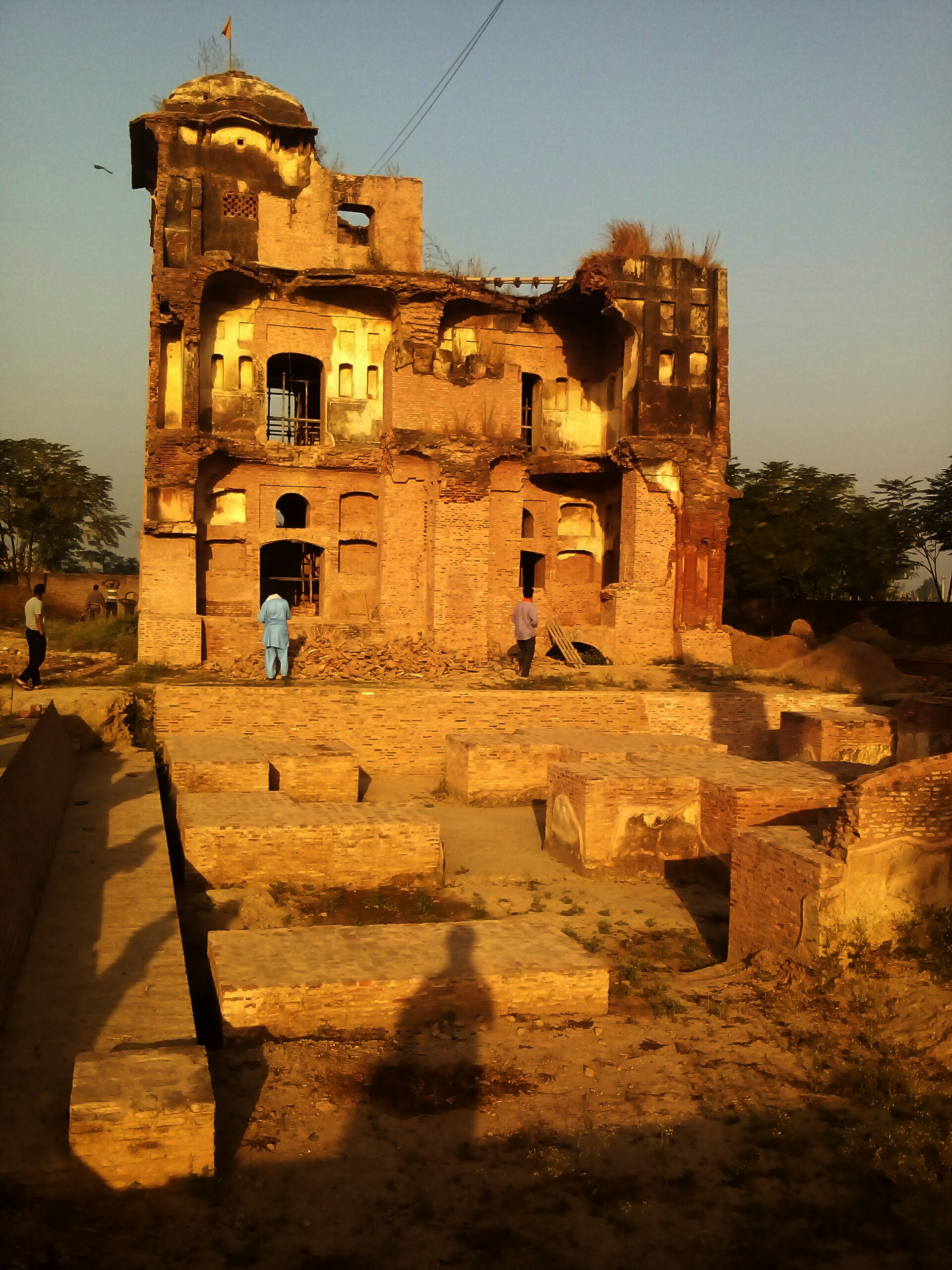
Jahaz Haveli being restored

The haveli was constructed with Sirhindi bricks and stands just outside the Mughal Governor Nawab Wazir Khan's palace, which boasts a grand reception area to receive and entertain guests and a well laid-out ground complete with a pool and fountains.

== Diwan Todar Mal ==
Diwan Todar Mall Jain Hall in Gurudwara Fatehgarh Sahib

In Sikh history, Diwan Todar Mal, an Oswal Śvetāmbara Jain, is remembered for buying a small piece of land at a very huge price saying the world's costliest land ever bought for the cremation of the dead bodies of Mata Gujri, the mother and Sahibzada Zorawar Singh and Baba Fateh Singh, the two younger sons of 10th Sikh Guru, Guru Gobind Singh in 1704 A.D, by paying an exorbitant price to the Wazir Khan 'Governor Of Sirhind'. He had to cover the whole piece of land with gold coins (ashrafis) in a vertical position, as he was asked to vertically place gold coins on the land and only that much land was given to him which he could cover with gold coins. He later also made arrangements for their cremation. But, according to Dr Harjinder Singh Dilgeer, the bodies of all the three were cremated by the descendants of Todar Mall Shahjahani because the latter had already died in 1665–66.

Todar Mal, however had to bear the brunt of Wazir Khan's wrath, and he and his family had to abandon the haveli soon after, and themselves faded into oblivion, with dilapidated building being their only reminder. In the coming years, the haveli fell into rapid disrepair, and collapsed at many place. Though it survived ransacking of Sirhind by Banda Bahadur and during the reign of The Sikh Confederacy, the haveli was left untouched out of respect for Diwan Todar Mal.

== See also ==
- Aam Khas Bagh
- Saka Sirhind
- Ahmad Sirhindi
- History of Sirhind

== Gallery ==
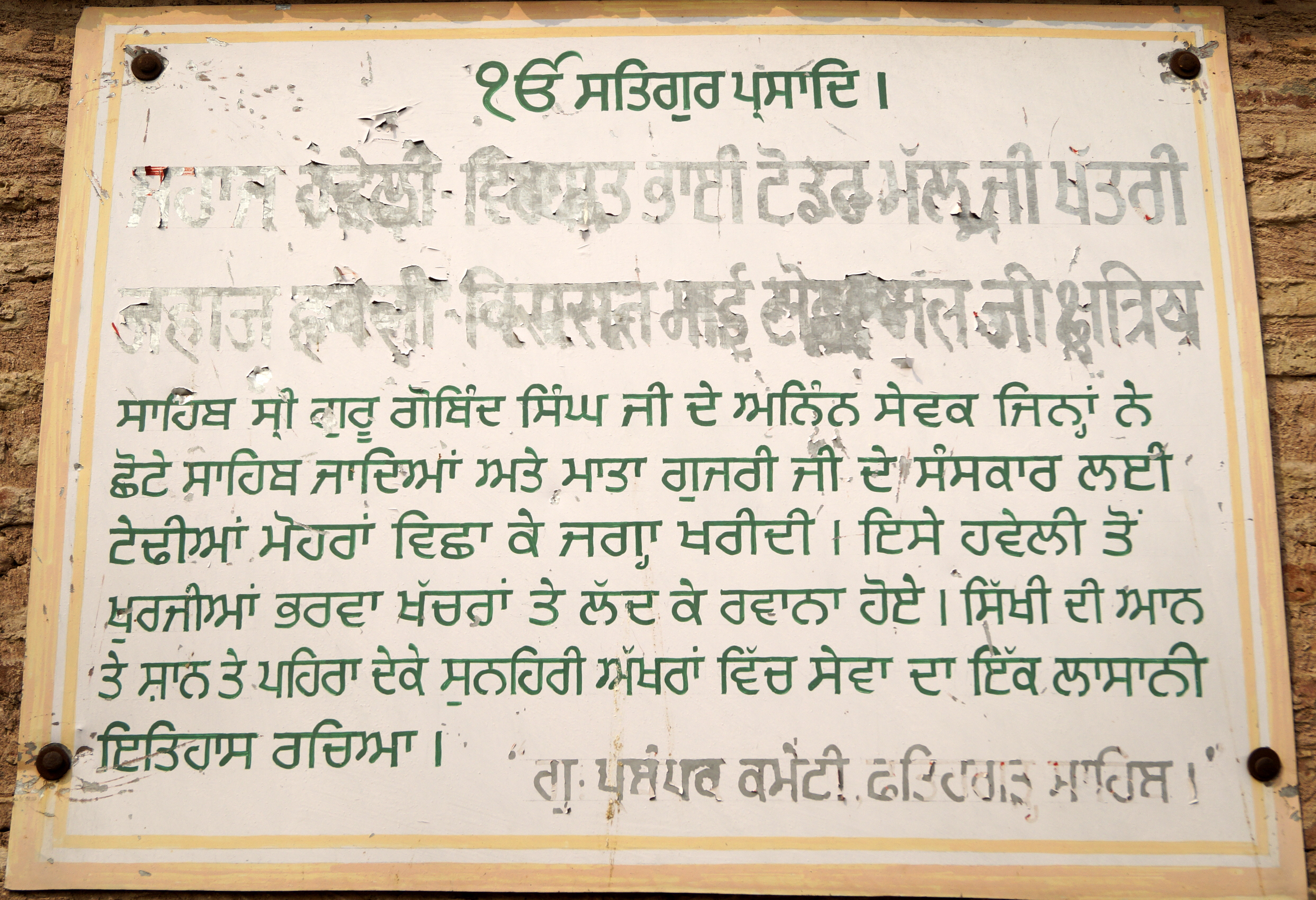
Brief description of history of Haveli Todar Mal, Fatehgarh Sahib district, Punjab, India

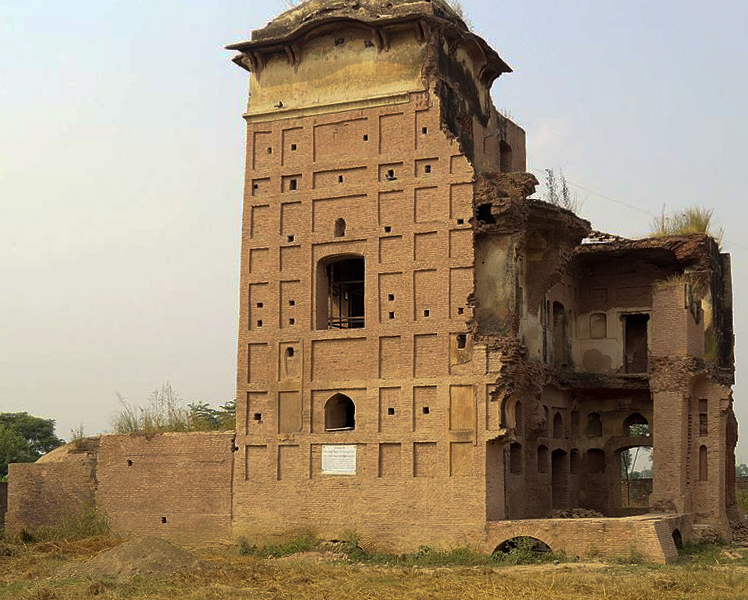
Haveli Todar Mal, Fatehgarh Sahib district, Punjab, India

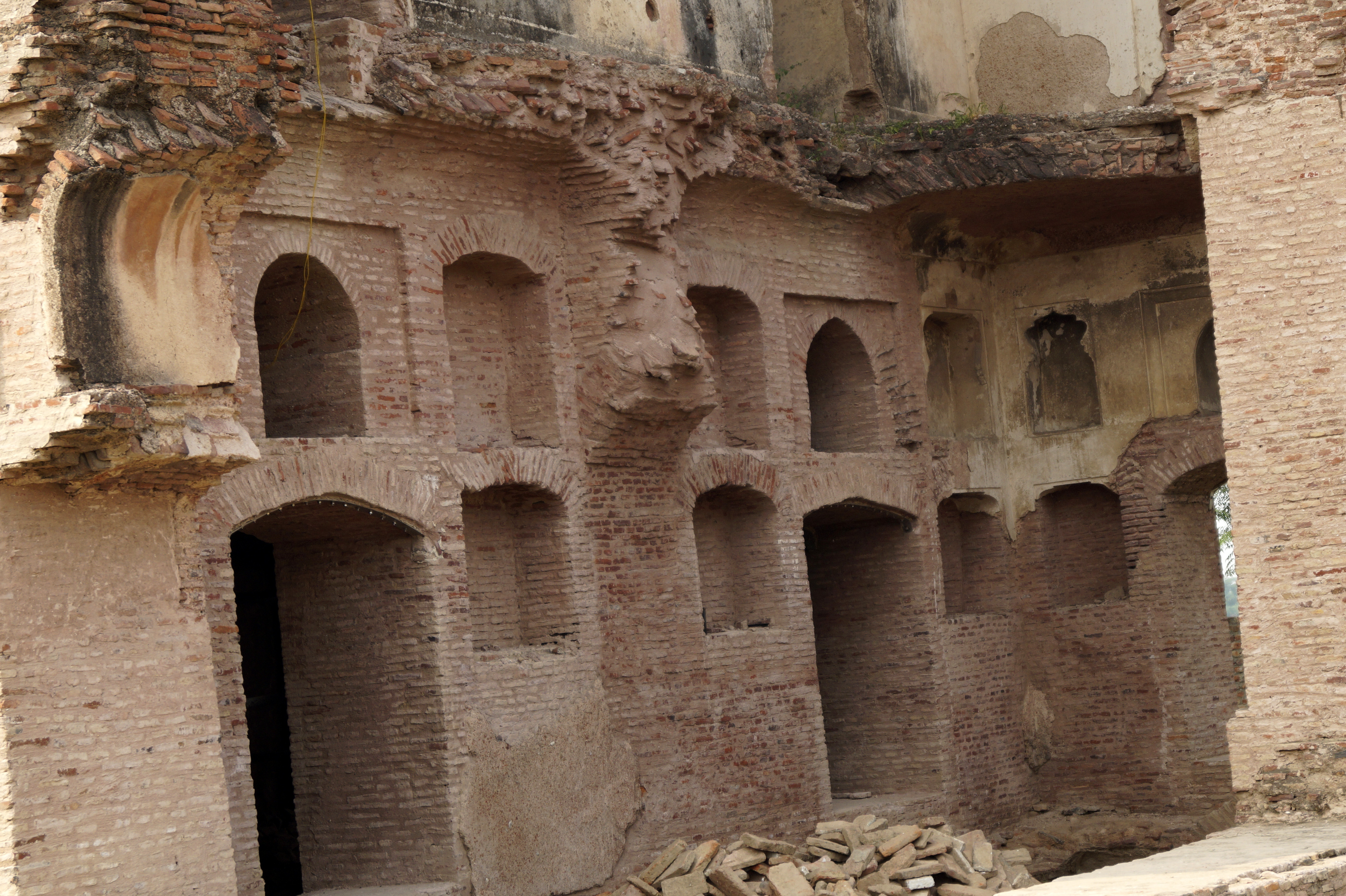
Ruins of Haveli Todar Mal, Fatehgarh Sahib district, Punjab, India

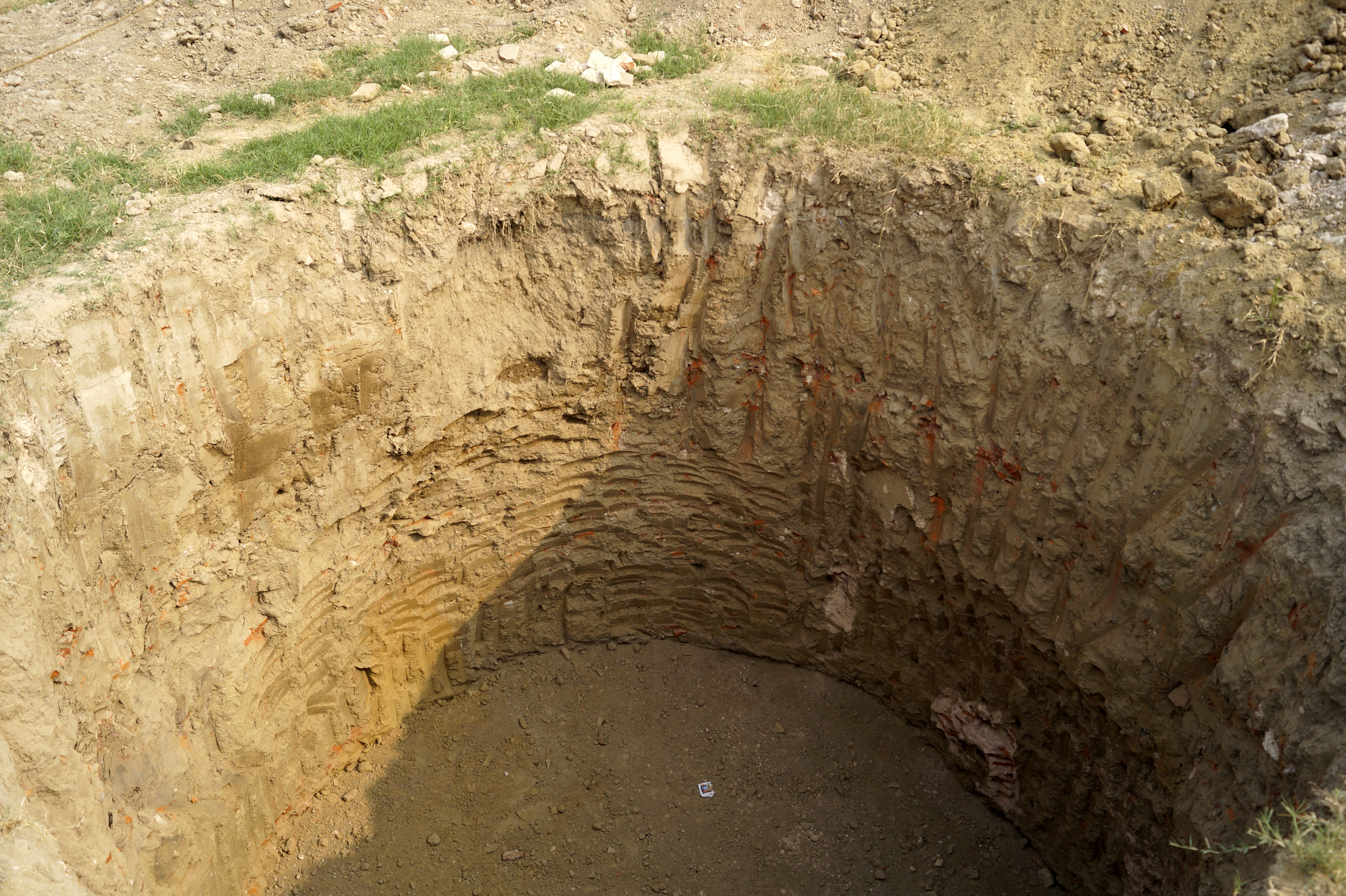
Well at Haveli Todar Mal, Fatehgarh Sahib district, Punjab, India
