= The Punjab Chiefs =

Book on prominent Punjabi chiefs and families

The Punjab Chiefs is a work by Lepel Griffin documenting the prominent chiefs and families of Punjab that possessed rank, wealth, or influence. It was originally published in 1865 under the title The Punjab Chiefs; Historical and Biographical Notices of the Principal Families in the Territories under Punjab Government. Sources Griffin used to compile the work were history sheets, records of the Sikh Empire, records of the British agencies of Delhi and Ludhiana (1809–45), records of the British agency of Lahore (1846–49), records of the Punjab Government (1849–65), interviews with the chiefs, family priests, and bards, and English, Persian and Urdu historical accounts, travelogues, and memoirs. The original edition only covered the families and chiefs living between the Beas and Indus rivers (Lahore and Rawalpindi divisions).

== Revised editions ==
Revised editions, which omitted or included families based upon their prevalence in the contemporary society, were published later. The first revised edition was published in Lahore in 1890–91 in two volumes by Charles Francis Massy, with revised pedigree tables published at Lahore in 1899. This second edition expands upon the original work by including families and chiefs from the North-West Frontier, the Pahari states, and much of southeastern Punjab. A third edition by H. D. Craik was published in 1909 and further expands the work by including families and chiefs living in Delhi, Jalandhar, Peshawar, and Derajat divisions and some princely states. A fourth edition revised and updated up to July 1930 by G. L. Chopra was published in 1940. There was also an Urdu translation of the work by Bhagvan Das published under the title Tārīkh-i-Raūsā-i-Puñjāb.

=== Modern editions ===
A modern edition by Bobby Singh Bansal aiming to bring the histories of the families until the modern-age was published in 2020. A second volume of the work is planned. Many families were affected by the 1947 partition of India and no longer reside in their ancestral settlements.

== See also ==
- Panjab Castes
- A Glossary of the Tribes and Castes of the Punjab and North-West Frontier Province
