= Punjab State Archives =

The Punjab State Archives is a state government archive located in Patiala, Punjab, India. It was formerly housed in the Rajindra Kothi at the Baradari Gardens in Patiala but is now housed on the opposite side of the Central Library, near Patiala Court Mall Road. There is also a location of the Punjab State Archives at Puralekh Bhavan, Plot No.3, Sector-38, Chandigarh, India. It is the largest repository of archival material in North India. Its origins can be traced to Maharaja Yadvinder Singh of Patiala.

== Material ==
It is the biggest repository of archival material in North India and contains material from princely states, residency records, Khalsa Durbar records, and other records of British-rule in Punjab. Examples of works contained in the archive include the Guru Granth Sahib, Ain-i-Akbari, and other Persian, Urdu, and Tibetan manuscripts. There are also Gurmukhi texts amongst the collection.

== History ==
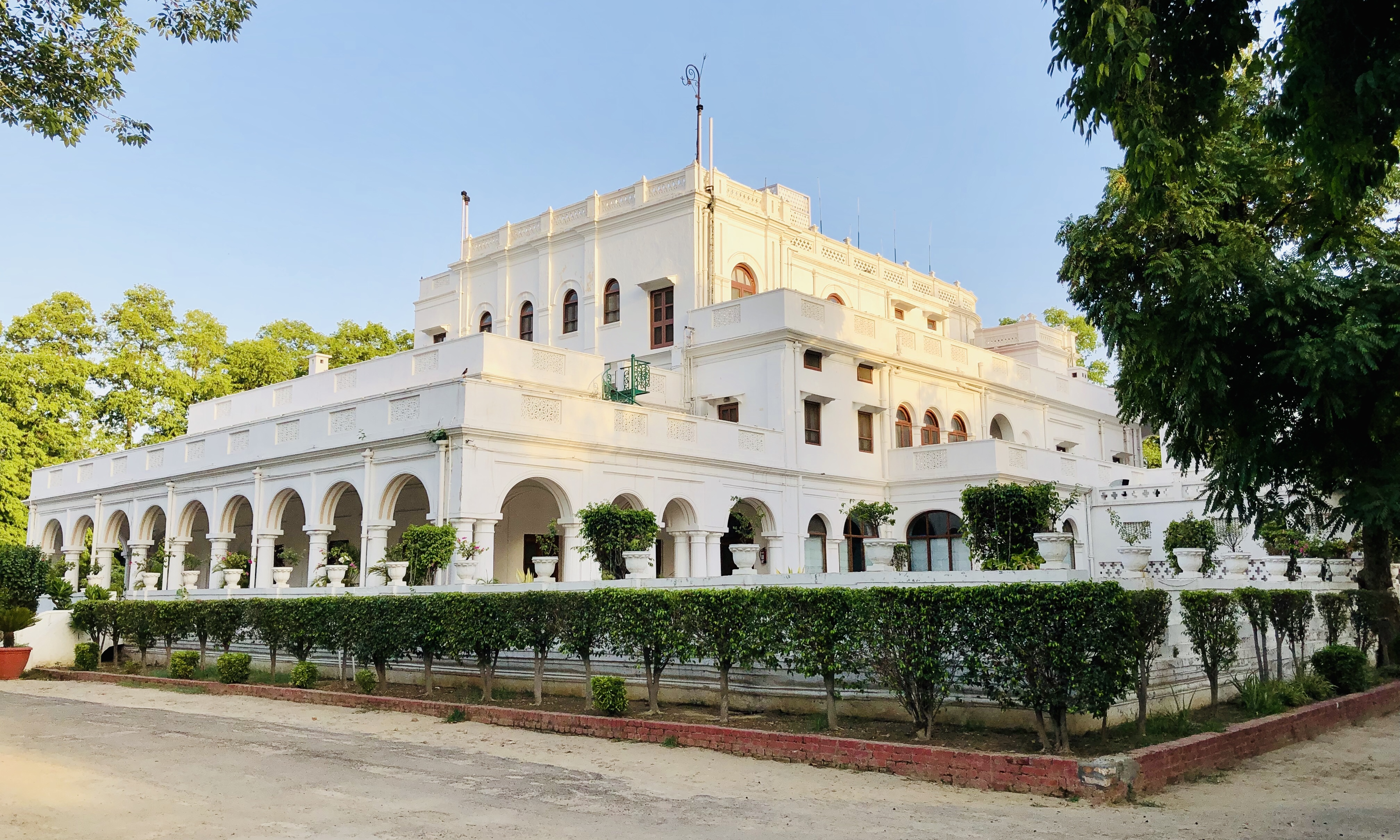
Baradari Palace, former location of the state archives, now a heritage-hotel

The records of the princely states (the erstwhile Patiala, Nabha, Faridkot, Malerkotla, Jind, Kapurthala, Nalagarh and Kalsia states) were formerly housed in the Rajindra Kothi at the Baradari Gardens, where they were looked-after by Ganda Singh under the aegis of Maharaja Yadvinder Singh of Patiala, who was the Rajparmukh of PEPSU. Thus, Ganda Singh served as the founding Director of the Archives at Patiala and was succeeded in his role as director of the archives by V. S. Suri. In 1959, Khalsa Darbar records from the period of Sikh-rule were moved to the Punjab Stale Archives in Patiala.

The Punjab Government later would put the Rajindra Kothi for tender. INTACH attempted to bid but was rejected as it was an Indian entity and the government claimed there would be claims of nepotism if INTACH was allowed to win the tender. In 2003, records were moved to two separate locations within the city by the Patiala Development Authority (P.D.A.). The records were shifted so that the front-portion of the Rajindra Kothi could be turned into a heritage-hotel by the Punjab Urban Planning and Development Authority (P.U.D.A.). Records in the front-rooms/portion of Rajindra Kothi were dumped in the State Languages Department but there was a lack of space to accommodate the sheer amount of shifted records. Meanwhile, the contents of the library of the State Archives that had around 35,000 books was moved to the Reference Library of Punjabi University. The archival records being shifted to the State Languages Department and Punjabi University was done without any cataloguing. It was apparently a temporary measure until a dedicated building for the archival material at Punjabi University is constructed. Some records were kept at the Quila Mubarak complex. S. K. Gupta of Punjabi University claimed some of the records had been damaged during the shifting process.

The Punjab state government claims to have lost documentation and records relating to the Punjabi Praja Mandal movement during the governorship of Amarinder Singh.

== See also ==
- Panjab Digital Library
- Sikh History Research Centre
- Sikh Reference Library
- National Archives of India
- Punjab Archives (Punjab, Pakistan)
