= Khalsa Darbar records =

Records of the Sikh Empire

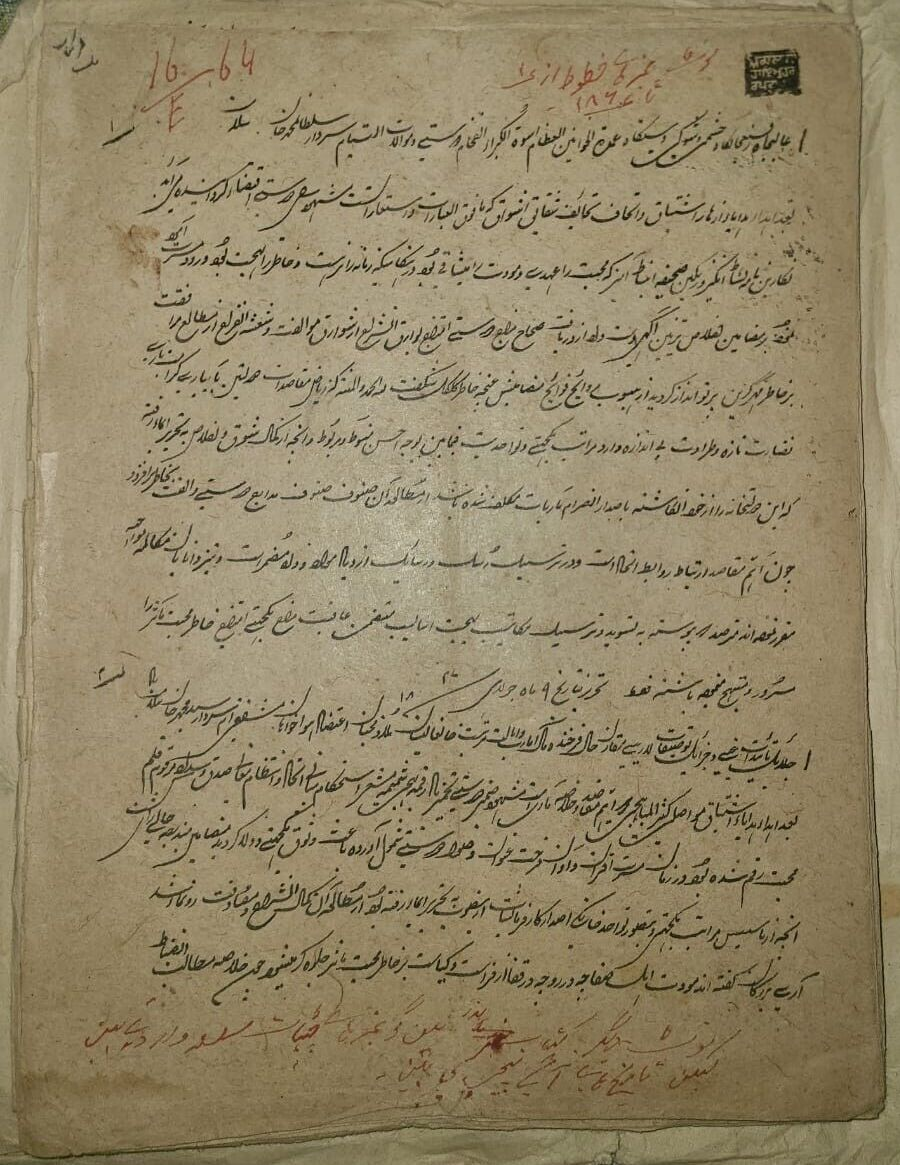
Khalsa Darbar record of the Sikh Empire's Lahore Darbar, concerning various members of Maharaja Ranjit Singh's court, ca.1827–34

Khalsa Darbar records, also known as Lahore Darbar records, refers to the official government documents produced by the Sikh Empire's administration in India and Pakistan (which was referred to as the Khalsa Darbar or Lahore Darbar). The records cover various aspects of the state, such as civil, military, and revenue administration.

== Dating ==
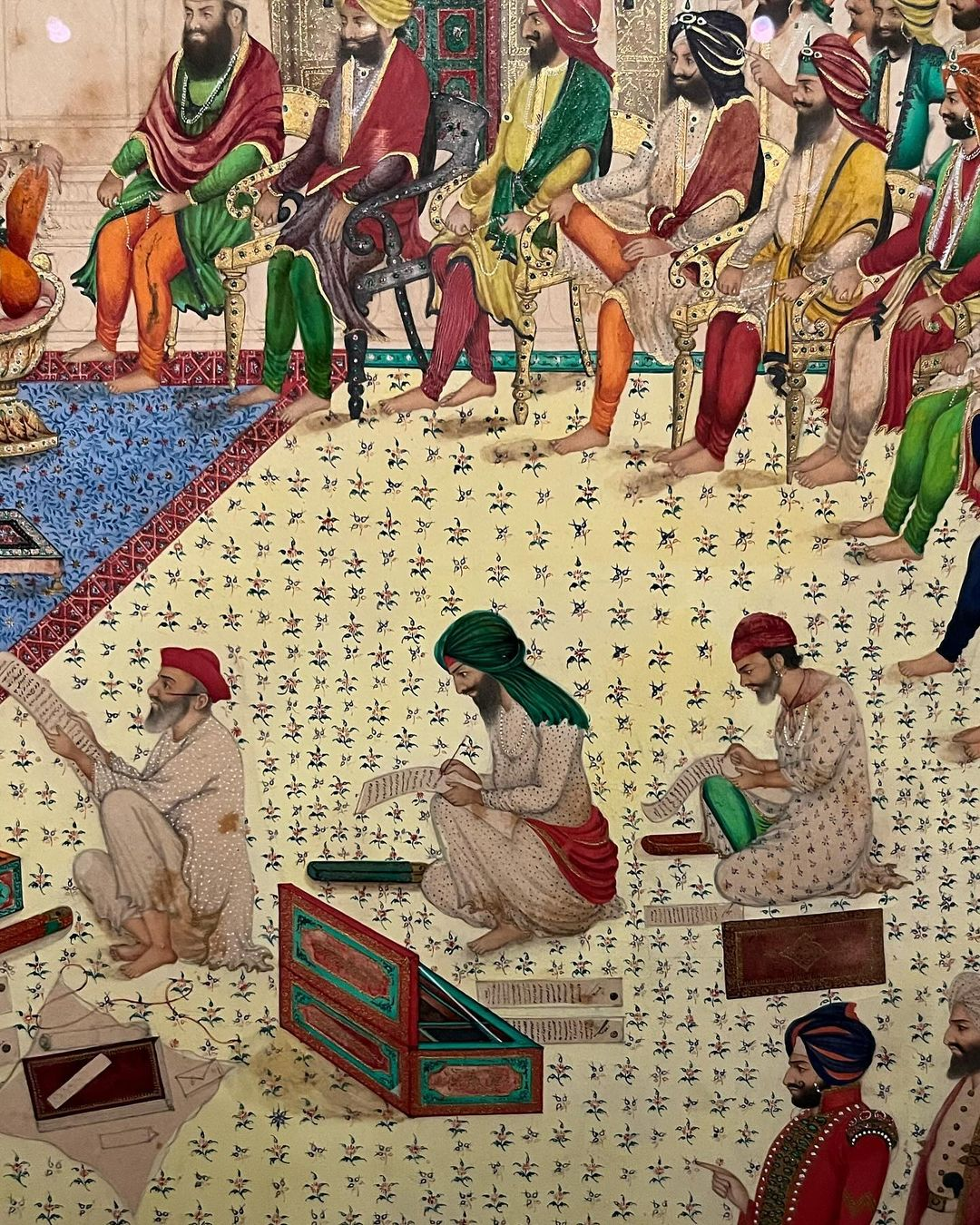
Detail of a painting of the royal court of Maharaja Ranjit Singh, by Bishan Singh, ca.1863–64. Court chroniclers can be viewed scribing down Khalsa Darbar records.

The extant records covers the years 1811–1849 (Samvat 1868 to Chet 1906 B.S.), covering a period of 38 years, though the Pakistani government claims to possess records dating earlier to 1804.

== Classification ==
Much of the extant Khalsa Darbar records relate to the economic/financial management system of the Sikh Empire. The economic-related records can be divided into four categories. Some of the records relate to correspondences and treaties between the British East India Company and the Sikh Empire.

=== Daftar-i-Fauj ===
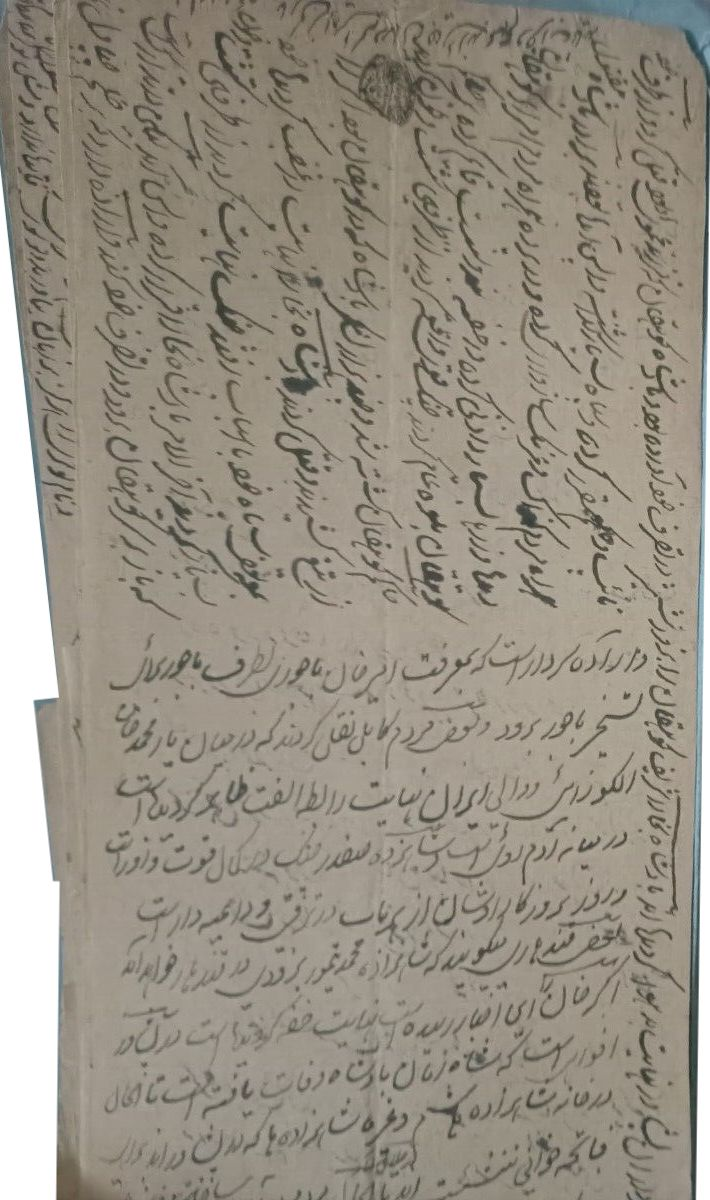
Khalsa Darbar record concerning Sikh victories in Kashmir, Skardu, Peshawar, Kabul and against the Baloch, each folio bearing the seal of Ali Muhammad, ca.1843–44

The Daftar-i-Fauj records relate to the army. This category of records consists of pay-rolls of the cavalry, infantry, and artillery of the Sikh Empire's military forces, from which information can be deduced about the composition and strength of it. Even the salaries of blacksmiths and beldars attached to the military are noted in the records. Conclusions can also be made about the caste-background of the military and the dominance of various castes. For example, until 1813 the military was mainly composed of Hindustanis, Gurkhas, and Afghans, with Jat Sikhs being a smaller element. After 1818, Punjabi Hindus, Sikhs, and Muslims became predominant in the Sikh Empire's military. Membership of the Sikh military was not restricted to any particular caste or class. The records also reveal the names generals, colonels, and commandants of the Sikh military forces. The records reveal that in 1811, the Sikh Empire's military consisted of 2,852 infantry and 1,209 artillery. By 1845, these figures had risen to 70,721 total, with 53, 962 infantry, 6,235 cavalry and 10,524 artillery. The infantry and cavalry was 60 percent composed of Sikhs, 20 percent Muslims, and 20 percent Hindu. The artillery regiments were dominated by Muslims, with some being commanded by European officers. The total military expenditure amounted to 12,796,482 rupees, which was around a third of the annual revenue of the empire. The records note the date of transfers from one military unit to another, and removals by death, desertion, or dismissal. The pay-roll records and the jama' kharch (income and expenditure) records reveal the expenditures for the three branches of the military but also notes the income from rents of shops in regimental bazaars, revenue earned from selling the property of men dying without heirs, and a return of the in'ams or awards bestowed upon infantry officers on the occasions of Dussehra and Diwali.

Salaries for positions within the Sikh Empire's military based upon the Khalsa Darbar records
Position	Monthly salary range (in rupees)
Commandant	60–150 rupees
Adjutant	30–60 rupees
Major	21–25 rupees
Subedar	20–30 rupees
Jemadar	15–22 rupees
Havildar	13–15 rupees
Naik	10–12 rupees
Sergeant	8–12 rupees
Sepoy	7–8 rupees

=== Daftar-i-Mal ===
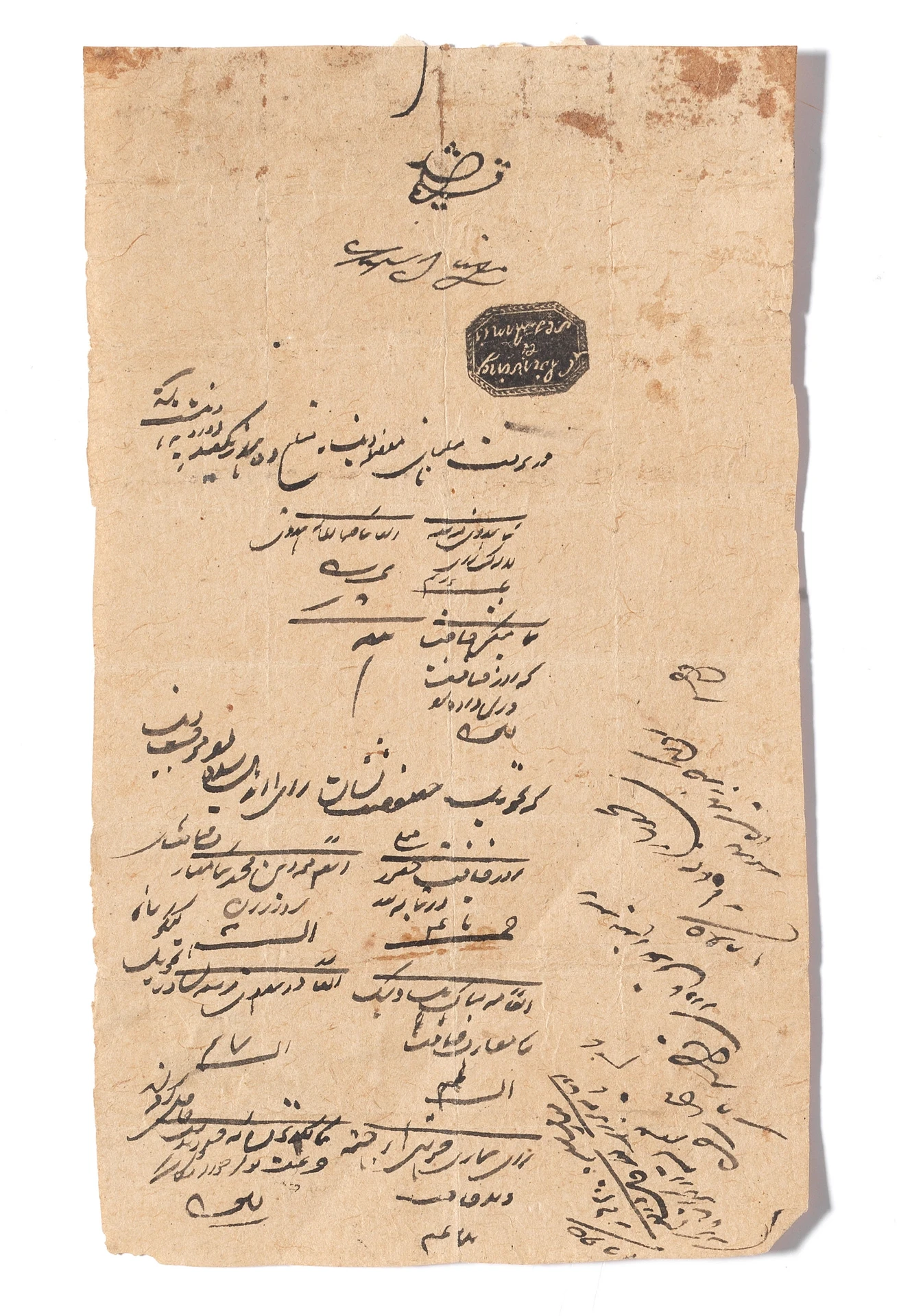
Khalsa Darbar record of the Sikh Empire, concerning payments issued by Maharaja Sher Singh

The Daftar-i-Mal records relate to the revenue department. They can be further subdivided into three sub-categories:

- Awarja – receipts and disbursements
- Tauzihat – adjustments
- Roznamcha – the day-book of disbursements

The Sikh system of collecting revenue and maintaining accounts was well-developed, including the royal expenditures. From these records, information can be obtained regarding the reorganization of administrative sub-divisions of the polity, namely the taluqas, detailing the districts and their subdivisions. Within each taluqa of the Sikh Empire, a general summary settlement was produced, recording the total area of cultivable land and the liabilities and rights of the landlords over the paying tenants. The names of the kardars (governors) of the administrative divisions are noted, as well as the per annum state revenue from various sources.

=== Daftar-i-Toshakhana ===
The Daftar-i-Toshakhana records relate to the royal wardrobe and the maharajas' privy purse. Inventories of confiscated properties and treasures are recorded in them. Corrupt officials had their immorally obtained wealth taken away from them.

=== Jagirat ===
The Jagirat records relate to the jagirs' accounts. Jagirs of various kinds were bestowed upon or assigned to civil and military officers but also religious figures and shrines. Many of the extant Khalsa Darbar records are in the form of dharmarth (charity) grants.

== Language ==
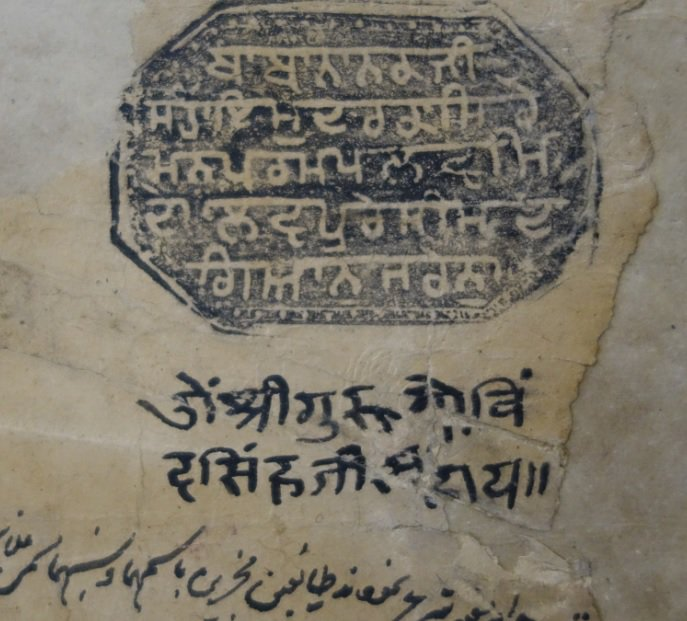
Detail of a stamp mark made by a Gurmukhi seal, from a folio of a Khalsa Darbar record of the Sikh Empire

The Khalsa Darbar records were written in Persian (Farsi). The fact they were written in Persian makes them difficult to decipher in the present-age. An additional difficulty is that they were written in a form of Persian fast-running-hand known as shikasta. There are also limited "incursions" of Gurmukhi in the records. The documents were written in Persian as the Sikh Empire was a highly Persinate entity, showing aspects of continuity but also change in the tradition of administrative writing.

== Publication ==
Much of the collections of the Khalsa Darbar records were catalogued and published by Sita Ram Kohli in two volumes in 1919 and 1927, respectively. Sita Ram Kohli studied 300,000 Khalsa Darbar records, from between the years 1811–1849, that were tied-up with red-cloth in bundles at the Tomb of Anarkali in Lahore. His published catalogues of these records includes the name of the department, date, and a brief reference to the subject-matter in each case. The first volume of Catalogue of Khalsa Darbar Records by Sita Ram Kohli was published in 1919 and sums-up the records of the military department (Daftar-i-Fauj). The second volume, published later in 1927, covers the revenue records.

== Collections ==
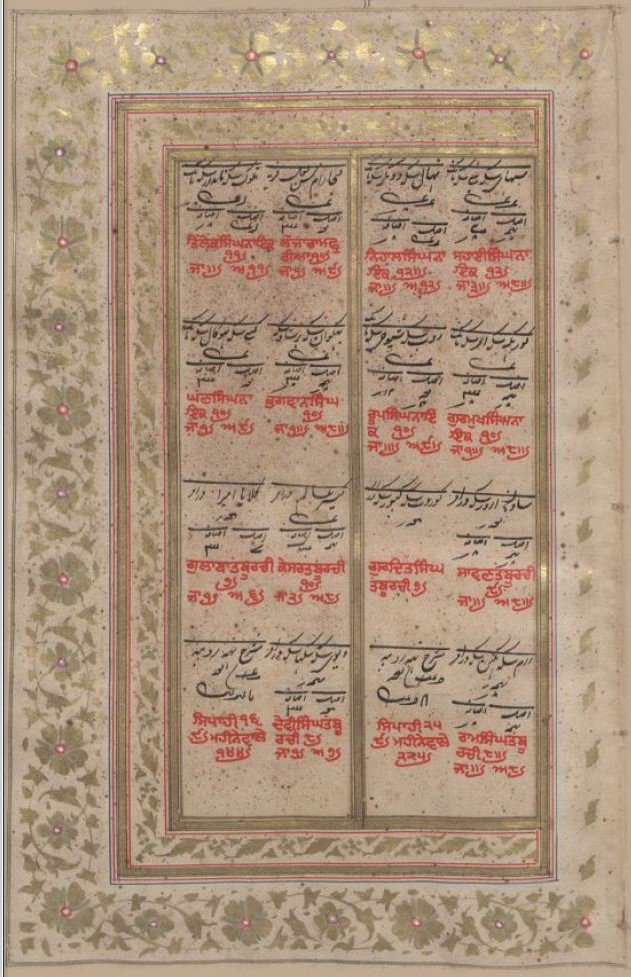
Khalsa Darbar record of a financial account related to the Sikh Army, the folio is elaborately illuminated and decorated, dual-usage of Gurmukhi and Perso-Arabic scripts can be witnessed, classified as a Daftar-i-Fauj record

After the Second Anglo-Sikh War and its annexation of the Sikh Empire in 1849, the vast corpuses of Khalsa Darbar records fell into the possession of the British. They were relegated to the storage of the vernacular office in the Civil Secretariat in Lahore. The records remained there untouched until Michael O'Dwyer, the Lieutenant-Governor (1912–19), initiated a project to arrange and classify the records, which was led by Sita Ram Kohli. Kohli spent four years ordering the records. The records consisted of 129 bundles, with some bundles containing several thousand of sheets each. The individual record sheets are composed out of Kashmiri or Sialkoti paper, with the dimensions of the sheets generally being 5"x7.5". A supplement to the record bundles are fifteen manuscripts that are bound in leather, which are copies of the orders issued to various government officials and the sizable correspondence between the Lahore Darbar and the Ambala and Ludhiana political agencies of the British.

=== Pakistan ===
Around 100,000 Khalsa Darbar records are kept in the collection of the Punjab Archives in Lahore. Khalsa Darbar records dating back to 1804 are kept in the Historical Record Office (Anarkali Tomb), with a Microfilming Unit included. The Punjab Archives has in its collection the Akhbar Darbar-e-Lahore, produced between 1835 and 1849, which were the written accounts of the daily court proceedings of the Sikh Empire. Individual documents are on-display in the museum's general gallery. Pakistani scholar Khizar Jawad is currently working on a project to catalogue and translate all of the Khalsa Darbar records kept at the Lahore Museum.

Some records are kept in the Fakir Khana Museum.

=== India ===
After 1947, some of the Khalsa Darbar records were shifted from Lahore to Shimla (then part of East Punjab). In 1959, the records were moved to the Punjab Stale Archives in Patiala. In 1984, they were moved to the Archives Cell of Ram Bagh, Amritsar. The West Bengal State Archives has some Khalsa Darbar records in its collection.

=== United Kingdom ===
The British Library has a collection of Persian manuscripts from the darbar (court) of Maharaja Ranjit Singh.

== Microfilming and digitization ==
Some of the Khalsa Darbar records kept in the Lahore Museum have been digitized. The Panjab Digital Library has digitized some of the records. An Indian project being carried out by Panjab Digital Library to digitize two million records held in the Punjab state archives department, including 2,500 bound volumes of Khalsa Darbar records, was reported to have stalled in April 2016 due to a lack of funds (the records have already been microfilmed).
