= Panjab Digital Library =

Organization digitizing and preserving Punjab's cultural heritage

Panjab Digital Library Revealing the Invisible Heritage of Punjab
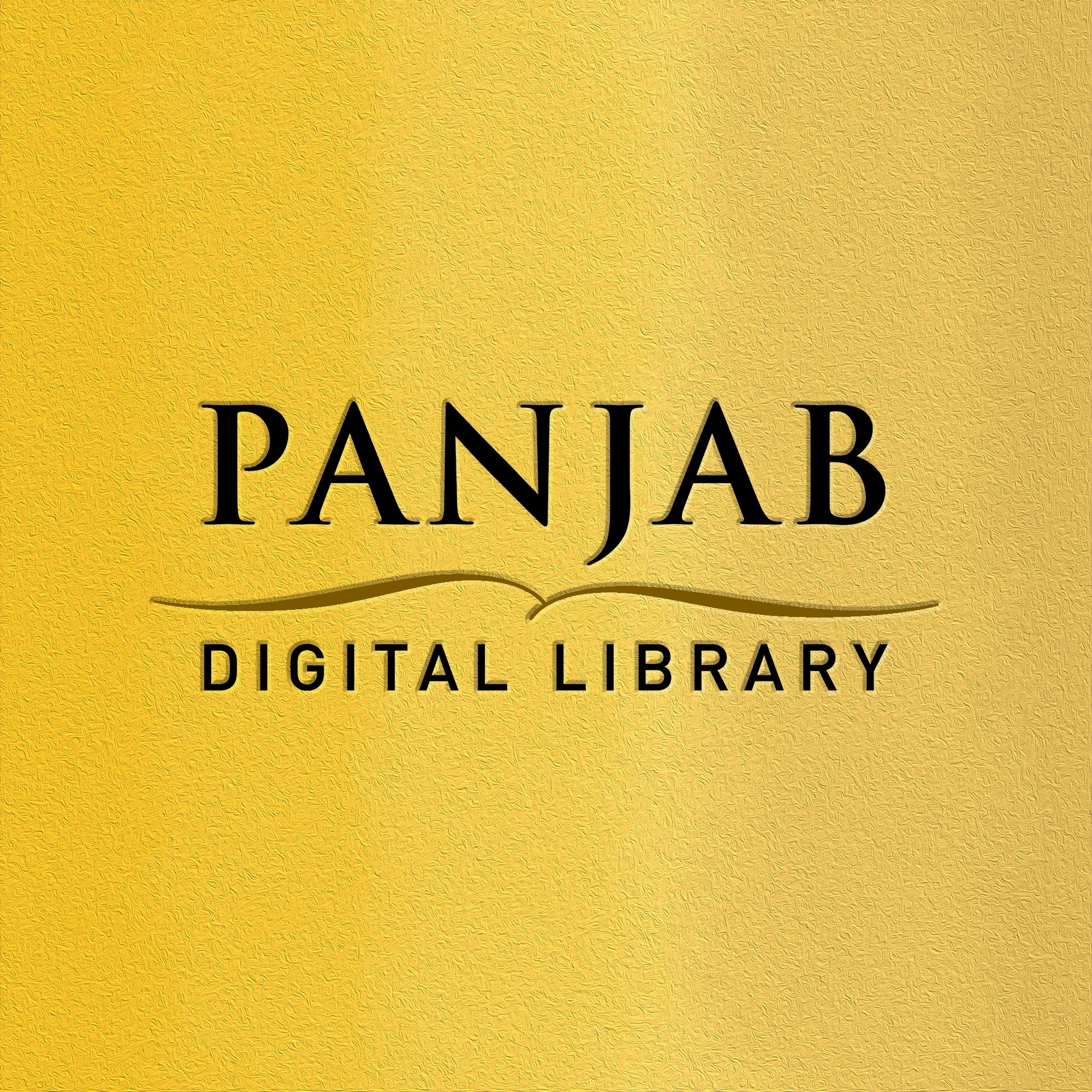
- Location: Plot No. 1, Sector 28-A, Chandigarh, Punjab, India 160027
- Type: Digital library
- Established: 20 April 2003

Collection
- Specialisation: Punjab and Sikhism
- Items collected: Manuscripts, books, photographs, newspapers, magazines, sound recordings
- Size: 1,000,000+ titles, over 100 million pages digitized

Access and use
- Access requirements: Open to anyone with a genuine need to use the collection

Other information
- Director: Davinder Pal Singh
- Parent organization: The Nanakshahi Trust
- Funding: Donations and nominal government payment
- Website: panjabdigilib.org

The Panjab Digital Library (PDL), originally known as the Punjab Virsa Digitisation Initiative (PVDI), is a voluntary organization digitizing and preserving the cultural heritage of Panjab since 2003. With over 100 million digitized pages, it is the biggest resource of digital material on Panjab. There are many historically significant documents stored and made available online. Its scope covers Sikh and Punjabi culture. The library funded by The Nanakshahi Trust was launched online in August 2009. Its base office is located at Chandigarh, India.

The library's mission is to locate, digitize, preserve, collect and make accessible the accumulated wisdom of the Panjab region, without distinction as to script, language, religion, nationality, or other physical condition.

Davinder Pal Singh is the co-founder and the executive director of the Panjab Digital Library, contributing significantly to its mission of preserving Punjab's cultural heritage. It is the biggest online Punjabi resource in the world.

== Name ==
The organisation deliberately spells Punjab in its name as Panjab with an 'a' as Davinder Pal Singh feels the spelling more accurately represents the Punjabi language's phonetics.

== Foundation ==
In 2001, The Nanakshahi Trust was founded at Sahibzada Ajit Singh Nagar, Punjab with the mission of "to develop the Sikh aesthetics and to assist the destitute and downtrodden", working toward the preservation of Sikh artwork and literature for posterity. To achieve this goal, Nanakshahi Trust established the Punjab Virsa Digitisation Initiative programme (PVDI, headed by Surinder Pal Singh), with the project initially being called Online Virtual Library. PDL was founded in Chandigarh on 20 April 2003 by Davinder Pal Singh and Harinder Singh with the motto Revealing the Invisible Heritage of Punjab. Another early figure of the organisation was Jatinder Singh. It was established by The Nanakshahi Trust, having a founding investment amount totalling 10,000 rupees per month. A key factor that motivated the foundation of the body was the loss of heritage related to Punjab and Sikhs due to natural and human causes, such as the destruction of the Sikh Reference Library in Amritsar on 7 June 1984, the loss of material due to inadequate storage, and the ongoing phenomenon of Sikh manuscripts deliberately being burnt on pyres for religious reasons. Sikh heritage had seldom been properly preserved, examples include the destruction of the original Thanda Burj site, the destruction of the original house of Bebe Nanaki (sister of Guru Nanak), and renovations around Takht Hazur Sahib, also the original Zafarnama that Guru Gobind Singh wrote is missing. Many historical gurdwaras were demolished and rebuilt with marble via Kar Seva renovations. Historical manuscripts of Sikh scriptures (birs) were being sent to Goindwal for "cremation". There was no cataloguing, microfilming, or photographic documentation attempt of the collection of the Sikh Reference Library prior to its 1984 content loss. No notable efforts by Sikh or government bodies was being undertaken to safeguard Sikh heritage. More over, Sikh literary collections are widely distributed with no central resource.

As per the organisation, Guru Nanak promoted the study and conservation of the writings of elders. According to PDL, the current epoch is the transition of knowledge from paper to digital medium, with there being a period of fifty years to transfer the knowledge in paper to digital before whatever has not been migrated is permanently lost. As per Panjab Digital Library:

The mission of the Panjab Digital Library (PDL) is to locate, digitise, preserve, collect and make accessible the accumulated wisdom of the Panjab region, without distinction as to script, language, religion, nationality, or other physical condition

— Panjab Digital Library, website

Between 1994 and 1995, Davinder Pal Singh realised the importance computers could play in documenting and preserving heritage. In 1995, he encountered a printer imported from Japan in Chandigarh and noted that it could store digital images. In 2000, they realised the importance of digitization as a preservation medium. In 2003, he quit his job to pursue the idea, setting up a rented space in 2007 for the project. In November 2005, there were 36 volunteers in Punjab and twelve in the United States (with the US group being led by Harinder Singh). In 2006, there were ten working groups that were digitising 5,000 pages daily. By 2007 the organisation began receiving donations. The library was launched in 2009 with 5 million digitised pages being made available to the public. By 2010, the body had grown to thirty-five working groups, with its pace of digitisation improving from 5,000 pages monthly to 5,000 page daily. By 2011, it had thirty-five working stations or groups. In February 2013, PDL was launched in the United Kingdom with Jagdeep Singh as its local coordinator and with a permanent installation at Sri Guru Singh Sabha Southall. By 2014–2015, the organisation was also active in Canada. In 2014, PDL's head office was located in Mohali. In 2015, a fire at the District Commissioner of Amritsar destroyed all of their records from 1849 to 2015, motivating the organisation in their mission. Its mission has three objectives:

- Addressing heritage loss due to environmental and human causes
- Saving items for future preservation and study
- Connecting individuals globally by providing continued free online access

== Coverage ==
PDL is interested in digitizing anything which is related to the Panjab region but also neighbouring areas (Panjab, Haryana, Himachal, Kashmir, Rajasthan, and Pakistan [especially western Punjab]). It is also interested to digitize anything concerning the Panjab region or in Gurmukhi script lying anywhere in the world. PDL is an archive being presented in the form of a library. It digitizes manuscripts from rural areas with the same vigor as it digitizes government files for posterity. The PDL's philosophy is digitization first, thus some of its collection lacks metadata. They digitise without prejudice on language, politics, or religion. It carries out its work for free by using donations and only accepts payment for government-related projects.

It has digitized 4,500 volumes of the Khalsa Darbar Records of the Sikh Empire, consisting of around 450,000 pages. It has digitized the records of eight princely-states of the Punjab States Agency, namely Patiala, Nabha, Jind, Malerkotla, Faridkot, Kapurthala, Kalsia, and Nalagarh, comprising 650,000 digital files. Furthermore, colonial records from British Punjab are also digitised. It has also digitised items in languages other than English and Punjabi and also maps. Furthermore, gazettes, gazetteers, newspapers, and periodicals such as The Indian Express, The Tribune, Akali Patrika, Ajit, Hind Samachar, Jag Bani, Sant-Sipahi, The Spokesman Weekly, Khalsa Akhbar, Kaumi Ekta, Dit Singh Magazine, Khalsa Dharam Prakashak, and The Sikh Review have also been digitised. It has digitised the records of gurdwara management bodies, such as the SGPC and DSGMC, and also the state governments of Punjab and Himachal Pradesh. The resolutions of the SGPC since 1932 have been digitised. A heavy emphasis is placed on single-copy documents and records which have no copies. All together PDL estimates that the state governments of Punjab and Himachal Pradesh possess 70 million single-copy documents. It has digitised 22 lakh pages of Himachal Pradesh's government archives. The Haryana state government has rejected multiple requests from PDL to digitise their records. PDL believes there are more documents remaining in the areas of former West Punjab (now in Pakistan) than what remained in former East Punjab (now in India). The organisation has around 5,000 qissas in its collection and 65 spy-letters in Marwari from the 18th century that are useful for understanding Punjabi-Mughal relations. The letters from 1711 are by Diwan Bikhari Das. Aside from literature, it also digitises phulkari and bagh designs (more than 900 designs, such as from Peshawar and Malwa), and has digitised over 7,000 miniature paintings. 200 maps have been scanned. It also has documented around 1,000 murals. The body also digitises photographs (over 13,000), such as the pictures taken by Dhanna Singh Chahal. Furthermore, 180 hours of historical interviews have been saved. The project has also digitised legal records relating to the 1984 anti-Sikh riots and the 1986 Saka Nakodar killings. Over 35,000 artefacts have been digitised, mostly phulkaris.

Panjab Digital Library operates abroad, such as in the United Kingdom (incorporated 23 November 2011) and United States. They are also a registered charity in Canada. The data of the library has is used by 50,000 users monthly, with a total of 1.2 million users overall. Its data is backed-up at six locations. The book data is made available in PDF format.

== Methods ==
PDL offers both in-house and on-site digitisation. As per PDL, they digitise the material of a specific institution and then give that data back to the institution so they can maintain and preserve it but PDL also maintains a backup of the digitisation work. The project aims to scan items in their original form, colour, graphics, and texture. The organisation uses a variety of scanning and photography methods with scanners and cameras. A favoured method is the use of an overhead DSLR camera attached with a special lens with good lighting. For phulkaris and large paintings, they have developed a special method (described as jugaad) to digitise it in sections and stich the section images together. The organisation has developed 13 computer programs for its work. The PDL digitises documents without touching the actual item. The organisation also digitises items at the site they are held rather than bringing items to be digitised to their office to carry out the work. They capture an image in both RAW and JPEG formats, after being assigned an accession number in the central resource, with a comparison being conducted to ensure the entirety of the original work was captured by the image.

The organisation adopted the Dublin Core Metadata (DCM) for its digitisations and formulated its own PDL Metadata Schema (PDLMS) based on the DCM. It also developed its own Digital Image Management Software (PDLDIMS) for its specific needs. Data mining is currently only conducted on English literature as there is a lack of mature OCR technology for non-Roman scripts, although Punjabi University (Patiala) is developing an OCR for Gurmukhi. PDL maintains weekly backups of its central data at six locations in three different formats (DVD, hard-drive, and magnetic-tape). Copyright remains with the original owners while the digitised material can be used for educational purposes. PDL has an agreement with the publisher Singh Brothers to show their publications. There are plans to implement artificial intelligence, virtual reality, and big data analytics.

== Funding ==
Most of the funding for the organisation comes from public fundraising and donations but they are paid nominally by the government for work they carry out on behalf of the government. One donation method is the Adopt-a-Book scheme, where a donator chooses a work to be a custodian of and pays for its digitisation. The organisation does not receive any support from Sikh bodies, such as the SGPC. It also receives little government support. The Punjabi diaspora helps support the project.

== Challenges ==
Initially, the main difficulty faced was convincing people and institutions to have their collections or items digitised as it was a new technology, especially in rural Punjab. Since the service is free, some were suspicious of their agenda. Some apprehensions are that custodians want to be paid to have their collections "copied" or they feel they will lose the status of being the sole-custodians of works. Another issue is a prevailing religious belief amongst some Sikhs that once a pothi or bir of Sikh scriptures becomes old and worn, it should be "cremated", which is still practised despite the SGPC pleading that the practise should not be done and such codices be preserved instead. PDL attempts to request to photograph the pages of the manuscripts of Sikh scriptures assigned to be "cremated" with varying degrees of success. Current challenges are lack of funding, loss of material due to deterioration or destruction, and lack of access to high-level technology to assist with the digitisation process. PDL currently has partial permission to digitise 80 million pages but estimated it would take them 40 years to finish scanning them at their current pace. The inks used in some works attribute to their fast deterioration. Thus they are focused on increasing their daily digitisation rate by innovating new methods, hiring more staff, acquiring more space, and buying equipment as they cannot afford high-tech ones.

== Accessability ==
The organisation runs a digital library at panjabdigilib.org, launched on 20 August 2009. It is the first digital library in South Asia. The Panjab Digital Library website was launched with the support of the Sikh Research Institute. The website makes available 700,000 titles with over 65 million pages total. In October 2017, free downloads was introduced to the PDL website initially to allow pamphlets to be downloaded through the support of G. B. Singh of Galaxy Developers. However, the library's website has not been updated due to a lack of funds. Despite this, all records remain available upon offline access or through calling or emailing. Originally the project was associated with the web domain Nanakshahi.org. A new website was launched in June 2026. The legacy (former) website is now hosted at savepanjab.org.

== Management ==
PDL is managed by a board of trustees and directors as a registered trust, including diasporic members.

== Projects ==
=== Background ===
The two objectives of the organisation are both digitisation and improving awareness. The awareness aspect is conducted by hosting exhibitions, helping establishing museums (such as Guru Gobind Singh Museum of Martial Arts at Kapal Mochan), and publishing books. Special focus is placed on reaching and educating the youth on the mission and its importance. In Punjab, items lay in villages, private collections (belonging to bibliophiles, archivists, and scholars), libraries, archives, and museums that were only accessible in person. There are two main sources for its digitisation projects: the villages of Punjab and the region's universities and colleges. PDL notes that the items in village collections tends to be better preserved than items in institutional collections. One reason is that items in institutional collections saw more frequent usage, hastening their deterioration. Another source for digitisation projects are government and private institutions. Sometimes the collections the organisation comes across is by happenchance, such as when the newspaper collection of Giani Ravinder Singh of Burail village was discovered by Davinder Pal Singh and Surinder Singh in the 2000s. As for books, PDL prefers to focus on out-of-print and orphan works. PDL requests owners to donate their not-in-use books for the project.

=== 2000s ===
The first project after the founding of the organisation in 2003 was the digitisation of manuscripts of Anandpur Sahib that were in the collection of descendants of Guru Hargobind (specifically descended from Suraj Mal, including six volumes written by Guru Gobind Singh) using DSLR cameras as they did not have the funds for professional scanning technology. The practice of using cameras instead of scanners continues as a cost-saving measure by innovating methods. They also only digitise items at their site, never taking them to their office to be digitised. The group transmitted the Gyan Ratnavali into a CD format. After the first digitisation project at Anandpur Sahib, they then in 2004 digitised 30 manuscripts formerly belonging in the collection of Man Singh Nirankari (who originally got them from Shamsher Singh Ashok) that were housed at Chandigarh Museum (Government Museum and Art Gallery) under the purview of museum director V. N. Singh. By November 2004, they had completed their digitisation project at Chandigarh Museum. In 2006, the organisation digitized 430 manuscripts in the collection of Kurukshetra University, there was a total of 17,000 manuscripts at Kurukshetra University so PDL trained their staff so they could finish the digitisation work independently. The organisation replicated a Sikh coin issued by Banda Singh Bahadur and designed a trivia game for children called Rabab-e-Punjab. They approached Gurdwara Angitha Sahib in Patiala to document the manuscripts held by it, which Ajmer Singh and Jarnail Singh asceded to by allowing them access. Proposals were sent to Khalsa College and Bhai Vir Singh Sahitya Sadan to digitise their collections. Khalsa College chose to have their collection digitised by a Jalandhar-based private company. The organisation planned to visit Pakistan in June 2006 to digitise the collection of the Lahore Museum and Dyal Singh Library in Lahore. They began digitising the collection of the Languages Department of Punjab on 12 June 2006 and expected to complete the work within a 6-month window. From 2006 to 2008, it digitised 604 manuscripts from Punjab Languages Department, Patiala. It also digitised 29 manuscripts with Chief Khalsa Diwan. In 2007, it digitised 650 manuscripts out of a collection of 800 manuscripts of the Punjab Virasat Charitable Trust, Chandigarh. In 2008, it digitised 36 manuscripts of the Delhi Sikh Gurudwara Management Committee and 300 out of the 435 manuscripts in the collection of the Shiromani Gurdwara Parbandhak Committee. Work began to digitise the SGPC's collection in Amritsar in September 2009, such as at the rebuilt Sikh Reference Library.

=== 2010s ===
In December 2011, it began digitising the collection of Takht Sri Patna Sahib. In January 2012, it digitised manuscripts, coins, letters, and books in the collection of Government Museum and Art Gallery, Chandigarh, which includes 50 manuscripts. In 2013, the organisation was tasked with digitising 60 million pages of files and records of the Punjab state government, from before and after partition. An example are British Punjab-era documents about the compensation paid to victims of the Jallianwala Bagh massacre. In 2013, it digitised rare manuscripts of Sikh scriptures in villages across Maharashtra and Andhra Pradesh. In 2014, the body digitized around 6,000 issues of the Khalsa Samachar periodical. The same year, it started the Mobile Digitization Lab (idea present in 2011) drive to travel around the villages of Punjab to catalogue and digitize private collections by digitizing 400,000 pages every year and prevent rare manuscripts and old books from being "cremated" at Angitha Sahib gurdwaras but the project was unable to be completed due to a lack of funding. Also in 2014, a project to catalogue and curate the organisation's collection of 27,000 photographs, lithographs, and paintings arose. A project being carried out by Panjab Digital Library to digitize two million records held in the Punjab State Archives department, including 2,500 bound volumes of Khalsa Darbar records, was reported to have stalled in April 2016 due to a lack of funds (the records have already been microfilmed). In June 2016, the personal library of Surinder Singh (scholar of Sikh numimastics) was donated to PDL. In 2019, the organisation was involved in the running of a Golden Temple and Sikhism multimedia exhibit in Brampton, Canada.

=== 2020s ===
The organisation remained operation during the COVID-19 pandemic. In 2022, a project to digitise 10,000 coins, mostly historical Punjabi coins, commenced. In January 2025, the PDL launched a drive to digitise 118,000 books held by the Languages Department of the Punjab government.

=== Future plans ===
The PDL plans to implement an oral history project. There are further plans to establish a digital library at every Punjabi college and build 3D images as a record of 93 Punjabi forts. They also plan to expand into Western Punjab, which is part of Pakistan by setting-up a local branch there.

=== Library at Virasat-e-Khalsa ===
PDL signed an agreement with Anandpur Sahib Foundation to develop and manage a library at Virasat-e-Khalsa Museum. PDL plans to establish a library of books related to Panjab's art, culture, and history. Rare manuscripts and old magazines will also become part of it. Amongst all these, newspapers will be kept in a big way. About 15 titles from 1960 onwards will be part of the library. A small library shop to sell interesting books and ephemeral material is also on the agenda. PDL opened this library in May 2016.

=== Digitization projects ===
- Kurukshetra University, digitisation of 6,930 manuscripts and 1,500 books on the request of G. Khurana
- Punjab State Archives, Punjab Archives Department, Patiala. Consisting of a 50-person team digitising 1,000 pages daily with 20,000 manuscripts in the collection.
- Punjab Languages Department, 604 manuscripts digitised
- Chief Khalsa Diwan, 135 manuscripts
- Punjab Virsasat Charitable Trust, around 800 manuscripts and 200 books under the custodianship of Navjot Pal Singh Randhawa
- Punjabi Sahitya Akademi
- Institute of Sikh Studies, Chandigarh
- The Tribune daily, Chandigarh
- Chandigarh Architecture Museum

=== Exhibitions and presentations ===
Since 2005, PDL has organised 20 exhibitions at over 100 locations in India and abroad, including:

- Virsa, two or three day exhibition held during the Prakash Utsav (birth anniversary) of Guru Nanak at the local gurdwara of Sector-34, Chandigarh in November 2005
- Revealing the Invisible Heritage Image of Punjab at Guru Nanak Dev University, 24 June 2008
- Morcha Guru Ka Bagh
- Guru Tegh Bahadar Sahib
- The Khalsa Raj: Banda, Battles & Body Politic focused on Banda Singh Bahadur, held globally from 2010 to 2016
- South-Asian Solidarity and Diversity: Lived Stories, Everyday Lives, beginning in Punjab Kala Bhawan, Sector 16, Chandigarh until 15 July 2013 and being hosted at other places afterwards, possibly the first exhibition to be hosted in a Punjabi village (Daudpur village between 18 – 20 July 2013)
- ‘Emperor-Prophet’: Guru Gobind Singh Sahib at Bihar Museum, Patna, Bihar held for the 350th Prakash Ustav of Guru Gobind Singh, beginning on 30 December 2016 and lasting for a month on behalf of the Government of Bihar
- CII Chandigarh Fair 2017
- Monuments of Punjab: A Study of Art and Architectural Heritage of Medieval Times in Present Punjab held with the Department of History of Sri Guru Gobind Singh College in November 2017
- Punjab in the Mid-Nineteenth Century: Fall of the Sikh Empire and Transition in Polity and Socio-Cultural Milieu (1839-1849) at Sri Guru Gobind Singh College, Chandigarh in March 2018
- IN5 Experium: The Golden Temple of Amritsar, held at the Bramalea City Centre, Brampton, Canada from April 2019 until 15 June 2019
- Exhibition to mark the 550th Parkash Purb of Guru Nanak in November 2019 at Guru Nanak Darbar
- The Sikh Empire (1710-1849): Perspectives of International Artists and Authors at the Patiala Heritage Festival 2026 (Punjab Sakhi Shakti Craft Mela) held at Banasar Ghar, Sheesh Mahal, Patiala (21 February – 2 March 2026)

== Collections digitized ==
=== Major institutions ===
PDL has digitised collections from 25 major institutional libraries and more, including:

- 1. Punjab Languages Department, Patiala
- 2. Government Museum and Art Gallery, Chandigarh
- 3. Beant Singh Memorial, Chandigarh
- 4. Central Reserve Police Force (CRPF), Chandigarh
- 5. Kurukshetra University, Kurukshetra
- 6. St. Stephen's College, Delhi
- 7. Punjab Vidhan Sabha, Chandigarh
- 8. Punjab Archives Department, Chandigarh
- 9. Punjab Heritage Tourism Promotion Board
- 10. The Sikh Review, Kolkata
- 11. Punjabi Sahitya Academy, Ludhiana
- 12. The Tribune, Chandigarh
- 13. Ajit, Jalandhar
- 14. Punjab Kesri, Jalandhar
- 15. Chief Khalsa Diwan, Amritsar
- 16. Shiromani Gurdwara Parbandhak Committee (SGPC), Amritsar
- 17. Delhi Sikh Gurdwara Management Committee (DSGMC), New Delhi
- 18. Gurdwara Angitha Sahib, Patiala
- 19. Punjab Virasat Charitable Trust, SAS Nagar
- 20. Nirmal Sanskrit Vidyala, Varanasi
- 21. Kanya Mahavidyalaya, Jalandhar
- 22. Department of Language, Arts & Culture Himachal Pradesh, Shimla
- 23. Dev Samaj College, Chandigarh
- 23. Madras Regimental Center, Wellington
- 24. Himachal Academy of Language, Arts & Culture, Shimla
- 25. Takht Sri Harimandir Sahib, Patna
- Anandpur Sahib Foundation, Anandpur Sahib
- Rozana Ajit
- Institute of Sikh Studies

=== Major personal libraries ===
The library has digitised around 100 private libraries, including:

- 1. Jathedar Dalip Singh, Malu Nangal
- 2. Dr. Surinder Singh, Chandigarh
- 3. Sodhi Family, Anandpur Sahib
- 4. Mahant Mastan Singh, Dharamkot
- 5. Dr. Gurcharan Singh, Patiala
- 6. Dr. Man Singh Nirankari, Chandigarh
- 7. Dr. Madanjit Kaur, Chandigarh
- 8. Brij Mohan Singh, Dehradun
- 9. Dera Sewa Panthi, Yamuna Nagar
- 10. Prof. Pritam Singh, Patiala
- 11. Gurmail Singh, Patiala
- 12. Gurtej Singh (Ex. IAS), Chandigarh
- 13. Joginder Singh Talwara, Sri Amritsar
- 14. Chetan Singh, Patiala
- 15. Dalip Singh Jathedar, Mallu Nangal
- 16. Dr. Gurdarshan Singh Dhillon
- 17. Gurcharanjit Singh Lamba, Jalandhar
- 18. Harvinder Singh Phoolka (Advocate, Supreme Court), New Delhi, around 20,000 pages of legal records relating to the November 1984 anti-Sikh riots
- 19. Mohan Singh, Chandigarh
- 20. Mahant Kamaljit Singh, Moga
- 21. Prof. Malvinderjit Singh Waraich
- 22. Dr. Kirpal Singh, Chandigarh
- 23. Jasvinder Singh, Nagpur
- 24. Anurag Singh, Ludhiana
- 25. Dr. Harnam Singh Shan, Chandigarh
- 26. Dr. Jaswant Singh Neki, New Delhi
- 27. Dr. Gurdev Singh Sidhu, Chandigarh
- 28. Dr. Kanwarjit Singh Kang, Chandigarh
- 29. Giani Gurdit Singh, Chandigarh
- 30. Baba Sarabjot Singh Bedi, Una
- 31. Anup Khosla | Dr. GB Singh, Noida
- 32. Navjot Pal Singh Randhawa, IAS, Chandigarh
- 33. Bhayee Sikander Singh, Chandigarh
- 34. Dr. P. C. Sharma, Chandigarh
- 35. S. B. Durga, Chandigarh
- 36. Princess Suraj DTVI, Chamba
- 37. Raja Budhishwar Pal, Nalagarh
- Kulwant Singh Musafir
- Trilochan Singh
- Brijinder Singh (descendant of Randhir Singh of the AKJ)

and many more public and personal libraries.

=== Private custodians ===
The collections of over 150 private custodians has been digitised by PDL.

== Timeline ==
- 2009 Nov - Exhibition "Deposition Dispensation: Digitization Directions" was inaugurated by H.E. Gen (Retd.) Dr. S. F. Rodrigues, PVSM, VSM, Governor of Punjab and Administrator of Chandigarh. A special Monograph was also released on the occasion.
- 2009 Dec - Participated and presented a paper in the Parliament of World's Religions at Melbourne, Australia.
- 2010 Feb - Participated and presented a paper titled ‘Panjab Digital Library: Revealing the Heritage of Panjab’ International Conference on Digital Libraries at New Delhi in February 2010.
- 2010 Feb - A month-long mobile exhibition was organized on Architectural Heritage of Panjab at Rose Festival, Chandigarh. The exhibition was on display from 26 February 2010 to 28 March 2010. The theme of the exhibition was "Unveiling the Architecture of the Greater Panjab".
- 2010 Apr - Heritage walk was organized for students of KVRSM School of Chandigarh. About 45 students were taken to Manimajra fort for awareness about the heritage. They were given a lecture about the importance of Heritage.
- 2010 Apr - Exhibited heritage of Panjab at Beant Singh Memorial, Chandigarh. The exhibition was visited among others by His Excellency Shri Shiv Raj Patil, Governor of Panjab and Administrator of Chandigarh.
- 2011 Aug - A webinar "De-Freezing 1930s Panjab" was presented online. The webinar focused on sharing one of PDL's surprise treasures: photographs were taken by Bhai Dhana Singh on a bicycle tour of Panjab of various shrines. The presenters then attempted to visit those shrines again in modern times and see what had changed over the decades.
- 2010 Oct - PDL helped set up a museum at Jagdhari. Sh. Harmohinder Singh Chattha, then Speaker of Haryana Assembly inaugurated in presence of Lt. Gen. (Retd.) Dr. D.D.S. Sandhu, PVSM, VC of Kurukshetra University.
- 2010 Nov - Students of DAV College, Yamuna Nagar visited PDL office to have a first-hand experience of behind the scene activities of a digital library and digitization project.
- 2011 Oct - The Centre on Studies in Sri Guru Granth Sahib coordinated a workshop on 7–8 October 2011 on "Studies on Sri Guru Granth Sahib: Utilization of Computer and Digital Technology." PDL was honored to be presented as a case study in preserving the heritage and facilitating ongoing studies.
- 2012 Feb - Developed a permanent installation of "The Khalsa Raj: Banda Battles & Body Politic" exhibition at Singh Sabha Gurduara in Southhall, UK.
- 2012 Apr - Developed and Exhibited "The Khalsa Raj: Banda Battles & Body Politic" exhibition at City Center Library, Surrey
- 2013 Jul - In collaboration with HRI Southasia, Panjab Digital Library developed an exhibition LIVED STORIES, EVERYDAY LIVES. The exhibition was displayed for the first time at Punjab Kala Bhawan Chandigarh. Afterward, the exhibition traveled to Daudpur village, Khanna district, Panjab.
- 2014 Nov - Organized painting competition and exhibition at Chhapar Chiri, Mohali
- 2014 Nov - Helped Punjab Government with the reprinting of Emly Eden's lithographs for Progressive Punjab Summit
- 2015 Feb - Honored for extraordinary contribution in the field of Digital Library at a conference organized by Bhutta College of Education. Presented a lecture at the conference.
- 2015 Feb - Working with National archives of India to develop policies and standards for digitization.
- 2015 Feb - Provided data backup services to Punjab Heritage Tourism Promotion Board for their rare records.
- 2015 Feb - Organized an exhibition at Banda Singh Bahadur Memorial at Chhapar Chiri, Mohali
- 2015 Nov - Helped Punjab Government with the reprinting of Prince Waldemar's lithographs for Progressive Punjab Summit
- 2015 Dec - Signed an agreement with Anandpur Sahib Foundation to develop and operate a library at Virasat-e-Khalsa Museum.
- 2016 Dec - In collaboration with Bihar Government organized an exhibition, "Emperor-Prophet Guru Gobind Singh Sahib" at Bihar Museum, Patna
- 2017 Feb - Exhibition "Emperor-Prophet Guru Gobind Singh Sahib" at Virasat-e-Khalsa, Anandpur
- 2017 Apr - Photographed 150 protected monuments of Panjab
- 2017 Nov - Curated an Exhibit titled "Monuments of Panjab" for Guru Gobind Singh Khalsa College, Chandigarh on the occasion of a National Seminar
- 2017 Dec - Curated & Produced a portfolio on "Military Tradition of Panjab" for Military Literature Festival
- 2018 Mar - Curated an Exhibit titled "Mid-Nineteenth Century: Fall of the Sikh Empire and Transition in Polity and Socio-Cultural Milieu (1839–1849)" at Guru Gobind Singh Khalsa College, Chandigarh on the occasion of a National Seminar
- 2018 Mar - Curated a catalog of artifacts for Indian Railways Museum at Shimla
- 2018 Nov - Curated and Published "Guns of Glory: Sikh Guns & Inscriptions" for Military Literature Festival, Government of Punjab
- 2019 Nov - Curated and organized a visual art exhibition on Guru Nanak Sahib at Sultanpur Lodhi, Government of Punjab
- 2019 Dec - Curated and Published a catalog of miniatures on the "Life & Legacy of Guru Nanak Sahib" for Military Literature Festival, Government of Punjab
- 2024 Jul - Curated and hosted an exhibition titled "The Sikh Empire 1710-1849: Perspectives by International Artists & Authors".

== Growth ==
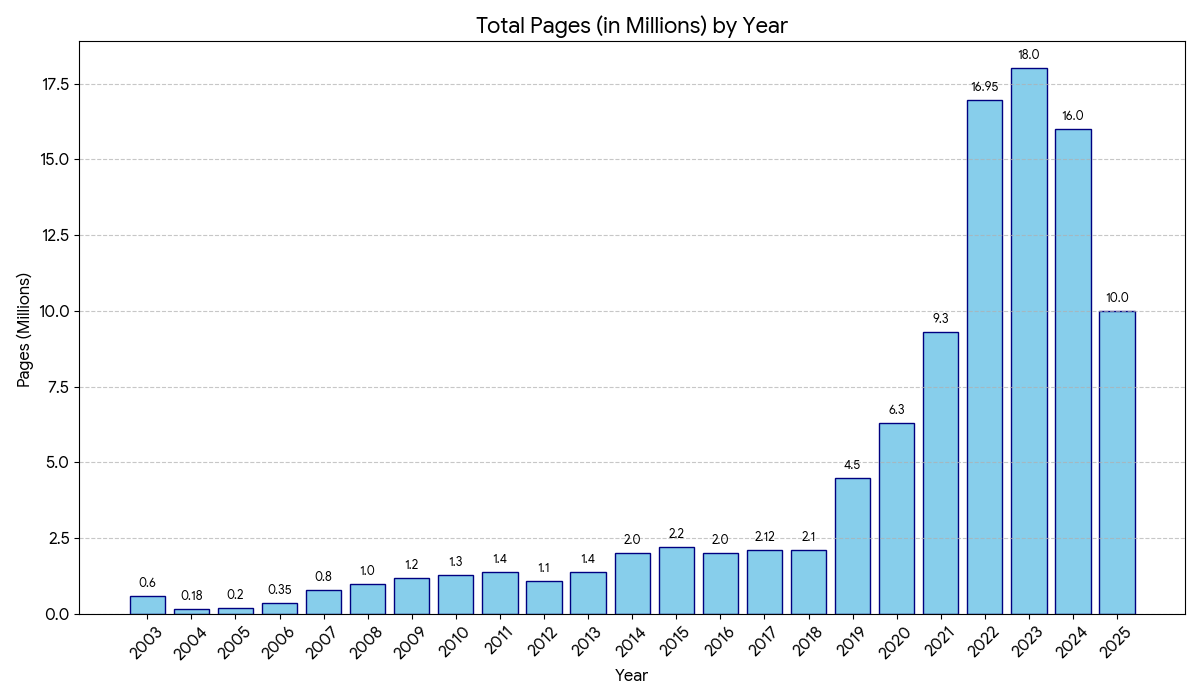

* Estimated pages to be digitized by the year end

In 2003, the first year of operations, 60,000 pages were digitized. By December 2024, over 85 million pages had been digitzed. By March 2026, over 100 million pages had been digitized, coinciding with the Nanakshahi New Year celebration. In recent years, the pace of digitization has slowed due to decreased funding, from 60,000 pages a day declining to 35,000 pages per day being digitized.

=== Current stats ===
Items digitized by the PDL up until December 2024
Media type	Number digitzed
Books	87,700+
Files (pre-1947)	545,000+
Manuscripts	12,350+
Magazines	18,600+
Pamphlets	3,900+
Maps	10,700+
Pictures	211,000+
Articles	47,000+
Documents	19,000+
Newspapers	40,000+
Posters	2,700+
Coins	33,000+
Letters	10,500+
Poems	16,000+
Legal documents	6,000+

== Reception ==
The PDL's work has been praised by scholars like Sikander Singh, Himadri Banerjee, and Amarjit Chandan. PDL has been described as "pioneered digital preservation in regional languages". As per Bajinder Pal Singh in The Indian Express:

They [Panjab Digital Library] have done what the collective effort of Punjab archives department, three universities in Punjab and the Shiromani Gurdwara Parbandhak Committee (SGPC) failed to do.

— Bajinder Pal Singh, The Indian Express (15 November 2005)

In 2009, Sikh Sangat News criticised the organisation for what is claimed was "distortion" of a signature of a Sikh guru it was selling by removing the siri sahib from the top of it, a symbol representing sant-sipahi.

== Awards ==
- Manthan Award India 2007 for best E-Content
- Manthan Award South Asia 2010 for best E-Content

== Gallery ==
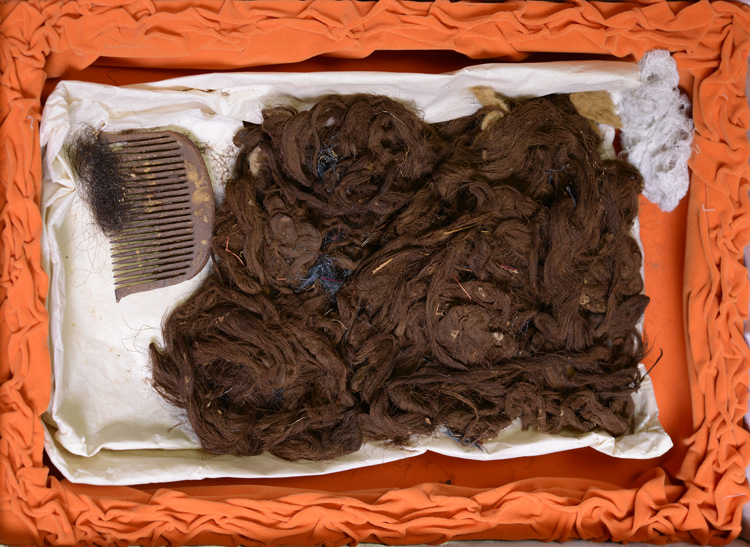
Gifted by Royal family of Nabha to Punjab Government

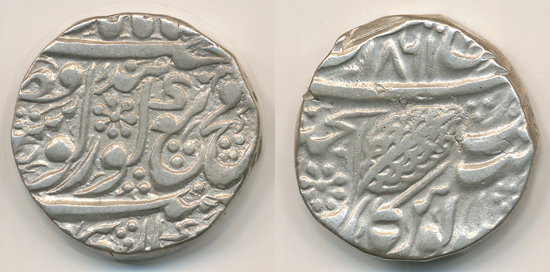
Panjab under Maharaja Ranjit Singh issued coins from 1800 to 1848

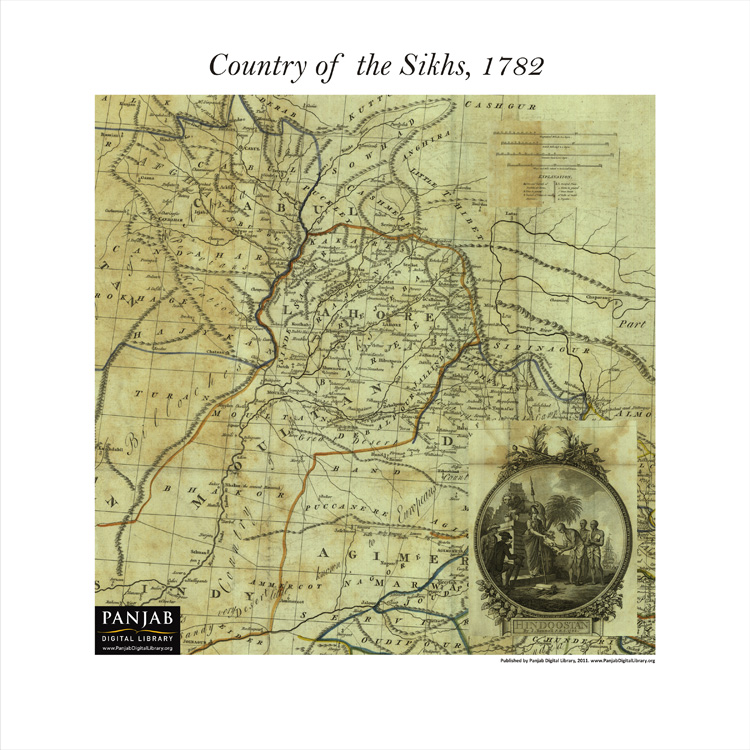
Published in 1783 by James Rennel

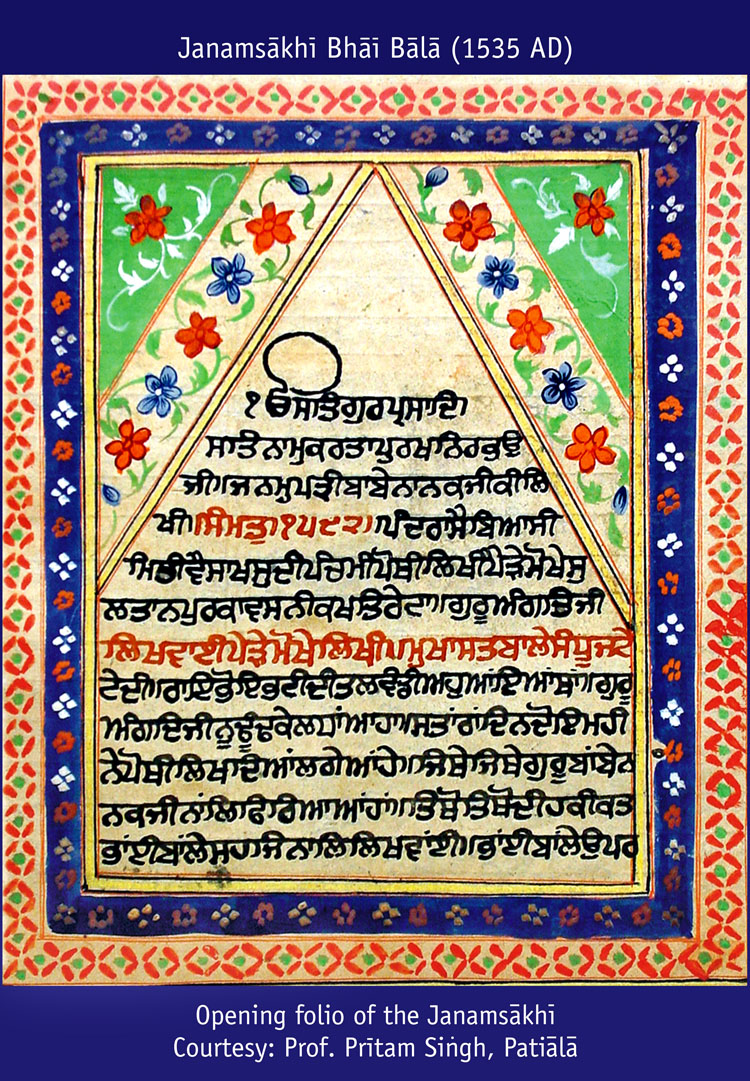
Digitized from Chandigarh Museum

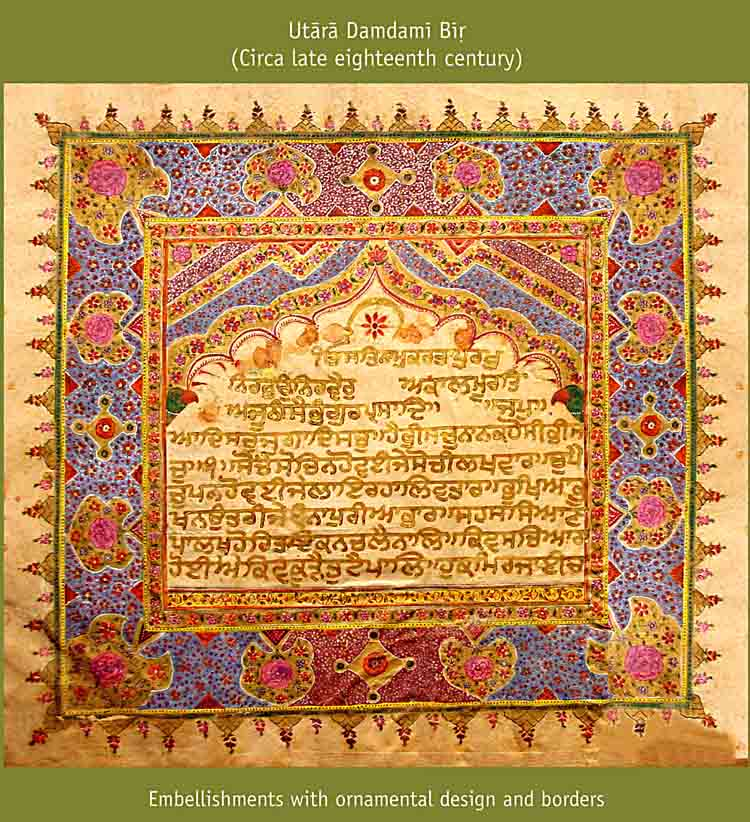
Circa late 18th century

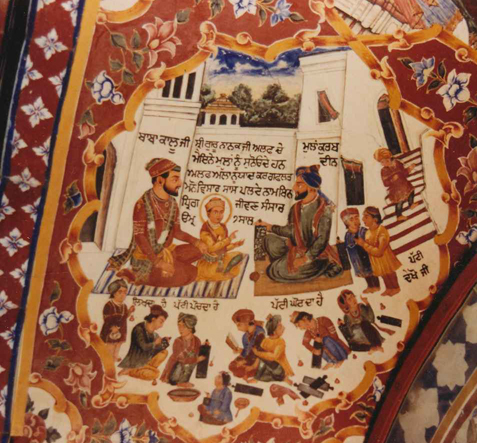
Most of these have been damaged and do not exist in original

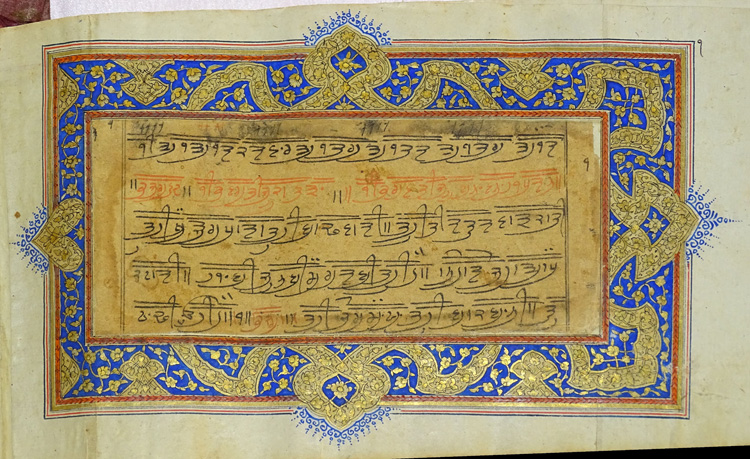
Gifted by the royal family of Nabha to Punjab Government
