= Dhanna Singh (photographer) =

Sikh photographer

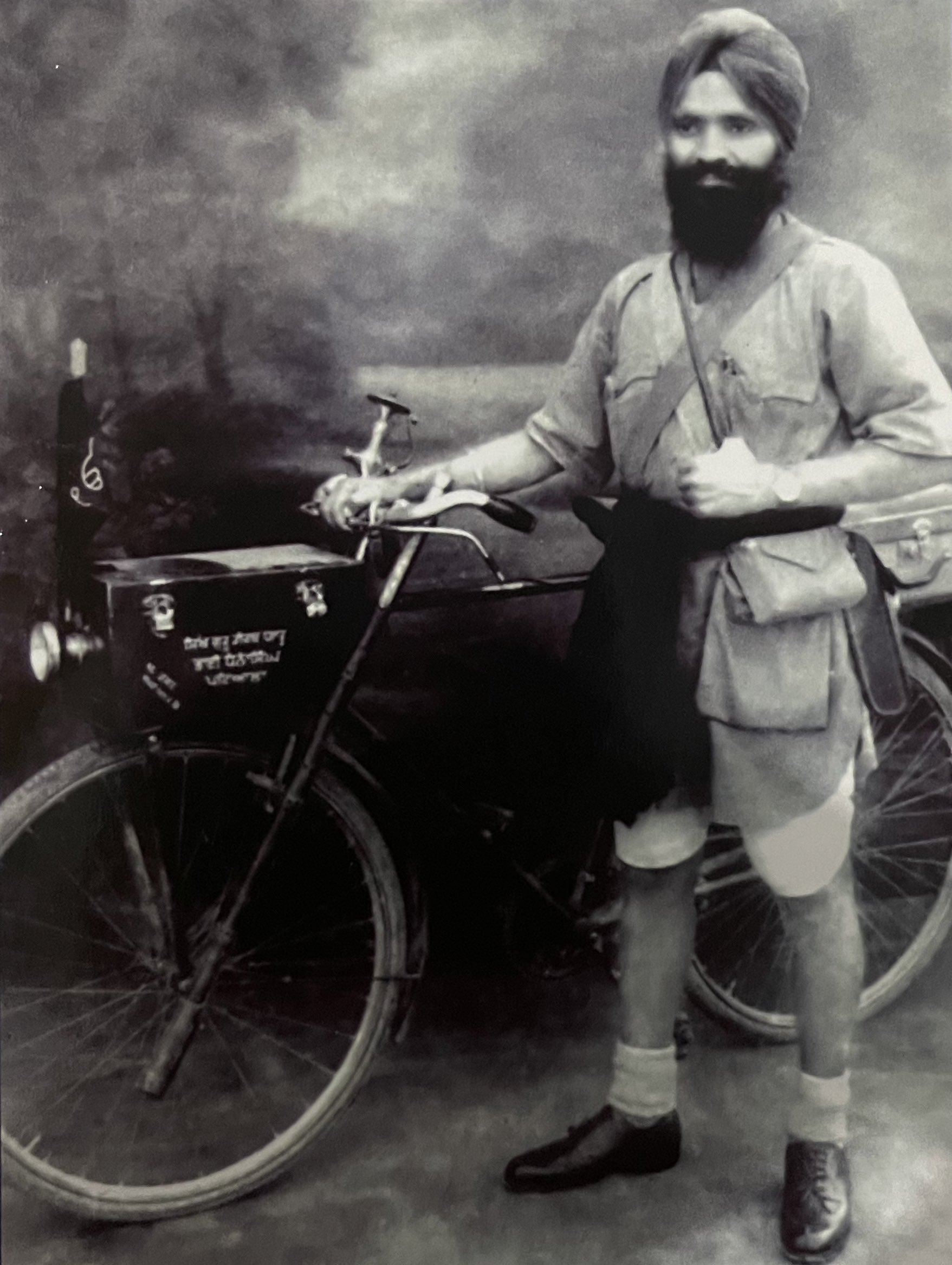
Photograph of Dhanna Singh Chahal 'Patialvi' posing with his bicycle, featured in a 1935 edition of magazine 'Phulwari'.

Dhanna Singh 'Patialvi' (c. 1893 or 1905 – 2 March 1935) was a photographer of colonial-era Punjab. (Note: His name is alternatively spelt as 'Dhana'.) He captured hundreds of photographs of Sikh shrines while travelling around on his bicycle and camera in the 1920s and 1930s. He called himself 'cycle yatru' (meaning "cycle pilgrim"). Travelling over 20,000 miles on his bike, he visited more than 1,600 Sikh sites and captured photographs of many of them. The areas in India he visited stretched from Kashmir in the north, Nanded (Sri Hazur Sahib) in the south, Peshawar (Jamrud) in the west, and Assam in the east. In-addition to his photographs, he also recorded travel diaries. His photograph tour was active from 11 March 1930 to 2 March 1935, consisting of nine trips.

== Biography ==
Dhanna Singh was born as Lal Singh Chahal in Ghannauri village of Sangrur district in circa 1893 in a Chahal Jatt family as the son of Sundar Singh. After the death of his father when he was around ten-years-old, he was raised in the Rajendra-Deva Yatimkhana orphanage alongside his brother in Patiala, where he received a religious education. He would later work in the royal garage of the ruling Patiala family, getting the job via a connection to Jiva Singh, who had been working there, Lal Singh looked after the vehicles of Maharaja Bhupinder Singh and was a driver. Dhanna Singh was a resident of Changli, Dhuri tehsil, Sangrur district.

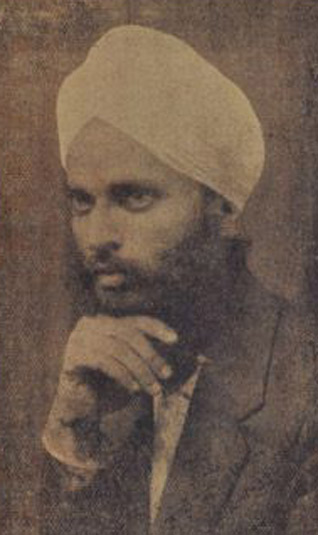
Portrait of Dhanna Singh, featured in a 1935 edition of magazine 'Phulwari'.

During a trip to Nanded in the Deccan, he became influenced by Sant Nidhan Singh, with Lal Singh undergoing the Pahul baptism ceremony and took-on the Khalsa name of Dhanna Singh and retired from his job with the Patiala state. He began his cycling tours in the 1920s, with him first travelling to Uttar Pradesh, Bihar, Bengal, and Assam. The model of bicycle he rode-on was the Elswick Company, No. 56113 H.C. During his trip to Ayodhya, he did not mention the Babri Masjid dispute in his writings but he did record about the Sikh history of the city. He returned to Patiala after three years, with his accounts being recorded in Sikh newspapers, and decided to purchase a camera and learn photography to capture subsequent trips. In 1931, he was mentioned by Nahar Singh in the Khalsa Samachar. Furthermore, he is referenced in the Encyclopedia of Sikhism. He featured in the Phulwari periodical during 1935. After travelling around 25,000 miles on his bicycle as part of his photographic-cycling tour, Dhanna Singh was killed in an accidental discharge of a weapon on 2 March 1935 at Hasokhel village near Mir Ali in Bannu district, North-West Frontier Province.

== Collection ==
Before going on his final expedition, he had left his collection of photographs in the safe possession of mistri Gurbaksh Singh of Patiala, which passed onto Seva Singh, his son, and then onto another family, which donated them to the Panjab Digital Library. Dhanna Singh's work remained largely unknown in the years after his death until Chetan Singh (former Director of the Punjab Languages Department), came across his photos and diaries in his family's collection and published them, making them more widely known to the public.

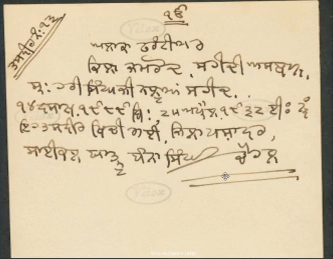
Metadata recorded by Dhanna Singh 'Patialvi' on the verso of a photograph

Much of the structures and sites that Dhanna Singh photographed have since been demolished or altered due to renovations in the past 60–80 years, no longer resembling their state in the 1930s, making it challenging to identify some of the sites he photographed. However, Dhanna Singh wrote detailed inscriptions on the back of his photographs which provide information on the captured scene. His eight diaries and around 200 photographs were digitized by the Panjab Digital Library. Fifteen of Dhanna Singh's two-hundred photographs were presented in a webinar titled De-Freezing 1930's Panjab by Davinder Singh and Daljit Ami on 20 August 2011.

== Gallery ==
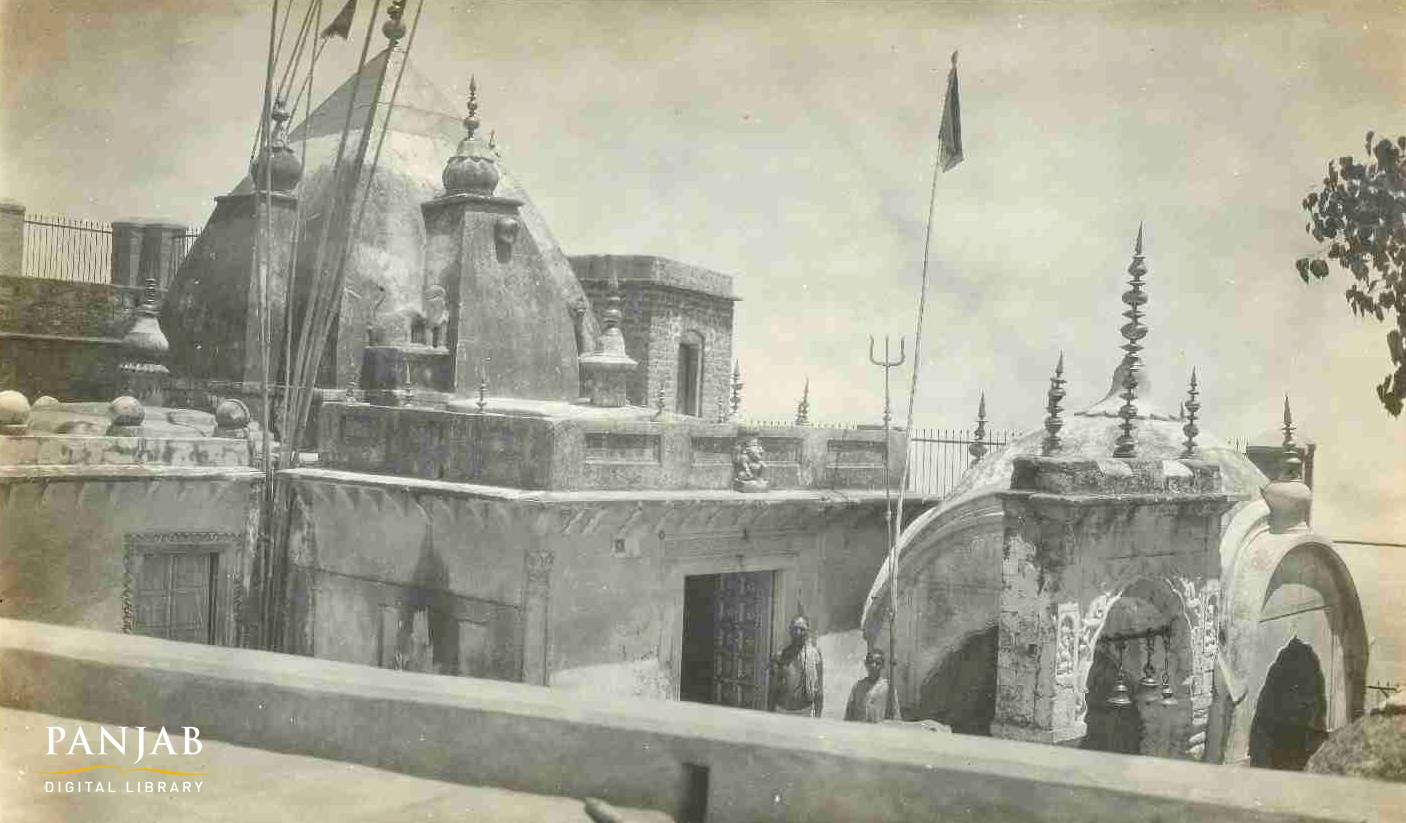
Photograph of the Naina Devi temple of Bilaspur, taken by Dhanna Singh Chahal 'Patialvi', 1934

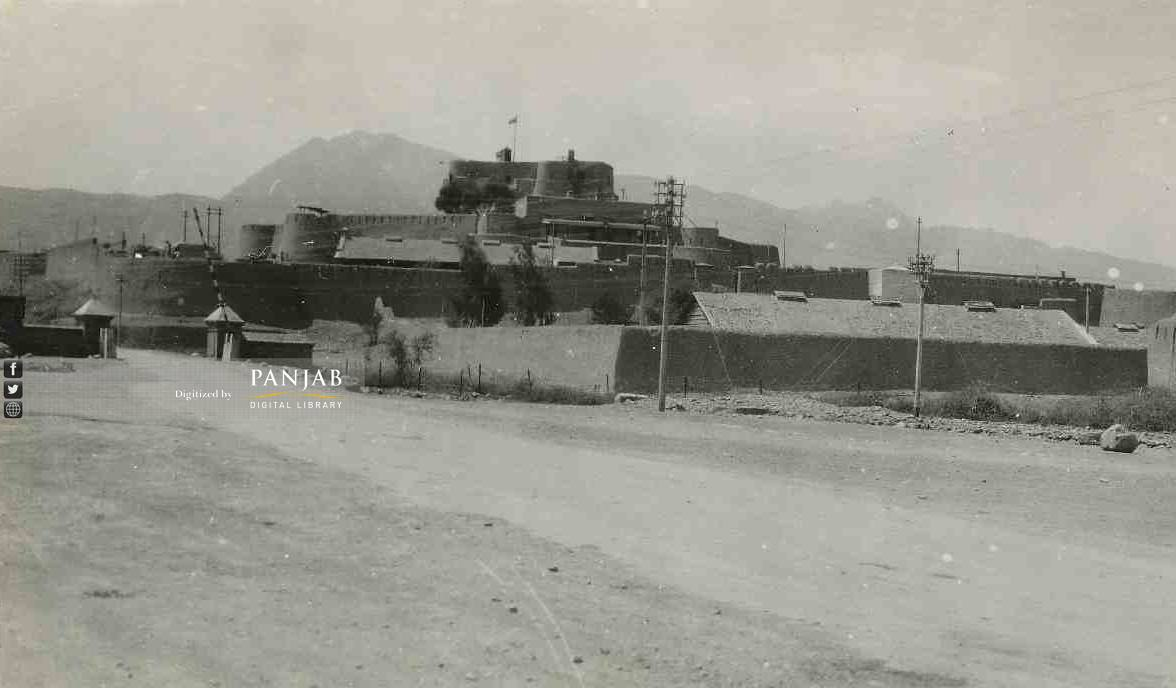
Photograph of Jamrud Fort, taken by Dhanna Singh Chahal 'Patialvi', 1932

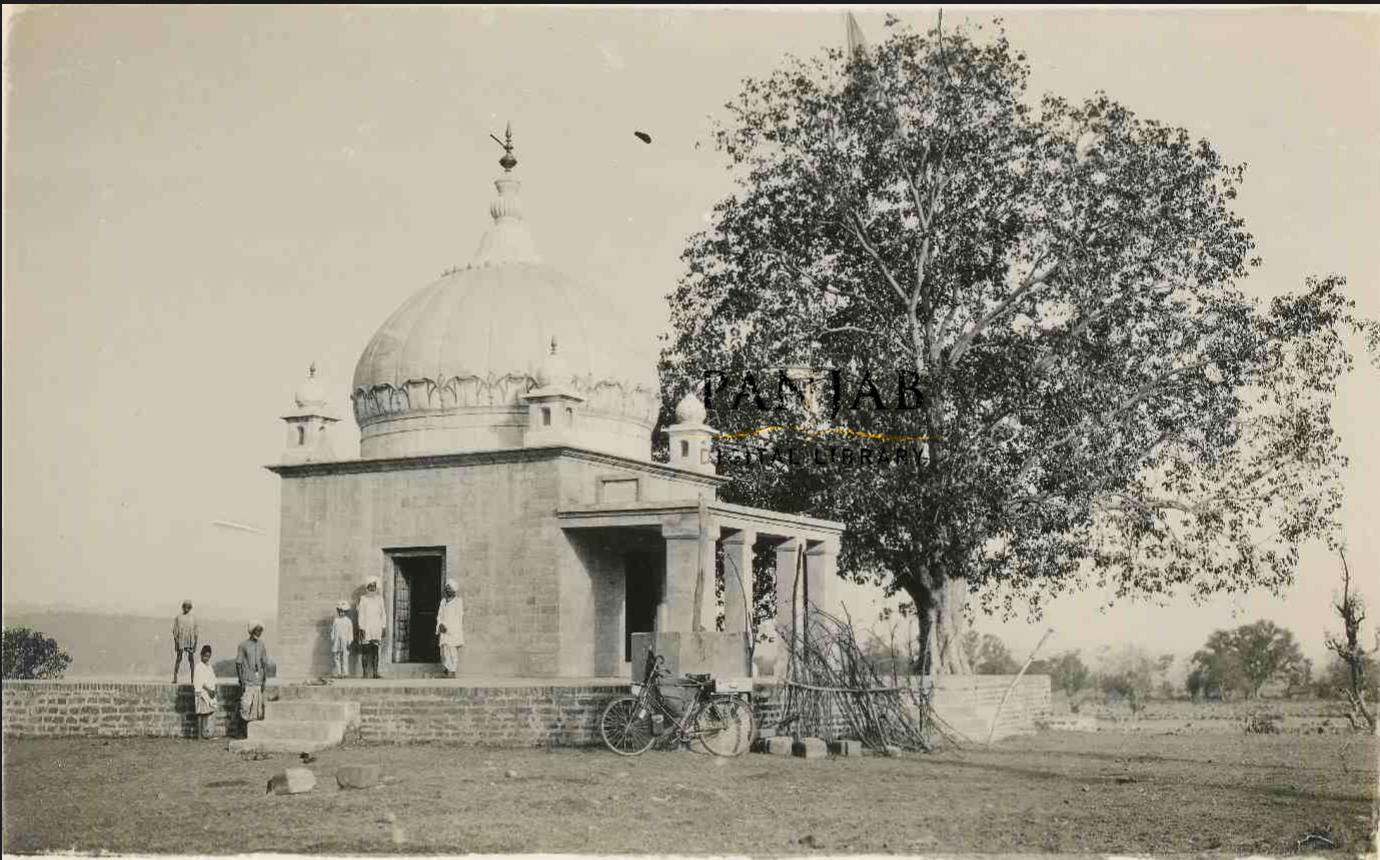
Photograph of Gurdwara Patshahi Dasvin in Nadaun, taken by Dhanna Singh Chahal 'Patialvi', 1933

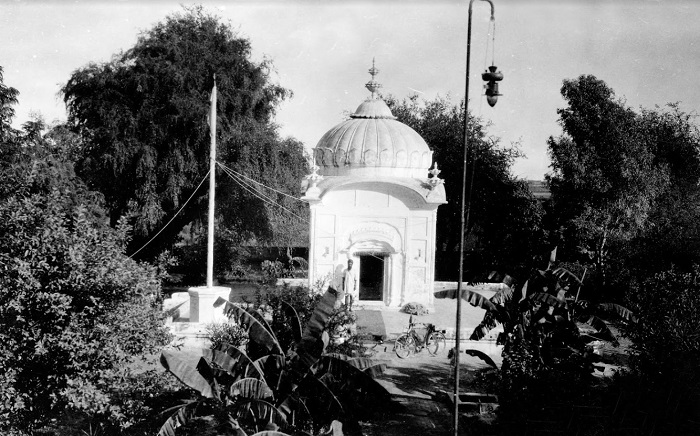
Photograph of Gurdwara Kiara Sahib, by Dhanna Singh Chahal 'Patialvi', 3 October 1933

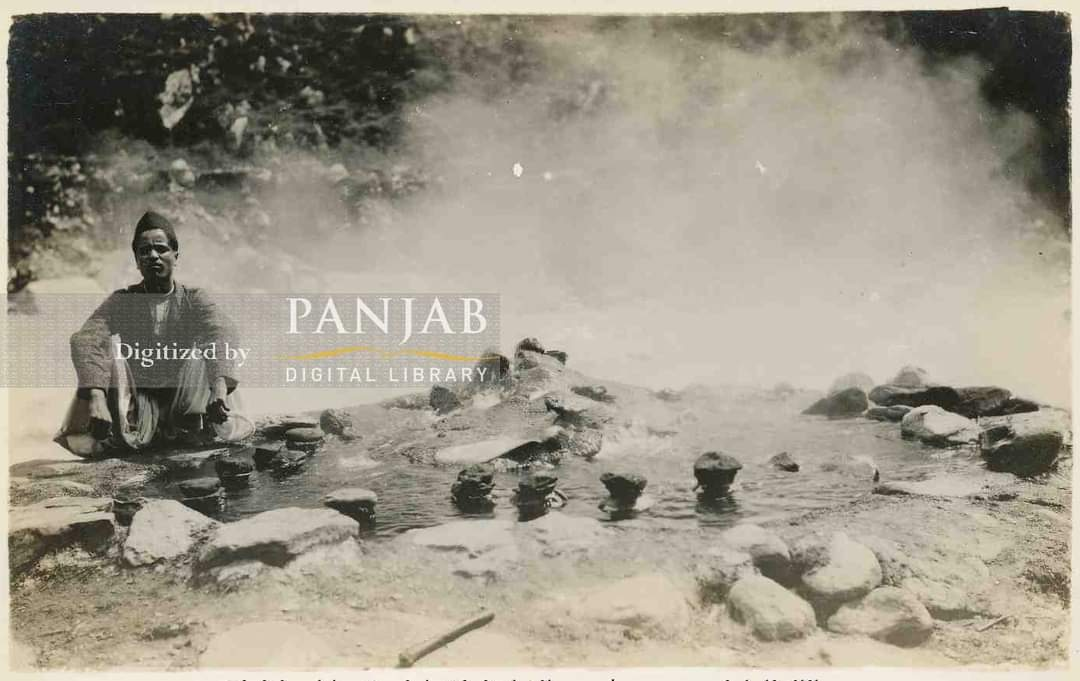
Photograph of the hot springs at Manikaran in Kullu district, taken by Dhanna Singh Chahal 'Patialvi', June 1933

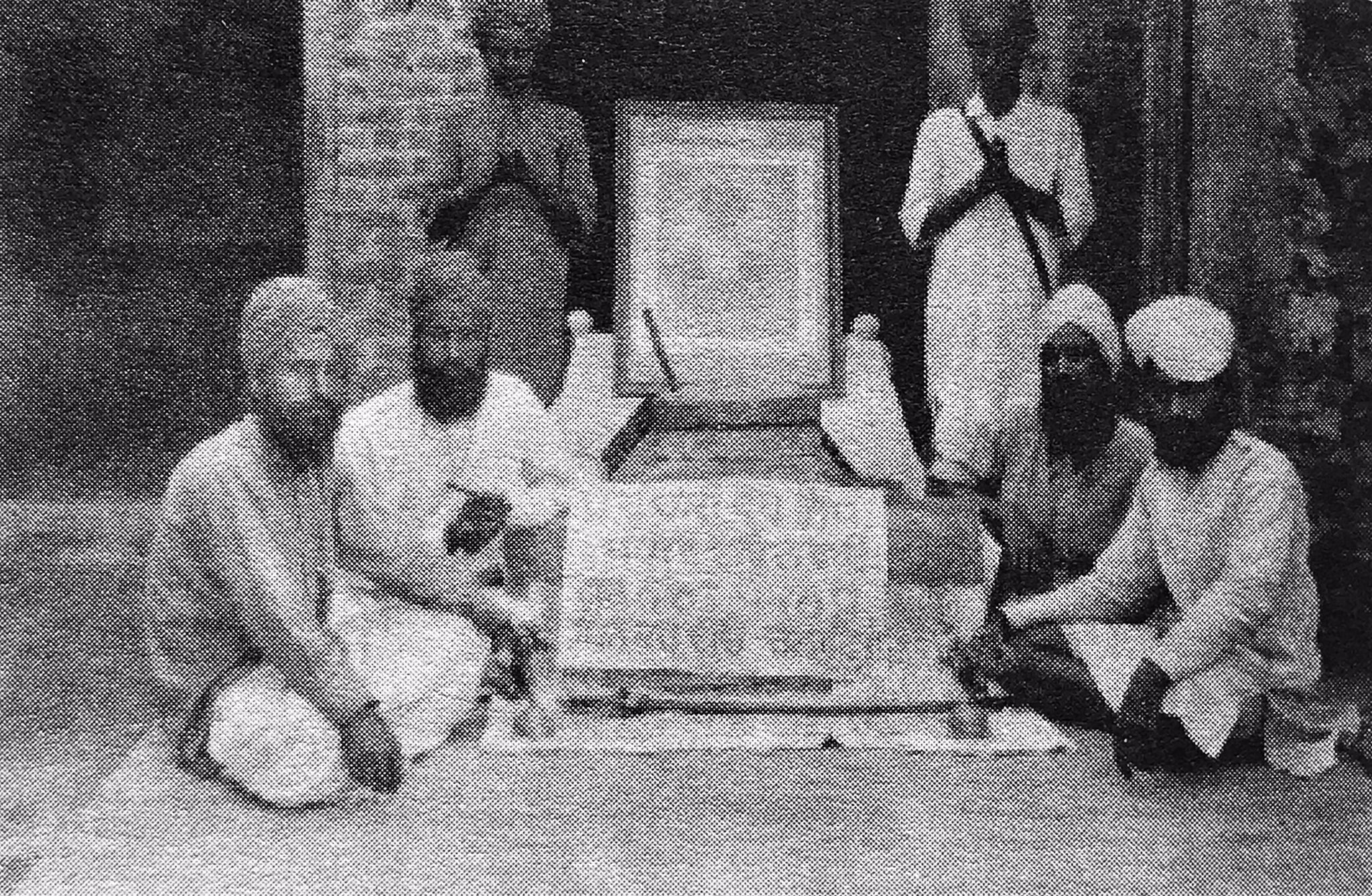
Photograph of Guru Nanak's "chakki" (hand-millstone) relic at Gurdwara Chakki Sahib, Eminabad, taken by Dhanna Singh Chahal 'Patialvi', 4 October 1932
