= Punjab Archives =

Archival agency of Government of Punjab, Pakistan

- Interactive map of Punjab Archives
- 31.5675649°N 74.3028609°E
- Location: Punjab Secretariat, Lahore, Lahore, Pakistan
- Established: 1924
- Affiliation: Government of Punjab – Services and General Administration Department (Archives and Libraries Wing)
- Director: Syeda Shamim Asghar Ali Jafri
- Employees: 50-100

Building information
- Building: Punjab Secretariat
- Website: archives.punjab.gov.pk

The Punjab Archives (Urdu: محفوظات پنجاب) is a repository of the non-current historical and cultural records of Pakistan, located in Lahore, Punjab, Pakistan. It was established in 1924 under British Punjab and is currently under the jurisdiction of the Government of Punjab, Pakistan.

The records date back to the 17th century and cover the pre-colonial, colonial and post-independence era in the Punjab region. The archival holdings number more than seven million files of unique documents and rare books. These records officially belong to the Government of Punjab, dating back to the year 1629. Its mission is to drive openness, cultivate public participation and make them available to Government officials. The access to the record will be expanded to general public through a system of nation-wide digitization.

It was established in 1924 by Lt. Colonel H. L. O. Garret under the British administration of Punjab and then inherited by the Government of Punjab, following Pakistan's independence.

== Collection ==
The Punjab Archives’ collection comprises over seven million documents and more than 70,000 rare books. This collection exists in a varying state of order and organization. Most of the collection is in great public demand so it was decided that the documents should be digitized through collaboration between PITB and Archives & Libraries Wing, S&GAD. A project of this scope has not yet been conducted in Pakistan. Thus it is important to operate on a low-risk level with a zero-tolerance policy of damage to documents.

The project is designed in phases. In the first phase five hundred thousand (500,000) documents, which are to be preserved, catalogued and digitized, are selected from the following collections:

- Mughal documents, 1629–1857. This collection contains 82 files.
- Records from the Delhi, Ludhiana, Karnal, Ambala, Lahore and North West Frontier Agencies and Residencies 1804–1849. These records are available in 247 bounded volumes, containing handwritten correspondence. Each volume is of an average 300 pages, bringing the size of the collection to 73,000 pages.
- Records from the Lahore Residency (1846–1849) and Punjab Province administration after annexation of 1849, covering the Home, Political, Revenue, Judicial, General and Military Departments 1849–1969. These records amount to roughly 34,045 files and each file is of an average of 14 pages. Thus this collection contains roughly 490,000 pages, which are to be catalogued and digitized.
- The record of the War of Independence, 1857. This collection contains 2100 files.

The above-mentioned records are either hand written or in manuscript form. Many of the documents and manuscripts are the only available copies in the world.

In the second phase, rest of the Archives documents are to be digitized. The project has been initiated with this conviction that all the documents within the possession of Archives will be digitized and available online to the scholars and general public of the world. It is also anticipated that this is going to be an important addition to the existing body of knowledge.

== Persian Record of Mughal and Sikh Period ==
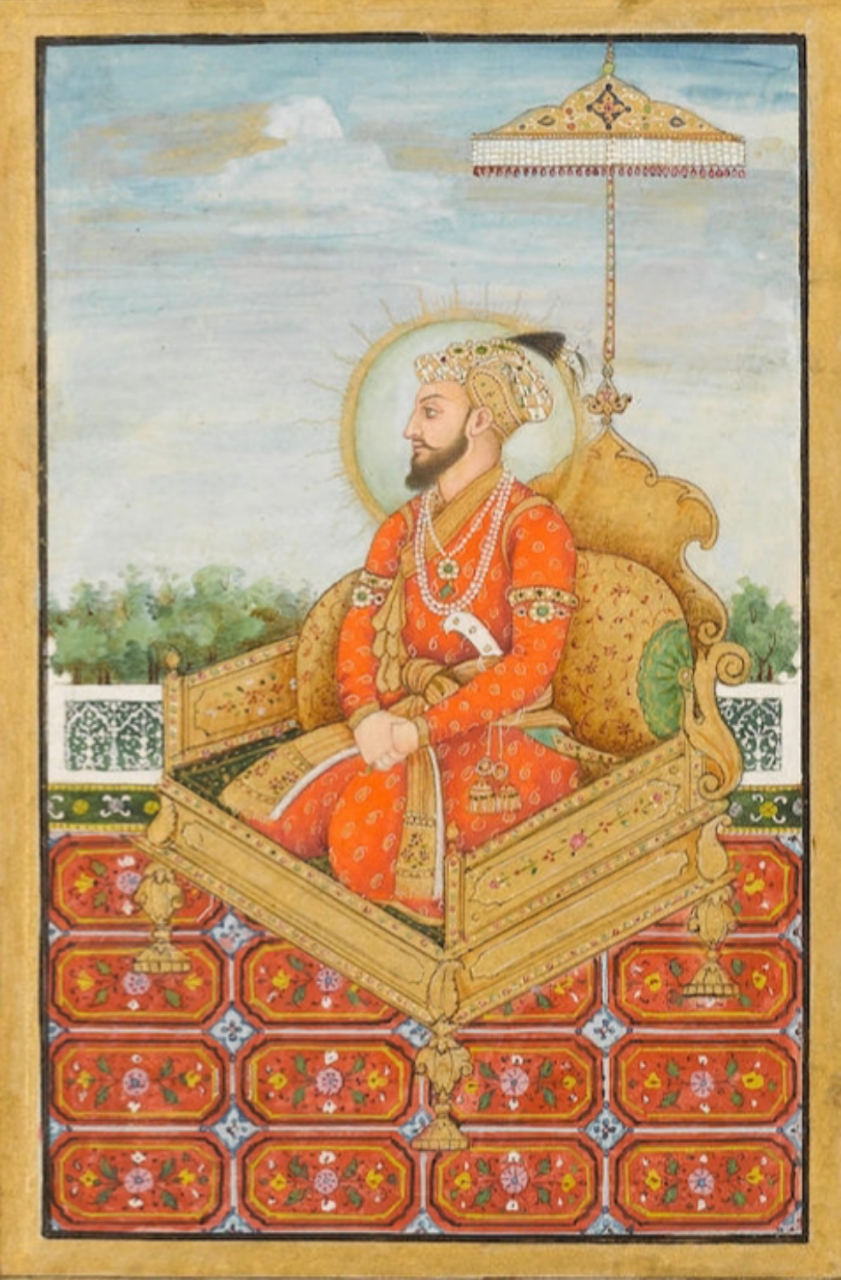

The oldest official record kept in the Punjab Government Archives is related to the Mughal and Sikh era mostly in Persian language. The Mughal record dates back to 1629 while the Sikh record is available from 1799 to 1849. These original records are kept in files, bounded book volumes and loose sheets.

== Akhbar Darbar-I-Lahore (Persian) ==
The very rare official newspaper of Sikh period containing daily proceedings of the court of Maharaja Ranjit Singh and his successors from 1835 to 1849, are available in Punjab Archives.

== Persian Record of Colonial Period ==
These papers are tied in bundles of cotton cloth, and are known as the bastas. These bastas are 300 in number and contain official documents in Persian. They are related to important historical junctures, including:

- Trade with Central Asia (1846–1875)
- Papers relating to Nepal (1815–1877)
- Papers relating to the Lahore Darbar (1839–1845)
- The Ludhiana Agency Papers (1809–1840)
- Papers relating to Mulraj and the Uprising of Multan (1848)
- Papers relating to the Second Sikh War, the Uprising of the Hazara under Sardar Chattar Singh and the rebellion of Bhai Maharaj Singh
- Papers relating to the First Afghan War (1827–1842)

== Old Persian newspapers ==
- Newspaper Lahore, Kashmir, Multan, Bahawalpur, Kabul and Kandhar, Peshawar and Tribal Areas, Hazara (1843–1844)
- Newspapers Kabul, Kandhar, Peshawar, Sindh, Natives States, Lahore, Kashmir, Awadh, Jesore, and Bahawalpur (1842–1844)
- Government Gazette, Calcutta (Persian) (1840–1844)
- Sadique-ul-Akhbar, Shahjahan Abad (1844)
- Akhbar-i-Bahawalpur (1843–1845)
- Akhbar-i-Kashmir & Kabul (1843–1844)

== English record ==
The Punjab Archives also has an extensive collection of official documents of British Raj in various areas of South Asia, including records of the Delhi Residency and Agency, which were transferred to Lahore after the War of Independence in 1857. Present-day KPK was then a part of Punjab, and all the record relating to the Peshawar and Dera Ismail Khan Divisions and the Tribal Agencies, before the creation of a separate province in 1902, are also preserved here. The province of Sindh was annexed by Sir Charles Napier in 1843. Papers relating to Sindh, until it became a part of the Bombay Presidency, are also kept in the Punjab Archives. Besides, the Punjab Archives contain papers relating to the occupation of the tribal areas in Baluchistan. Records relating to the political relations of Jammu and Kashmir State, Afghanistan and Persia with certain Middle East Principalities in the nineteenth century, are preserved here as well. Therefore this record office is a rich repository of historical documents relating to the North Western part of the South Asian Sub-continent from 1809 onwards. The archives of Administrative Departments, from the time Punjab was annexed in 1849 to the present, is also stored at the Punjab Archives. In addition, these archives also house gazetteers, budget books, commission reports, inquiry reports, committee reports and census reports containing important historical data.

== Colonial Agencies record 1804 to 1849 ==
- Revenue Records of the Delhi Residency from 1807 to 1831.
- Political and miscellaneous Record of the Delhi Residency and Agency 1806–1857.
- Four Bundles of correspondence relating to the affairs in Afghanistan (i.e. 1st Afghan War) 1841–1842.
- Delhi Ludhiana and Karnal Agencies 1804–1816 Book No. 1-15.
- Ambala Agency from 1809 to 1815 Books Nos. 16–91.
- Ludhiana Agency from 1816 to 1840 Books Nos. 82–125.
- North-West Frontier Agency, letters received in from 1840 to 1845 Books Nos. 126–136.
- Ludhiana Agency-Letters Dispatched from 1831 to 1829 Books Nos. 137–147.
- North-West Frontier Agency Letters dispatched from 1840 to 1845 Books Nos. 148–167.
- Lahore Residency from 1846 to1847 Books Nos. 168 to 197.
- Miscellaneous Books Nos. 198–210.

== Record after Annexation, 1849 ==
After annexation in 1849, Punjab was given under the charge of a Board of Administration, constituted for the purpose. The 1st regular English record is related to the Board of Administration. With the settlement of affair and political peace, the regular offices were set up and the government work started under the proper departments as elsewhere in India. The Board of Administration was abolished in 1853 and Punjab was given the status of Chief Commissioner Province. After the War of Independence in 1857, Delhi and Hassar divisions were transferred to Punjab, which was given the status of Lieutenant Governor’s Province in 1858. In 1921, it was placed under a Governor’s Province.

Following table will indicate the regular English Records under different departmental heads preserved in the Punjab Archives:

SR. No	Name of department	Years
1	Political Department	1849-1947
2	Revenue Department	1849 to 1947
3	Finance Department	1869 to 1946
4	Public Health Department	1928 to 1945
5	Commerce and Industry	1905 to 1921
6	Local-Self Government	1921 to 1947
7	Education Department	1849 to 1868
8	Financial Department	1862 to 1900
9	Chief Commissioner Cis. and Trans-Sutlej Territory	March 1848 to April 1849
10	Forest Department	1860 to 1900, 1872 to 1920
11	Board and Committee Department	1878 to 1888, 1888 to 1921
12	Home Department; Home General, Police, etc.; Home Gazette; Home Judicial; Home Medical, Jail and Sanitary	1849 to 1900; 1869 to 1887, 1888 to 1943; 1888 to 1917; 1882 to 1950; 1882 to 1942
13	Record after 1947 to 1990	H-Block
14	Record after 1990 to 2005	Old IG Block

== Record of Princely/Native States in Punjab ==
There were 44 Princely/Native States subordinate to the Punjab Government and prominent amongst them were Kashmir, Bahawalpur, Jind, Nabha, Patiala, Hunza, Chitral, Kalat, Maler Kotla, Patodi and Simla Hill States. The record pertaining to these states, from 1849 to 1947, is kept in Punjab Archives.

== Libraries under archives wing ==
There are approximately 70,000 rare books available in the following very old libraries of Punjab:

- Archives Library
- Secretariat Library
- Chief Secretary Library
- Board of Revenue Library.

== Record after Annexation, 1849 ==
To give in brief or specify the names of the departments, the records of which are available in our repository it would be appropriate to state that after annexation in 1849 the Punjab was given under the charge of a Board of Administration constituted for the purpose. The 1st regular English record relates to that of the Board of Administration. With the settlement of affair and political peace the regular offices were set up and the government work started under the proper departments as elsewhere in India. The Board of Administration was abolished in 1853 and Punjab was given the status of Chief Commissioner Province. After the War of Independence in 1857, the Delhi and Hassar divisions were transferred to the Punjab which was given the status of Lieutenant-Governor’s Province in 1858. In 1921, it was placed under a Governor’s Province.

The following table will indicate the regular English Records under different departmental heads preserved in the Punjab Archives:

In addition to these records, the Punjab Archives also has an extensive collection of official documents from the British Raj from various areas of South Asia, including records of the Delhi Residency and Agency, which were transferred to Lahore after the War of Independence in 1857. Present-day KPK was then a part of Punjab, and all the records relating to the Peshawar and Dera Ismail Khan Divisions and the Tribal Agencies before the creation of a separate province for this area are also preserved here. The province of Sindh was annexed by Sir Charles Napier in 1843 and all papers relating to Sindh until it became a part of the Bombay Presidency are also kept in the Punjab Archives. Besides, the Punjab Archives contain all the papers relating to the occupation of the tribal areas in the Baluchistan. All records relating to the political relations of the Jammu and Kashmir State, Afghanistan and Persia commercial relations with certain Middle East Principalities in the nineteenth century are preserved here as well. The record office is, therefore, a rich repository of historical documents relating to the North Western portion of the South Asian sub-continent from 1809 onwards. The archives of all Administrative Departments from the time Punjab was annexed in 1849 are also stored at the Punjab Archives. In addition to this, the archive also houses gazettes and census reports containing important historical data. In total, it is estimated that the Punjab Archives house over 80,000 books and 700,000 official files.

== See also ==
- Ottoman archives
