= Sikh National Archives of Canada =

Sikh archive

- Location: 16 Regan Road, Unit 37, Brampton, Ontario, Canada, L7A 1C2, Brampton, Canada
- Type: Religious and cultural archive
- Established: 1999
- Website: sikhnationalarchives.com

The Sikh National Archives of Canada (SNAC) is a Canadian Sikh organization dedicated to collecting, storing and archiving historical, religious, and cultural literature, scriptures, books, articles, and other materials relating to Canadian Sikhs and their religion. It further aims to improve the promotion and understanding of Sikh values, culture, and heritage. It is a registered charity in Canada. Originally based in Ottawa, the archive is now located in Brampton.

== Operations ==
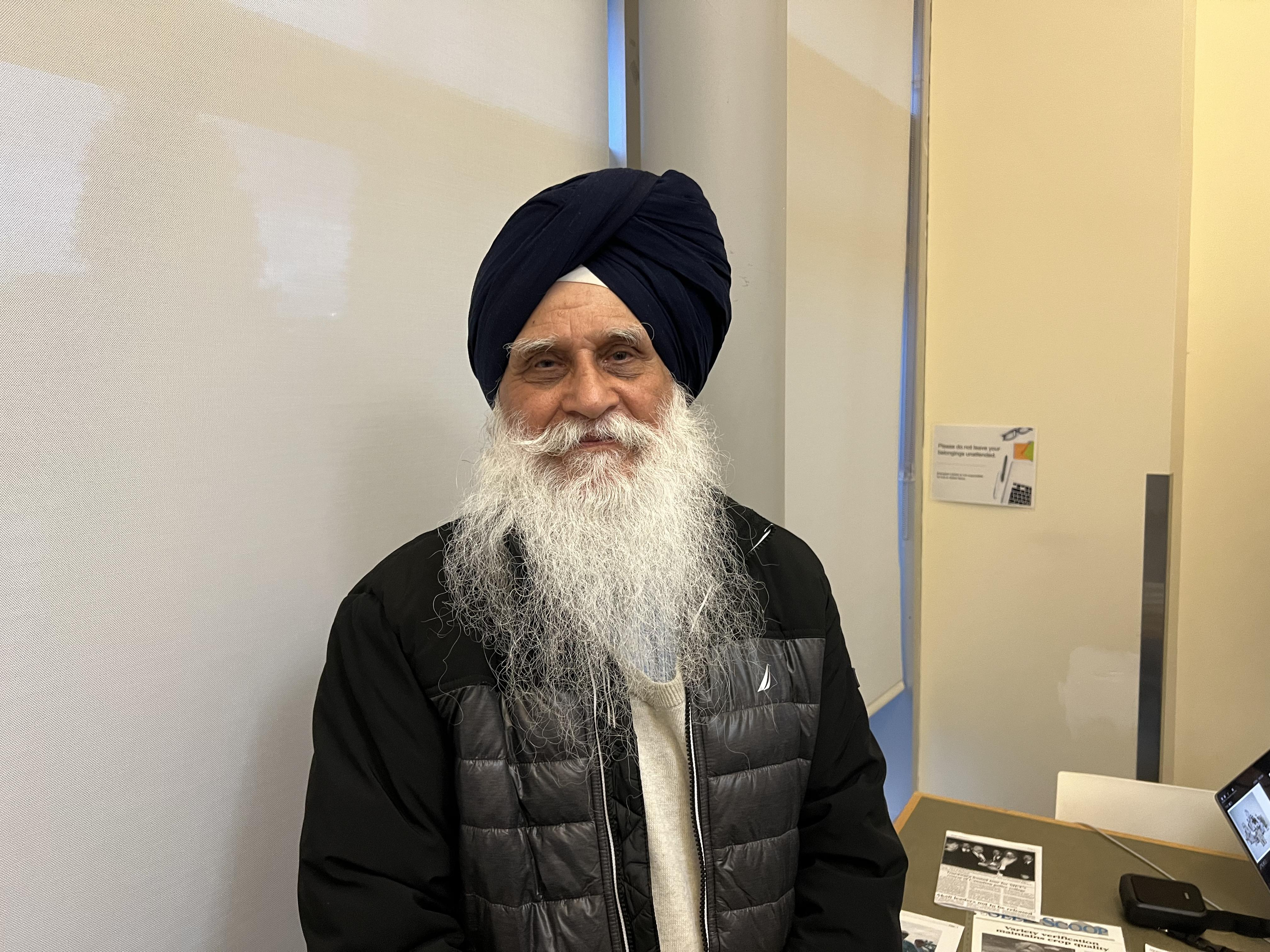
Photograph of Ajit Singh Sahota, co-founder of the National Sikh Archives of Canada and former president of the World Sikh Organization, taken on 16 April 2026

The Ajit Singh Sahota began collecting Sikh materials after Operation Blue Star and the destruction of the Sikh Reference Library in 1984. The archive became a registered charity in 1999. It was co-founded by Ajit Singh Sahota, whom had served as the president of the World Sikh Organization from 2001 to 2005. Since 1984, the archive's collection was housed at its main office in Ottawa on 1181 Cecil Avenue. Most financial support for the archive comes from individual donors and its operations are run by volunteers. One volunteer active in the organization is art-therapist Rapinder Kaur. Some of the materials in the archive's collection were donated by Jaiteg Singh Anant. It has partnership agreements with the Guru Nanak Institute of Global Studies (GNI). In 2020, the organization digitized 350,000 pages. The archive hosts data that may be useful for genealogy.

The organization conducts community scanning events, where it volunteers to freely scan and digitize materials (such as documents, photographs, literature, relics, artefacts, letters, manuscripts, newspaper articles, magazines, scrapbooks, journal entries, and medals) held by the community related to Canadian Sikhs and Punjabis. The archive hosts an online website that makes digitized literature and other material available for public reading. It also hosts informational events at local libraries and schools. The archive is currently located in Brampton, Ontario.

== See also ==
- Sikh Heritage Museum of Canada
- Sikh Heritage Month
- Sikh Reference Library
- Sikh History Research Centre
