= Sikh Heritage Museum of Canada =

Museum

Coordinates: 43.7099°N 79.6518°W

- Established: 2014
- Location: 2980 Drew Rd #125, Mississauga, Ontario, Canada
- Website: shmc.ca

The Sikh Heritage Museum of Canada (SHMC) is a heritage museum dedicated to the history, religion, and culture of the Canadian Sikh community located in Malton, Mississauga, Ontario, Canada. It is a provincially incorporated non-profit organization.

== Operation ==
In 2011, a Sikh heritage museum was founded and first opened in Abbotsford, British Columbia as part of the centennial celebrations of the Gur Sikh Temple (est. 1911). The Sikh heritage museum in Ontario was established in fall 2014 by co-founders Kulbir Singh Dhillon, Harminder Mann, and Harminder Mann. Its executive director is Pardeep Singh Nagra. It focused on holding exhibits relating to artifacts, publications, photographs, and documents of historical significance to the Canadian Sikh community and to foster an educational environment. The museum initiated the National Sikh Heritage Trail, covering 11,000 kilometres across Canada. The museum also received funding support from Canadian government organizations.

== 2026 fire and flood damage ==
On 26 February 2026, the museum suffered a fire and flood, destroying and damaging much of its collection. The remaining, surviving collection was water-damaged and the building the museum was housed in has to be gutted and rebuilt. The museum continued its planned events despite the setback.

== See also ==
- Sikh National Archives of Canada
- Sikh Reference Library
- Sikh History Research Centre
