= Hardeep Tauo Toganwalia =

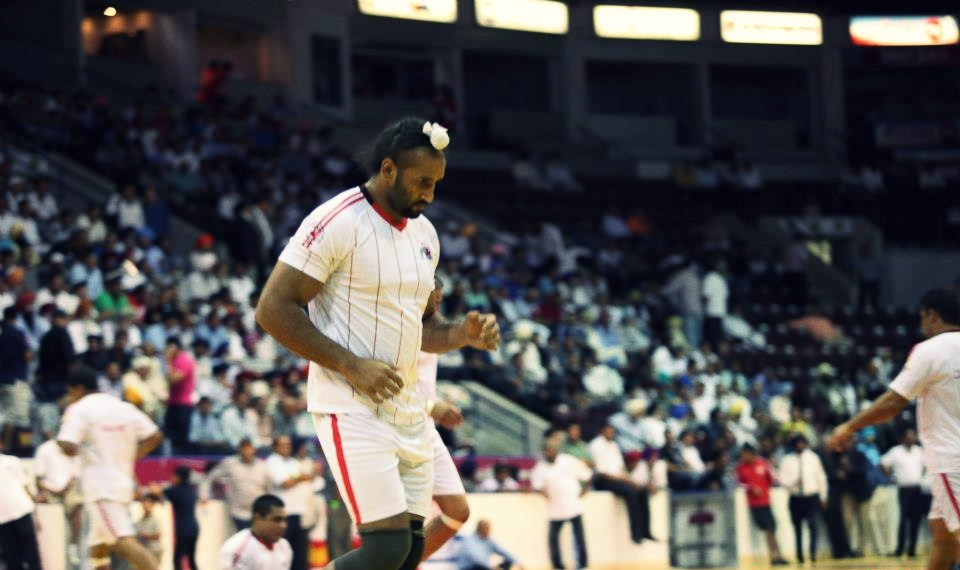
- At Canada Kabaddi Cup 2012

Personal information
- Full name: Hardeep Singh Sra
- Nickname: Tauo
- Nationality: Canadian
- Born: 6 April 1984 (age 42) Village Toganwal, Kapurthala district, Punjab
- Height: 6 ft 3 in (1.91 m)
- Weight: 108 kg (238 lb)

Sport
- Sport: Kabaddi
- Club: Azaad Kabaddi Club
- Team: Canada
- Updated on 4 December 2012

Hardeep Tauo Toganwalia (born 6 April 1984) is a professional kabaddi player. He plays as a stopper in circle style kabaddi. He is 6 ft 3 in (1.91 m) tall and weighs 108 kg (238 lb). He is known for his unique playing style, and affectionately known by the name "Tauo". Tauo stands for Father's elder brother in Haryanvi. Opponents gave him the nickname and he has it tattooed on the knuckles of his left fist.

== Early life ==
Tauo was born in village Toganwal, Kapurthala district (Punjab). He was born in a Sikh family as Hardeep Singh Sra on 6 April 1984, son of Mohinder Singh Sra and Surinder Kaur Sra. He completed his schooling from —M.D.S.D senior secondary school, Kapurthala. Tauo won the best athlete award in Khalsa College, Sultanpur in 2003. While completing his graduation from DAV college, Amritsar he won a silver medal in judo in University competitions in 2004 . Gradually he started to steep towards Indian power sports like wrestling and kabaddi. Tauo mastered the technicality of these sports at his village Toganwal.

== Kabaddi career ==
Tauo started his career in kabaddi with Sher-E-Punjab Kabaddi Academy, California in 2005. Since then he has been representing internationally for many countries like Philippines, Germany, Poland, Norway, United States, Italy, Dubai and Canada. He is associated with kabaddi clubs like Azaad, International Punjabi Sports & Cultural Club, Lion's, Malton & Brampton in Canada. Tauo leads the Azaad Kabaddi Club as the Captain since year 2008, till date. His performances has helped him to achieve the throne of captaincy (Canada team) for the 2012 Kabaddi World Cup. He is often seen promoting body building and kabaddi competitions locally and internationally and encouraging the youth of Punjab to stay away from drugs and advance towards sports.

== Further sources ==
- Singh, Sukhdeep. "kabaddi007.com". Interview before 2012 kabaddi world cup. Surinder Singh Sagoo. Archived from the original on 25 March 2012.
- Dhillon Mau Sahib, Harminder (24 January 2013). "PTI" (PDF). Panjab Times (in Punjabi). p. 49. Archived from the original (PDF) on 24 January 2013.
