= Sikh Reference Library =

Sikh library in Amritsar, India

- The entrance of the library
- 31.619268432138938°N 74.87647883793478°E
- Location: Amritsar, Punjab, India
- Scope: Mainly Sikhism and Punjab, but also contained works on various other topics
- Established: 27 October 1946
- Dissolved: 7 June 1984, Operation Blue Star; Later revived and continues in operation to present-day
- Branch of: Shiromani Gurdwara Parbandhak Committee (SGPC)

Collection
- Size: Estimated 20,000 total literary works just prior to its destruction in June 1984; Revived library estimated to contain 24,540 books in 2017

Other information
- Affiliation: Golden Temple complex Sikh History Research Board of the SGPC

The Sikh Reference Library, originally known as the Central Sikh Library, was a repository of an estimated 20,000 literary works located in the Darbar Sahib (Golden Temple) at Amritsar, Punjab which was destroyed during Operation Blue Star. In 1984, the library's contents were confiscated by the Central Bureau of Investigation (CBI) and the empty building allegedly burned to the ground by the Indian Army on 7 June. In recent years the Shiromani Gurdwara Parbandhak Committee (SGPC) has attempted to recover the looted material but has not yet recovered substantial materials. To date, the status of library manuscripts and artifacts is unclear; the vast majority remain in the hands of the government, a few office files and passports were returned, and as many as 117 items were destroyed for being "seditious" materials.

After the events of Operation Blue Star, the library was revived and its current collection has surpassed the total contents of the original library. The location of the library is on the first floor of the deori (entrance) to the parikrama on the southern side of the Golden Temple.

== Origin ==
The Golden Temple complex is a site of significant meaning for Sikhs, with three or four main location within its premises holding significant amounts of material of historical importance: the Toshakhana (1st floor of the Darshani Deori), the Central Sikh Museum (upper floor of main eastern gate), the Sikh Reference Library (southern gate of the parikrama), and the Guru Ram Das Library (near the Guru Ram Das Sarai). In pre-colonial times, various bungas lined the shrine's parkrama, which produced much literature on various aspects of the Sikh tradition. With the coming of British-rule, these bungas began to be demolished by the colonial authorities, who wanted to monitor the happenings around the shrine. The British appointed a sarbarah to manage the complex but the position and its various successive holders became opposed by Sikhs. The British had opened a museum containing material from Sikh-rule in Lahore in 1865–66. The establishment of the Khalsa College in Amritsar in the late-19th century in the backdrop of the ongoing Singh Sabha movement cultivated a generation of educated Sikhs whom cared about their tangible heritage.

The Gurdwara Reform movement of the early 1920's led to the control over the gurdwaras being transferred from traditional custodians to the Shriomani Gurdwara Parbandhak Committee, who now had the responsibility of caretaking the artefacts in its possession at various Sikh sites. According to Nishaan, the library was founded in 1929. Contemporary Sikh periodicals of the time, such as the Khalsa Samachar and Khalsa Advocate, published articles on the need for proper preservation of relics found at various Sikh locations. After being impacted by the first-hand historical accounts recorded in the works of Karam Singh, Bawa Buddh Singh Bhalla founded the Sikh Historical Society in 1930 at Lahore. At Khalsa College, the Sikh History Research Centre was established, with its own room that had a collection at-first of manuscripts, old books, newspapers, and journals by the 1940's. On 10 February 1945 at a meeting at Khalsa College, Princess Bamba, honorary president of the Sikh Historical Society and daughter of the last maharaja of the Sikh Empire, called for a more aspiring chapter of the Sikh Historical Society to be opened in Amritsar, consisting of Teja Singh, Bawa Prem Singh, Bawa Harkishan Singh, Gurmukh Nihal Singh, and Ganda Singh. The Central Sikh Library was then folded into the Sikh Reference Library.

== Historical materials ==
Prior to its destruction by Indian troops, the library hosted a vast collection of an estimated 20,000 literary works, including 11,107 books (another estimate puts the number of books having been 12,613), 2,500 manuscripts, 20–25 handwritten edicts (hukamnama) signed and issued by the Sikh Gurus, newspaper archives, historical letters, and documents or files. It also contained handwritten manuscripts (bir) of the Guru Granth Sahib, the primary and central Sikh scripture. The library also held documents related to the Indian Independence Movement. Most of the literature was written in the Punjabi-language and related to Sikhism, but there were also Hindi, Assamese, Bengali, Sindhi, Persian, Arabic, Tibetan, English, and French works touching upon various topics.

According to the Panjab Digital Library, the contents of the library contained the following prior to its loss:

Collection of the Sikh Reference Library prior to its loss
Type	Number
Books	~20,000
Manuscripts of Guru Granth Sahib	~2,500
Manuscripts related to the Sikh Gurus	~500
Newspapers since 1876	~120 files
Rare books and documents	~200
Hukamnamas and Sikh Relics	~160
Rare paintings	~250

== Destruction ==
There is controversy surrounding the government's version of events on what happened to historical manuscripts, books, and artifacts before the Sikh Reference Library was burned.

According to the Indian Army white paper on Operation Blue Star, the library was destroyed on the night of 5 June 1984 in the midst of a firefight. However, according to V. M. Tarkunde, the library was still intact on 6 June when the Army had gained control of the Golden Temple, and was in fact burned down by the army at some point between 6 June and 14 June. Although the Indian Army has maintained that the library's contents were completely destroyed on 5 June, the SGPC has contradicted their version of events. By using witness accounts, the SGPC has alleged that material from the library was taken in gunny sacks on military truck to Amritsar's Youth Club, a temporary office of the CBI, and the empty library was burned by the army afterwards. At that location, the CBI catalogued the materials until September 1984, when in light of a Sikh convention being held in the city, the library's contents were moved to an undisclosed location. By the end of June, news about the destruction of the library began to be circulated and in early July, government white-papers admitted that the library had been destroyed during the operation but blamed the Sikh militants for its loss.

== Coverup ==
In 2003, Ranjit Nanda, a former inspector for the Central Bureau of Investigation, (CBI) turned whistleblower and revealed he was part of a five-member team which scrutinized the documents at the CBI's makeshift office at Amritsar's Youth Club. He revealed that officials from his department were "desperately looking for a purported letter written by Indira Gandhi, the then Prime Minister, to Jarnail Singh Bhindranwale", and reported seeing letters from the other leaders addressed to Sant Jarnail Singh Ji Khalsa Bhindranwale. Manjit Calcutta, a former secretary of the SGPC, corroborated Nanda's version of events but further alleged that the army set the library "on fire in desperation when it failed to find the letter". Nanda further confirmed the SGPC's version of events by describing how after inspecting each book and manuscript the CBI packed the documents into 165 numbered gunny sacks and bundled the material into waiting army vehicles because of a meeting of Sikh high priests taking place at the time. He also showed a letter from his superiors commending his work "during examination of documents from SGPC ".

== Efforts to recover the material ==
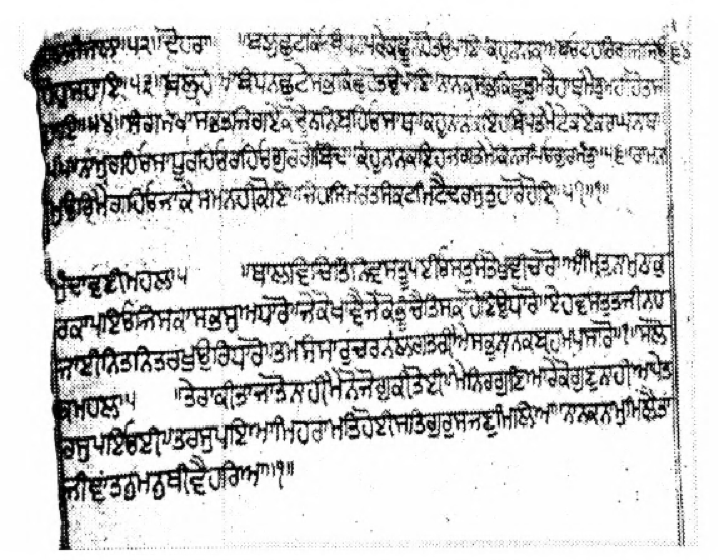
A manuscript of the Guru Granth Sahib of the Damdami recension which was reduced to ashes in 1984 (Operation Blue Star)

Since 1988, the SGPC has written to the Central Government asking for the return of the material taken by the CBI but has only received minor office files.

On 23 May 2000 George Fernandes wrote to the SGPC Secretary, Gurbachan Singh Bachan, and acknowledged that the Indian Army had taken the books and other documents from the Sikh Reference Library and handed them over to the CBI. He asked him to refer the matter to the Ministry of Personnel, Public Grievances and Pensions, whose jurisdiction the CBI falls under.

In a visit to Jalandhar, Punjab Fernandes announced that the CBI had destroyed 117 "seditious" documents from the material taken from the Sikh Reference Library.

On a visit to the Golden Temple on 25 March 2003, A. P. J. Abdul Kalam made an assurance that the books, documents, and manuscripts would be returned.

On 26 April 2004, the Punjab and Haryana High Court ordered the Central Government, Government of Punjab, and the CBI to return the "valuables, books, scriptures, paintings, etc, that were seized from the Golden Temple during “Operation Bluestar” in 1984".

In February and May 2009, A. K. Antony, defense minister of India, claimed in parliament that the Indian Army no longer had any material taken from the library. Various members of parliament and the SGPC criticized him for "misleading parliament".

In 2011, there was controversy regarding if a painting of Maharaja Ranjit Singh painted by Sobha Singh being sold by Sotheby's auction-house was the same original painting that had been kept at the Central Sikh Museum prior to its 1984 loss. However, the painting being sold may have been a replica and not the original, as the artist's signature was missing.

In a statement dated to 3 August 2018 as a response to a request-to-information inquiry, the Centre claimed it had returned confiscated items to the SGPC or Punjab Government already, stating: "About 4000 documents/books/files gold/gold ornaments, silver/silver ornaments, precious stone currency at sector were recovered by a central agency during Operation Blue Star in 1984. The articles and documents handed over either to SGPC or to the Government of Punjab." However, the SGPC denies the claim and claims the items were not returned to it.

== Revival ==
=== Restocking ===
The library was restored after the original and its collection was destroyed in Operation Blue Star. Its collection has been refilled due to community, institutional, and individual-based donations of literary works. The revived library continues in operation to the present. It has amassed a collection of 24,540 books according to a 2017 estimate. Estimates for individual types of other literary works is 550 Guru Granth Sahib manuscripts, 75 Dasam Granth manuscripts, and 1,300 general manuscripts. No issued edicts (hukamnama) signed by the Sikh Gurus have been recollected in the revived library.

=== Preservation ===
A special fumigation treatment chamber has been installed to preserve the works from insect and environmental damage.

=== Digitization ===
Digitization work began in 2008 and is being conducted to save the collection for posterity and to prevent a similar loss of its contents again. Digitization work first began under a private firm but this led to disappointments so the library started digitizing its own collection itself starting in 2013. As of September 2017, 4,000 works were fully digitized, with 15% of the entire stock being digitized since 2008. At the then rate of digitization using two cameras, one scanner, four lights, and other equipment, six books are transformed into PDF format weekly.

The literary collection of the library is planned to be available for online reading through a digital portal:

The digitisation process is under way. Till date, around 80 per cent of our prized possessions have been scanned and digitised. Our motive is to make these available online so that the devotees can access those on their mobile phones or PCs.

— Roop Singh, SGPC Chief Secretary

=== Relocation ===
The original library building is a small, two-story complex. A new building is being constructed at Bhai Gurdas Hall to rehouse the library in, as the current building in the Golden Temple complex is deemed too small to meet the needs of the growing collection. This has been opposed by some on the grounds that the original location is a witness to history of the events of Operation Blue Star and serves as a reminder for devotees of that episode.

There are also plans for the setting up of a building to be named Guru Granth Sahib Bhawan, where historical manuscripts of Sikh scriptures will be displayed for public viewing.

== See also ==
- Sikh History Research Centre
