= Teja Singh Samundri =

Indian Sikh leader

Teja Singh Samundri wearing military uniform

Teja Singh Samundri (1882–1926) was a Sikh religious reformer and one of the founder members of Shiromani Gurdwara Parbandhak Committee and played an important role in the Gurdwara reform movement.

== Biography ==
Samundri was born to Deva Singh and Nand Kaur on 20 February 1882 at Rai Ka Burj in Tarn Taran tehsil, Amritsar district, Punjab. His village was Chak 140 GB. He acquired the toponymic suffix Samundri after he shifted to Samundri in Lyallpur district. He was never formally educated past the primary-level. He served in the British Indian Army for three-and-a-half years, reaching the rank of Dafadar (junior commissioned officer) in the 22nd Cavalry.

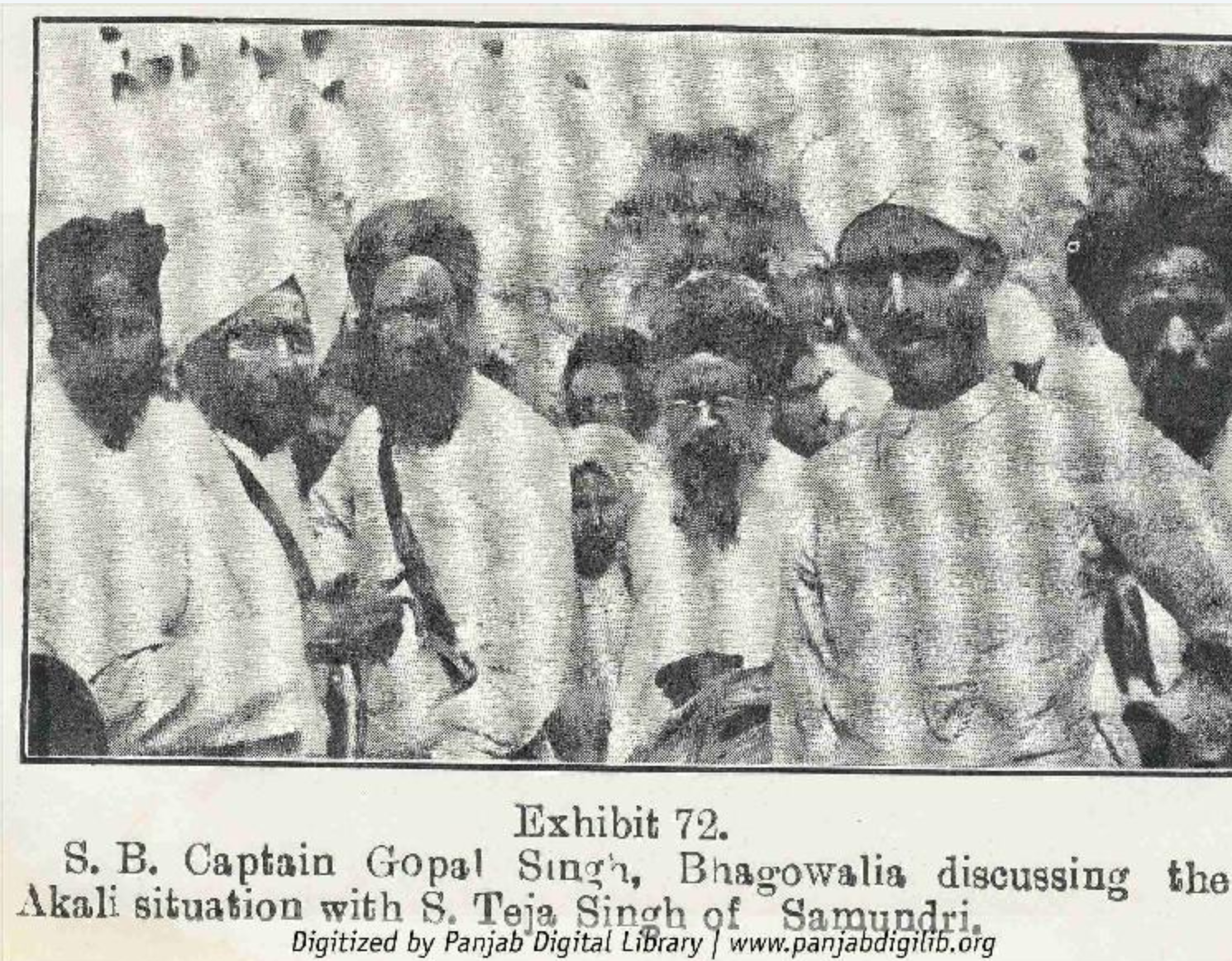
Teja Singh Samundri (far left) in discussion during Akali movement

After serving in the military, he returned to his native village and joined the Chief Khalsa Diwan. He then established two Khalsa schools, both located in Sarhali in the Amritsar district. He was also a founder of the Akali daily newspaper periodical. In 1920, Samundri became a founding member of the Shiromani Gurdwara Parbandhak Committee, where he later rose to the position of vice-president of the SGPC. In the aftermath of the Nankana massacre, the British handed-over control of the Nankana Sahib shrine to the reformist Sikhs, with Samundri becoming a member of the new management committee of Nankana Sahib. During the Akali movement, he was arrested for his role in the Chabian Da Morcha (lasting from November 1921 to January 1922) agitation by the British. He was arrested again on 13 October 1923 due to participating in a joint SGPC-Akali campaign to restore the recent reposed Maharaja Ripudaman Singh to the throne of Nabha State after his excommunication by the British. The British declared that the SGPC and Akali Dal were illegal entities, thus fifty-nine leaders of both organizations were arrested, including Teja Singh, being charged with "waging war against the King". He was shifted to Lahore Fort for his trail.

Teja Singh died in custody on 17 July 1926 due to a heart attack.

== Family ==
Teja Singh had a son named Bishan Singh, who was the founding vice-chancellor of Guru Nanak Dev University and also served as the principal of Khalsa College in Amritsar. Teja Singh's grandson is Taranjit Singh Sandhu.

== Legacy ==
The building that houses the headquarters of the SGPC within the Golden Temple complex in Amritsar is named Teja Singh Samundri Hall after him.
