= Karam Singh (historian) =

Indian historian (1884–1930)

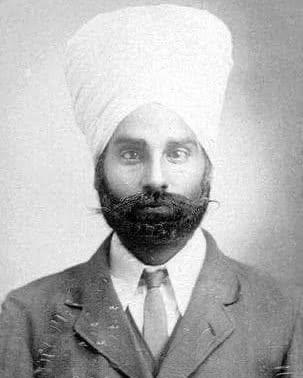
- Born: 18 March 1884; Jhabal, Punjab, British India
- Died: 18 September 1930 (aged 46); Amritsar, Punjab, India
- Education: F.Sc.
- Alma mater: Khalsa School Amritsar & Taran Taran, Khalsa College Amritsar
- Occupations: Historian, essay writer, writer, State Historian in Patiala State, Agriculturist
- Relatives: Father Jhanda Singh
- Writing career
- Language: Punjabi
- Period: 1899
- Notable works: Banda Bahadur (Punjabi, ਬੰਦਾ ਬਹਾਦਰ); Katak Ki Visakh (Punjabi, ਕਤਕ ਕਿ ਵਸਾਖ); Jeevan Harnaam Kaur (Punjabi, ਜੀਵਨ ਹਰਨਾਮ ਕੌਰ); Jeevan Sada Kaur (Punjabi, ਜੀਵਨ ਸਦਾ ਕੌਰ); Banda Kaun tha (Urdu, بندہ کون تھا؟); Maharaja Ala Singh (Punjabi, ਮਹਾਰਾਜਾ ਆਲਾ ਸਿੰਘ); Gurpurb Nirnay (Punjabi, ਗੁਰਪੁਰਬ ਨਿਰਣੈ); Amar Khalsa (Punjabi, ਅਮਰ ਖ਼ਾਲਸਾ); Gur Gatha (Punjabi, ਗੁਰ ਗਾਥਾ)

Karam Singh (18 March, 1884–18 September, 1930) was a Sikh historian.

== Early life ==
He was born in Jhabal, a town 8 kilometres (5 mi) south of Amritsar. His father Jhanda Singh belonged to a traditional Sikh family. Jhanda Singh took amrit from the group of Sant Atar Singh and named the child Karam Singh after Mehraj Singh.

== Education ==
Having studied primary school in Jhabaal, Middle from Khalsa Collegiate School, Amritsar, he attended Khalsa College, Amritsar for higher studies.

In 1902, Karam Singh joined Khalsa College, Amritsar for his F.Sc. studies. He enrolled into science as his subject but his passion for reading historical books turned into historical research. His close friends at the time were Amar Singh Vasu, Ma. Ishar Singh Dhotian, and Gurmukh Singh Dhotian. Karam Singh had good command in Punjabi, Hindi, Urdu, and English. In 1905, during his college time while he was nearing to complete his B.A. degree an idea struck him that since aged persons of Maharaja Ranjit Singh times will die soon or were dying from an ongoing plague, he should collect historic narrations from their mouth. He left college to pursue his interest in oral history.

== Research work ==
In the academic year 1905–06, near December, he dropped out of school against the will of his family members and friends, when he was about to complete his graduation in 3 months. There was no one to support his passion of collecting notes and references. Karam Singh travelled around the area to interview and record the statements of elderly people. He also visited many libraries in India for his research. He thought of purchasing daily diaries of Ranjit Singhs’ Darbar available with various sources but no one came to his support. In order to earn a livelihood, he learned the techniques of making blocks and successfully started a poster production business producing pictures of historic heroes and Sikh gurus. He also served Patiala State as Historian .

In spite of being a Sikh, he undertook a long travel to Baghdad by being dressed as Muslim. His intention was to travel to Mecca and collect some historic evidences for Guru Nanak's visit there. He was recognised by some of his co travellers and he had to come back from Baghdad. In order to support his expenses, he even purchased land and became a successful agriculturist. But simultaneously all along he kept writing articles on Sikh history in Phulwari monthly and published many books of great historic value. His health would later deteriorate, with him losing one of his eyes.

On 22 December 1929 at a meeting held at Akal Takht Amritsar, he established Sikh Historical Society of which he was its secretary. At the same time, the management of Khasa College wanted to establish Sikh History Research Department under him.

== Death ==
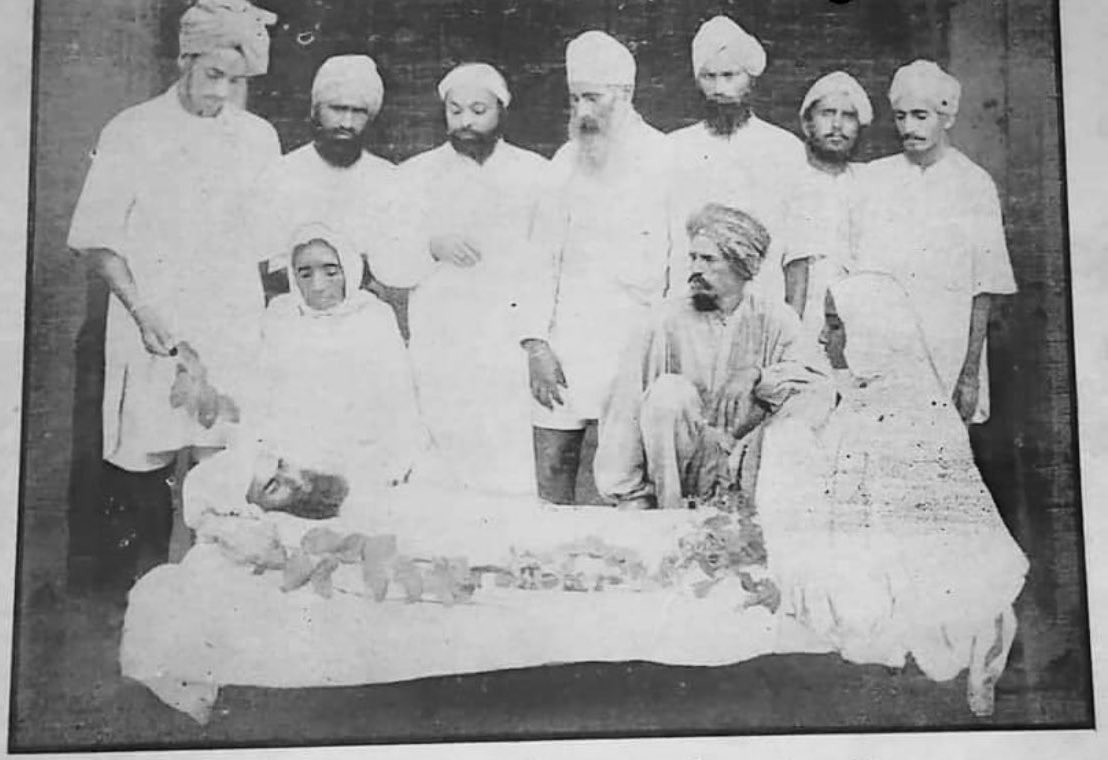
Post-mortem photograph of Sikh historian Karam Singh, with his corpse surrounded by others, circa September 1930

In August 1930, Karam Singh contracted malaria, which developed into pneumonia. He died of his illness on 10 September 1930. Other sources claim he died on 18 September 1930. Khalsa College established the Sikh History Research department at his bhog ceremony later.

== Contributions ==
He was a prolific author. He wrote extensively and his writings have reached us in the form of numerous notes, diary entries and manuscripts. Some of his published works are as under:

- Banda Bahadur (Punjabi, ਬੰਦਾ ਬਹਾਦਰ)
- Katak Ki Visakh (Punjabi, ਕਤਕ ਕਿ ਵਸਾਖ)
- Jeevan Harnaam Kaur (Punjabi, ਜੀਵਨ ਹਰਨਾਮ ਕੌਰ)
- Jeevan Sada Kaur (Punjabi, ਜੀਵਨ ਸਦਾ ਕੌਰ)
- Banda Kaun tha (Urdu, بندہ کون تھا؟)
- Maharaja Ala Singh (Punjabi, ਮਹਾਰਾਜਾ ਆਲਾ ਸਿੰਘ)
- Gurpurb Nirnay (Punjabi, ਗੁਰਪੁਰਬ ਨਿਰਣੈ)
- Amar Khalsa (Punjabi, ਅਮਰ ਖ਼ਾਲਸਾ)
- Gur Gatha (Punjabi, ਗੁਰ ਗਾਥਾ)
