= Khalsa College, Amritsar =

Higher education institution in Amritsar, India

Khalsa College
- Motto: ਅਕਾਲ ਸਹਾਇ (Gurmukhi); Akal Sahai "With God's Grace"
- Type: College
- Established: 1892; 134 years ago
- Principal: Dr. Atam Singh Randhawa
- Location: Amritsar, Punjab, India; 31.6339°N 74.8356°E
- Campus: Urban
- Website: khalsacollege.edu.in
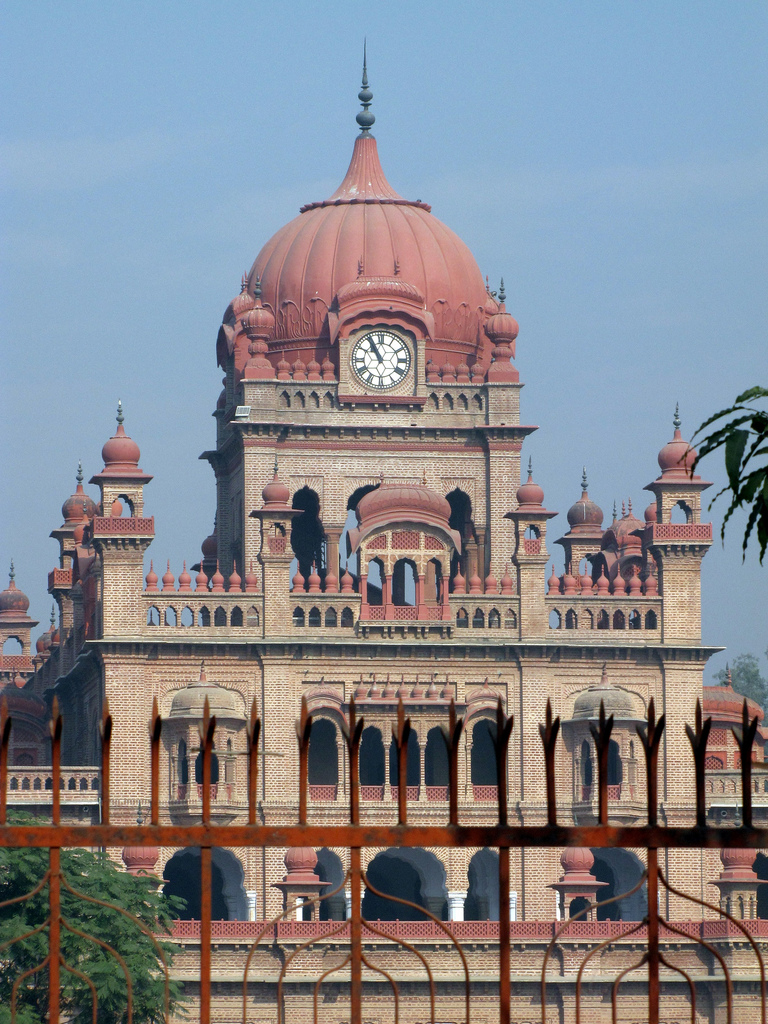

Khalsa College (Punjabi: ਖ਼ਾਲਸਾ ਕਾਲਜ khālsā kālaj) is a historic educational institution in the northern Indian city of Amritsar in the state of Punjab, India. Founded in 1892, the sprawling 300-acre (1.2 km^{2}) campus is located about eight kilometers from the city-center on the Amritsar-Lahore highway (part of the Grand Trunk Road), adjoining Guru Nanak Dev University campus, to which Khalsa College is academically affiliated.

Khalsa College was built as an educational institute during the British Raj in India when Sikh scholars thought about providing higher education to Sikhs and Punjabis within Punjab. Amritsar was chosen for its establishment and Singh Sabha Movement and Chief Khalsa Diwan approached the then Sikh Maharajas and Sikh people of Punjab to raise funds and donate land to build this unique institute. People of Amritsar, Lahore and other cities of Punjab including rich Sikh families and Maharajas donated land and raised funds to build Khalsa College, Amritsar. Its architectural design was created by Ram Singh, a famous architect who also designed one of the Places in England. Its building was completed in 1911–12. Its architectural features are mix of British, Mughal and Sikh architect.

== History ==
Khalsa College Establishment Committee was set up in 1890 with Colonel W. R. M. Holroyd, Director of Public Instruction, Punjab, as president, and W. Bell, Principal of Government College, Lahore, as secretary. Among the native constituents of this 121-member committee were Sir Attar Singh, Gurdial Singh Maan of Nabha, Diwan Gurmukh Singh of Patiala, Bhai Kahn Singh, Professor Gurmukh Singh and Sardar Jawahir Singh (1859–1910). Many princely states of British India and Sikh people of Punjab gave their financial help to the establishment of Khalsa College, including Maharaja Rajendra Singh of Patiala, Maharaja Hira Singh of Nabha, Maharaja Jagatjit Singh of Kapurthala and Sir Sunder Singh Majithia.

After a prolonged discussion about the site of Khalsa College, it was decided that one college would be established in Amritsar, followed by a second in Lahore. The 300-acre (1.2 km^{2}) campus was sited just outside the village of Kot Sayyad Mehmood, which was later renamed Kot Khalsa.

== Sikh History Research Centre ==
In 1930, a Sikh Research Centre was founded within the college of Ganda Singh, who headed it until 1947. The Sikh Research Centre of Khalsa College has since grown to encompass a library and art galleries, containing thousands of artefacts, books, manuscripts, and paintings related to Sikhs and Sikhism. The current collection is 6,397 books, 375 paintings, 601 manuscripts, newspapers dating back to 1904, 675 files/books/journals, coinage, historical photographs, and weaponry.

== Campus ==
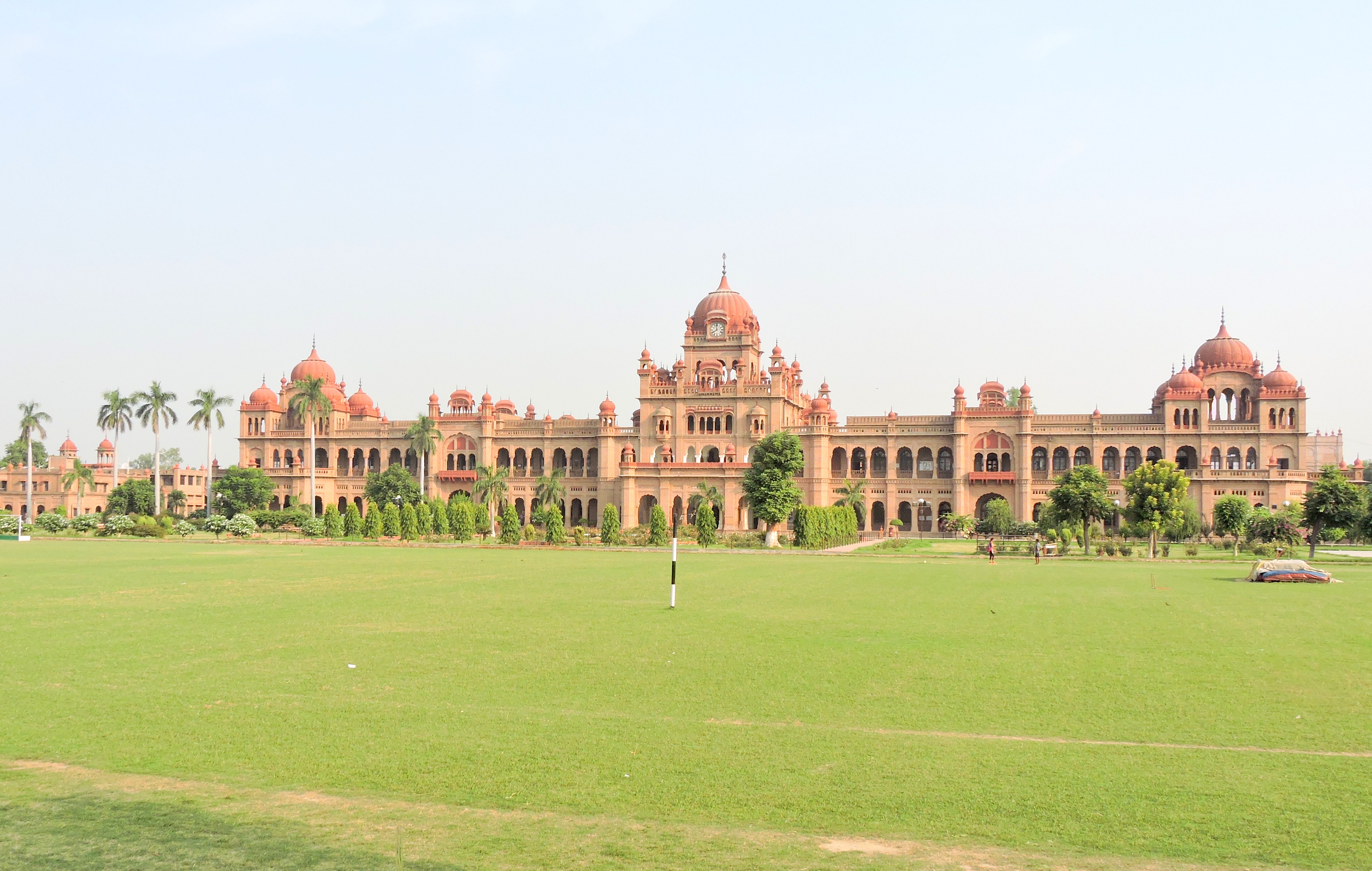
Khalsa College, Amritsar, Punjab, India

The main building is of the Indo-Sarcenic style, which is strongly influenced by traditional Indian and Mughal schools of architecture. The foundation stone was laid on 5 March 1892, with the first classes starting in 1893.

The college was designed by Bhai Ram Singh, principal of the Mayo School of Arts, Lahore, with the help of engineer Dharam Singh Gharjakhia. Bhai Ram Singh was decorated for his services with the Member of the Victorian Order (MVO), the highest civilian award of British India.

== Faculties ==
Khalsa College has following faculties:

- Faculty of Humanities and Social Sciences
- Faculty of Commerce and Business Administration
- Faculty of Sciences
- College of Agriculture

== Institutes ==
The institutions under Khalsa College Charitable Society, which is running the century-old Khalsa College:

Colleges-

- Khalsa College, Amritsar-India (established.1892)
- Khalsa College of Education, Amritsar (established.1954)
- Khalsa College for Women, Amritsar (established.1968)
- Khalsa College of Education, Ranjit Avenue, Amritsar (established.2006)
- Khalsa College of Nursing, Amritsar (established.2006)
- Khalsa College of Pharmacy, Amritsar (established.2009)
- Khalsa College of Engineering & Tech., Ranjit Avenue, Amritsar (established.2009)
- Khalsa College of Veterinary and Animal Sciences, Amritsar (established.2009)
- Khalsa College (Amritsar) of Technology & Business Studies, Mohali (established.2009)
- Khalsa College of Physical Education, VPO Heir, District. Amritsar (established.2009)
- Khalsa College Chawinda Devi, Amritsar
- Khalsa College of Law, Amritsar
- Khalsa College of Management & Technology, Amritsar

Schools-

- Khalsa College Sr. Sec. School (Boys), Amritsar (established. 1892)
- Khalsa College Sr. Sec. School (Girls), Amritsar (established. 1942)
- Khalsa College Public School, Amritsar Amritsar (established. 1984)
- Khalsa College International Public School, Ranjit Avenue, Amritsar (established. 2001)
- Khalsa College Public School, Heir, Amritsar (established. 2008)

== Notable alumni ==
- Amrinder Gill, actor and singer
- Bhai Amrik Singh, President of AISSF
- Bhisham Sahni, filmmaker and writer
- Bishen Singh Bedi, former captain of the Indian cricket team
- Darbara Singh, former Chief Minister of Punjab and national-level leader of the Congress
- Dev Meena, pole vaulter
- Gurbachan Singh Randhawa, athlete
- Gurdial Singh Dhillon, former Speaker of the Indian Parliament
- Gurshabad, Playback singer, actor, and performer
- Gursharan Singh (1929 – 2011), theatre director and playwright
- Hans Raj Khanna, former Judge of the Supreme Court of India who authored the basic structure doctrine
- Harcharan Singh, Punjabi playwright
- Hardeep Tauo Toganwalia, Captain of the Canadian Kabaddi Team
- Harpreet Sandhu (actor), actor
- Hukam Singh, former Speaker of the Indian Parliament
- Jaswant Singh Gill (1939–2019), Sarvottam Jeevan Raksha Padak awardee, mining engineer at Coal India, known for 1989 Raniganj rescue
- Karaj Gill, film producer
- Khem Singh Gill, geneticist and former vice chancellor of Punjab Agricultural University
- Kidar Sharma, film director and screenwriter
- Lt. Col. Sarbjit Singh Kalha, DSO, officer in the British Indian Army
- Major General Gurbakhsh Singh, DSO, OBE, Indian Army officer, Padma Shri awardee
- Major General Rajinder Singh "Sparrow" Shergill, MVC & bar, Indian Army officer
- Maninder Singh, Captain of the Pro Kabaddi League franchise Bengal Warriors
- Manohar Singh Gill, former Chief Election Commissioner of India
- Mulk Raj Anand, novelist
- Pratap Singh Kairon, former Chief Minister of Punjab
- Rajkavi Inderjeet Singh Tulsi, Poet, Author, and Bollywood Lyricist
- Ranjit Bawa, Punjabi singer
- Sohan Singh Josh (1898–1970), socialist leader of Punjab
- Teja Singh Samundri (1882–1926), founder of SGPC - Shiromani Gurudwara Prabhandhak Committee

=== Hockey players ===
- Balbir Singh Sr.
- Harbinder Singh

== Gallery ==
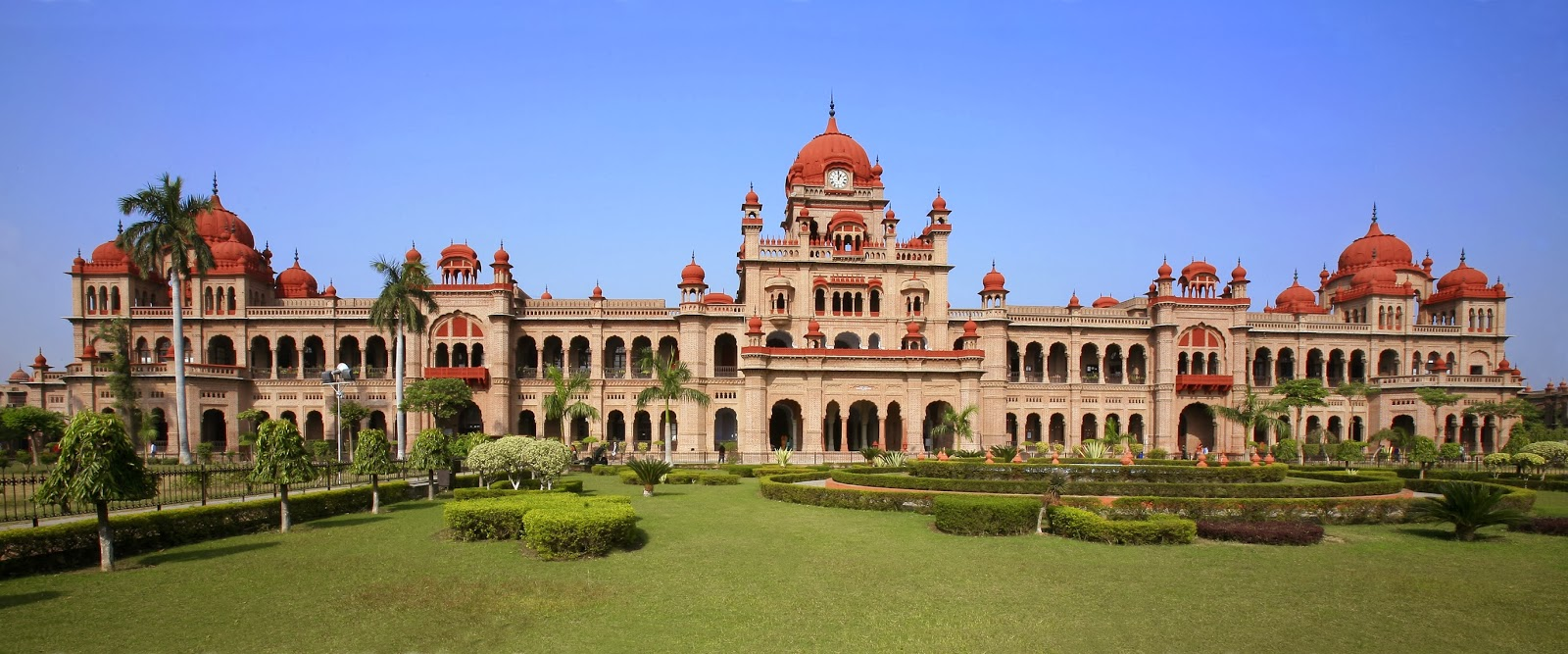
Khalsa College, Amritsar

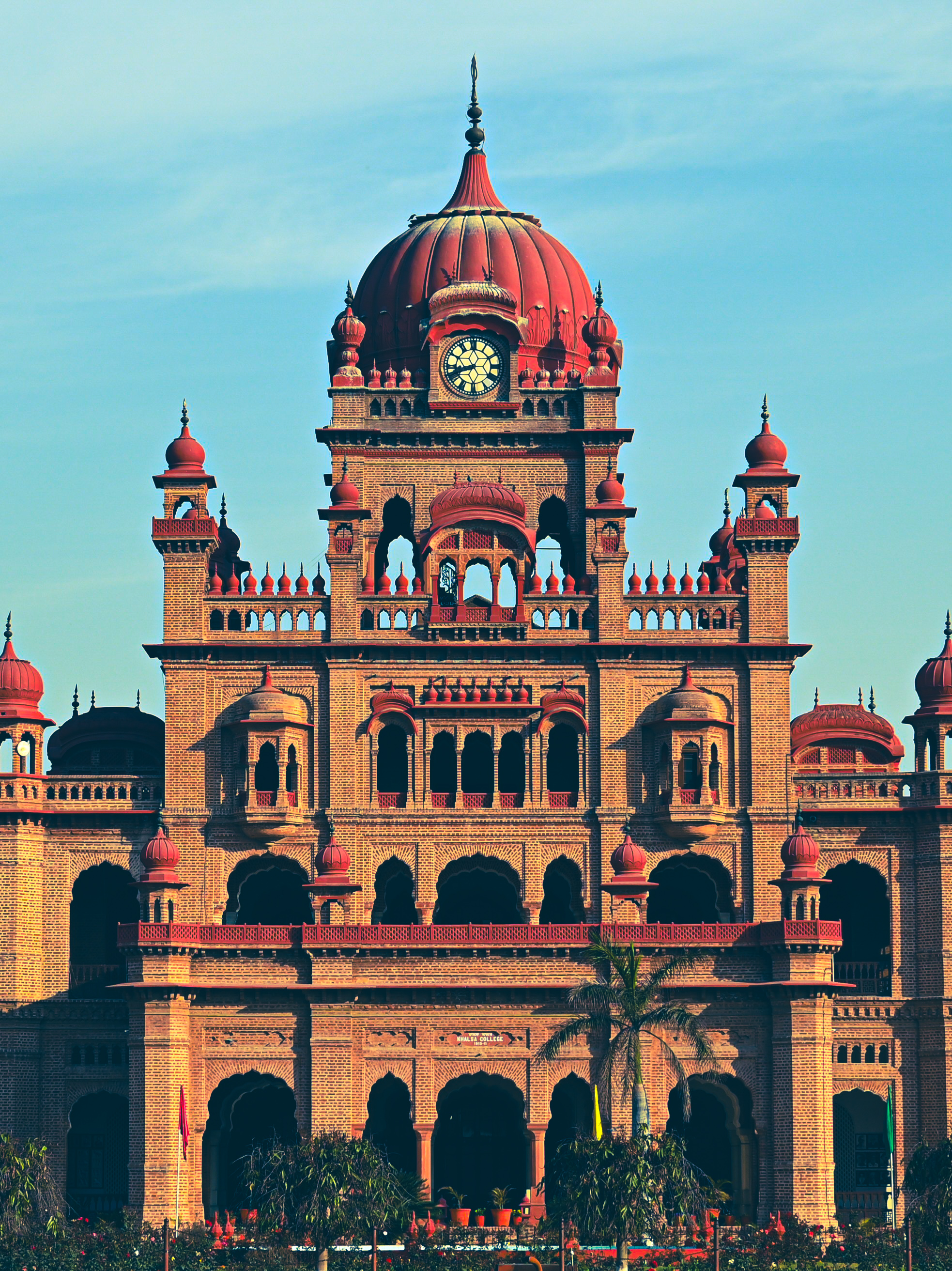
Khalsa College Clock Tower

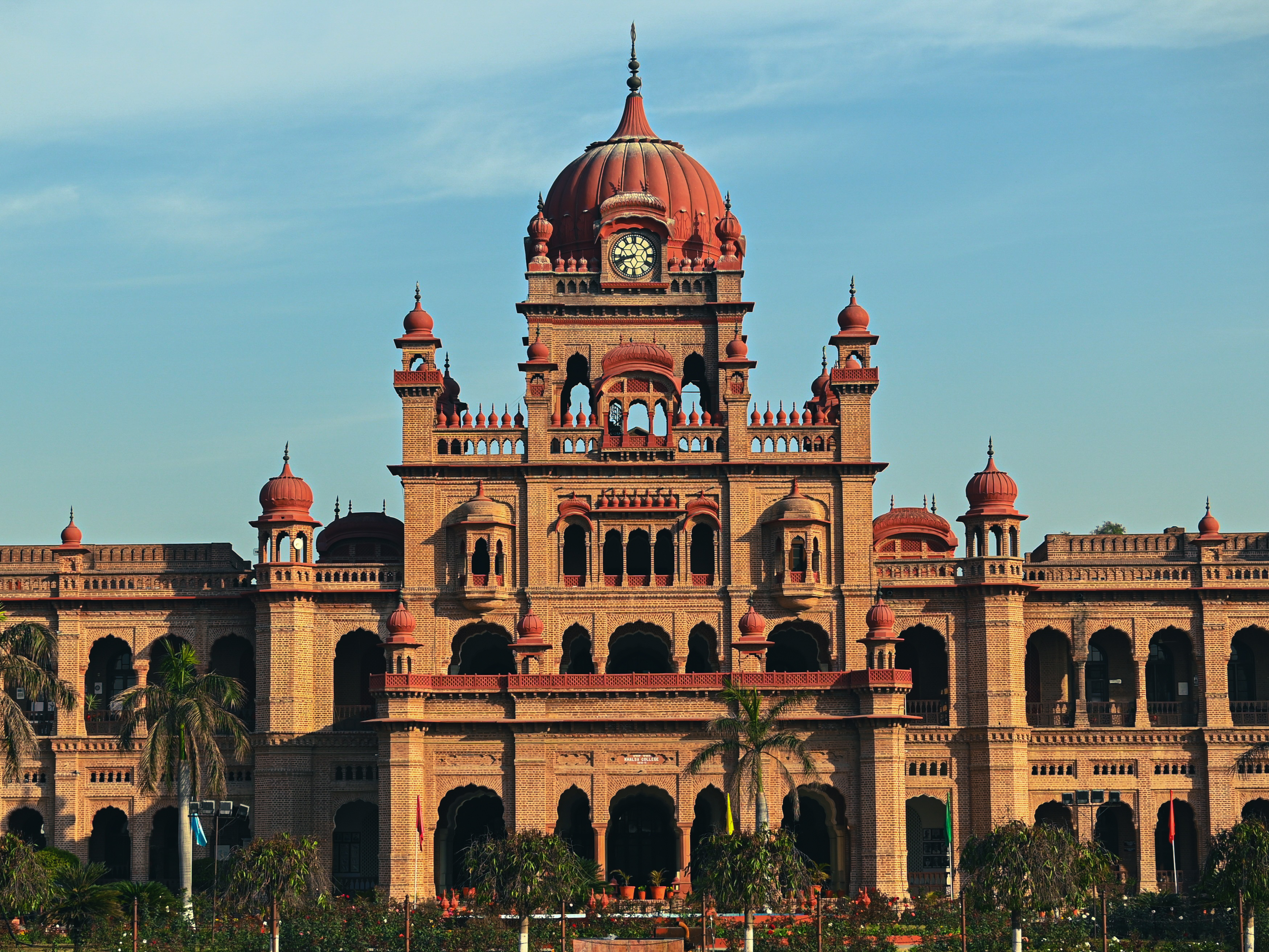
Front View Khalsa College

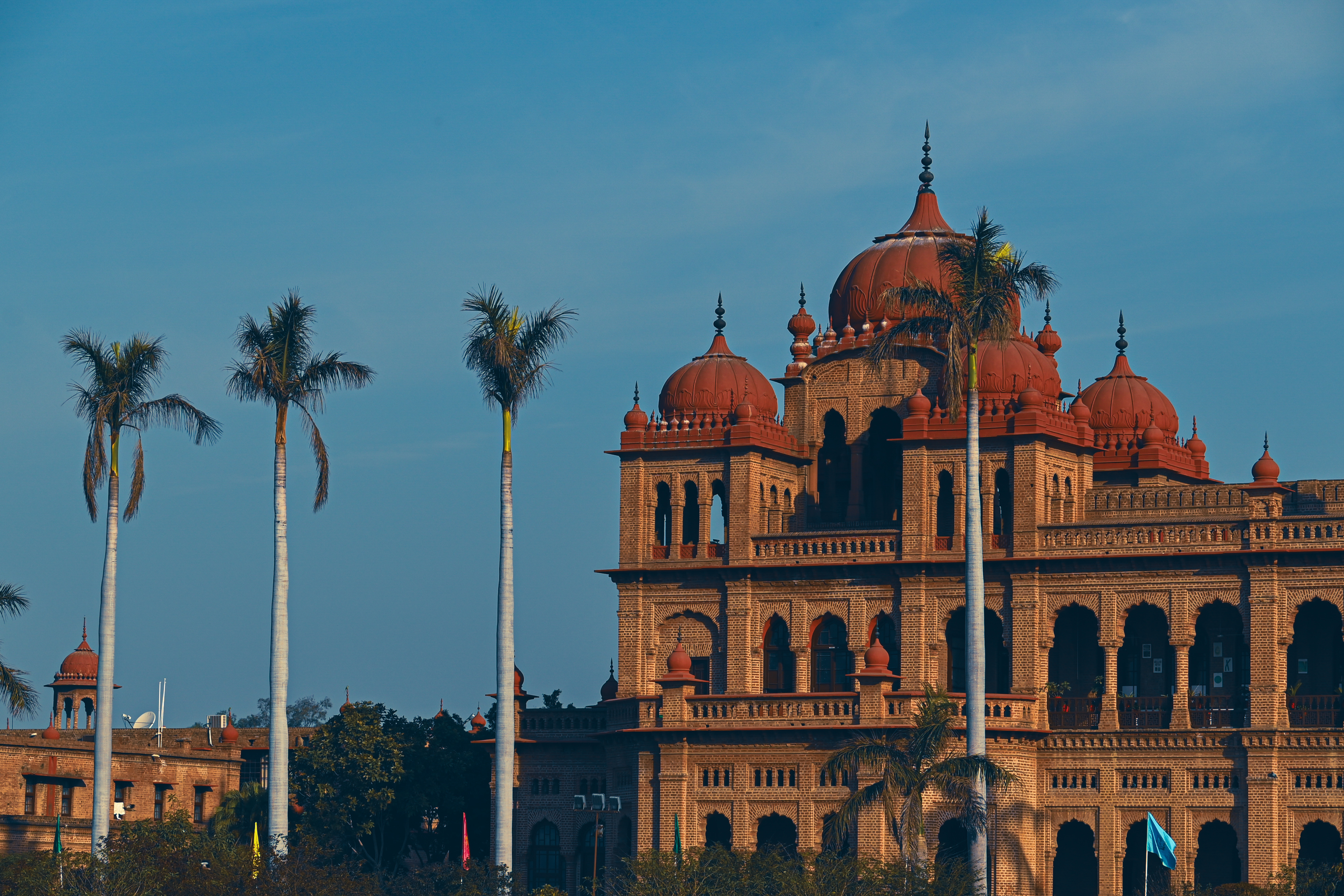
Khalsa College

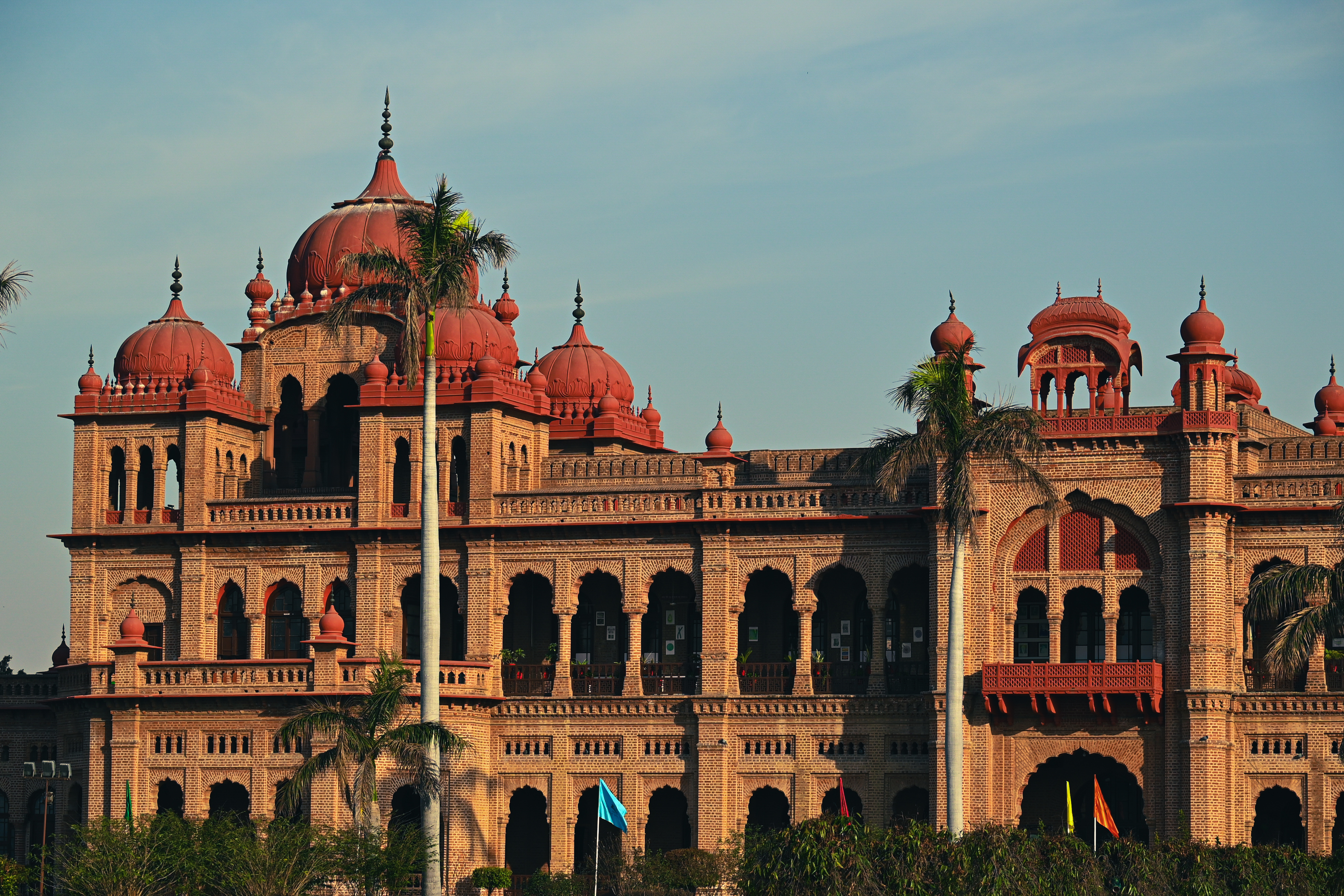
Khalsa College

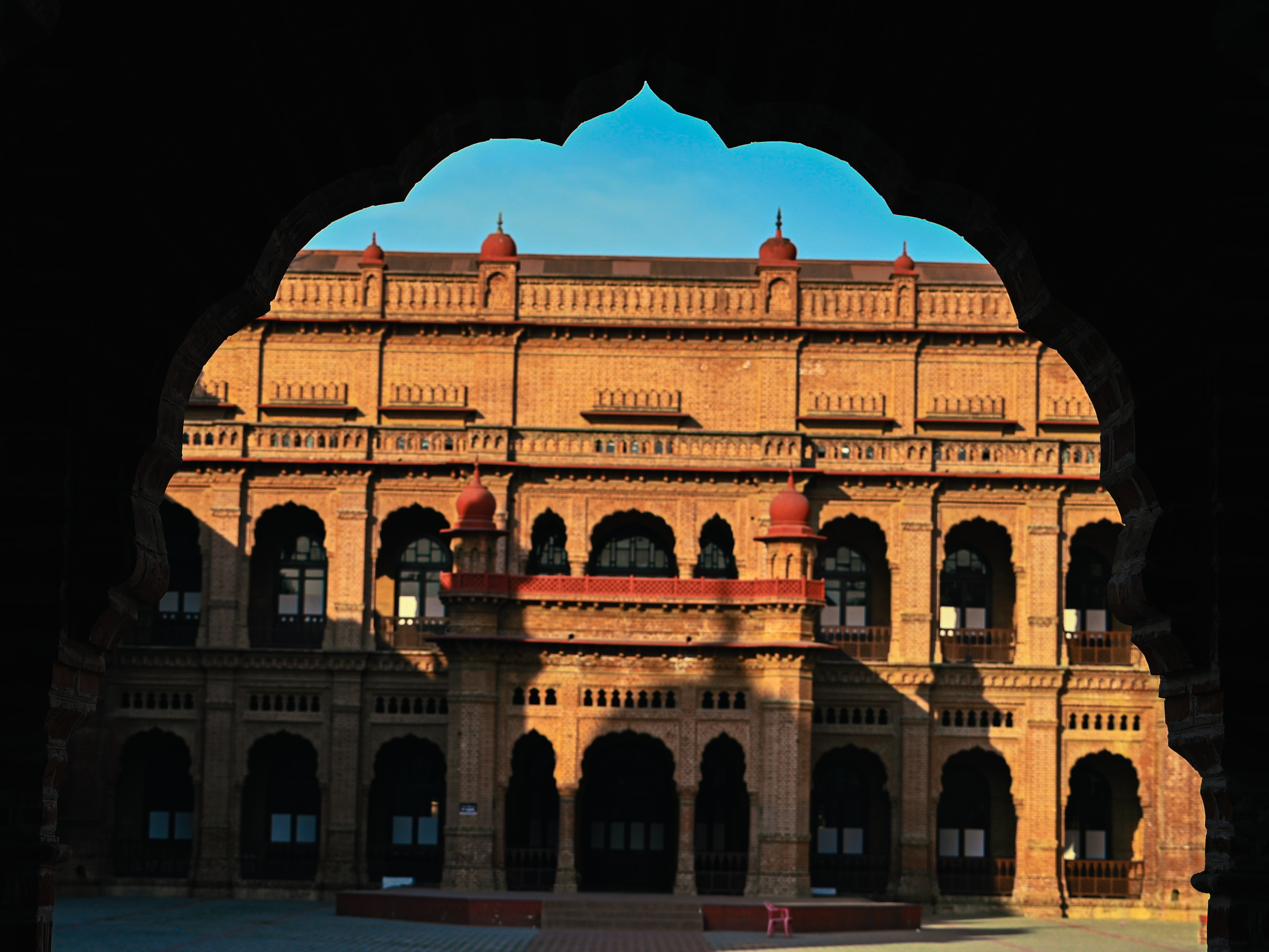
Khalsa College
