= Sikh History Research Centre =

Research institute established in 1930

Coordinates: 31.635066°N 74.834911°E

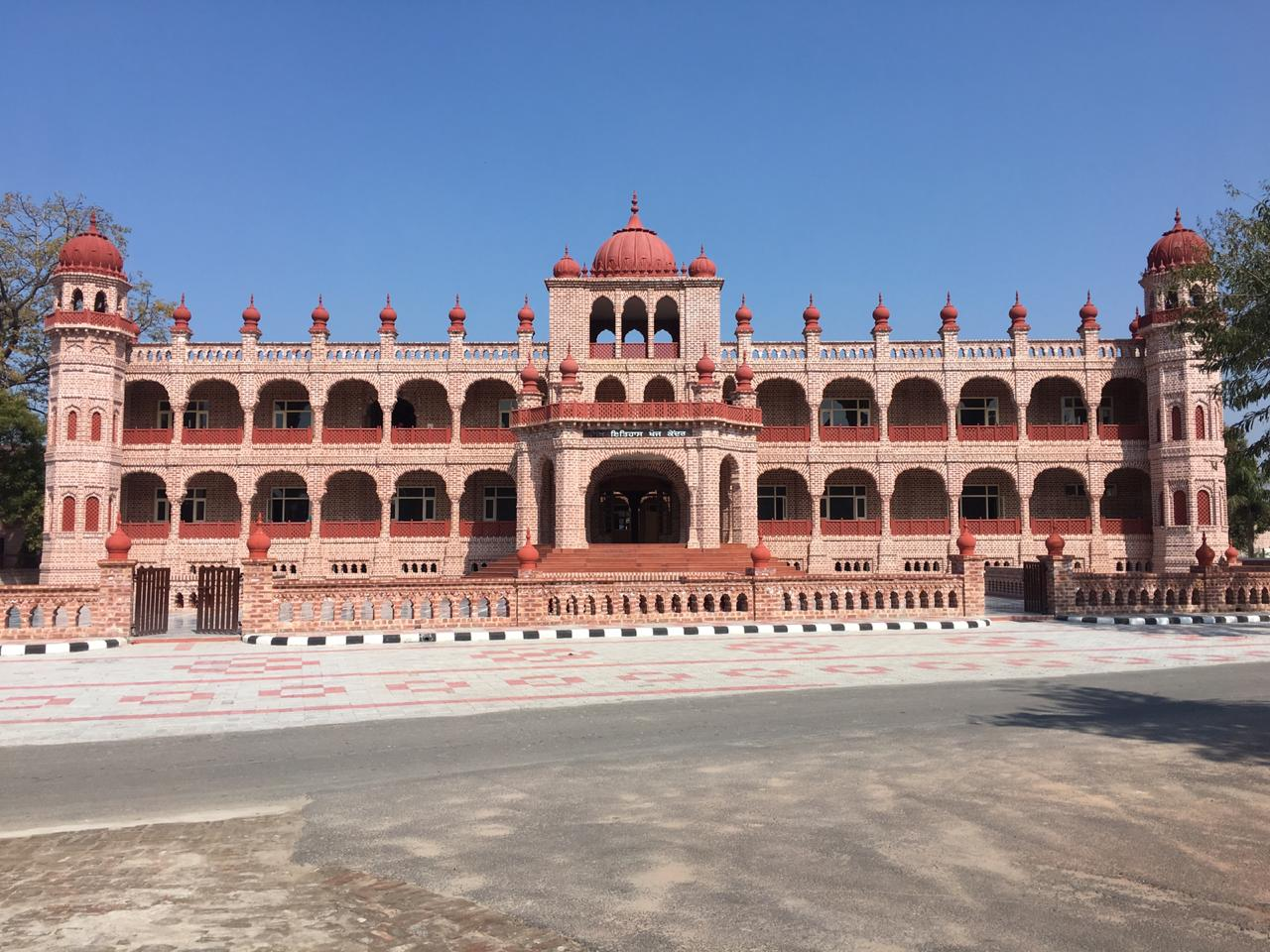
- Established: 1930
- Head: Dr. Kuldip Singh Dhillon
- Location: Amritsar, Punjab, India
- Website: Official website

The management committee of Khalsa College Amritsar created the Sikh History Research Centre in 1930 to write and publish the Sikh history from a modern historical perspective.

== History ==
In 1930, a Sikh Research Centre was founded within the college of Ganda Singh, who headed it until 1947. The Sikh Research Centre of Khalsa College has since grown to encompass a library and art galleries, containing thousands of artefacts, books, manuscripts, and paintings related to Sikhs and Sikhism.

Karam Singh was to be given the lead role in creating this centre by the committee. However, due to his sudden demise, the centre was started instead as the Sikh History Department under Khalsa College by S. Jagat Singh and subsequently taken over by Dr. Ganda Singh on 20 October 1931.

On 7 February 2019, a new building for the centre was inaugurated. There are five galleries displaying Sikh artefacts and artwork housed at the centre.

The current collection is 6,397 books, 375 paintings, 601 manuscripts, newspapers dating back to 1904, 675 files/books/journals, coinage, historical photographs, and weaponry.

== Centre resources ==
In this centre, historic resources relating to Sikh history are available, beginning with the time period of Guru Nanak up to the present. These resources are in languages including Persian, Punjabi, and English.

Generally, these have been collected by obtaining copies from Khudabakksh Library Patna, Rampur Raja Library Rampur (U.P.), Salarjung Museum Hyderabad, Sindhis office Puna, and the Jaipur State Archives department, as well as, from abroad, the India Office Library London.

== Centre library ==
The Centre library contains approximately 7000 rare books.

Apart from these, there are another 601 manuscripts, including 207 in Punjabi, 219 in Persian, 123 in English, 41 in Urdu, and 11 in Sanskrit and Hindi. There are volumes of Punjabi magazines like Phulwari, Gurmat Parkash and the English magazine Sikh Review, from 1904–1988, and 35 bound volumes of proceedings of the Sikh History Conference.

Also starting in 1904, there are 380 files of English, Punjabi, Urdu, and Hindi newspapers from the Punjab region. Ninety files of selected newspaper cuttings are also available and 35 bindings are preserved of the in-house magazine of Khalsa College. The centre also houses a collection of old coins, armaments, paintings, and other items of historical importance.

For the facilitation of research scholars, the Centre has undertaken the task of conserving rare documents. Over 325000 pages have already been digitized at the Centre as part of its first phase of a broader digitization project.

Restoration of manuscripts is an ongoing, in-house project. Digitization of paintings and art effects will be completed sometime in the future, and numerous articles are already on display in various galleries that were set up in new the building of the Centre in December 2018.

== Publications ==
The Sikh History Research Centre has generated twenty-five publications to date, including:

1. An Historical Account of Bhai Vasti Ram & Bhai Ram Singh
2. A Short Life Sketch of Maharaja Ala Singh
3. A Catalogue of Punjabi and Urdu Manuscripts
4. A Catalogue of Persian and Sanskrit Manuscripts
5. History of Khalsa College
6. Dr. Ganda Singh Journal of Sikh Historical & Religious Studies
7. Sardar Sundar Singh Majithia: Life Work & Mission
8. A Brief History of Khalsa College Amritsar (1892–2003)
9. Jangnama Qazi Noor Muhammad - Dr. Ganda Singh (Ed.)

== List of heads ==
List of heads of the Sikh History Research Centre
No.	Name	Term
1.	Ganda Singh	1931-1949
2.	Kirpal Singh	1949-1965
3.	Parkash Singh	1965-1981
4.	Davinder Singh Vidyarthi	1981-1990
5.	Gurdev Singh Deol	1990-1996
6.	Kulwinder Singh Bajwa	1996-2007
7.	Inderjit Singh Gogoani	2007-2017
8.	Kuldip Singh	2017-2021
9.	Joginder Singh	2021-2022
10.	Hardev Singh	2022-present

== See also ==
- Sikh Missionary College
- Sikh Reference Library
- History of Sikhism
