= Outline of Punjab, India =

Overview of and topical guide to Punjab, India

Location of Punjab

The following outline is provided as an overview of and topical guide to Punjab:

Punjab – state in North India, forming part of the larger Punjab region. The state is bordered by the Indian states of Jammu and Kashmir to the north, Himachal Pradesh to the east, Haryana to the south and southeast, Rajasthan to the southwest, and the Pakistani province of Punjab to the west. The state capital is located in Chandigarh, a Union Territory and also the capital of the neighbouring state of Haryana. After the partition of India in 1947, the Punjab province of British India was divided between India and Pakistan. The Indian Punjab was divided in 1966 with the formation of the new states of Haryana and Himachal Pradesh alongside the current state of Punjab. Punjab is the only Sikh majority state in India.

Seal of Punjab

== General reference ==
=== Names ===
- Common English name: Punjab
  - Pronunciation: /pʌnˈdʒɑːb/
- Official English name(s): Punjab
- Nickname(s):
- Adjectival(s): Punjabi
- Demonym(s): Punjabis

=== Rankings (amongst India's states) ===
- by population: 16th
- by area (2011 census): 20th
- by crime rate (2015): 24th
- by gross domestic product (GDP) (2014): 14th
- by Human Development Index (HDI):
- by life expectancy at birth:
- by literacy rate:

== Geography of Punjab, India ==
Geography of Punjab, India

- Punjab is: an Indian state
- Population of Punjab, India:
- Area of Punjab, India:
- Atlas of Punjab

=== Location of Punjab, India ===
- Punjab is situated within the following regions:
  - Northern Hemisphere
  - Eastern Hemisphere
    - Eurasia
      - Asia
        - South Asia
          - India
            - North India
          - Punjab region
- Time zone: Indian Standard Time (UTC+05:30)

=== Environment of Punjab, India ===
==== Natural geographic features of Punjab, India ====
- Lakes in Punjab, India
  - Harike Wetland
  - Kanjli Wetland
  - Ropar Wetland

=== Regions of Punjab, India ===
Regions of Punjab, India

- Majha
- Malwa
- Doaba
- Powadh

==== Administrative divisions of Punjab, India ====
===== Districts of Punjab, India =====
Districts of Punjab, India

- Amritsar district
- Barnala district
- Bathinda district
- Faridkot district
- Fatehgarh Sahib district
- Fazilka district
- Firozpur district
- Gurdaspur district
- Hoshiarpur district
- Jalandhar district
- Kapurthala district
- Ludhiana district
- Mansa district
- Moga district
- Mohali district
- Pathankot district
- Patiala district
- Rupnagar district
- Sangrur district
- Shahid Bhagat Singh Nagar district
- Sri Muktsar Sahib district
- Tarn Taran district

===== Municipalities of Punjab, India =====
- Capital of Punjab: Chandigarh – Union Territory, and not part of Punjab. It also serves as the capital of Haryana.
- Cities of Punjab, India
  - Ludhiana
  - Amritsar
  - Jalandhar
  - Patiala
  - Bathinda
  - Hoshiarpur
  - Mohali
  - Batala
  - Pathankot
  - Moga

=== Demography of Punjab, India ===
Demographics of Punjab, India

== Government and politics of Punjab, India ==
Politics of Punjab

- Form of government: Indian state government (parliamentary system of representative democracy)
- Capital of Punjab: Chandigarh acts as the shared capital of the Indian states of Haryana and Punjab
- Elections in Punjab, India
- Political issues in Punjab, India
  - Punjabi nationalism

=== Union government in Punjab, India ===
- Rajya Sabha members from Punjab
- Punjab Pradesh Congress Committee
- Indian general election, 2009 (Punjab)
- Indian general election, 2014 (Punjab)

=== Branches of the government of Punjab, India ===
Government of Punjab, India

==== Executive branch of the government of Punjab, India ====
- Head of state: Governor of Punjab, India,
- Head of government: Chief Minister of Punjab, India
- Council of Ministers of Punjab, India: For a list, see the article about the government of Punjab, India

==== Legislative branch of the government of Punjab, India ====
Punjab Legislative Assembly

- Constituencies of Punjab Legislative Assembly

==== Judicial branch of the government of Punjab, India ====
- Punjab and Haryana High Court
  - Chief Justice of Punjab, India: For a list, see the article about the High Court

=== Law and order in Punjab, India ===
- Human rights in Punjab, India
  - Punjab Legal Services Authority
- Law enforcement in Punjab, India
  - Punjab Police (India)

== History of Punjab, India ==
History of Punjab, India

- History of the Punjab

=== History of Punjab, by period ===
==== Ancient Punjab, India ====
- King Porus

==== Medieval Punjab, India ====
- Pre-Ghaznavid history of Punjab

== Culture of Punjab, India ==
Culture of Punjab, India

- Aawat pauni
- Architecture of Punjab, India
- Calendars in Punjab, India
  - Punjabi calendar
  - Nanakshahi calendar
  - Bikrami calendar
- Monuments in Punjab
  - Monuments of National Importance in Punjab, India
  - State Protected Monuments in Punjab, India
- Punjabi wedding traditions
- World Heritage Sites in Punjab

=== Art in Punjab, India ===
- Art in Punjab, India
- Cinema of Punjab, India
  - Punjabi cinema
    - Indian Punjabi films
    - Punjabi-language films
- Dance of Punjab, India
  - Folk dances of Punjab
    - Bhangra
- Literature of Punjab, India
  - Punjabi literature
    - Punjabi authors
    - Punjabi folklore
    - Punjabi Wikipedia
- Music of Punjab
  - Bhangra
  - Folk music
  - Punjabi singers
- Television in Punjab, India
  - Punjabi-language television channels
- Theatre in Punjab, India

=== Cuisine of Punjab, India ===
- Cuisine of Punjab, India
  - Punjabi cuisine
    - Punjabi bhathi
    - Punjabi dhaba – roadside restaurant or cafe featuring Punjabi cuisine
    - Punjabi tandoor
    - Sattu

=== Dress in Punjab, India ===
- Punjabi clothing
  - Jutti
  - Patiala salwar
  - Phulkari
  - Punjabi ghagra
  - Punjabi Tamba and Kurta
  - Salwar (Punjabi) Suit

=== Fairs and festivals in Punjab, India ===
Fairs and festivals in Punjab, India

- Punjabi festivals
  - Lohri
  - Basant Kite Festival (Punjab)
  - Maghi
  - Holi, Punjab
  - Teeyan
  - Rakhri
  - Vaisakhi
- Religious festivals
  - Hindu Punjabi Festivals
  - Hindu festivals in the Punjab
  - Sikh festivals

=== Languages in Punjab, India ===
- Punjabi language
  - Alphabets used to write Punjabi
    - Shahmukhi alphabet (used mostly by Muslims)
    - Gurmukhī alphabet (used mostly by Sikhs and Hindus)
  - Punjabi dialects
    - Eastern Punjabi
  - Punjabi grammar
  - History of the Punjabi language

=== People of Punjab, India ===
- Punjabis
  - Punjabi diaspora
  - Punjabi Hindus
  - Punjabi Muslims
  - Rajputs
  - Punjabi tribes
- People from Punjab, India

=== Religion in Punjab, India ===
Religion in Punjab, India

- Buddhism in Punjab, India
- Christianity in Punjab, India
- Hinduism in Punjab, India
- Islam in Punjab, India
- Punjabi folk religion
  - Sanjhi
  - Gugga
  - Chhapar Mela
  - Sakhi Sarwar Saint
  - Punjabi fasts
- Sikhism in Punjab, India

=== Sports in Punjab, India ===
Sports in Punjab, India

- Cricket in Punjab, India
  - Punjab Cricket Association
  - Punjab cricket team (India)
- Football in Punjab, India
  - Punjab Football Association
  - Punjab football team
- Kila Raipur Sports Festival
- Punjabi Kabaddi

=== Symbols of Punjab, India ===
Symbols of Punjab, India

- State animal:
- State bird:
- State flower:
- State seal: Seal of Punjab, India
- State tree:

== Economy and infrastructure of Punjab, India ==
Economy of Punjab, India

- Agriculture in Punjab, India
- Banking in Punjab, India
- Communications in Punjab, India
  - Internet in Punjab, India
  - Punjabi-language newspapers
- Companies of Punjab, India
- Currency of Punjab:
- Economic history of Punjab, India
- Health care in Punjab, India
- Mining in Punjab, India
- Punjab Stock Exchange
- Tourism in Punjab, India
- Water supply and sanitation in Punjab, India
  - Canals in Punjab, India
    - Sutlej Yamuna link canal
    - Indira Gandhi Canal
    - Buddha Nullah Sirhind Canal

=== Energy in Punjab, India ===
- Hydro-electric power stations in Punjab, India
  - Bhakra Hydro-electric power station
  - Shanan Hydro-electric power station
  - Shang Hydro-electric power station
- Thermal power stations in Punjab, India
  - Bhatinda thermal power station
  - Rover thermal power station
  - Dehar thermal power station
  - Gurunanak thermal project

=== Transport in Punjab, India ===
Transport in Punjab, India

- Airports in Punjab, India
- Rail transport in Punjab, India
  - Railways in Punjab, India
    - Rail Coach Factory, Kapurthala
    - Patiala Locomotive Works, Patiala
- Vehicular transport in Punjab, India
  - State highways in Punjab, India
  - Bridges in Punjab, India
    - Ravi bridge (Pathankot & Jammu): Length: 2,800 feet.
    - Alegjandria bridge (Chenab river): Length: 9,088 feet.
    - Sutlej bridge (Sutlej river): Length: 4,210 feet.

== Education in Punjab, India ==
Education in Punjab, India

- Punjab School Education Board
- Institutions of higher education in Punjab, India
  - Punjabi University

== Health in Punjab, India ==
- Health in Punjab, India
- COVID-19 pandemic in Punjab, India

== See also ==
- Outline of India
