= List of Hindu festivals in Punjab =

This list of Punjabi Hindu festivals summarizes festivals observed in Punjab. These are based on the Bikrami calendar. The festivals of Maghi and Vaisakhi are determined by the solar aspect and others on its lunar months.

== Observance and overview ==
Punjabi Hindus follow the Bikrami calendar to observe religious festivals.

== List and descriptions of major Hindu Punjabi festivals ==
Major Hindu Punjabi Festival	Date Observed (from year to year dates vary)	Description
Maghi	January 14	This festival commemorates Uttarayan and is the Punjabi name for Makara Sankranti.
Holi	March/Phalgun Purnima	Spring festival of colours.
Rama Navami	Chaitra	Celebrates birth of Lord Rama.
Hanuman Jayanti	March/Chaitra Purnima	In honour of Lord Hanuman.
Maha Shivratri	Varies, February–March	In honour of Lord Shiva.
Vaisakhi	April 13/Vaisakh	Punjabi new year. Falls on Mesha Sankranti.
Rakhri (Raksha Bandhan)	Sawan full moon	Brothers and sisters day.
Krishna Janmashtami	Shravana, Krishna Paksha, Ashtami	Celebrates the birth of Lord Krishna.
Sanjhi	Varies	To honour the Mother Goddess.
Śrāddha	Second half of the month Bhadrapada	Remember ancestors.
Navratri	The tenth day of the lunar month Ashwin	To honour the Goddess Durga.
Dussehra	the tenth day of the lunar month Ashwin	Celebrated defeat of Ravana by Lord Rama.
Diwali	Kartik new moon	Celebrates return of Lord Rama and Sita to Ayodhya.
Vishwakarma Puja	Day after Kartik new moon	Reverence to Vishwakarma, the God of architecture.
Bhai Dooj known in Punjab/ Jammu as Tikka	Second Day of bright half of Kartik month	Brothers are sisters day celebrated two days after Diwali.
Karwa Chauth	Fourth day after Kartik full moon	Women fast for the well being of their husbands and pray to the moon.
Kartik Poornima	Full moon of Kartik	A Fair is held at Ram Tirath Mandir in Amritsar where the sons of Lord Rama, Luv and Kush are believed to have been born.

== Other festivals ==
In addition to the above, Punjabi Hindus observe other Punjabi festivals such as, Basant Festival of Kites, Lohri, Teej and Gugga.

== Gallery ==
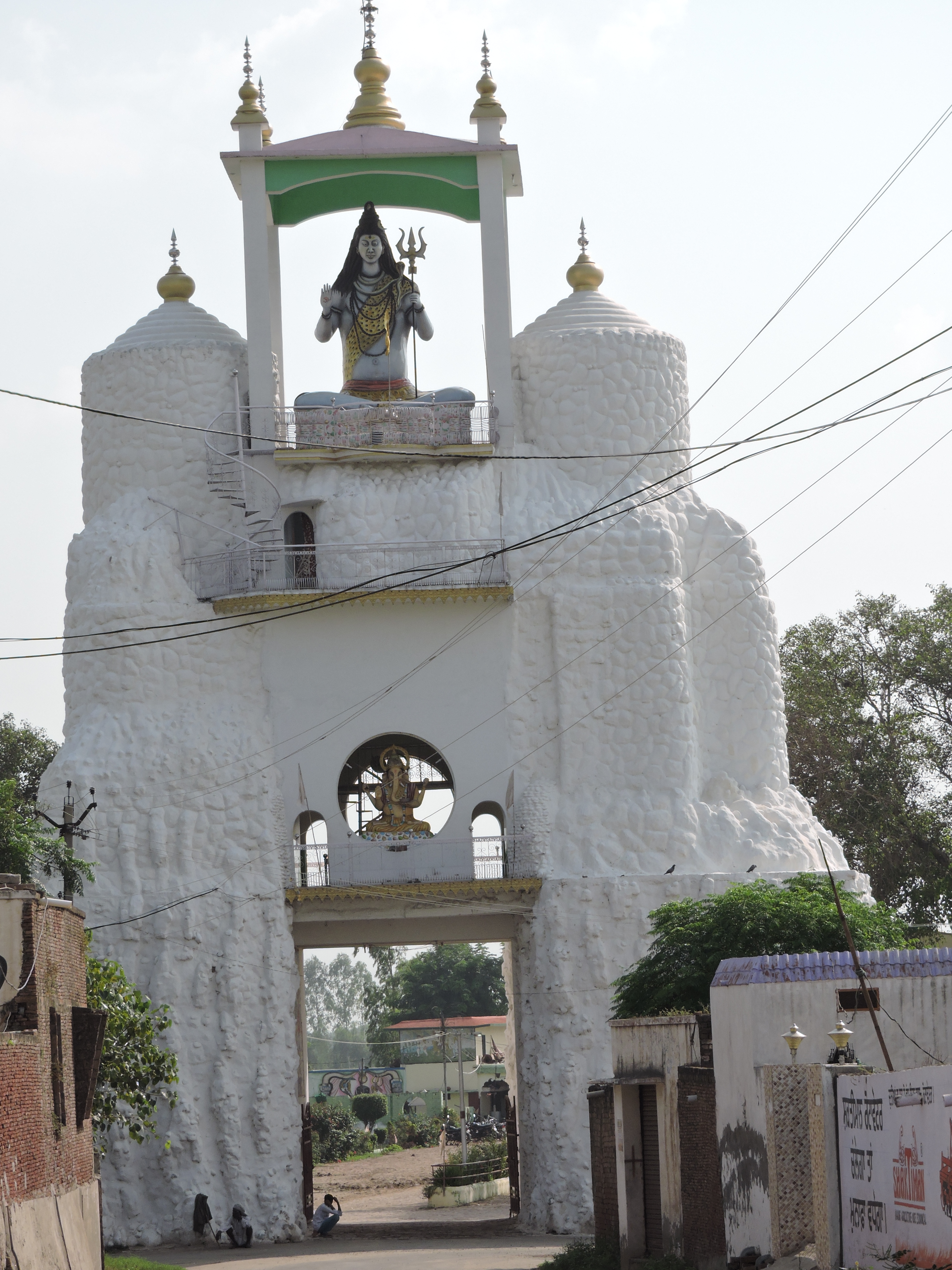
Shiv Mandir, Gharraam, Patiala, Punjab

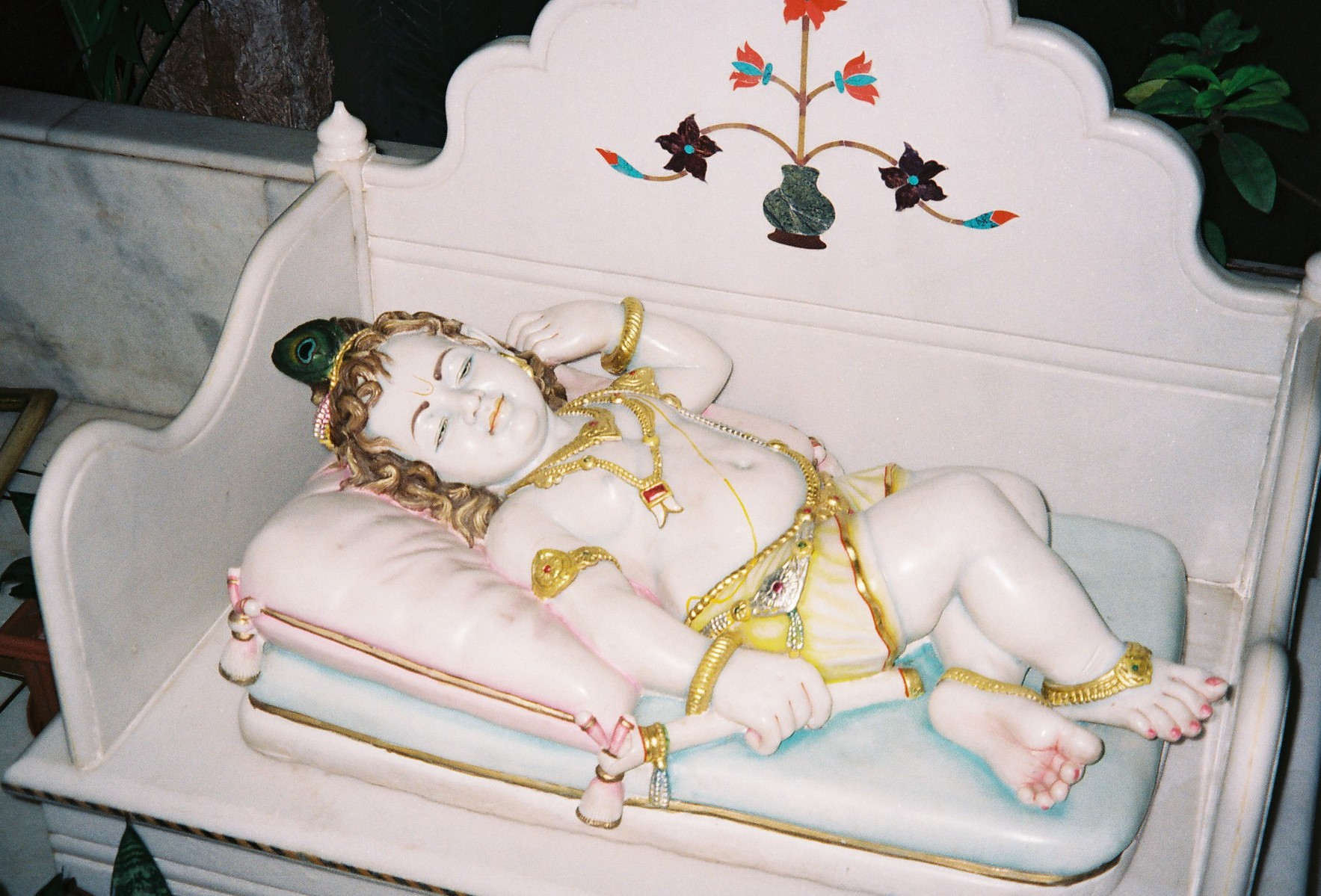
Baby Krishna

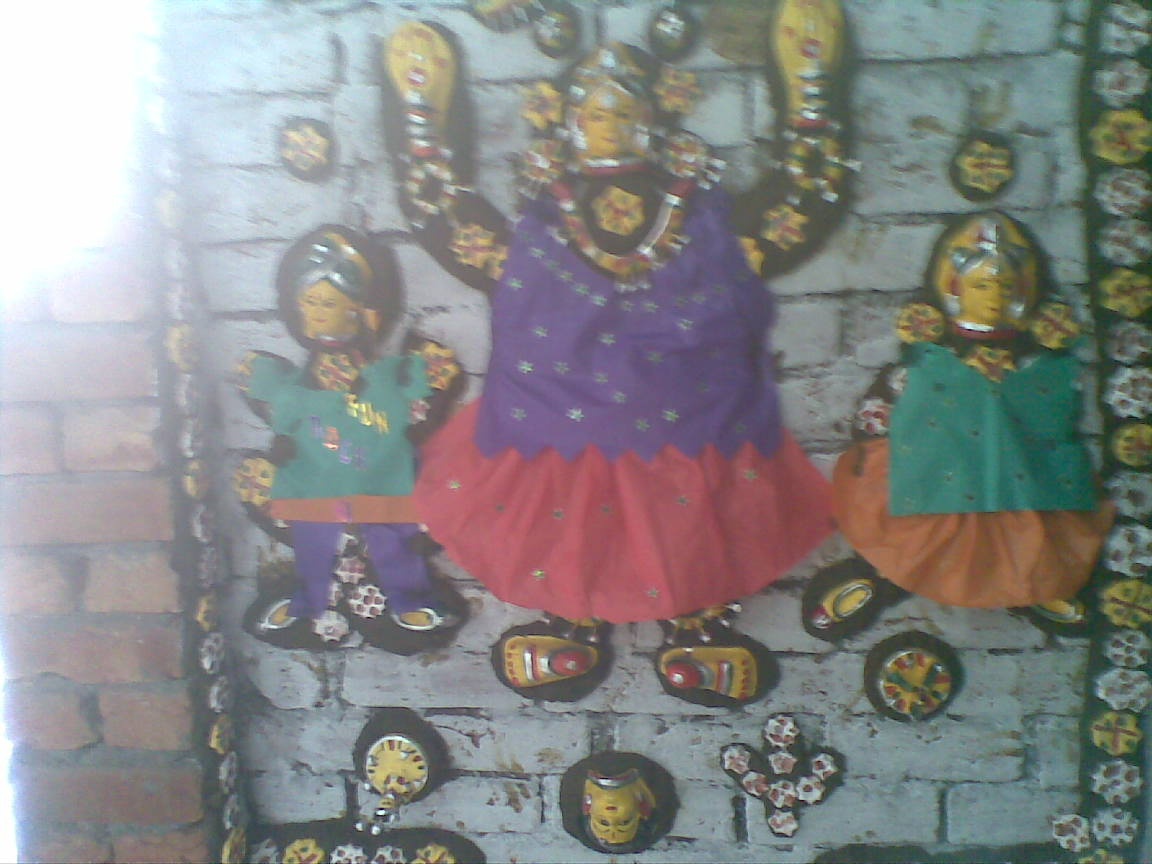
Sanjhi Mata Ji

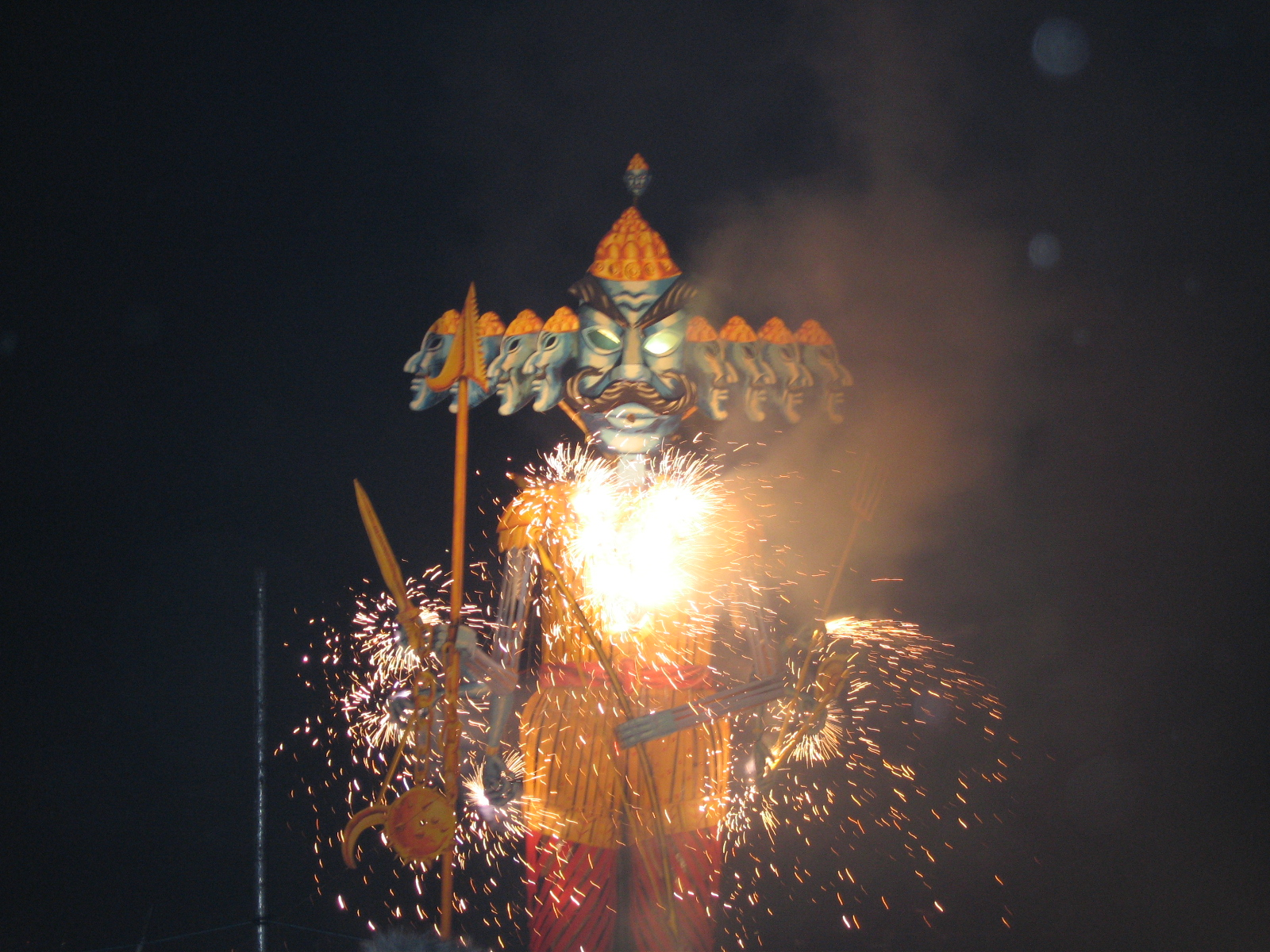
Effigy of Ravana

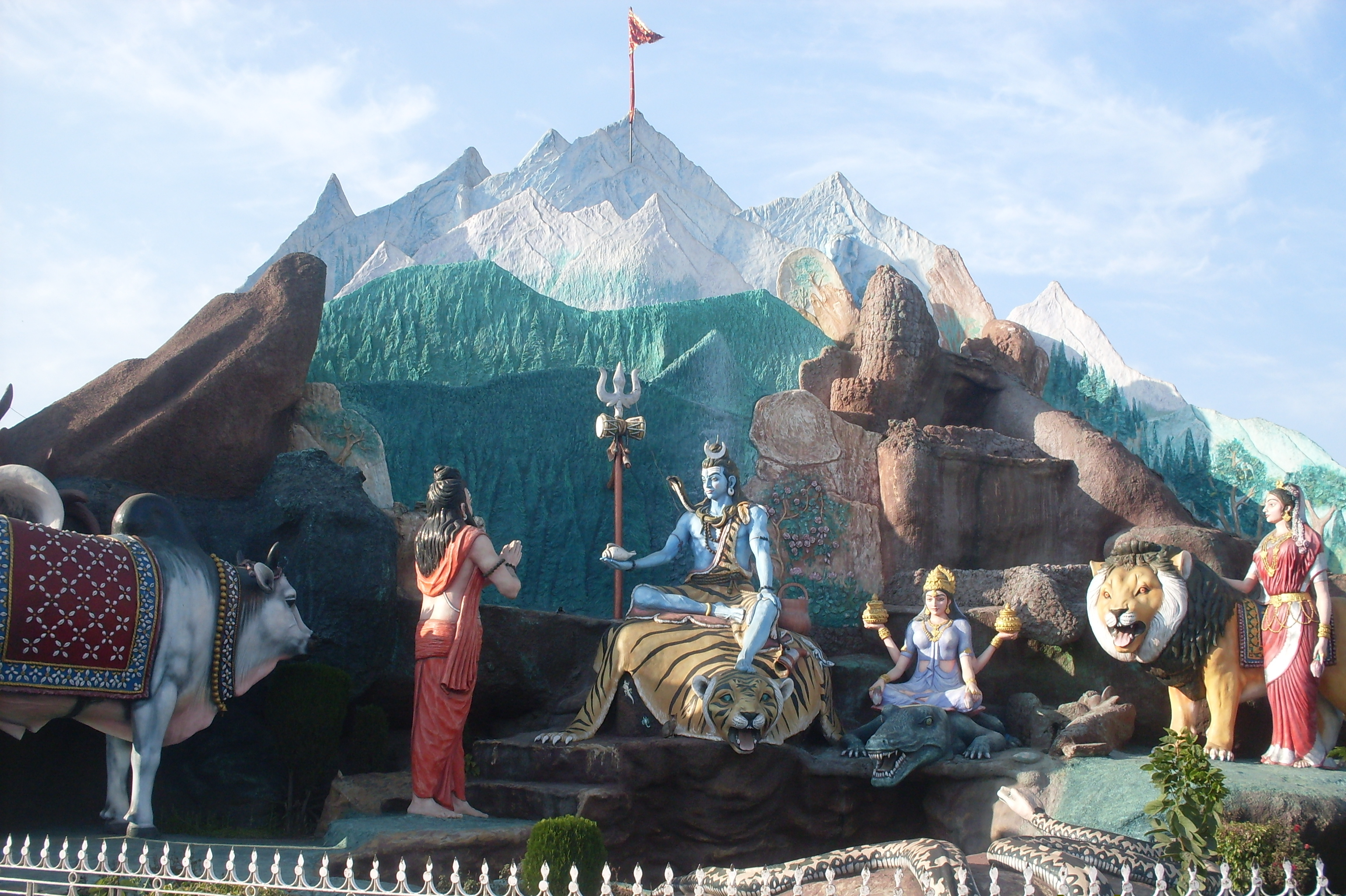
Devi Talaab Mandir Jalandhar City, Punjab

== See also ==
- List of festivals in India
- List of Hindu festivals
- Punjabi calendar
- Punjab
- Hinduism in Punjab
- Punjabi culture
