= Emblem of Punjab, India =

Seal of the State of Punjab

Seal of the State of Punjab
- Armiger: Government of Punjab
- Crest: Wheat stem
- Shield: Lion Capital of Ashoka
- Supporters: Crossed talwar swords
- Motto: सत्यमेव जयते Satyameva Jayate; Truth alone triumphs

The Emblem of Punjab is the official state emblem of the Indian state of Punjab and it is used as the official symbol of the Government of Punjab.

== Design ==
The emblem of Punjab consists of the encircled Lion Capital of Ashoka (depicting ancient Ashoka-era heritage found at Sanghol) with a Wheat stem above it and crossed Swords below it. Around the lion capital is written the legend "Government of Punjab" in the English, Hindi and Punjabi languages.

== Historical emblems ==
During British rule in India, the undivided province of Punjab was granted a coat of arms. These arms consisted of a purple shield charged with a gold sun rising over five rivers in blue and silver. The motto translated at "Let it grow from the rivers" The name "Punjab" means land of five rivers.

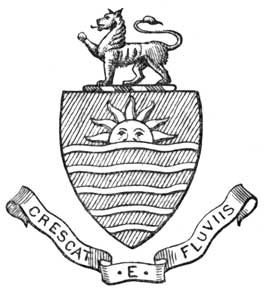
Coat of Arms of Punjab Province (British India)

Badge of Punjab Province (British India)

Emblem of the former Patiala and East Punjab States Union

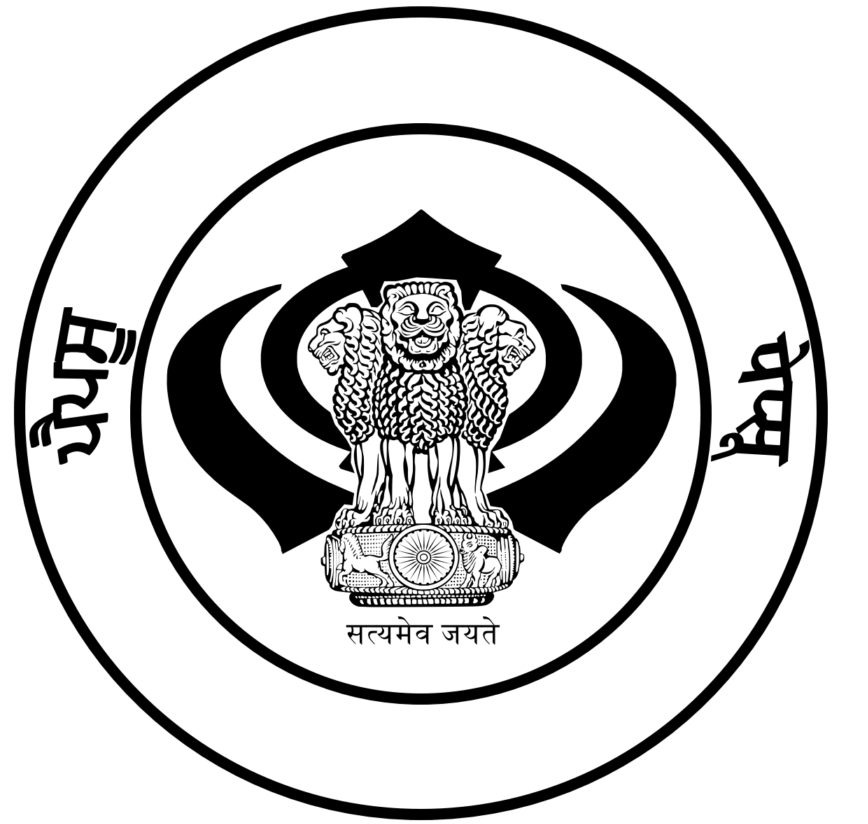
Emblem of the former Patiala and East Punjab States Union

=== Former princely states in Punjab ===
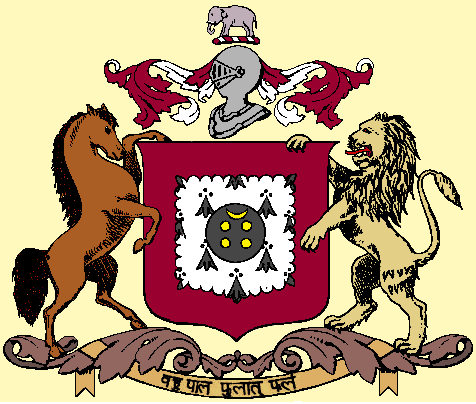
Jind State

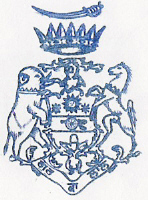
Kapurthala State

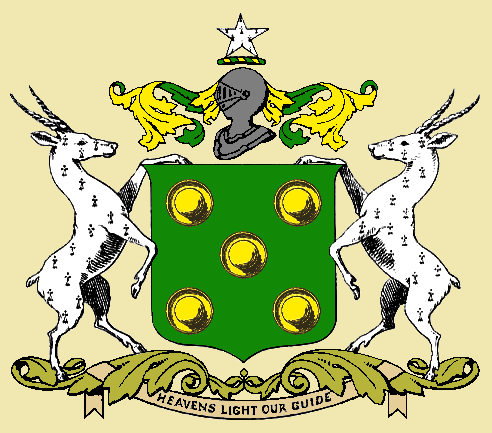
Malerkotla State

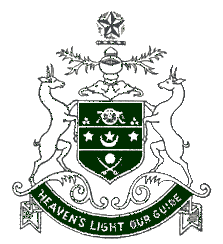
Malerkotla State

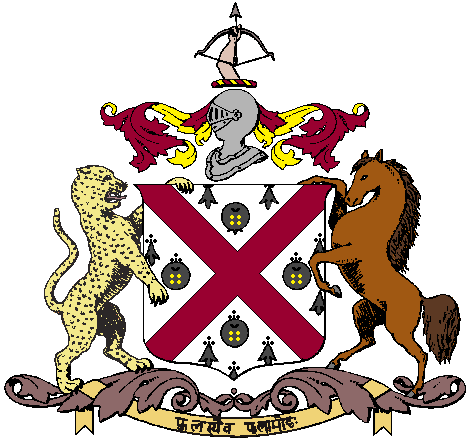
Nabha State

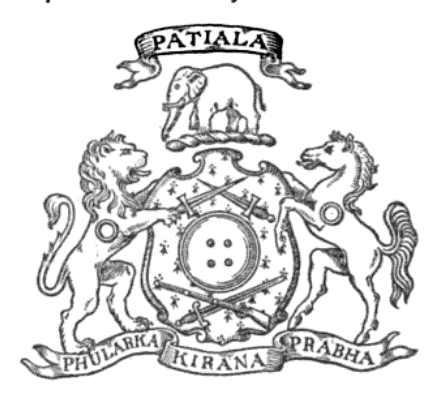
Patiala State

== See also ==
- Nishan Sahib
- Khanda
- National Emblem of India
- List of Indian state emblems
