= Punjabi festivals =

Punjabi festivals are various festive celebrations observed by the Punjabis, originating in the Punjab region. The Punjabis are religiously a diverse and that affects the festivals they observe. According to a 2007 estimate, ~75% percent of the Punjabi population is Muslim, accounting for about 90 million people, with 97% of Punjabis who live in Pakistan following Islam, in contrast to the remaining 30 million Punjabi Sikhs and Hindus who predominantly live in India.

The Punjabi Muslims typically observe the Islamic festivals, do not observe Hindu or Sikh religious festivals, and in Pakistan the official holidays recognize only the Islamic festivals. The Punjabi Sikhs and Hindus typically do not observe these, and instead observe historic festivals such as Lohri, Basant and Vaisakhi as seasonal festivals. The Sikh and Hindu festivals are regional official holidays in India, as are major Islamic festivals. Other seasonal Punjabi festivals in India include Teejon (Teeyan) and Maghi. Teeyan is also known as festival of women, as women enjoy it with their friends. On the day of maghi people fly kites and eat their traditional dish khichdi.

The Punjabi Muslim festivals are set according to the lunar Islamic calendar (Hijri), and the date falls earlier by 10 to 13 days from year to year. The Hindu and Sikh Punjabi seasonal festivals are set on specific dates of the luni-solar Bikrami calendar or Punjabi calendar and the date of the festival also typically varies in the Gregorian calendar but stays within the same two Gregorian months.

Some Punjabi Muslims participate in the traditional, seasonal festivals of the Punjab region: Baisakhi, Basant and to a minor scale Lohri, but this is controversial. Islamic clerics and some politicians have attempted to ban this participation because of the religious basis of the Punjabi festivals, and they being declared haram (forbidden in Islam).

== Buddhist festivals ==
Punjabi Buddhists are a minority in Punjab, India. In the Punjab province of Pakistan, the Buddhist population is negligible.

Punjabi Buddhists celebrate festivals such as Buddha Jayanti.

== Christian festivals ==
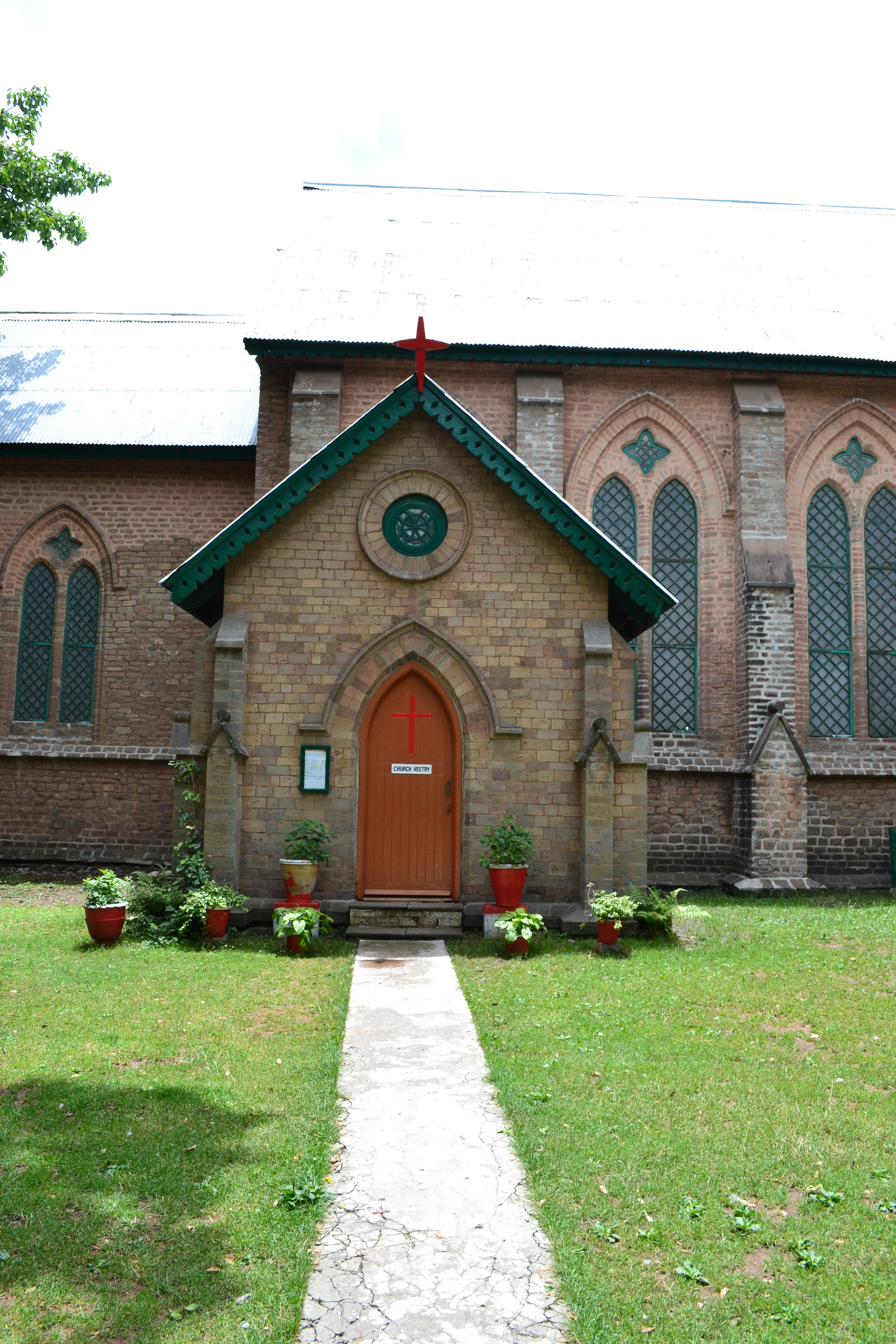
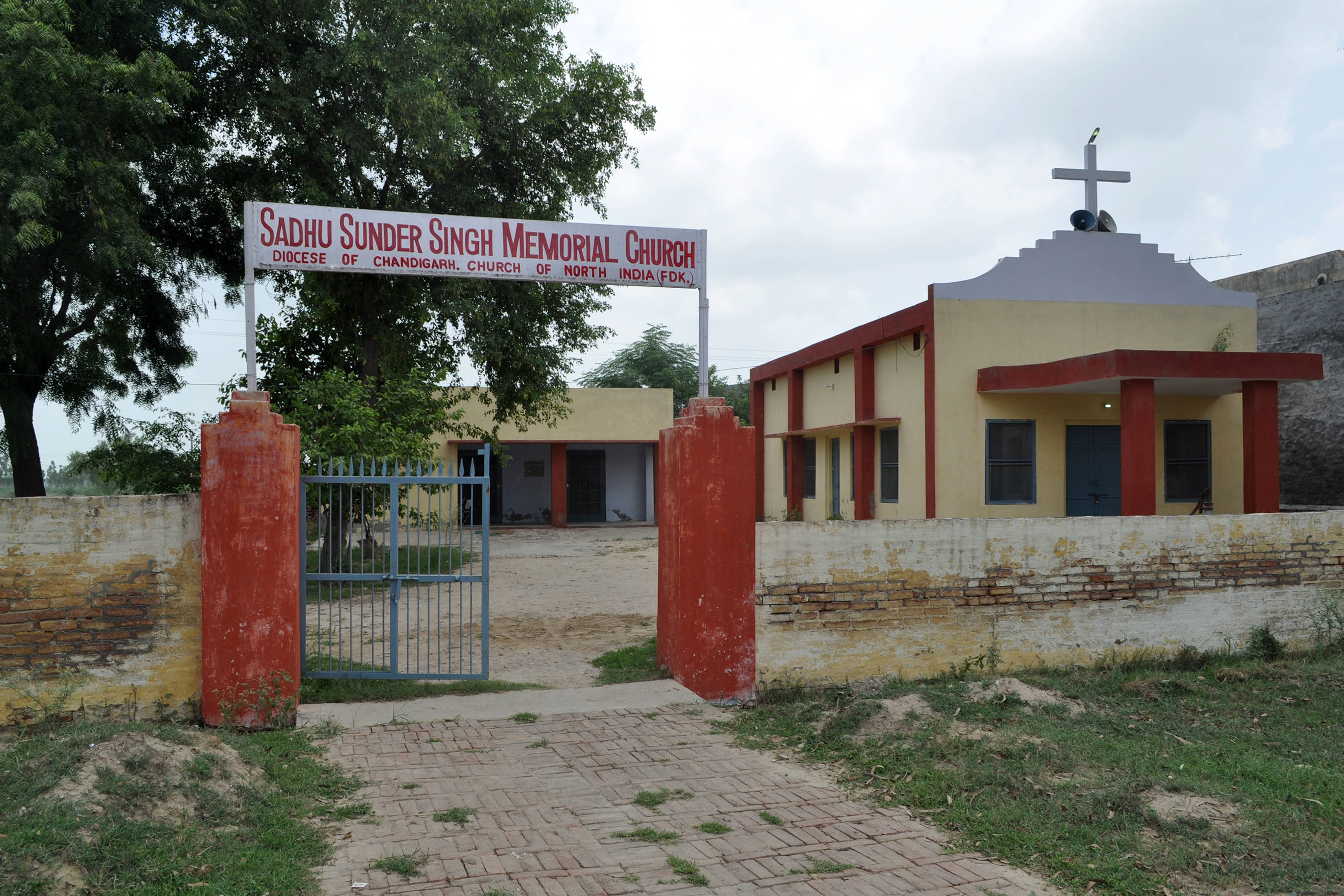
Left: Church in Murree (Pakistan), Right: Chandigarh (India).

Christians are a minority in Pakistan, constituting about 2.3% of its population in contrast to 97.2% Muslims. In Indian state of Punjab, Christians form about 1.1% of its total population, while the predominant majority of the population being Sikh and Hindus. Punjabi Christians celebrate Christmas to mark the birth of Jesus. In Punjab, Pakistan, people stay up late singing Punjabi Christmas carol services. People attend churches in places such as Gurdaspur, Amritsar, Jalandhar and Hoshiarpur districts in Punjab, India that have a higher Christian population, to be part of Christmas celebrations. Christians also celebrate Easter by engaging in processions.

== Hindu festivals ==
Punjabi Hindus celebrate a number of religious festivals.

=== Bavan Dvadasi ===
Bavan Dvadasi is a festival dedicated to the Hindu God Vamana. The festival is held during the lunar month of Bhadra. Singh writing for the Tribune in 2000 states that "Tipri, a local version of dandia of Gujarat and a characteristic of the Patiala and Ambala districts, is losing popularity. Its performances are now limited to the occasions of Bavan Dvadsi." According to Singh (2000) "Bavan Dvadsi is a local festival celebrated only in the Patiala and Ambala districts. Anywhere else, people are not aware of it. Now, tipri is performed during this festival only." Singh then states that Bavan Dvadsi "is to celebrate the victory of Lord Vishnu, who in the form of a dwarf, had tricked Raja Bali to grant him three wishes, before transforming into a giant to take the Earth, the sky and Bali's life". Tipri competitions are held during the festival. Dancers dance in pairs, striking the sticks and creating a rhythm whilst holding ropes.

=== Raksha Bandhan ===
Raksha Bandhan, also Rakshabandhan, or Rakhi, is a popular, traditionally Hindu, annual rite, or ceremony, which is central to a festival of the same name, celebrated in India, Nepal and other parts of the Indian subcontinent, and among people around the world influenced by Hindu culture. On this day, sisters of all ages tie a talisman, or amulet, called the rakhi, around the wrists of their brothers, symbolically protecting them, receiving a gift in return, and traditionally investing the brothers with a share of the responsibility of their potential care.

Raksha Bandhan is observed on the last day of the Hindu lunar calendar month of Shraavana, which typically falls in August. The expression "Raksha Bandhan", Sanskrit, literally, "the bond of protection, obligation, or care", is now principally applied to this ritual. Until the mid-20th-century, the expression was more commonly applied to a similar ritual, also held on the same day, with precedence in ancient Hindu texts, in which a domestic priest ties amulets, charms, or threads on the wrists of his patrons, or changes their sacred thread, and receives gifts of money; in some places, this is still the case. In contrast, the sister-brother festival, with origins in folk culture, had names which varied with location, with some rendered as Saluno, Silono and Rakri. A ritual associated with included the sisters placing shoots of barley behind the ears of their brothers.

Of special significance to married women, Raksha Bandhan is rooted in the practice of territorial or village exogamy, in which a bride marries out of her natal village or town, and her parents, by custom, do not visit her in her married home. In rural north India, where village exogamy is strongly prevalent, large numbers of married Hindu women travel back to their parents' homes every year for the ceremony. Their brothers, who typically live with the parents or nearby, sometimes travel to their sisters' married home to escort them back. Many younger married women arrive a few weeks earlier at their natal homes and stay until the ceremony. The brothers serve as lifelong intermediaries between their sisters' married and parental homes, as well as potential stewards of their security.

In urban India, where families are increasingly nuclear, the festival has become more symbolic, but continues to be highly popular. The rituals associated with this festival have spread beyond their traditional regions and have been transformed through technology and migration, the movies, social interaction, and promotion by Hinduism, as well as by the nation state.

Among women and men who are not blood relatives, there is also a transformed tradition of voluntary kin relations, achieved through the tying of rakhi amulets, which have cut across caste and class lines, and Hindu and Muslim divisions. In some communities or contexts, other figures, such as a matriarch, or a person in authority, can be included in the ceremony in ritual acknowledgement of their benefaction.

=== Krishna Janmashtami ===
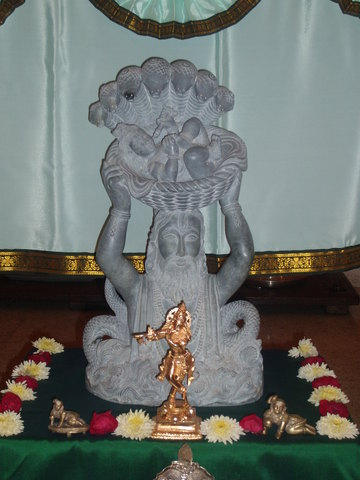
Baby Krishna being carried by Vasudeva

Krishna Janmashtami, also known simply as Janmashtami or Gokulashtami, is an annual Hindu festival that celebrates the birth of Krishna, the eighth avatar of Vishnu. It is observed according to the Hindu lunisolar calendar, on the eighth day (Ashtami) of the Krishna Paksha (dark fortnight) in Shraavana or Bhadrapad (depending on whether the calendar chooses the new moon or full moon day as the last day of the month), which overlaps with August or September of the Gregorian calendar.

It is an important festival, particularly in the Vaishnavism tradition of Hinduism. Dance-drama enactments of the life of Krishna according to the Bhagavata Purana (such as Rasa Lila or Krishna Lila), devotional singing through the midnight when Krishna was born, fasting (upavasa), a night vigil (Ratri Jagaran), and a festival (Mahotsav) on the following day are a part of the Janmashtami celebrations. It is celebrated particularly in Mathura and Vrindavan, along with major Vaishnava and non-sectarian communities found in Manipur, Assam, Bihar, West Bengal, Odisha, Madhya Pradesh, Rajasthan, Gujarat, Maharashtra, Karnataka, Kerala, Tamil Nadu, Andhra Pradesh and all other states of India.

Krishna Janmashtami is followed by the festival Nandotsav, which celebrates the occasion when Nanda Baba distributed gifts to the community in honor of the birth.

=== Mahashivratri ===
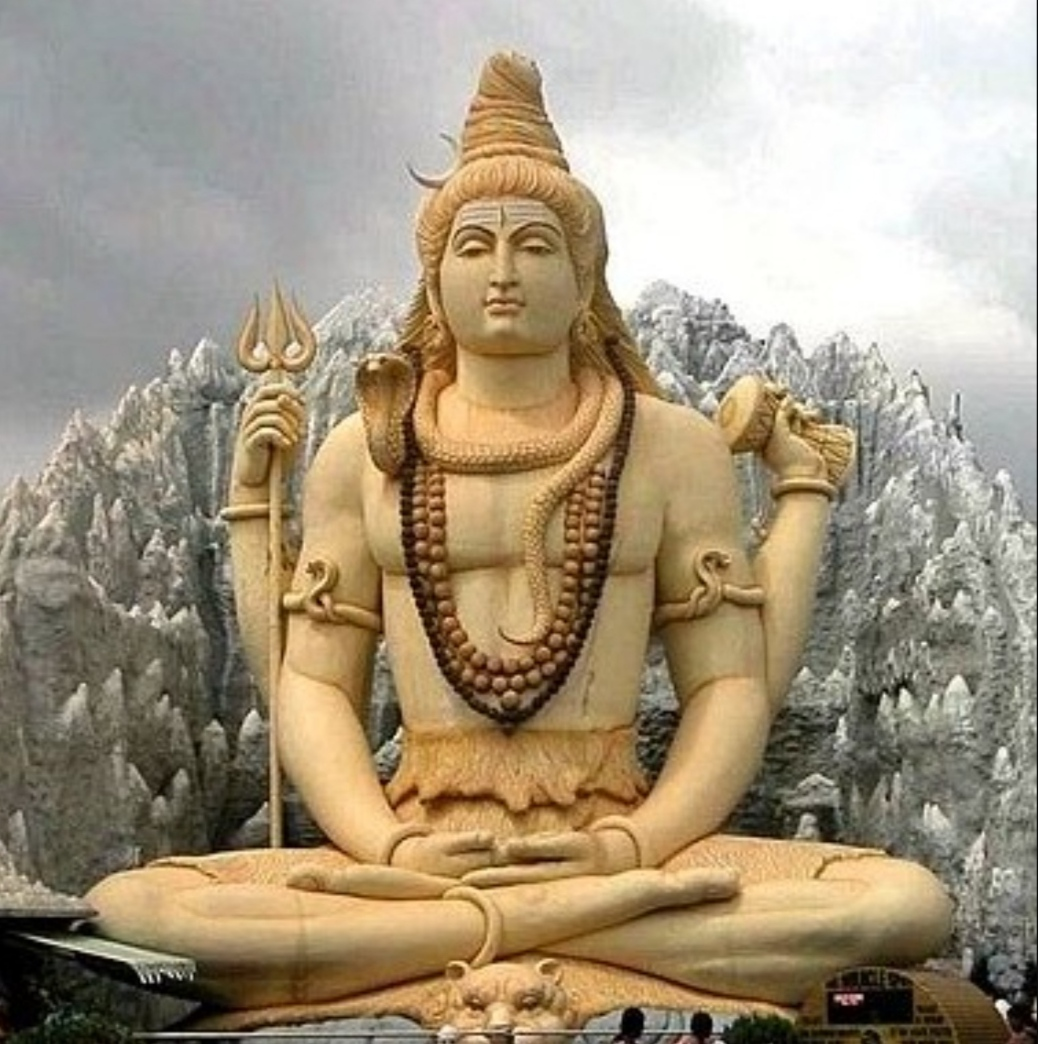
Murudeshwar Shiva

Maha Shivaratri is the great night of Shiva, during which followers of Shiva observe religious fasting and the offering of Bael (Bilva) leaves to Shiva. Mahashivaratri Festival or 'The Night of Shiva' is celebrated with devotion and religious fervor in honor of Lord Shiva, one of the deities of Hindu Trinity. Shivaratri falls on the moonless 14th night of the new moon in Phalgun (February – March). Celebrating the festival of Shivaratri devotees observe day and night fast and perform ritual worship of Shiva Lingam to appease Lord Shiva. To mark the Shivratri festival, devotees wake up early and take a ritual bath, preferably in river Ganga. After wearing fresh new clothes devotees visit the nearest Shiva temple to give ritual bath to the Shiva Lingum with milk, honey, water etc. On Shivaratri, worship of Lord Shiva continues all through the day and night. Every three hours priests perform ritual pooja of Shivalingam by bathing it with milk, yoghurt, honey, ghee, sugar and water amidst the chanting of "Om Namah Shivaya' and ringing of temple bells. Jaagran (Nightlong vigil) is also observed in Shiva temples where large number of devotees spend the night singing hymns and devotional songs in praise of Lord Shiva. It is only on the following morning that devotee break their fast by partaking prasad offered to the deity.

=== Holi ===
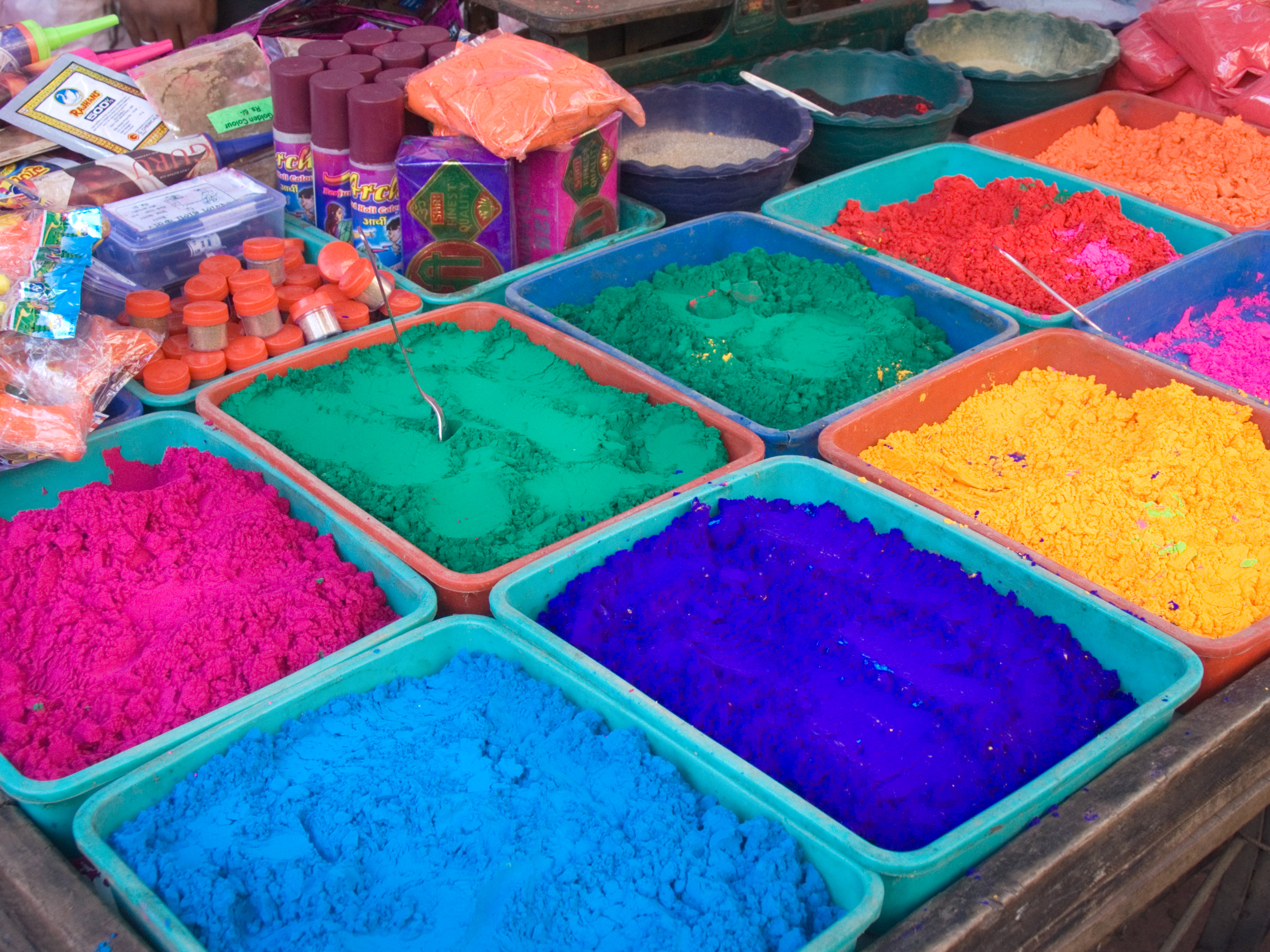
India - Colour Powder stalls on Holi- 7242

Holi is the spring Hindu festival of colours which is celebrated by throwing colours on each other. The festival is celebrated on the full moon day of Phalguna Month of Hindu Calendar. The festival is primarily celebrated by Hindus and Sikhs.

In the Indian state of Punjab, Holi is preceded by Holika Dahan the night before. On the day of Holi, people engage in throwing colours on each other.

During Holi in Punjab, walls and courtyards of rural houses are enhanced with drawings and paintings similar to rangoli in South India, mandana in Rajasthan, and rural arts in other parts of India. This art is known as chowk-poorana or chowkpurana in Punjab and is given shape by the peasant women of the state. In courtyards, this art is drawn using a piece of cloth. The art includes drawing tree motifs, flowers, ferns, creepers, plants, peacocks, palanquins, geometric patterns along with vertical, horizontal and oblique lines. These arts add to the festive atmosphere.

=== Sanjhi ===
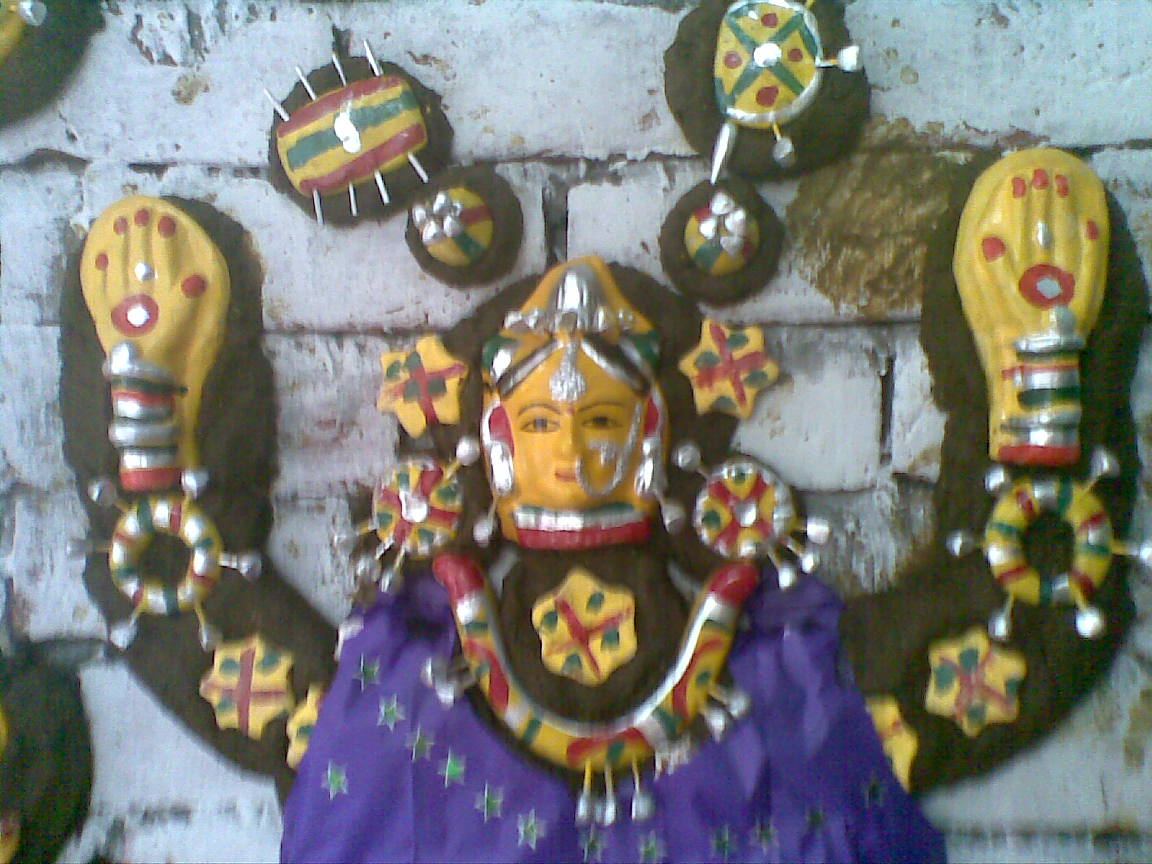
Sanjhi mata

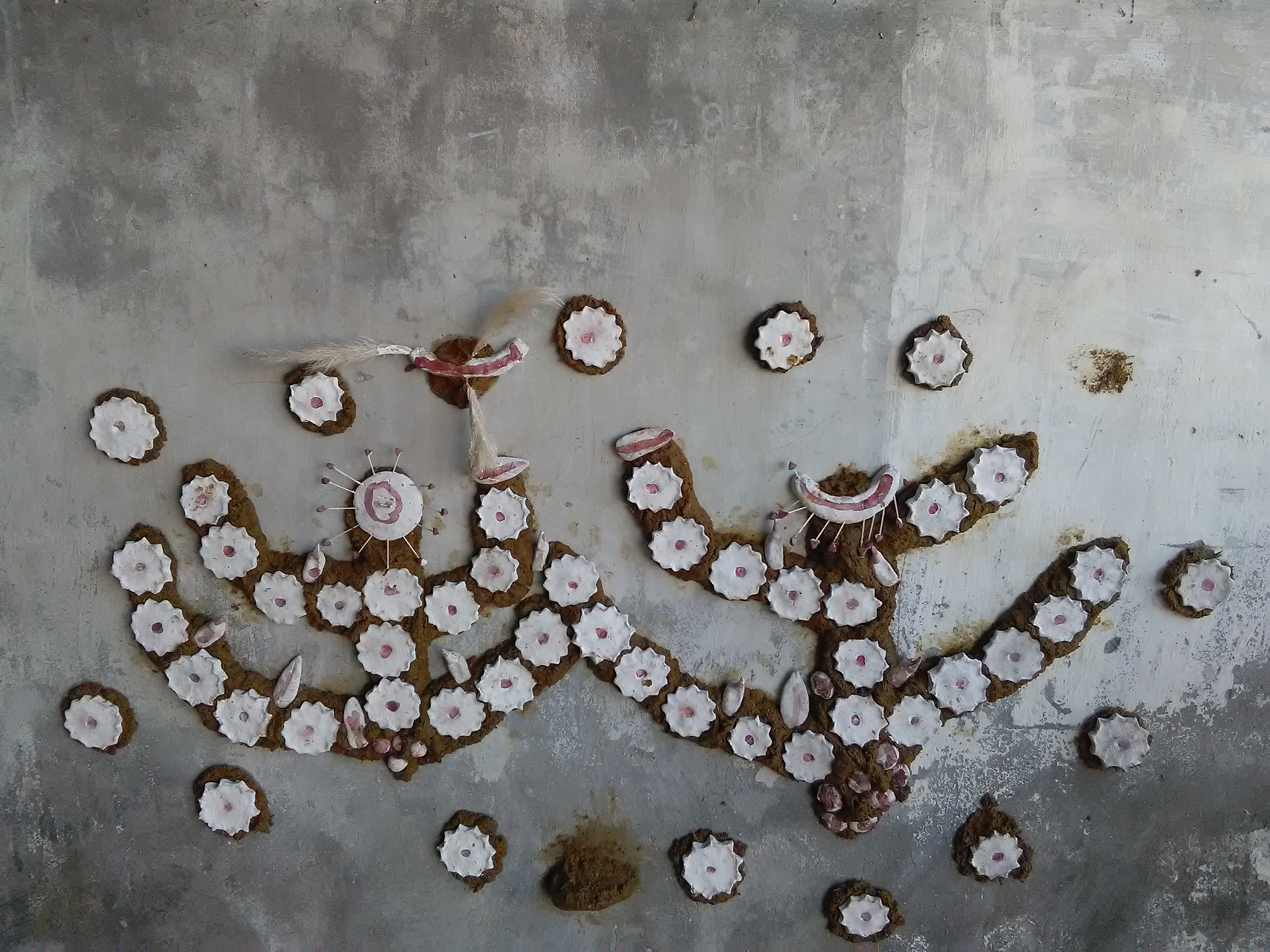
Contemporary Sanjhi image in Punjab

Sanjhi is celebrated mainly by women and girls in parts of Delhi, Punjab, Haryana, and Uttar Pradesh. Sanjhi is the name of a mother goddess, after whom images are made of mud and molded into various shapes such as cosmic bodies or the face of the goddess, and they get different colors. The local potters make images of various body parts like her arms, legs, face decked with ornaments and weapons. These additions make the image look beautiful and gracious. The additions to the image this way depend upon the economic means of the family.

The image is designed on the first day of the nine days of Durga Puja or Navratri. Every day women from the neighborhood are invited for singing bhajans and performing aarti. The young girls also gather there and offer their adoration to the mother who is believed to get them suitable husbands. The aarti or the bhajans are chanted daily and some elderly woman guides others. It is usually an all females event. Sanjhi image is prepared on the wall by those families who seek fulfillment of their wishes termed mannat by Punjabis. Some people also seek her blessings for the marriage of their daughters. Kirtan is performed and the image is immersed in water on the last day. The Sanjhi festival ends with the immersion of Sanjhi on the day of Dussehra. The girls offer prayers and food to the goddess every day.

=== Maghi ===
Maghi is the regional name of Makar Sankranti or Magh Sankranti and marks beginning of Magha month of Hindu Calendar. While Hindus gather near Mandirs. The Magha Mela, according to Diana L. Eck – a professor at Harvard University specializing in Indology, is mentioned in the Hindu epic, the Mahabharata, thus placing this festival to be around 2,000 years old. Many go to sacred rivers or lakes and bathe with thanksgiving to the sun. Maghi happens to be the day when Bhishma, the octogenarian leader of Kauravas emacipated his soul from bondage of body, by conscious act of will after discoursing many days on mysteries of life and death.

=== Vaisakhi ===
Vaisakhi, also pronounced as Baisakhi marks the beginning of Hindu solar New year. Vaisakhi marks the first day of the month of Vaisakha and is usually celebrated on 13 or 14 April every year. This holiday also is known as Vaisakha Sankranti and celebrates the solar new year, based on the Hindu Vikram Samvat calendar.

Vaisakhi is a historical and religious festival in Hinduism. It is usually celebrated on 13 or 14 April every year. For Hindus, the festival is their traditional solar new year, a harvest festival, an occasion to bath in sacred rivers such as Ganges, Jhelum, and Kaveri, visit temples, meet friends and take part in other festivities. In other parts of India, the Vaisakhi festival is known by various regional names.

In Undivided Punjab, the Hindu Shrine of Katas Raj was known for its Vaisakhi fair. It was attended by around 10,000 pilgrims who were mostly Hindus. Similarly, at the shrine of Bairagi Baba Ram Thaman, a Vaisakhi fair was held annually since 16th century CE which was attended by around 60,000 pilgrims and Bairagi saints from all over India used to throng the shrine.

The Vaisakhi fair is at Thakurdwara Bhagwan Narainji at Pandori Mahatan village in Gurdaspur district of Punjab where the fair lasts for three days from 1st Vaisakha to 3rd Vaisakha. The celebrations start in form of procession on morning of 1st Vaisakha, carrying Mahant in a palanquin by Brahmacharis and devotees. After that Navgraha Puja is held and charities in money, grains and cows are done. At evening, Sankirtan is held in which Mahant delivers religious discourses and concludes it by distributing prasad of Patashas (candy drops). Pilgrims also take ritual bathings at sacred tank in the shrine.

=== Ram Navami ===
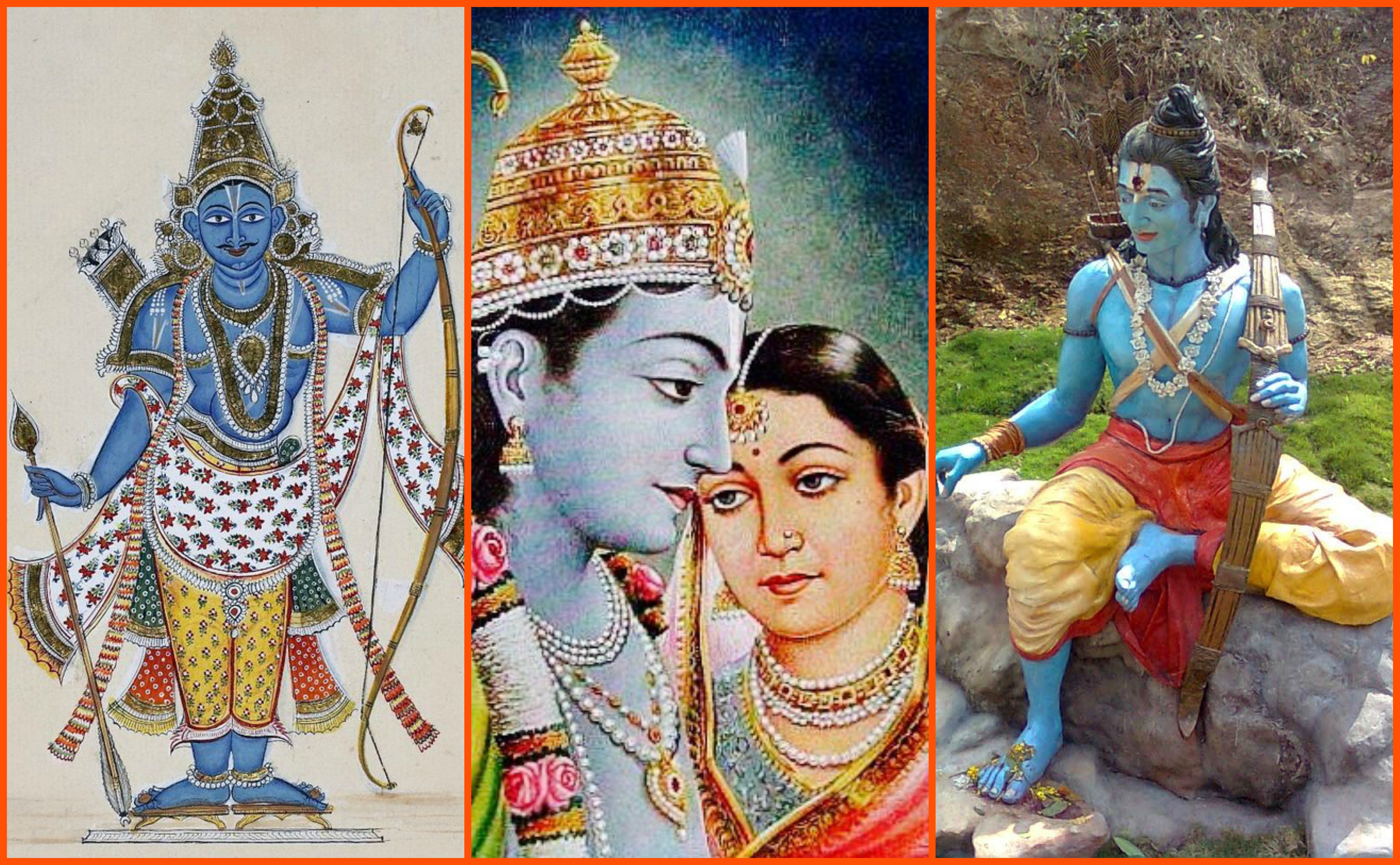
An image collage of Hindu deity Rama

Rama Navami is the celebration of the birth of Rama. Rama Navami is the day on which Lord Rama, the seventh incarnation of Lord Vishnu, incarnated in human form in Ayodhya. He is the ardha ansh of Vishnu or has half the divinitive qualities of Lord Vishnu. The word "Rama" literally means one who is divinely blissful and who gives joy to others, and one in whom the sages rejoice. Ram Navami falls on the ninth day of the bright fortnight in Chaitra (April/May) and coincides with Vasant Navratri or Chait Durga Puja. Therefore, in some regions, the festival is spread over nine days. This day, marking the birthday of Lord Rama, is also observed as the marriage day of Rama and Sita and thus also referred to as Kalyanotsavam. In Ayodhya, the birthplace of Lord Rama, a huge fair is held with thousands of devotees gathering to celebrate this festival. The fair continues for two days, and rathyatras, carrying the Deities of Ram, his brother Laxman, His wife Sita, and His greatest devotee Mahavir Hanuman, are taken out from almost all Ram Temples. Hanuman is known for is his devotion to Rama, and his tales form an important part of the celebration. In Andhra Pradesh, Ram Navami is celebrated for 10 days from the Chaitra saptami to the Bahula Padyami in March/April. Temples re-enact the marriage of Lord Rama and Sita to commemorate this event, since this day is also the day they got married.

=== Dussehra ===
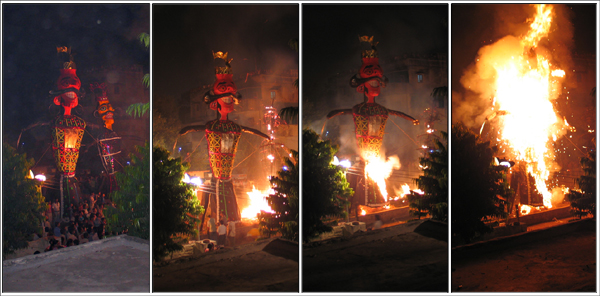
Dasara is observed with the burning of Ravana effigies.

In most of northern and western India, Dasha-Hara (literally, "ten days") is celebrated in honour of Rama. Thousands of drama-dance-music plays based on the Ramayan and Ramcharitmanas (Ramlila) are performed at outdoor fairs across the land and in temporarily built staging grounds featuring effigies of the demons Ravan, Kumbhakarna and Meghanada. The effigies are burnt on bonfires in the evening of Vijayadashami-Dussehra. While Dussehra is observed on the same day across India, the festivities leading to it vary. In many places, the "Rama Lila" or the brief version of the story of Rama, Sita and Lakshaman, is enacted over the 9 days before it, but in some cities, such as Varanasi, the entire story is freely acted out by performance-artists before the public every evening for a month.

The performance arts tradition during the Dussehra festival was inscribed by UNESCO as one of the "Intangible Cultural Heritage of Humanity" in 2008. The festivities, states UNESCO, include songs, narration, recital and dialogue based on the Hindu text Ramacharitmanas by Tulsidas. It is celebrated across northern India for Dussehra, but particularly in historically important Hindu cities of Ayodhya, Varanasi, Vrindavan, Almora, Satna and Madhubani. The festival and dramatic enactment of the virtues versus vices filled story is organised by communities in hundreds of small villages and towns, attracting a mix of audiences from different social, gender and economic backgrounds. In many parts of India, the audience and villagers join in and participate spontaneously, helping the artists, others helping with stage setup, make-up, effigies, and lights. These arts come to a close on the night of Dussehra, when the victory of Rama is celebrated by burning the effigies of evil Ravan and his colleagues.

=== Diwali ===
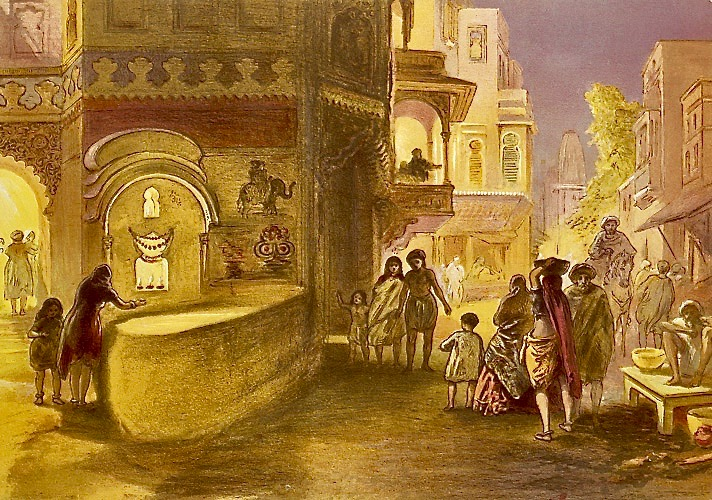
William Simpson labelled his chromolithograph of 1867 CE as "Dewali, feast of lamps". It showed streets lit up at dusk, with a girl and her mother lighting a street corner lamp.

Diwali festival usually lasts five days and is celebrated during the Hindu lunisolar month Kartika (between mid-October and mid-November). One of the most popular festivals of Hinduism, Diwali symbolizes the spiritual "victory of light over darkness, good over evil, and knowledge over ignorance". The festival is widely associated with Lakshmi, goddess of prosperity, with many other regional traditions connecting the holiday to Sita and Rama, Vishnu, Krishna, Yama, Yami, Durga, Kali, Hanuman, Ganesha, Kubera, Dhanvantari, or Vishvakarman. Furthermore, it is, in some regions, a celebration of the day Lord Rama returned to his kingdom Ayodhya with his wife Sita and his brother Lakshmana after defeating Ravana in Lanka and serving 14 years of exile.

In the lead-up to Diwali, celebrants will prepare by cleaning, renovating, and decorating their homes and workplaces with diyas (oil lamps) and rangolis. During Diwali, people wear their finest clothes, illuminate the interior and exterior of their homes with diyas and rangoli, perform worship ceremonies of Lakshmi, the goddess of prosperity and wealth, (Note: Hindus of eastern and northeastern states of India associate the festival with the goddess Durga, or her fierce avatar Kali (Shaktism). According to McDermott, this region also celebrated the Lakshmi puja historically, while the Kali puja tradition started in the colonial era and was particular prominent post-1920s.) light fireworks, and partake in family feasts, where mithai (sweets) and gifts are shared. Diwali is also a major cultural event for the Hindu and Jain diaspora from the Indian subcontinent.

The five-day long festival originated in the Indian subcontinent and is mentioned in early Sanskrit texts. Diwali is usually celebrated twenty days after the Dashera (Dasara, Dasain) festival, with Dhanteras, or the regional equivalent, marking the first day of the festival when celebrants prepare by cleaning their homes and making decorations on the floor, such as rangolis. The second day is Naraka Chaturdashi. The third day is the day of Lakshmi Puja and the darkest night of the traditional month. In some parts of India, the day after Lakshmi Puja is marked with the Govardhan Puja and Balipratipada (Padwa). Some Hindu communities mark the last day as Bhai Dooj or the regional equivalent, which is dedicated to the bond between sister and brother, while other Hindu and Sikh craftsmen communities mark this day as Vishwakarma Puja and observe it by performing maintenance in their work spaces and offering prayers.

=== Fasts ===
==== Karwa chauth ====
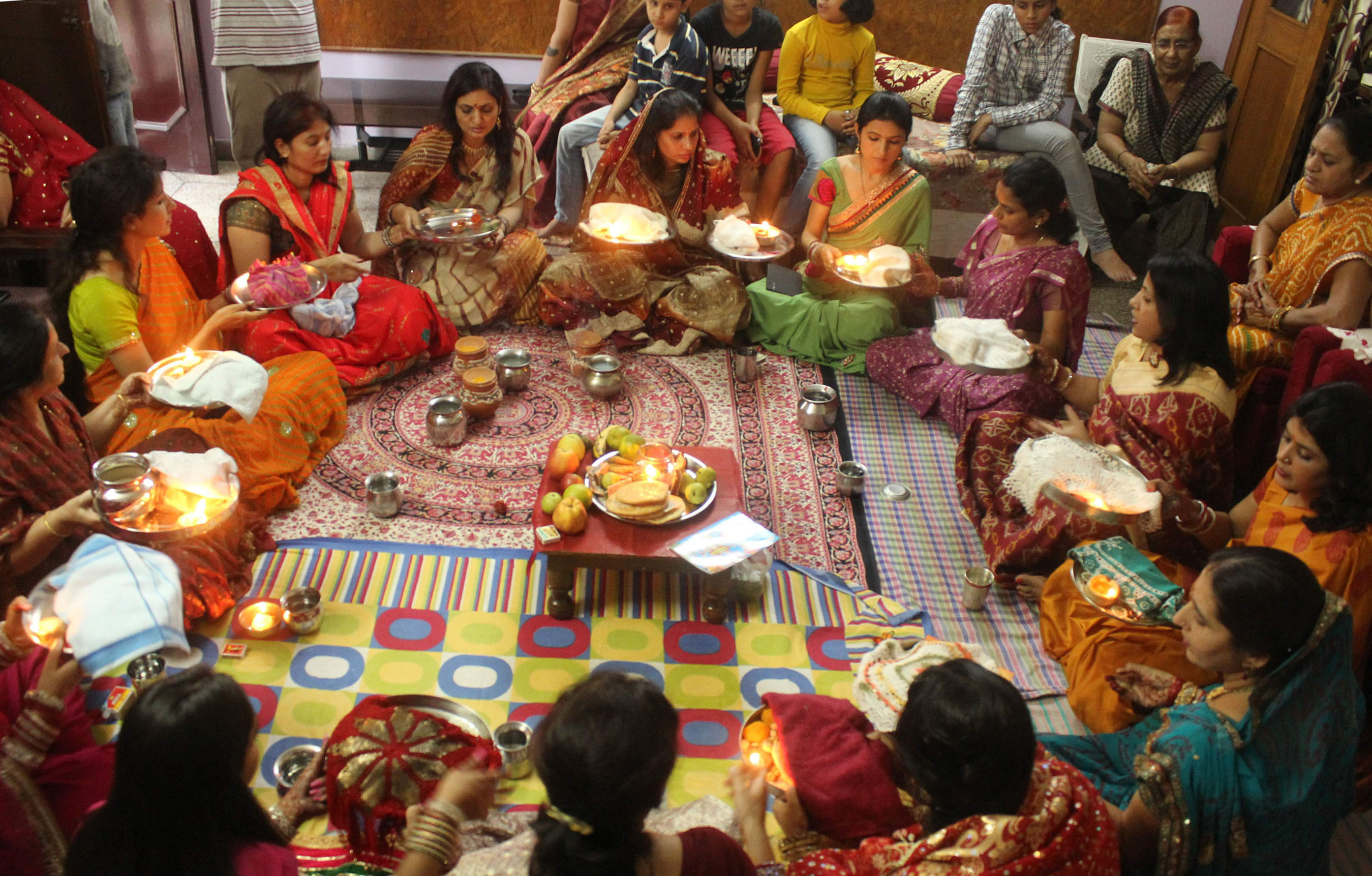
The fasting women collectively sitting in a circle, while doing Karwa Chauth puja, singing song while performing the feris (passing their thalis around in the circle)

Karu-ay is the Punjabi name for the fast of Karva Chauth. This fast is primarily traditionally observed in the Punjab region but is also observed in parts of Uttar Pradesh and Rajasthan.

Although the mode of performing the Karva Chauth fast requires the woman to see the Moon through a sieve and then her husband's face through the same sieve before she eats, in the Punjabi Karu-ay da varat, traditionally a brother will collect his married sister who will keep the fast at her natal home.

The women will eat sweet dishes before sunrise and will not eat throughout the day. Women also get dressed up in traditional attire and gather in the evening for hearing tales about the fast. The purpose of the fast is for the well-being and longevity of husbands.

==== Jhakrya ====
Jhakrya is a Punjabi fast which according to Kehal is observed by mothers for their sons' well-being. However, Pritam (1996) believes the fast is kept by mothers for the welfare of their children.

Jharkri is a clay pot in which dry sweet dishes are kept. Mothers are required to eat something sweet in the morning and then fast all day. Jhakrya fast is observed four days after Karva Chauth and is related to Hoi Mata. A mother who keeps Jhakrya da varat for the first time will distribute the sweets kept in the Jhakri to her husband's clan. She will also give her mother-in-law a Punjabi suit.

On subsequent fasts, mothers will fill the Jhakri will water and jaggery and rice. When the moon rises, an offering is made to the stars and then the sons. Other food will also be given to the sons. Thereafter, mothers will eat something sweet to break the fast.

==== Ahoi Ashtami ====
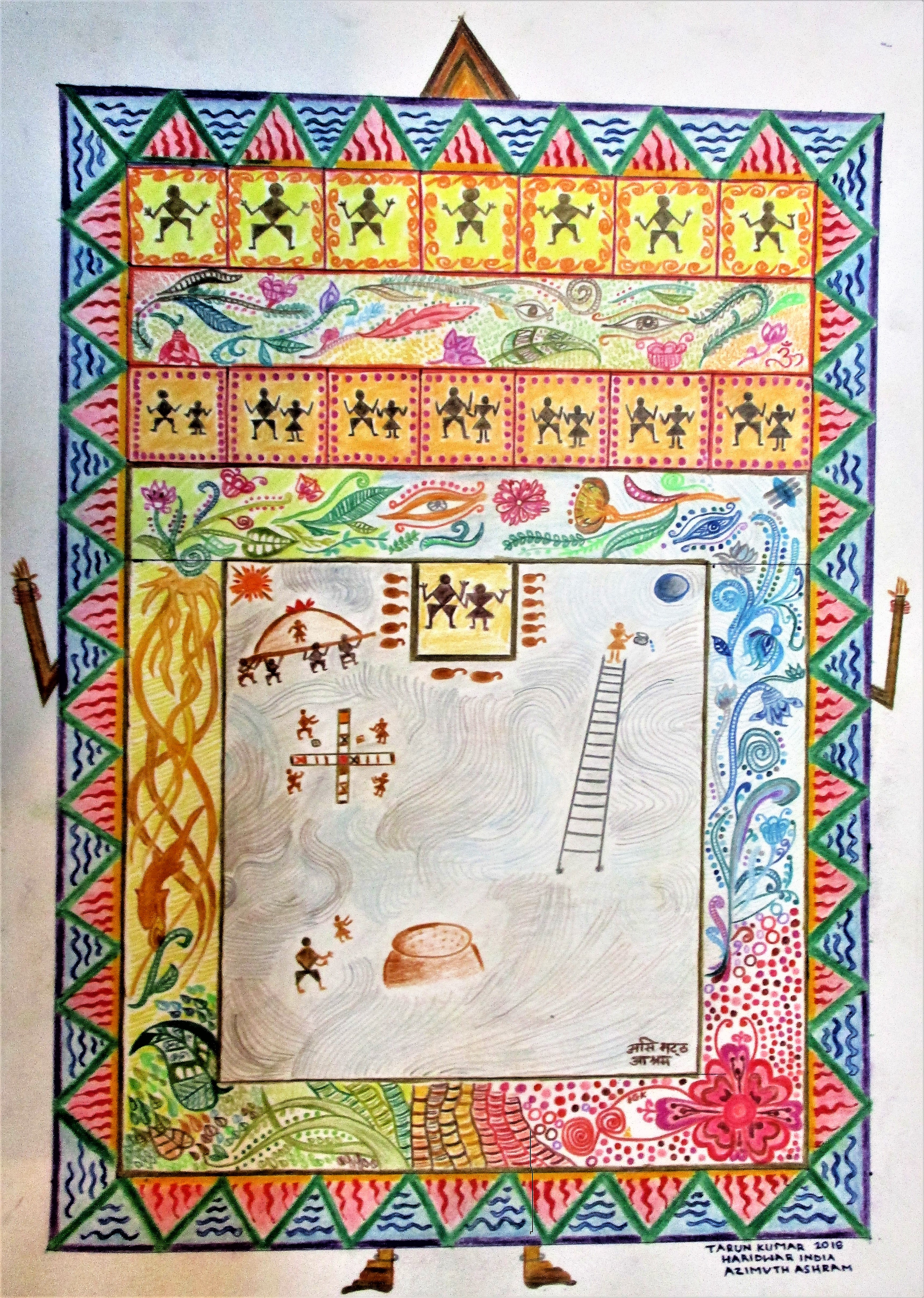
Ahoy! Glory to Ahoi Mata

Ahoi Ashtami is a Hindu festival celebrated about 8 days before Diwali on Krishna Paksha Ashtami. According to Purnimant calendar followed in North India, it falls during the month of Kartik and according to Amanta calendar followed in Gujarat, Maharashtra and other southern states, it falls during the month of Ashvin. However, it is just the name of the month which differs and the fasting of Ahoi Ashtami is done on the same day.

The fasting and puja on Ahoi Ashtami are dedicated to Mata Ahoi or Goddess Ahoi. She is worshiped by mothers for the well-being and long life of their children. This day is also known as Ahoi Aathe because fasting for Ahoi Ashtami is done during Ashtami Tithi which is the eighth day of the lunar month. Ahoi Mata is none other than Goddess Parvati.

==== Bhoogay ====
Bhoogay falls on the fourth day of the first half of the lunar month of Poh. The day is also called Sankat Chauth. The fast is kept by sisters for the well-being of brothers during the Punjabi month of Poh (December–January). Sisters will break their fast by eating sweet balls made of sesame, jaggery and flour Pinni.

== Sikh festivals ==
The following religious festivals are observed by Sikhs.

=== Muktsar Mela ===
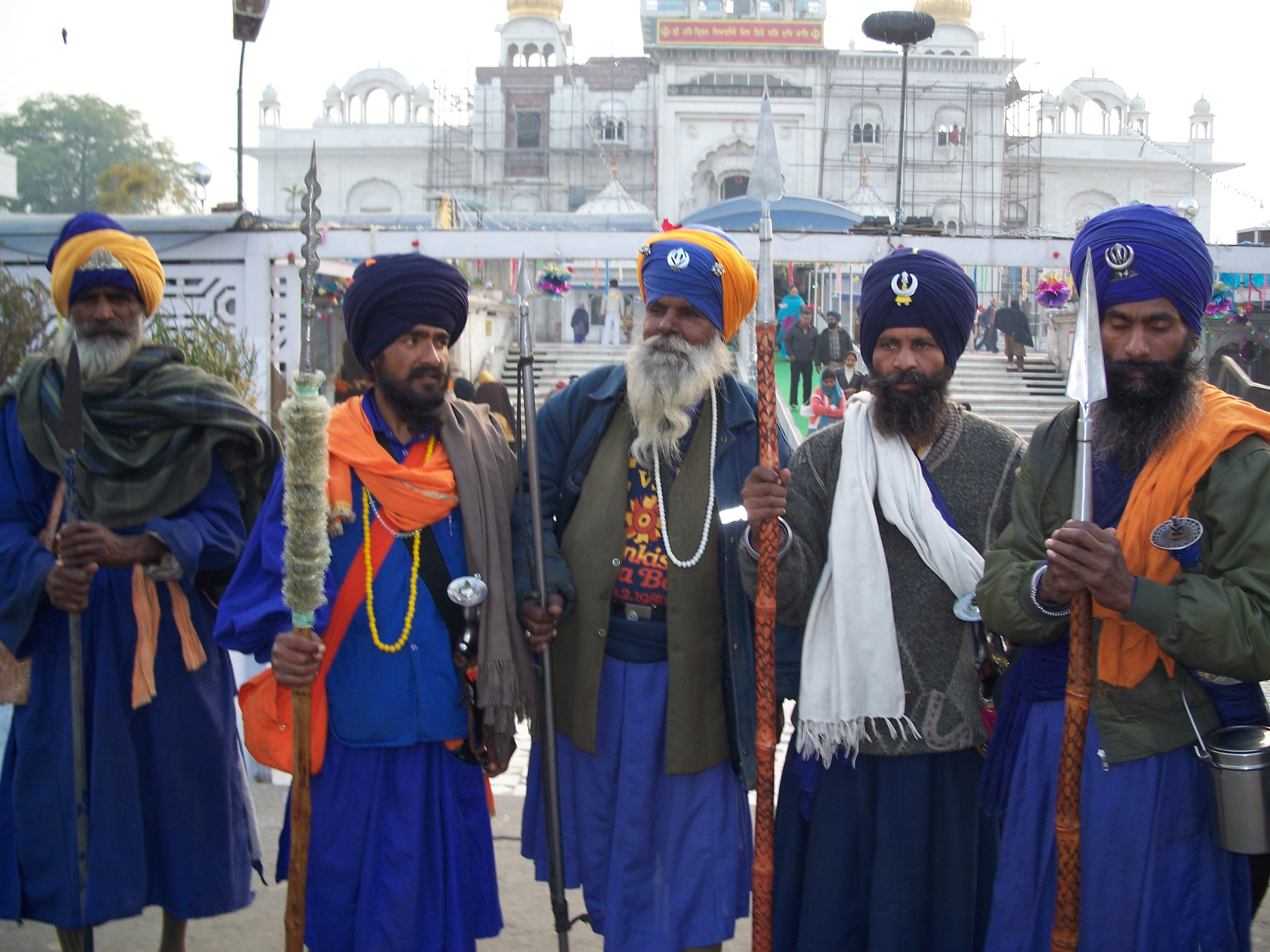
A group of Nihangs who are the chief guests at Maghi mela

This festival commemorates the Battle of Muktsar where the Chalis Mukte or the forty beloved died. Guru Gobind Singh Ji commemorated the martyrs by holding a gathering and performing Kirtan.

The Maghi fair is held to honour the memory of the forty Sikh warriors killed during the Battle of Muktsar in 1705. Muktsar, originally called Khidrana, was named as Muktsar ("the pool of liberation") following the battle. These forty Sikhs, led by their leader Mahan Singh, had formally deserted Sri Guru Gobind Singh in the need of hour, and signed a written memorandum to the effect. When Mai Bhago, a valiant and upright lady, heard of this cowardly act, she scolded the Singh's and inspired them refresh with spirit of bravery for which Sikhs are known. Hence, the unit went back and joined the Guru who was already engaged in action at Khidrana. All forty of them attained martyrdom. The memorandum (bedawa) was torn-down by the Guru himself just before Mahan Singh died.

People gather from all over Punjab, even other parts of India to join the festival which is in fact spread over many days. Merchants display their wares for sale, which include from trinkets to high-end electronics, the weapons Nihangs bear and especially agricultural machinery (since most around are farmers). The country's biggest circuses, Apollo and Gemini, are there as a matter of rule, merry-go-rounds and giant wheels, and the famous Well of Death (trick motorcycling inside a consortium of wood planks) are there.

=== Parkash Utsav Dasveh Patshah ===
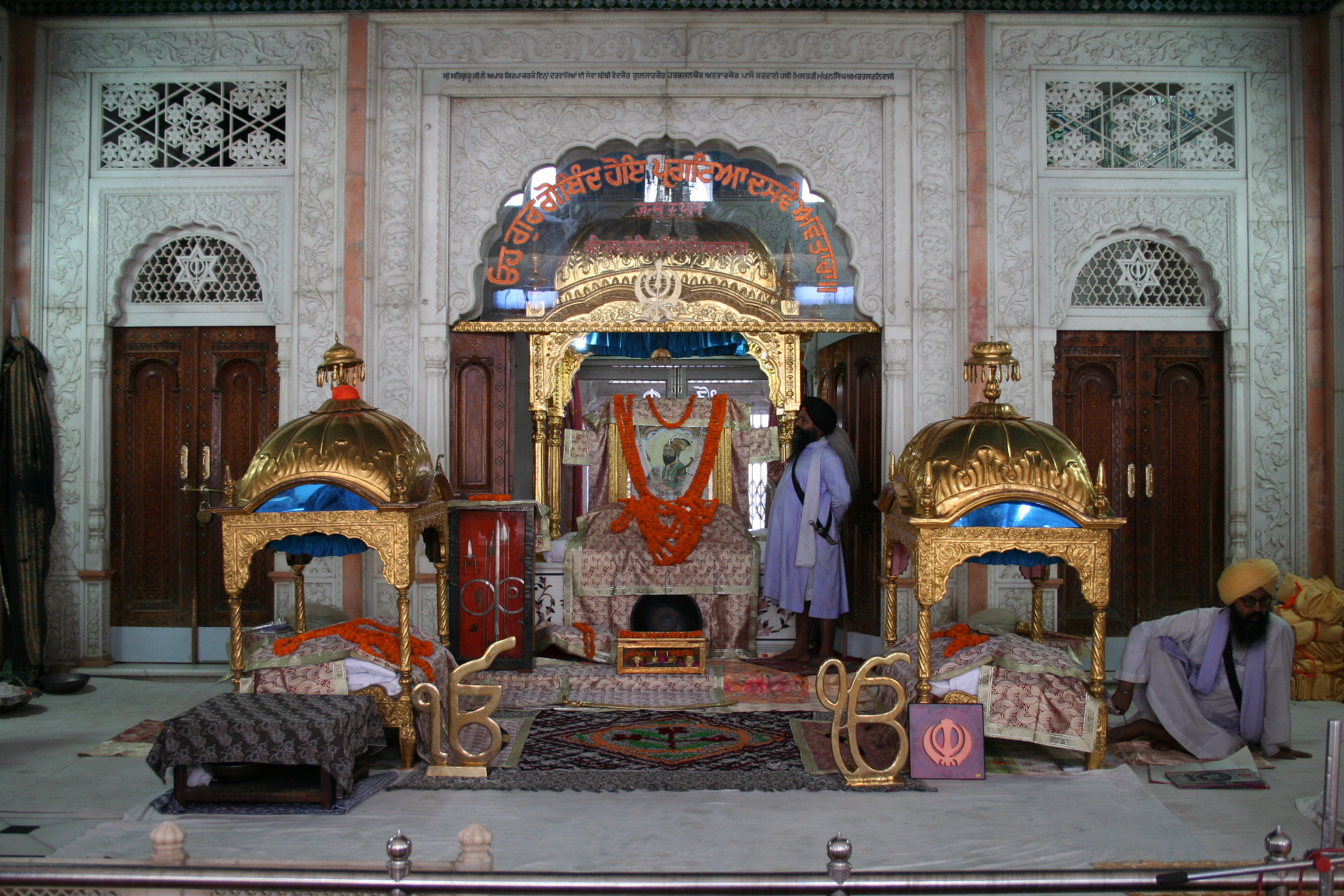
Guru Gobind Singh's birthplace in Patna, Bihar.

This festival's name, when translated, means the birth celebration of the 10th Divine Light, or Divine Knowledges. It commemorates the birth of Guru Gobind Singh, the tenth Sikh guru. The festival is one of the most widely celebrated event by Sikhs.

Gobind Singh was the only son of Guru Tegh Bahadur, the ninth Sikh guru, and Mata Gujri. He was born in Patna on 22 December 1666, Bihar in the Sodhi Khatri family while his father was visiting Bengal and Assam. His birth name was Gobind Rai, and a shrine named Takht Sri Patna Harimandar Sahib marks the site of the house where he was born and spent the first four years of his life. In 1670, his family returned to Punjab, and in March 1672 they moved to Chakk Nanaki in the Himalayan foothills of north India, called the Sivalik range, where he was schooled.

=== Hola Mohalla ===
An annual festival of thousands held at Anandpur Sahib. It was started by Guru Gobind Singh as a gathering of Sikhs for military exercises and mock battles. The mock battles were followed by kirtan and valour poetry competitions. Today the Nihang Singhs carry on the martial tradition with mock battles and displays of swordsmanship and horse riding. There are also a number of darbars where kirtan is sung. It is celebrated by Sikhs across the world as 'Sikh Olympics' with events and competitions of swordsmanship, horse riding, Gatka (Sikh martial arts), falconry and others by Nihang Singhs.

=== Vaisakhi ===
In Punjab it is celebrated as the birth of the Khalsa brotherhood. It is celebrated at a large scale at Kesgarh Sahib, Anandpur Sahib. In India, U.K., Canada, United States, and other Sikh populated areas, people come together for a public mela or parade. The main part of the mela is where a local Sikh Temple (Gurdwara) has a beautiful Sikh themed float on which the Guru Granth Sahib is located and every one offers their respect by bowing with much reverence and fervour. To mark the celebrations, Sikh devotees generally attend the Gurudwara before dawn with flowers and offerings in hands. Processions through towns are also common. Vaisakhi is the day on which the Khalsa was born and Sikhs were given a clear identity and a code of conduct to live by, led by the 10th Sikh Guru, Guru Gobind Singh Ji, who baptized the first Sikhs using sweet nectar called Amrit.

=== Martyrdom of Guru Arjan ===
The martyrdom anniversary of Guru Arjan, the fifth Guru, falls in June, the hottest month in India. He was tortured to death under the orders of Mughal Emperor, Jahangir, on the complaint of a Hindu banker Chandu Lal, who bore a personal enmity with Guru, at Lahore on 25 May 1606. Celebrations consist of Kirtan, Katha and Langar in the Gurdwara. Because of hot summer, chilled sweetened drink made from milk, sugar, essence and water is freely distributed in Gurdwaras and in neighborhoods to everybody irrespective of their religious belief as a sign and honour of the humble Guru who happily accepted his torture as a will of Waheguru and made no attempt to take any action.

=== Guru Nanak Gurpurab ===
On this day Guru Nanak was born in Nanakana Sahib, now situated in Pakistan. Every year Sikhs celebrate this day with large-scale gatherings. Candles, divas and lights are lit in Gurdwaras, in the honour of Guru along with fireworks. The birthday celebration usually lasts three days. Generally two days before the birthday, Akhand Path (forty-eight-hour non-stop reading of Guru Granth Sahib) is held in the Gurdwara. One day before the birthday, a procession is organized which is led by the Panj Pyares (Five Beloved Ones) and the Palki (Palanquin) of Sri Guru Granth Sahib and followed by teams of Ragis singing hymns, brass bands playing different tunes and devotees singing the chorus.

=== Sipanji ===
The Martyrdom of both the elder and younger Sahibzadas is a remembrance of the four young princes (sons of Guru Gobind Singh) who were martyred in late December. The two older sons, Sahibzade Ajit Singh and Jujhar Singh, were killed by Mughal soldiers during the battle of Chamkaur. Both the younger sons Sahibzade Zorawar Singh and Fateh Singh, were executed after being captured. These Martyrs are observed 21 December and 26 December respectively.

=== Bandi Chhor Divas ===
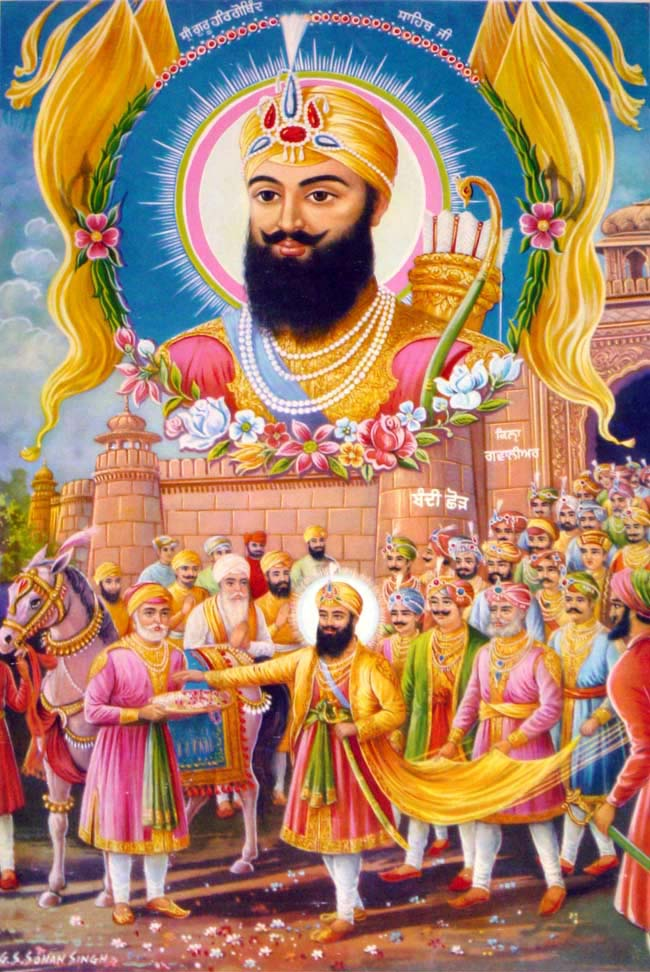
Guru Hargobind Ji is released from Gwalior Fort on Jahangir's order

Bandi Chhor Divas was celebrated when Guru Hargobind sahib ji was released from Gwalior prison with 52 Hindu kings and princes holding on to his robe or cape with 52 ropes.The guru let all 52 innocent rulers to safety without any signs of war or battle. In addition to Nagar keertan (a street procession) and an Akhand paath (a continuous reading of Guru Granth Sahib), Bandi Chhor (Shodh) Divas is celebrated with a fireworks display. The Sri Harmandir Sahib, as well as the whole complex, is festooned with thousands of shimmering lights. The gurdwara organizes continuous kirtan singing and special musicians. Sikhs consider this occasion as an important time to visit Gurdwaras and spend time with their families.

== Joint festivals ==
The following festivals are celebrated jointly by Hindus, Muslims and Sikhs and members of other faiths as Punjabi seasonal/cultural celebrations.

=== Lohri ===
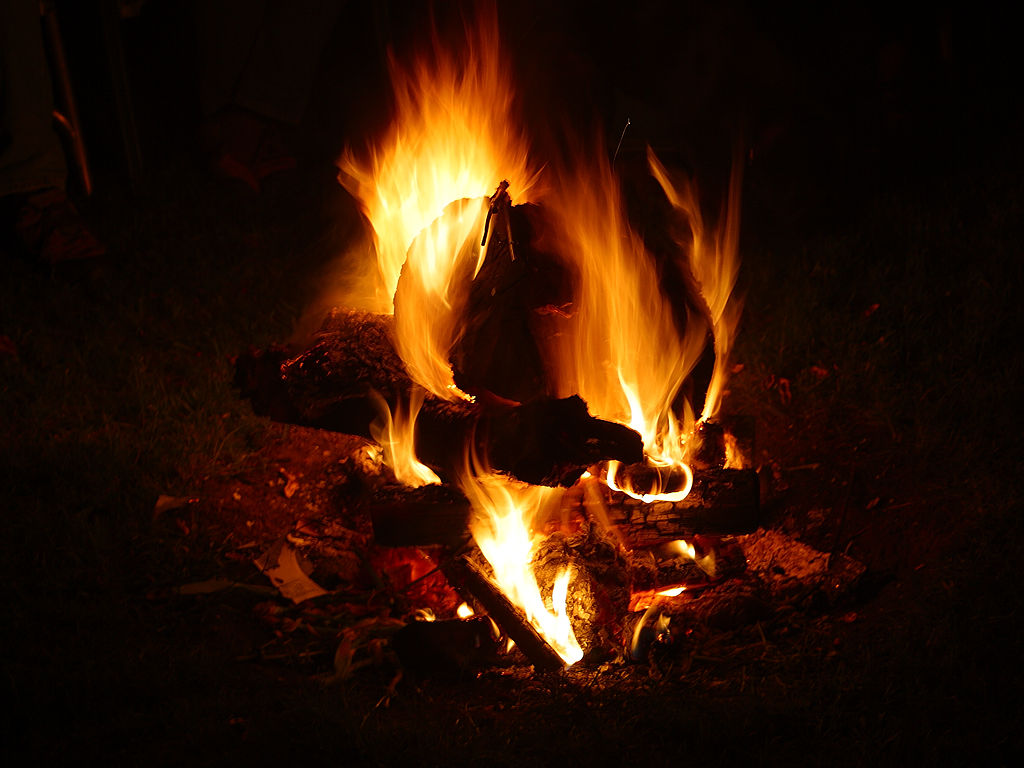
Lohri fire

Lohri is a cultural festival but for some Hindus it is considered a religious festival in North West India, the religious part being offerings made to sacred fire, Agni, lit on Lohri festival. The offering consists of sesame, jaggery, peanuts and popcorns. Besides Punjabi Hindus and Sikhs, Lohri is also celebrated by Dogras and other people of Jammu, people of Haryana and people from western and southern half of Himachal Pradesh. According to Chauhan (1995), all Punjabis, including Sikhs, Muslims and Christians celebrate Lohri in Punjab, India. Lohri is celebrated on the last day of the month of Poh (Pausha).

Many people believe the festival commemorates the passing of the winter solstice. Lohri is observed the night before Makar Sankranti, also known as Maghi, and according to the solar part of the Lunisolar Punjabi calendar (variation of the Bikrami calendar) and typically falls about the same date every year (January 13).

Lohri is an official gazetted holiday in the state of Punjab (India), but it is not a holiday in Punjab (Pakistan). It is, however, observed by Hindus, Sikhs, Muslims and Christians in Punjab, India and by some Punjabi Muslims, Hindus, Sikhs and Christians in Pakistan as well.

=== Maghi ===
The festival marks the increase in daylight. Maghi is celebrated by ritual bathing in holy water bodies and performing Daan (charity). Hindus will visit the Mandir and bathe is rivers and Sikhs will observe the day by visiting the Gurdwara and also bathe in rivers and pools to mark Mela Maghi. Punjabis will consume Khichdi (Boiled Rice and Lentil mixture) and Rauh di kheer which is rice pudding cooked in sugarcane juice on this occasion. Rauh Di Kheer is prepared in the evening before Maghi and is kept to cool. It is served cold next morning on Maghi with red-chilly mixed curd. Fairs are held at many places on Maghi.

=== Basant Panchami ===
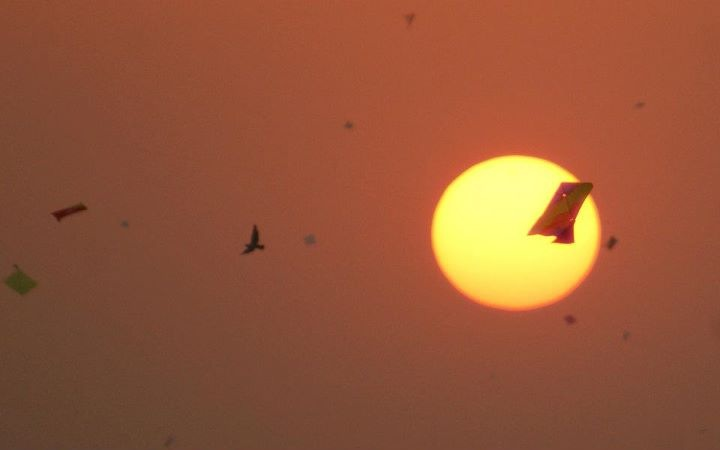
Kite flying on Basant

Basant Panchami is an ancient Hindu spring festival dedicated to god Kama as well as goddess Saraswati. Its link with the Hindu god of love and its traditions have led some scholars to call it "a Hindu form of Valentine's Day". The traditional colour of the day is yellow and the dish of the day is saffron rice. People fly kites.

In North India, and in the Punjab province of Pakistan, Basant is celebrated as a spring festival of kites. The festival marks the commencement of the spring season. In the Punjab region (including the Punjab province of Pakistan), Basant Panchami has been a long established tradition of flying kites and holding fairs.

Punjabi Muslims have treated parts of the festival as a cultural event. In Pakistan, however, kite flying has been banned starting in 2007 with officials stating that it uses dangerous, life-threatening substances on the strings. The festival ban was confirmed by the Pakistan Punjab state chief minister Shehbaz Sharif in 2017. According to some analysts, "the festival was banned due to pressure from hardline religious and extremist groups like the Hafiz Saeed-led Jamaat-ud Dawah, which claimed the festival had "Hindu origins" and was "un-Islamic".

=== Vaisakhi ===
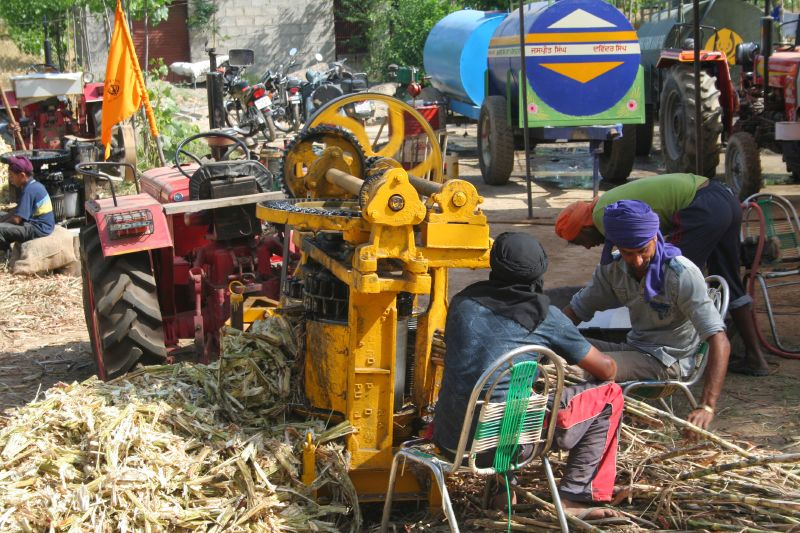
Two Sikh men celebrating Vaisakhi by giving away free sugarcane juice

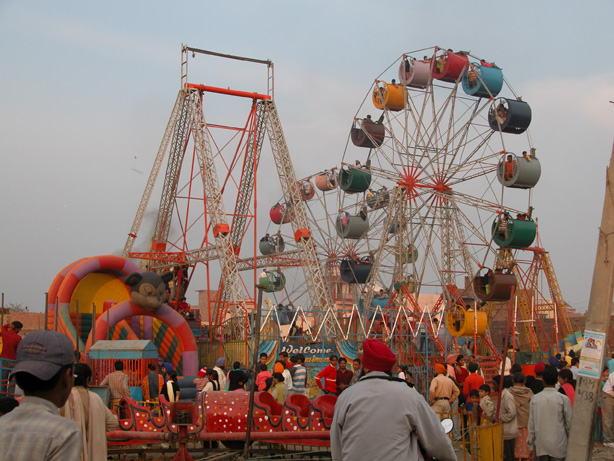
Vaisakhi mela

Vaisakhi is a religious festival of Sikhs. Vaisakhi marks the beginning of Sikh new year and the formation of the Khalsa. Punjabi Muslims observe the new year according to the Islamic calendar. Vaisakhi is also a harvest festival for people of the Punjab region. The harvest festival is celebrated by Punjabi Sikhs and Hindus. In the Punjab, Vaisakhi marks the ripening of the rabi harvest.

Vaisakhi additionally marks the Punjabi new year. This day is observed as a thanksgiving day by farmers whereby farmers pay their tribute, thanking God for the abundant harvest and also praying for future prosperity. Historically, during the early 20th century, Vaisakhi was a sacred day for Sikhs and Hindus and a secular festival for all Muslims and non-Muslims including Punjabi Christians. In modern times, sometimes Christians participate in Baisakhi celebrations along with Sikhs and Hindus.

According to Aziz-ud-din Ahmed, Lahore used to have Baisakhi Mela after the harvesting of the wheat crop in April. However, adds Ahmed, the city started losing its cultural vibrancy in the 1970s after Zia-ul-Haq came to power, and in recent years "the Pakistan Muslim League (N) government in Punjab banned kite flying through an official edict more under the pressure of those who want a puritanical version of Islam to be practiced in the name of religion than anything else". Unlike the Indian state of Punjab that recognizes the Vaisakhi Sikh festival as an official holiday, the festival is not an official holiday in Punjab or Sindh provinces of Pakistan where Islamic holidays are officially recognized instead. However, On 8 April 2016, Punjabi Parchar at Alhamra Arts Council (Lahore) organised a show called Visakhi mela, where the speakers pledged to "continue our struggle to keep the Punjabi culture alive" in Pakistan through events such as Visakhi Mela. Elsewhere Besakhi fairs or melas are held in various places including Eminabad and Dera Ghazi Khan. (Note: Security concerns are another reason for the lack of holding fairs which lead to the Baisakhi mela in Gujranwala to mark wheat harvesting being cancelled in 2015. Despite the bomb blast at the Sakhi Sarwar sufi shrine in Dera Ghazi Khan in 2011, the Baisakhi mela around the water channel near the shrine that continues until the wheat harvest was integrated with the annual Urs of the saint in 2012.)

==== Aawat pauni ====
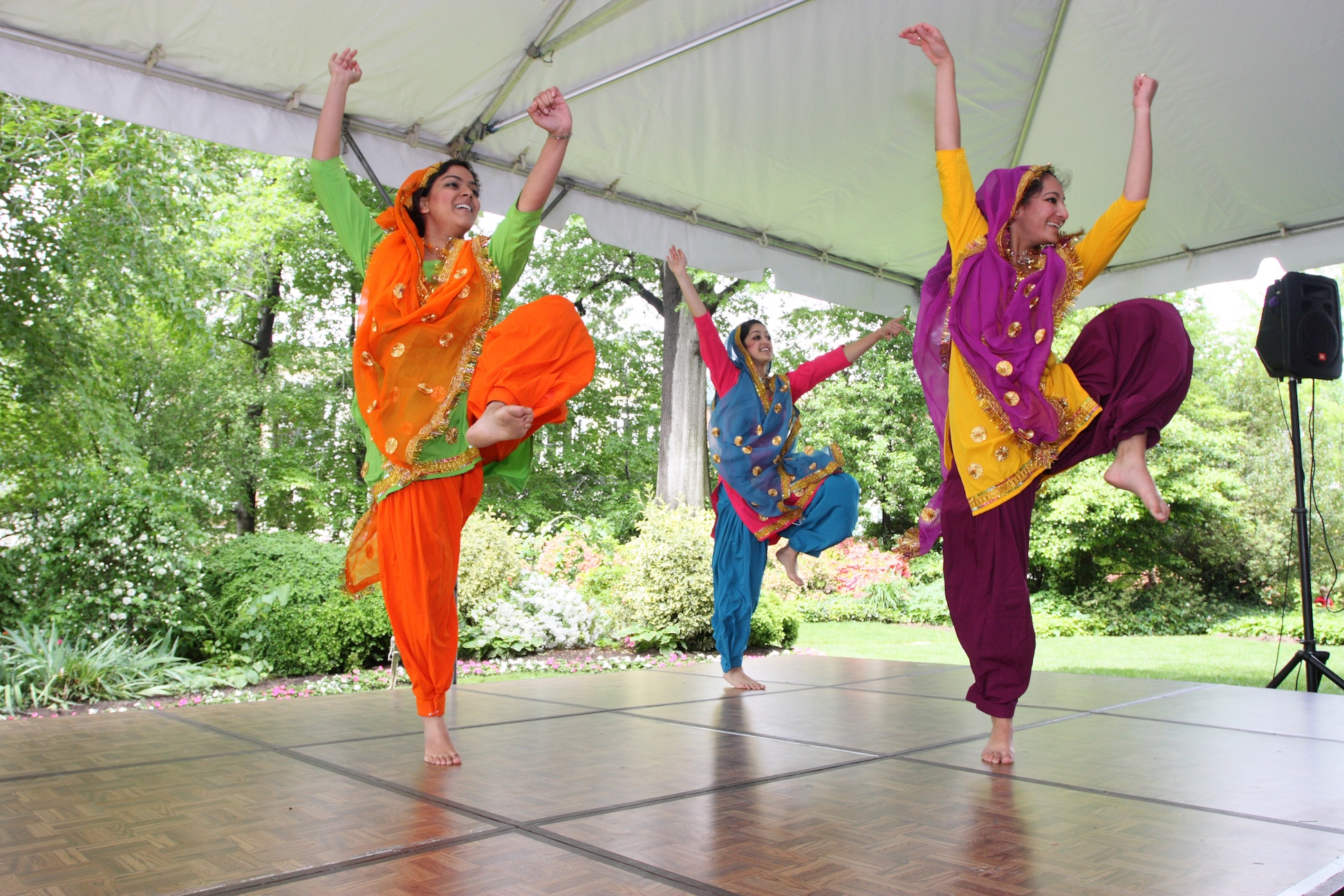
Bhangra dance on Vaisakhi is a Sikh tradition

Aawat pauni is a tradition associated with harvesting, which involves people getting together to harvest the wheat. Drums are played while people work. At the end of the day, people sing dohay to the tunes of the drum.

==== Fairs and dances ====
The harvest festival is also characterized by the folk dance, Bhangra which traditionally is a harvest dance.

Fairs or Melas (fair) are held in many parts of Punjab, India to mark the new year and the harvesting season. Vaisakhi fairs take place in various places, including Jammu city, Kathua, Udhampur, Reasi and Samba, in the Pinjore complex near Chandigarh, in Himachal Pradesh cities of Rewalsar, Shimla, Mandi and Prashar Lakes.

=== Teeyan ===
Teeyan welcomes the monsoon season and the festival officially starts of the day of Teej and last for 13 days. The seasonal festival involves women and girls dancing Gidha and visiting family. The festival is observed in Punjab, India as a cultural festival by all communities.

The festival is celebrated during the monsoon season from the third day of the lunar month of Sawan on the bright half, up to the full moon of sawan, by women. Married women go to their maternal house to participate in the festivities. In the past, it was traditional for women to spend the whole month of Sawan with their parents.

Teej is historically a Hindu festival, dedicated to Goddess Parvati and her union with Lord Shiva, one observed in northern, western, central and Himalayan regions of the Indian subcontinent.

=== =Rakhri ===
Rakhri or Rakhrhee (Punjabi: ਰੱਖੜੀ) is the Punjabi word for Rakhi and a festival observed by Hindus and Sikhs. In the Punjab region, the festival of Raksha Bandhan is celebrated as Rakhrhya (Punjabi: ਰੱਖੜੀਆ). Rakhrhya is observed on the same day of the lunar month of Sawan. It, like Raksha Bandhan, celebrates the relationship between brothers and sisters. Rakhri means "to protect" whereby a brother promises to look out for his sister and in return, a sister prays for the well-being of her brother. According to Fedorak (2006), the festival of Rakhri celebrates "the bonds between brothers and sisters". Married women often travel back to their natal homes for the occasion.

A Rakhri can also be tied on a cousin or an unrelated man. If a woman ties a Rakhri on the wrist of an unrelated man, their relationship is treated as any other brother and sister relationship would be. The festival is a Siblings Day comparable to Mother's Day/Father's Day/Grandparents' Day etc.

A sister will tie the Rakhri on her brother's wrist and her brother will traditionally give his sister a gift in exchange. Another feature of the celebration is the consumption of sweets. There is no special ceremony but a sister will sing folk songs and say something along the lines of:

Punjabi:

ਸੂਰਜ ਛੱਡੀਆਂ ਰਿਸ਼ਮਾਂ

ਮੂਲੀ ਛੱਡਿਆਂ ਬੀਅ

ਭੈਣ ਨੇ ਬੰਨੀ ਰੱਖੜੀ

ਜੁਗ ਜੁਗ ਵੀਰਾ ਜੀਅ

Transliteration:

Suraj chhadya rishma

mooli chhadya bi

bhain ne banni rahkhree

jug jug veera ji

=== Punjabi Culture Day ===
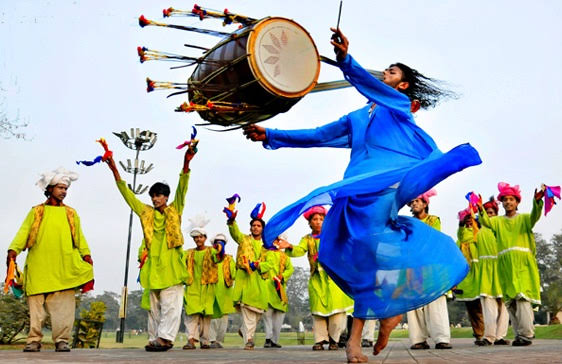
Punjabi cultural celebration in Punjab, Pakistan

Punjabi culture day is celebrated on 14 March all over Punjab for the celebration and demonstration of Punjabi culture by Punjabis and Punjabi diaspora.

== Muslim festivals ==
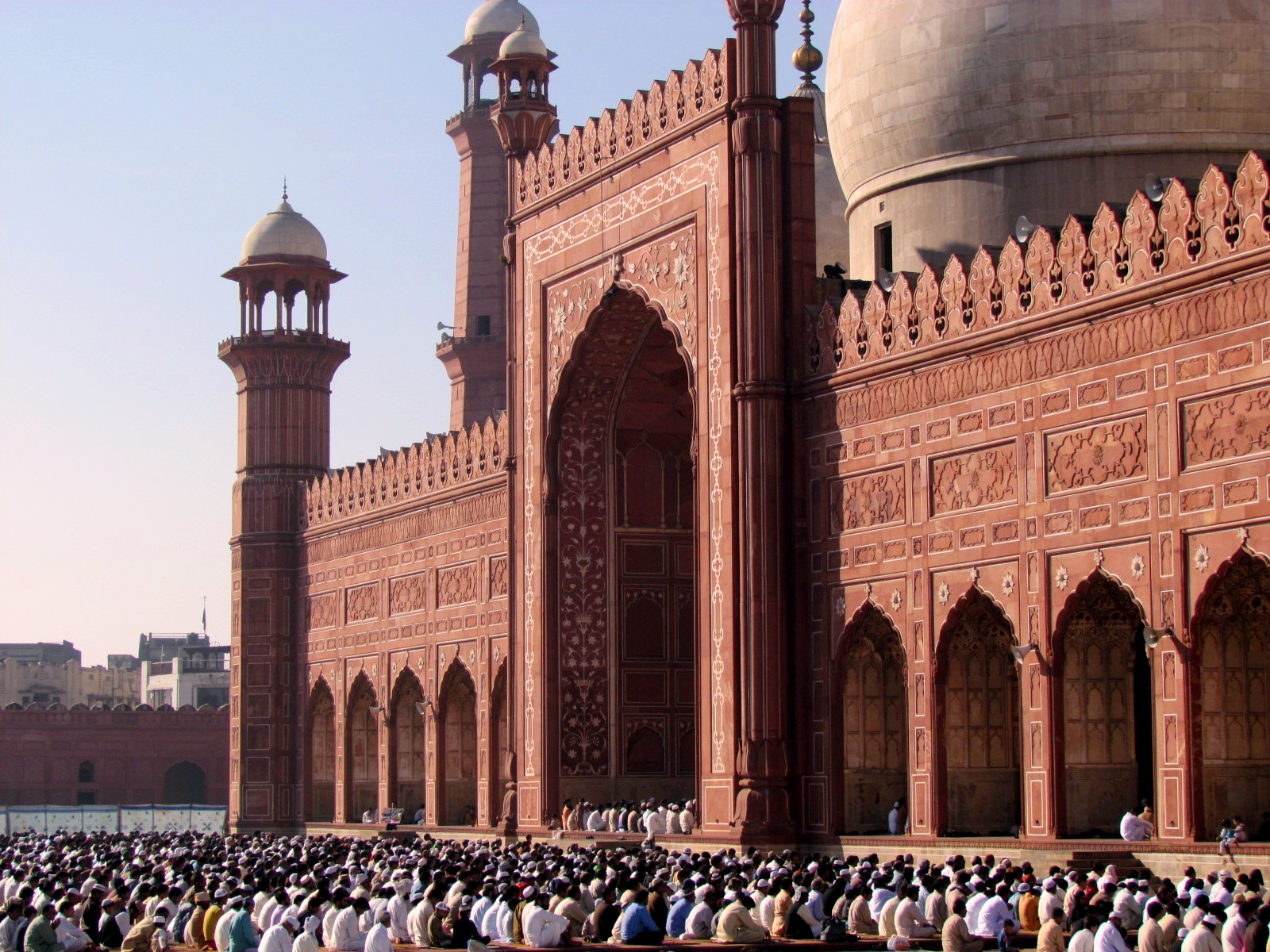
Eid prayer in Badshahi Mosque, Lahore

The following religious festivals are observed by Punjabi Muslims.

=== Eid ul-Adha ===
Eid ul-Adha is also known as Eid-ul-Azha. The festival is celebrated on the tenth day of the last Islamic month of Dhul-hijjah. Eid-ul-Azha occurs about two months after Eid-ul-Fitr. Eid-ul-Azha is celebrated to commemorate the occasion when the Ibrahim (Abraham) was ready on God's command to sacrifice his son, Ismail, whom God then replaced Ismail with a goat. Muslims make pilgrimage (hajj) to Mecca during this time.

Animal sacrifice is a tradition offered by Muslims on this day. Special markets are set up to deal with the increase in demand of animals. Cattle markets are set up in places such as Multan, (Punjab, Pakistan) and goat markets in Ludhiana, (Punjab, India). The children celebrate Eid ul-Adha and Eid ul-Fitr with great pump and show and receive gifts and Eidi (money) from parents and others.

=== Eid-ul-Fitr ===
Eid al-Fitr takes place on the first day of the tenth month of the Islamic lunar calendar and celebrates the end of Ramadan. Ramadan is the time of fasting that continues throughout the ninth month. On this day, after a month of fasting, Muslims express their joy and happiness by offering a congregational prayer in the mosques. Special celebration meals are served. The festival is celebrated in Punjab, Pakistan. It is also celebrated in Malerkotla (Punjab, India) which has a sizable Muslim population where Sikhs and Hindus also participate in the observance.

=== Eid-e-Milad-un-Nabi ===
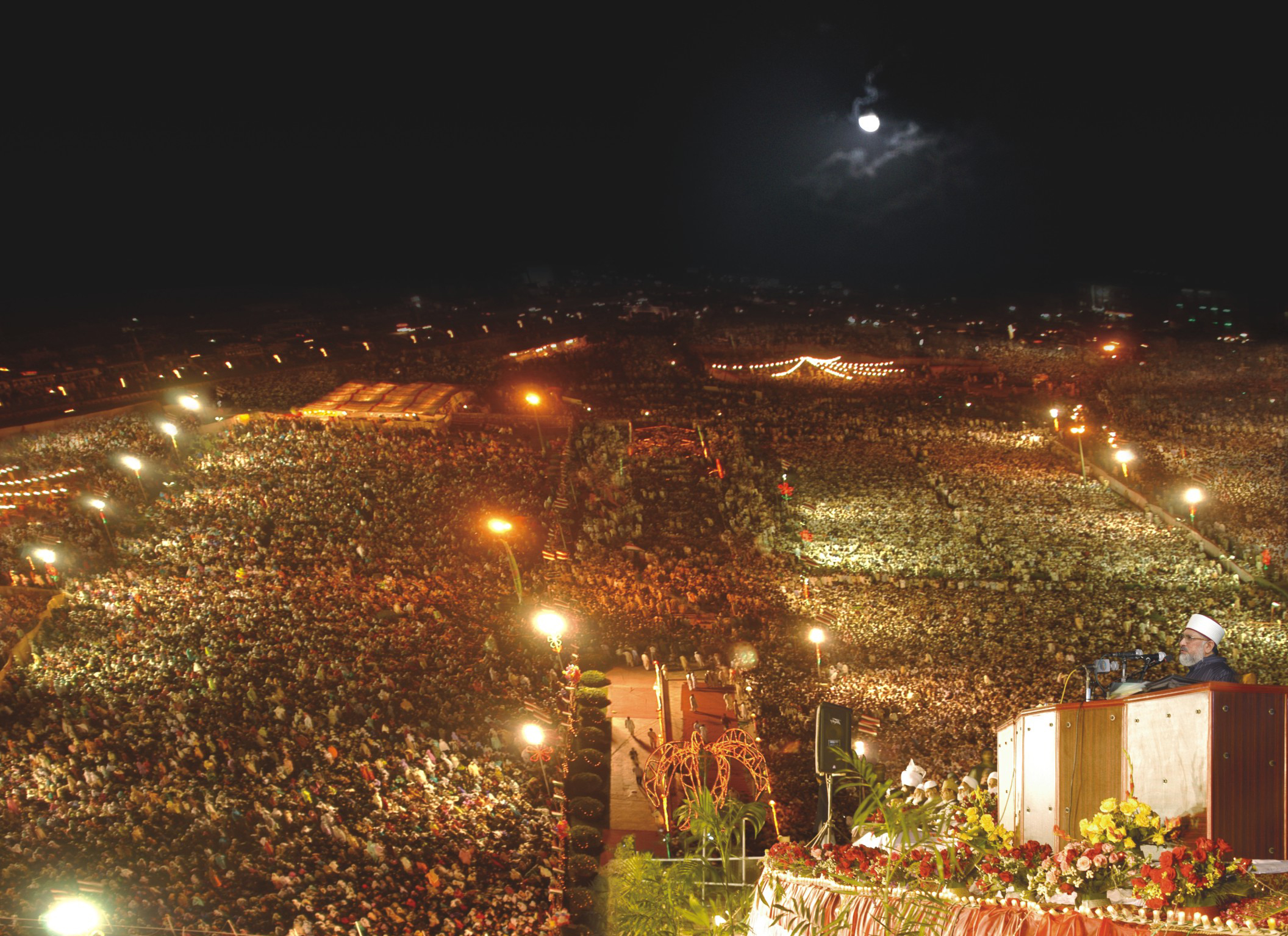
International Mawlid Conference, Minar-e-Pakistan, Lahore, Pakistan.

Eid-e-Milad-un- Nabi is an Islamic festival which is celebrated in honour of the birth-day of Muhammad. The festival is observed in the third month of the Islamic lunar calendar called Rabi'al-Awal. Various processions take place in Lahore to celebrate the festival. According to Nestorovic (2016), hundreds of thousands of people gather at Minare-Pakistan, Lahore, between the intervening night of 11th and 12th Rabi' al-awwal of the Islamic calendar Eid Milad Dun Nabi. The festival was declared a national holiday in Pakistan in 1949.

People from various places in Punjab, Pakistan including Bahawalpur, Faisalabad, Multan and Sargodha participate in processions and engage in decorating Mosques, streets and houses with green flags and lights. According to Khalid, children, teenagers and young adults decorate their Pahari (mountain) of all sorts of toys, including cars, stereos, and numerous other commodities. Within various places of Lahore, there are numerous stalls. Before the festival became a celebratory day, people used to celebrate the day quietly. However, the first procession to mark the day was led from Delhi gate in Lahore in 1935. This tradition then became popular elsewhere. Processions are also taken out in Bathinda (Punjab, India).

=== Muharram ===
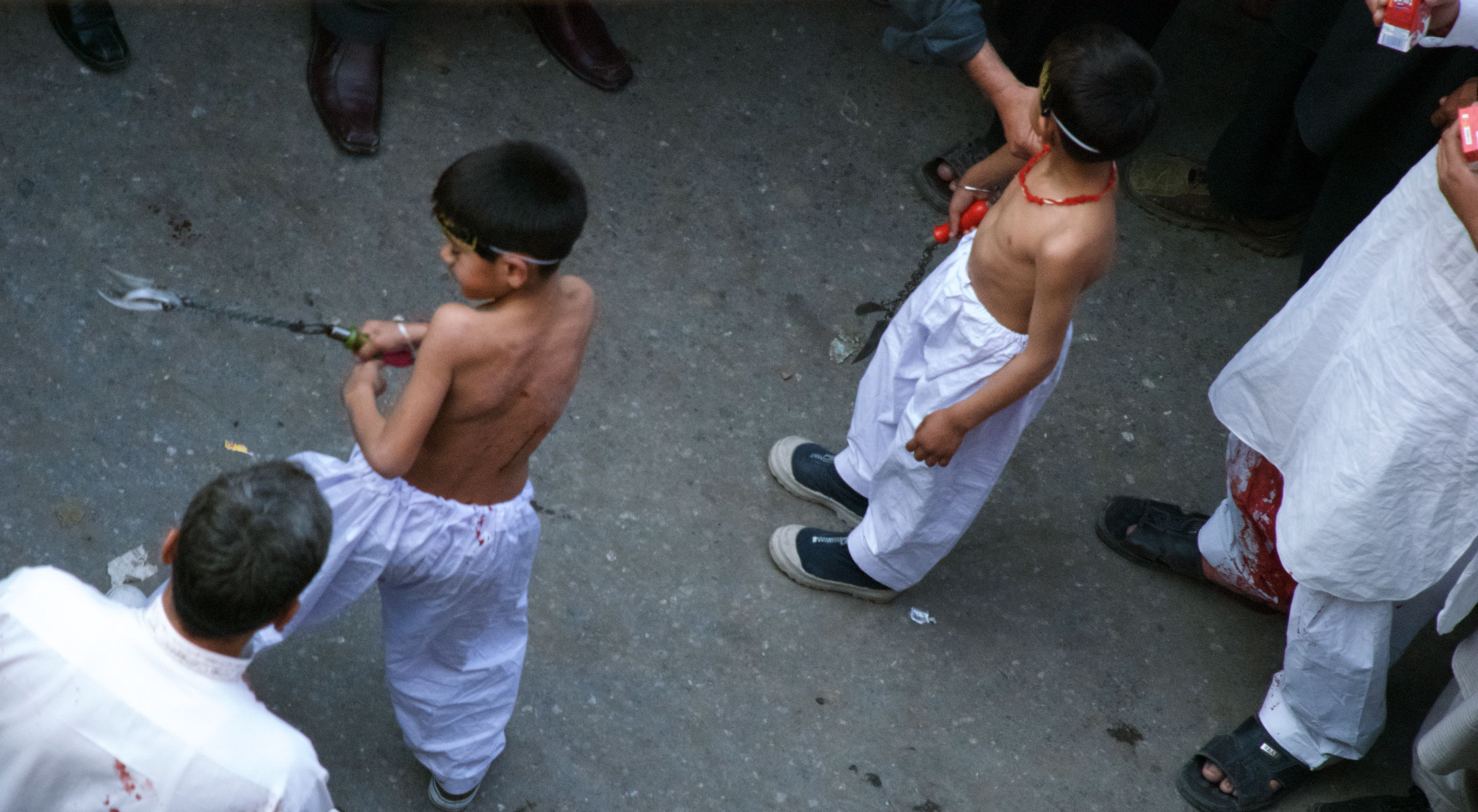
A street observation of Muharram in Lahore Pakistan

Remembrance of Muharram is a set of rituals associated with Shia, which takes place in Muharram, the first month of the Islamic calendar. Many of the events associated with the ritual take place in congregation halls known as Hussainia. The event marks the anniversary of the Battle of Karbala when Imam Hussein ibn Ali, the grandson of Muhammad, was killed by the forces of the second Umayyad caliph Yazid I at Karbala. Family members, accompanying Hussein ibn Ali, were killed or subjected to humiliation. The commemoration of the event during yearly mourning season, from first of Muharram to twentieth of Safar with Ashura comprising the focal date, serves to define Shia communal identity.

In Pakistani Punjab, Muharram is celebrated twice, once according to the Muslim year and again on the 10th of harh.

==== Processions ====
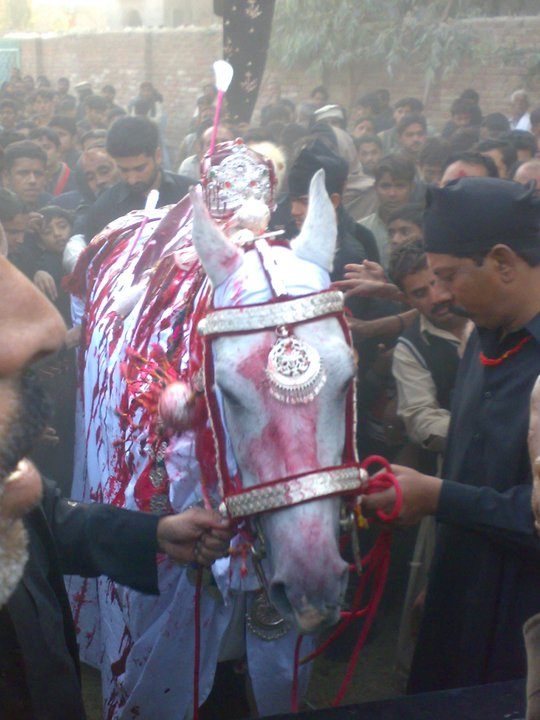
Ashura procession in Layyah, Punjab, Pakistan

Traditionally, a white horse representing Ali's white Mule Duldul, is usually lead in the Muharram procession, as in Jhang, Punjab, Pakistan. Zuljanah, Tazia and Alam processions are observed in many places in Punjab, Pakistan including Sialkot, Gujranwala, Bahawalnagar, Sargodha, Bahawalpur. and Lahore.

===== Zuljana =====
Zuljanah processions are held which involves taking a replica of a horse. The Zuljanah has two wings and the processions were introduced from Iran to Lahore during the 19th century.

===== Tazia =====
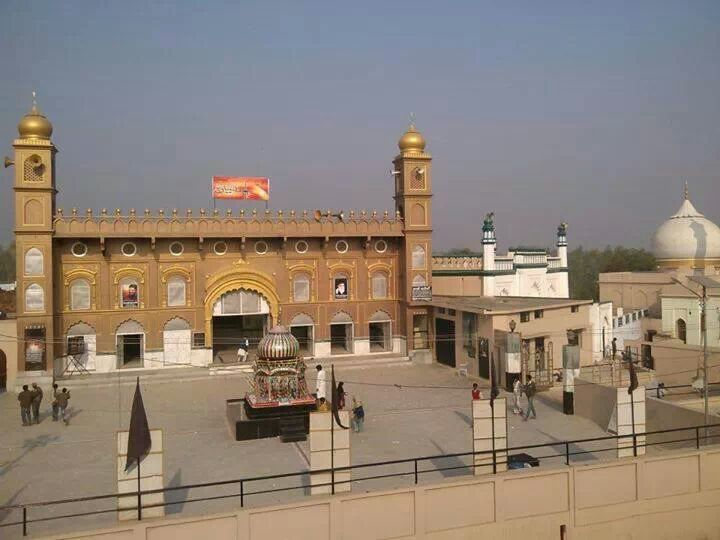
Tazia at Jama Masjid, Delhi

Shia Muslims take out a tazia procession on the day of Ashura. A Tazia is traditionally a bamboo and paper model of Hussain's tomb at Karbala, which is carried in procession by Shias on the tenth day of the month of Muharram. Moderns forms of Tazia can be more elaborate. Tazia processions in Punjab are historic and were observed during the Sikh and British period when the Tazia would be divided into many storeys, but not ordinarily more than three. Such processions take place in Lahore where mourners take to the streets to commemorate the sacrifices of Imam Hussain and his family in Karbala. Various stalls are set up offering milk, water and tea along the route of the processions. Some distribute juice packets, dry fruit, sweetmeats and food among mourners. Tazia processions can also be seen in Malerkotla and Delhi.

===== Alam =====
Alam processions take place in Punjab, Pakistan too. Alam is an elaborate, heavy battle standard, carried by a standard bearer, alam-dar, ahead of the procession. It represents Imam Hussain's standard and is revered as a sacred object.

== Local festivals ==
Various local fairs and festivals are associated with particular shrines, temples and gurdwaras.

=== Mela Chiragan ===
Mela Chiraghan (Festival of Lights) is a three-day annual festival to mark the urs (death anniversary) of the Punjabi Sufi poet and saint Shah Hussain (1538–1599) who lived in Lahore in the 16th century. It takes place at the shrine of Shah Hussain in Baghbanpura, on the outskirts of Lahore, Pakistan, adjacent to the Shalimar Gardens.

=== Rath Yatra Nabha ===
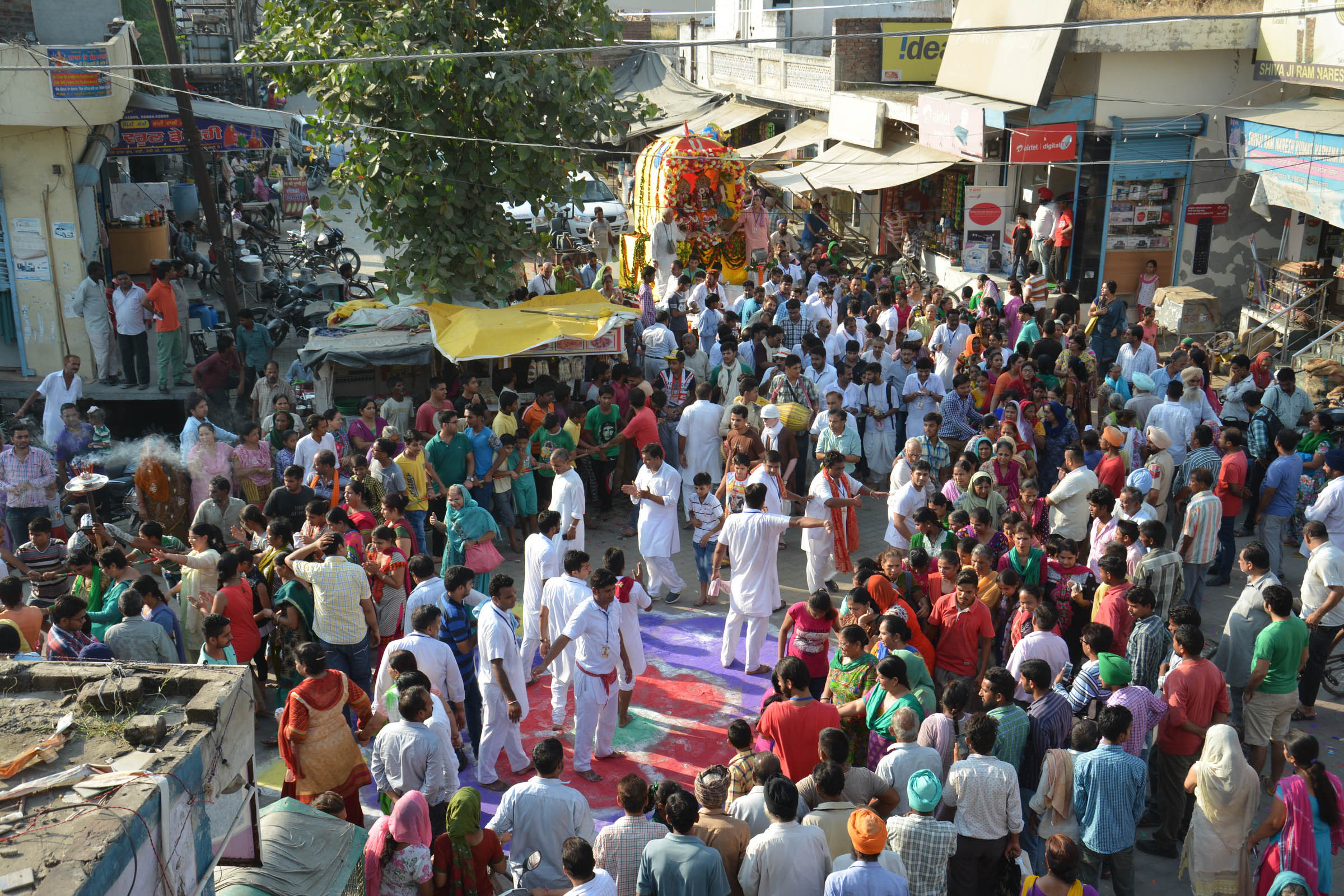
Nabha Ratha Yatra

Rath Yatra Nabha, Ratha Jatra or Chariot Festival is a Hindu festival associated with the god Jagannath held at Mandir Thakur Shri Saty Narayan Ji in the Nabha City, state of Punjab, India. This annual festival is celebrated in the month of August or September. The festival is connected to Jagannath's visit to Nabha city.

== See also ==
- Punjabi culture
- Punjabi Culture Day
- List of fairs and festivals in Punjab, India
- Punjabi festivals (Pakistan)
- Punjabi calendar
- Livestock show
- Lohri
- Vaisakhi
- Sikh festivals
- Folk practices in Punjab
