= Punjabiyat =

Punjabi language revitalisation movement

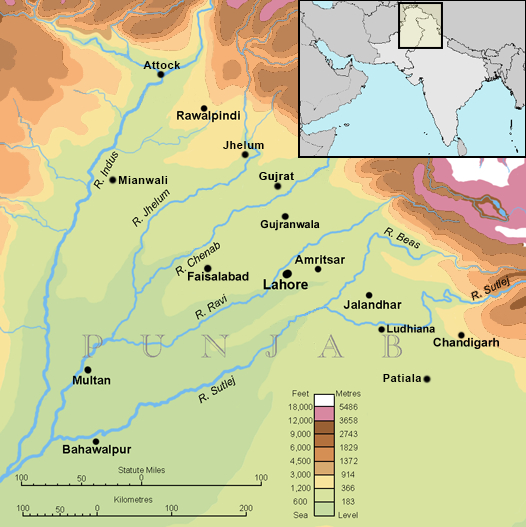
A map depicting the region of Punjab, undivided, commonly used for the idea of punjabiyat.

Punjabiyat, (Shahmukhi: پنجابیت, Gurmukhi: ਪੰਜਾਬੀਅਤ) meaning "Punjabiness", is a movement amongst Punjabis that supports closer links with Punjabi cultural traditions and lifestyle and the revitalization of the Punjabi language. It is also a movement for unity in which shared regional, economic, and agrarian identity matters more than religious divisions.

It focuses on being Punjabi first in a cultural and linguistic sense, while respecting the existing religions and traditions that exist within Punjab; Punjabiyat encompasses emphasis on the language of Punjab as the common cultural language, a common connection to the five rivers, villages, fields, and cities of Punjab, the music, poetry, folk traditions, dance, food and festivals of Punjab, the community and hospitality of Punjab, the recognition of Sikh, Muslim, Hindu, and other contributions to the civilisation of Punjab, and pride of Punjabi history, achievements, and traditions.

== Aims and goals ==
In Pakistan, its goal is a better status of Punjabi language along with Urdu at state level. In India, its goal is to bring the Sikh, Hindu and Muslim communities together.

The movement's supporters in the Punjabi diaspora focus on the promotion of a shared cultural heritage, usually by using key figures such as Ranjit Singh, Sufi saints, and the Sikh gurus scriptures to offer a shared moral and philosophical lexicon, and promoting a regional political identity, rather than division amongst religions.

== Link to Sikh nationalism ==
Punjabiyat also has close links to Sikh nationalism due to the religious significance of Punjabi and the Gurmukhi script in Sikhism. With the advent of the notion of the Devanagari script, the association of Hindi and Sanskrit with Hindu nationalism, and the Arya Samaj advancing the cause of Devanagari in the late 19th century, the cause of Gurmukhi was advanced by Singh Sabha movement. This later culminated in Punjabi Suba movement where Sikhs who mostly identified Punjabi as their mother tongue, while Hindus identifying with Hindi in the census, leading to trifurcation of state on a linguistic basis in 1966 and the formation of a Sikh majority, Punjabi speaking state in India. During the Khalistan movement, Kharkus were known to enforce Punjabi language, Gurmukhi script and traditional Punjabi cultural dress in Punjab. SGPC in its 1946 Sikh State resolution declared the Punjab region as the natural homeland of the Sikhs. Anandpur Sahib Resolution also links Sikhism to Punjab as a Sikh homeland.

== See also ==
- Punjabi culture
- Punjabi Culture Day
- Punjabi festivals
- Punjabi Wikipedia
- Punjabi nationalism

== Sources ==
- Jolly, Schona (March 1, 2011). "Bringing Punjabiyat Back". The Caravan. Archived from the original on 2011-03-04.
