= Punjabi Culture Day =

Honors the heritage and culture of Punjab

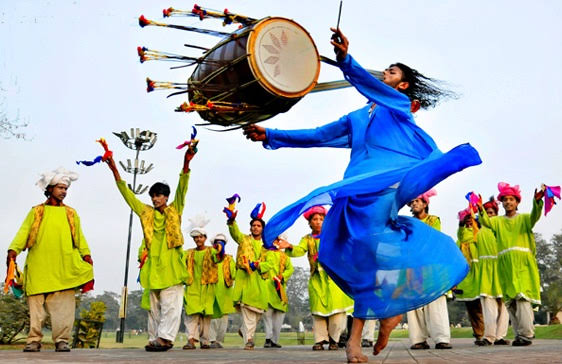
- Punjabi Cultural celebration
- Observed by: People of Punjab and by Punjabi community all over the world
- Type: Cultural
- Significance: Honors the Punjabi heritage and Punjabi culture
- Celebrations: Punjabi folk dancing; Historical & Cultural exhibitions; Singing Punjabi folk songs, and Punjabi poetry; Family & social gatherings
- Date: 14th March (1st Chet of Punjabi calendar)
- 2025 date: 14 March
- 2026 date: 14 March
- Frequency: Annual

Punjabi Culture Day, also known as Punjabi New Year, is a Punjabi festival celebrated on the first day (1 Chet) of the Punjabi calendar, corresponding to 14 March. It is observed throughout the Punjab for the celebration and demonstration of Punjabi culture by Punjabis, and also among the Punjabi diaspora.

== Celebration ==
On Punjabi Culture Day, events such as music, dance, bhangra, plays, exhibition, film festival, food and traditional dresses in the form of stalls to introduce cultural values to new generations of Punjabis. In different programmes, tribute are paid to masters in the field of Fine Arts with purpose of promoting love and courtesy on national level. 2020 Punjab Culture Day celebrated Punjab's customary festivities and traditional colours on March 14 at Lahore's Alhamra Arts Council. Government of Punjab, Pakistan, under Chief Minister approved the celebrations of Punjab Culture Day at national level. Chief Minister described that the purpose to observe the Punjab Culture Day is to highlight different facets of Punjab culture and the land of Punjab is filled with hospitality, love and affection.

== Gallery ==
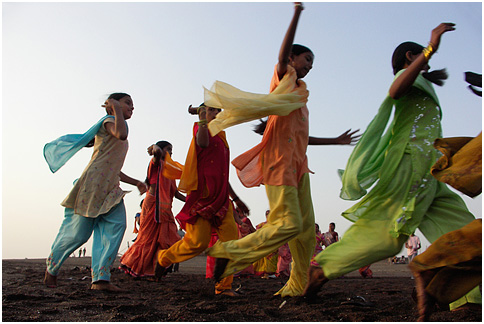

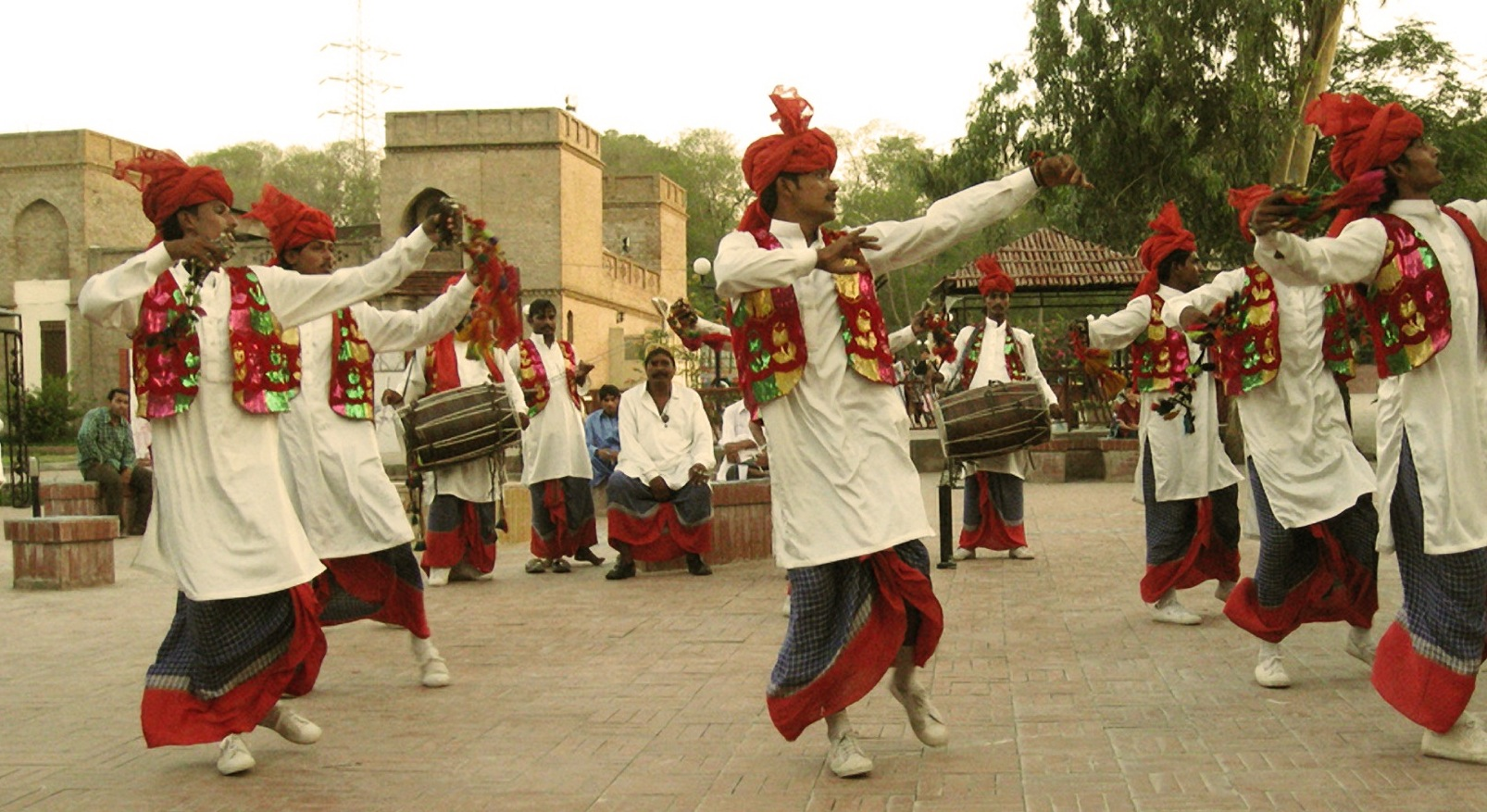

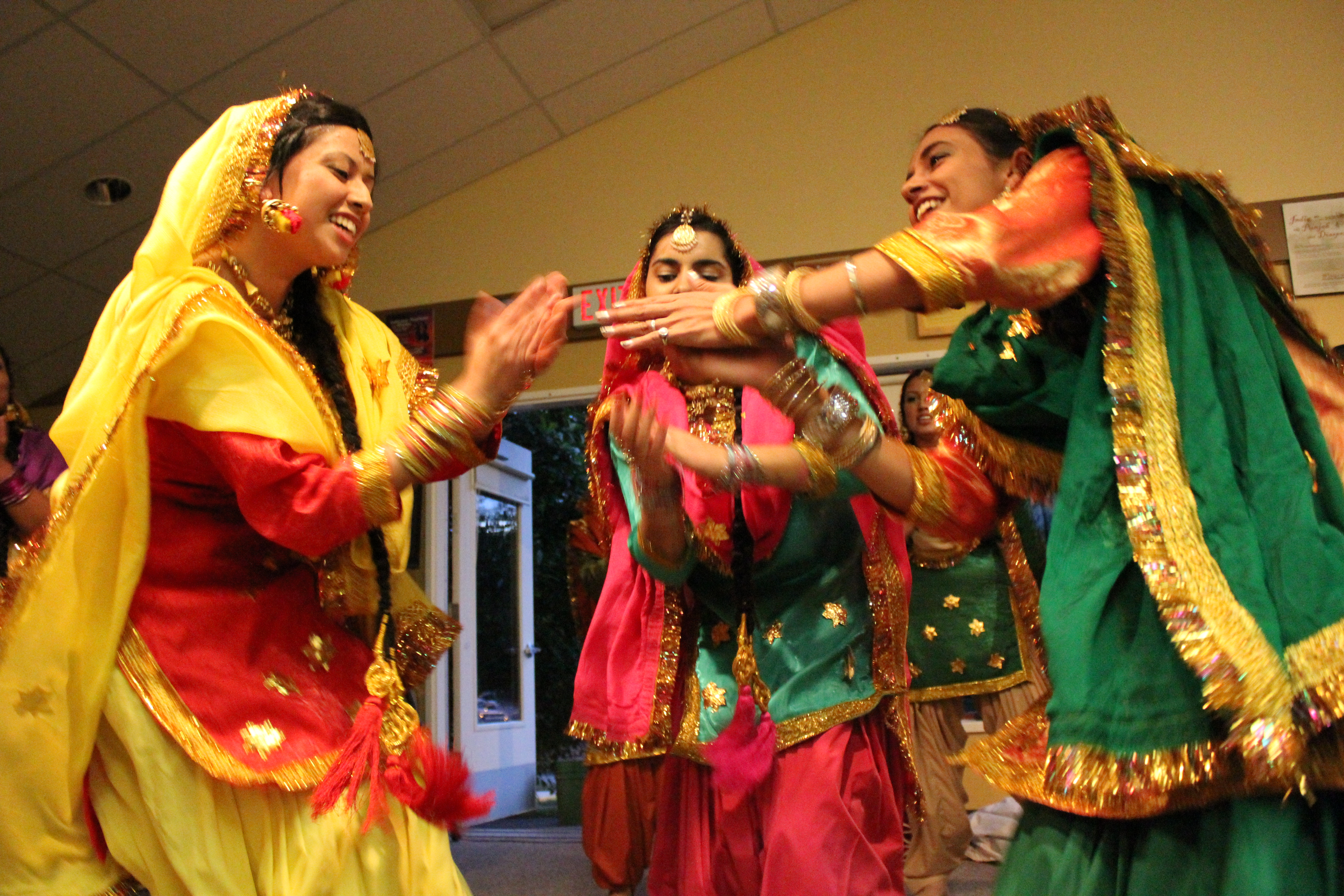

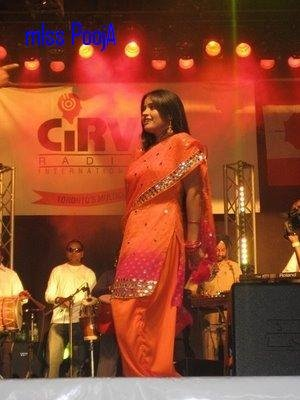

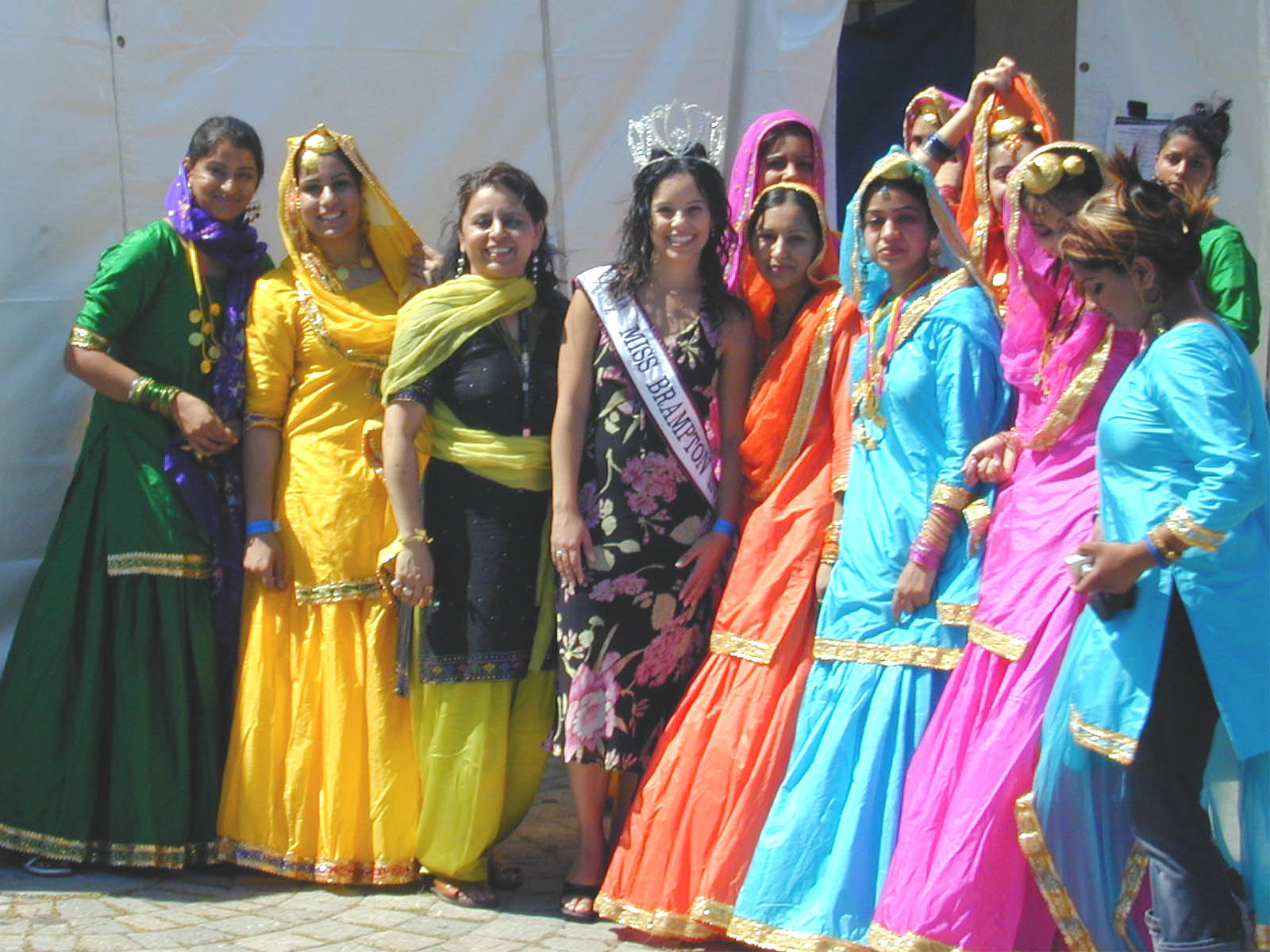

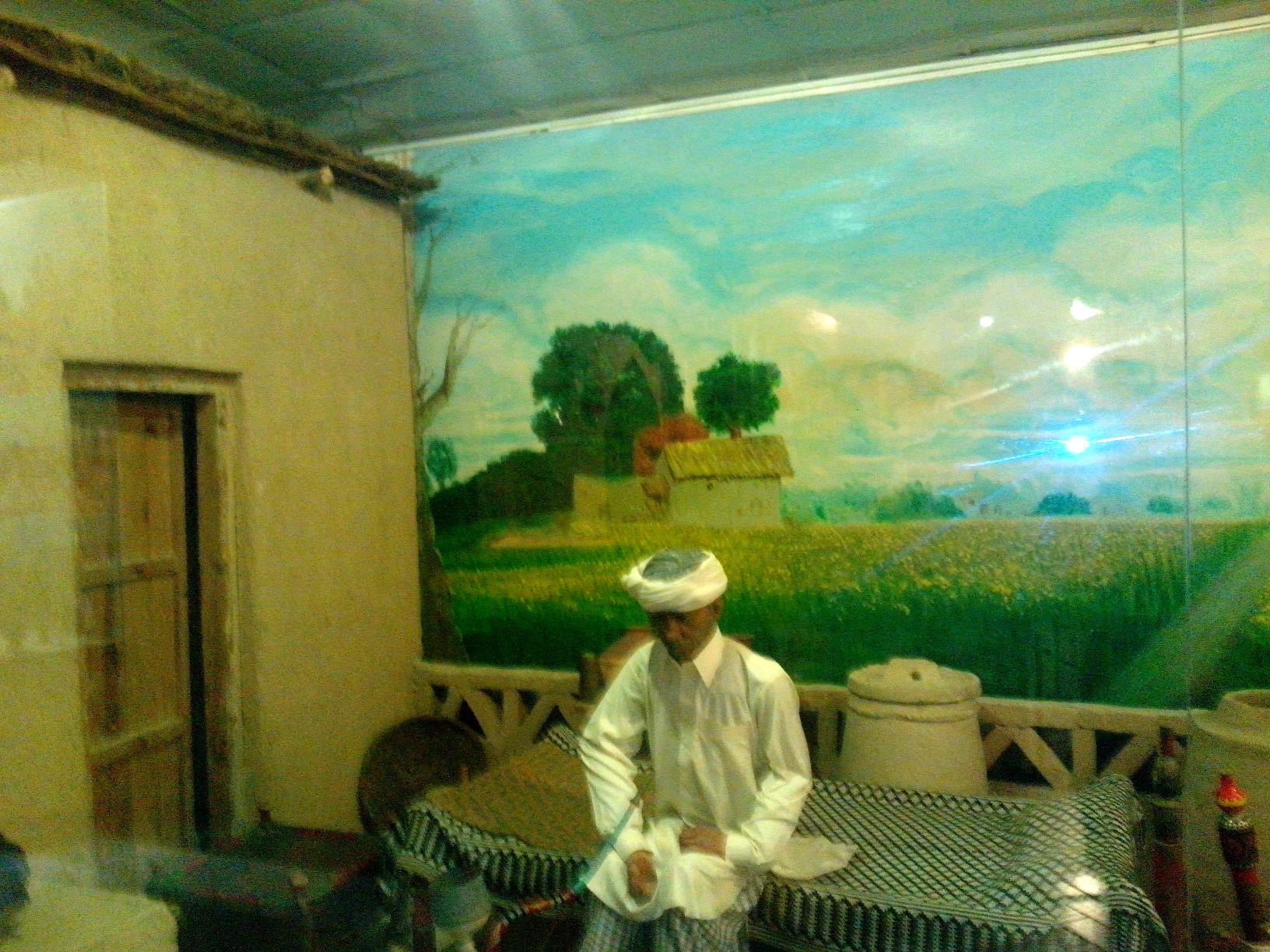

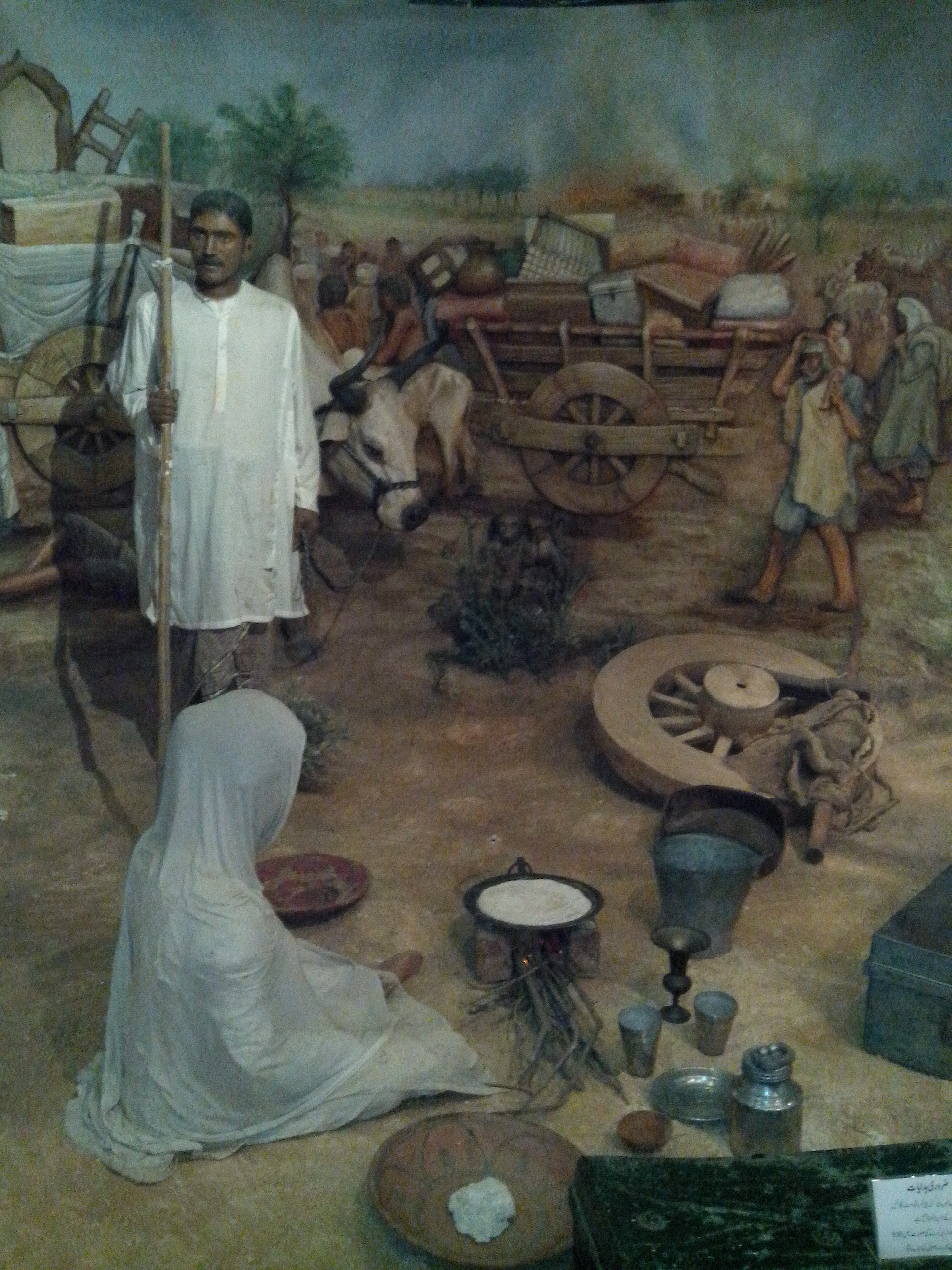

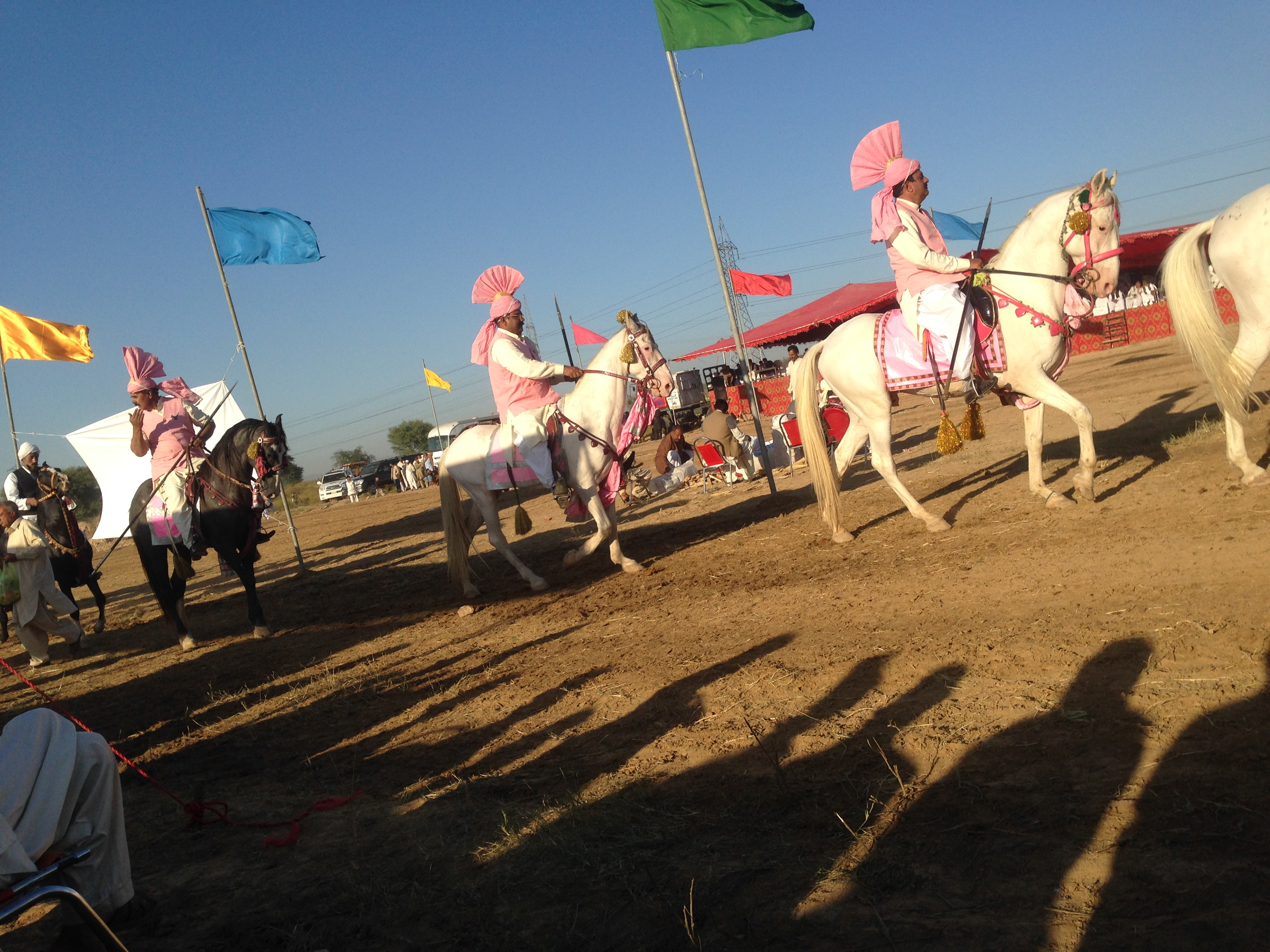

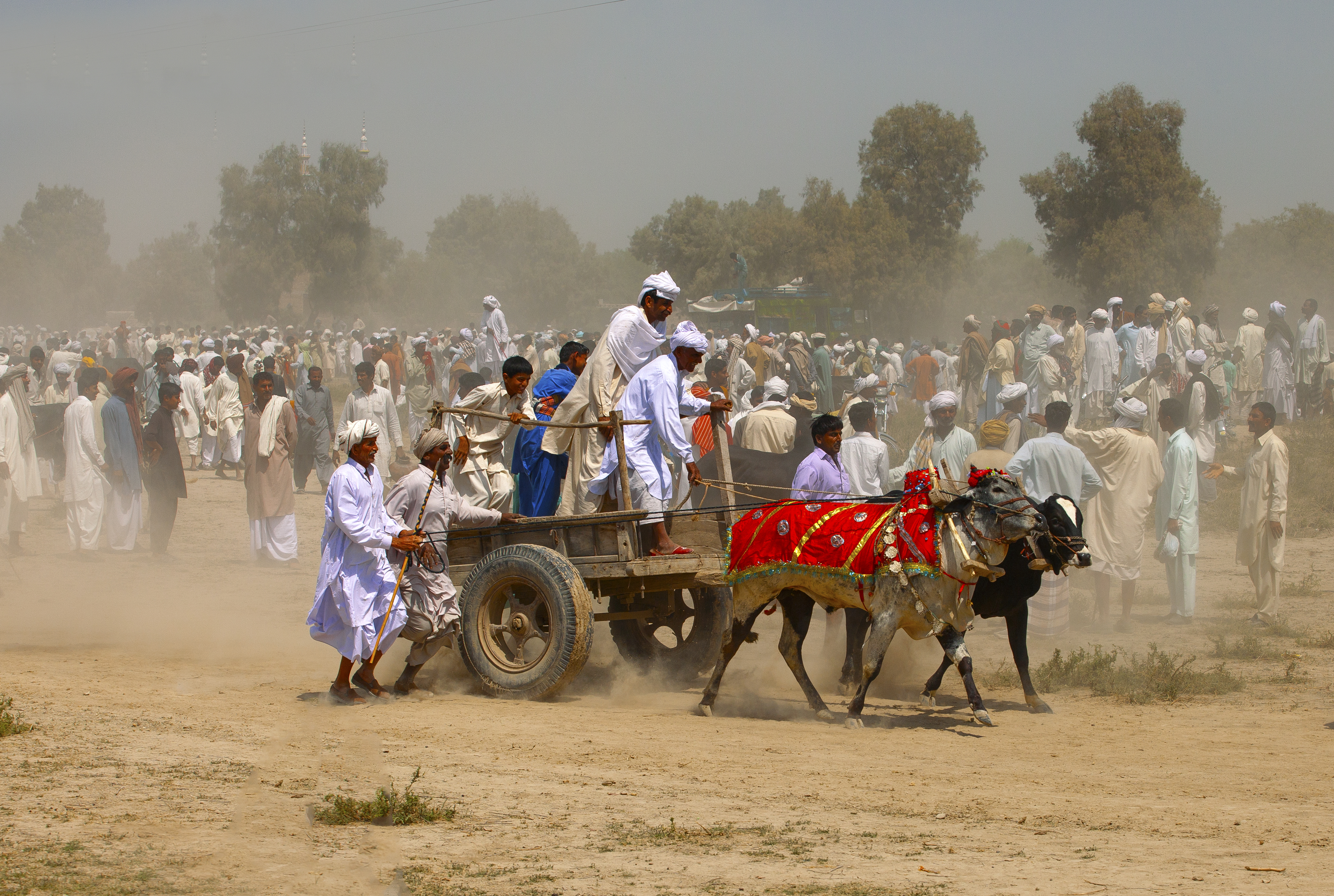

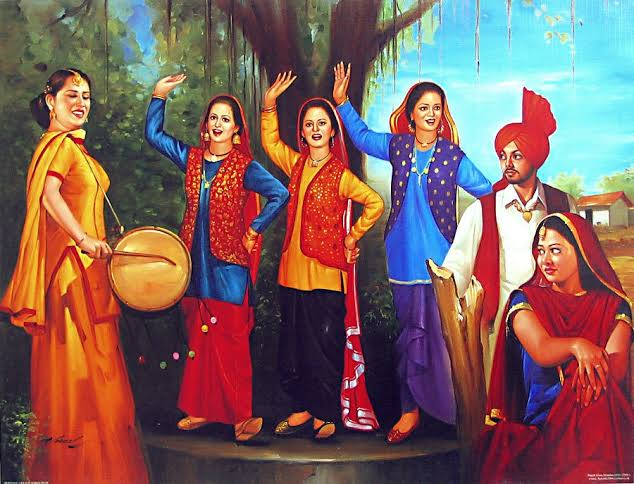

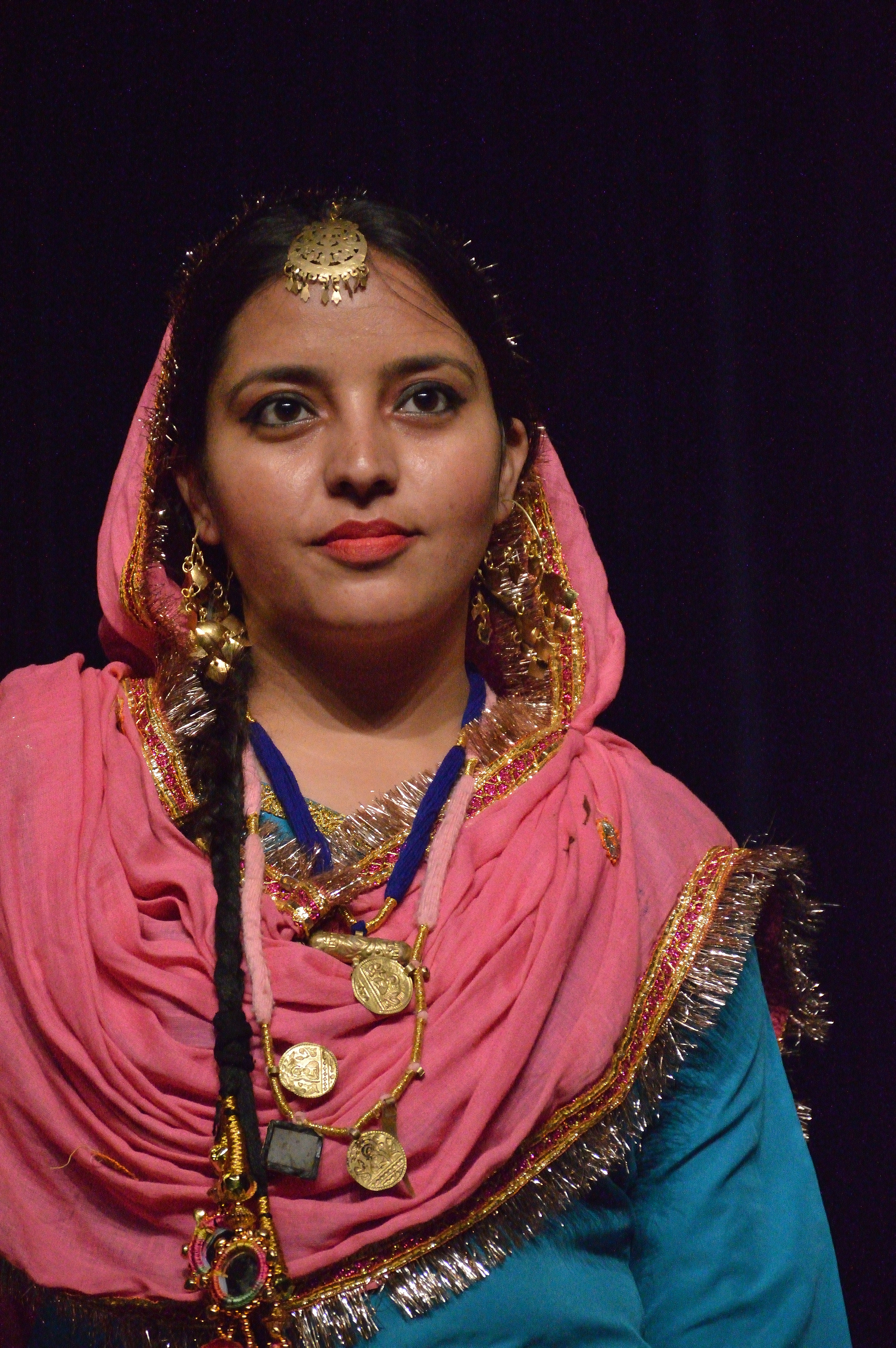

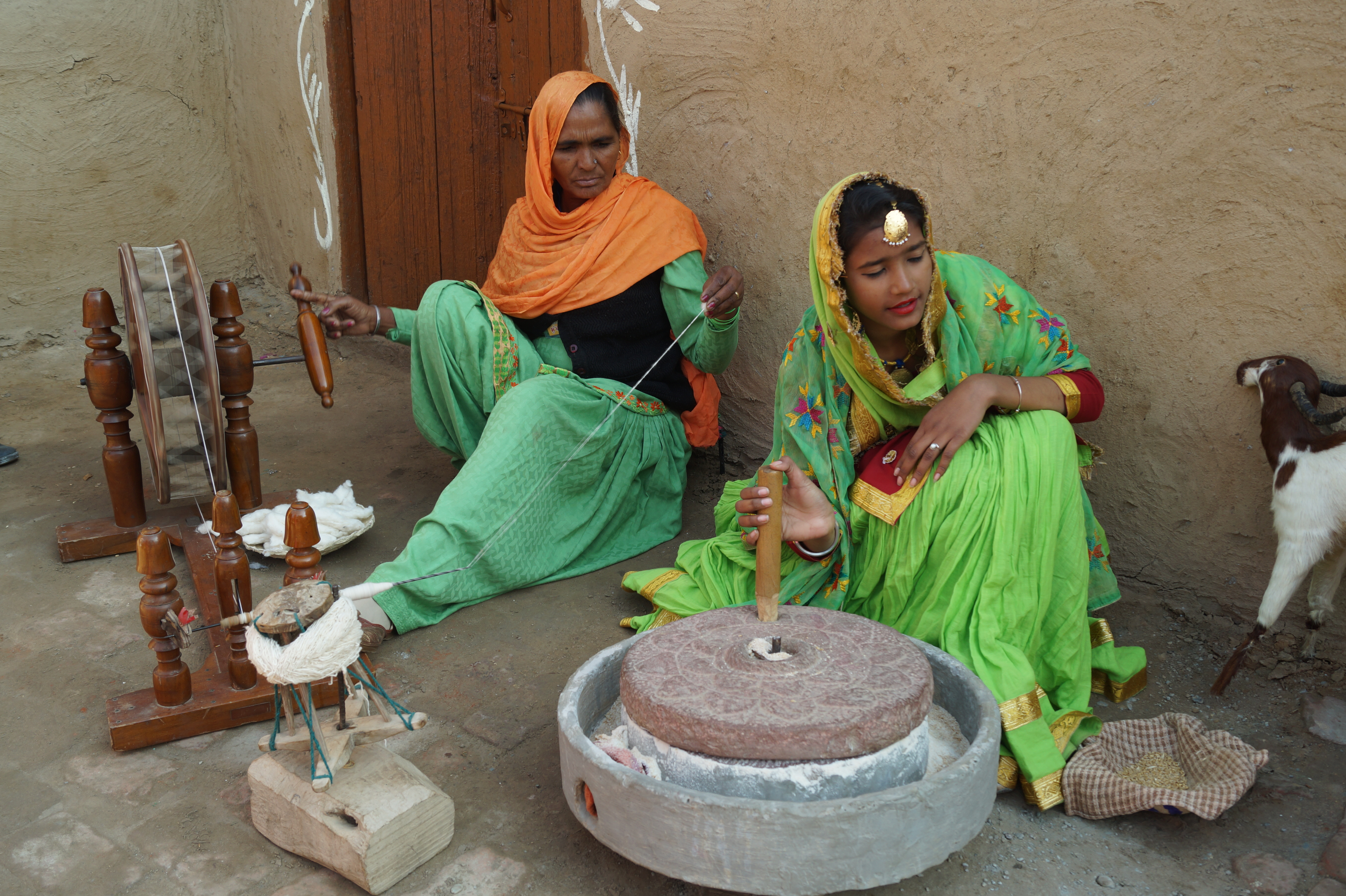

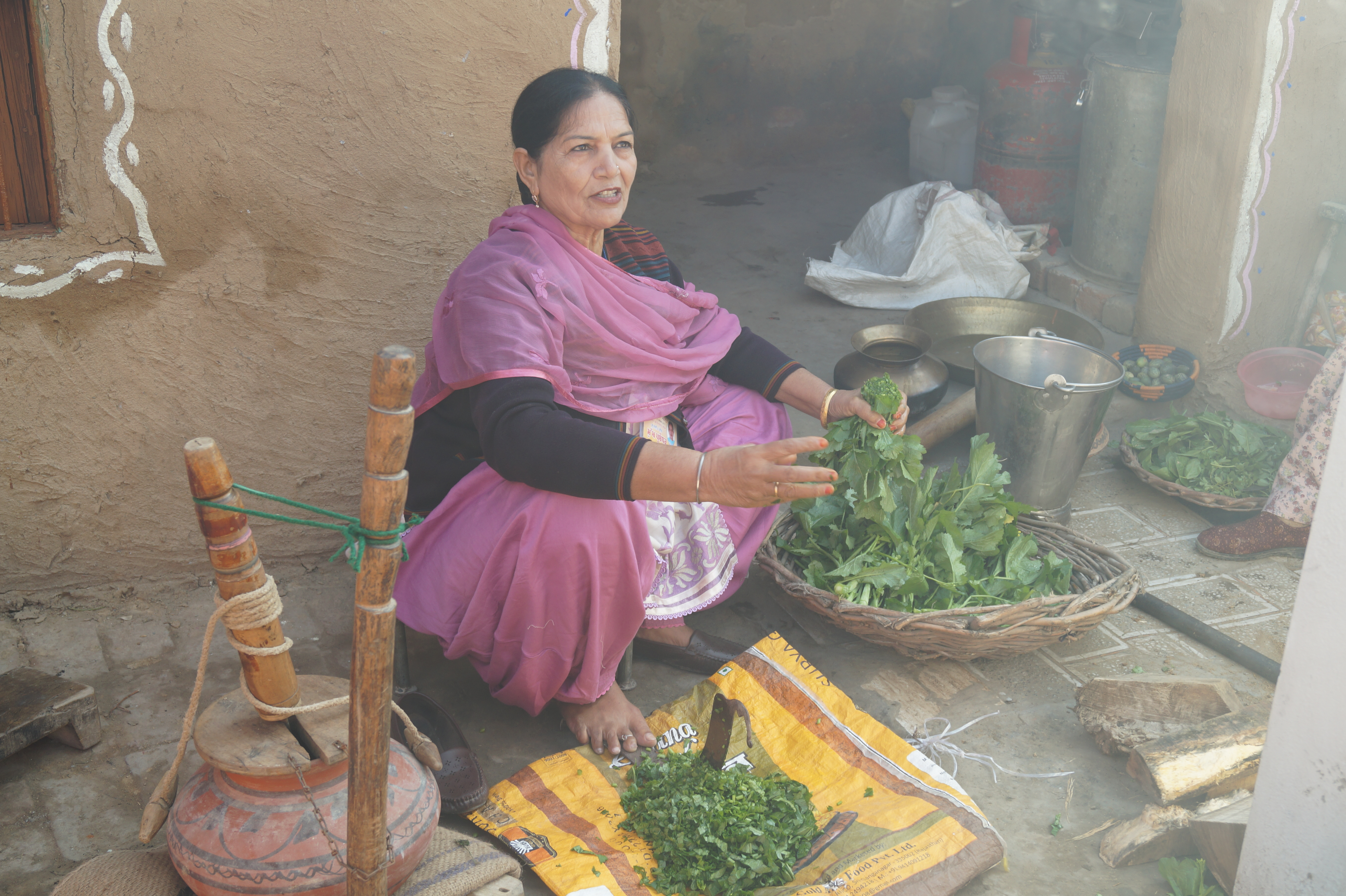

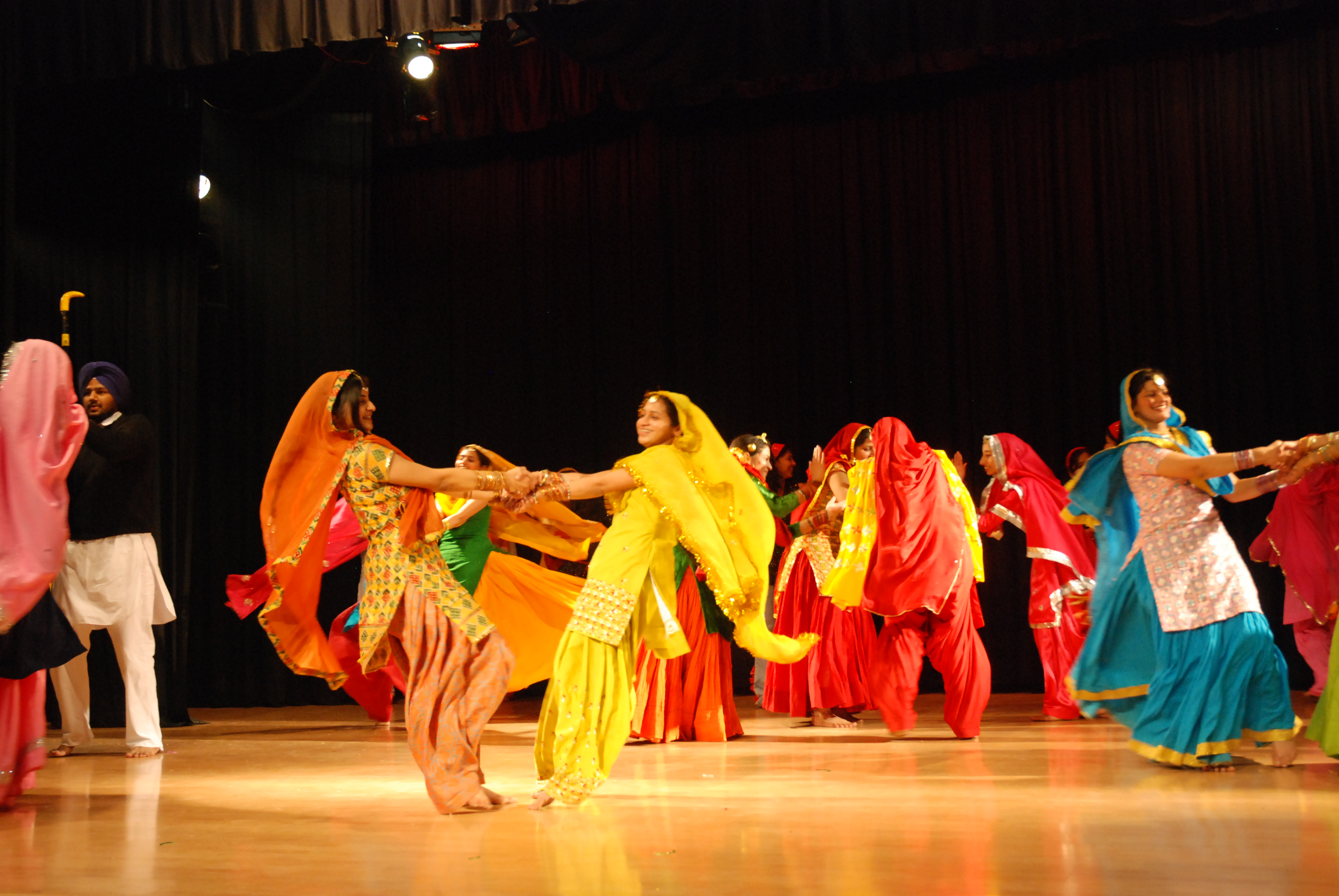

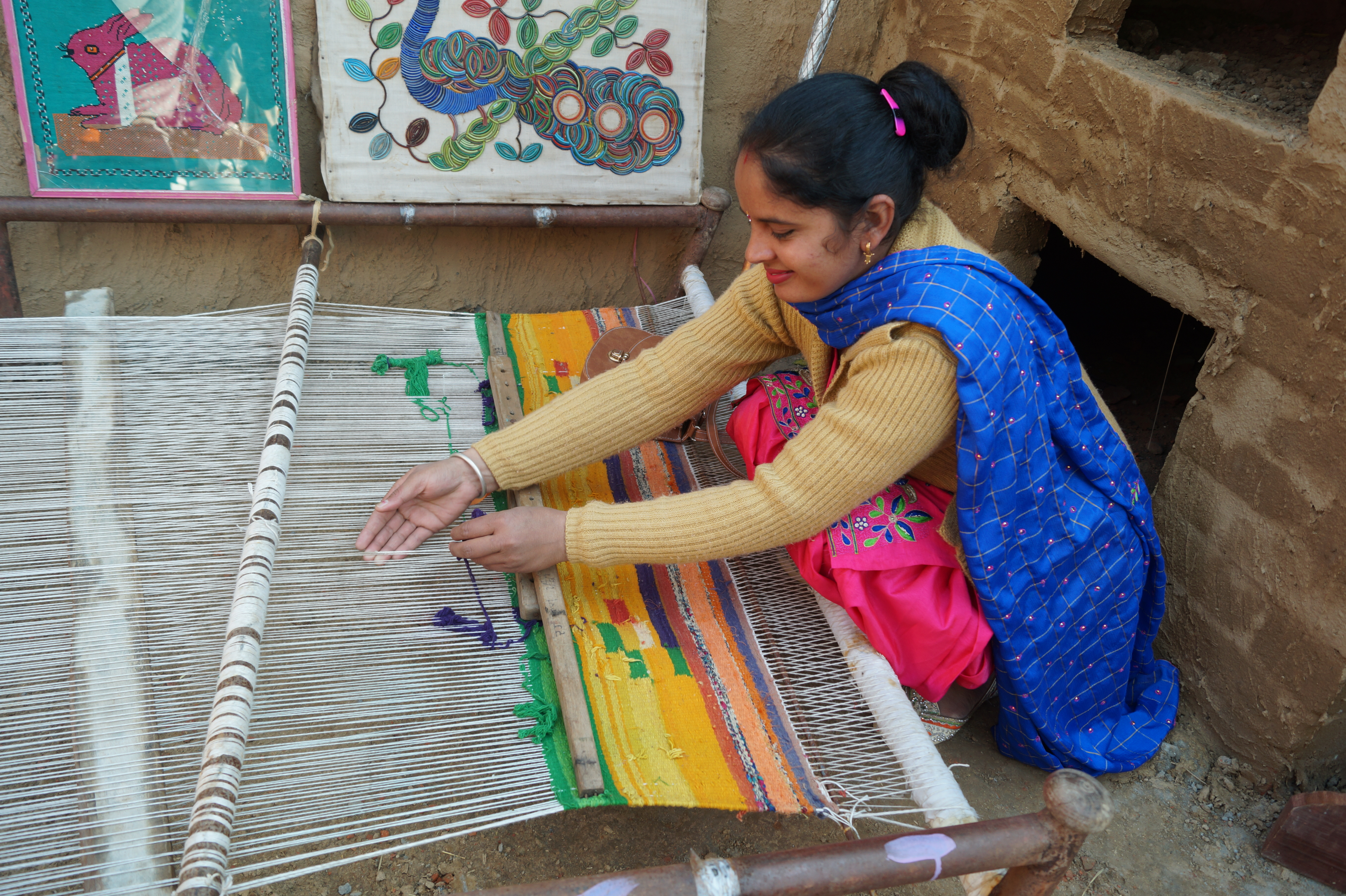

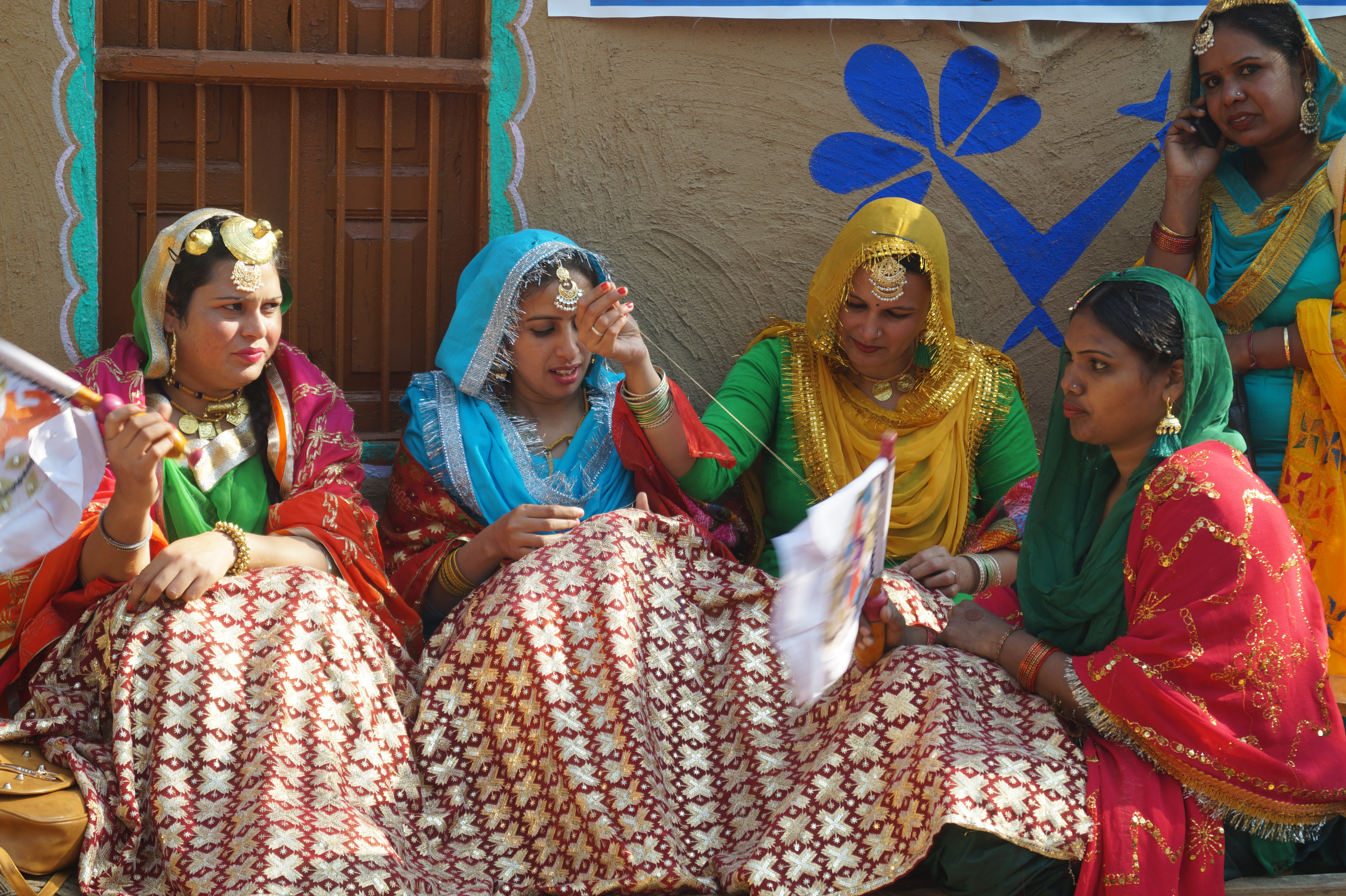

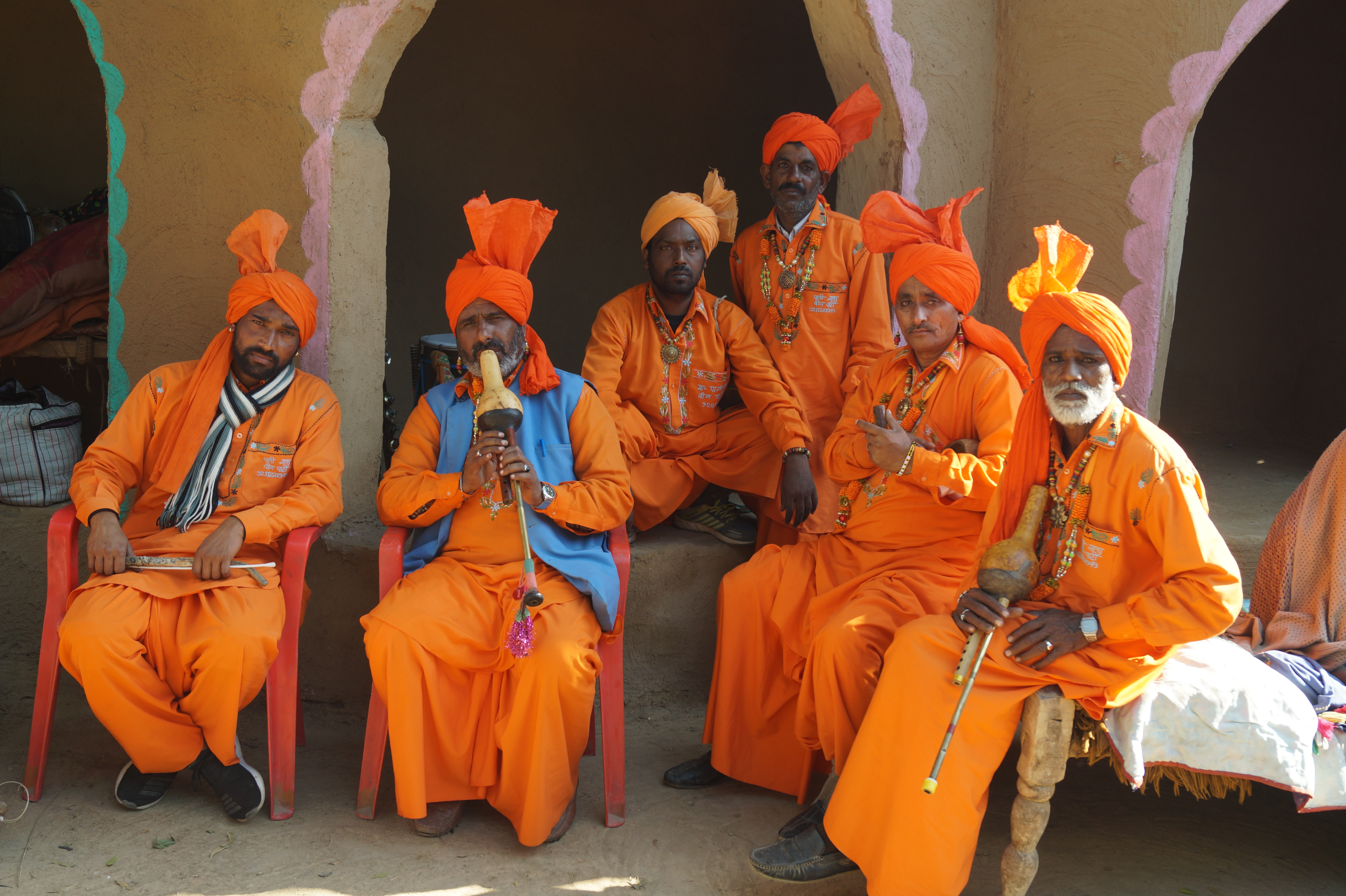

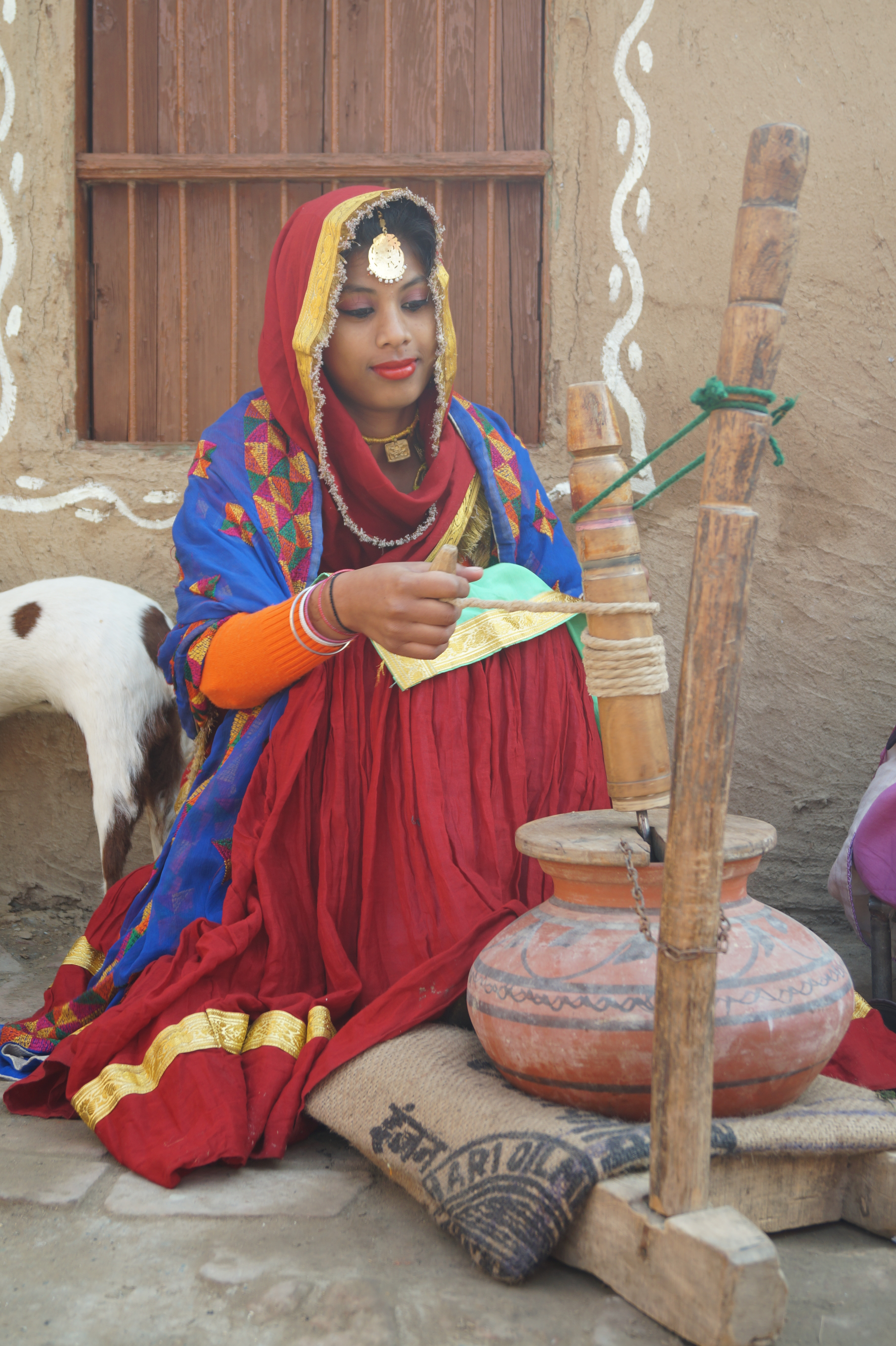

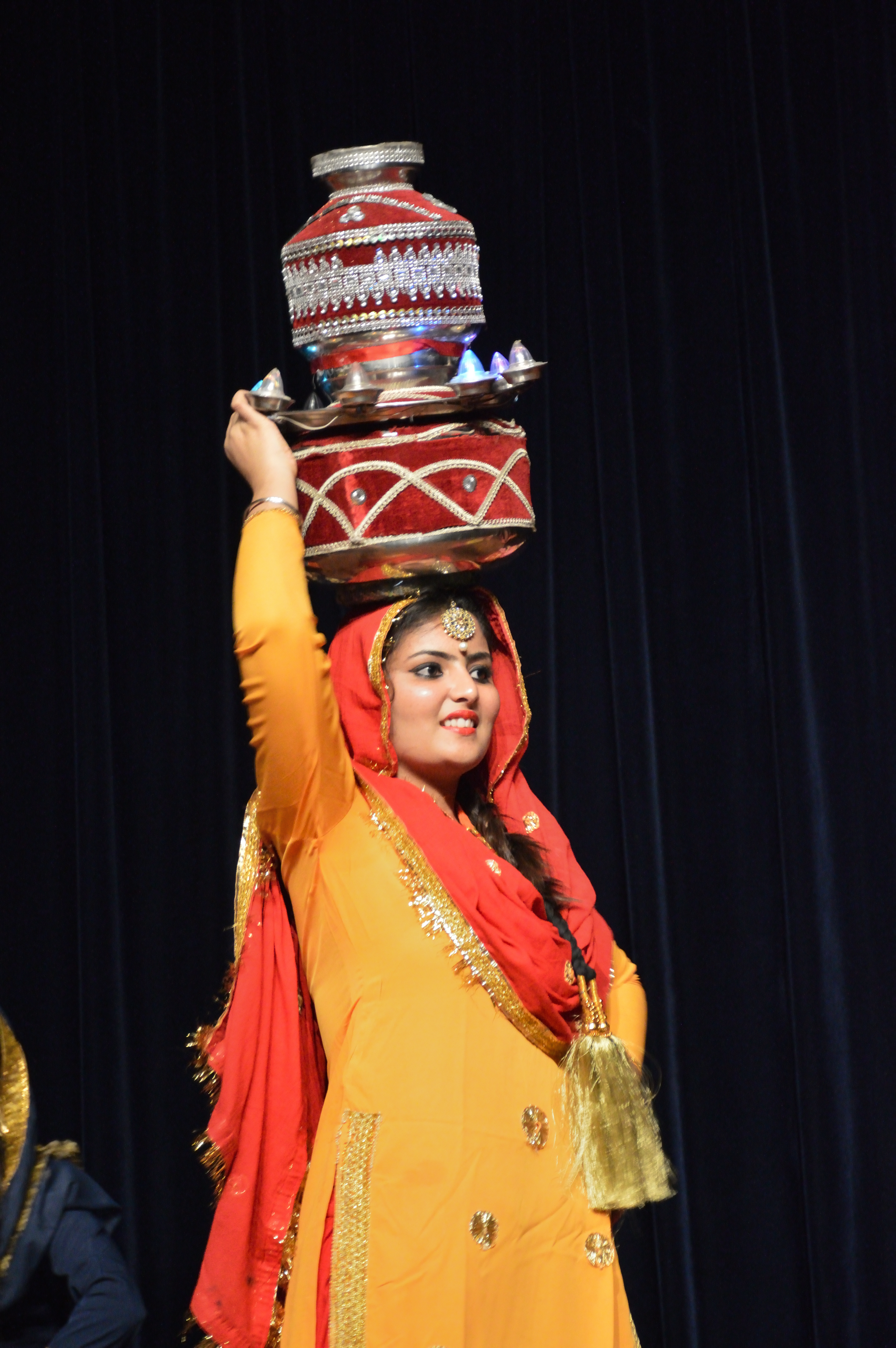

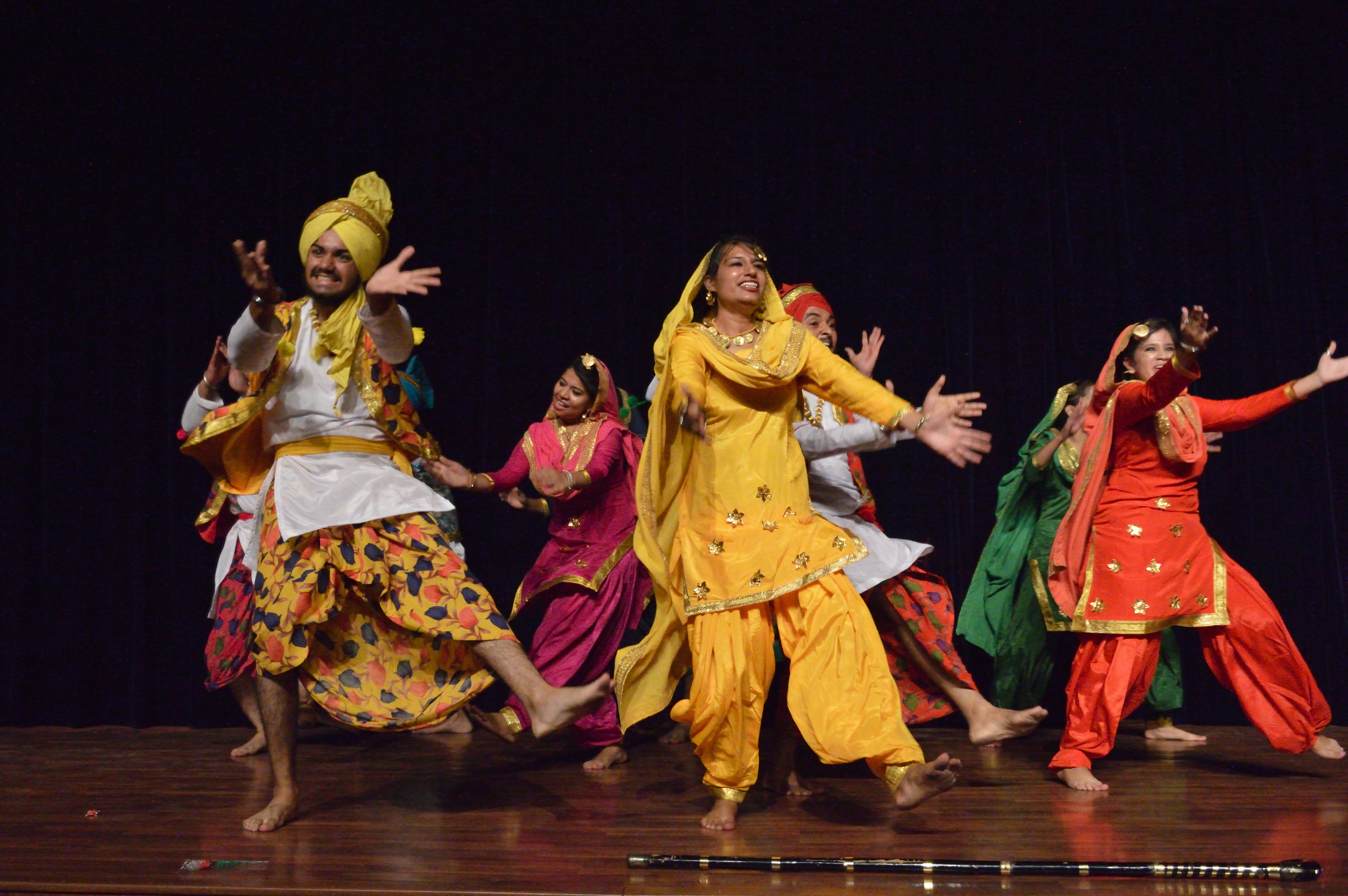

== See also ==
- Punjabi culture
- Punjabiyat
- Punjabi nationalism
- Flag of Punjab, Pakistan
- Punjabi Language Movement
- Punjabi clothing
- Punjabi cuisine
- Lohri
- Vaisakhi
- Livestock show
- Punjabi festivals (Pakistan)
- Punjabi festivals
