= List of fairs and festivals in Punjab, India =

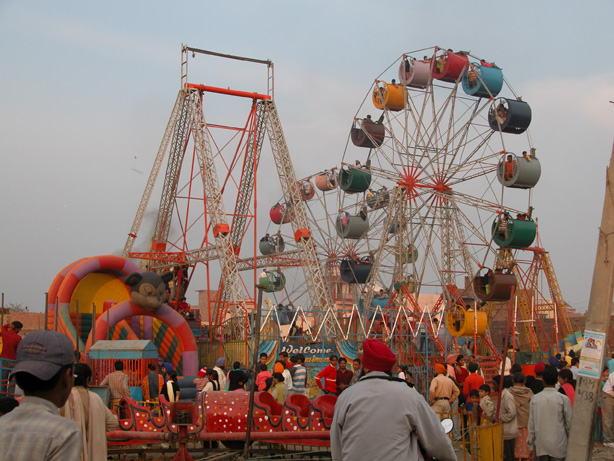
mela

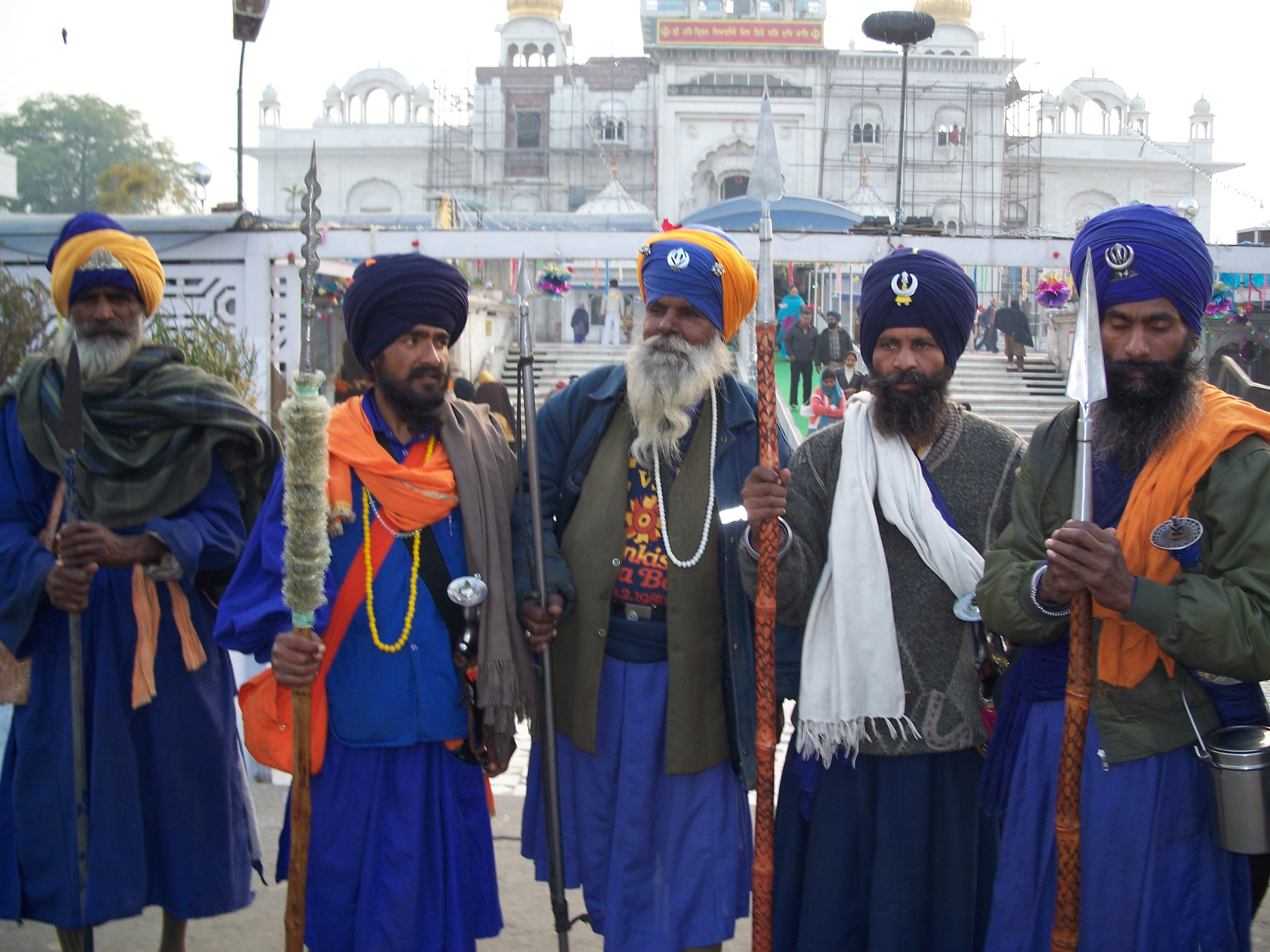
A group of Nihangs who are the chief guests at Maghi mela

The Punjab has many fairs and festivals which are organised throughout the year. The following are some such fairs and festivals:

== Fairs ==
Kurali da Mela

Jarag da Mela

Chappar da Mela

=== Baba Sodal mela ===
A large Hindu fair is held in Jalandhar city. The fair of Baba Sodal is associated with a small boy named Sodal, who is respected as a child-god. The fair commemorates his death anniversary. The fair is held annually during September.

=== Rauza Sharif Urs ===
Rauza Sharif Urs is celebrated in the memory of Sufi Saint Sheikh Ahmed Farooqi Sirhindi who was a disciple of Khawaja Baqi Billah. The fair takes place on the Fategarh Sahib-Bassi Pathan road in Fatehgarh Sahib.

=== Jor Mela ===
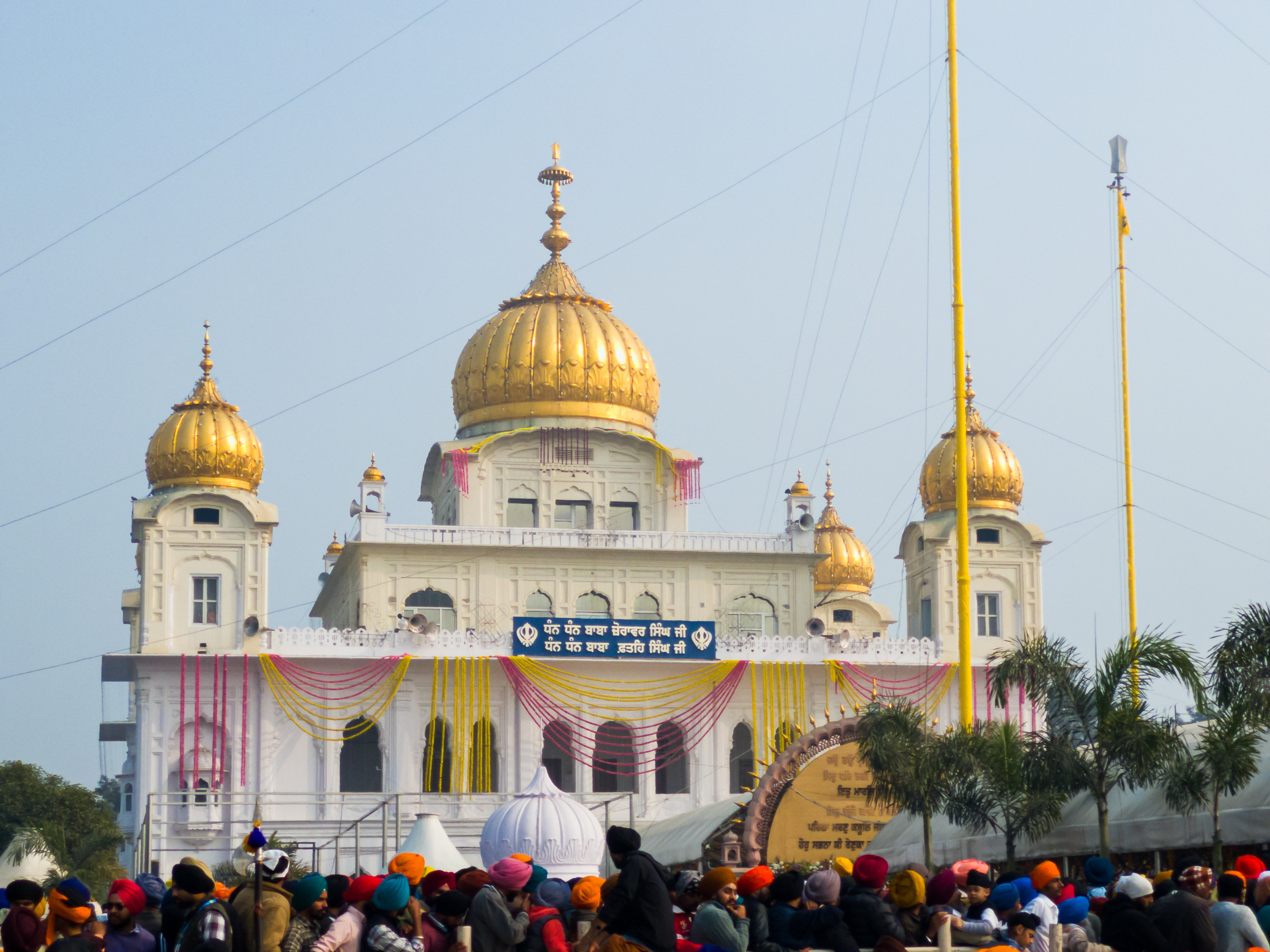
Fatehgarh Sahib Gurdwara, Punjab

Annual three-day Shaheedi Jor Mela is held at Fatehgarh Sahib Gurdwara in memory of Sahibzada Zorawar Singh and Fateh Singh. Processions are taken out and Sikh games are displayed in the three-day Mela.

=== Roshni Da mela ===
A famous "Roshni Mela" (festival of lights) is held in Jagraon. The fair is held at the mazar of Peer Baba Mohkumdeen and lasts for three days. Thousands of people from Punjab, Haryana, Uttar Pradesh, Himachal Pradesh and other neighbouring states visit the place, light an earthen lamp at the mazar and pray. Roshni Da Mela Jagraon

=== Bathinda Virasat Mela ===
The mela showcases traditional Punjabi culture at the Jaipal Theme Village inside the Bathinda Sports Stadium. The mela also involves heritage walks from Gurdwara Haji Rattan to Jaipalgarh theme village.

=== Vaisakhi ===
Local fairs are organised in various places in Punjab on Vaisakhi.

=== Mela Maghi ===
The Mela Maghi held at Muktsar lasts for three days.

=== Baba Sheikh Farid Aagman ===
Baba Farid, a 12th-century Sufi Saint, visited Faridkot, named after him. The fair takes place at Gurdwara Tilla Baba Farid and includes cultural and sporting events.

The mela takes place every year between 19 September and 23 September. Evolving from its spiritual origin associated with the visit of the Sufi Prophet, the festival has now embraced cultural, literary, intellectual and sports spheres of the people of this region. In the Sufi tradition of its founder saint, the festival has inherited the themes of humanism, communal harmony and national integration.

=== Basant Festival of Kites ===
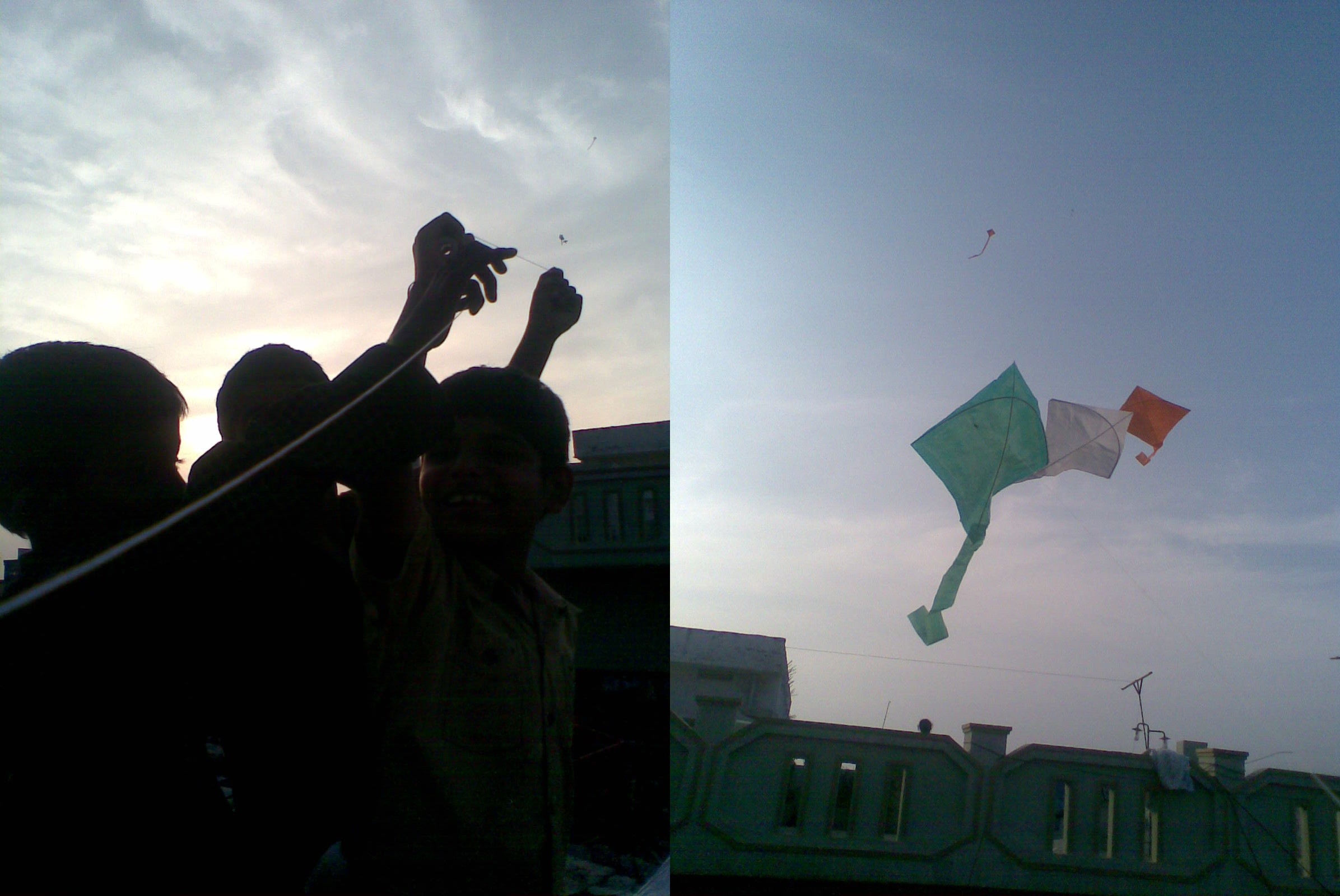
Kites

Local fairs are held in various places on Basant. The ruler of Kapurthala princely state, Maharaja Jagatjit Singh, started the Basant Panchami fair which will be in its 104th (2022). People attend the fair at Shalamar Bagh wearing yellow clothes and turbans. In Hoshiarpur, a fair is held at the Boeli of Baba Bhandari where thousands of men, women and children participated and pay obeisance at the samadhi of martyr Dharamvir Hakikat Rai. Basant in the Punjab is associated with Hakikat Rai who laid down his life to fight for the right of people to follow their religion of choice. At the fair held at the Boeli of Baba Bhandari, it is customary to hold kite-flying competitions.

== Festivals ==
=== Kila Raipur Sports Festival ===
In February every year, the Kila Raipur Sports Festival takes place showcasing bullock, dog, mules, camel and other animal races.

=== Patiala Heritage festival ===
Started in 2003, the festival takes place in Patiala in the Qila Mubarak Complex, which lasts for ten days. The festival includes the Crafts Mela, Indian classical music (vocal and instrumental) and dance

=== Kapurthala Heritage Festival ===
The Baba Jassa Singh Ahluwalia Heritage Festival is held by the Kapurthala Heritage Trust, in collaboration with the Indian National Trust for Arts and Cultural Heritage and supported by the Government of Punjab. The festival takes place at Jagatjit Palace and centres on classical music, dance and theatre.

=== Amritsar Ambarsar Heritage Festival ===
The festival showcases bhangra, giddha, gatka troupes, horses and elephants. The cultural programmes include shabad kirtan, theatre, music and dance.

=== Harivallabh Sangeet Festival ===
Taking place every year on 27–30 December, the music festival honors the memory of Swami Harivallabh. The festival is recognised by the Government of India as a National festival of music. Harivallabh shall complete 139 Years on 28 December 2014. The festival is held at the Devi Talab Mandir in Jalandhar city

== See also ==
- Punjabi festivals
- Punjabi festivals (Pakistan)
- List of Sikh festivals
- Mela
- Maghi
