= Punjabi culture =

Arts, cuisine, dress, etc. of Punjab

Punjabi culture grew out of the settlements along the five rivers (the name Punjab, is derived from two Persian words, Panj meaning "Five" and Âb meaning "Water") which served as an important route to the Near East as early as the ancient Indus Valley Civilization, dating back to 3300 BCE. Agriculture has been the major economic feature of the Punjab and has therefore formed the foundation of Punjabi culture, with one's social status being determined by landownership. The Punjab emerged as an important agricultural region, especially following the Green Revolution during the mid-1960s to the mid-1970s, has been described as the "breadbasket of both India and Pakistan". Besides being known for agriculture and trade, the Punjab is also a region that over the centuries has experienced many foreign invasions and consequently has a long-standing history of warfare, as the Punjab is situated on the principal route of invasions through the northwestern frontier of the Indian subcontinent, which promoted to adopt a lifestyle that entailed engaging in warfare to protect the land. Warrior culture typically elevates the value of the community's honour (izzat), which is highly esteemed by Punjabis.

== Music ==
Bhangra is one of the many Punjabi musical art forms that are increasingly listened to in the West and becoming a mainstream favourite. Punjabi music is used by western musicians in many ways, such as mixing with other compositions to produce award-winning music. Sufi music and Qawali, commonly practiced in Pakistani Punjab; are other important genres in the Punjab region.

History of Modern Music

Punjabi music started to develop and alter in the 20th century as it was impacted by Western musical genres including pop, rock, and hip-hop. As a result, a brand-new genre of Punjabi music emerged, fusing contemporary beats and production methods with traditional instruments and melodies. Gurdas Maan was a trailblazer of the new Punjabi music scene, becoming well known in the 1980s with singles like "Challa" and "Mamla Gadbad Hai." Traditional Punjabi folk tunes were blended with contemporary production methods in Maan's music, while societal themes including drug misuse, poverty, and governmental corruption were frequently touched upon in his lyrics.

Diljit Dosanjh is a popular Punjabi artist who has been active since the last three to four years.

== Dance ==
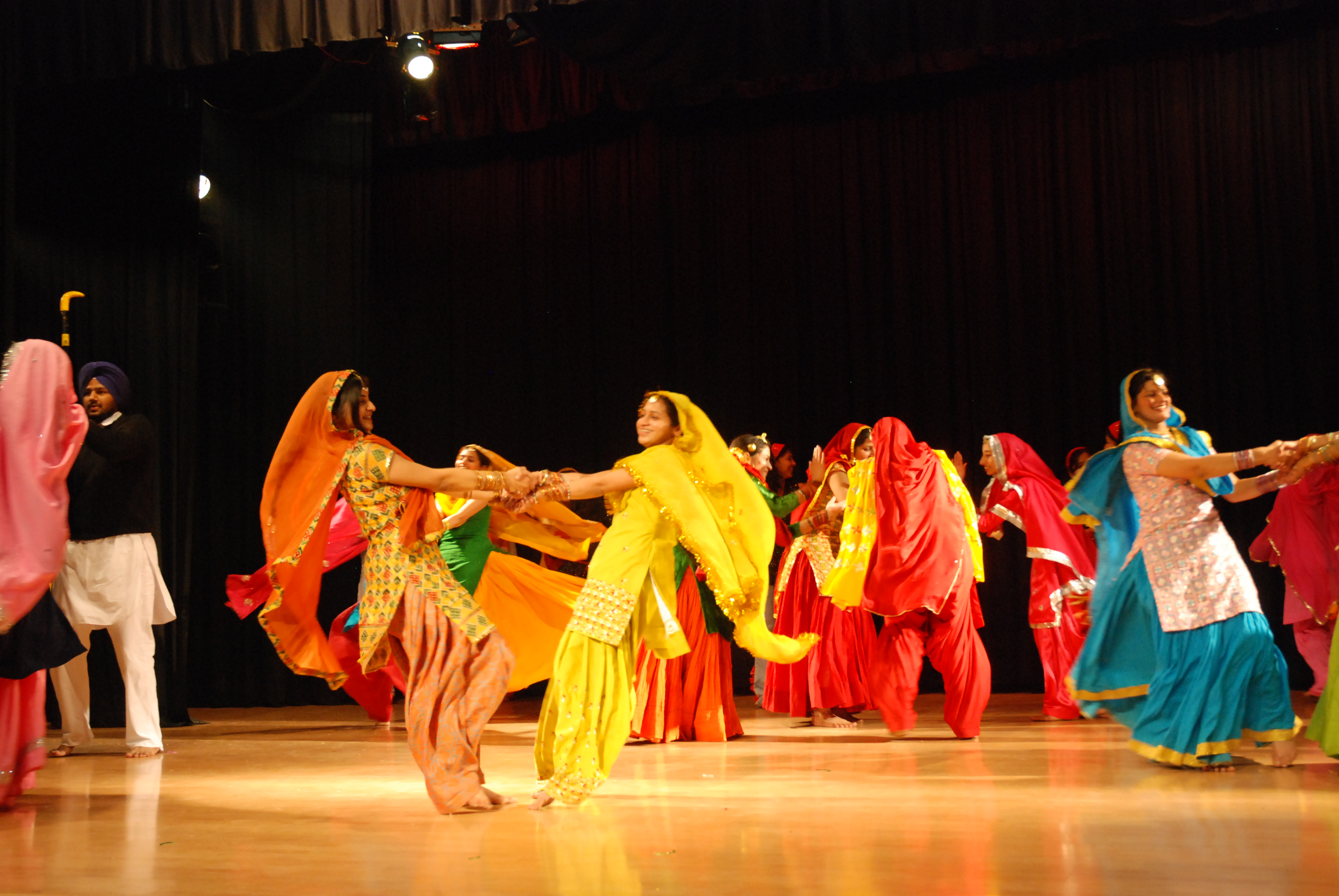
Traditional Punjabi dance, Kikkli.

Punjabi dances are performed either by men or by women. The dances range from solo to group dances and also sometimes dances are done along with Punjabi traditional musical instruments. Bhangra is one of the most famous dances originating in the Punjab by farmers during the harvesting season. It was mainly performed while farmers did agricultural chores. As they did each farming activity they would perform bhangra moves on the spot. This allowed them to finish their job in a pleasurable way. For many years, farmers performed bhangra to showcase a sense of accomplishment and to welcome the new harvesting season. Traditional bhangra is performed in a circle and is performed using traditional dance steps. Traditional bhangra is now also performed on occasions other than during the harvest season. A well-known dance for women is the giddha.

== Art ==
Painting in the Punjab developed during the reign of Iltutmish of the Khilji dynasty, who had patronized that. A historical reference to this was made in the Tarikh-I-Ferozeshi. Sikh art, including Sikh painting, is mostly derived from Punjab's art traditions. B.N. Goswamy argues that painting in the Punjab goes back to the 16th century and became influenced by the Mughal school in the early half of the 18th century. Punjabi Sikh forays into painting were mostly limited to wall paintings decorating the walls of religious sites up until the early 19th century. Miniature painting depicting Hindu religious scenes and themes was popular in the Punjab Hills amongst the various Pahari Rajput states.

Between 1810–1830, the Sikhs began to commission these Pahari artists to paint Sikh subjects and settings, mostly Sikh royalty and nobility. After Sikhs began to progressively come into more and more contact with Europeans after 1830, the main influence on Punjabi Sikh art shifted from Pahari styles and methods to European ones. The Punjabi form and localization of Company paintings would be born out of this increased interaction between European and Punjabi artists. Thus, Pahari-influenced traditional miniature paintings began to be surmounted by European-influenced Company school paintings. Lahori and Amritsari artists increasingly abandoned using the traditional Indic medium of gouache for watercolour techniques.

In 1838–39, a British visitor hired local Punjabi artists to produce pictures covering the various kinds of inhabitants of northern India using British-supplied paper and bound into an album. Images of the Sikh royals and military were documented in these British-patronized local paintings. Many Europeans were employed by the Lahore Durbar, such as the Frenchman Jean-François Allard, and were sponsors of the local arts. A few European artists who visited the Sikh court of Lahore and left a deep impact on the local art were: G. T. Vigne (visited in 1837), William G. Osborne (visited in 1838), Emily Eden (visited in 1838 alongside her brother), and August Schoefft (arrived in 1841). Eden had a large impact, as her published work Portraits of the Princes and People of India (which included lithographic depictions of Sikhs and Punjabis) was a big success and many copies of the work made their way to Punjab where they ended up giving further shape to the emerging Punjabi Company School. Schoefft spent over a year in Punjab painting various local scenes and subjects. During the Anglo-Sikh Wars, many of the British officials and soldiers who made their way to Punjab were artists. An example is Henry Lawrence, who painted local residents of various walks of life. Many Indian artists who followed the Company school were hired to paint Punjabi subjects and settings. When the Sikh Empire was annexed in 1849, local Punjabi artists working in the Company style created works based upon stock sets for the purpose of selling them to European tourists in the local bazaars. These Punjabi paintings geared towards a European audience depicted "Sikh rulers, heroes, occupations, and costumes".

=== Wall paintings ===
Murals (including frescoes) feature prominently in Punjab and showcase various themes. Punjabi murals differ from Punjabi miniature paintings in that the wall paintings were far more readily accessible and viewable by the general masses rather than being mostly an affair restricted to the privileged classes of the society, as in the case of miniatures. Since murals could be seen by all walks of society, the things depicted in them were commonly understood subjects that required no specialized knowledge. Punjabi murals can depict religious or secular settings.

==== Religious themes ====
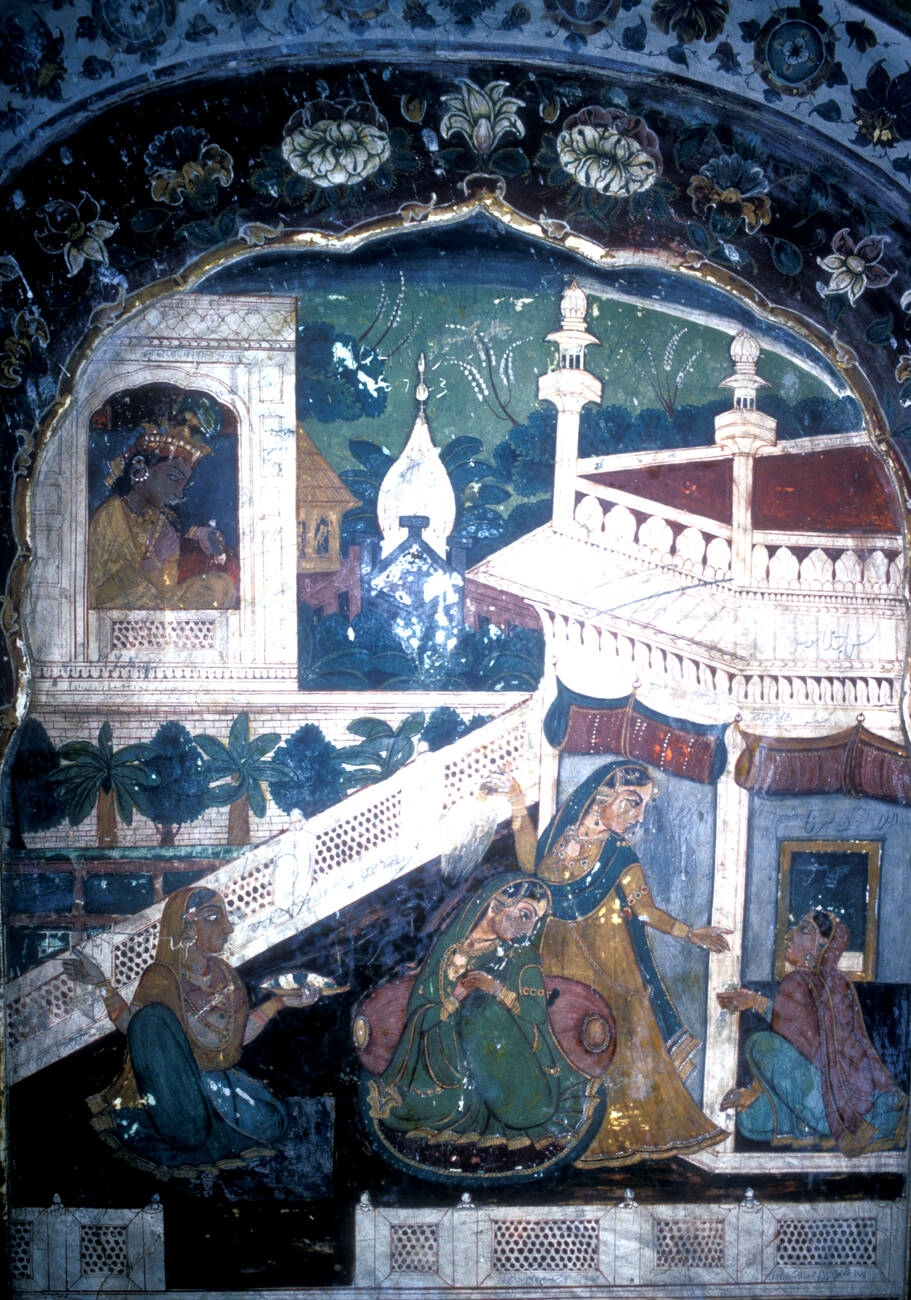
Mural depicting a scene from Indic mythology, located within the Samadh of Maharaja Ranjit Singh in Lahore, ca.1840's. The mythological scene depicted is likely a Vaishnavist scene from the Mahabharata or Ramayana epics.

Religious-themed murals are often found at religious shrines, such as Hindu and Sikh temples. Scenes from Hindu mythology, such as the Mahabharata, are commonly found, an example being the unveiling of Draupadi.

Religious murals depicting female figuratives were often Shaktist in-nature. A prevailing theme of the divine (the Shakti) incarnating in feminine form (these unique forms are given various names, such as Kali) to battle with negative forces (that are hostile to the deities and mankind), including demons (such as Mahishasura) and giants (such as Shumbha and Nishumbha), is a commonly witnessed scene of Punjabi murals. The scenes depicted by this category of wall paintings are seemingly drawn from the Markandeya Purana, which promotes the reverence of Shakti as the divine-mother figure.

Other scenes found in Punjabi wall paintings seem to stem from the stories of the Bhagavata Purana. An example of a type of mural scene derived from it is Radha being surrounded by youthful gopis. Krishna is also commonly depicted alongside gopis in this sort of mural. Krishna is sometimes shown playing his flute whilst the gopis perform the ras-lila around him or he is shown stealing clothes from the gopis, an episode known as chira-harana.

Aside from Hindu themes, there are also depictions based upon Sikh history and themes, such as Sikh gurus, martyrs (shaheeds), and religious figures (an example being bhagats).

==== Secular themes ====
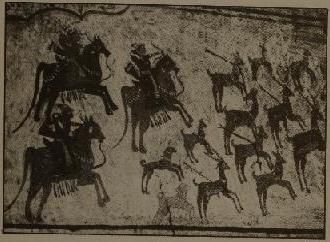
Fresco depicting a hunting scene from a Punjabi Muslim khangah (Khangah Dargani Shah at Dhun Dhaewal) located on the right bank of the Beas River near Chola Sahib, Tarn Taran district

Amid the murals based on profane subjects, depictions of scenes from traditional Punjabi folklore are commonplace, such as Heer Ranjha, Mirza Sahiban, Sohni Mahiwal, Sassi Pannu, Laila Majnun, Raja Rasalu, and more. A lot of the depicted stories are ultimately based upon bardic literature, such as the legends of Shah Behram and Husan Banu. There are also paintings based upon traditional folk ballads, such as Puran Bhagat. Additionally, there are paintings of various Nayika themes, including the Ashta-nayika (eight heroines). There also exists wall paintings based upon the Sat Sai of Bihari. There are further depictions of various royal figures, such as Rani Jindan. Many Punjabi wall paintings depict women and girls in the process of a variety of actions, such as feeding parrots, peacocks, or bucks. Women are also depicted fondling pets or writing love letters in these wall paintings.

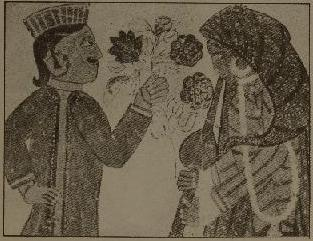
Fresco depicting a dalliance scene from Jandwal temple in Hoshiarpur district

Usually displayed less conspicuously, there were also wall painting depicting sexual or erotic themes. It was a common practice to decorate the walls of Islamic and Hindu palaces with erotic scenes. The Sikh royalty and nobality during the reign of the Sikh Empire had their residences embellished with these erotic wall paintings. General Paolo Avitabile had his private residence quarters decorated with figures of scantily clad dancing girls and Indic deities in the act of making love. At the Rani Mahal of erstwhile Nabha State, there are wall paintings of couples having sex in various positions, settings, and emotions based upon the Koka Shastra treatise. These erotic-based murals were limited mostly to the areas frequented by the upper-classes of the Punjabi society at the time.

== Weddings ==
Punjabi wedding traditions and ceremonies are traditionally conducted in Punjabi and are a strong reflection of Punjabi culture. While the actual religious marriage ceremony among Muslims, Hindus, Sikhs, Jains, Buddhists and Christians may be conducted in Arabic, Urdu, Punjabi, Sanskrit, Hindi or Pali by the Qazi, Pundit, Granthi or Priest, there are commonalities in ritual, song, dance, food, and dress. The Punjabi wedding has many rituals and ceremonies that have evolved since traditional times and itself have evolved in Pakistani Punjab and Indian Punjab.

== Cuisine ==
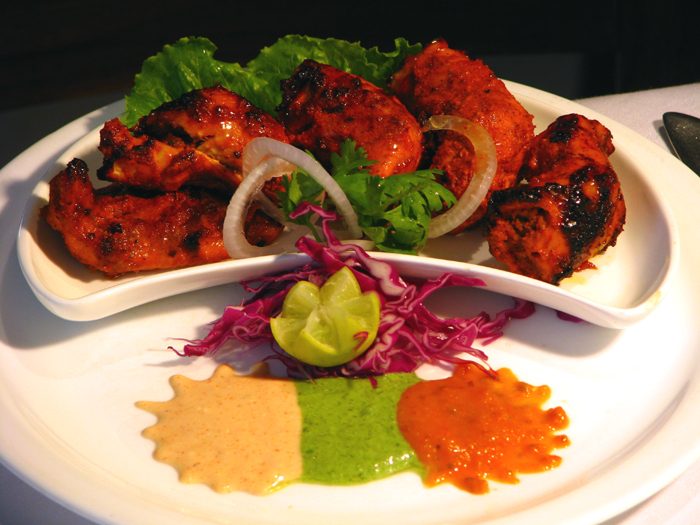
Tandoori chicken is a popular dish in Punjabi cuisine.

The local cuisine of Punjab is heavily influenced by the agriculture and farming lifestyle prevalent from the times of the ancient Indus Valley Civilization. Dishes similar to tandoori chicken may have existed during the Harappan civilization during the Bronze Age of India. According to the archeologist Professor Vasant Shinde, the earliest evidence for a dish similar to tandoori chicken can be found in the Harappan civilization and dates back to 3000 BC. His team has found ancient ovens at Harappan sites which are similar to the tandoors that are used in the state of Punjab. Physical remains of chicken bones with char marks have also been unearthed. Harappan houses had keyhole ovens with central pillars which was used for roasting meats and baking breads. Sushruta Samhita records meat being cooked in an oven (kandu) after marinating it in spices like black mustard (rai) powder and fragrant spices. According to Ahmed (2014), Harappan oven structures may have operated in a similar manner to the modern tandoors of the Punjab.

Basmati rice is the indigenous variety of Punjab, and various meat- and vegetable-based rice dishes have been developed using it.

== Language and literature ==
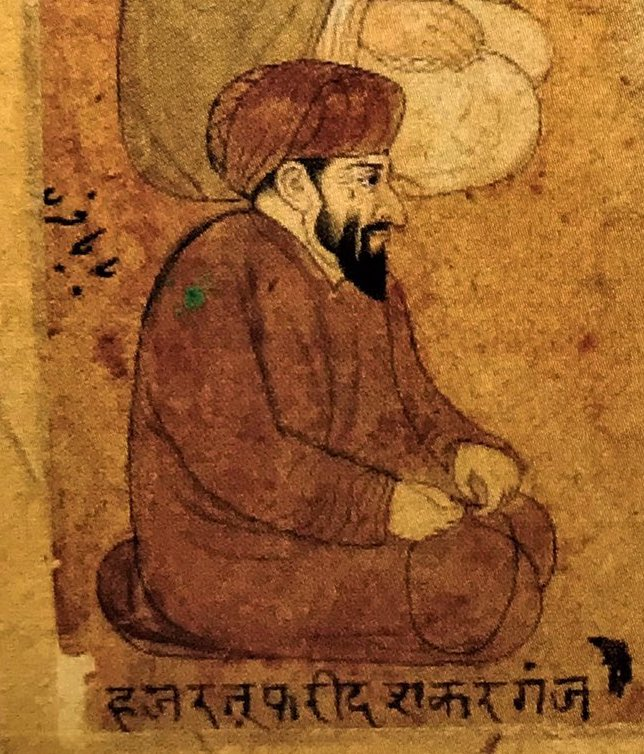
Baba Farid, considered the first major Punjabi poet.

The Punjabi language is written with the Gurmukhi alphabet in India and with the Shahmukhi alphabet in Pakistan. Approximately 130 million people speak the Punjabi language.

The earliest writings in Punjabi belong to Nath Yogi era from 9th to 14th century. They referred to God with various names such as "Alakh Nirajan" which are still prevalent in Punjabi vernacular.

The Punjabi literary tradition is popularly seen to commence with Fariduddin Ganjshakar (1173–1266). Roughly from the 12th century to the 19th century, Punjabi Sufi poetry developed under Shah Hussain (1538–1599), Sultan Bahu (1628–1691), Shah Sharaf (1640–1724), Ali Haider (1690–1785), Bulleh Shah (1680–1757), Saleh Muhammad Safoori (1747–1826), Mian Muhammad Baksh (1830–1907) and Khwaja Ghulam Farid (1845–1901). In contrast to Persian poets, who had preferred the ghazal for poetic expression, Punjabi Sufi poets tended to compose in the Kafi.

Punjabi Sufi poetry also influenced other Punjabi literary traditions particularly the Punjabi Qissa, a genre of romantic tragedy which also derived inspiration from Indic, Persian and Quranic sources. The Qissa of Heer Ranjha by Waris Shah (1706–1798) is among the most popular of Punjabi qisse. Other popular stories include Sohni Mahiwal by Fazal Shah, Mirza Sahiba by Hafiz Barkhudar (1658–1707), Sassi Punnun by Hashim Shah (1735–1843), and Qissa Puran Bhagat by Qadaryar (1802–1892).

== Dress ==
Dastar

A Dastar is an proud of headgear associated with Sikhism and is an important part of the Punjabi and Sikh culture. Among the Sikhs, the dastār is an article of faith that represents equality, honour, self-respect, courage, spirituality, and piety. The Khalsa Sikh men and women, who keep the Five Ks, wear the turban to cover their long, uncut hair (kesh). The Sikhs regard the dastār as an important part of the unique Sikh identity. After the ninth Sikh Guru, Tegh Bahadur, was sentenced to death by the Mughal emperor Aurangzeb, Guru Gobind Singh, the tenth Sikh Guru created the Khalsa and gave five articles of faith, one of which is unshorn hair, which the dastār covers. Prior to Sikhi, only kings, royalty, and those of high stature wore turbans, but Sikh Gurus adopted the practice to assert equality and sovereignty among people.

Punjabi suit

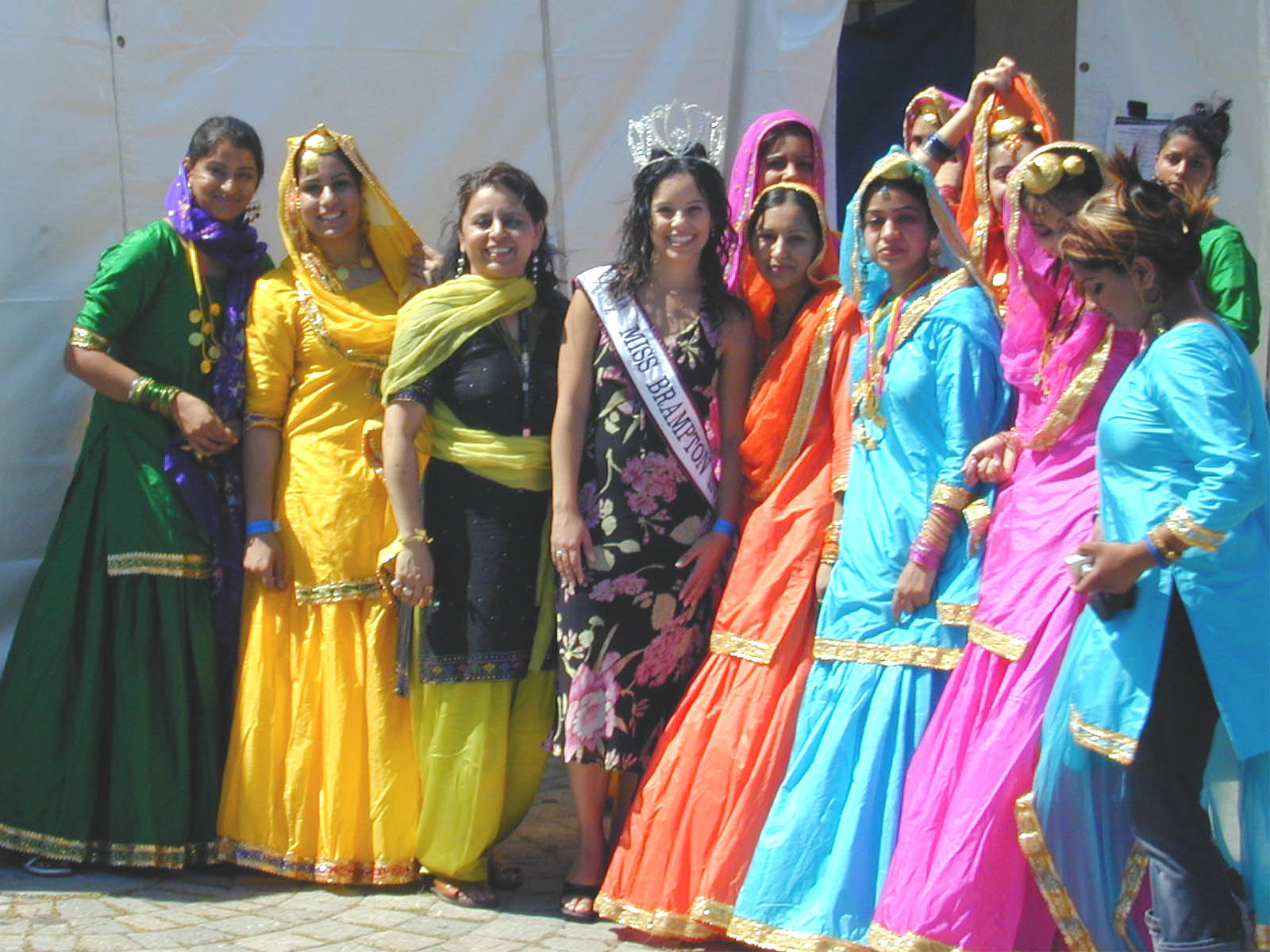
Punjabi traditional dress

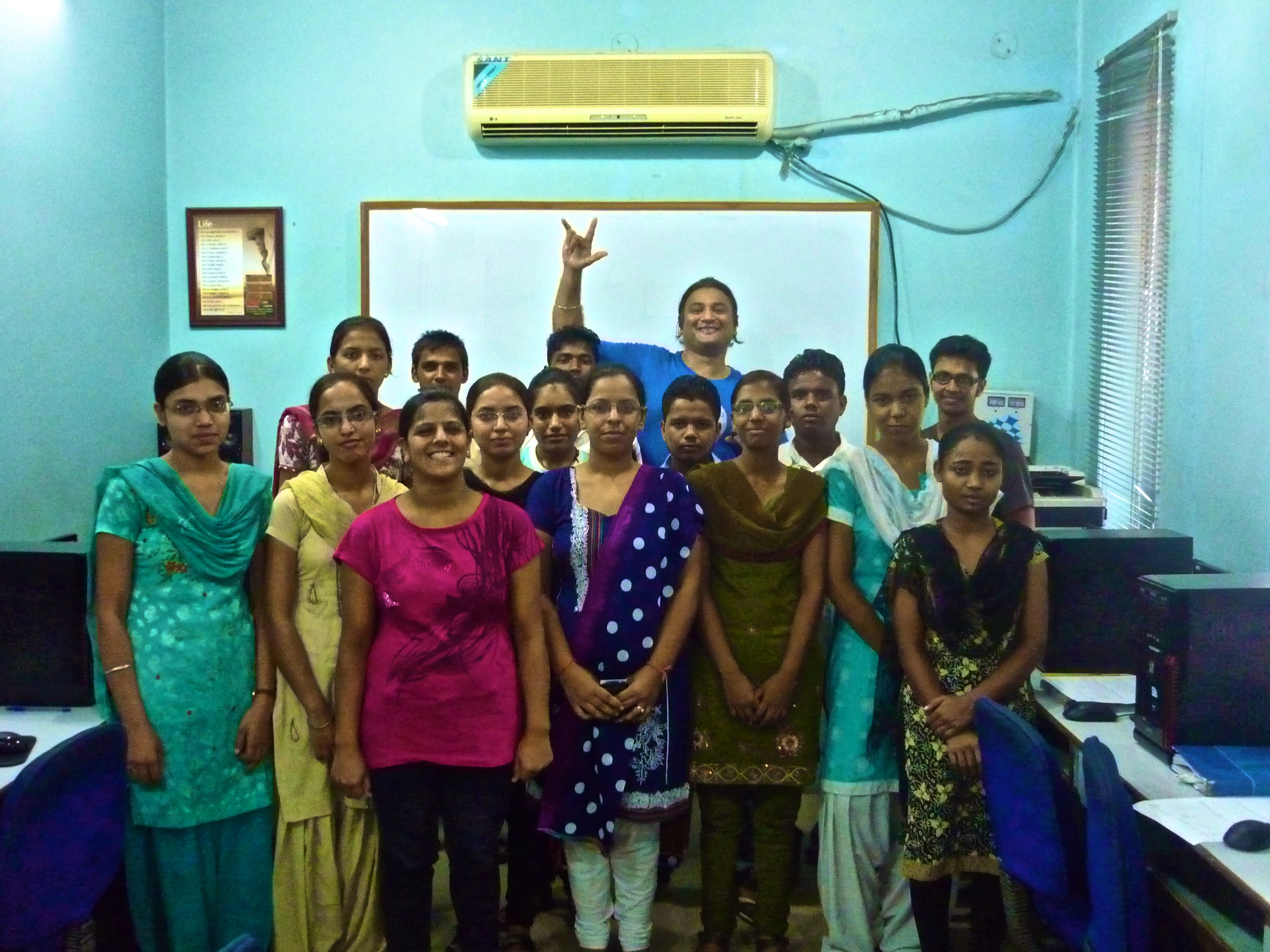
Punjabi Shalwar kameez

A Punjabi suit that features two items - a qameez (top), salwar (bottom) is the traditional attire of the Punjabi people. Shalwars are trousers which are atypically wide at the waist but which narrow to a cuffed bottom. They are held up by a drawstring or elastic belt, which causes them to become pleated around the waist. The trousers can be wide and baggy, or they can be cut quite narrow, on the bias. The kameez is a long shirt or tunic. The side seams are left open below the waist-line (the opening known as the chaak (Note: A Dictionary of Urdu, Classical Hindi, and English: chāk derives from the Persian "چاک ćāk, Fissure, cleft, rent, slit, a narrow opening (intentionally left in clothes).")), which gives the wearer greater freedom of movement. The kameez is usually cut straight and flat; older kameez use traditional cuts; modern kameez are more likely to have European-inspired set-in sleeves. The combination garment is sometimes called salwar kurta, salwar suit, or Punjabi suit. The shalwar-kameez is a widely-worn, and national dress, of Pakistan. When women wear the shalwar-kameez in some regions, they usually wear a long scarf or shawl called a dupatta around the head or neck. The dupatta is also employed as a form of modesty—although it is made of delicate material, it obscures the upper body's contours by passing over the shoulders. For Muslim women, the dupatta is a less stringent alternative to the chador or burqa (see hijab and purdah); for Sikh and Hindu women, the dupatta is useful when the head must be covered, as in a temple or the presence of elders. Everywhere in South Asia, modern versions of the attire have evolved; the shalwars are worn lower down on the waist, the kameez have shorter length, with higher splits, lower necklines and backlines, and with cropped sleeves or without sleeves.

== Festivals ==
The Punjabi Muslims typically observe the Islamic festivals. The Punjabi Sikhs and Hindus typically do not observe these, and instead observe Lohri, Basant and Vaisakhi as seasonal festivals. The Punjabi Muslim festivals are set according to the lunar Islamic calendar (Hijri), and the date falls earlier by 10 to 13 days from year to year. The Hindu and Sikh Punjabi seasonal festivals are set on specific dates of the luni-solar Bikrami calendar or Punjabi calendar and the date of the festival also typically varies in the Gregorian calendar but stays within the same two Gregorian months.

Some Punjabi Muslims participate in the traditional, seasonal festivals of the Punjab region: Baisakhi, Basant and to a minor scale Lohri, but this is controversial. Islamic clerics and some politicians have attempted to ban this participation because of the religious basis of the Punjabi festivals, and they being declared haram (forbidden in Islam).

== Habitational culture ==
Punjabi villages, known as pinds, which function as social-units, can be traditionally divided in different ways. One method is to divide them into pattis, which are further divided into thulas or als. A patti can be described as being a residential sub-classification of a village unit, which usually exists as a group of houses (often clustered together in a group and demarcated roughly from others) around a street, with the street being known as a gali or bihi. A patti is commonly named after the clan or lineage of the founder or the predominant group that inhabit them. Another naming method is based on actual or perceived characteristics of its inhabitants. The sub-division of a patti, known as a thula, are named after minimal lineages. Small, compact pattis may have no further subdivisions. Whilst a thula is a localized descent unit, an al is a descent unit which may not be localized and can be found dispersed in different pattis or even villages.Various service-orientated castes inhabit different pattis, alongside the dominant Jats, Rajputs, and other castes. Pattis are also known as gali-mohalas. In larger villages, a single patti may have its own panchayat.

Pattis can also be divided into gwand, which usually consists of five-to-ten housing units which are adjacent to one another. Neighbours of a gwand are known as gwandies, and may belong to differing caste-backgrounds. The housing unit is known as a ghar, with Punjabi houses traditionally being further subdivided into three components: dlan (main-room), rasoi or chula chaunka (kitchen), and vchra (yard). Another method of dividing the house-unit is: andrla (kitchen, bedroom, store) and bahrla (farm, animals, fodder, ) ghar, which separates the domestic domain of women from the external one. H. S. Bhatti believes the andrla and bahrla ghar division method is a later development.

A second method of dividing a village is by divvying it up by vehra (also known in some areas as agwar) or yards, which function as local-units but in some cases may be formed from a single-descent unit. This method is tied with lower castes, as the yard that low-caste groups, such as Chamars, inhabit are known as chamahri, which is isolated from the other yards inhabited by other groups of the village. In some villages, the service-orientated castes have their own vehra, which may be known as Naeean da vehra (barber-caste yard) or Ghumaran da vehra (potter-caste yard).

These habitational divisions interact with social groupings, lineages, and clans, such as kul/kandan, sharika/bhaichar, moohi (sub-clan), got (clan), and jaat (caste).

== Preservation of Punjabi culture ==
In recent years, efforts have been made to preserve and promote Punjabi culture and heritage. One notable example is the Panjab Digital Library (PDL), founded by Davinder Pal Singh. The library's mission is to digitize and preserve historical manuscripts, books, and other materials related to Punjabi language, history, and culture. This initiative has helped to safeguard and promote Punjabi culture for future generations.

== See also ==
- Punjabi Culture Day
- Punjabi calendar
- Punjabi festivals
- Punjabi festivals (Pakistan)
- Punjabi folklore
- Punjabi folk music
- Punjabi folk instruments
- Punjabi literature
- Folk practices in Punjab
- Punjabi theatre
- Punjabi people
- British Punjabis
- Punjabi Americans
- Punjabi Australians
- Punjabi Canadians
- Punjabi diaspora
- List of Punjabi language poets
- Livestock show
- Lohri
- Vaisakhi
- Punjabi Cultural Society of Chicago
- Sikh culture

== Other sources ==
- Wrestling in Punjab, documentary film on the history of wrestling in Punjab by filmmaker Simran Kaler.
- Quraishee 73, Punjabi Adab De Kahani, Abdul Hafeez Quaraihee, Azeez Book Depot, Lahore, 1973.
- Chopra 77, The Punjab as a sovereign state, Gulshan Lal Chopra, Al-Biruni, Lahore, 1977.
- Patwant Singh. 1999. The Sikhs. New York: Doubleday. ISBN 0-385-50206-0.
- Nanak, Punjabi Documentary Film by Navalpreet Rangi
- The evolution of Heroic Tradition in Ancient Panjab, 1971, Buddha Parkash.
- Social and Political Movements in ancient Panjab, Delhi, 1962, Buddha Parkash.
- History of Porus, Patiala, Buddha Parkash.
- History of the Panjab, Patiala, 1976, Fauja Singh, L. M. Joshi (Ed).
- The Legacy of The Punjab by R. M. Chopra, 1997, Punjabee Bradree, Calcutta.
