= List of Sikh festivals =

Celebrations in Sikhism

This is a list of the major festivals of the Sikh religion. The dates of Sikh celebrations are now calculated by the Nanakshahi calendar, however the observances of Guru Nanak Gurpurab, Vaisakhi, and Bandi Chhor Divas continue to be calculated according to the traditional Bikrami calendar. Three Sikh festivals coincide with other Indian celebrations, namely Hola Mohalla and Holi, Bandi Chhor Diwas and Diwali, and Khalsa Sajna Diwas and Vaisakhi.

== List ==
Festival	Date Observed	Description	Image
Shaheedi Jor Maghi Mela (Mela Maghi)	January 14	This festival commemorates to the 40 Muktas (40 Martyrs) who fought in the Battle of Muktsar.	
Parkash Utsav Dasmeh Patshah Sri Guru Gobind Singh Ji (Guru Gobind Singh Gurpurab)	January 5	This festival's name, when translated, means the birth celebration of the 10th Divine Light, or Divine Knowledges. It commemorates the birth of Guru Gobind Singh, the tenth Sikh guru. The festival is one of the most widely celebrated event by Sikhs.	
Sikh New Year	March 13 or 14 (typically 14th)	The Sikh new year in accordance to the Sikh Calendar (Nanakshahi Calendar).	
Hola Mohalla	March 15	An annual festival of thousands held at Anandpur Sahib. It was started by Guru Gobind Singh as a gathering of Sikhs for military exercises and mock battles. The mock battles were followed by kirtan and valour poetry competitions. Today the Nihang Singhs carry on the martial tradition with mock battles and displays of swordsmanship and horse riding. There are also a number of darbars where kirtan is sung. It is celebrated by Sikhs across the world as 'Sikh Olympics' with events and competitions of swordsmanship, horse riding, Gatka (Sikh martial arts), falconry and others by Nihang Singhs.	
Vaisakhi (Khalsa Sajna Diwas)	April 14	In Punjab it is celebrated as the Birth of the Khalsa brotherhood. It is celebrated at a large scale at Kesgarh Sahib, Anandpur Sahib. In India, U.K., Canada, United States, and other Sikh populated areas, people come together for a public mela or parade. The main part of the mela is where a local Sikh Temple (Gurdwara) has a beautiful Sikh themed float on which the Guru Granth Sahib is located and every one offers their respect by bowing with much reverence and fervour. To mark the celebrations, Sikh devotees generally attend the Gurudwara before dawn with flowers and offerings in hands. Processions through towns are also common. Vaisakhi is the day on which the Khalsa was born and Sikhs were given a clear identity and a code of conduct to live by, led by the 10th Sikh Guru, Guru Gobind Singh Ji, who baptized the first Sikhs using sweet nectar called Amrit. The Sikh celebration of Vaisakhi is known as Khalsa Sajna Diwas.	
Shaheedi Diwas of Guru Arjan	June 16	Martyrdom of Guru Arjan: The martyrdom anniversary of Guru Arjan, the fifth Guru, falls in June, the hottest month in India. He was tortured to death under the orders of Mughal Emperor, Jahangir, on the complaint of a Hindu banker Chandu Lal, who bore a personal enmity with Guru, at Lahore on 25 May 1606. Celebrations consist of Kirtan, Katha and Langar in the Gurdwara. Because of hot summer, chilled sweetened drink made from milk, sugar, essence and water is freely distributed in Gurdwaras and in neighborhoods to everybody irrespective of their religious belief as a sign and honour of the humble Guru who happily accepted his torture as a will of Waheguru and made no attempt to take any action.	
Pahila Prakash Sri Guru Granth Sahib Ji	September 1	It is the day when the Guru Granth Sahib was bestowed with the title of being the eternal and final Sikh guru thus ending the line of Human gurus.	
Bandi Chhor Divas	October 27	On the day of Bandi Chhor Diwas (The Celebration of Freedom), Sikhs celebrate the release from prison of the sixth guru, Guru Hargobind, who also rescued 52 Hindu kings held captive by Mughal Emperor Jehangir with him in the Gwalior Fort in 1619. The Sikhs celebrated by lighting their homes with lights and candles with the tradition continuing till date with Harmandir Sahib beautifully decorated with colourful lights to mark this celebration. It is celebrated by lighting divas and going to a Gurdwara to listen to gurbani.	
Guru Nanak Gurpurab	November 15	On this day Guru Nanak was born in Nanakana Sahib, now situated in Pakistan. Every year Sikhs celebrate this day with large-scale gatherings. Candles, divas and lights are lit in Gurdwaras, in the honour of Guru along with fireworks. The birthday celebration usually lasts three days. Generally two days before the birthday, Akhand Path (forty-eight-hour non-stop reading of Guru Granth Sahib) is held in the Gurdwara. One day before the birthday, a procession is organized which is led by the Panj Pyares (Five Beloved Ones) and the Palki (Palanquin) of Sri Guru Granth Sahib and followed by teams of Ragis singing hymns, brass bands playing different tunes and devotees singing the chorus.	
Shaheedi Diwas of Guru Tegh Bahadur	November 24	Martyrdom of Guru Tegh Bahadur: On this day Guru Tegh Bahadur was martyred when he refused to convert to Islam. The Mughal Emperor, Aurangzeb cherished the ambition of converting India into a land of Islam. His experiment was first carried out in Kashmir. The viceroy of Kashmir carried out the policy vigorously and set about converting non-Muslims by force. A group of Kashmiri Pandits (Kashmiri Hindu Brahmins), approached Guru Tegh Bahadur and asked for his help. They, on the advice of the Guru, told the Mughal authorities that they would willingly embrace Islam if Guru Tegh Bahadur, did the same.Orders of the arrest of the Guru were issued by Aurangzeb and the Guru was arrested at a place called Malikhpur near Anandpur after he had departed from Anandpur for Delhi. He was arrested, along with some of his followers and sent to Sirhind the following day. The Governor ordered him to be detained in Bassi Pathana and reported the news to Delhi. His arrest was made in July 1675 and he was kept in custody for over three months. He was then cast in an iron cage and taken to Delhi in November 1675. The Guru was put in chains and ordered to be tortured until he would accept Islam. When he could not be persuaded to abandon his faith to save himself from persecution, he was asked to perform some miracles to prove his divinity. On his refusal, Guru Tegh Bahadur was beheaded in public at Chandni Chowk on 11 November 1675. Guru Ji is also known as "Hind Di Chadar" i.e. "the shield of India", suggesting that to save Hinduism, Guru Ji gave his life.	
Shaheedi Jor Mela	December 21 and 26	Martyrdom of the Sahibzade: The Martyrdom of both the elder and younger Sahibzadas is a remembrance of the four young princes (sons of Guru Gobind Singh) who were martyred in late December. The two older sons, Sahibzade Ajit Singh and Jujhar Singh, were killed by Mughal soldiers during the battle of Chamkaur. Both the younger sons Sahibzade Zorawar Singh and Fateh Singh, were executed after being captured. These Martyrs are observed 21 December and 26 December respectively.	

== Other Sikh festivals ==
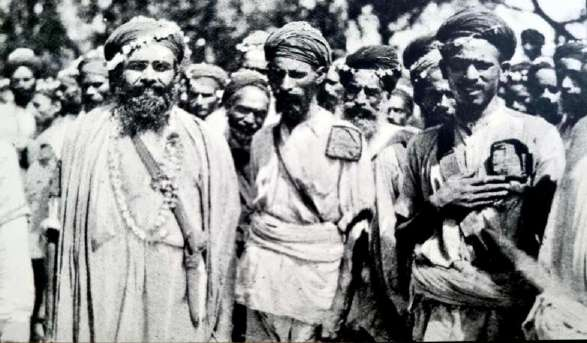
Photograph of a group of Sikh men during the Basant Panchami festival, February 1924

There are some other (around 45) festivals that are celebrated at a much smaller scale with some being centred in particular regions or towns that are not included in the above list. Thoses include Parkash Utsavs (Birth anniversaries of the other 8 Sikh gurus), Gurgadi Divas (passing of guruship), Jyotijot Divas (death anniversaries of other Sikh gurus), Basant Festival of kites which is celebrated in Chheharta Sahib Gurdwara in the village of Wadali where Sri Guru Hargobind Ji was born in 1595, to celebrate the birth and many other festivals. All Sikh festival include celebrating by gathering at Gurdwara, paying obeisance to the Guru Granth Sahib and listening to Gurbani, Kirtan and reciting Paath.

However, there are quite a few other local fairs which are historically important to the Sikhs and attract crowds in hundreds of thousands and last two to three days. The most important of these are:

- The Martyrdom of both the younger Sahibzadas of Guru Gobind Singh at Fatehgarh Sahib.
- The Second Battle of Chamkaur and the Martyrdom of both elder Sahibzadas of Guru Gobind Singh.
- The Martyrdom of the Chali Mukte ("Forty Liberated Ones") of Guru Gobind Singh who had previously deserted him, fought bravely against overwhelming Mughal army forces in Muktsar. Guru Gobind Singh blessed them as having achieved liberation. Mela Maghi commemorates this event and an annual fair is held in Sri Muktsar Sahib town.

== See also ==
- Punjabi festivals
- List of fairs and festivals in Punjab, India
- Punjabi festivals in Pakistan
