= Punjabi Cultural Society of Chicago =

The Punjabi Cultural Society of Chicago is a nonprofit organization located in Palatine, Illinois which seeks to encourage Punjabi culture in the Chicago area and the Midwestern United States. The Punjabi Cultural Society (PCS) was incorporated in response to disagreements with the older Punjabi Heritage Organization.

PCS is responsible for many events for the community, including Rangla Punjab, the premier Punjabi variety show, and also PCS Night which has recently had artists Apna Sangeet, Jazzy Bains, and the Safri Boyz. PCS also promotes the culture by providing dholis for various mainstream events such as the inauguration of Millennium Park in Chicago, IL, and also the Passport to the World event in the Children's Museum at Navy Pier.

In 2019, PCC Chicago celebrated its 25th anniversary with a variety of cultural, musical and dancing routines of Punjabis. It was held at the College of Dupage. Over 1,000 people attended the festivities.
