= Punjabi festivals (Pakistan) =

Punjabis are the majority ethnic group in Pakistan. They celebrate a number of religious and cultural festivals:

== List and description of Islamic festivals ==
Religious festivals are determined by the Islamic calendar.

Festival	Date Observed (from year to year dates vary)	Pictures	Description
Shab-e-Barat	Sha'ban (Islamic calendar)		Shab-e-barat (lailat ul-barat or the night of deliverance) is held in the middle of Shaban (eighth month of the Islamic calendar). It is regarded as a night when the fortunes of men for the coming year are decided and when Allah may forgive sinners. Believers offer special prayers for unity, prosperity, security and restoration of peace in the country and the prosperity and unity of entire Muslim Ummah. Mosques in places such as Lahore are decorated to celebrate the occasion while arrangements for refreshments and food are also made to facilitate worshippers. Worshippers also visit graveyards to pray for the departed souls.
Eid ul-Adha	Zilhij (Islamic calendar)	Eid prayer in Badshahi Mosque, Lahore	Eid-ul-Azha is celebrated to commemorate the occasion when Abraham was ready to sacrifice his son, Ismail, on God's command. Abraham was awarded by God by replacing Ismail with a goat. Muslims make pilgrimage (hajj) to Mecca during this time. Muslims sacrifice animals including cow, goat, sheep and camel according to their purchasing power. The children celebrate Eid ul-Adha and Eid ul-Fitr with great pump and show and receive gifts and Eidi (money) from parents and others.
Eid-ul-Fitr	Ramadan (Islamic calendar)		Ramadan is the time of fasting that continues throughout the ninth month. On this day, after a month of fasting, Muslims express their joy and happiness by offering a congregational prayer in the mosques. Special celebration meals are served.
Eid-e-Milad-un- Nabi	Rabi'al-Awal (Islamic calendar)	International Mawlid Conference, Minar-e-Pakistan, Lahore, Pakistan.	Eid-e-Milad-un- Nabi is an Islamic festival in honour of the birthday of Muhammad. The festival is observed in the third month of the Islamic lunar calendar called Rabi'al-Awal. Various processions take place in Lahore to celebrate the festival. According to Nestorovic (2016), hundreds of thousands of people gather at Minare-Pakistan, Lahore, between the intervening night of 11th and 12th Rabi' al-awwal of the Islamic calendar. The festival was declared a national holiday in Pakistan in 1949.
Muharram	Muharram (Islamic calendar)	A street observation of Muharram in Lahore Pakistan	Remembrance of Muharram is a set of rituals associated with both Shia and Sunni Muslims. The event marks the anniversary of the Battle of Karbala when Imam Hussein ibn Ali, the grandson of Muhammad, was killed by the forces of the second Umayyad caliph Yazid I at Karbala. Family members, accompanying Hussein ibn Ali, were killed or subjected to humiliation. The commemoration of the event during yearly mourning season, from first of Muharram to twentieth of Safar with Ashura comprising the focal date, serves to define Shia communal identity. Various Tazia, Alam and Zuljinnah processions are taken out in Punjab.

== List and description of festivals observed at shrines ==
The festivals held at shrines are determined by the Islamic calendar and the Punjabi calendar.

Festival	Date Observed (from year to year dates vary)	Pictures	Description
Mela Chiraghan	(Varies)	Shrine of Maddho Lal Hussein, Lahore	Mela Chiraghan is a three-day annual festival to mark the urs (death anniversary) of the Punjabi Sufi poet and saint Shah Hussain (1538-1599) who lived in Lahore in the 16th century. It takes place at the shrine of Shah Hussain in Baghbanpura, on the outskirts of Lahore, Pakistan, adjacent to the Shalimar Gardens.
Baha-ud-Din Zakariya	Safar (Islamic calendar)	Bahauddin Zakariya Tomb	Sheikh Baha-ud-Din Zakariya known as Bahawal Haq was born at Kot Aror near Multan, towards the end of twelfth century. The annual festival of Baha-ud-Din Zakariya's death is celebrated on 27th Safar, the second month of Islamic calendar.
Data Baksh	Safar (Islamic calendar)	Compound of Data Ganj Baksh Shrine, Lahore	Abul Hassan Ali Ibn Usman al-Jullabi al-Hajveri al-Ghaznawi or Abul Hassan Ali Hajvari, also known as Daata Ganj Bakhsh, which means the master who bestows treasures) was a Sufi of the 11th century. He was born around 990 CE near Ghazni, present day Afghanistan, during the Ghaznavid Empire and died in Lahore in 1072 CE. Ali Hajvari is famous for his mausoleum in Lahore, which is surrounded by a large marble courtyard, a mosque and other buildings. It is the most frequented of all the shrines in that city, and one of the most famous in Pakistan and nearby countries. His Urs is on the 19th of the Islamic month of Safar.
Sakhi Sarwar urs	Baisakh (Punjabi calendar)	Annual Urs celebrations at the shrine of Syed Zain ul Abideen, Sultan Sarwar	Syed Ahmad Sultan, popularly known as Sakhi Sarwar, was a 12th-century Sufi saint of the Punjab. Various fairs are held in the Punjab. The shrine at Nigaha holds a week-long Baisakhi fair in the month of April.
Sakhi Ghulam Qadir	10 Chait (Punjabi calendar)		The urs are celebrated on 10 Chait. His shrine is about 5 kilometres away from Pak Pattan.
Baba Farid urs	Muharram (Islamic calendar)	Bab-e-Jannat at Darbar Baba Farid ud Deen Ganj Shakar	Shaikh Farid was a thirteenth-century saint. The Urs (death anniversary) of Baba Farid, takes place at the Muharram (the first month of the Muslim calendar). Up to 0.9 million devotees visited the shrine during the urs in 2016. The Bahishtī Darwāza (Gate of Paradise) is opened only once a year, during the time of the Urs fair. Hundreds of thousands of pilgrims and visitors from all over the country and the world come to pay homage. The door of the Bahishti Darwaza is made of silver, with floral designs inlaid in gold leaf. This "Gate to Paradise" is padlocked all year, and only opened for ten days from sunset to sunrise in the month of Muharram. Some followers believe that by crossing this door all of one's sins are washed away.
Urs of Waris Shah	9-11 Sawan (Punjabi calendar)		The urs of Punjabi poet and saint Waris Shah is held at Jandiala Sher Khan. The urs are held on the 9-11 of the month of Sawan in the Punjabi calendar. Recently the Punjab Government has decided to celebrate the urs in September. The saint is famous for his composition of the love epic Heer.
Mian Mir fairs	Varies	Mian-Mir-Mausoleum	Mian Mir died in Lahore in 1045 A.H. (1635 AD) at the advanced age of 88 years, having lived in Lahore for sixty years. In addition to the fair on the anniversary, other fairs are held at his mausoleum during the two months of the rainy season.

== List and description of cultural festivals ==
Cultural festivals are determined by the Gregorian calendar or the Punjabi calendar.

Festival	Date Observed (from year to year dates vary)	Description
Punjabi Culture Day	14 March (Gregorian calendar)	Punjabi cultural celebration Punjabi culture day is celebrated on 14 March for the celebration and demonstration of Punjabi culture by Punjabis and Punjabi diaspora. On Punjabi culture day, events such as music, dance, bhangra, plays, exhibition, film festival, food and traditional dresses in the form of stalls to introduce cultural values to new generations of Punjabis. In different programmes, tribute are paid to masters in the field of Fine Arts with purpose of promoting love and courtesy on national level.
National Horse and Cattle Show	Varies	Horse and Cattle Show Lahore Tent Pegging Lahore hosts the annual National Horse and Cattle show. The show features tattoo shows, tent-pegging, horse dancing, dog races, polo, equestrian jumping, exhibition of industrial and agricultural products, besides, competition of milk-producing animals among cattle breeders.
Literary festivals	Varies	Various literary festivals are held in the Punjab. One such festival is the Lyallpur Suleikh Mela which hosts the event through the medium of the Punjabi language.
Pakistan Day	23 March (Gregorian calendar)	The Sherdils of PAF performing aerial acrobatics during the 2015 parade Pakistan day, on which Pakistan Resolution was passed in 1940, is celebrated in the country. Illumination of important buildings and military parade at Islamabad are the main events of the festival The Minar-e-Pakistan glances on the eve of 23 March 2014. Parallel steps by Pakistan Army.
Lohri	Poh (Punjabi calendar)	Lohri bonfire Lohri is a midwinter Punjabi festival that marks the passing of the winter solstice and the end of winter. It is celebrated in the month of Poh in the Punjabi calendar every year.
Baisakhi	Vaisakh (Punjabi calendar) April	Various festivals in rural Punjab Bull cart races feature in Besakhi fairs Baisakhi is also called Vaisakhi and Besakhi. It is a harvest festival celebrated when the rabi crop is ready for harvesting. The harvesting is started with folk music and dancing such as bhangra which is performed with zeal at rural melas. According to Abbasi (1992), bhangra is primarily associated with the Bisakhi festival to inaugurate the reaping operations of wheat crops in the central Punjab. Colourful festivals are held at the time of Besakhi when farmers are free to enjoy their leisure time. Various literary festivals, animal races and fairs are organised in Lahore, Eminabad and Faisalabad. The annual Lok Mela organised by the National Institute of Folk and Traditional Heritage in Islamabad celebrated the Vaisakhi Festival at the open-air theatre in 2017. The camel and cattle trading at the Besakhi mela in Dera Ghazi Khan surpasses the much propagated camel fair of Pushkar in Rajasthan (India).
Basant	Phaggan (Punjabi calendar)	Basant is a seasonal festival and is celebrated by wearing yellow, eating food with yellow colouring such as potatoes with turmeric and saffron rice, and holding parties. In the villages, the festival involves holding fairs, distributing sweets and decorating horses and cattle. Another feature of Basant is flying kites. However, there is a ban on kite flying around the festival period in Pakistan imposed due to kite strings ensnaring and injuring moped and motorcycle drivers when they caught on ground-level objects.

== See also ==
- Punjabi festivals
- Punjabi culture
- Punjabi Culture Day
- Punjabi calendar
- Festivals in Lahore
- Festivals in Multan
- Lohri
- Vaisakhi
- Sikh festivals
- List of fairs and festivals in Punjab, India
