= Bhangala (disambiguation) =

Bhangala is a village of Punjab, India.

Bhangala may also refer to:

- Bhangala, Jalandhar, a village in Phillaur in Jalandhar district, India

== See also ==
- Bhanga Bazar, Karimganj district, Assam
- Bhangaha, Mahottari District, Province No. 2, Nepal
- Bhangal Kalan, a village in Shaheed Bhagat Singh Nagar district, Punjab, India
- Bhangara, Nepal, Parbat District, Dhawalagiri Zone, Nepal
