= Malpur =

Malpur is the name of:

- Malpur Arkan, a village in Punjab, India
- Malpur State, a defunct princely state (1466-1943) in present day Gujarat, India
- Malpur, Aravalli, a census town in Gujarat, India
- Malpur, Bachhrawan, a village in Uttar Pradesh, India
- Malpur, Islamabad, a village near Islamabad, Pakistan
- Malpur, Khiron, a village in Uttar Pradesh, India
- Malpur, SBS Nagar, a village in Punjab State, India
- Mal Pur, council in Pakistan

== See also ==
- Malpora
- Malpura
