= Malpur Arkan =

Malpur Arkan is a small village in the Punjab located on the Banga Road, approximately halfway between Nawanshahr and Banga. The village is located in the district of Nawanshahr, Doaba. The village of Malpur Arkan is close to the villages of Mungowal, Khama, Kariha, Bhangalan and Khatkar Kalan.

The village is developing considerably with a newly developed Gurdwara and upgraded local school (10th grade). The village has a very tight community where everyone is known to each other which makes it a very special village.

== Transportation ==
Malpur Arkan is well linked by rail with the nearest rail station being Kariha Railway Station (1 km) and by road with Nawanshahr, Banga, Chandigarh and Gurshankar. The nearest local airport is at Chandigargh, and the nearest International airport is Amritsar.
