= Aawat pauni =

Traditional Punjabi harvest gathering

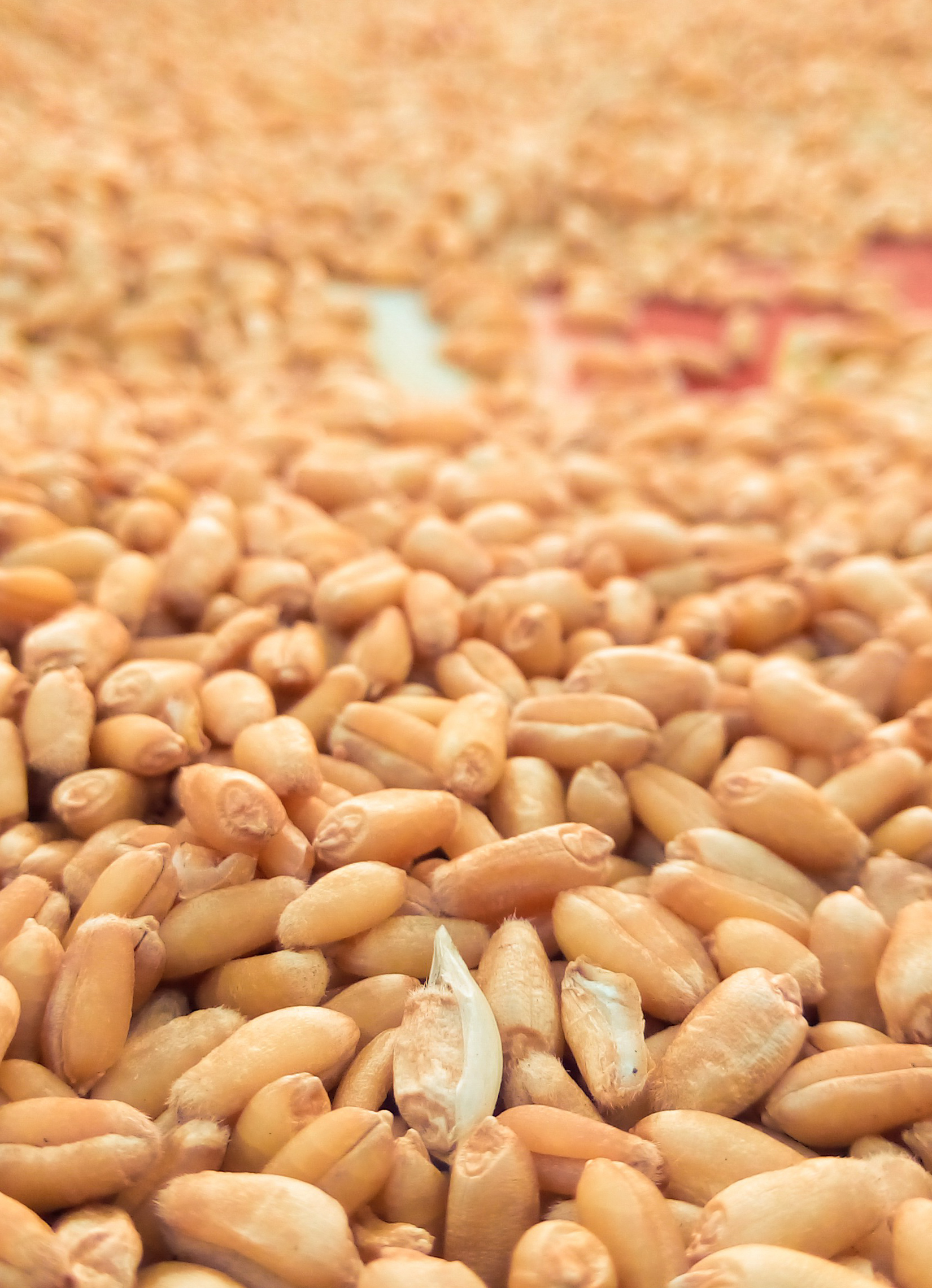
Wheat

Aawat pauni (Punjabi: ਆਵਤ ਪਾਓੁਣੀ) is a traditional Punjabi gathering of peasants and farm workers to harvest crops collectively, and was popular during the harvesting period around Vaisakhi.

Aawat (Punjabi: ਆਵਤ) means to "come over" or "to arrive". Before the common use of machinery, farmers harvested their land by inviting friends, relatives and workers to harvest the field. The guests would be fellow villagers or from distant places. Although the tradition has waned, it has not completely become extinct.

The people participating in the Aawat pauni tradition are given meals three times a day. The group is normally in the region of 20 men who work to the tunes of the Punjab dhol (drum). The men sing traditional Punjabi dohe which are a form of folk poetry. It has also become fashionable to play songs from loud speakers.

The guests are given traditional Punjabi food such as shakar (refined jaggery), ghee (butter), karhah, kheer, sevian (Vermicelli), yogurt and milk.

Families hold Aawat if they have large landholdings, there has been a death in the family or cultivating cattle have died due to some disease, flood or any other natural calamity. Aawat is a form of asking for help.

== Types of Aawat pauni ==
- Harvesting
- Putting on a roof over a house
- To showcase already harvested crops to family members and friends.

== Dohe ==
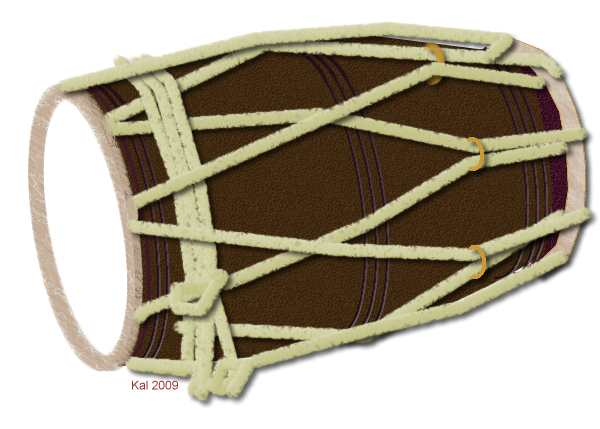
Dholak

One man will sing a doha. An example is:

ਕੋਠੇ ਉੱਤੇ ਕੋਠੜੀ, ਉਤੇ ਨਾਰ ਸੁਕਾਵੇ ਕੇਸ
ਕਿਤੇ ਯਾਰ ਦਿਖਾਈ ਦੇ ਗਿਆ ਬਦਲ ਕੇ ਭਰਾਵਾਂ, ਗਭਰੂਆ ਓ ਭੇਸ

Transliteration

Kothey ute kothrhi, ute nar sukave kes
kite yaar dikhai de gya badal ke bharava, gabhrua oh bhes

Translation

an extension upon a house, my lover is drying her hair
somehow my lover has given me a glimpse of her, oh brother, in disguise

The other men join the singing from the second line and sing 'gabhrua oh bhes' at which point the drum beat picks up and men will also dance freestyle.
