= Kariha =

- Village
- Location in Punjab, India Kariha (India)
- Coordinates: 31.1429684°N 76.0581354°E
- Country: India
- State: Punjab
- District: Shaheed Bhagat Singh Nagar

Government
  - Type: Panchayat raj
  - Body: Gram panchayat
- Elevation: 351 m (1,152 ft)

Population (2011)
  - Total: 2,533
- Sex ratio 1273/1256 ♂/♀

Languages
  - Official: Punjabi
- Time zone: UTC+5:30 (IST)
- PIN: 144508
- Telephone code: 01823
- ISO 3166 code: IN-PB
- Post office: Naura
- Website: nawanshahr.nic.in

Kariha is a village in Shaheed Bhagat Singh Nagar district of Punjab State, India. It is located 6.1 kilometres (3.8 mi) away from postal head office Naura, 6.3 kilometres (3.9 mi) from Nawanshahr, 8.4 kilometres (5.2 mi) from district headquarter Shaheed Bhagat Singh Nagar and 97 kilometres (60 mi) from state capital Chandigarh. The village is administrated by Sarpanch an elected representative of the village.

== Demography ==
As of 2011, Kariha has a total number of 504 houses and population of 2533 of which 1277 include are males while 1256 are females according to the report published by Census India in 2011. The literacy rate of Kariha is 79.33% higher than the state average of 75.84%. The population of children under the age of 6 years is 279 which is 11.01% of total population of Kariha, and child sex ratio is approximately 836 as compared to Punjab state average of 846.

Most of the people are from Schedule Caste which constitutes 67.31% of total population in Kariha. The town does not have any Schedule Tribe population so far.

As per the report published by Census India in 2011, 855 people were engaged in work activities out of the total population of Kariha which includes 712 males and 143 females. According to census survey report 2011, 57.66% workers describe their work as main work and 42.34% workers are involved in Marginal activity providing livelihood for less than 6 months.

== Education ==
The village has a Punjabi medium, co-ed upper primary with secondary/higher secondary school established in 1978. The school provide mid-day meal as per Indian Midday Meal Scheme. As per Right of Children to Free and Compulsory Education Act the school provide free education to children between the ages of 6 and 14. The village also has a private un-aided English medium, co-ed primary with upper primary and secondary/higher secondary school established in 2013.

Amardeep Singh Shergill Memorial college Mukandpur and Sikh National College Banga are the nearest colleges. Industrial Training Institute for women (ITI Nawanshahr) is 8 kilometres (5.0 mi) The village is 59 kilometres (37 mi) from Indian Institute of Technology and 40 kilometres (25 mi) away from Lovely Professional University.

== Transport ==
Khatkar Kalan Jhandaji railway station is the nearest train station however, Garhshankar Junction railway station is 16 kilometres (9.9 mi) away from the village. Sahnewal Airport is the nearest domestic airport which located 63 kilometres (39 mi) away in Ludhiana and the nearest international airport is located in Chandigarh also Sri Guru Ram Dass Jee International Airport is the second nearest airport which is 148 kilometres (92 mi) away in Amritsar.

== See also ==
- List of villages in India
