= Vaisakhi =

Religious festival in Sikhism and Hinduism

- Official name: Vaisakhi
- Also called: Baisakhi, Vaisakha Jayanti, Visakhī, Mesadi, Basoa, Vaisakhi
- Observed by: Indians, Punjabis, Sikhs
- Type: Religious and harvest festival
- Significance: Solar new year, cultural day, harvest festival, birth of the Khalsa
- Celebrations: Fairs, processions, and temple decorations
- Observances: Religious gatherings and practices
- Begins: 1 Vaisakh (13 April)
- Ends: 2 Vaisakh (14 April)
- Date: 13 or 14 April
- Duration: 2 days
- Related to: South and Southeast Asian solar New Year

Vaisakhi (Sanskrit: [ʋɐi̯ɕaːkʰiː], Vaisākhī), also known as Baisakhi (IPA: [bɛːsaːkʰiː]) or Mesadi or Basoa (IPA: [meːsaːɖiː]), marks the first day of the month of Vaisakh and is traditionally celebrated annually on 13 April or 14 April. It is seen as a spring harvest celebration primarily in Punjab and Northern India. While it is culturally significant in many parts of India as a festival of harvest, Vaisakhi is also the date for the Indian Solar New Year. However, Sikhs celebrate the new year on the first the month Chet, according to the Nanakshahi calendar.

Historically, Vaisakhi was one of the major annual market occasions in northern India. Although Vaisakhi began as a grain harvest festival for Hindus and its observance predates the creation of Sikhism, it gained historical association with the Sikhs following the inauguration of the Khalsa. The celebration coincides with various regional, traditional New Year celebrations in the Indian subcontinent.

For Sikhs, in addition to its significance as the harvest festival, during which Sikhs hold kirtans, visit local gurdwaras, community fairs, hold nagar kirtan processions, raise the Nishan Sahib flag, and gather to socialize and share festive foods, Vaisakhi observes major events in the history of Sikhism and the Indian subcontinent that happened in the Punjab region. Vaisakhi as a major Sikh festival marks the birth of the Khalsa order by Guru Gobind Singh, the tenth Guru of Sikhism, on 13 April 1699. Later, Ranjit Singh was proclaimed as Maharaja of the Sikh Empire on 12 April 1801 (to coincide with Vaisakhi), creating a unified political state.

Vaisakhi was also the day when British Indian Army officer Reginald Dyer ordered his troops to shoot into a protesting crowd in Amritsar, an event which would come to be known the Jallianwala Bagh massacre; the massacre proved influential to the history of the Indian independence movement.

The holiday is also observed by cultural Hindu communities and is known by various regional names in other parts of India. For many Hindu communities, the festival is an occasion to ritually bathe in sacred rivers such as Ganges, Jhelum, and Kaveri, visit temples, meet friends, take part in other festivities, and perform a mandatory daan (charity) especially of hand fans, water pitchers and seasonal fruits. Community fairs are held at Hindu pilgrimage sites. In many areas, processions of temple deities are taken out. The holiday also marks the worship and propitiation of various deities, such as Durga in Himachal Pradesh, Surya in Bihar, and Vishnu in southern India.

== Date ==
Vaisakhi is observed on the 13 or 14 April every year in the 21st century. However, in 1801 AD, it fell on 11 April. This is because the date of Vaisakhi and other Sankrantis keeps changing slowly over years. Vaisakhi would fall on 29 April in Year 2999. The festival coincides with other new year festivals celebrated on the first day of Vaisakh in other regions of the Indian subcontinent such as Puthandu, Pohela Boishakh, Bohag Bihu, and Vishu.

It is one of three Sikh celebrations still calculated using the traditional Bikrami calendar, alongside Bandi Chhor Divas and Guru Nanak Gurpurab, where as the rest are determined now as per the Nanakshahi calendar.

== Etymology and pronunciation ==
The word Vaisakhi or Baisakhi is an Apabhraṃśa form evolved from the word Vaiśākhī (वैशाखी), derived from the name of the Indian month of Vaishakha. There is no distinction between sounds 'sha' (श) & 'sa' (स) and between 'va' (व) & 'ba' (ब) in Prakrit & Apbhramsa. Hence the name, Vaisakhi or Baisakhi. Vaisakhi which is observed on Sankranti of Vaisakh (Vaishakh) month literally means 'related to Vaisakh month', which in turn is derived from the name of a Nakshatra known as Vishakha. In Punjab region, the word Vaisakhi is common, but in the Dogra regions, and the Doabi and Malwai dialects of Punjab, speakers often substitute a B for a V, so it is known as Baisakhi or Basakhi; also people in Jammu call it Basoa. In tonal languages like Bengali, it is pronounced as 'Boishakhi'.

== Hinduism ==
=== In India ===
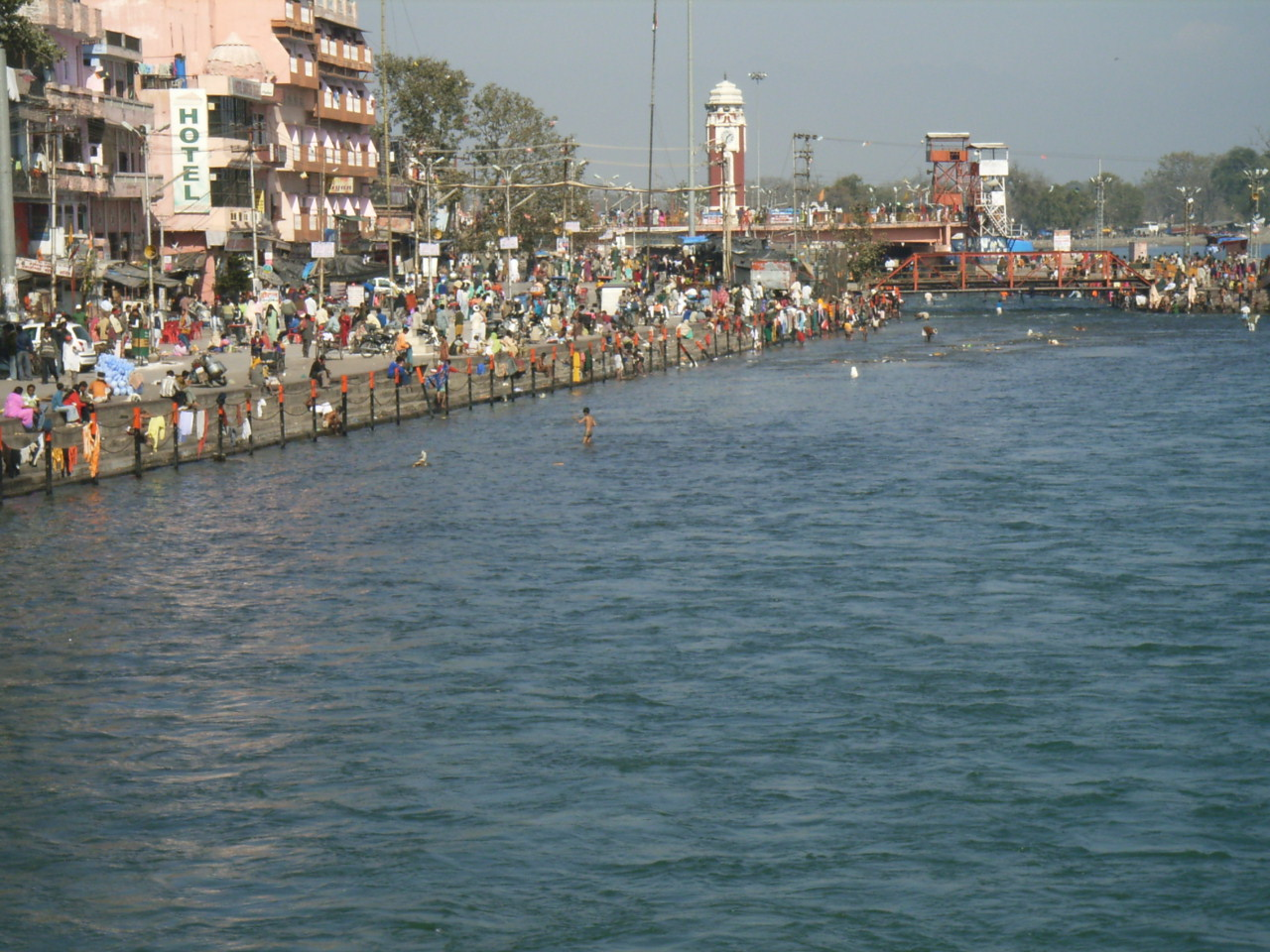
Bathing in rivers is a Vaisakhi tradition

For most of the Hindus, the first day of Vaisakh marks the traditional solar new year, in Assam, Bengal, Bihar, Himachal Pradesh, Haryana, Kerala, Odisha, Punjab Tamil Nadu, Uttar Pradesh, Uttrakhand and other parts of India. However, this is not the universal new year for all Hindus. For some, such as those in and near Gujarat, the new year festivities coincide with the five-day Diwali festival. For others, the new year falls on Cheti Chand, Gudi Padwa and Ugadi which falls a few weeks earlier. The harvest is complete and crops ready to sell, representing a time of plenty for the farmers. Fairs and special thanksgiving pujas (prayers) are common in the Hindu tradition. It is available in the Vanis of the saints that in Satlok, the Vaisakhi-like atmosphere always remains there.

It is regionally known by many names among the Hindus, though the festivities and its significance is similar. It is celebrated by Hindus bathing in sacred rivers, as they believe that river goddess Ganges descended to earth on Vaisakhi from Svarga. Some rivers considered particularly sacred include the Ganges, Jhelum and Kaveri. Hindus visit temples, meet friends and party over festive foods.

==== Haridwar, Uttarakhand ====
Vaisakhi is the day when Hindus believe River Goddess Ganga descended on earth from heaven. One of the largest Vaisakhi fair in India is held at Haridwar, which is an important Hindu pilgrimage. Around 50 lakhs (5 million) pilgrims throng Brahm Kund in Haridwar to take a dip in Ganga river on this festival. Historical records stress the importance of the Vaisakhi festival at Haridwar, where a lot of trade would occur. However, the onset of railroad travel decreased its importance from the 19th century onwards.

==== Punjab, India ====
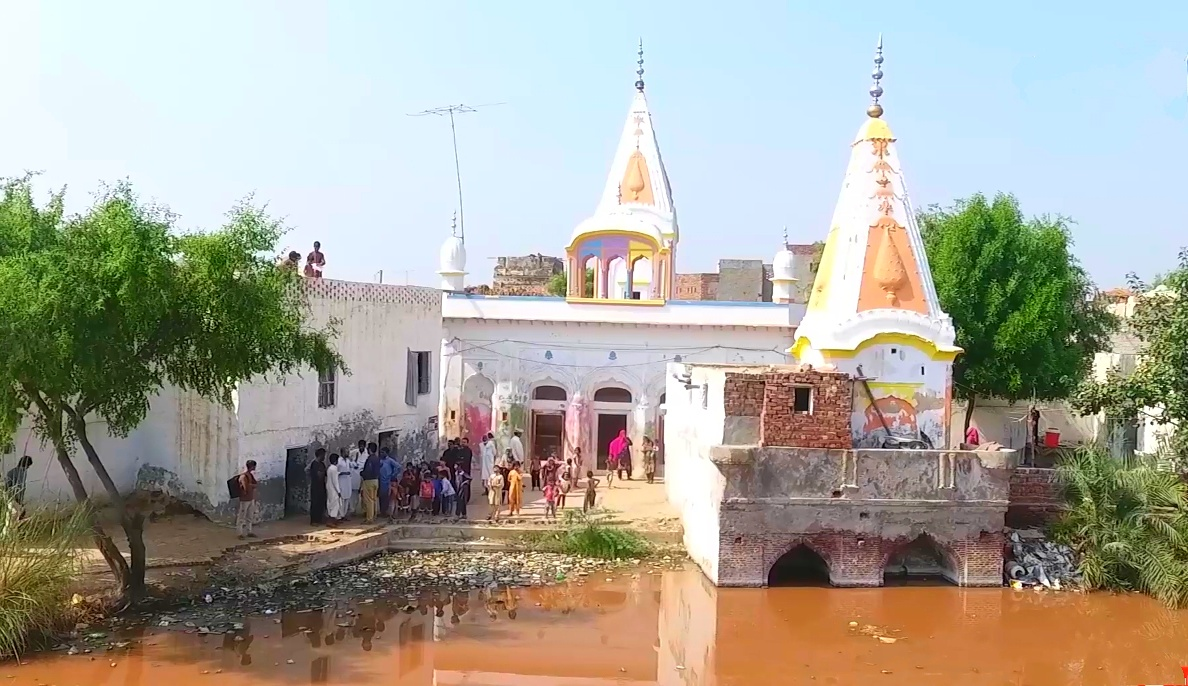
Baba Ram Thaman Shrine

In Punjab, the Hindu Shrine of Katas Raj was known for its Vaisakhi fair. It was attended by around 10,000 pilgrims who were mostly Hindus. Similarly, at the shrine of Bairagi Baba Ram Thaman, a Vaisakhi fair was held annually since 16th century CE which was attended by around 60,000 pilgrims and Bairagi saints from all over India used to throng the shrine.

The Vaisakhi fair is at Thakurdwara of Bhagwan Narainji at Pandori Mahatan village in Gurdaspur district of Punjab where the fair lasts for three days from 1st Vaisakha to 3rd Vaisakha. The celebrations start in form of procession on morning of 1st Vaisakha, carrying Mahant in a palanquin by Brahmacharis and devotees. After that Navgraha Puja is held and charities in money, grains and cows are done. At evening, Sankirtan is held in which Mahant delivers religious discourses and concludes it by distributing prasad of Patashas (candy drops). Pilgrims also take ritual bathings at sacred tank in the shrine.

==== Jammu ====
Vaisakhi is an important festival among Dogra Hindus of Jammu region. On this day, people get up early in the morning, throng the rivers, canals, and ponds and take a ritual dip every year on this occasion. In Dogra households, a Puja is performed afterwards and part of food crop is offered to the deities. New fruit of the year is enjoyed on this day. A Ritual Bath at Tawi river during Vaisakhi is common in Jammu.

Vaisakhi is celebrated at Udhampur on the bank of Devika river where for three days devotees enjoy the folk songs. At Sudhmahadev, this festival is celebrated with great pomp and show where folk singers come down and a competition of folk songs is held. Vendors generally install their shops and stalls of eatables.

Many people go to the Nagbani temple to witness the grand New Year celebration. Vaisakhi is also considered "harvest festival" and considered auspicious, especially for marriages. Celebrations of Vaisakhi also include Dogri Bhangra. According to Ganhar (1975), "Bhangra dances are a special feature of Baisakhi celebrations but bhangra is an importation from the Punjab and is more secular than religious".

The occasion is marked by numerous fairs and people come by the thousands to celebrate Vaisakhi. For example, Airwan in Kathua is known for Vaisakhi fair attended by 10,000 people as per Census 1961. Every year on Baisakhi festival around 15,000 pilgrims pay their obeisance at 700 tear old temple of Subar Nag Devta temple in Bhaderwah. Other places where Vaisakhi fairs are held are Doda Bridge and Ramban.

==== Himachal Pradesh ====
In Himachal Pradesh, Vaisakhi is an important festival of Hindus. People get up early in the morning and have a ritual bath. Two earthen lamps are lighted on this day one of Sangiya of oil and other one is Jyot of Ghee. These are kept in a large saucer along with water pot, blades of evergreen turf, Kusha, Incense, Sandal, Vermillion and Dakshina (money). With these things worship of household deities is performed. Alms are given in form of rice and pulses with small coins which are placed near Deity. This is called Nasrawan and is commonly to family priest.

Fried cakes of black gram which are prepared a day before are distributed to neighbours after Puja is completed. Special dishes are prepared on this day. White washing is performed on this day and floors are plastered. This is called Prau lagana. In the evening people enjoy fairs which are organised for three days.

==== Haryana ====
Vaisakhi is celebrated with religious fervour in Yamunanagar and Kurukshetra. In Kurukshetra district, Vaisakhi fair is held at Baan Ganga Tirtha, which is associated with Arjuna of Mahabharata. There is a Vaisakhi tradition of ritual bath at the sacred tank of Baan Ganga Tirtha in Village Dayalpur of Kurukshetra. A fair is held annually on Vaisakhi at this Hindu pilgrimage. Besides, Haryana government organizes a Vaisakhi festival in Pinjore Garden to commemorate this religious and cultural festival.

==== Uttar Pradesh ====
Vaisakhi or Vaisakhi Sankranti is celebrated on first day of Vaisakha, as per Hindu Solar Calendar. This day is also known as Sattuā or Satwahi, as Sattu is donated and consumed on this day. The common rites during this festival is bath in a river or pond and to eat Sattu and Gur (Jaggery).

=== Other regional Hindu solar New Years ===
Vaisakhi coincides with the first day of the solar cycle year, that is the solar New Year or Mesha Sankranti which is also related to other regional new years such as 'Vishu' and 'Puthandu' celebrated in Kerala and Tamil Nadu a day after Vaisakhi. The festivities include fireworks, shopping for new clothes, and interesting displays called 'Vishu Kani'. Hindus make arrangements of flowers, grains, fruits that friends and family visit to admire as "lucky sight" (Vishukkani). Giving gifts to friends and loved ones, as well as alms to the needy, are a tradition of Kerala Hindus on this festive day. Vaisakhi is also related to Bohag (Rongali) Bihu in Assam and as Pohela Boishakh in Bengal, but typically one or two days after Vaisakhi.

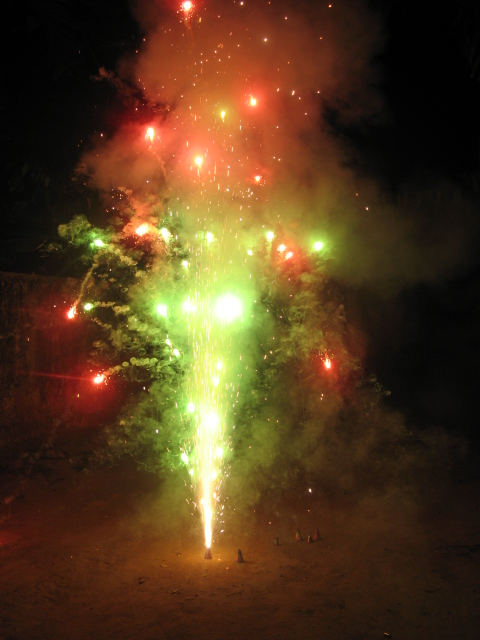
Some Indians mark their traditional new year with fireworks

The following is a list of new year festivals:

- Bohag Bihu in Assam, India
- Pohela Boishakh in West Bengal, India and Bangladesh
- Pana Sankranti (Maha Vishuba Sankranti) in Odisha, India
- Jur Sital in Mithila (Bihar, India and parts of Nepal)
- Bwisagu in Bodoland region of Assam, India
- Bisu in Tulu Nadu region of Karnataka, India
- Puthandu in Tamil Nadu, India and parts of Sri Lanka
- Vishu in Kerala, India

==== Vishu ====
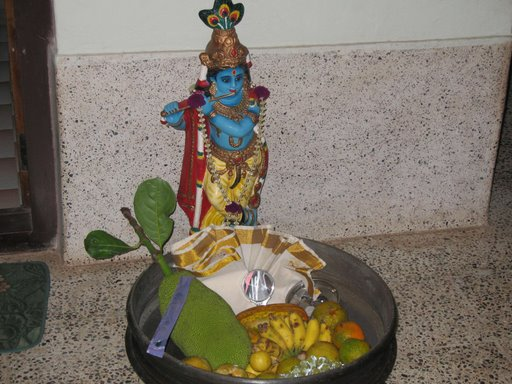
A Vishukkani tray before Krishna (Vishnu), a Kerala Hindu tradition

Vishu is a Hindu festival celebrated on the same day as Vaisakhi in the Indian state of Kerala, and falls on the first day of Malayalam calendar month called Medam. The festival is notable for its solemnity and the general lack of pomp and show that characterize other Hindu festivals of Kerala such as Onam.

The festival is marked by family time, preparing colorful auspicious items and viewing these as the first thing on the Vishu day. In particular, Malayali Hindus seek to view the golden blossoms of the Indian laburnum (Kani Konna), money or silver items (Vishukkaineetam), and rice. The day also attracts firework play by children, wearing new clothes (Puthukodi) and the eating a special meal called Sadya, which is a mix of salty, sweet, sour and bitter items. The Vishu arrangement typically includes an image of Vishnu, typically as Krishna. People also visit temples on the day.

==== Bohag Bihu ====
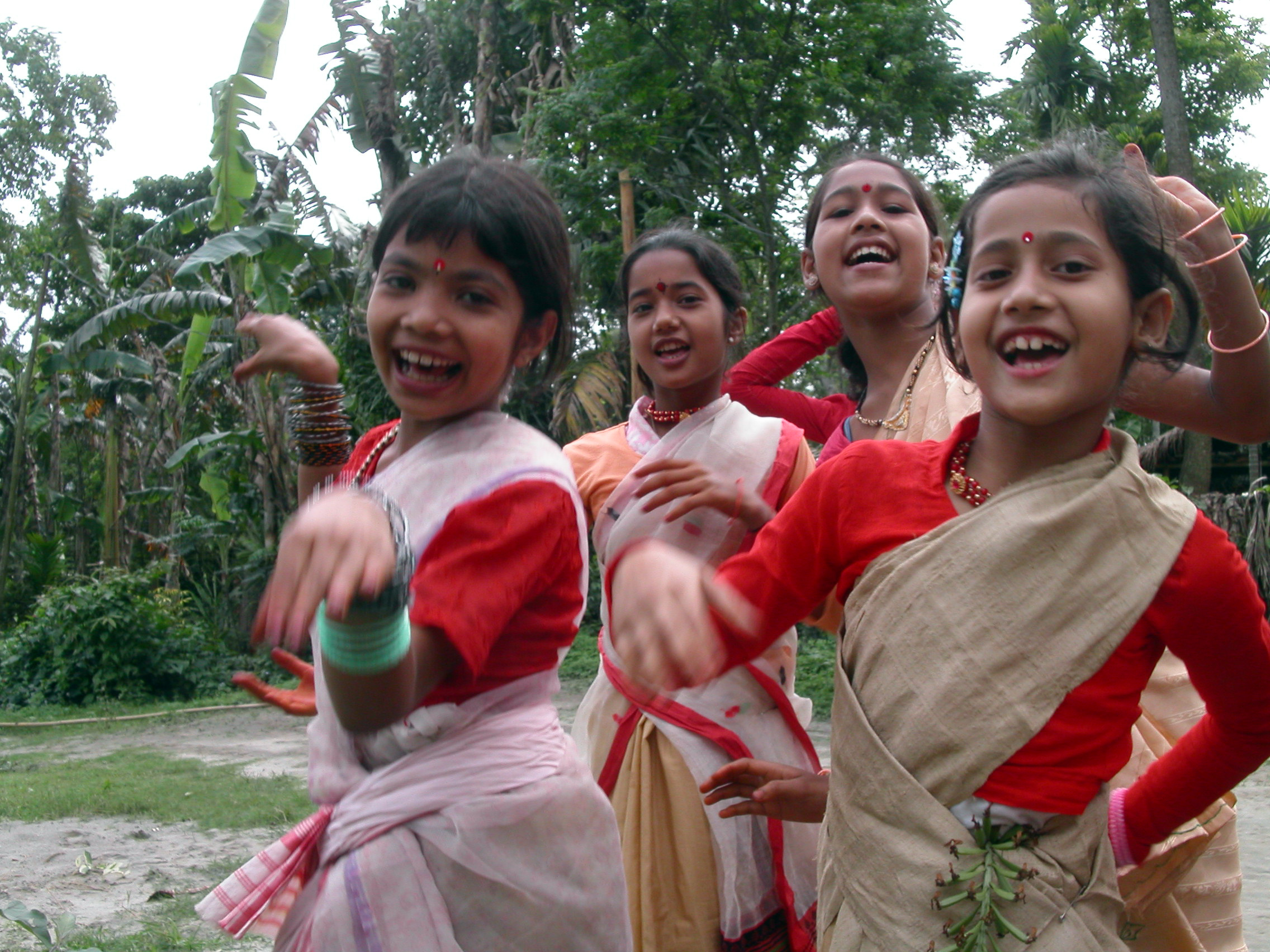
Celebrating Bohag Bihu in Assam

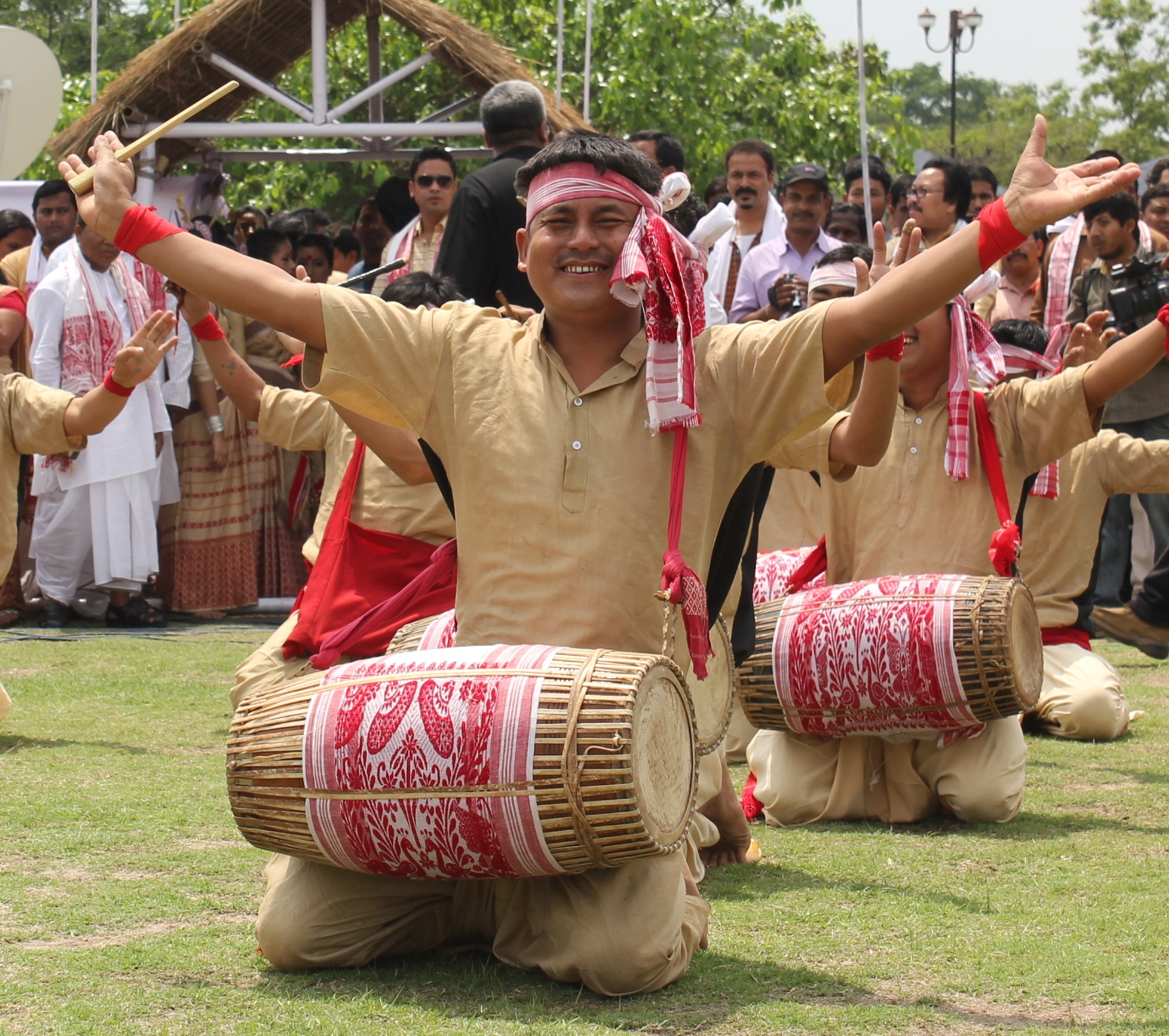
Festive Bihu with Dhuliya is an Assamese Hindu tradition on this day.

Bohag Bihu or Rangali Bihu marks the beginning of the Assamese New Year on 13 April. It is celebrated for seven days Vishuva Sankranti (Mesha Sankranti) of the month of Vaisakh or locally 'Bohag' (Bhaskar Calendar). The three primary types of Bihu are Rongali Bihu, Kongali Bihu, and Bhogali Bihu. Each festival historically recognizes a different agricultural cycle of the paddy crops. During Rangali Bihu there are 7 pinnacle phases: 'Chot', 'Raati', 'Goru', 'Manuh', 'Kutum', 'Mela' and 'Chera'.

==== Maha Vishuba Sankranti ====
Pana Sankranti (ପଣା ସଂକ୍ରାନ୍ତି) also known as Maha Vishuba Sankranti marks the Odia new year in Odisha. Celebrations include various types of folk and classical dances, such as the Shiva-related Chhau dance. On this day people hang pieces of Neem branches with leaves in front of their houses believed to have health benefits. They prepare a liquid mixture of jaggery, mango, pepper and other ingredients which is called Pana (ପଣା). An earthen pot with a small hole and a grass (କୁୁଶ) within the hole at the bottom is hung over the Tulasi (ତୁୁୁଳସୀ ଚଉରା). The pot is filled with water daily which acts as a drip to protect the sacred plant from the summer heat.

==== Pohela Boishakh ====
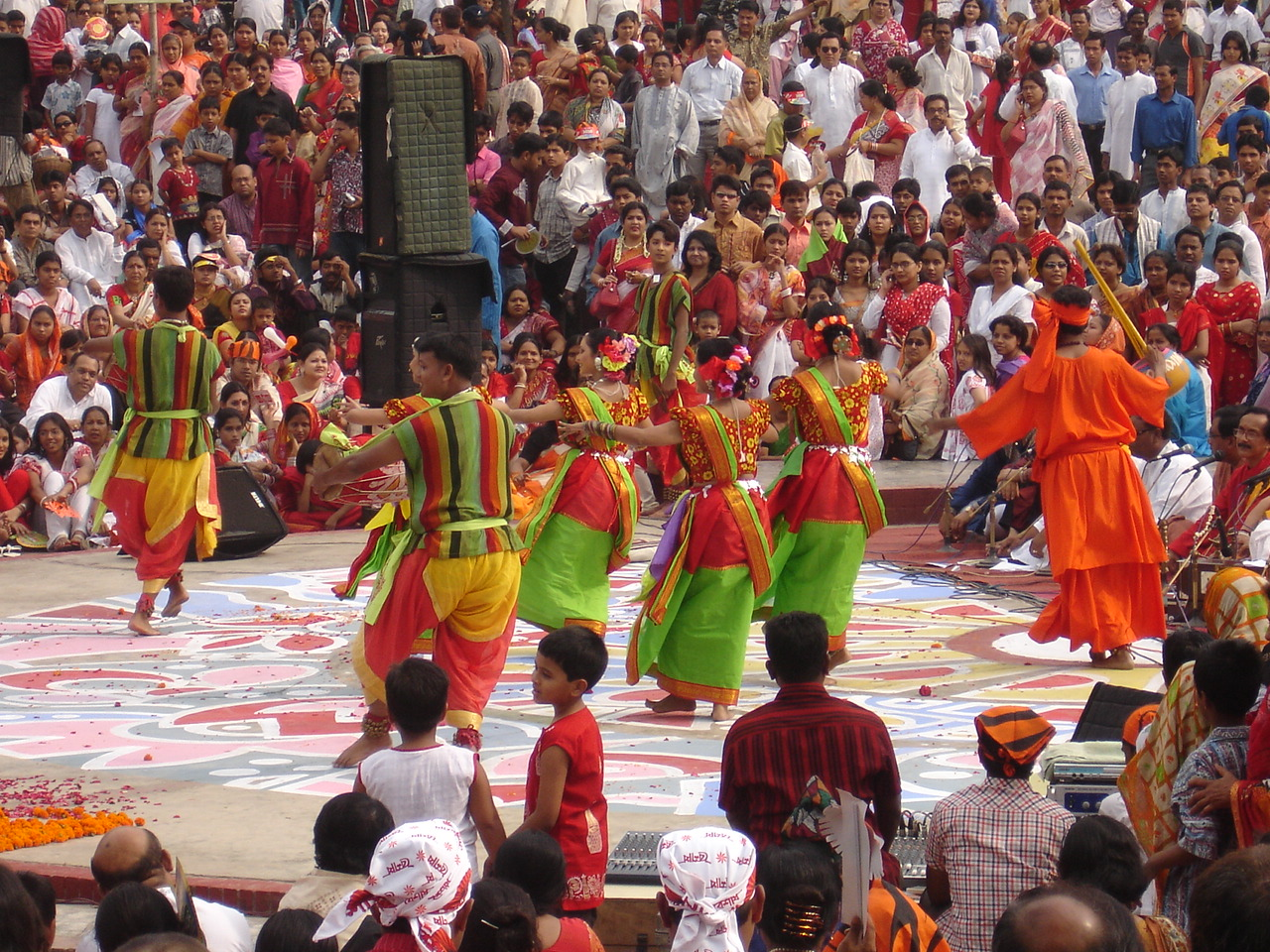
Pohela Boishakh celebrations in Dhaka, Bangladesh.

Pohela Boishakh is the first day of the Bengali calendar and is celebrated on 14 April every year in the states of West Bengal, Tripura, Jharkhand and Assam (Barak Valley) by Bengali Hindus.

Some historians attribute the Bengali calendar to the 7th-century king Shashanka. The term Bangabda (Bangla year) is found too in two Shiva temples many centuries older than Akbar era, suggesting that Bengali calendar existed before Akbar's time. Various dynasties whose territories extended into Bengal, prior to the 13th-century, used the Vikram Samvat. Buddhist texts and inscriptions created in the Pala Empire era mention "Vikrama" and the months such as Ashvin, a system found in Sanskrit texts elsewhere in ancient and medieval Indian subcontinent.

==== Puthandu ====
Puthandu, also known as Puthuvarusham or Tamil New Year, is the first day of the month Chithirai on the Tamil calendar. On this day, Tamil people greet each other by saying "Puttāṇṭu vāḻttukkaḷ!" or "Iṉiya puttāṇṭu nalvāḻttukkaḷ!", which is equivalent to "Happy New Year". The day is observed as a family time. Households clean up the house, prepare a tray with fruits, flowers and auspicious items, light up the family Puja altar and visit their local temples. People wear new clothes and youngsters go to elders to pay respects and seek their blessings, then the family sits down to a vegetarian feast.

==== Jur Sital in Bihar ====
In the Mithila region of Bihar and Nepal, the new year is celebrated as Jur Sital. It is traditional to use lotus leaves to serve sattu (powdered meal derived from grains of red gram and jau (Hordeum vulgare) and other ingredients) to the family members.

=== Hindu celebrations elsewhere ===
==== Pakistan ====
Vaisakhi is an important among Pakistani Hindus. In Undivided Punjab, the Hindu Shrine of Katas Raj was known for its Vaisakhi fair. It was attended by around 10,000 pilgrims who were mostly Hindus. Similarly, at the shrine of Bairagi Baba Ram Thaman, a Vaisakhi fair was held annually since 16th century CE which was attended by around 60,000 Hindu pilgrims and Bairagi saints from all over India used to throng the shrine. The 1961 Muzaffargarh District Census Report claims that Vaisakhi is associated with bullock racing and is a common festivity among the cultivators.

==== Nepal ====
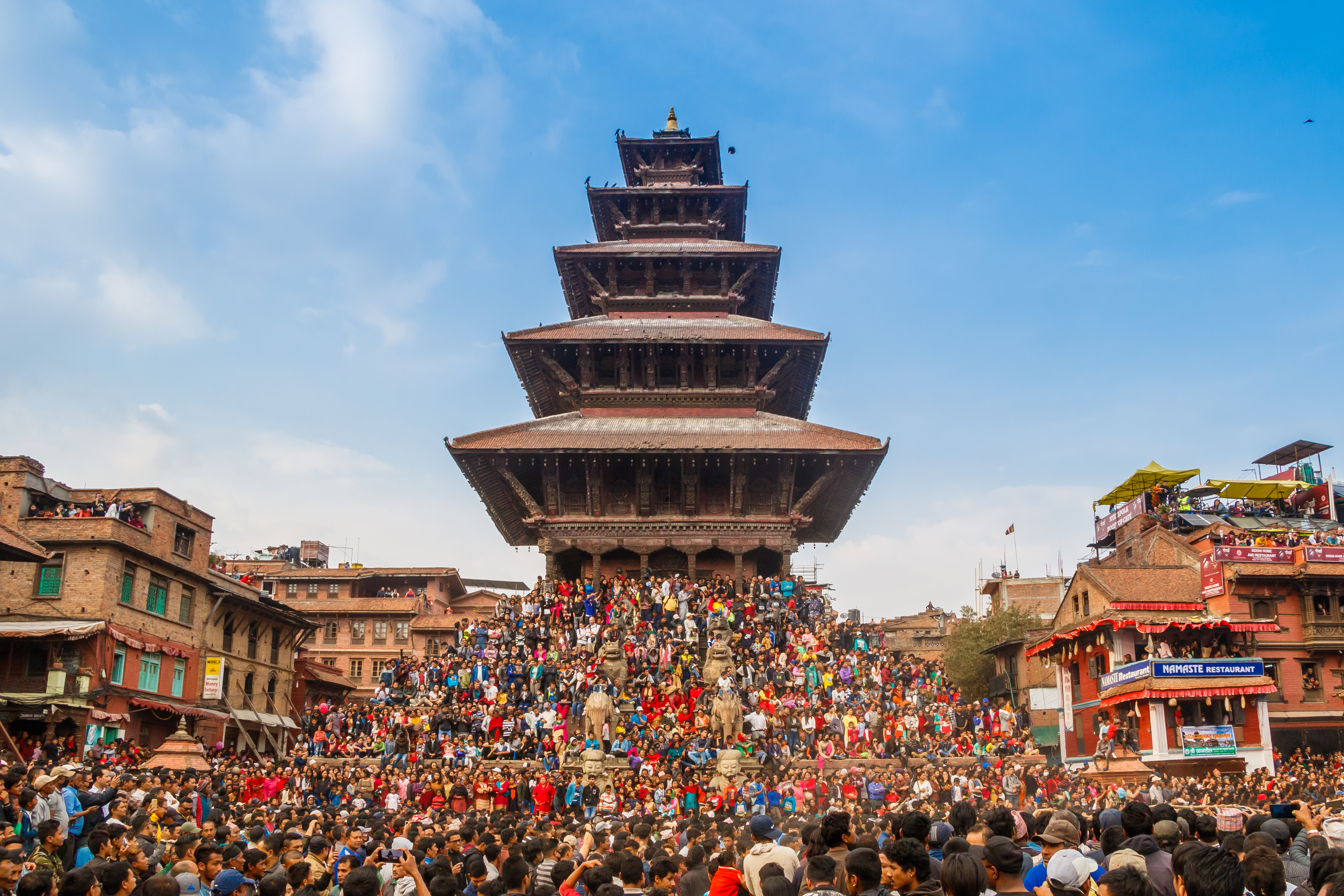
Bisket Jatra, Bhaktapur, Nepal

Baisakhi is celebrated as Nepalese New Year because it is the day which marks the Hindu Solar New Year as per Bikram Sambat, the Hindu Solar Calendar. Vaisakha is the first month in Nepalese Calendar. The idols of Goddess Thimi Kumari are carried out in palanquins and are taken around the city.

==== United States ====
Vaisakhi is celebrated by Hindu community and Indian & Nepalese diaspora in United States of America. Every year Nepalese Hindus gather up in traditional outsfits like kurtis and Nepalese caps to observe the Hindu Solar New Year. The Bengali Hindu Community also celebrates its new year 'Pohela Baisakh' on this day. A Baisakhi Mela or fair is also held where Bengali handicrafts sessions are held. The Bay Area Malayalee Association holds Vishu celebration (Kerala New Year). Event includes Sadhya (Kerala-style feast) and cultural, cinematics and comedy programs, and end with a tea social. Tamil Community also celebrates New Year on this day as Puthandu.

== Sikhism ==
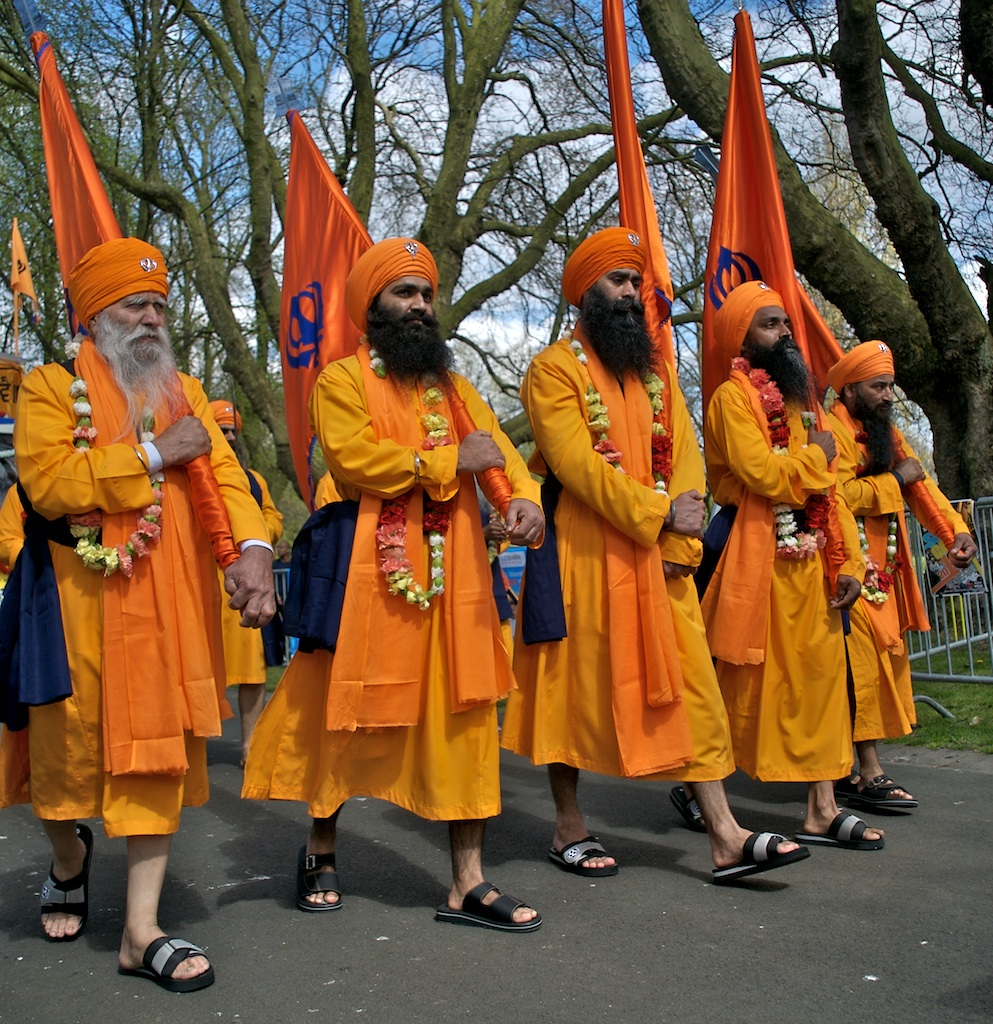
Sikh procession in Birmingham, England

Vaisakhi (Punjabi: ਵੈਸਾਖੀ, vaisākhī, is also known as Baisākhī) is a very important day for Sikhs and one of the most colourful events in the Sikh calendar. It occurs during mid-April every year and traditionally in Punjab, the festival corresponds with the first harvesting of the crops for the year. Historically, the festival has been a very joyous occasion and a time for celebration. However, since 1699, it has marked the very significant religious event of the creation of the Khalsa Panth. The Sikh celebration of Vaisakhi is known as Khalsa Sajna Diwas, commemorating the anniversary of the founding of the Khalsa Panth. According to Ravneet Kaur, Baisakhi is the harvest festival whilst Khalsa Sajna Diwas is the Khalsa anniversary celebration, coinciding on the same day. Vaisakhi traditionally celebrated the harvest of rabi crops (wheat and barley), with Guru Gobind Singh establishing the Khalsa Panth on the day the harvest festival was celebrated, thus Vaisakhi and Khalsa Sajna Diwas are observed together.

Vaisakhi falls on the first day of the Vaisakh month and marks the sun's entry to the Mesha Rasi (Mesha Sankranti) marking the solar transition to Aries. The day is also described as a sacred festival for Sikhs in India as it marks the birth of the Khalsa.

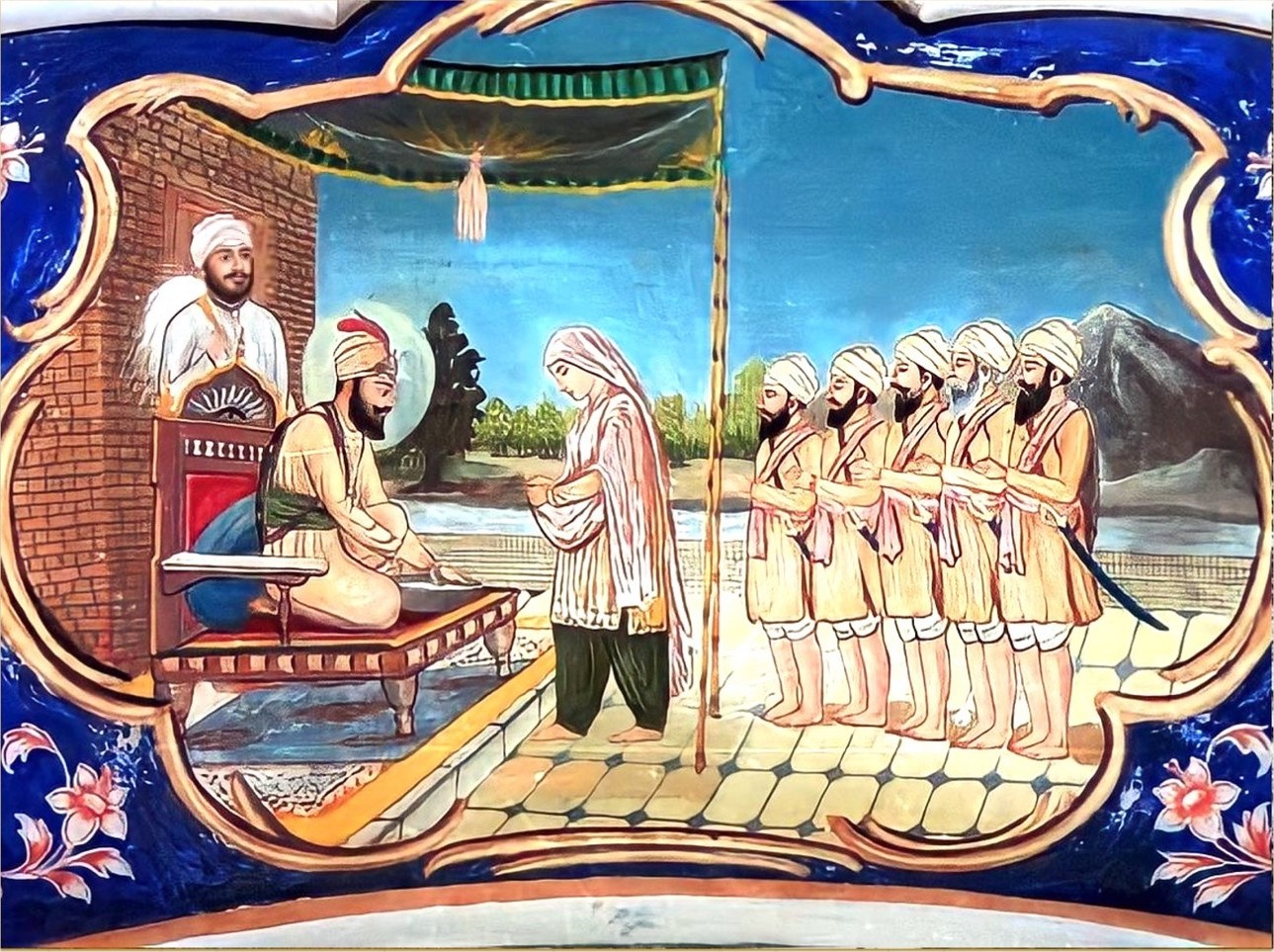
Sikh fresco art depicting the creation of the Khalsa in Anandpur 1699 on Vaisakhi

The significance of Vaisakhi as a Sikh religious festival started after the execution of Guru Tegh Bahadur for refusing to convert to Islam under the orders of the Mughal Emperor Aurangzeb. This triggered the ascension of Guru Gobind Singh, the tenth Guru of Sikhism, who subsequently inaugurated the Khalsa on Vaisakhi of 1699. The increased persecution of Sikhs by Mughal authorities followed a period of increasing strength of the Sikh movement in the Malwa region of Punjab during the period of Guru Tegh Bahadur, which would lead to his execution and the resulting foundation of the Khalsa by Guru Gobind Singh, to defend religious freedoms. This gave Vaisakhi the added dimension of being observed as a celebration of the formation of the Khalsa, and is also known as Khalsa Sirjana Divas or Khalsa Sajna Divas. The Birth of the Khalsa Panth was on 30 March 1699. However, many historical Sikh sources place the events of Vaisakhi as spanning over multiple days.

Later, Ranjit Singh was proclaimed as Maharaja of the Sikh Empire on 12 April 1801 (to coincide with Vaisakhi), creating a unified political state, with Sahib Singh Bedi, a descendant of Guru Nanak, conducting the coronation.

Vaisakhi is celebrated in much the same way as Gurpurab, or a Guru's birthday anniversary, with gurdwaras being decorated and attended by Sikhs who listen to kirtan and religious discourses there. Many Sikhs also choose to be inducted into the Khalsa order on this day. After the prayers, karah parshad is then served to the congregation, and the function ends with a langar, or community lunch. The festival is marked with a nagar kirtan street procession headed by a group of Panj Pyare representatives, and music, singing, and chanting scriptures are part of the celebration. Sikhs perform gidda and bhangra dances on the occasion of Vaisakhi. They also visit gurdwaras and take a dip in rivers.

=== In India ===
==== Punjab, India ====
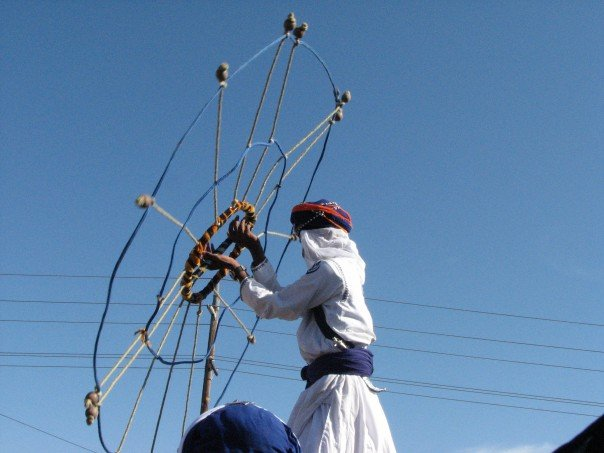
Gatka

Fairs and melas are held in many places in Punjab to celebrate the formation of the Khalsa. According to Dogra and Dogra (2003), "an annual fair is held at Takht Kesgarh Sahib on Baisakhi day". A procession is lead through the city of Anandpur to mark the occasion. Other important places where large gatherings take place are Harmandar Sahib, Amritsar and Takht Sri Damdama Sahib, Talwandi Sabo. A special celebration takes place at Talwandi Sabo (where Guru Gobind Singh stayed for nine months and completed the recompilation of the Guru Granth Sahib), in the Gurudwara at Anandpur Sahib the birthplace of the Khalsa, and at the Golden Temple in Amritsar.

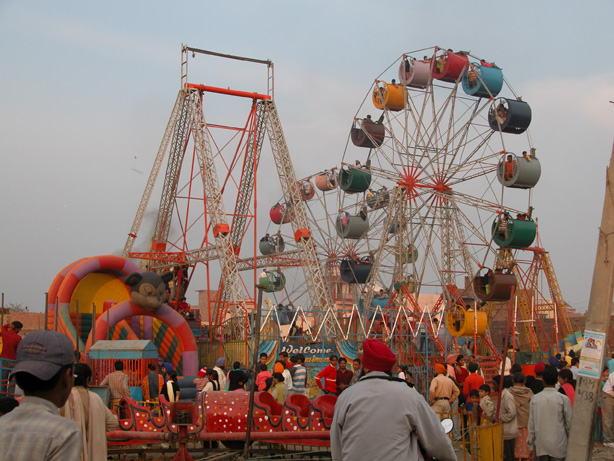
Vaisakhi mela

Vaisakhi is a harvest festival for people of Northern India. Chander and Dogra (2003) state that in Punjab, Vaisakhi marks the ripening of the rabi harvest. According to Dhillon (2015), in Punjab, this day is observed as a thanksgiving day by farmers whereby farmers pay their tribute, thanking God for the abundant harvest and also praying for future prosperity. The harvest festival is celebrated by Hindus and Sikhs. In the Punjab, historically, during the early 20th century, Vaisakhi was a sacred day for Hindus and Sikhs and a secular festival for all Muslims and Christians. In modern times, sometimes Christians in Punjab participate in Baisakhi celebrations along with Hindus and Sikhs. The harvest festival is also characterized by the folk dance, Bhangra which traditionally is a harvest dance.

Aawat pauni is a tradition associated with harvesting in the Punjab, which involves people getting together to harvest the wheat.

==== Himachal Pradesh ====
A large number of Sikhs visit Paonta Sahib on the festival of Vaisakhi. According to Sahi (1999), Paonta Sahib "was the abode of Guru Gobind Singh Ji for a couple of years." Paonta Sahib Gurdwara is in Sirmaur district in Himachal Pradesh. The site is located near the river Yamuna. The tricentenary celebrations to mark the birth of the Khalsa were started from Paanta Sahib Gurdwara in 1999.

==== Jammu ====
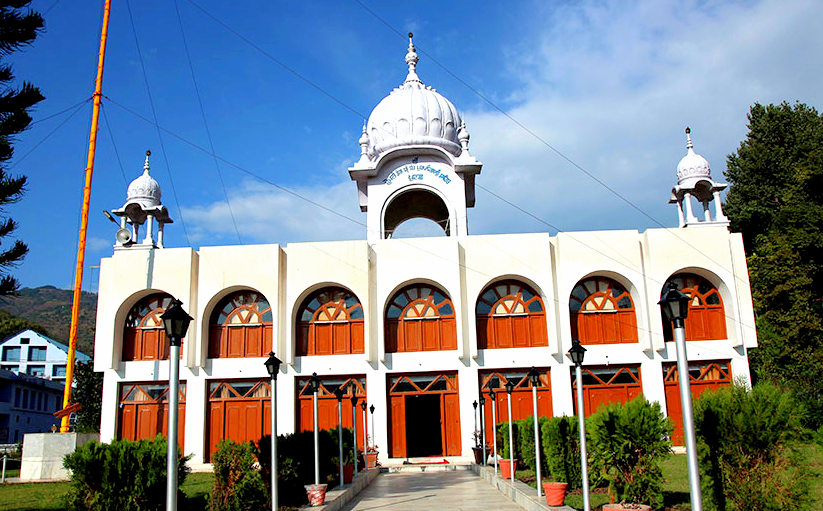
Nangali Sahib

Gurdwara Dera Nangali Sahib in Jammu was established in 1803. The Gurdwara is situated in the Poonch district of Jammu. An annual gathering takes place at the gurdwara on the on Baisakhi when many people participate in the day-long function of Baisakhi. Dera Nangali Sahib is known as a centre for Sikhism in Jammu. The other important gurdwara is the Dera Baba Banda which is dedicated to Banda Bahadur. The gurdwara is located near Reasi. Baisakhi celebrations take place at this Dera.

==== Kashmir ====
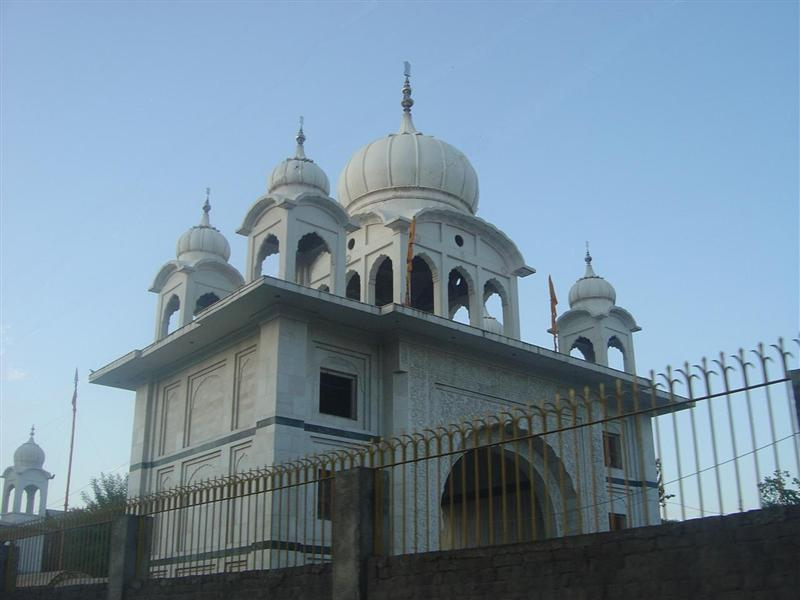
Gurdwara Chatti Patshahi

Sikhs in Kashmir celebrate Vaisakhi as a religious festival to mark the foundation of the Khalsa. Unlike in the North Indian plains where Vaisalhi is also associated with harvesting, Sikhs in Kashmir mark the day when Guru Gobind Singh baptised the Panj Pyare. Bajan Keertans are held in all gurdwaras in Kashmir. However, the main celebration takes place at Chatti Pathshahi Gurdwara in Rainawari. Sikhs will visit friends and family in Vaisakhi. People will wear special clothes and prepare special food to mark the festival. Sikhs will also visit the gardens and markets. The mode of celebration is believed to be different to the way the festival is celebrated elsewhere.

=== Nihang ===
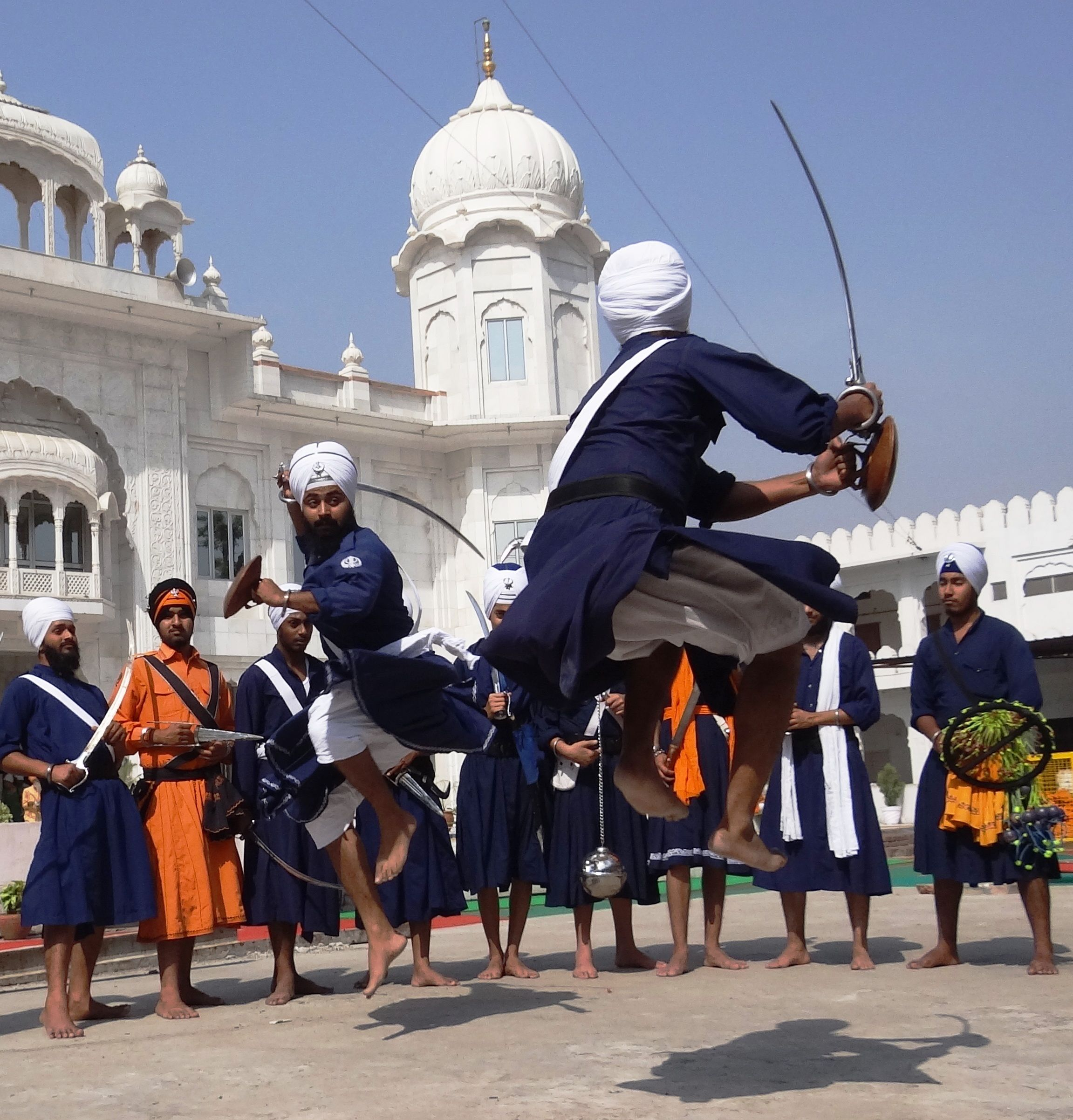
Gatka by Nihangs

The Nihang (Punjabi: ਨਿਹੰਗ) or Akali (lit. 'the immortals') is an armed Sikh warrior order originating in the Indian subcontinent. Nihang are believed to have originated either from Fateh Singh and the attire he wore or from the "Akali Dal" (lit. Army of the Immortal) started by Guru Hargobind. Early Sikh military history was dominated by the Nihang, known for their victories where they were heavily outnumbered. Traditionally known for their bravery and ruthlessness in the battlefield, the Nihang once formed the irregular guerrilla squads of the armed forces of the Sikh Empire, the Sikh Khalsa Army.

Nihangs mark Vaisakhi in their own unique manner. They will engage in martial arts and participate in Gatkas. They will also exhibit displays of horsemanship. According to Singh and Fenech (2014), Nihangs will move to the city of Amritsar on Vaisakhi day.

=== Sikh celebrations outside India ===
Celebration around the world

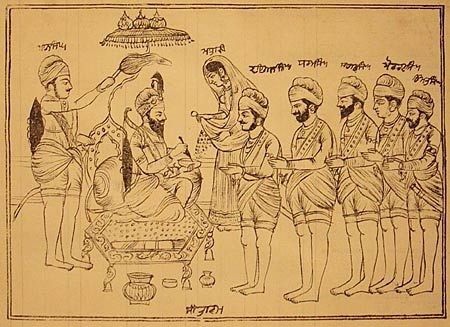
A depiction of Guru Gobind Singh initiating the first five members of the Khalsa

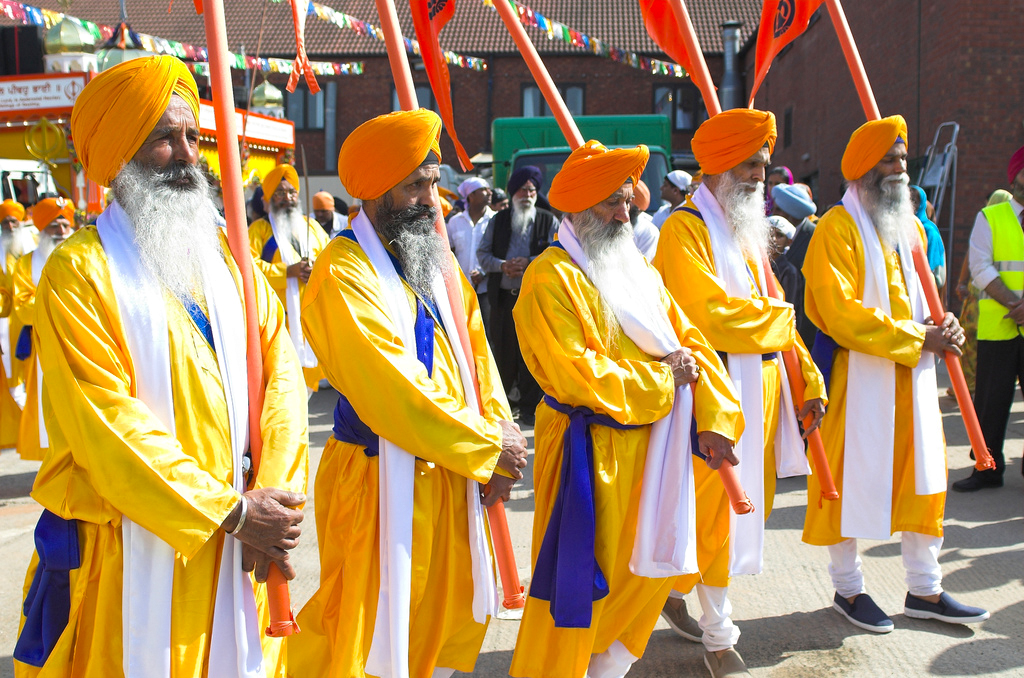
The Panj Pyare at Vaisakhi 2007 Wolverhampton, UK

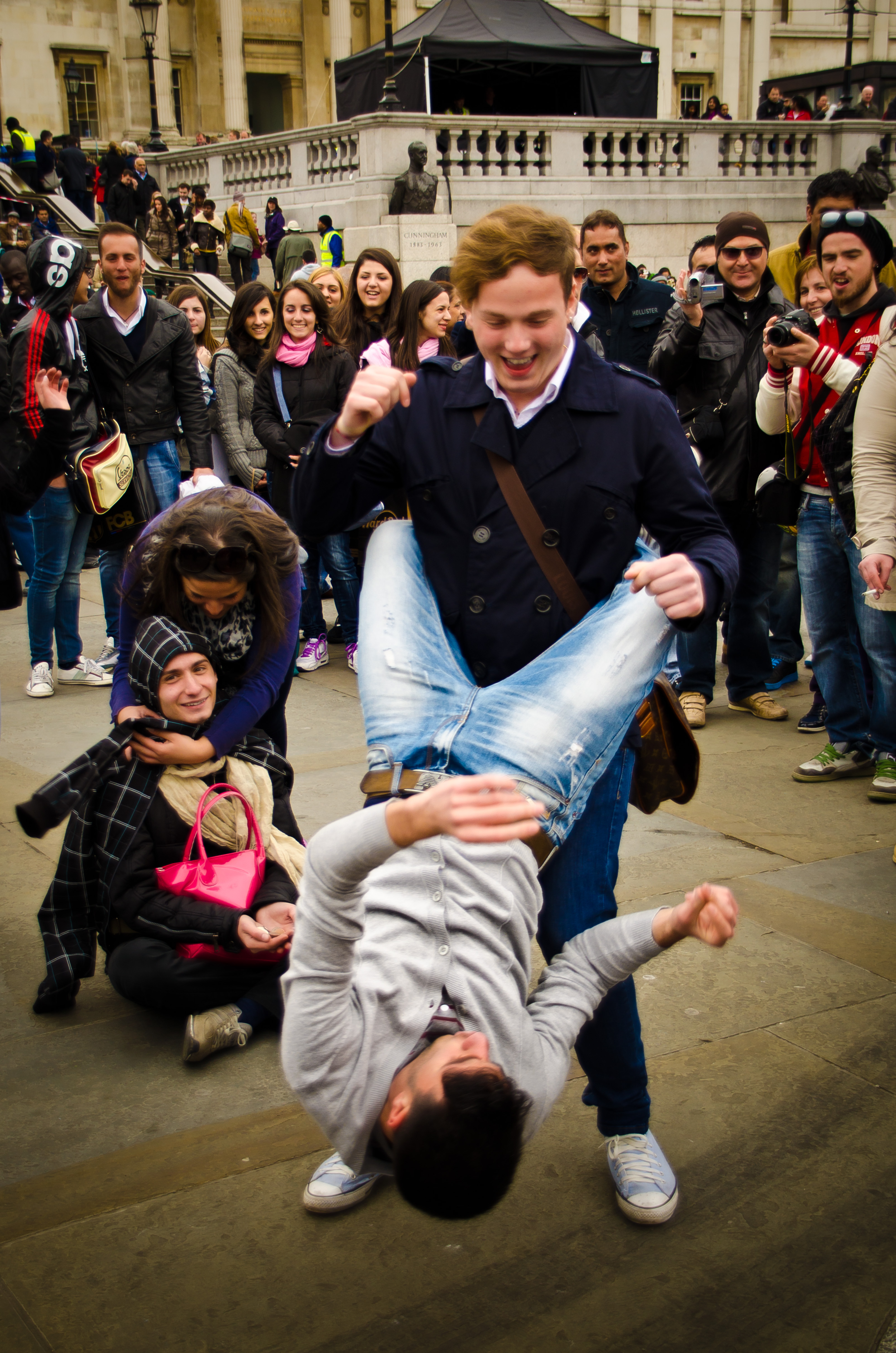
Vaisakhi at Trafalgar Square, London

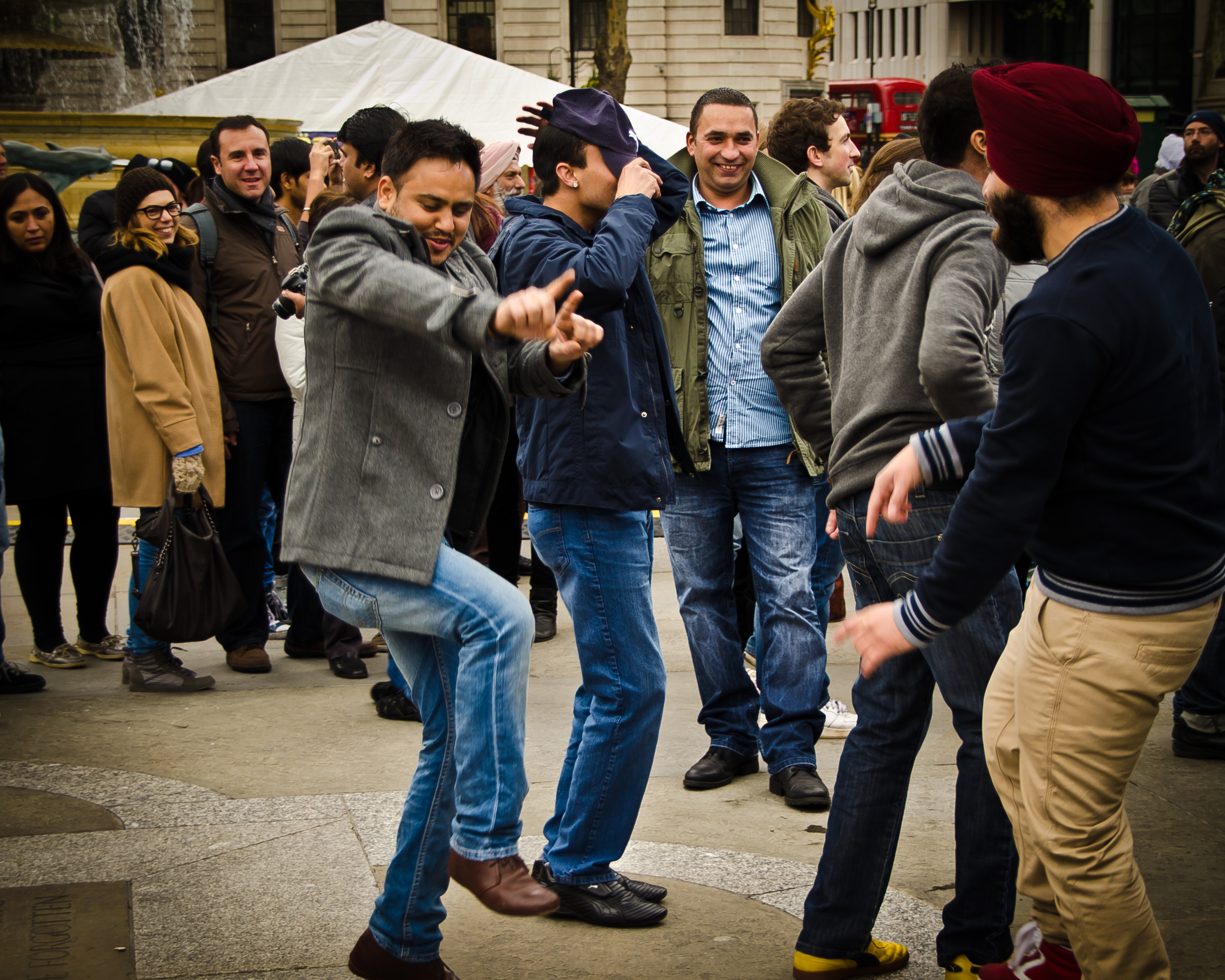
Vaisakhi 2012 at Trafalgar Square, London

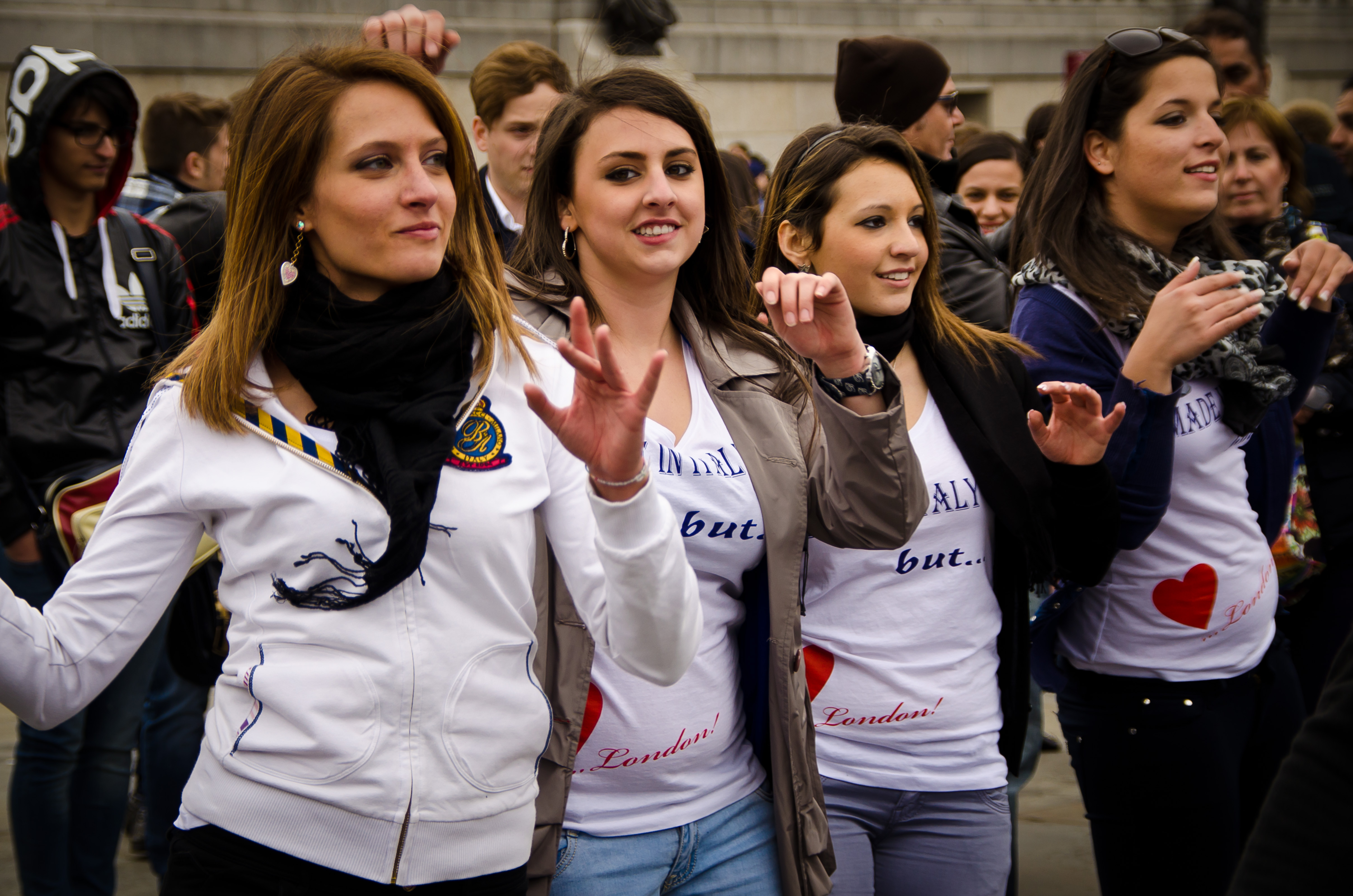
Vaisakhi 2012 at Trafalgar Square, London

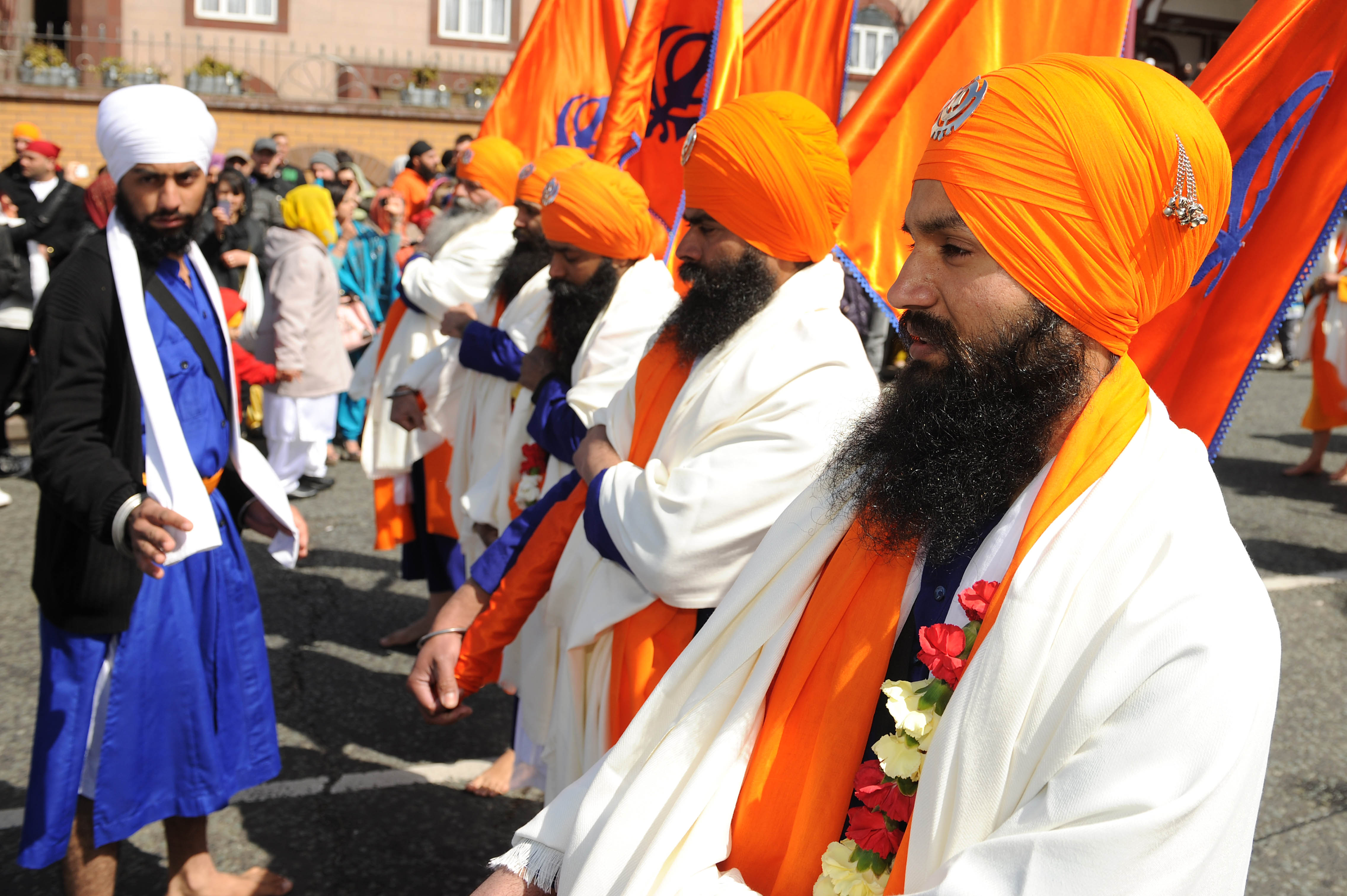
Vaisakhi celebrations in Birmingham

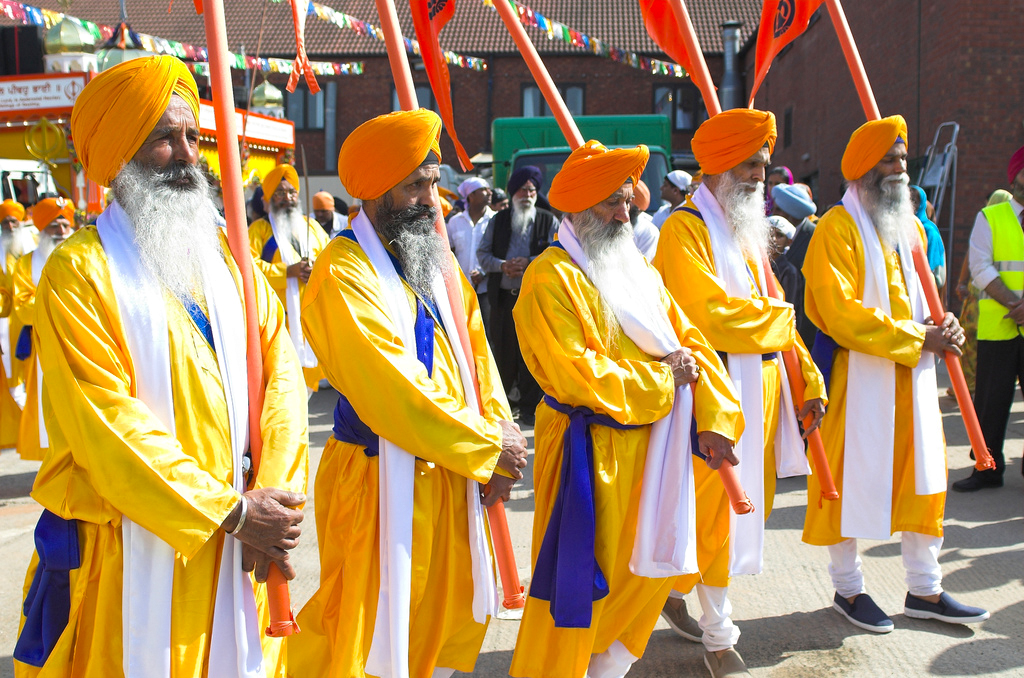
The Panj Pyare at Vaisakhi 2007 Wolverhampton, UK

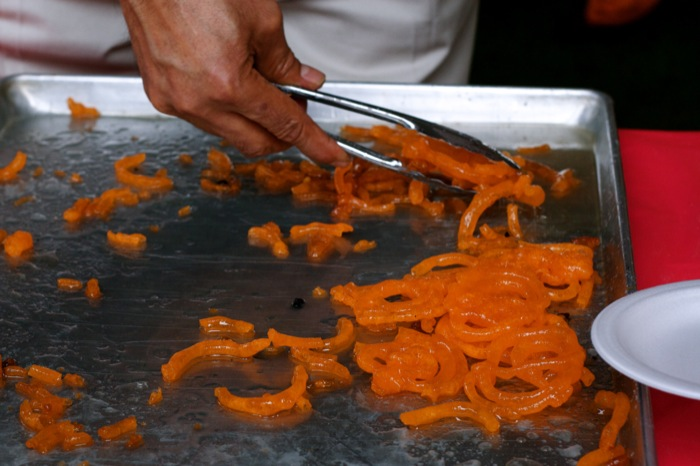
Jalebiyan being served at Vaisakhi Day, 11 April 2009, Vancouver Canada

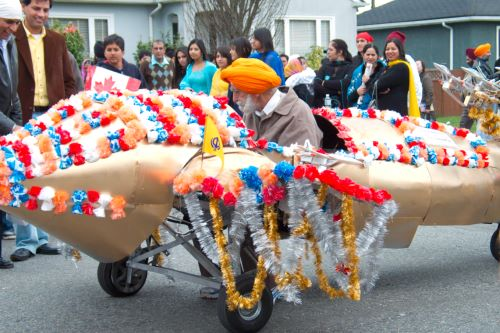
2009 Vancouver Sikh Vaisakhi parade

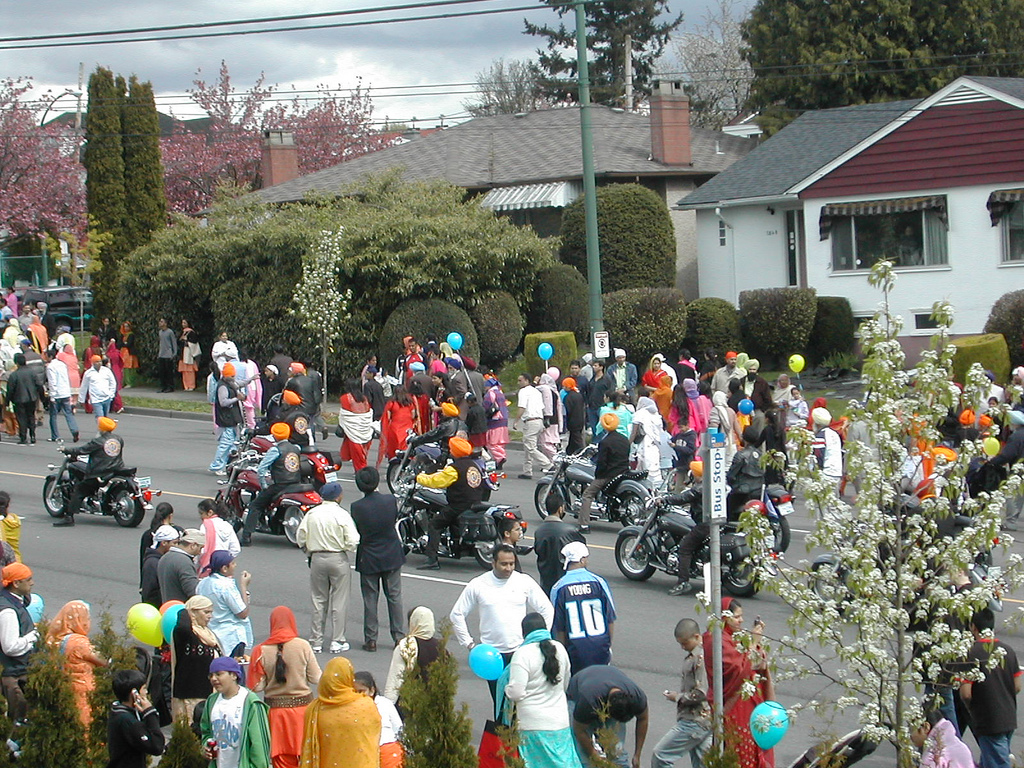
Sikh Motorcycle Club at Vaisakhi 2007 Vancouver, British Columbia, Canada

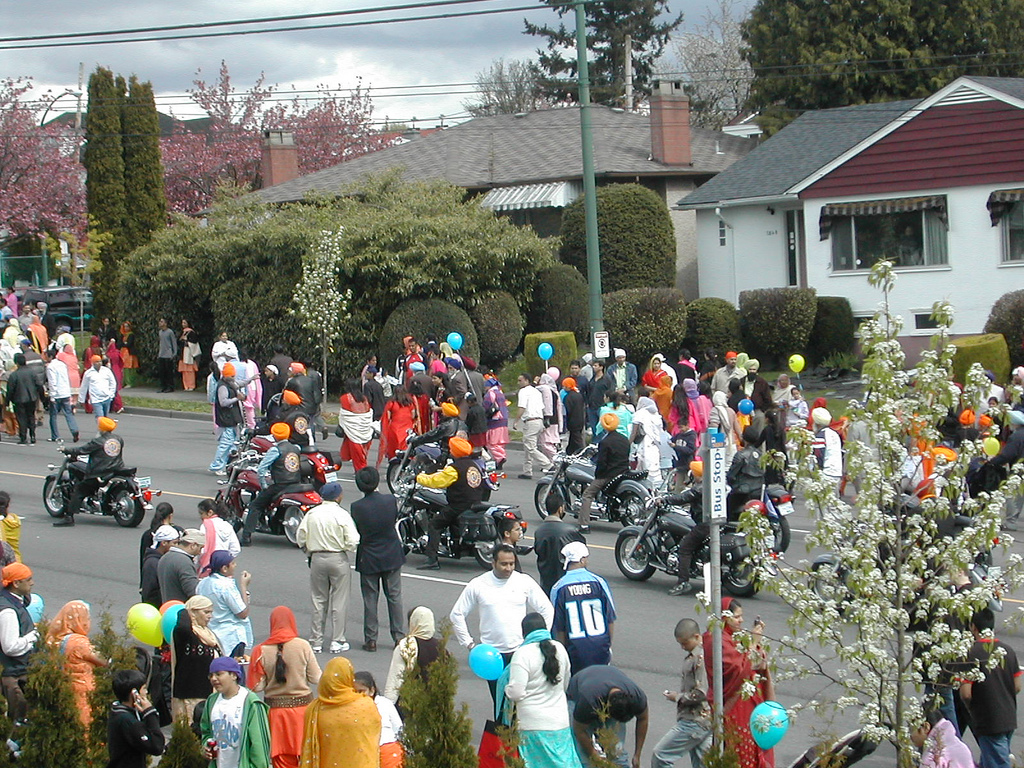
Sikh Motorcycle Club at Vaisakhi 2007 Vancouver, British Columbia, Canada

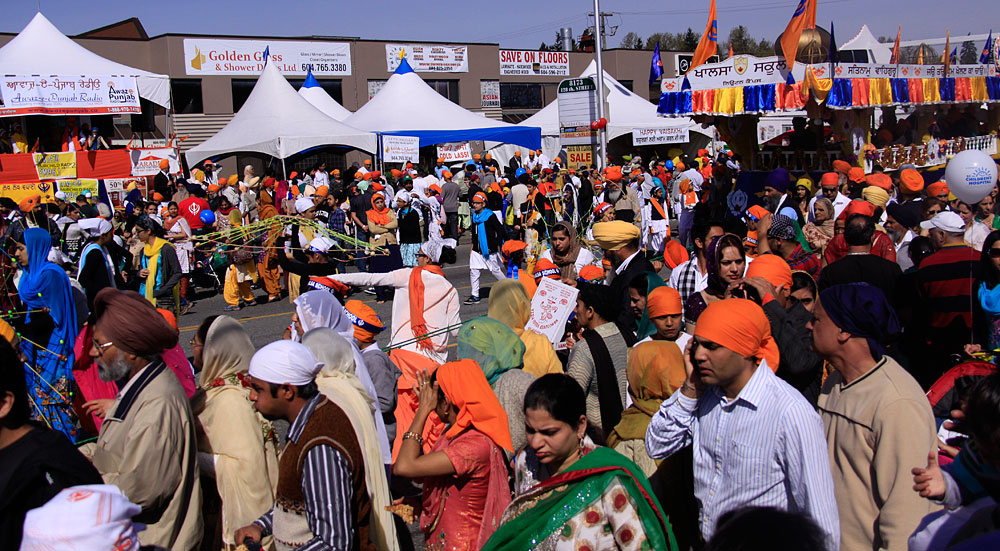
2012 Vaisakhi festival in Surrey, British Columbia, Canada

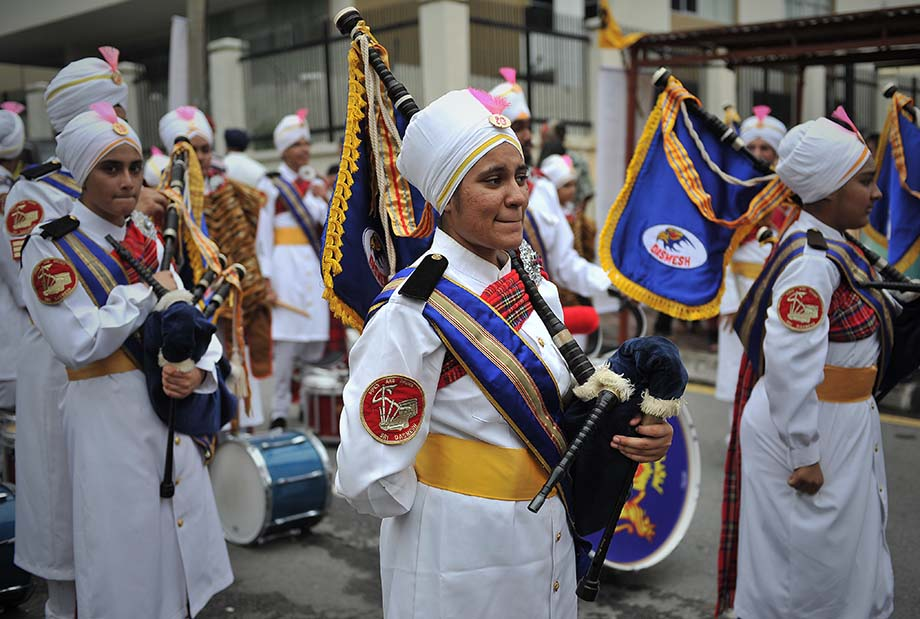
A band performs at Vaisakhi day celebrations in Kuala Lumpur (2013)

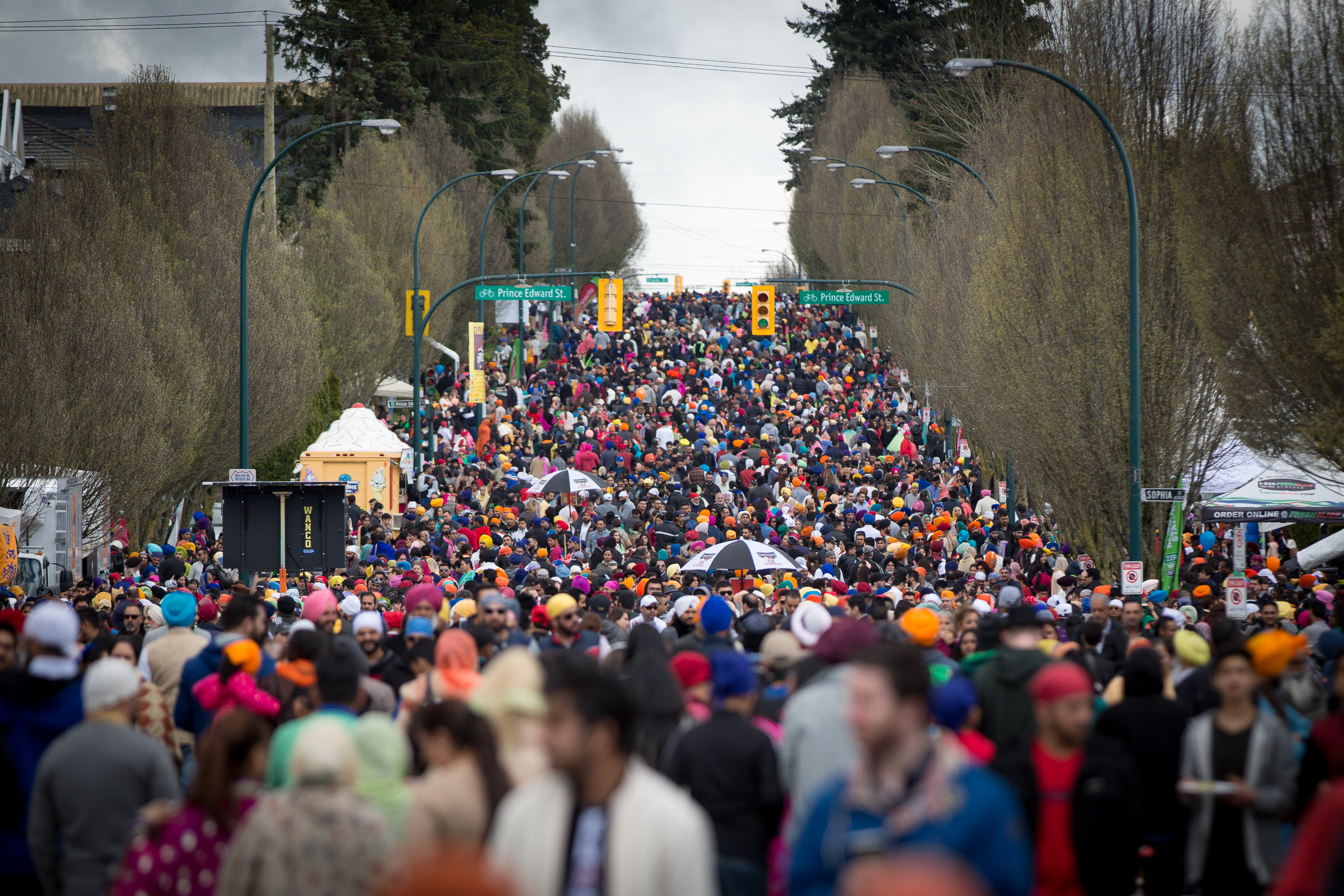
Vaisakhi 2017, Punjabi Market, Vancouver

==== Pakistan ====
Pakistan has many sites that are of historic importance to the Sikh faith, such as the birthplace of Guru Nanak. These sites attract pilgrims from India and abroad every year on Vaisakhi. Pakistan used to have many more Sikhs, but a vast majority moved to India during the 1947 India-Pakistan partition. Contemporary Pakistan has about 20,000 Sikhs in a total population of about 200 million Pakistanis, or about 0.01%. These Sikhs, and thousands more who arrive from other parts of the world for pilgrimage, observe Vaisakhi in Western Punjab (Pakistan) with festivities centered on the Panja Sahib complex in Hasan Abdal, Gurudwaras in Nankana Sahib, and in various historical sites in Lahore. (Note: On 8 April 2016, Punjabi Parchar at Alhamra (Lahore) organised a show called Visakhi mela, where the speakers pledged to "continue our struggle to keep the Punjabi culture alive" in Pakistan through events such as Visakhi Mela. Elsewhere Besakhi fairs or melas are held in various places including Eminabad and Dera Ghazi Khan.)

Unlike the Indian state of Punjab that recognizes the Vaisakhi Sikh festival as an official holiday, the festival is not an official holiday in Punjab or Sindh provinces of Pakistan as Sikhs constitute a very small number in terms of population. In April 2010, the Federal Ministry of Minorities in Pakistan announced that Baisakhi would be officially recognized as a holiday. The Pakistani government welcomes Sikh pilgrims from India to celebrate Baisakhi within its borders.

==== Canada ====
===== British Columbia =====
In the Province of British Columbia, large, local Sikh communities in the cities of Vancouver, Abbotsford, and Surrey hold their annual Vaisakhi celebrations in April, which include two Nagar Kirtan (parades).

In Vancouver, the parade was first held in 1979 and is the largest annual single-day festival in the city. The parade starts at Ross Street Temple and makes its way through the traditional Punjabi Market in the Sunset neighbourhood of South Vancouver, attracting up to 300,000 people.

One week later, the festival in Surrey is one of the largest such celebrations outside of India, having attracted over 200,000 people in 2014, over 350,000 in 2015, and approached 400,000 in 2016. The 2017 attendance in Surrey reportedly topped 400,000, causing organizers to consider future distribution of the festival over several days and local cities, particularly in areas of economic disadvantage which would benefit from the generous charitable efforts seen during Vaisakhi celebrations. Record attendance was again experienced in April 2018 in the 20th annual Surrey Vaisakhi parade, with the RCMP officially estimating the crowd at over half a million people in a city with a 2016 census population of 517,887. Starting at the Gurdwara Dashmesh Darbar Temple (12885 85th Avenue in Surrey), the parade features a variety of floats, community groups, free food, live music and dancers and performers, and travels along 124th Street, turns left onto 75th Avenue, continues on 76th Avenue, onto 128th Street, then back to the Temple.

Kelowna's annual Vaisakhi parade is held a week after Surrey's parade each year and begins and ends at the Sikh Temple on Rutland Road.

Victoria's all-day Vaisakhi celebration features a parade that begins and ends at Gurdwara Singh Sabha, 470 Cecelia Road. The 2018 celebrations on 29 April would be the first held in Victoria in over 100 years.

===== Ontario =====
In the Province of Ontario, the Toronto Vaisakhi Parade is held in April, starting at the Canadian National Exhibition grounds and traveling east to Toronto City Hall, finishing almost three hours later. Following the parade, dignitaries address the gathering until late afternoon.

In the city of Brampton, the Gurudwara Sikh Sangat temple and Gobind Sarvar Gurmat School hold Vaisakhi cultural events such as yoga, pagh (turban) tying, storytelling, and food fairs.

In the city of Malton, a three-hour Nagar Kirtan parade winds from Morning Star, Goreway, Derry Rd, & Airport Rd to Malton Gurdwara Sahib.

===== Prairies =====
In the Province of Alberta, the Edmonton Vaisakhi parade is held in May and travels between the Gurdwara Singh Sabha (4504 Millwoods Road S) & Gurdwara Millwoods (2606 Millwoods Road E) temples.

In the Province of Saskatchewan, the Saskatoon Vaisakhi parade is held in May, starting and ending at the Gurudwara Sahib Temple at 331 Lowe Road.

===== Atlantic =====
In the Province of Nova Scotia, the Halifax-based Maritime Sikh Society holds Vaisakhi celebrations in April featuring Shabad Kirtan performed by professional ragis (musicians).

==== United Kingdom ====
The United Kingdom has a large Sikh community originating from the Indian sub-continent, East Africa and Afghanistan. The largest concentrations of Sikhs in the UK are to be found in the West Midlands (especially Birmingham and Wolverhampton) and London. The Southall Nagar Kirtan is held on a Sunday a week or two before Vaisakhi. The Birmingham Nagar Kirtan is held in late April in association with Birmingham City Council, and is an annual event attracting thousands of people which commences with two separate nagar kirtans setting off from gurdwaras in the city and culminating in the Vaisakhi Mela at Handsworth Park.

==== United States ====
Amongst Sikh populations in the United States, there is usually a parade commemorating the Vaisakhi celebration. In Manhattan, New York City people come out to do "Seva" (selfless service) such as giving out free food, and completing any other labor that needs to be done. In Los Angeles, California, the local Sikh community consisting of many gurdwaras holds a full day Kirtan (spiritual music) program followed by a parade.

==== Malaysia ====
The Sikh community, a subgroup of the Malaysian Indian ethnic minority race, is an ethnoreligious minority in Malaysia, which is why Vaisakhi is not a public holiday. However, in line with the government's efforts to promote integration among the country's different ethnic and religious groups, the prime minister, Najib Razak has announced that beginning 2013, all government servants from the Sikh Malaysian Indian community will be given a day off on Vaisakhi Day. Vaisakhi 'open houses' are also held across the country during the day of the festival, or the closest weekend to it.

== Buddhism ==
The new year falls on or about the same day every year for many Buddhist communities in parts of South and Southeast Asia. This is likely an influence of their shared culture in the 1st millennium CE. Some examples include:

- Sangken in Arunachal Pradesh and parts of Assam, India
- Aluth Avuruthu in Sri Lanka.
- Chol Chnam Thmey in Cambodia
- Pi Mai in Laos
- Songkran in Thailand
- Thingyan in Myanmar
- Water-Sprinkling Festival, celebrated by the Dai people in Sipsongpanna in Yunnan, China

== As a harvest festival ==
Vaisakhi is a harvest festival for people of Northern India. Chander and Dogra (2003) state that in Punjab, Vaisakhi marks the ripening of the rabi harvest. Vaisakhi, the Hindu Solar new year, also marks the Nepalese Bengali New year and Punjabi cultural day Fairs or Melas (fair) are held in many parts of North India to mark the new year and the harvesting season. Vaisakhi fairs take place in various places, including Jammu City, Kathua, Udhampur, Reasi and Samba, in the Pinjore complex near Chandigarh, in Himachal Pradesh cities of Rewalsar, Shimla, Mandi and Prashar Lakes. According to Ann Louise Wood, Vaisakhi is a festival that is celebrated by the Hindus, Sikhs and Muslims of Punjab.

In western Punjab, Punjabi Muslims used to celebrate Baisakhi as a harvest festival, but Islamist policies of Zia-ul-Haq led to the ending of its observance, becoming solely viewed as a Sikh celebration rather than a pan-Punjabi one. According to Aziz-ud-din Ahmed, Lahore used to have Baisakhi Mela after the harvesting of the wheat crop in April. However, adds Ahmed, the city started losing its cultural vibrancy in 1970s after Zia-ul-Haq came to power, and in recent years "the Pakistan Muslim League (N) government in Punjab banned kite flying through an official edict more under the pressure of those who want a puritanical version of Islam to be practiced in the name of religion than anything else".

== See also ==
- Jallianwala Bagh massacre
- Gudi Padwa
- Nowruz
