= Bhangal Kalan =

- Village
- Location in Punjab, India Bhangal Kalan (India)
- Coordinates: 31.1154514°N 76.0829646°E
- Country: India
- State: Punjab
- District: Shaheed Bhagat Singh Nagar

Government
  - Type: Panchayat raj
  - Body: Gram panchayat
- Elevation: 251 m (823 ft)

Population (2011)
  - Total: 1,890
- Sex ratio 970/920 ♂/♀

Languages
  - Official: Punjabi
- Time zone: UTC+5:30 (IST)
- PIN: 144421
- Telephone code: 01823
- ISO 3166 code: IN-PB
- Post office: Sahlon
- Website: nawanshahr.nic.in

Bhangal Kalan is a village in Shaheed Bhagat Singh Nagar district of Punjab State, India. Kalan is a Persian word for big and Khurd is a Persian word for small, when two villages have the same name they are distinguished by using Kalan or Khurd with the village name. It is situated on Bahara-Nawanshahr link road and located 6.7 kilometres (4.2 mi) away from postal head office Sahlon, 10 kilometres (6.2 mi) from Rahon, 3.3 kilometres (2.1 mi) from district headquarter Shaheed Bhagat Singh Nagar and 94 kilometres (58 mi) from state capital Chandigarh. The village is administrated by Sarpanch an elected representative of the village.

== Demography ==
As of 2011, Bhangal Kalan has a total number of 385 houses and population of 1890 of which 970 include are males while 920 are females according to the report published by Census India in 2011. The literacy rate of Bhangal Kalan is 77.79%, higher than the state average of 75.84%. The population of children under the age of 6 years is 197 which is 10.42% of total population of Bhangal Kalan, and child sex ratio is approximately 824 as compared to Punjab state average of 846.

Most of the people are from Schedule Caste which constitutes 42.91% of total population in Bhangal Kalan. The town does not have any Schedule Tribe population so far.

As per the report published by Census India in 2011, 590 people were engaged in work activities out of the total population of Bhangal Kalan which includes 542 males and 48 females. According to census survey report 2011, 96.78% workers describe their work as main work and 3.22% workers are involved in Marginal activity providing livelihood for less than 6 months.

== Education ==
The village has a Punjabi medium, co-ed primary school founded in 1953. The schools provide mid-day meal as per Indian Midday Meal Scheme. As per Right of Children to Free and Compulsory Education Act the school provide free education to children between the ages of 6 and 14.

KC Engineering College and Doaba Khalsa Trust Group Of Institutions are the nearest colleges on the way to Nawanshahr. Industrial Training Institute for women (ITI Nawanshahr) is 5.8 kilometres (3.6 mi) away and Lovely Professional University is 45 kilometres (28 mi) away from the village.

== Landmarks ==
The village has two Sikh shrines Gurudwara Singh Sabha and Gurudwara Kalgidhar Sahib where a fair held annually which attended by people of all religion. Peeran Da Thaan, Patka Baba Balak Nath Ji, Shiv Mandir and Dhathal 108 Sant Baba Rala Ram Ji are religious sites.

=== Festival and fairs ===
People celebrate festivals and fairs annually in Bhangal Kalan which have taken a semi-secular meaning and are regarded as cultural festivals by people of all religions.

- Lakh Data Peer Shinj Mela (Traditional Wrestling Tournament)
- Kabaddi tournament
- yearly "Vishal Jagran"

== Transport ==
Nawanshahr train station is the nearest train station however, Garhshankar Junction railway station is 15 kilometres (9.3 mi) away from the village. Sahnewal Airport is the nearest domestic airport which located 57 kilometres (35 mi) away in Ludhiana and the nearest international airport is located in Chandigarh also Sri Guru Ram Dass Jee International Airport is the second nearest airport which is 153 kilometres (95 mi) away in Amritsar.

== See also ==
- List of villages in India
