= Bhangala, Jalandhar =

Bhangala
- Village
- Location in Punjab, India Bhangala (India)
- Coordinates: 31°08′35.52″N 75°35′35.04″E
- Country: India
- State: Punjab
- District: Jalandhar
- Tehsil: Phillaur

Government
  - Type: Panchayat raj
  - Body: Gram panchayat

Area
  - Total: 234 ha (580 acres)

Population (2011)
  - Total: 1,450; 710/740 ♂/♀
  - Scheduled Castes: 863; 429/434 ♂/♀
  - Total Households: 304

Languages
  - Official: Punjabi
- Time zone: UTC+5:30 (IST)
- Telephone: 01826
- ISO 3166 code: IN-PB
- Vehicle registration: PB-37
- Website: jalandhar.gov.in

Bhangala is a village in Phillaur in Jalandhar district of Punjab State, India. It is located 20 kilometres (12 mi) from sub district headquarter and 30 kilometres (19 mi) from district headquarter. The village is administrated by Sarpanch an elected representative of the village.

== Demography ==
As of 2011, the village has a total number of 304 houses and a population of 1450 of which 710 are males while 740 are females. According to the report published by Census India in 2011, out of the total population of the village 863 people are from Schedule Caste and the village does not have any Schedule Tribe population so far.

== See also ==
- List of villages in India
