= Malpur, SBS Nagar =

Malpur Arkan
- Village
- Location in Punjab, India Malpur Arkan (India)
- Coordinates: 31.1672099°N 76.0634176°E
- Country: India
- State: Punjab
- District: Shaheed Bhagat Singh Nagar

Government
  - Type: Panchayat raj
  - Body: Gram panchayat

Population (2011)
  - Total: 1,683
- Sex ratio 857/826 ♂/♀

Languages
  - Official: Punjabi
- Time zone: UTC+5:30 (IST)
- PIN: 144508
- Telephone code: 01823
- ISO 3166 code: IN-PB
- Post office: Malpur (B.O)
- Website: nawanshahr.nic.in

Malpur Arkan is a village in Shaheed Bhagat Singh Nagar district of Punjab State, India. It is located 7.9 kilometres (4.9 mi) away from sub post office Banga, 9.3 kilometres (5.8 mi) from Nawanshahr, 11.2 kilometres (7.0 mi) from district headquarter Shaheed Bhagat Singh Nagar and 96.7 kilometres (60.1 mi) from state capital Chandigarh. The village is administrated by Sarpanch an elected representative of the village.

== Demography ==
As of 2011, Malpur Arkan has a total number of 338 houses and population of 1683 of which 857 include are males while 926 are females according to the report published by Census India in 2011. The literacy rate of Malpur is 78.23%, higher than the state average of 75.84%. The population of children under the age of 6 years is 167 which is 9.92% of total population of Malpur, and child sex ratio is approximately 898 as compared to Punjab state average of 846.

Most of the people are from Schedule Caste which constitutes 48.66% of total population in Malpur. The town does not have any Schedule Tribe population so far.

As per the report published by Census India in 2011, 554 people were engaged in work activities out of the total population of Malpur which includes 473 males and 81 females. According to census survey report 2011, 98.74% workers describe their work as main work and 1.26% workers are involved in Marginal activity providing livelihood for less than 6 months.

== Education ==
The village has a Punjabi medium, co-ed primary school established in 1972 The school provide mid-day meal as per Indian Midday Meal Scheme. As per Right of Children to Free and Compulsory Education Act the school provide free education to children between the ages of 6 and 14.

KC Engineering College and Doaba Khalsa Trust Group Of Institutions are the nearest colleges. Industrial Training Institute for women (ITI Nawanshahr) is 10.2 kilometres (6.3 mi). The village is 83.3 kilometres (51.8 mi) away from Chandigarh University, 57 kilometres (35 mi) from Indian Institute of Technology and 38 kilometres (24 mi) away from Lovely Professional University.

List of schools nearby:

- Dashmesh Model School, Kahma
- Govt Primary School, Kahlon
- Govt High School, Garcha

== Transport ==
Nawanshahr train station is the nearest train station however, Garhshankar Junction railway station is 12 kilometres (7.5 mi) away from the village. Sahnewal Airport is the nearest domestic airport which located 64 kilometres (40 mi) away in Ludhiana and the nearest international airport is located in Chandigarh also Sri Guru Ram Dass Jee International Airport is the second nearest airport which is 147 kilometres (91 mi) away in Amritsar.

== See also ==
- List of villages in India
