= List of festivals in Pakistan =

This is the list of festivals in Pakistan.

== By region ==
- Shandur Polo Festival
- Festivals in Lahore
- Festivals in Multan
- Punjabi festivals (Pakistan)

== Islamic ==
Day	Month	Festival	
1	Muharram	New Islamic Year	First day of the Islamic calendar
10	Muharram	Ashura	Day of Battle of Karbala
12	Rabi' al-awwal	Eid-Milād-un-Nabī	Birthday of the Prophet Muhammad
27	Rajab	Miraj-un-Nabi	Muhammad's night journey
14/15	Sha'ban	Shab-e-Barat	The night of forgiveness
21/23/25/27/29	Ramadan	Laylat al-Qadr	The night when first verses of Quran were received by Muhammad
29/30	Ramadan	Chaand Raat	The last night of Ramadan celebrated on 29th or 30th depending on when the new moon is sighted
1	Shawal	Eid ul Fitr	The celebration at the end of the fasting month (Ramadan)
9	Dhu al-Hijjah	Day of Arafah	It is celebrated by Muslims through fasting.
10	Dhu al-Hijjah	Eid al-Adha	The celebration of Abraham's sacrifice

== Public holidays in Pakistan ==
- Public holidays in Pakistan

== Festivals in Pakistan ==
Pakistan Day is a momentous milestone in the history of Pakistan movement. This event is held to mark the anniversary of Pakistan Resolution passed by the Muslims of South Asia on 23 March 1940 at Minto Park (now Iqbal Park), Lahore. The resolution was presented by A. K. Fazlul Huq. The nation commemorates this day with great zeal and enthusiasm, to honor the most outstanding achievement of the Muslims of South Asia who passed the historic Pakistan Resolution resulting in the creation of Pakistan under the dynamic leadership of Quaid-e-Azam Muhammad Ali Jinnah; a homeland where they could live in peace, harmony and in accordance with the tenets of Islam.

- Chaand Raat
- Iqbal Day
- Quaid-e-Azam Day
- Pakistan Flower Show
- Yom-e Bab ul-Islam
- Future Fest Pakistan

== Literary festivals in Pakistan ==
- Islamabad Literature Festival
- Karachi Literature Festival
- Lahore Literary Festival

== Film festivals in Pakistan ==
- Cinéaste One Student Film Festival
- Indus Telefilm Festival
- Kara Film Festival

== Music festivals in Pakistan ==
- All Pakistan Music Conference
- Dosti Music Project

== Technology Festivals in Pakistan ==
- Future Fest Pakistan

== Local events ==
Day	Month	Festival	
23-26	February	Pakistan Flower Show	Flower Show at Karachi
	February–March	Jashn-e-Baharaan	The celebrations with the start of Spring season
23	March	Pakistan Day	Republic Day and to commemorate the Lahore Resolution
28	May	Youm-e-Takbir	Celebrated in commemoration of the first Nuclear test
14	August	Independence Day	Celebrated to commemorate the day when Pakistan gained Independence in 1947
6	September	Defence Day	Celebrated in memory of those who died in the Indo-Pak war of 1965
7	September	Air Force Day	Celebrated to commend the role of Pakistan Air Force in the 1965 war with India
8	September	Navy Day	Celebrated to commend the role of Pakistan Navy in the 1965 war with India
9	November	Iqbal Day	Birthday of Muhammad Iqbal
	March	Pakistan Flower Show	Pakistan Flower Show (Karachi) – Annual flower exhibition.
25	December	Quaid-e-Azam Day	Birthday of Muhammad Ali Jinnah

== Fairs ==
- Mela Chiraghan, this fair is famous in Pakistan.
- Kalam summer festival

== See also ==
- Public holidays in Pakistan
- Culture of Pakistan
