= Ishtiaq Ahmed (political scientist) =

Swedish political scientist and author (born 1947)

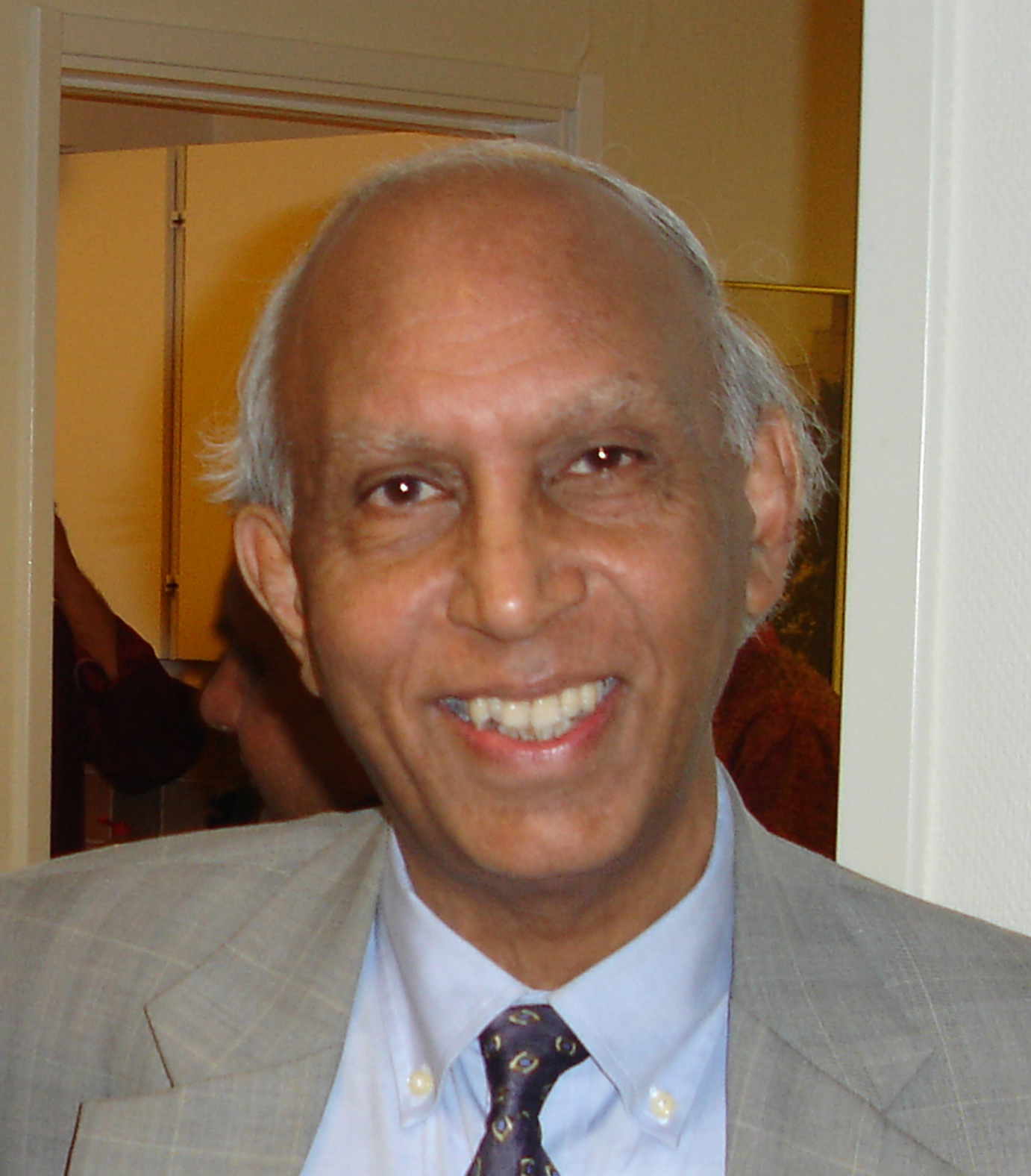
- Ishtiaq Ahmed
- Born: Ishtiaq Ahmed; 24 February 1947 (age 79); Lahore, Punjab, British India (now in Punjab, Pakistan)
- Citizenship: Swedish
- Education: Stockholm University; University of the Punjab; Forman Christian College; St. Anthony's High School
- Scientific career
- Fields: Political science
- Workplaces: Visiting Professor, Government College University Lahore, Pakistan

Ishtiaq Ahmed (Urdu: اشتیاق احمد; born 24 February 1947) is a Pakistani-Swedish political scientist, academic, and author. He is Professor Emeritus of Political Science at Stockholm University, Sweden. Ahmed is known for his research on the political history of South Asia, particularly the partition of India in 1947. His scholarly work examines the ideological foundations and consequences of the partition, with a focus on the role of Muhammad Ali Jinnah and the Two-Nation Theory.

Ahmed’s research integrates themes of religion, ethnicity, language, and identity in South Asian politics. His academic contributions include books such as The Punjab Bloodied, Partitioned and Cleansed, which received the Best Non-Fiction Book Award at both the Karachi and Lahore Literature Festivals in 2013, and Jinnah: His Successes, Failures and Role in History.

In addition to his academic publications, Ahmed has been a visiting professor at institutions including the National University of Singapore, Lahore University of Management Sciences (LUMS), and Government College University Lahore. His views on nationalism, religious politics, and the garrison state model of Pakistan have been featured in South Asian newspapers and journals.

== Early life and education ==
Ishtiaq Ahmed was born on 24 February 1947 in Lahore, within the Punjab Province of British India (now in Punjab, Pakistan) into the Arain community of Punjabis. He grew up in the Mozang area of Lahore; his father Mian Ghulam Muhammad Ghazi represented Forman Christian College in hockey and kabaddi and finished second in the one-mile race at the annual Punjab University sports competition held on 18–19 November 1932. Ahmed also studied at the Forman Christian College, where from 1964 to 1968 he received an honorable mention each year and in 1968 he was awarded the Mehta Chunni Lal Gold Medal for securing the highest marks in English and History at the same institution. He later earned a PhD in Political Science from Stockholm University in 1986.

In his early life he was close to socialist ideologies, including Marxism and Maoism, having been a co-founder of the National Students Federation (NSF).

Fond of Hindi film music from the 1940s to the 1960s, during his college days he won several awards as a singer in youth festivals. His father introduced him to music when he asked him to recit a na'at (poetry in the praise of prophet Mohammed) from Mohammed Rafi.

== Academic career ==
His first posting as a teacher was in Gordon College, Rawalpindi. He taught at Stockholm University from 1987 to 2007, after which he served as Senior Research Fellow and Visiting Research Professor at the Institute of South Asian Studies, National University of Singapore, from 2007 to 2010. He is currently Professor Emeritus of Political Science at Stockholm University and Honorary Senior Fellow at the Institute of South Asian Studies, National University of Singapore. He has published extensively on Pakistani and South Asian politics, with research interests including political Islam, ethnicity and nationalism, human and minority rights, and Partition studies. Ahmed has also given lectures in various institutions including the University of Central Punjab (UCP), where he discussed politics, the Kashmir issue and the economy of Pakistan.

== Views and opinions ==
=== State of Punjabi language in Pakistan ===
Irfan Aslam in his article Punjabis themselves are oppressing their own language, about the persecution of Punjabi language in Pakistan, argues that Ishtiaq Ahmed asserts that the Punjabi bureaucracy and politicians are responsible for oppressing the Punjabi language, and imposing Urdu as the national language.

=== Two Nation Theory ===
Ishtiaq Ahmed has provided a critique of the Two-Nation Theory by quoting Mohammad Ali Jinnah to the effect that the founder of Pakistan consistently argued that Hindus and Muslims could not live in peace together in one state and therefore India must be partitioned to create Pakistan.

Quoting from March 22, 1940 onwards Jinnah’s speeches, statements and messages Ishtiaq Ahmed demonstrates that Jinnah’s two – nation theory was deployed by him to argue that Hindus and Muslims can never constitute a cohesive and coherent nation. Rather, both were the antithesis of one another. Upon such a basis, he took an uncompromising stand on the absolute imperative of partitioning India to create Pakistan, and rejected out of hand that he was using the demand for Pakistan as a bargaining chip to achieve a power-sharing deal with the Indian National Congress.

=== Military meddling in Pakistan's politics ===
Ahmed has written about military spending in Pakistan. In his article "Garrison state: Academic urges government to cut back on military spending", he urges the Pakistani government to reduce military spending.

=== Jinnah ===
In his article "Many Promises of Jinnah", Ahmed discusses various promises and pledges of Jinnah. He criticises many scholars' tendency to absolve Jinnah of responsibility for the Partition of India. He argues that these scholars focus on one speech by Jinnah, ignoring his consistent assertion from 1940 to 1947 that Hindus and Muslims could never be one nation. He later wrote a book entitled Jinnah: His Successes, Failures, and Role in History, which was critically acclaimed and won an international literary award. His scholarship was subsequently the basis for a multimedia timeline of the Partition of India and the broader history of the Hindu-Muslim divide in India.

=== Partition of Punjab ===
Ahmed has conducted research on the partition of Punjab in 1947, examining the events and consequences surrounding the division of the region. In his book The Punjab: Bloodied, Partitioned and Cleansed, he presents an account of the communal violence, migrations, and political decisions that shaped the partition of Punjab. He explores how the division of Punjab led to significant human displacement and loss of life, and analyses the political and social factors that contributed to the escalation of violence.

Ahmed argues that violence in Punjab was not inevitable and highlights the role of various political actors in the unfolding events. His work has been cited in discussions of the partition's legacy and its long-term impact on South Asian history.

== Books ==
Year	Title	Role	Publisher	Notes
1987	The Concept of an Islamic State: An Analysis of the Ideological Controversy in Pakistan	Author	New York: St. Martin's Press	Based on his 1986 PhD thesis.
1996	State, Nation, and Ethnicity in Contemporary South Asia	Author	Pinter (London & New York)	Study of ethnicity, nationalism, and state formation in South Asia.
2005	The Politics of Group Rights: The State and Multiculturalism	Editor	University Press of America	Edited academic volume on minority rights and multiculturalism.
2011	The Politics of Religion in South and Southeast Asia	Editor	Routledge	Edited volume on religion and politics in South and Southeast Asia.
2012	The Punjab Bloodied, Partitioned and Cleansed: Unravelling the 1947 Tragedy through Secret British Reports and First-Person Accounts	Author	Oxford University Press	Archival study of Partition-era violence in Punjab.
2013	Pakistan – The Garrison State: Origins, Evolution, Consequences, 1947–2011	Author	Oxford University Press	Analysis of Pakistan’s civil–military relations.
2020	Jinnah: His Successes, Failures and Role in History	Author	Penguin Random House India (Viking)	Political biography and reassessment of Muhammad Ali Jinnah.
2023	Pre-Partition Punjab’s Contribution to Indian Cinema	Author	Penguin Random House India (Viking)	Study of ethnic Punjabis' contributions to Hindi cinema.
2024	Reflections of a Concerned Global Citizen	Author	Fiction House	Collection of political and ethical reflections.

== Honours and awards ==
- 1964–1968 — Honorable mention each year at Forman Christian College, Lahore.
- 1968 — Mehta Chunni Lal Gold Medal for highest marks in English and History at Forman Christian College, Lahore.
- 2013 — The Punjab Bloodied, Partitioned and Cleansed awarded the Best Non-Fiction Book Award at the Karachi Literature Festival, Pakistan.
- 2013 — The Punjab Bloodied, Partitioned and Cleansed awarded the Best Non-Fiction Book Award at the Lahore Literature Festival, Pakistan.
- 2021 — Jinnah: His Successes, Failures, and Role in History awarded for English non-fiction by Valley of Words International Literature and Arts Festival.
