= Culture of Karachi =

The cultural history of Karachi (Urdu:تاریخ ثقافتی کراچی) dates back at least five thousand years to the rise of the Indus Valley Civilization in the third millennium BC. The early culture was predominantly Neolithic, characterized by the widespread use of small tools and semi-precious stones. The numerous megalithic Arab graves found around Karachi suggest significant megalithic activity from the Arabian Peninsula. Karachi culture is a blend of Sindhi, Urdu, Pashto, Balochi, Islamic, Middle Eastern cultures, with influences from the cultures of Arabian Peninsula and West Asia. Karachi's inhabitants, locally known as Karachiites, are composed of ethnolinguistic groups from all parts of Pakistan, as well as long-distance migrants from Asia, making the city's population a cultural and demographic melting pot.

== History of Karachi ==
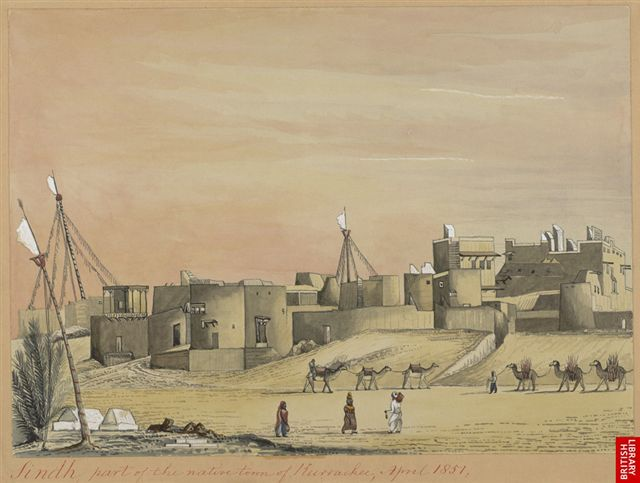
Part of the town of Karachi, with mud houses; camels and villagers in foreground. April 1851

Historians called Karachi Krokola, which literally means "a place of crocodile worship". Around 1558, Karachi was a conglomerate of about 24 fishing villages called Kolachi or Kalati. This small settlement became wealthy when Seth Bhoju Mal laid the foundation of a small township on the left bank of Lyari River in 1729. During 1793, princes from the Kalhora dynasty viewed the harbor as a way to gain profits. Later, in 1839, the British captured the Manora Fort, thereby putting the town under British rule.

The modern port city of Karachi was developed by authorities of the British Raj in the 19th century. Upon the independence of Pakistan in 1947, the city was selected to become the national capital, and was settled by Muslim Urdu-speaking Muhajirs (اردو مہاجر قوم, creators of Pakistan) at the time of independence, which boosted both the population and economy.

== Heritage ==
The cultural heritage of Karachi after 1947 is that of the Muhajir community of Urdu-speaking (اردو مہاجر قوم) and their Urdu language, clothes (پاجامہ شیروانی), education and foods (Nihari, Biryani, Kabab, Nihari; نہاری, بریانی, کباب, حلیم).

Its earlier heritage includes the story of the Kalachi-Jo-Kunn (whirlpool of Kalachi), in which Moriro performed a feat of strength by killing a monstrous shark that killed all six of his brothers as they were fishing.

A number of cultural sites in and around Karachi testify to the glorious past of Karachi. In recent years, the Sindhi population in the city has surged.

WAGU DARR, earthen cavity for the living of a crocodile, is located at the coastal village of Chashma Goth near Korangi. A natural sweet water spring flows perennially past this site. It is also a crocodile worship center besides Manghopir where people offer meat to the crocodiles and bathe in hot and cold sulphuric springs to treat skin diseases. The ruins of RATO KOT are located in the Korangi Creek. This fort is thought to have been a contemporary settlement of Debal's port (sometimes called Bhambhore) conquered by Mohammad Bin Qasim in 712 AD. Baked earthen balls used in mechanically driven cannons, shards, glazed tiles, and other artifacts are found scattered on the site. The Chokandi graveyard, a protected monument of the 17th— 18th century, and BALOCH TOMBS near Memon Goth of Malir exhibit monumental structures of stone-carved graves.

MOKHI-MATARA (named after the folklore story) is another cultural site situated on the top of Narathar Hill near Gadap and located on an ancient route emanating from ancient Debal port to Central Asia. The folklore of Mokhi-Matara is also sung by Sindh's greatest poet, Shah Abdul Latif Bhittai.

== Language ==
Historically, Sindhi and Balochi were spoken by the native population before the British conquest in 1843 by Charles James Napier. During British rule, many Gujarati and Zoroastrian business families as well as Christian Goans bureaucrats migrated from Bombay Presidency to Karachi, as it was being developed as a major port. After the independence of Pakistan in 1947, Muslim (Muhajirs) migrated to Karachi. The vast majority of Muhajirs spoke Urdu. Today, Karachi is a predominantly Urdu-speaking (Muhajir) city with many other languages also spoken in the city. The Pashtuns (Pakhtuns or Pathans), originally from Khyber Pakhtunkhwa and northern Balochistan, are now the city's second largest ethnic group in Karachi after Muhajirs. As high as 7,000,000 people by some estimates, the city of Karachi in Pakistan has the largest concentration of urban Pakhtun population in the world, including 50,000 registered Afghan refugees in the city. The current demographic ratio has 12% of people who are Pashtuns.

== Religion ==
Religions in Karachi
| Religions | Per cent |
| Islam | 96.53% |
| Christianity | 2.21% |
| Hinduism | 1.12% |
| Others | 0.14% |

Religious groups in Karachi City (1872−2023) (Note: 1872-1941: Data for the entirety of the town of Karachi, which included Karachi Municipality and Karachi Cantonment. 2017: Data for the entirety of the town of Karachi, which included the urban populations of Karachi Central District, Karachi East District, Karachi South District, Karachi West District, Malir District, and Korangi District. 2023: Data for the entirety of the town of Karachi, which included the urban populations of Karachi Central District, Karachi East District, Karachi South District, Karachi West District, Malir District, Korangi District, and Keamari District.)
| Religious group | 1872 | | 1881 | | 1891 | | 1901 | | 1911 | | 1921 | | 1931 | | 1941 | | 2017 | | 2023 | |
| Religious group | Pop. | % | Pop. | % | Pop. | % | Pop. | % | Pop. | % | Pop. | % | Pop. | % | Pop. | % | Pop. | % | Pop. | % |
|---|---|---|---|---|---|---|---|---|---|---|---|---|---|---|---|---|---|---|---|---|
| Islam | 33,018 | 55.81% | 38,946 | 52.94% | 52,957 | 50.34% | 60,003 | 51.43% | 74,075 | 48.76% | 100,436 | 46.31% | 122,847 | 46.61% | 162,447 | 42.01% | 14,382,744 | 96.63% | 18,189,474 | 96.53% |
| Hinduism | 23,157 | 39.14% | 24,617 | 33.47% | 44,503 | 42.3% | 48,169 | 41.29% | 66,038 | 43.47% | 100,683 | 46.42% | 120,595 | 45.76% | 192,831 | 49.87% | 156,452 | 1.05% | 211,138 | 1.12% |
| Christianity | 2,223 | 3.76% | 4,161 | 5.66% | 5,986 | 5.69% | 6,098 | 5.23% | 7,936 | 5.22% | 9,649 | 4.45% | 12,765 | 4.84% | 17,466 | 4.52% | 329,702 | 2.22% | 416,309 | 2.21% |
| Zoroastrianism | 748 | 1.26% | 937 | 1.27% | 1,375 | 1.31% | 1,823 | 1.56% | 2,165 | 1.43% | 2,702 | 1.25% | 3,334 | 1.26% | 3,700 | 0.96% | —N/a | —N/a | 1,435 | 0.01% |
| Judaism | 7 | 0.01% | —N/a | —N/a | 128 | 0.12% | 349 | 0.3% | 535 | 0.35% | 645 | 0.3% | 943 | 0.36% | 1,051 | 0.27% | —N/a | —N/a | —N/a | —N/a |
| Jainism | 4 | 0.01% | 9 | 0.01% | 99 | 0.09% | 125 | 0.11% | 647 | 0.43% | 1,118 | 0.52% | 629 | 0.24% | 3,214 | 0.83% | —N/a | —N/a | —N/a | —N/a |
| Tribal | 0 | 0% | —N/a | —N/a | 32 | 0.03% | 0 | 0% | 0 | 0% | 4 | 0% | 135 | 0.05% | —N/a | —N/a | —N/a | —N/a | —N/a | —N/a |
| Sikhism | 0 | 0% | —N/a | —N/a | 0 | 0% | 0 | 0% | —N/a | —N/a | 1,425 | 0.66% | 2,254 | 0.86% | 5,835 | 1.51% | —N/a | —N/a | 2,299 | 0.01% |
| Buddhism | 0 | 0% | —N/a | —N/a | 0 | 0% | 0 | 0% | —N/a | —N/a | 41 | 0.02% | 53 | 0.02% | 75 | 0.02% | —N/a | —N/a | —N/a | —N/a |
| Ahmadiyya | —N/a | —N/a | —N/a | —N/a | —N/a | —N/a | —N/a | —N/a | —N/a | —N/a | —N/a | —N/a | —N/a | —N/a | —N/a | —N/a | 8,751 | 0.06% | 7,948 | 0.04% |
| Others | 0 | 0% | 4,890 | 6.65% | 119 | 0.11% | 96 | 0.08% | 507 | 0.33% | 180 | 0.08% | 10 | 0% | 36 | 0.01% | 6,753 | 0.05% | 15,241 | 0.08% |
| Total population | 59,157 | 100% | 73,560 | 100% | 105,199 | 100% | 116,663 | 100% | 151,903 | 100% | 216,883 | 100% | 263,565 | 100% | 386,655 | 100% | 14,884,402 | 100% | 18,843,844 | 100% |

== Literature ==
Poetry has close connections to Pakistani culture. Karachi boasts a large community of intellectuals who come together in designated open spaces to share their talent in poetry events known as mushairas in the local language. Many intellectuals and aspiring poets from all over the nation travel to Karachi, hoping to find better work opportunities in the city.

Notable poets include Ishrat Afreen, a Pakistani feminist and a prominent poet. Afreen recently launched her second Urdu poetry collection under the name "Dhoop apnay hissay ki".

Mustansar Hussain Tarar, recently released a collection of short stories after switching from poetry to writing fiction, entitled "Pandra Kahaniyan".

Ahfazur Rahman, a non-fiction Karachi writer, received praise on his book Sab Say Bari Jang.

== Arts ==
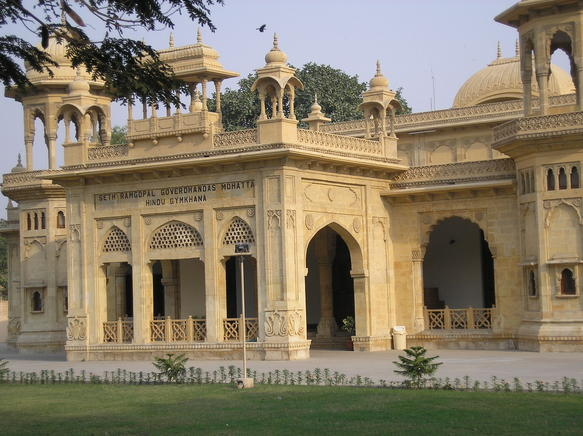
National Academy of Performing Arts

=== Art academies, arenas and festivals ===
Karachi is home to some of Pakistan's important cultural institutions. The National Academy of Performing Arts is located in the newly renovated Hindu Gymkhana. The All Pakistan Music Conference, linked to the 45-year-old similar institution in Lahore, has been holding its Annual Music Festival since its inception in 2004. The festival is considered to be a prominent part of the culture, awaited anxiously and attended by more than 3000 citizens of Karachi as well as people from other cities.

Aside from performances by musical acts, Karachi has an underground music scene where traditional musical influences blend with modern, Western styles to create fusion music. Many emerging musicians have based themselves in Karachi. Musical acts can be found in cafes, restaurants, and concerts across Karachi, especially in the city's upper middle class and upper class areas.

The National Arts Council (Koocha-e-Saqafat) also has musical performances and mushairas. Karachi has a few museums, the Mohatta Palace Museum and National Museum of Pakistan, that regularly have exhibitions related to performance arts. Karachi is also home to the annual Kara Film Festival, which is one of the biggest film festivals in Pakistan and showcases independent Pakistani and international films and documentaries.

=== Galleries and fine art exhibitions ===
Karachi is home to the Clifton Art Gallery and Koel Gallery. The Calligraphy Artist Bin Qulander exhibited his work entitled "God in the details".

== Cuisine ==
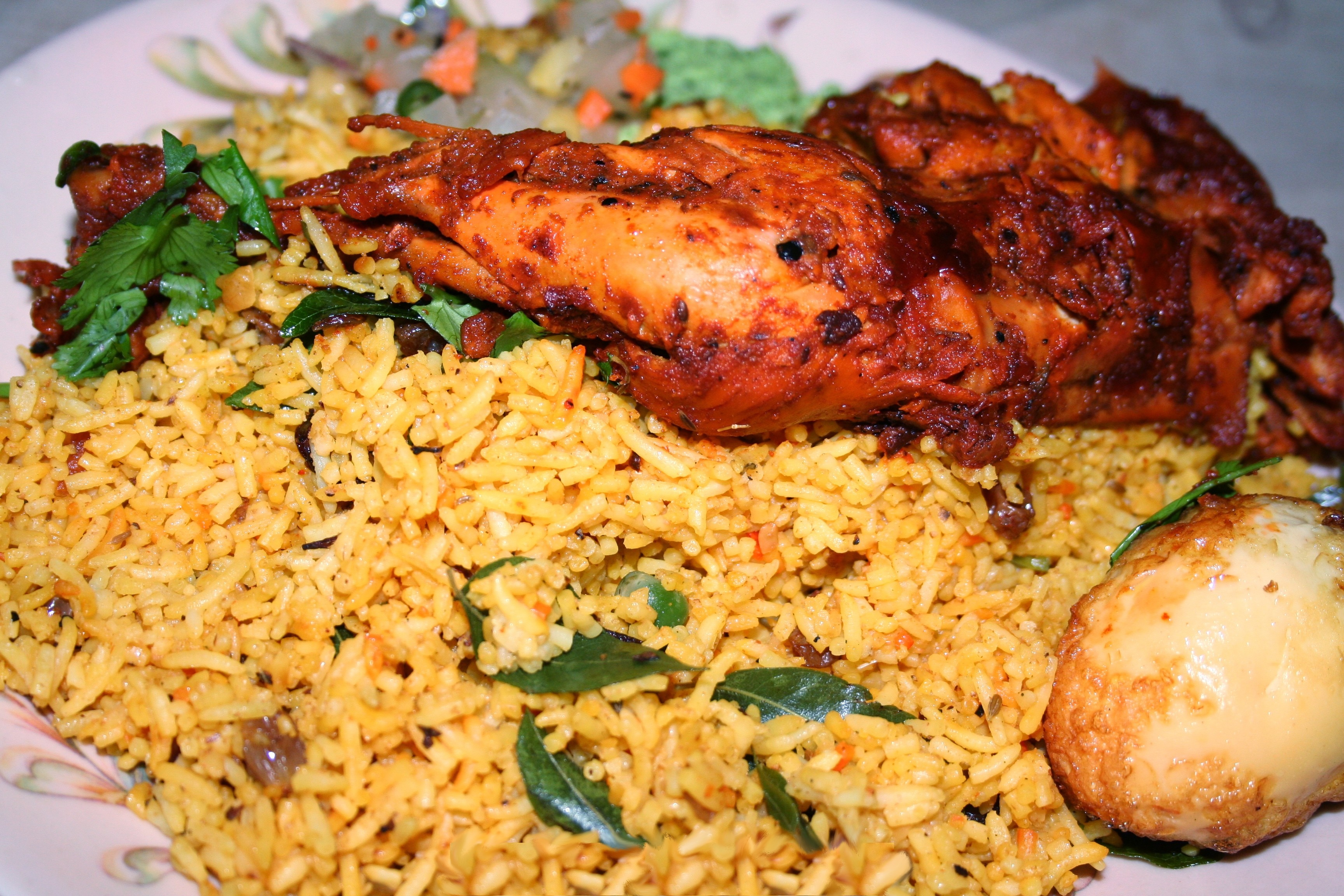
Chicken Biryani

Meat, mainly beef and mutton, plays a dominant role in Karachi food. Bihari kebabs, pulses like lentils called dal, are primarily featured in the town's local dishes. Dishes made with rice include pullao and biryani. Different kinds of breads include Naan, Tandoor bread, Chapati, Paratha and Puri. Sindhi biryani is also very common in the city.

== Festivals ==
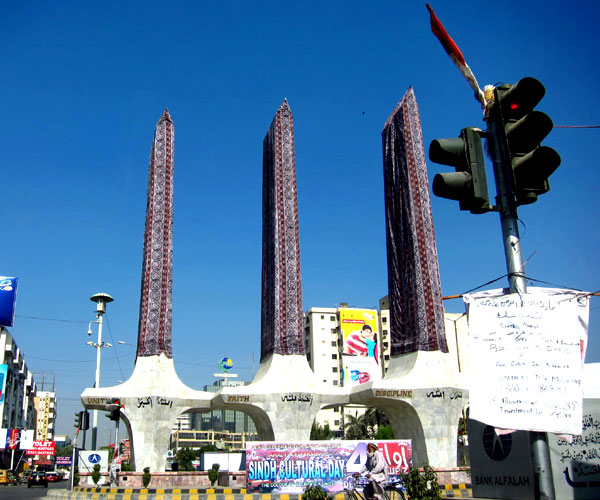
Teen Talwar decorated with traditional ajrak on Sindh Cultural Day

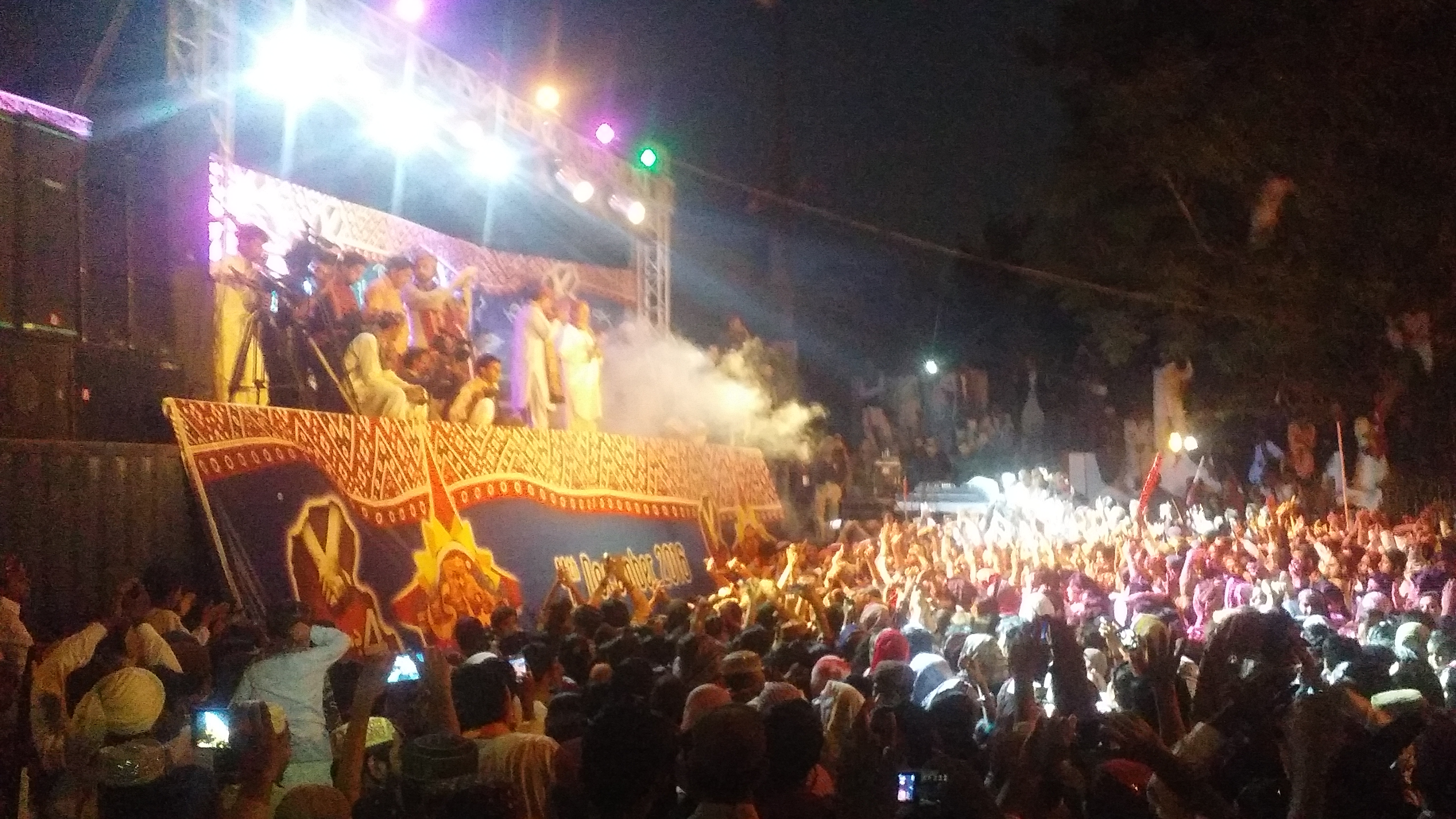
Sindhi Cultural Day 2016

Many religious and cultural festivities are observed across the city. Religious events such as Ramadan, Chaand Raat, Eid, Milad un Nabi, and Ashura are commonly celebrated. Shopping reaches its peak during the Eid season, as not only established businesses come in, but vendors from all over the country come to the city to sell their goods to the city's large population, a majority of which is middle class and relatively well-off compared to most other parts of the country. Many rallies and parades are carried out during the events of Milaad un Nabi, Ashura, Jashn-e-Baharan, and Nowruz by religious leaders and followers all across the city. Ethnic and religious minorities, like Christians, Zoroastrians, Hindus, or Ismailis, also celebrate their events, although not on as large a scale as Islamic events.

Independence Day on 14 August is an important event for all Karachiites. A national holiday is commenced all over the country on this date, as homes are decorated with flags and patriotic embellishments, and children sing patriotic songs known as milli naghmas. The festivity of this day is such that a small cottage industry has emerged in large cities, like Karachi, to supply the decoration demands of Independence Day. Although not as recognized as Independence Day, Defence Day is also passionately observed across the city on 6 September every year. Pakistan Day or Resolution Day is observed on 23 March every year.

The Sindh Cultural Day is celebrated in the city in the month of December every year since 2009. People wear traditional Sindhi topi and Ajrak and gather to play songs, dance, and attend watch artists perform.

== National dress ==
The national dress of Karachi is Shalwar Qameez (Urdu: شلوار قمیض), a traditional garment worn by both women and men in Pakistan and Afghanistan. Shalwar are loose pajama-like trousers. The legs are wide at the top and narrow at the bottom. The Qameez is a long shirt or tunic. The side seams (known as the chaak) are left open below the waist for flexibility.

== Ethnic communities ==
Karachi dwellers prefer to maintain their basic ethnic identity and lifestyles, and live together with their respective groups in their respective neighborhoods. For example, Kiamari is known for their Kutchi language and Kharadar is for Memons and Agha Khanis; similarly, Lyari is known for Baloch and Memons, Nazimabad and Liaquatabad for Muhajirs (Urdu speaking people), and Malir is known for Sindhi. The mentality has been reinforced as a result of serious clashes, which have taken place in the recent past among different ethnic groups in this city.

== Karachi in popular culture of Sindh ==
Karachi has been sung about, notably the folk songs from in Sindhi marriages, called Sehra (سهرا) and Ladda (لاڏا ) such as:

آيلڙي مون ته سُئي وڃائي
ڪراچيءَ جي شهر مان مون سُئي گھُرائي

sung by Zarina Baloch and

ڪراچيءَ جي شهر مان منڊيون جوڙايم
سونا گل ڪراچيءَ جي موٽر ڀرجي آيا

In addition, Karachi is also known for the legend of Morirro Mirbahar, sung by Shah Abdul Latif Bhitai in his poetry. This legend has also been adapted into a Sindhi movie titled Ghatoo Ghar na Ayaa (Sindhi: گھاتُو گھر نه آيا).

Karachi jaa ddeeha' aee' raatioo (Sindhi: ڪراچيءَ جا ڏينهن ۽ راتيون, Days and Nights of Karachi) is a novel written by Muhammad Bux Johar.

== See also ==
- Karachi
- Moriro
- Sheedi Mela
- Pir Mangho Urs
- Culture of Sindh
- Culture of Pakistan
- Middle Eastern culture
- Asian culture
