= Ameena Saiyid =

Pakistani business executive

Ameena Saiyid OBE is a former managing director of Oxford University Press (OUP) in Pakistan.

== Education and career ==
She attended Karachi Grammar School for her education. Ameena Saiyid started working, as a salesperson, for the Lahore office of Oxford University Press in 1979 and became the managing director of 'OUP Pakistan' in 1988, becoming the first woman to ever head a multinational company in Pakistan.

She is also the founder of the Karachi Literature Festival and Islamabad Literary Festival in Pakistan. Approximately 225,000 people visited the Karachi Literary Festival in 2018.

Saiyid taught at Lahore American School before joining Oxford University Press in 1979. She joined OUP in Lahore and served in various capacities before leaving in 1986 to launch her own publishing house, Saiyid Books. In 1988, she rejoined as its chief executive. After 30 years with Oxford University Press (OUP) Pakistan, Ameena Saiyid, OBE announced her retirement in December 2018. By the early 2000s, Oxford University Press was the biggest academic publisher of books.

== Awards and recognition ==
- In 2005, she became the first Pakistani woman to be awarded the Order of the British Empire for her services to women’s rights, education, and intellectual property rights in Pakistan, and to Anglo-Pakistan relations.
- In February 2013, she was conferred the prestigious French award of Knight of the Order of Arts and Letters for her work in promoting literary culture.
- In 2018, Sitara-i-Imtiaz (Star of Excellence) award by the President of Pakistan for her contributions to Pakistan.

=== Other activities ===
In 2009, she became a member of the Federal Investigation Agency Advisory Committee on IPR Enforcement.

In April 2010, she became the first woman elected to be president of the 150-year-old Overseas Investors Chamber of Commerce and Industry (OICCI), after serving as its vice president in 2009–2010, which was also a first for a woman.
