= Mokhi and Matara =

Sindhi folklore story

Folk tale
- Name: Mokhi and Matara
- Region: Sindh

Mokhi and Matara (The Barmaid and Bachhana; Sindhi: موکي ۽ متارا) is famous story of a Barmaid, "Mokhi", who unwillingly served the poisonous "Mandh" (wine) to the Matara, eight young stout men who visited her tavern and died after drinking heavily from the goblet. These Mataras (Devotees of Bachhus) belonged to Channa, Chauhan, Samma and Soomra tribes who were the notables of Sari in the Kohistan area of Sindh. Their tombs are still to be found at the foothill of Narathar in Gadap tehsil of Karachi.

== Background ==
The story of Mokhi and Matara is connected with another romantic tale of Sindh Momal Rano, after the separation of Momal Rano, Momal burned herself, and her servant Natar, mother of Mokhi left Kaak Mahal and settled in Gadap near Karachi, she opened a tavern and started selling pots filled with wine. After some time, she mothered a child, a girl whom she called, Mokhi. After the death of Natar, Mokhi continues to run the brewery.

== Story ==
An enterprising woman, Natar, had established a brewery and opened a tavern for care-free folks at the site of "Konkar" village in the present day Gadap town of Karachi. Her daughter Mokhi, a thoughtful and courteous girl, served as barmaid. The fame of the tavern and the name of Mokhi travelled far and wide and wine-bibbers, tipplers and revelers began to frequent the place. But, one day the Mataras, real devotees of Bacchus, came. They were eight adventurous young men, two each from the Samma, Soomra, Channa and Chauhan clans. They had come all the way from their distant quarters to drink the varieties of mandh (wine) at this famous tavern. They enjoyed their drinks and decided to visit the place again. After six months, they came again and enjoyed the experience so much that they now determined to take this long journey to the tavern every six months. Mokhi served them whenever they came and each time they left satiated.

Once, as they arrived, it so happened that no old wine was left to be served to them. Mokhi was much perturbed, but remembered an old wine jar long abandoned in the corner, and she hastened to it. The jar was full to the brim, but a cobra seemed to have fallen into it a long time ago; its flesh was dissolved and only the skeleton was left. "To serve or not?" mused Mokhi. Obviously, the wine had the venom of the cobra in it, though it was very colourful and had fermented a long time. So instead of disappointing her fond customers, she decided to serve them this wine, apologising at the same time that since no other wine was available, she had no choice but to offer them an old wine jar. They welcomed the offer, took sips and enjoyed the taste immensely. They asked for more of it and drank cup after cup. "Never did we taste such a wine," they said admiringly. They were heavily intoxicated, and left the tavern enjoying the superb quality of the wine and praising this great act of Mokhi.

After a year they returned. Mokhi was happy to welcome them, knowing that plenty of good-quality wine was available this time. She served them with grace and confidence, but after their first sips they returned the cups to her and asked for the wine they had been served the previous year. Mokhi was baffled at the situation. She tried another wine of excellent quality but that too was returned. They entreated to her to serve them the same old wine. Finding them desperate, Mokhi now saw no other way but to tell them the truth about the wine.

"The wine that you had last year was from an old abandoned jar and it contained cobra venom."

"Cobra! A cobra! What?" they cried in unison.

The very thought of venom and its effect shocked them and they all fell dead on the spot and were buried there. The graves of these Matara, the stout men, are still seen in an old graveyard on the hillock.

== History and influence ==
The story depicts socio-cultural aspects of Medieval Sindh in which the affairs of a tavern are run by women (Natar and her daughter Mokhi). The earliest reference of this saga are found in the verses of renowned poets of Sindh, Shah Karim, Shah Inat and Shah Latif. Later on other poets also alluded to it. The story finds numerous references in Sindhi folk poetry. The center of attention is a subtle psychological idea that "in genuine zeal and zest one survives a real hazard, but conscious feeling of the hazard may be fatal even after it is all over."

== See also ==
- Moriro
- Culture of Karachi
