= Ali Akbar Natiq =

Pakistani poet and writer

- Punjabi: علی اکبر ناطق
- Born: December 22, 1974 (age 51) [Okara, Punjab, Pakistan
- Education: M.A
- Alma mater: Bahauddin Zakariya University
- Occupations: Writer, poet, Activist
- Writing career
- Pen name: Natiq
- Language: Punjabi, Urdu
- Notable works: Naulakhi Kothi; Kamari Wala

Ali Akbar Natiq (born 22 December 1972) is a Pakistani poet, novelist and short-story writer. Natiq has published many books.

== Early life and education ==
Ali Akbar Natiq was born at village 32/2L, in Okara District, Punjab, Pakistan. His ancestors migrated from Faizabad, near Lucknow, to Firozpur district in Punjab at the turn of the 20th century, and then during the partition of India in 1947, they emigrated to Pakistan, coming from Firozpur via Sulemanki Headworks, and settled in Okara.

Natiq studied up to matric at his village high school and passed FA exam from Government College, Okara. After that, due to poor economic circumstances, he started working and got his BA and MA degrees privately from Bahauddin Zakariya University, Multan.

Natiq started working as a mason and was skilled at building domes, minarets and mosques. Meanwhile, his studies of Urdu literature and history also continued. He also read the Arabic books which his father had brought from Iraq and Kuwait where he had gone to work. Whenever he got free time from work, he was busy studying. In 1998, he also stayed in Saudi Arabia and the Middle East for some time as a laborer.

== Career ==
His first collection of poetry "Beyaqeen Bastiyon Mein" appeared in 2010, followed by a book of short stories "Qaim Deen" published by Oxford University Press in 2012. All two books have received UBL and Oxford Awards. Penguin Random House India published the English version of the aforementioned collection of the short stories titled "What Will You Give For This Beauty?". His story "Mason's Hand" has been featured in international literary magazine Granta in its special issue on Pakistan in 2011. In 2013, he published another book of poems "Yaqoot Ke Warq", from which selected poems were translated into German. His first novel "Naulakhi Kothi" was launched at 6th Karachi Literature Festival. The novel is being translated into English and is expected to be published by Penguin India and America. In 2015, after being inspired by Natiq's book Qaim Deen, Indian actor and theatre director Danish Husain adapted four of his short stories in his play "Ek Punjab Ye Bhi" which opened during the Prithvi Theatre Festival at Prithvi Theatre, Mumbai. Natiq next published his second book of short stories named "Shah Muhammad Ka Tanga" in Urdu. This book has been translated into Hindi and English in same name from Delhi by Jagarnath Publishing, India. Beside poetry and fiction, Natiq also wrote a book with a critical account on poetry of famous poet Allama Muhammad Iqbal and a book aiming at discussing the critical aspects of the art of versification.

He was former professor of Urdu at Uswa College, Islamabad and a former assistant professor at University of Lahore, Department School of Creative Art. On 16 July 2018, the American daily newspaper The New York Times published his article on the topic of democracy in Pakistan. He originally wrote the article in Urdu language, which was translated by Basharat Peer in English. His second novel "Kamari Wala" was published in 2020.

== Writings ==
- Naulakhi Kothi (Novel) (نو لکھی کوٹھی), 2015
- Kamari Wala (Novel) (کماری والا), 2020
- Qaim Deen (Short Stories) (قائم دین)
- Shah Muhammad Ka Tanga ( Short stories) (شاہ محمد کا ٹانگہ)
- Fakeer Basti Main Tha (فقیر بستی میں تھا)
- Sabz Bastion Ke Ghazaal (سبز بستیوں کے غزال)
- Be Yaqeen Bastion Main (Poetry) (بے یقین بستیوں میں)
- Yaqoot Ke Warq (Poetry) (یاقوت کے ورق)

٭ Kofa ka Musafir (Novel) (کوفہ کا مسافر), 2024
