= Lahore Literary Festival =

Annual literary festival in Lahore, Punjab, Pakistan

Lahore Literary Festival (LLF) جشنواره ادبی لاہور
- Genre: Literary festival
- Begins: 2013
- Frequency: Thrice a year
- Locations: Lahore, London, New York
- Years active: 13
- Founder: Razi Ahmed
- Website: lahorelitfest.org

The Lahore Literary Festival (LLF) is an international literary festival held annually in Lahore, Punjab, Pakistan. The festival is considered to be one of Asia's premier cultural events.

The UNESCO Creative Cities Network added Lahore to its number in 2019, less than a year after the head of the UNESCO City of Literature Heidelberg highlighted Lahore’s suitability for the program at the Lahore Literary Festival.

LLF 2015 drew over 75,000 visitors to the halls and grounds of Alhamra Arts Centre to hear various Punjabi, Pakistani and international speakers including Romila Thapar, Abdullah Hussein, Ayesha Jalal, Asma Jahangir, Eve Ensler, Roger Cohen, Mohsin Hamid, Laurent Gayer, Rahul Singh, Hameed Haroon, Yasmine El Rashidi, Naseeruddin Shah, Joe Sacco, Romesh Gunesekera, Ziauddin Sardar, Osman Samiuddin, Mushtaq Soofi, and Aminatta Forna.

== Editions ==
The grounds at Lahore Literary Festival 2026

LLF hold annual ticketed editions in New York City with Asia Society and in London with the British Library. These were discontinued during the covid pandemic and are expected to return in 2023.

In 2021, LLF held a virtual festival featuring Yann Martel, Fareed Zakaria, Wendy Doniger and others.

The LLF was established in 2013 by Razi Ahmed, and is typically a three-day festival, held at the Alhamra Arts Center. In October 2023, the Government of Punjab appointed Ahmed as chairman of the Lahore Arts Council, which is responsible, among others, for the Alhamra Arts Center, where LLF is usually held.

LLF's governance structure includes a Board of Governors chaired by Iqbal Z. Ahmed. The first edition was a two-day event held on 23 and 24 February 2013. The second edition was held from 21 to 23 February 2014. In 2015, the third edition was held from 20 to 22 February.

== See also ==
- Culture of Lahore
- Festivals in Lahore
- Islamabad Literature Festival
- Karachi Literature Festival
