= Chaand Raat =

Eve of Eid al-Fitr

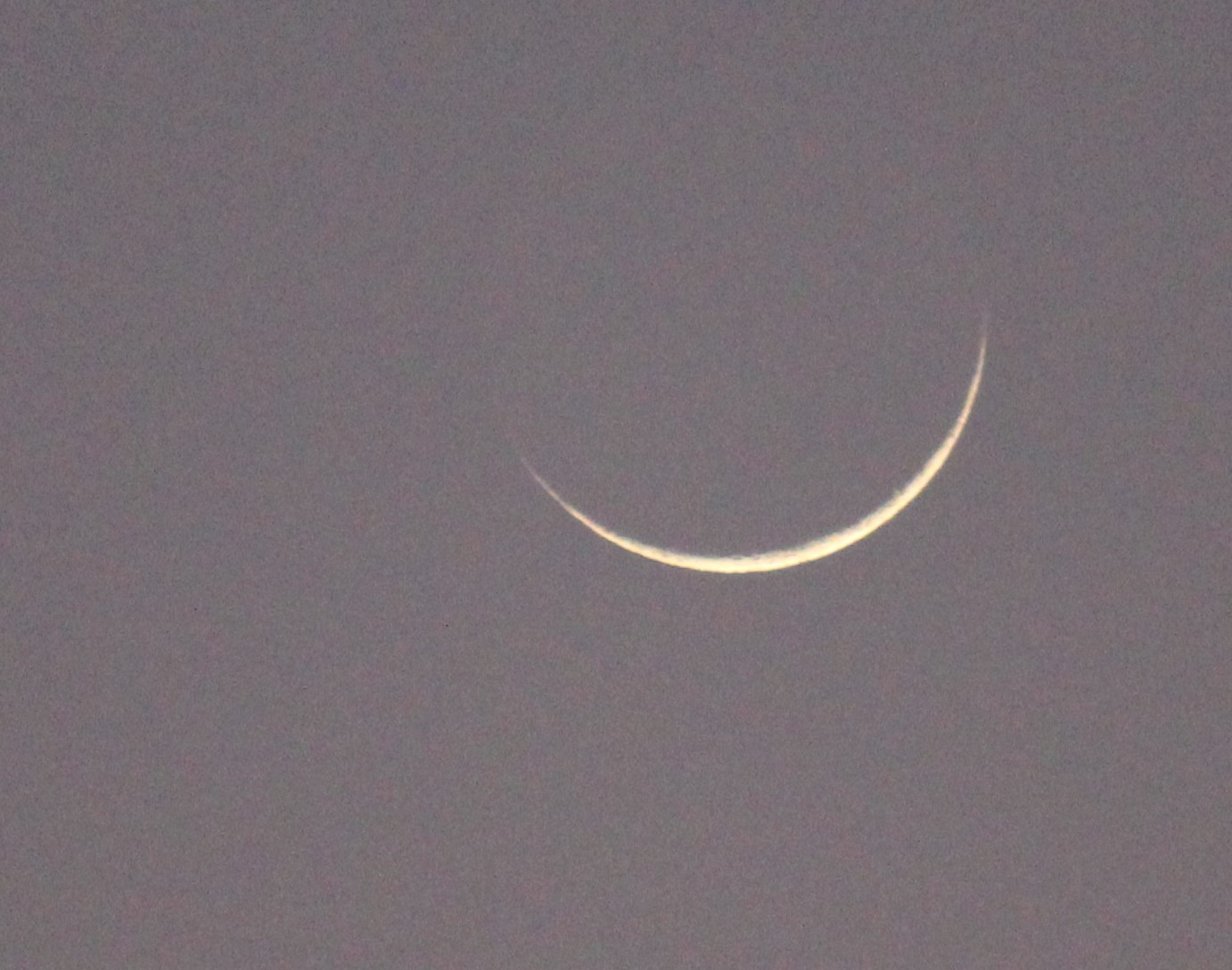
- A crescent moon marking the beginning of the Eid al-Fitr in 2020
- Observed by: Muslims
- Type: (South Asia)
- Related to: Eid al-Fitr, Eid al-Adha

Chaand Raat (Hindustani: [t͡ʃãːd̪ ɾaːt̪], lit. 'Night of the moon') is a South Asian cultural observance on the eve of the festival of Eid al-Fitr; it can also mean a night with a new moon for the new Islamic month Shawwal. Chaand Raat is a time of celebration when families and friends gather in open areas at the end of the last day of Ramadan to spot the new moon, which signals the arrival of the Islamic month of Shawwal and the day of Eid. Once the moon is sighted, people wish each other Eid Mubarak ("Blessings of the Eid day"). Women and girls decorate their hands with mehndi (henna); people prepare desserts for the next day of Eid and do last rounds of shopping. City streets are adorned with festive decorations, and brightly decorated malls and markets remain open late into the night. Chaand Raat is celebrated festively and passionately by Muslims (and occasionally non-Muslims as well) all over South Asia. Its socio-cultural significance is comparable to Christmas Eve.

== Etymology ==
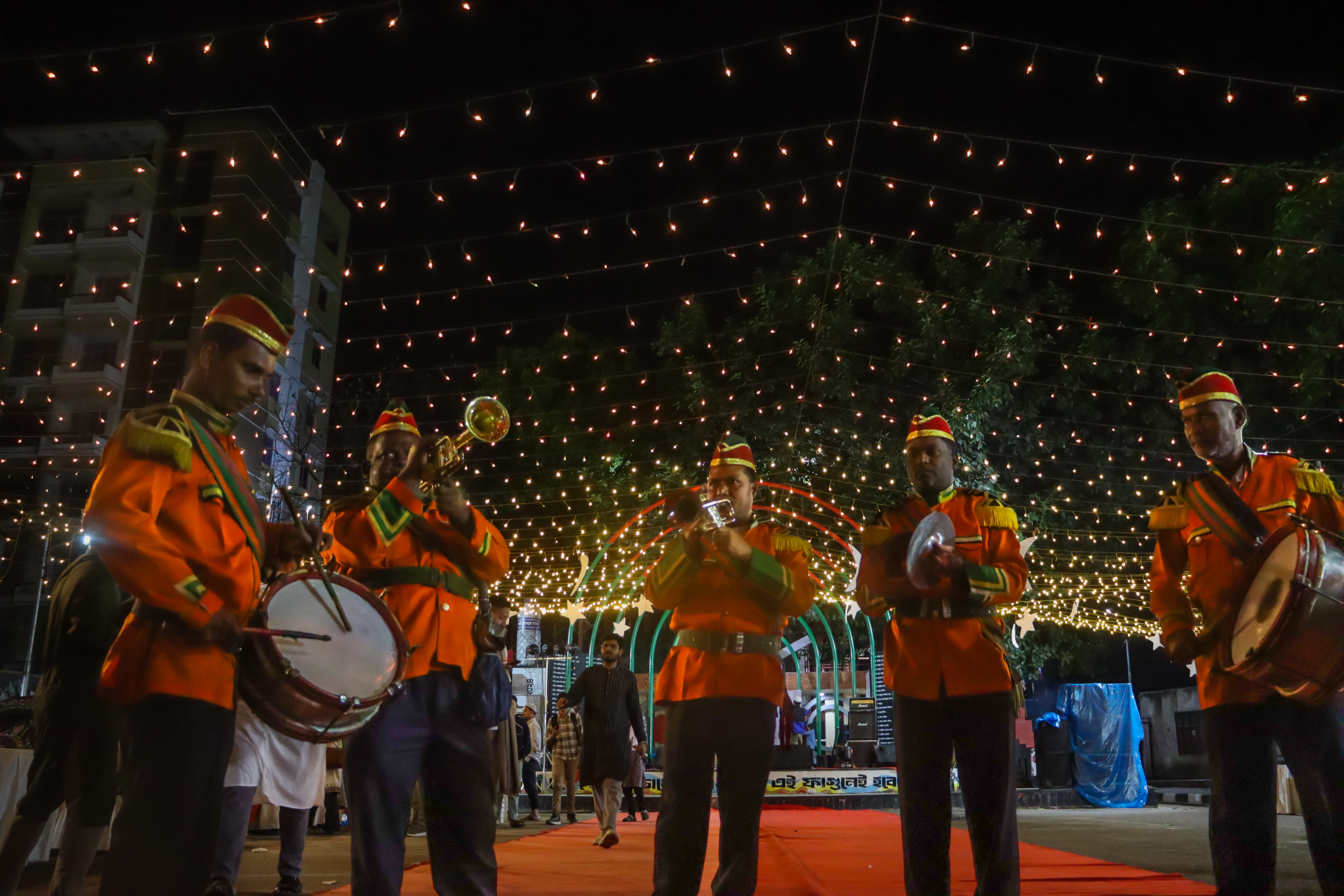
A Chaand Raat celebration in New Dhaka, Bangladesh

The term is derived from the Hindustani chānd rāt (Devanagari: चाँद रात, Nastaʼlīq: چاند رات), literally translating to 'moon night'. The two words are derived from the Sanskrit words candrá (चंद्र) "moon" and rā́tri (रात्रि) "night", respectively.

== Background ==
Chaand Raat celebrations occur on the eve of Eid al-Fitr, which is celebrated on 1 Shawwal. The beginning of an Islamic month depends on the first sighting of the waxing lunar crescent and thus the month of Ramadan can be of either 29 or 30 days. Chaand Raat occurs on the same evening on which first lunar crescent of the month of Shawwal is observed. As the exact day of Eid al-Fitr is dependent on the moon sighting, Chaand Raat is often considered more festive on Eid al-Fitr than Eid al-Adha, which is known well in advance.

== Festivities ==
Once the new moon is sighted, announcements are made from mosques, as well as through television and radio broadcasts. Festivities begin almost instantly and continue all night until the morning Fajr prayer. Entire families head out towards the local bazaars, markets and shopping malls. Shoppers usually purchase last-minute items for Eid, such as shalwar kameez, bangles, jewelry, bags, and shoes. Gifts and sweets are brought for friends while toys are brought for children. Barber shops and beauty parlors are also heavily visited in the evening in preparation for the following day. At home, women and girls decorate their hands with mehndi. People also decorate their homes and begin preparing food for the holiday. Decorative lights are put up in markets as well as government buildings, banks and mosques. Chaand Raat also gives a chance for people to meet with friends and extended family.

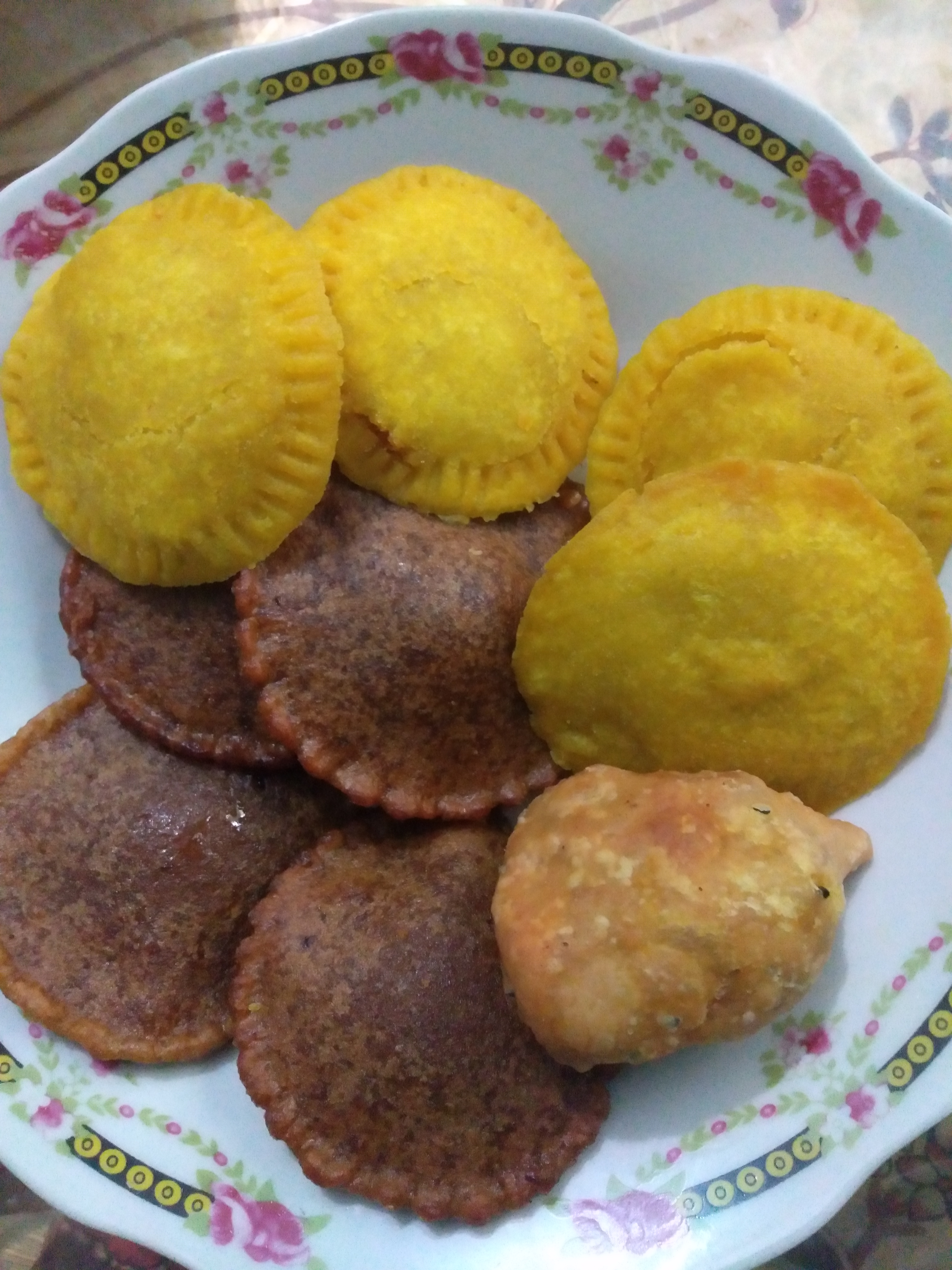
Handesh are made on Chaand Raat for the celebration of the next day's celebration of Eid Al Fitr in Bengali culture

== See also ==
- Laylat al-Jaiza
- Festivals in Bangladesh
- Festivals in Pakistan
- Festivals in India
- Ruet-e-Hilal Committee
- Islam in South Asia
