= Hassan Dars =

Sindhi poet

Hassan Dars Sindhi: حسن درس
- Born: Muhammad Hassan; 5 September 1966; Village Hoothee Mashaekh, Tando Allahyar District, Sindh
- Died: 16 June 2011 (aged 44); Hyderabad, Sindh, Buried at Village Hoothee Mashaekh, Tando Allahyar District, Sindh
- Education: University of Sindh (M.A.)
- Occupation: Poet
- Spouse: Erum Mehboob
- Children: Rohal Hassan Rythem Hassan Roham Cheezal Hassan
- Writing career
- Genre: Romance
- Subject: Poetry

Hassan Dars (حسن درس) was a poet of the Sindhi language’s modern generation. He was born on 5 September 1966 in Village Hoothee Mashaekh (هوٿي مشائخ), Tando Allahyar District, Sindh. He died in road accident on 16 June 2011.

== Background ==
His birth name was Muhummad Hassan. His father’s name was Mewan Ghullam Rasool Dars (ميون غلام رسول درس), who had given him complete freedom of life and responsibilities in his life. He was also a very close relative of Rasool Bux Dars who was like a friend to Hassan Dars and they both shared a lot of similarities. Hassan Dars and Rasool bux Dars used to indulge in a lot of quality conversations. They often used to meet in Jhimpir (village in Sindh district of Pakistan) and would often share their thoughts with each other.

== Education ==
Hassan got his primary education in his native village Hoothee Mashaekh, and for higher education he moved to Hyderabad where he got admission in Muslim College Hyderabad and after intermediate course, he obtained master's degree from University of Sindh, Jamshoro, Sindh.

== Professional career ==
Hassan had versatile talents, he was one of the founder team members of Sindh TV, where he produced, directed and wrote various programs. He worked different jobs and was also associated with United Nations Development Programme - GEF Small Grants Project on old local thoroughbred of Sindhi-Lukhi horse. Under this project he produced a documentary and a book about this thoroughbred of horse. He also made regular appearances on Sindhi television channels and did radio programmes as well. In 1985, he joined the Sindhi daily newspaper 'Sawal', as an editor for five years.

== Literary career ==
Hassan Dars was used to writing blank verses and Ghazals in the Sindhi language for years, but his peak of creativity made him a famous poet of modern Sindhi language in late 90s. As Shaikh Ayaz, a great poet of Sindh had once expressed about Hassan that: “Hassan is a leading poet of future generations of Sindh.” Hassan composed thousands of poems, but they were never published properly. His poems appeared, however, in newspapers and magazines or were heard by fans over the television and radio. He was an expert with metaphors and his genre was mostly romantic poetry, so much so that he was regarded as ‘the poet of young hearts’ by the late Shaikh Ayaz, a 20th-century Sindhi poet. His fans called him “the best poet after Shaikh Ayaz”. In short time Hassan made his own space in Sindhi people with his poetry on nature, romance and revolutionary human behaviors. Most of the readers used to call him 'Poet of Nature'.

== Publications ==
Hassan wrote several articles, poetry in local Sindhi newspapers, [magazines and tabloid, but his first book named: "Hassan Dars jo Risalo" ( حسن درس جو رسالو) a collection of his poetry was launched one year after his death. It was the first publication of his works in the fourth Karachi Literature Festival.

== Death ==
Hassan Dars died on 16 June 2011, after suffering serious wounds in a road accident in the wee hours. He was buried in his native village Hoothee Mashaekh.
