= Culture of Islamabad =

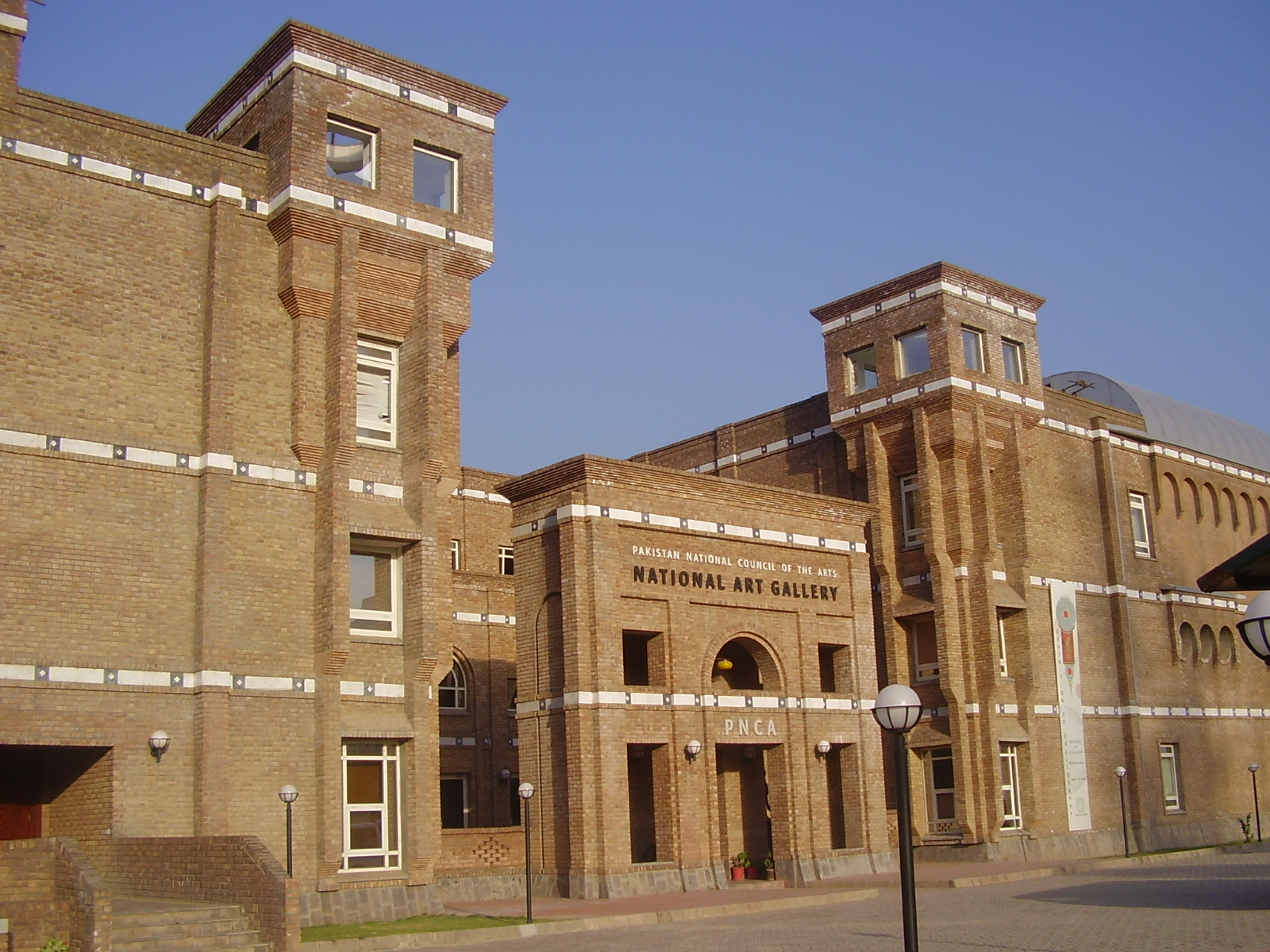
National Art Gallery Islamabad

Islamabad (Urdu: ثقافت اسلام آباد) combines a diverse and heterogeneous set of elements which developed under the influence of Mughal, Iranic, Turkic, Afghan, Central and West Asia cultures and is the capital city of the Islamic Republic of Pakistan. Islamabad lies in a federal territory of its own called Islamabad Capital Territory.

== Cuisine ==
Islamabad is home to many diplomats, government officials and foreign workers and is reflected in their cuisine. Islamabad celebrates food festivals through its ethnic groups with examples such as the Food Festival 2011, Austrian Food Festival 2013 and Swiss Food Festivals. As Pakistan is known for its diverse, traditional food options such as Chicken karahi, Nihari, Seekh kabab, Palaw, Halwa Poori, Daal, Chapli Kebab, Islamabad's cuisine has further developed as they now have foreign franchises such as McDonald's, KFC, Hardee's, Subway, TGI Fridays, Cinnamon Café and China Grill. Fast food chains are as common as traditional food outlets. In Islamabad, many people dine out at restaurants with foreign food, such as Western, Turkish, Mediterranean, Middle Eastern, Arab and Chinese dishes.

Among foreigners and people of a more affluent background are seen in a famous eating area known as Kohsar Market which includes many cafe's and restaurants that range from Pakistani, continental to Thai cuisine.

The class distinction, moreover, has infiltrated not only the residential areas but also the many eateries that Islamabad hosts. Islamabad is home to a majority of Muslims and a minority of Christians. Christians are relegated to slum like neighborhoods in sectors of Islamabad like F-6, F-7, and G-11. Islamabad is a more affluent city at its core yet there are poorer areas within it that have been confined to specific sectors. Islamabad is a city where the government officials reside as it is mostly a political city at the heart of Pakistani politics. There are common eateries for political figures while there are others which are primarily focused on the middle or lower classes.

== Entertainment ==
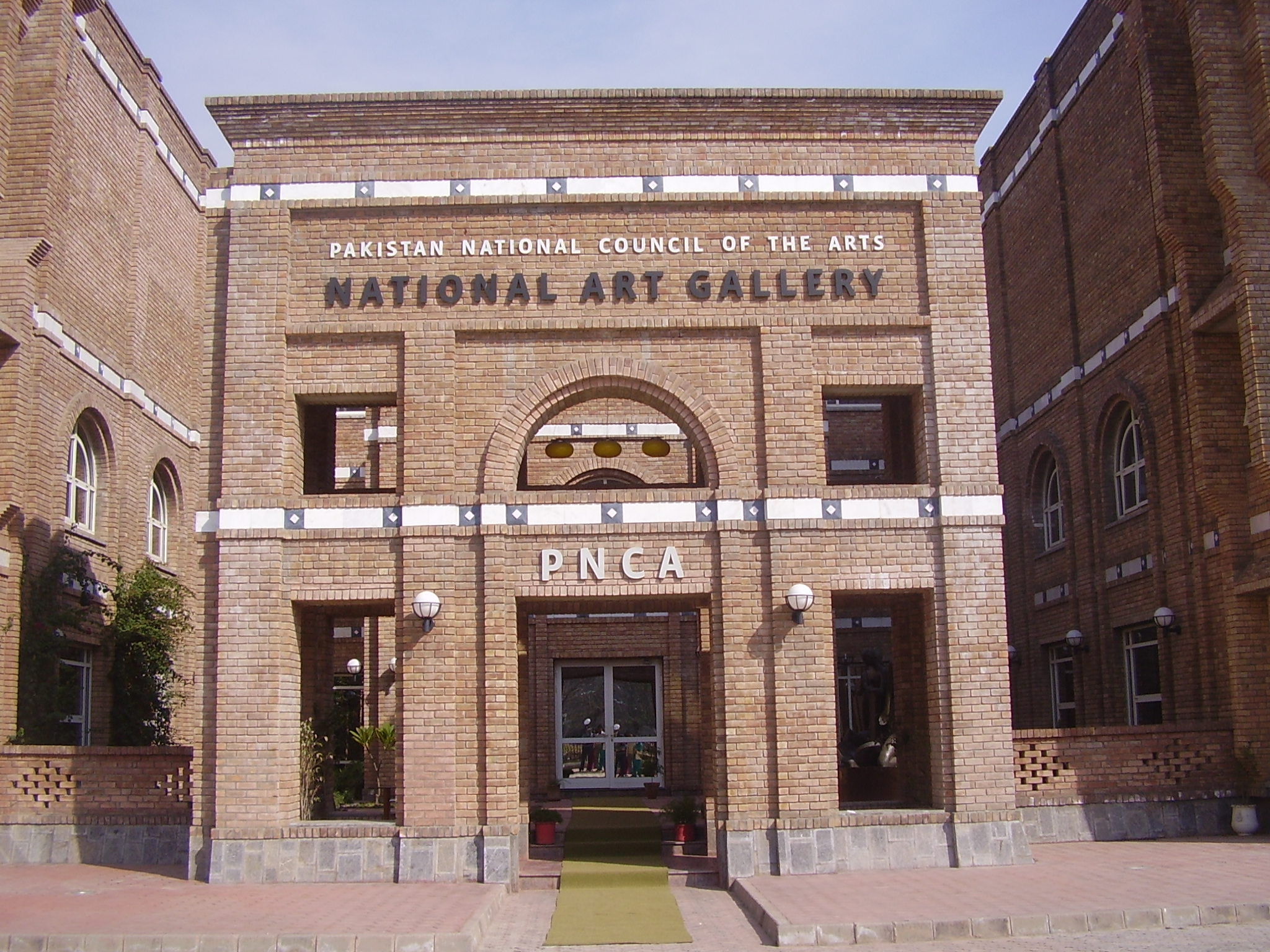
Entrance of the National Art Gallery in Islamabad

Islamabad is frequently mentioned and referred to in popular culture and fiction. The 2010 movie Slackistan is notably based on young teenagers living in Islamabad.

Entertainment facilities in Islamabad include:

- Rawal Lake
- Daman-e-Koh
- Pir Sohawa
- Cinepax Movie Theatre
- F1 Tracks – Go Kart Racing
- Shakarpariyan Hills
- Cloud 9 International Club
- Monal Restaurant
- Centaurus mall
- F-9 Park Mega zone

Islamabad fashion scene mainly focuses on the various designer clothes that fit in with categories such as Mehndi Dressing and Wedding Dressing . The city hosts their annual Islamabad Fashion Week in which renowned designers present their best seasonal collection.

The youth culture in Islamabad is rather hidden. There is a large population of students can be found near Faisal Mosque, and small roadside eateries in the middle of the school day. There are theatre plays and concerts that take place at the Pakistan National Council of Arts which pull a large cross section of society towards them. There are food festivals and handicraft festivals in Islamabad which keep the small population (1.5 million) of the city entertained.

The Lok Virsa Museum is a heritage museum which has made its mark in the city of Islamabad. It is a celebration of many cultures within Pakistan but has a distinct appreciation for its location which is the city that hosts it. Islamabad is known for its greenery and mountains which are its landmark and appreciated by many tourists. As it is a newly developed, planned cities there is not much by way of historical sites of architecture within the city itself, however, the suburbs of the city host one of the oldest Buddhist universities in the world known as Taxila and other Buddhist Stupas. Shakarparian Park is the first amusement park in Islamabad which has a wide array of activities which can be enjoyed by all citizens in Islamabad.

In 2013, Islamabad's first Shopping Mall was opened to the public which led crowds to its doors for many years on a daily basis. The main attraction of the city is the Faisal Mosque which is popular for having the tallest minarets in Asia and is a well-known spot for young people even if they are not visiting for worship.

== See also ==
- Culture of Karachi
- Culture of Lahore
