= Festivals in Multan =

Festivals celebrated in Mulktan Pakistan

Multan, being a rich cultural city in Pakistan, celebrates a number of festivals throughout the year. The most popular festivals are urs Shah Rukn-e-Alam and the Spring Festival, but many other festivals and events are celebrated in the metropolis as well.

== Spring Festival (Jashn-e-Baharaan) ==
The Spring Festival occurs in March. During the event, all city parks are covered with flowers and shows. Cantt Garden is famous for flower shows and exhibitions.

== Basant ==
The Basant is an event featuring kite flying, but it is banned nowadays due to several people having died of cut throats when they encountered kite strings.

== Urs Shah Rukn-e-Alam ==
Urs Shah Rukn-e-Alam is a religious event where people gather at the tomb of Shah Rukn-e-Alam located in the Multan Fort. It occurs annually.

== Urs Bahauddin Zakariya ==
Urs Bahauddin Zakariya is an annual religious event in which people gather around the shrine of Bahauddin Zakariya.

== Urs Shah Shams Tabrizi ==
Urs Shah Shams Tabrizi occurs annually through July 1 to 3.
