= Kara Film Festival =

Annual film festival in Karachi, Pakistan

Coordinates: 24°51′36″N 67°0′36″E

Karachi International Film Festival تہوار بین الاقوامی فلم کراچی
- Location: Karachi, Pakistan
- Language: International
- Website: karafilmfest.com

The Karachi International Film Festival, simply known as the Kara Film Festival (Urdu: کارا فلم فیسٹیول or کارا فلم) was an annual film festival held in Karachi, Pakistan from 2001 until 2009. The festival reportedly started in response to the declining state of the Pakistani film industry. The 10th Kara Film Festival was intended to be held in 2010 but has since been delayed every year due to social issues in Karachi.

The stated goal of the festival was to "promote an appreciation of the art and craft of filmmaking among a wide population as well as to encourage creativity and high standards among filmmakers". The Kara Film Festival was reportedly founded to aid the revival of Pakistani cinema.

The festival featured a variety of independent films, including documentaries, narrative features, and shorts. From the 6th festival onwards, there was also a family-friendly section of children's animated movies. At each festival, a jury would celebrate emerging and renowned filmmakers by awarding their works. One distinctive feature of the festival was that it would also showcase talent from Pakistani artists and musicians.

== Awards ==
A jury awarded films they deemed the best in every category at the closing ceremony of each festival. These categories are:

- Best Documentary
- Best Live Action Short Film
- Best Animated Short Film
- Best Telefilm
- Best Feature Film
- Best Direction
- Best Male Actor in a Leading Role
- Best Female Actor in a Leading Role
- Best Male Actor in a Supporting Role
- Best Female Actor in a Supporting Role
- Best Screenplay
- Best Editing
- Best Cinematography
- Best Musical Score
- Special Jury Award
- Special Jury Award for Acting

== See also ==
- Cineaste One Student Film Festival
- Cinema in Karachi
- Cinema of Pakistan
- Festivals in Karachi
