= Pakistan Flower Show =

Annual flower show and festival in Karachi, Pakistan

The Pakistan Flower Show is an annual flower show and a festival held every year in Karachi, Pakistan. It is held at the Sea View Park in Karachi. It is organized by the Horticulture Society of Pakistan. It was established in 1948 and held every year in February. The 60th festival was held on February 26, 2011, the 61st was held on February 23–26, 2012 and the 68th in February 2019 and opened by Humayun Aziz a Pakistan Army General.
