= Cinéaste One =

Pakistani arts and cultural organization

- Abbreviation: C1
- Predecessor: Kara Film Festival
- Formation: 2012
- Type: Not for profit
- Location: Karachi, Pakistan
- Official language: English, French, Urdu
- President: Rumman Zia
- Vice President: Fakher Butt
- Website: http://cineasteone.org

Cinéaste One is an arts and cultural organization based in Karachi formed for the purpose of establishing an infrastructure to encourage and promote short film making in Pakistan. It organizes workshops and seminars promoting film literacy and produces the Cinéaste One Student Film Festival.

== History ==
Cinéaste One film organization was formed in 2012 after Rumman Zia's 'Cinema 101' workshops became a regular feature of Alliance Francaise de Karachi (AFK) cultural activities.

Zia and AFK agreed to publicly showcase the films coming out of the workshop. Cinéaste One Student Film Festival (COSFF) was produced; highlighting selected short films from workshop participants. The first time filmmaker's efforts were lauded and the affair was deemed a success. Zia decided to capitalize on the event's success. With an eye on cultivating the film scene, a bigger event was launched the following year. Cinéaste One Student Film Festival 2013 (COSFF13) assimilated Karachi's major film schools: SAAMPT, SZABIST, Indus Valley School of Art and Architecture, Iqra University and Cinema 101 workshops, on a single platform, supporting upcoming filmmakers and fashioning a film culture. A film-rating system was developed and an external jury composed of foreign and local artists and filmmakers were assembled. An indie-rock band opened the event and COSFF13 marked a celebration rewarding the best coming out of Karachi's film schools.

The next Cinéaste One Film Festival took place on 20 December 2014.

=== Filmistan ===
In 2015, Cinéaste One organized an art exposition titled Filmistan from 18 April – 25 April. Filmistan featured a series of exhibitions showcasing Pakistani film posters, art and memorabilia from a bygone era. Most of the memorabilia at the exhibition comes from the private collection of an aficianado known as Guddu.

== See also ==
- Kara Film Festival
- Arts Council of Pakistan
