= Muhammad Bux Johar =

Pakistani journalist from Hyderabad, Sindh

- Died: June 2010
- Occupations: Editorialist, Journalist, Science Fiction author
- Years active: 45 years
- Employer(s): Daily newspapers Hilal Pakistan and Aftab
- Organization: Hyderabad Press Club

Muhammad Bux Johar (Sindhi: محمد بخش جوهر) was a Sindhi journalist from Hyderabad, Sindh, who had worked in the media for more than 45 years. He worked as editor of Hilal Pakistan of Karachi, Pakistan and Daily Aftab of Sindh. Also worked for the Sindhi Digest.

His editorials were so powerful on Sindh issues that people pasted them on their city walls. He was eulogized by his fellow professionals in the Hyderabad Press Club as a man of principles, who never compromised on them.

In addition to news editorials, he also wrote books, including translations of Greek mythologies. He delved into Science Fiction too, in Sindhi, writing Flying carpet (Sindhi: اڏام کٽولو), Army of ants (Sindhi: ماڪوڙن جي فوج) and Rampant Holidays (Sindhi: اڏامندڙ ٿالهيون).

Johar retired from active journalism a decade ago when Sindhi daily Aftab was closed down. He died June 2010 in Karachi.

== Books ==
- Karachi jaa ddeeha' aee' raatioo (Sindhi: ڪراچيءَ جا ڏينهن ۽ راتيون ), Days and Nights of Karachi This book is being held up to the world as an aid to understanding Karachi culture.
- Shahzado Gul Muniru: Asulu vado qisso, 1957.
- Doh Aen Saza Jee Tareekh
- Hebatnak Israr

=== Science fiction ===
- اڏام کٽولو Flying Carpet (alternative computer translations of title: Roof Removal, Remove the flight), 1959, Madina Printer Press, Hyperbad
- اڏامندڙ ٿالهيون Rampant Holiday (alternative computer translations of title: Strolling Things, Stunning Things), 1956.
