= Ghazi Salahuddin =

Pakistani journalist and author

- Born: 1939 (age 86–87)
- Citizenship: Pakistan
- Education: University of Karachi
- Occupations: Journalist, TV commentator, writer
- Years active: 1970s — Present
- Employer: Jang Group of Newspapers
- Awards: Pride of Performance Award by the President of Pakistan (2017)

Ghazi Salahuddin (born 1939) (Urdu: غازى صلاح الدين), is a Pakistani journalist, writer, literary figure, and scholar of political science.

== Career ==
He has written various analytical columns, both in Urdu and English, in the News International, Daily Jang and has often appeared on Geo Television for independent commentary on Pakistan's current affairs.

He studied and graduated from the Karachi University. In addition, he served as the President of the Karachi Press Club in 2006.

=== Seminar by journalists ===
In 2018, on World Press Freedom Day, a seminar was organized on the topic of 'Electronic media in Pakistan: challenges and issues' at the Shaheed Zulfikar Ali Bhutto Institute of Science and Technology (Szabist) in Karachi where many journalists participated, including Ghazi Salahuddin, Mazhar Abbas, Imtiaz Alam, and P. J. Mir.

== Awards and recognition ==
- Pride of Performance Award by the President of Pakistan in 2017.
