= Laylat al-Jaiza =

Night preceding the Eid al-Fitr

Laylat al-Jaiza (Arabic: Night of Rewards) is the night preceding the Eid al-Fitr. It has particular significance with the month of Ramadan, providing an opportunity to earn rewards for all the fasts and good deeds in this month. On this night, Islam teaches that the gates of heaven are open and the blessings of God are abundant. As such, they engage in various acts of worship such as performing additional voluntary prayers, reciting the Quran, seeking forgiveness from God, and making supplications for blessings and mercy.

According to Islamic tradition, Laylat al-Jaiza is one of the five nights during which prayers and supplications are not rejected. This is why observant Muslims spend the night praying and performing acts of worship, hoping to earn rewards from God for their efforts during the month of Ramadan. The Islamic prophet Muhammad set an example for Muslims by spending this night in prayer and supplication. He would perform nafl (optional) prayers, recite the Quran, and seek forgiveness from God. He would also perform the Tahajjud prayers, which are optional prayers recommended to be performed in the later hours of the night.

Imam Sadiq is of the view that forgiveness and salvation descends on the fasting person on this night and not on the night of power.

Muhammad is reported to have said in a hadith in Sunan ibn Maja:

Whoever stands up (in worship) in the nights preceding the two Eids expecting rewards from his Lord, his heart will not die when the other hearts will die.
