= Future Fest Pakistan =

Annual science and technology festival

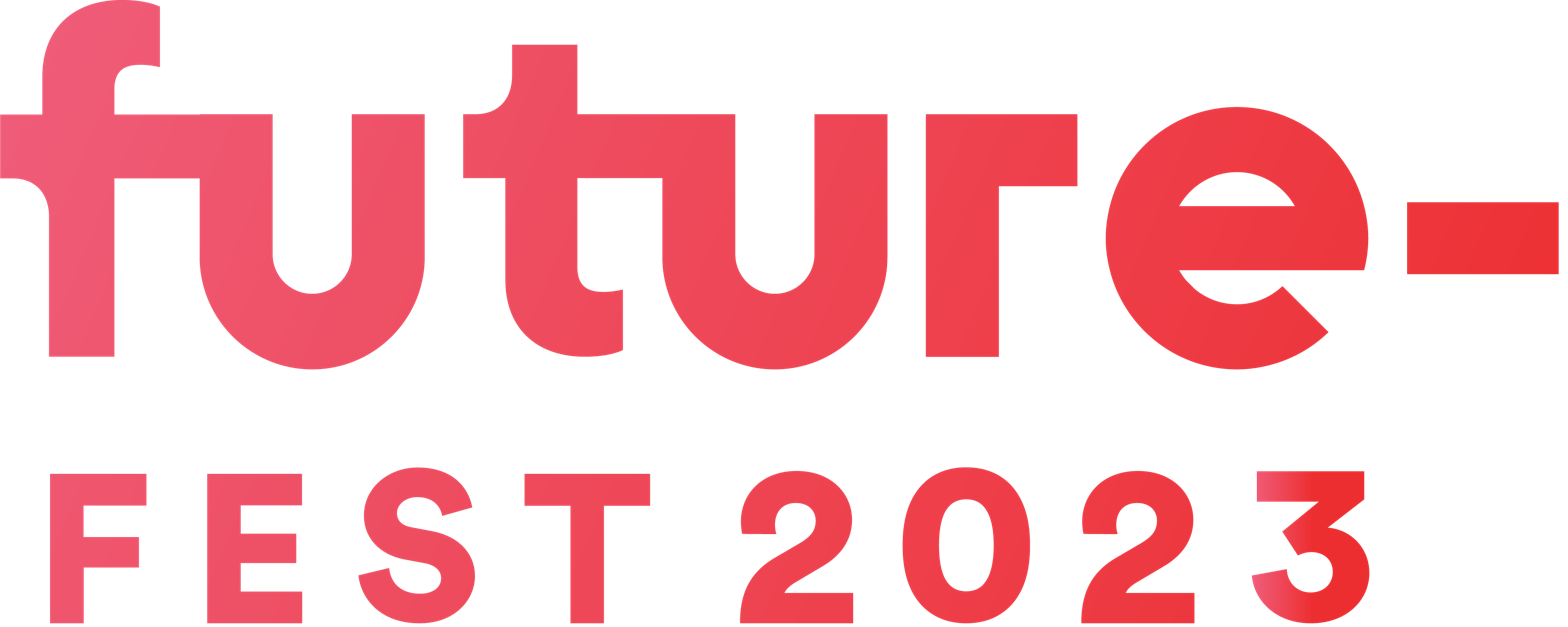
- Genre: Technical Festival
- Country: Pakistan
- Years active: 2022–present
- Founded: 2022
- Founders: Arzish Azam
- Major events: Technology
- Sponsor: BankIslami
- Website: https://www.futurefest.pk

Future Fest Pakistan formerly known as Zindigi Future Fest is the annual science and technology festival. The event was founded by Arzish Azam in 2022.

On 13 May, President of Pakistan Dr. Arif Alvi inaugurated Future Fest 2022 in Islamabad

Future Fest hosts events of Web3 and technology related. The workshops conducted are: Ethical Hacking, Cloud Computing, Internet of Things (IOT), Crypto, WEB3 and IT etc.

== History ==
=== Zindigi Future Fest 2022 ===
Ministry of Science and Technology (Pakistan) partnered with Binance to hold Future Fest 2022, The news was announced from the Ministry of Science and Technology Twitter page. Expo held on March 25, 26 and 27 in Islamabad.
