= Islamabad Literature Festival =

The Islamabad Literature Festival (میلہ ادبیات اسلام آباد) is an international literary festival held annually in Islamabad, Pakistan.

== History ==
ILF was established in 2013. It features prominent literary figures, guest speakers and attendees including writers, poets, scholars and academics from all over Pakistan, as well as internationally. The event incorporates reading and literary debate sessions, lectures, poetry reading, plays, art fairs and book launches. Like the Karachi Literature Festival, ILF is also organised and produced by the Oxford University Press, Pakistan.

== Editions ==
The first ILF was held on April 30 and 31, 2013. The second edition was held from 25 to 28 April 2014. The third edition was held from April 24 to 26, 2015.

== See also ==
- Culture of Islamabad
- Karachi Literature Festival
- Sindh Literature Festival
