= Moriro ain Mangermachh =

Sindhi folktale

Moriro ain Mangermachh (Sindhi: مورڙو ۽ مانگر مڇ) is a Sindhi folktale story about the valor and inventive technique by which the hero Moriro (the fisherman-seeker) killed a sea-monster Mangermachh (Alligator) by diving deep in an especially built iron cage.

The brave fisherman went into the sea to bring back his six dead brothers, who had been swallowed one after one by the devouring mangermachh.

== Synopsis ==
The story is believed to have occurred in the 11th century, during the rule of Soomra dynasty. It is also written by the famous Sindhi sufi poet Hazrat Shah Abdul Latif Bhittai.

In the good old days, there was a village of fishermen called Kalachi. The villagers' main source of subsistence was fishing; they used to row their boats deep into the sea to catch fish. In the locality (now known as Clifton) was a hazardous whirlpool called 'Kalachi jo Kun', meaning the 'Vortex of Kalachi'. Boats would get caught and sink deep into the vortex. Once, a mangermachh took abode in the whirlpool and it devoured the crew of the boats, caught in the whirlpool.

There was another village of fishermen known as Sonmiani 60 miles away from Kalachi. There lived in a fisherman named Aoubhayo (Sindhi: اوڀايو) with his wife Mai Kolachi. They had seven sons, all strong and well-built, except for his youngest son Moriro, who was of short stature and handicapped; as such he was not taken fishing. His six brothers used to go for their catch early in the morning and return after sunset.

One day they did not return home. It worried the villagers. They went out to search and discovered that their boats were caught by the whirlpool and the Mangermachh had devoured them. Learning about the tragic death of his brothers, Moriro, though handicapped, resolved to take revenge and rid the villagers of the calamitous monster. He got an iron-cage made, fitted with pointed spikes on its outside and tied with strong ropes. The ropes were fastened to the necks of two strong male buffaloes. He sat inside the cage and it was lowered in the whirlpool. He instructed the villagers to pull out the cage when he shook ropes inside.

As the cage was lowered, the fish, seeing prey, pounced on it to swallow it. It got hooked and pierced with spikes. Moriro shook the ropes and the cage was pulled out along with the monster alligator enmeshed with the cage. Villagers incised its stomach and brought out remains of all the dead brothers and buried them near the northeast side of Kalachi, at the foot of the mountain, and Moriro spent rest of his life as keeper of their graves.

The place even today is called the "Graveyard of Moriro". It is two miles from Karachi, near the cremation ground of Hindus.

== Legacy of Moriro ==
The great mystic poet of Sindh Shah Abdul Latif Bhittai has used the tale to elucidate his religiosity and spirituality by combining his visionary gleams to the tale.

The Poet does not narrate the tale, but appropriates certain situations, events, and some distinct features of the tale having rich implication. They stand for more than what they are on the surface and hint at a larger meaning. It is a dramatization of forces of good and evil in the human soul.

The symbolization of the inner struggle of man with a beast in him, who spiritually devours him and a whirlpool, where soul sinks on his spiritual voyage. With suggestion the poet evokes ideas, feelings, over and above the actual sense and sound of the word. Sea could be interpreted as a symbol of infinity, the other world as well as this world, the mystery of life and death, the enigma beyond comprehension, and whale as man's base self.

The Town Municipal Committee Moriro Mirbahar (TMC Moriro Mirbahar) is a local government body in Karachi, Pakistan, responsible for providing municipal services within its designated jurisdiction. It is one of the 26 Town Municipal Corporations established in Karachi under the Sindh Local Government Act, 2021. The committee is named after Moriro Mirbahar, a legendary hero from Sindhi folklore.

== See also ==
- Mai Kolachi
- Mohenjo Daro (film)
