= Karachi Literature Festival =

Book Fair in Pakistan

Karachi Literature Festival میله ادبیات کراچی
- Nickname: KLF
- Status: Active
- Frequency: Annually
- Venue: Carlton Hotel (2010 - 2012); Beach Luxury Hotel (2013) – present)
- Location: Karachi
- Country: Pakistan
- Years active: 2010-present
- Inaugurated: 2010
- Founder: Oxford University Press (Pakistan); Ameena Saiyid (co-founder); Asif Farrukhi (co-founder)
- Most recent: 6-8 February 2026
- Attendance: approx. 5,000 (2010); 10,000 (2011); 15,000 (2012); 50,000 (2013); 70,000 (2014)
- Organiser: Oxford University Press Pakistan & British Council (2010 - 2012); Oxford University Press Pakistan (2013 - present)
- Website: www.karachiliteraturefestival.com

Karachi Literature Festival (KLF) is an annual international literary festival held in Karachi, Pakistan. It is the first festival of its kind in Pakistan. It is one of the world's youngest and fastest growing literary festivals. As of 2026, seventeen editions have been held.

== About Karachi Literature Festival ==
The First Karachi Literature Festival (KLF) was organised by Oxford University Press (Pakistan) in collaboration with British Council in March 2010. Inspired by the success of the first two festivals (2010 and 2011), the Children's Literature Festival (CLF) was launched at the end of 2011. Thus the momentum that began in Pakistan with KLF leading, also saw the Islamabad Literature Festival (ILF) being launched in 2013, further followed by the Teachers' Literature Festival in 2014, and many others following their example. This momentum reflects the depth of Pakistan's literary and cultural roots, and the desire and energy to celebrate the pursuit of knowledge, understanding, and creativity. In celebration of Pakistan's 70th birthday, and for the first time, KLF was held outside Pakistan, in London, in May 2017 at the Southbank Centre as part of the Alchemy Festival, in partnership with Oxford University Press Pakistan, the Southbank Centre, Rukhsana Ahmad, and Bloomsbury Publishing (Pakistan) (whose KLF London team were Nadir Cheema, Nigham Shahid and Tariq Suleman).

== Organisers ==
It is organised by Oxford University Press (Pakistan) and the festival co-founders Ameena Saiyid, Asif Farrukhi.

== Mission ==
KLF seeks to create an intellectual space in which the diversity and pluralism in Pakistan's society and this is expressed by the authors from literary and cultural traditions beyond Pakistan's borders are freely accessible to people in an open and participatory manner.

== Objectives ==
- To represent intellectual traditions and cultural diversity through languages and academic disciplines.
- To create a forum for intellectual dialogue and inter-cultural harmony through celebration of writing, publications, and performing arts.
- To provide opportunities through which the world can see and connect with the literature, culture, and social ethos of Pakistan, and from which Pakistan can encounter what is happening in the world.
- To promote artistic expression and emerging Pakistani and international literary talent
- To encourage counter narratives, cross-pollination of ideas, and apolitical views
- To reclaim public space in Karachi for literary and cultural exchanges

== Format ==
The festival consists of literary discussions, book launches, and creative writing workshops. There is also an opportunity to meet a galaxy of authors, get some book signings done and visit a book fair.

== Dates ==
- 2010: March: 20 & 21
- 2011: February: 5 & 6
- 2012: February: 11 & 12
- 2013: February: 15, 16 & 17
- 2014: February: 7, 8 & 9
- 2015: February: 6, 7 & 8
- 2016: February: 5, 6 & 7
- 2017: February: 10, 11 & 12
- 2018: February: 9, 10 & 11 (approximately 225,000 people visited this festival in 2018)
- 2019: March: 1, 2 & 3
- 2020: 28, 29 February & 1st March
- 2022: March: 4, 5 & 6
- 2023: February: 17, 18 & 19
- 2024: February: 16, 17 & 18
- 2026: February: 6, 7 & 8

== Award ==
In 2011, the festival organisers announced the Karachi Literature Festival (KLF) Prize for Best Non-Fiction Book in English. The book has to have been published in the preceding year. The award carries a monetary award of Rs. 100,000. In 2014, the award was raised to Rupees 150,000.

=== 2011 ===
- Jury: Zubeida Mustafa, Ghazi Salahuddin and Dr Jaffer Ahmad.
- Winner: 'The Culture of Power and Governance of Pakistan (1947-2008)’ by Ilhan Niaz – Published by: Oxford University Press, Karachi 2010.

== First Festival (2010) ==
The inaugural event was held on 20 March 2010. Amongst the writers who participated were: Aamer Hussein; Mohammad Hanif; Mohsin Hamid; Samina Quraeshi, Fahmida Riaz and Bapsi Sidhwa. Also featuring noted poets and authors like Iftikhar Arif and Intezar Hussain, Ghazi Salahuddin and journalists like Mujahid Barelvi.

== Second Festival (2011) ==
This year's festival participants included: Aamer Hussein; Mohammad Hanif; Mohsin Hamid; Sara Suleri; Tahira Abdullah; Muneeza Shamsie; Noorjehan Bilgrami; Bina Shah; Zahida Hina; Kamila Shamsie; Anita Ghulam Ali; Daniyal Mueenuddin; Yasmeen Hameed; Maleeha Lodhi, Ayesha Siddiqa; Kishwar Naheed; Asif Noorani; Sheema Kirmani; Madeeha Gauhar; Imtiaz Hussain; Zehra Nigah; H. M. Naqvi; Ali Sethi; Amjad Islam Amjad; Hassan Dars; Ali Akbar Natiq; Mudassar Bashir; Attiya Dawood and Jean-Luc Racine. The plenary session was conducted by Karen Armstrong.

With 2011 declared 'Year of Faiz Ahmed Faiz', the festival paid tribute to him. The poet's grandson, Ali Madeeh Hashmi, talked about him as did the writers Zehra Nigah and Ali Sethi. The band Laal closed out the festivities.

== Fifth Festival (2014) ==
This year's participants included the famous historian from India Rajmohan Gandhi, keynote speaker was author Robert Fisk along with over 100 Pakistani writers and 30 international writers from eight countries. It saw the launch of 30 books by many noted authors.

== Thirteen Festival (2022) ==
The inaugural event was held on 4 March 2022. The 13th edition of the KLF held at the Beach Luxury Hotel is a three-day event on 4, 5, and 6 March. The theme of 13th edition is Separation, Belonging and Beyond: 75 years of Pakistan.

== See also ==
- Islamabad Literature Festival
- Sindh Literature Festival
