= Festivals in Lahore =

Lahore festival

Lahore, as a cultural center of Pakistan, celebrates several festivals specific to the city. It is known for the festivals of Basant and Mela Chiraghan, but many others are celebrated in the metropolis as well.

== Jashn-e-Baharaann (Basant) ==
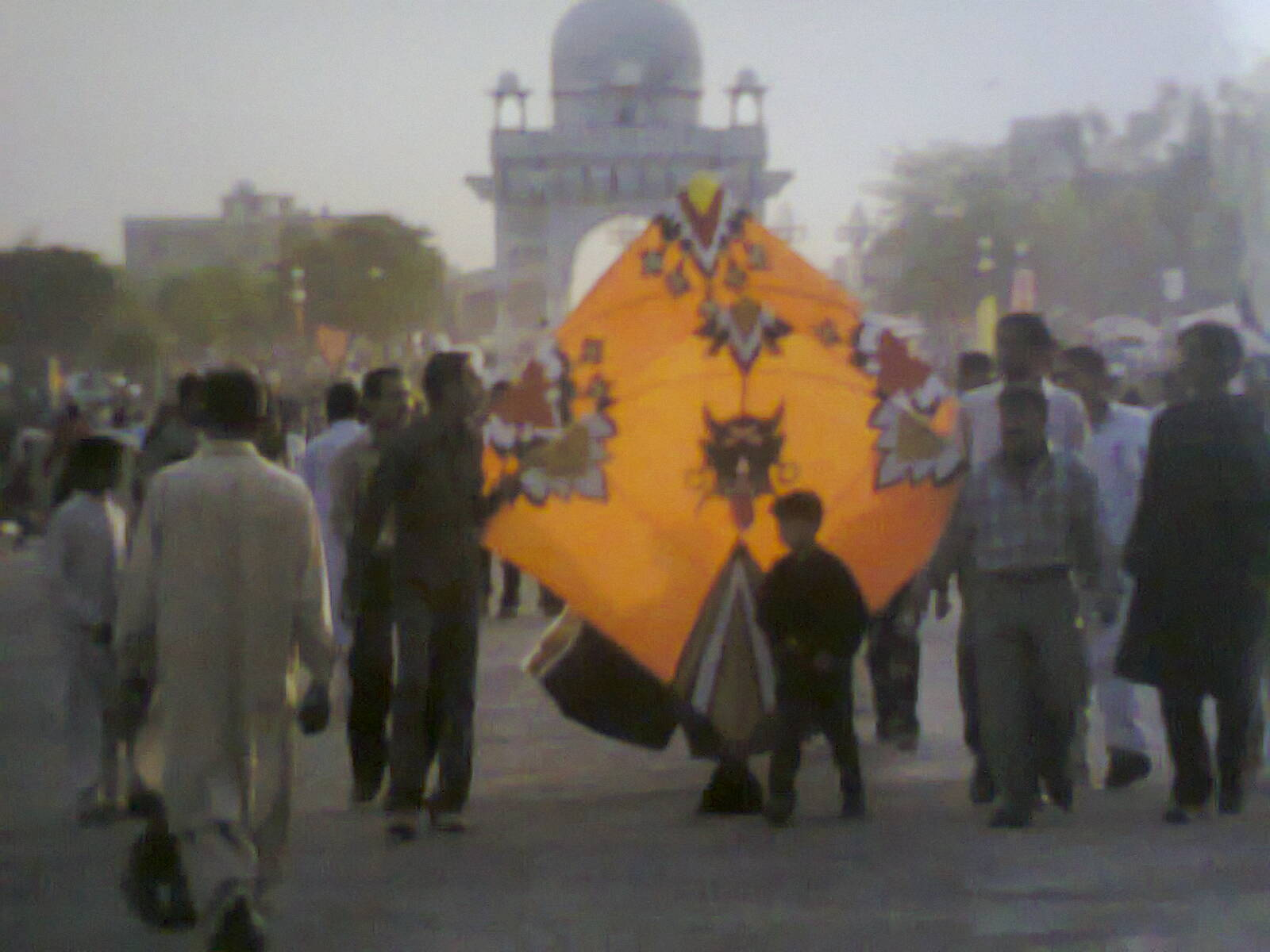
Basant kite

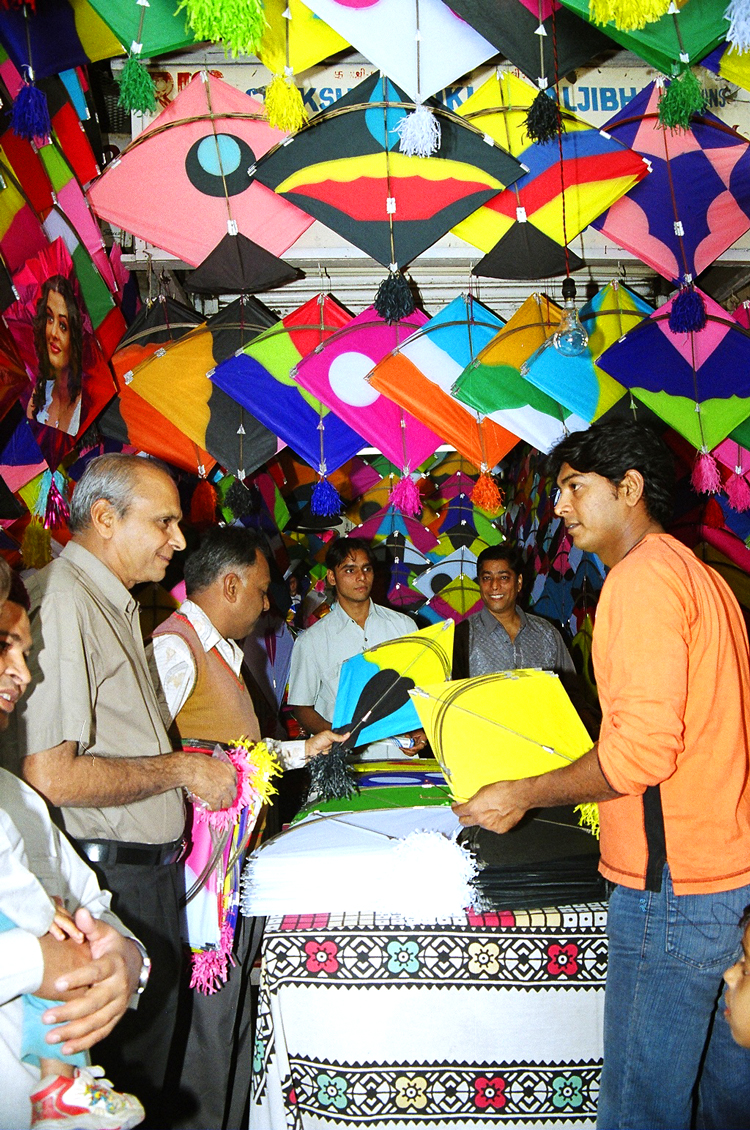
Kite vendors

The biggest, or perhaps the best known festival is that of Jashn-e-Baharaan held in February each year. It is a Punjabi festival celebrating the onset of the spring season, also called the Basant Festival of kites. This festival is celebrated with kite flying competitions all over the city, especially in the Walled City area. Every year the sky fills with colorful kites of all shapes and sizes flown from rooftops. The kites are flown on strings called "Dorr" which is a special thread prepared with powdered glass, rice and gum which serves to cut the thread of competitor kites more effectively. Some of the kite-flying competitions get extremely serious. Women, on this day are seen wearing a bright yellow dress up to the hilt.

Basant was banned in 2007 due to deaths from kite string. People kept defying the ban though which resulted in accidents. In August 2024, the Punjab Home Department declared kite flying and its business a non-bailable offence. In 2026, the ban was lifted and the country celebrated its first Basant in 19 years.

== Mela Chiraghan ==
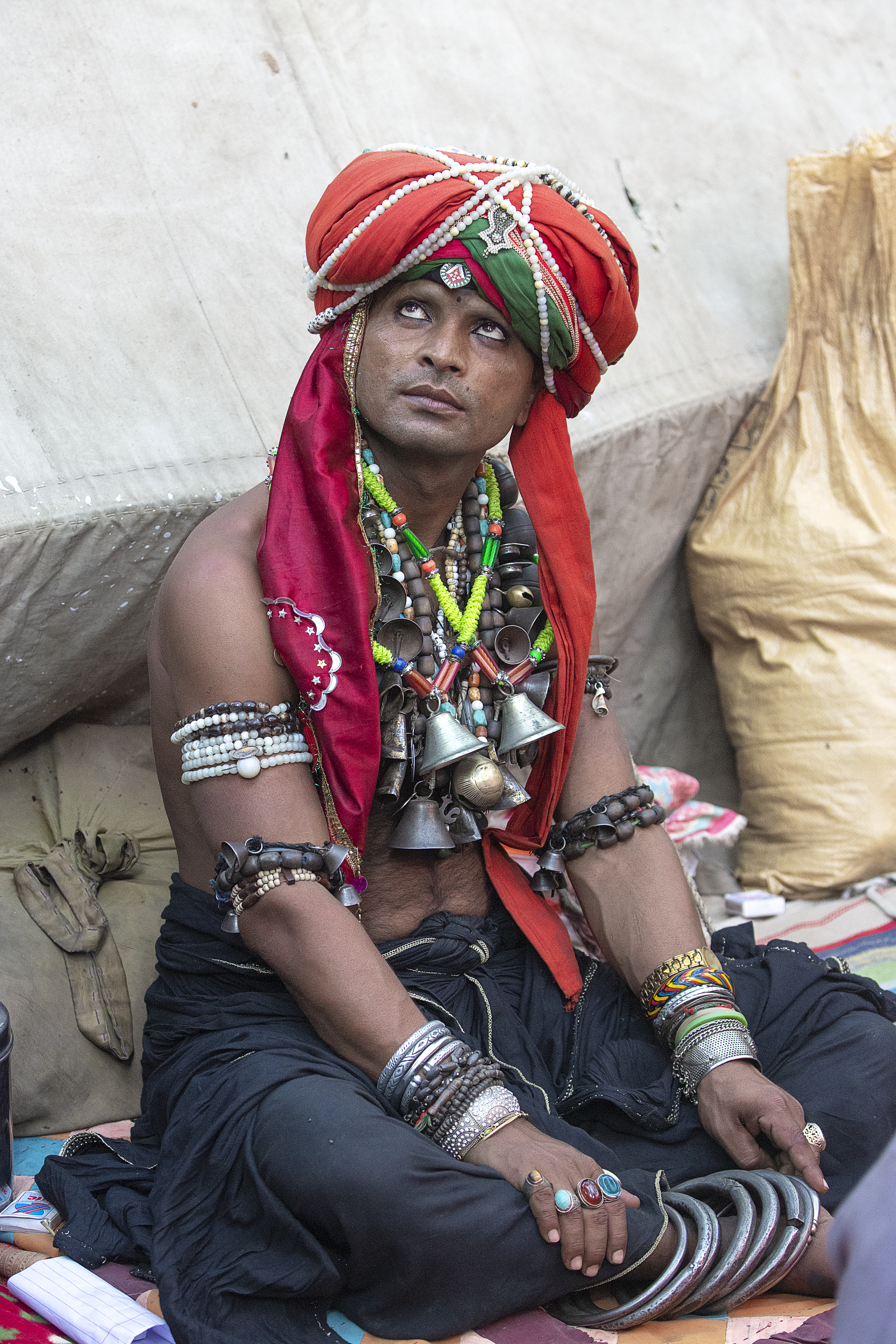
A malang at Mela Chiraghan.

Mela Chiraghan or Mela Shalamar (Festival of Lights) is a three-day annual festival to mark the urs (death

anniversary) of the Punjabi Sufi poet and saint Shah Hussain. It takes place at the shrine of Shah Hussain in Baghbanpura, on the outskirts of Lahore, Pakistan, adjacent to the Shalamar Gardens. The festival used to take place in the Shalimar Gardens also, until President Ayub Khan ordered against it in 1958.

This festival used to be the largest festival in the Punjab, but now comes second to Basant.

== National Horse and Cattle Show ==
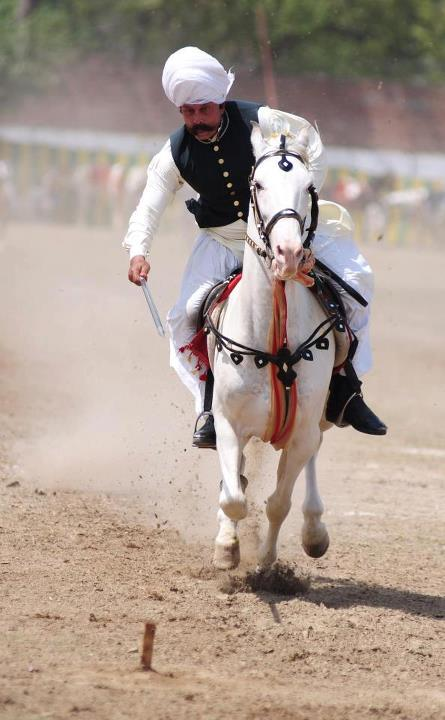
Malik Ata Muhammad Khan at the Lahore Horse and Cattle Show

The show is held at Fortress Stadium in the third week of November for 5 days. Activities in the event include cattle races, cattle dances, tent pegging, tattoo show, folk music, dances, bands, cultural floats and folk games.

Activities include a display parade of animals, dances by horses and camels, polo matches, dog shows and their races, vaudeville acts of stuntmen, the mass display of the military band, rhythmical physical exercise by the children, decorated industrial floats and torch light tattoo shows. The show began as a modest exhibition organized by the army to project the cattle wealth of the country in the early fifties, and today is used to display quality livestock.

Today it is an international event to which come dignitaries from abroad and visitors and foreign tourists. The organizing committee comprises representatives of a number of agencies including army, rangers, LMC schools, the police, industrialists and the art councils.

== World Performing Arts Festival ==
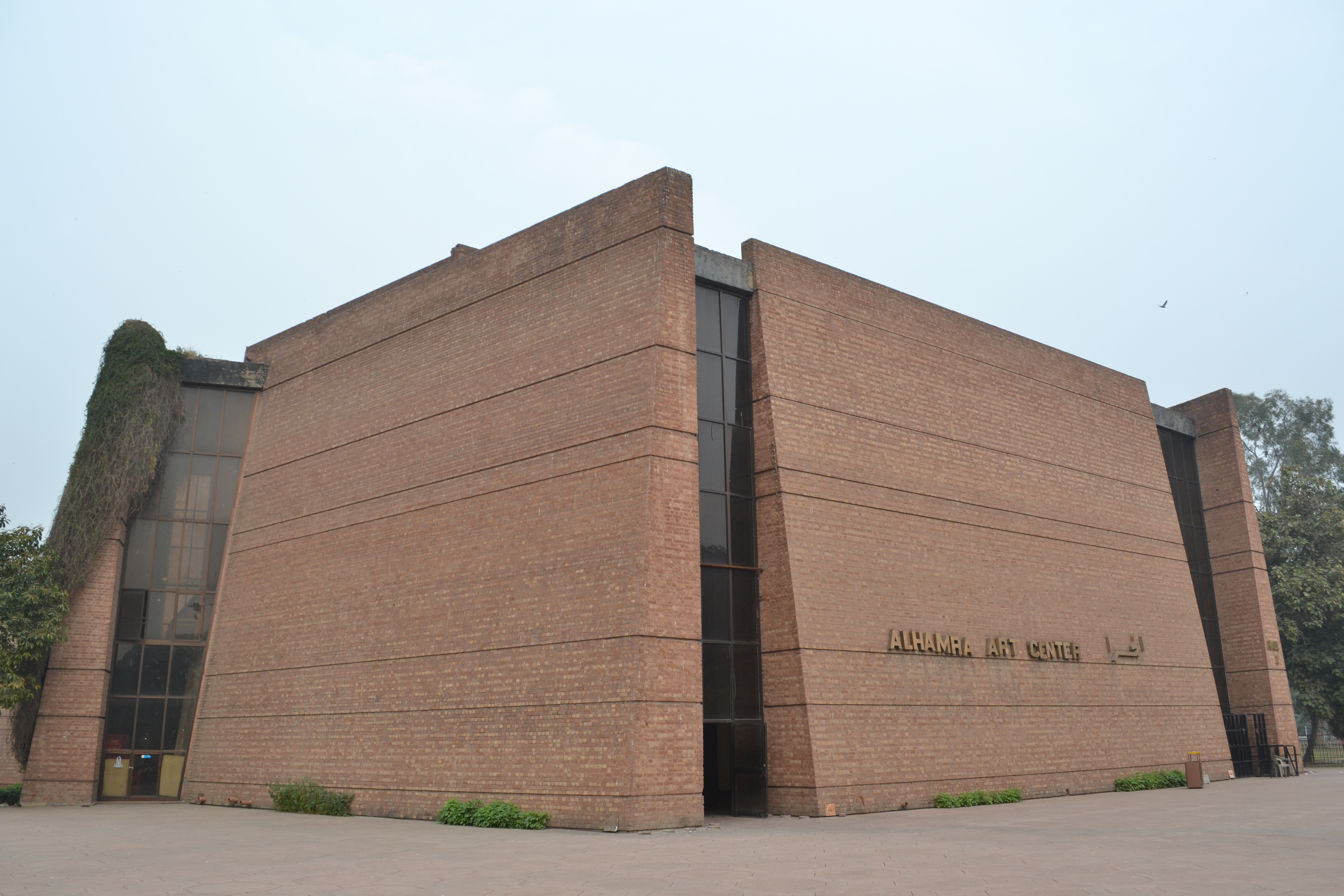
Alhamra Arts Council, where the World Performing Arts Festival and Lahore Literary Festival are annually held.

The World Performing Arts Festival is held every autumn (usually in November) at the Alhamra Arts Council, a large venue consisting of several theatres and amphitheatres. This ten-day festival consists of musicals, theatre, concerts, dances, solos, mime and puppet shows. The festival has an international flavour with nearly 80 percent of the shows performed by international performers. On average 15-20 different shows are performed every day of the festival.

== Lahore Literary Festival ==
The grounds at Lahore Literary Festival 2026

The Lahore Literary Festival (LLF) is an annual three-day literature festival run by the Alhamra Arts Council since 2013. The festival has been described in the literary world as hosting "some of the most exciting voices in South Asian literature, journalism, and public life." Events include discussion on Pakistani literature, talks on history, literature, translation, law, heritage, and culture by national and international authors, food stalls, and book markets.

== Women's Excellence Awards ==
This event is a celebration of women who are seen as geniuses, leaders, inspirational, and/or have overcome the most extreme adversity. The event aims to inspire youth through recognition of the achievements of these women.

The First Ever Women's Excellence Awards are Organized by Youth Revolution Clan and Kinnaird College for Women. Awardees Include:

- Dr. Rukhsana David (Principal Kinnaird College)
- Dr. Fauzia Viqar (Chairperson Commission on Status for Women Government of the Punjab)
- Sabah Sadiq (Minister for Social Welfare)
- Ms. Sadia Naseem Ghazala (Deputy Director Anti Corruption)
- Syeda Henna Babar Ali (Social worker, poet, writer, Advisor, Consumer Products Division, Packages Limited)
- Ms. Farhat Mashhood (CEO Zoha Foundation)
- Khawer Sultana (Akhuwat Foundation)
- Sabahat Rafique (CEO United We Reach)
- Sowaba Shehzad (President Women German Chamber of Commerce)
- Musarat Misbah (CEO Depilux)
- Dr. Shehla Javed Akram
- Afshan Sultan (Hayyat Foundation)
- Dr. Sadaf Attique
- Maha Jamil (Chairperson YRC)
- Shameelah Ismail (CEO Ghar Par)

The event is founded (Chairman Youth Revolution Clan)], Maha Jamil (Co-chair YRC) and Ms. Sair S. Farooqi (Head of Business Studies Department Kinnaird College). The event was co-organized by Mehwish Haroon (President Kinnaird Entrepreneurial Club) with Asfand Yar Naseer (President YRC) .Official partners Include United We Reach, HospitAll, Hayat Foundation and Azeem raza Photography.

== National ==
- Pakistan Day (23 March): A military parade takes place to commemorate the anniversary of the Pakistan Resolution passed on March 23, 1940.
- Independence Day (14 August): Meetings, processions, rallies, decorations, and illustrations.
- Defence Day (6 September): Parades and exhibitions of military equipment. Visits to the war memorials.
- Air Force Day (7 September): Display of the latest aircraft of the Pakistan Air Force and air shows.

== Religious ==
- Eid ul-Fitr
- Eid ul-Adha
- Eid Milad-un-Nabi
- Shab-e-Barat
- Ashura
- Vaisakhi
- Christmas

== Others ==
- National Industrial Exhibition Lahore (3rd week of November for 15 days): Held at Fortress Stadium, Lahore. Exhibition and sale of industrial products and handicrafts of Pakistan.
- Punjab Sports Festival, a divisional level annual sports festival.
- Faiz Ahmad Faiz Mela/Festival .In honor of the late poet Faiz.
- Ali Arshad Mir Mela/Festival. In honor of epic Punjabi Poet Prof. Ali Arshad Mir.
