= Mela Chiraghan =

Festival in Lahore, Pakistan

Mela Chiraghan or Mela Shalimar (Punjabi: میلہ چراغاں; "Festival of Lights") is a three-day annual festival to mark the urs (death anniversary) of the Punjabi poet and Sufi saint Shah Hussain (1538 – 1599) who lived in Lahore in the 16th century.

It takes place at the shrine of Shah Hussain in Baghbanpura, on the outskirts of Lahore, Pakistan, adjacent to the Shalimar Gardens. The festival was held in the Shalimar Gardens, until President Ayub Khan ordered against it in 1958.

This used to be the largest festival in the Punjab, but now comes second to Basant. Peasants, Mughal rulers, the Punjabi Sikh residents and even the British officers during their British Raj used to show up at this festival. Maharaja Ranjeet Singh (13 Nov 1780 – 27 June 1839) had high respect for this 16th century sufi saint Shah Hussain. In the early half of the 19th century, during the Sikh rule in Punjab, Maharaja Ranjit Singh used to lead a procession from the Lahore Fort to this festival site.

== Gallery ==
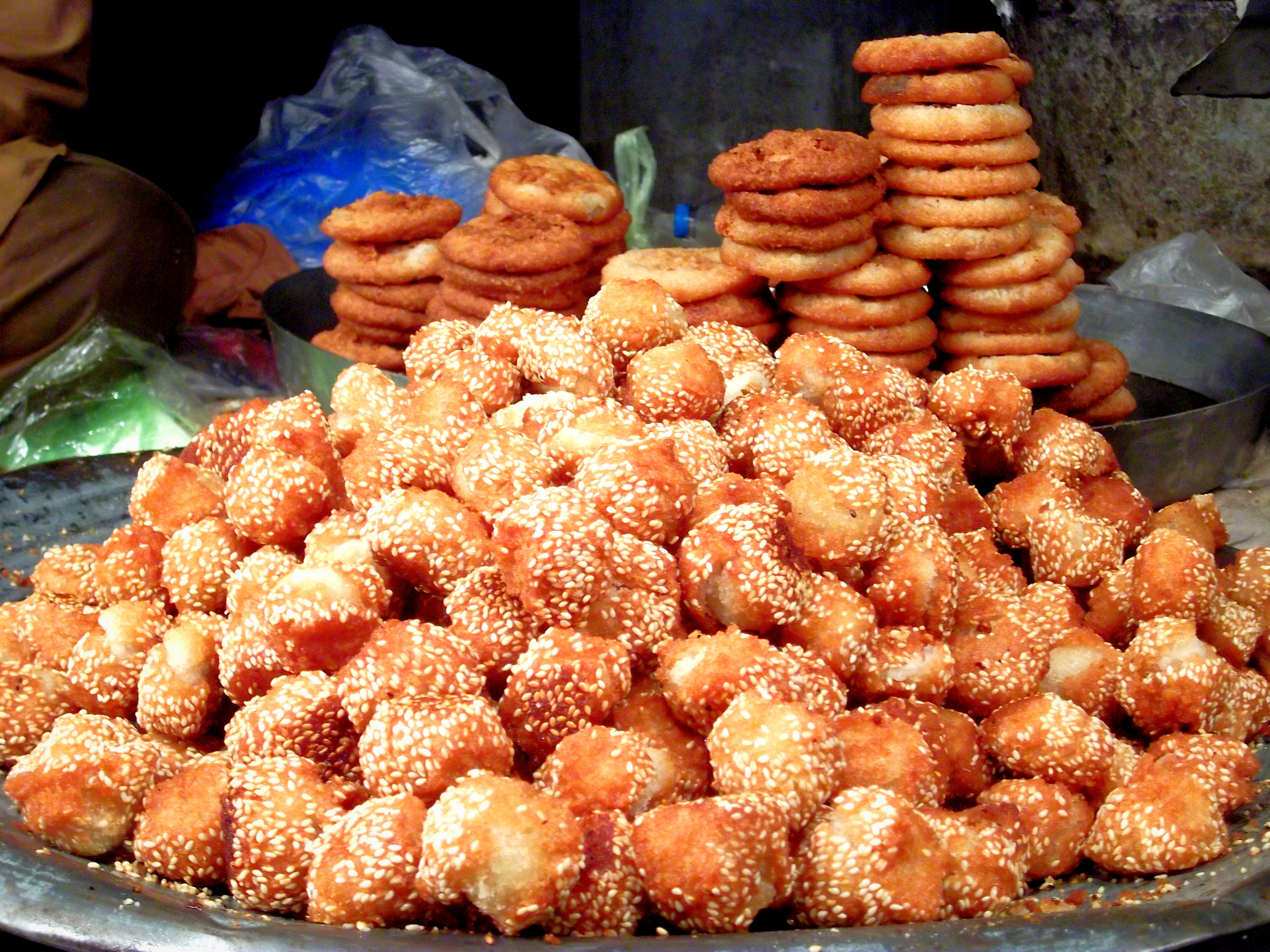
Folk cuisine

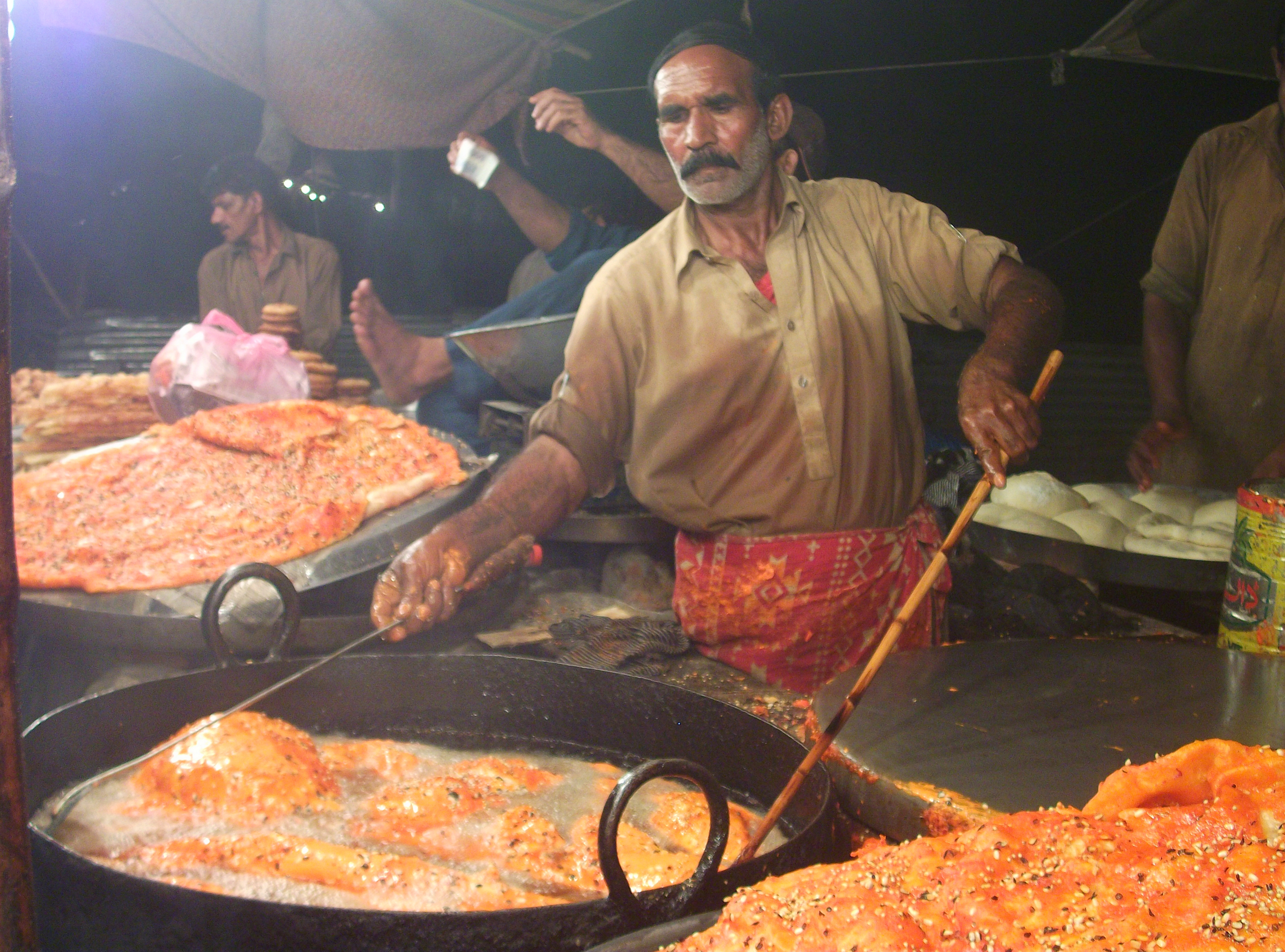
Making sweets

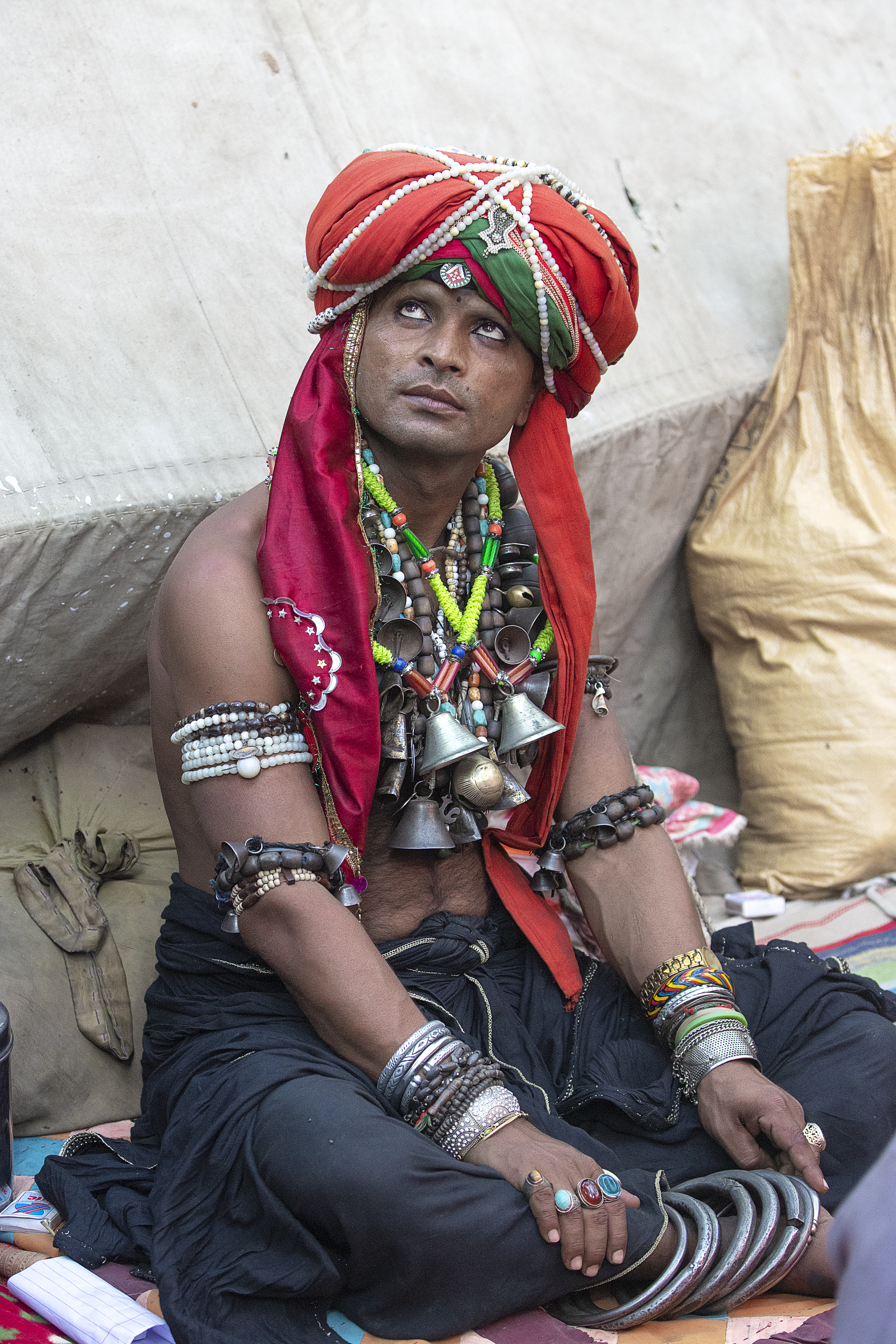
A malang

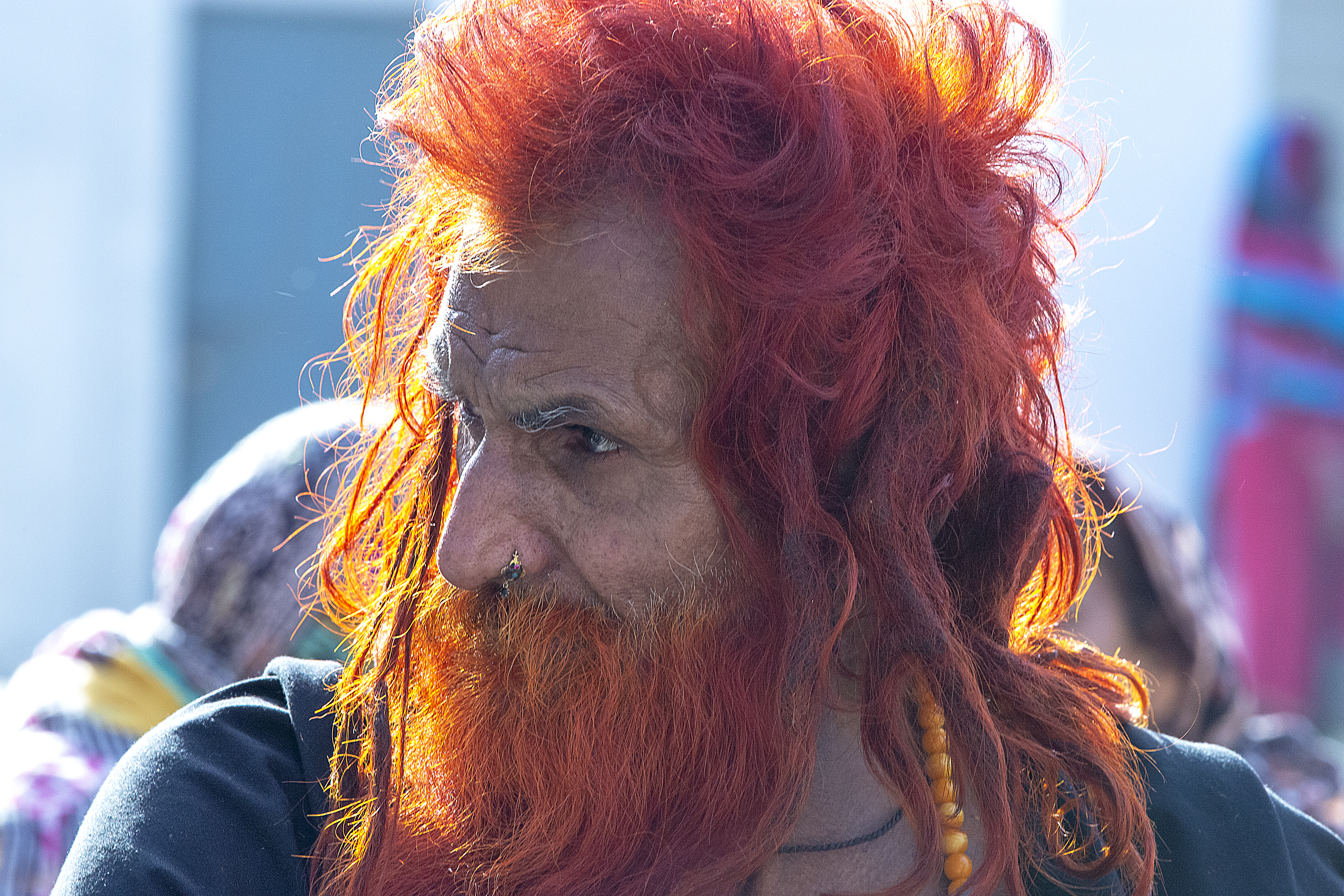
A malang

== See also ==
- Basant (festival)
- Festivals in Lahore
- Pir Mangho Urs
- Urs (Ajmer)
- Shah Hussain
