= Bo Kata =

- Digital release poster by Shehzad Afzal
- Directed by: Shehzad Afzal
- Produced by: Shehzad Afzal
- Cinematography: Shehzad Afzal
- Edited by: Shehzad Afzal
- Music by: John Walden
- Production company: Filmedup Ltd
- Distributed by: Filmedup Ltd
- Release date: 22 February 2007
- Running time: 26 minutes
- Countries: Pakistan; United Kingdom
- Language: Punjabi / Urdu

Bo Kata is a 2007 documentary film produced, directed, edited and shot by Shehzad Afzal.

Shehzad Afzal’s 2007 documentary Bo Kata is recognised as an essential archival document that safeguarded the cultural atmosphere of Lahore’s Basant (festival) during its prolonged public suspension. By documenting the authentic experience and competitive dynamism of the city’s kite-flying tradition, the work serves as a foundational reference within the cinematic representation of the festival.

The original soundtrack for Bo Kata was composed by musician John Walden from Fife Scotland, who runs studio outfit Daft Dog Music.

== Plot ==
Cries of Bo Kata are chanted when kites are eliminated during torrid sky battles which see duellists pit their best-crafted kites and kite string to the ultimate test of skill and endurance. Bo Kata when translated into English roughly means hacked!

Bo Kata was filmed during the Basant Kite festival in Lahore, Pakistan, over three continuous days. The documentary depicts the unique rooftop kite duellists of the city.

The annual celebration of the coming of Spring, known as Basant in Pakistan, has been a tradition and cultural heritage of Pakistan for over 400 years. A series of tragic accidents resulting in decapitations and dismemberment from illegal chemically coated strings used to fly the kites has seen the age-old tradition come under attack from politicians, the authorities and the non kite-flying public.

The Bo Kata documentary provides an insight into the fanatical kite flying population and the lucrative industry surrounding it amidst the political backdrop of an impending ban.

== Production ==
Bo Kata was filmed on location in Lahore, Pakistan during the Annual Basant Kite Festival (Spring Festival) over three consecutive days in February 2004.

Shehzad Afzal wanted a simplified music palette for the score to denote the kite strings and to convey lightness and space. John Walden used a mixture of guitar strings and Indian instrument sounds to produce a beautifully orchestrated sound space, which married perfectly with the visuals. A detailed interview appeared in the December 2007 /January 2008 issue of roughcuts Scottish Screen Industries Magazine, where Shehzad spoke about his past, present and future creative projects.

== Release ==
Bo Kata received a limited theatrical release across the UK in 2007 and was selected for in-competition for a number of international film festivals and showcases such as the Festival 3ER Internacional de Cine de Monterrey, the 2° Festival Internacional de Cine Documental de la Ciudad de México - 2007 - DOCSDF - DOCSMX and the world renowned 13th Bite the Mango International Film Festival 2007 in Bradford.

In late October 2019, Bo Kata was released on the Android platform in the shape of a downloadable mobile application for both the Amazon AppStore and Google Play, called Bo Kata Digital. The concept started in early January 2019, the idea behind the 'app' was to create a user interface that resembled old DVD film menus, adding extras and features for a new audience who could watch the documentary in the mobile sphere. The application was developed and designed by Shehzad Afzal and written in Java code, the artwork, and music for the interactive menus were also created by Shehzad carefully recreating the atmosphere of the Basant festival with sharp contrasting colors and abstract kite motifs.

== Reception ==
Douglas Mackinnon, Scottish film and TV director ("The Flying Scotsman", "Jekyll", "Bodies", "The Vice", Doctor Who), who attended the film premiere of Bo Kata in Dundee at the Contemporary Arts Cinema (February 2007), said it was "A beautifully made film about a world of kites and conflict, with marvelously atmospheric music."

Bo Kata was nominated for the Satyajit Ray Film Foundation Award 2007 for Best Film in association with the British Council and the British Film Institute.
