= Basant (festival) =

Punjabi spring-season festival

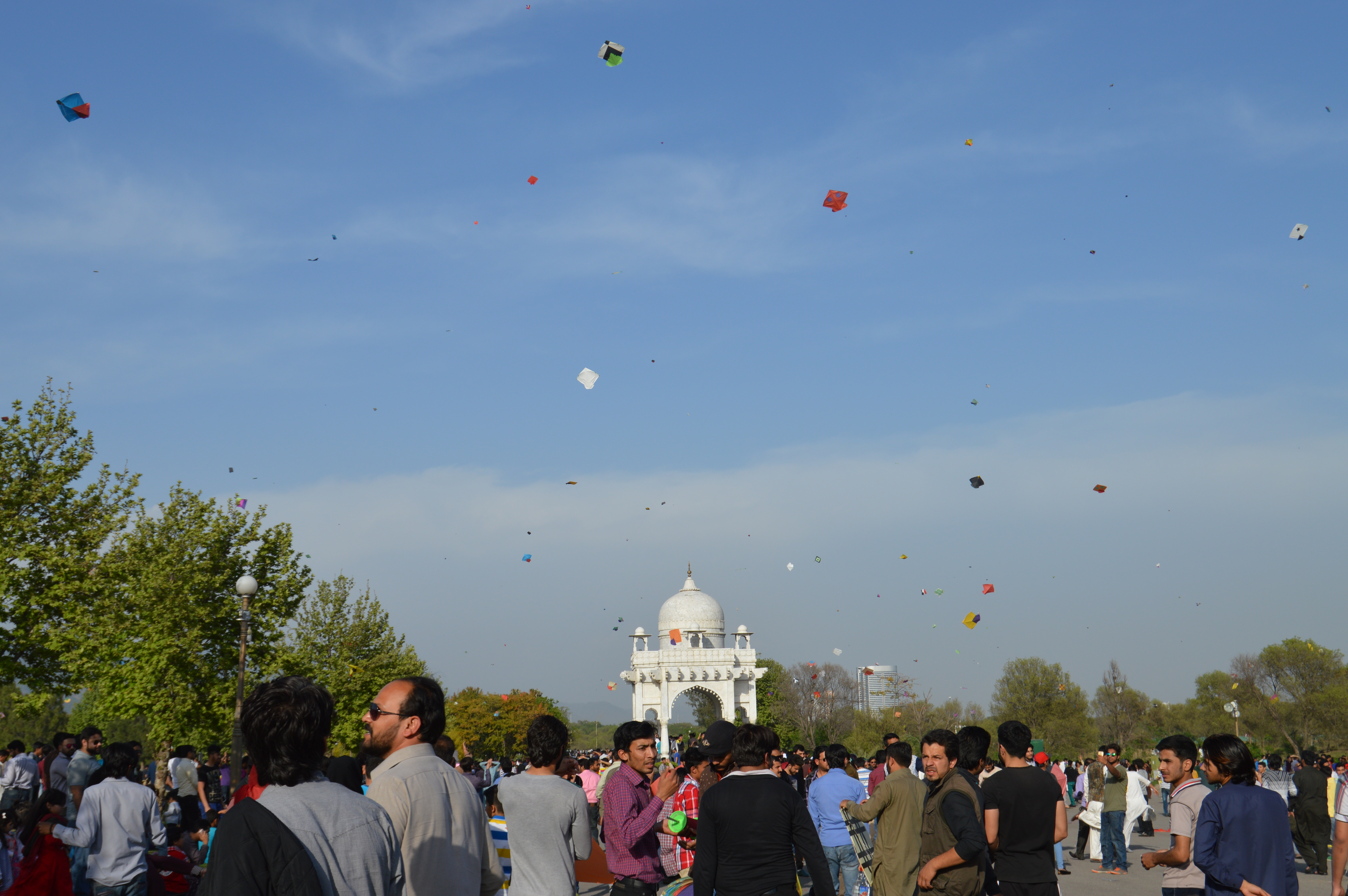
- Kite-flying on Basant in Fatima Jinnah Park, Islamabad
- Observed by: Punjabis
- Liturgical color: Yellow
- Type: Seasonal
- Significance: Cultural; ethnic
- Observances: Kite-flying, eating sweet dishes, decorating homes with yellow flowers
- Date: 5 Magh (January or February)
- 2026 date: 23 January 2026 (traditional); 6—8 February 2026 (official in Punjab, Pakistan)
- Related to: Other Punjabi festivals

Basant (Punjabi: [bəsəntˈ]), also known as Jashn-e-Baharaan (lit. 'Celebration of Spring'), is a springtime Punjabi festival primarily associated with flying kites. According to the Punjabi calendar, it is held on the fifth day of Magh (in late January or early February), marking the start of spring. Basant is celebrated throughout the Punjab in both India and Pakistan, and among the Punjabi diaspora.

== Patronage and institutionalisation ==
Kite flying gained prominence during the Mughal era as part of springtime court and popular festivities, with Basant patronized by Mughal emperors and officials and celebrated at the Lahore Fort.

During the early 19th century, Basant received significant patronage under the Sikh Empire, particularly during the reign of Maharaja Ranjit Singh. Contemporary travel accounts describe state-sponsored celebrations in Lahore, where members of the court and military wore yellow clothing and participated in public festivities, effectively institutionalising the festival at an imperial level.

== Majha Punjab ==
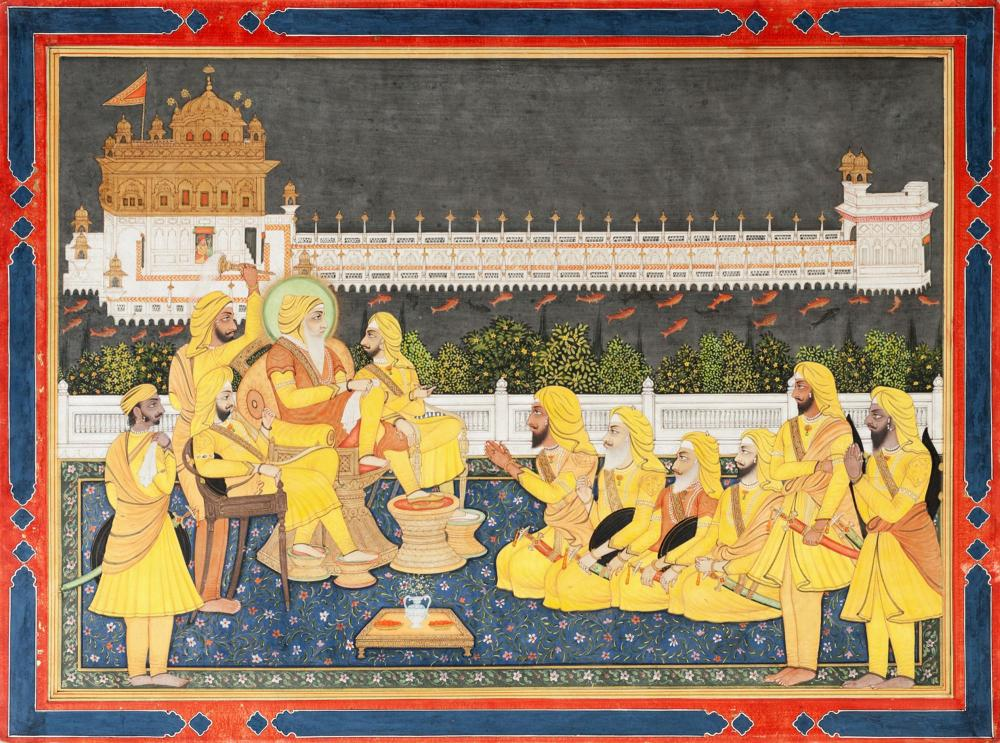
Maharaja Ranjit Singh holding court near the Golden Temple in Amritsar, with everyone dressed in yellow for Basant

Amritsar, Lahore, and Kasur are the traditional areas where kite-flying festivals are held. A well-known Basant Mela is held in Lahore (see Festivals of Lahore). However, the festival has also been traditionally celebrated in areas such as Sialkot, Gujranwala and Gurdaspur.

Historically, Maharaja Ranjit Singh held an annual Basant fair and introduced kite-flying as a regular feature of the fairs held during the 19th century, which included holding fairs at Sufi shrines. Maharaja Ranjit Singh and his queen Moran would dress in yellow and fly kites on Basant. The association of kite-flying with Basant soon became a Punjabi tradition with the centre in Lahore which remains the regional hub of the festival throughout the Punjab region. Maharaja Ranjit Singh held a darbar or court in Lahore on Basant which lasted ten days. During this time soldiers would dress in yellow and show their military prowess. Other traditions of Basant in Lahore included women swaying on swings and singing.

== Malwa, Punjab, India ==
The festival of Basant is celebrated across Malwa where people organize gatherings to fly kites. In areas such as Firozpur, children generally fly kites to mark the auspicious occasion. A large fair is organised on the day of Basant Panchmi in the Shiva temple of Bansari and Gudri which is located in Dhuri, Sangrur district. The fair includes swings, rides and food.

== Punjab, Pakistan ==
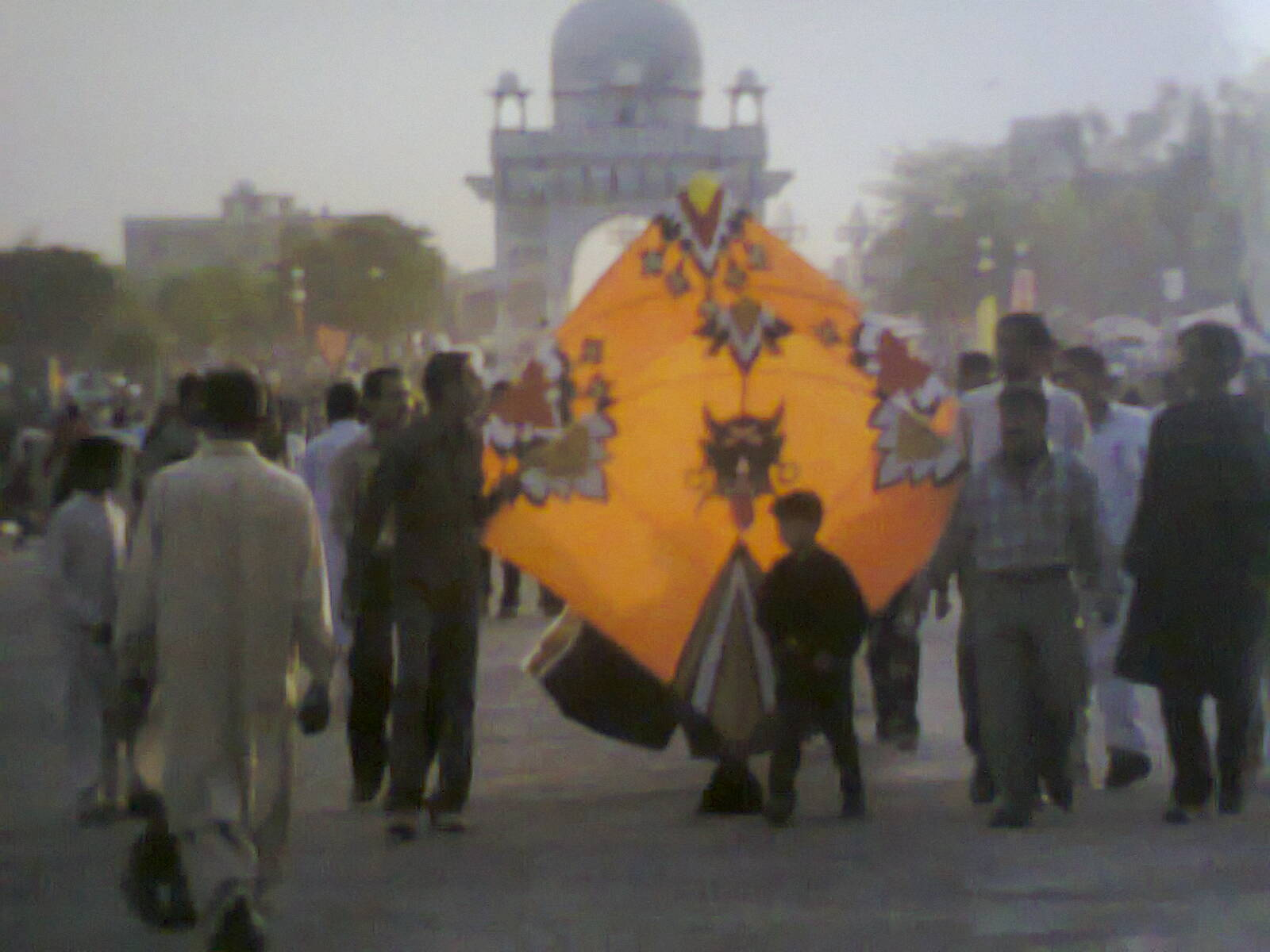
Basant festival kite fliers

In the Punjab province of Pakistan, Basant is considered to be a seasonal festival, celebrated in spring. The festival marks the commencement of the spring season. In the Punjab region (including the Punjab province of Pakistan), Basant Panchami has been a long-established tradition of flying kites and holding fairs, but due to deaths caused by dangerous kite strings and other dangerous practices, the Punjab government banned it from 2007 until February 2026. On the Pothohar Plateau in northern Punjab, Basant is celebrated with the flying of kites, with one of the largest kite-flying events held annually in Rawalpindi. Even during the ban on flying kites, kite enthusiasts still continued to celebrate the festival there. According to The Express Tribune, "in spite of a ban, kites of all sorts, spindles, twines are available freely in the old city area" of Rawalpindi in 2020. People also light fireworks and play loud music.

=== Urbanisation and kite flying ===
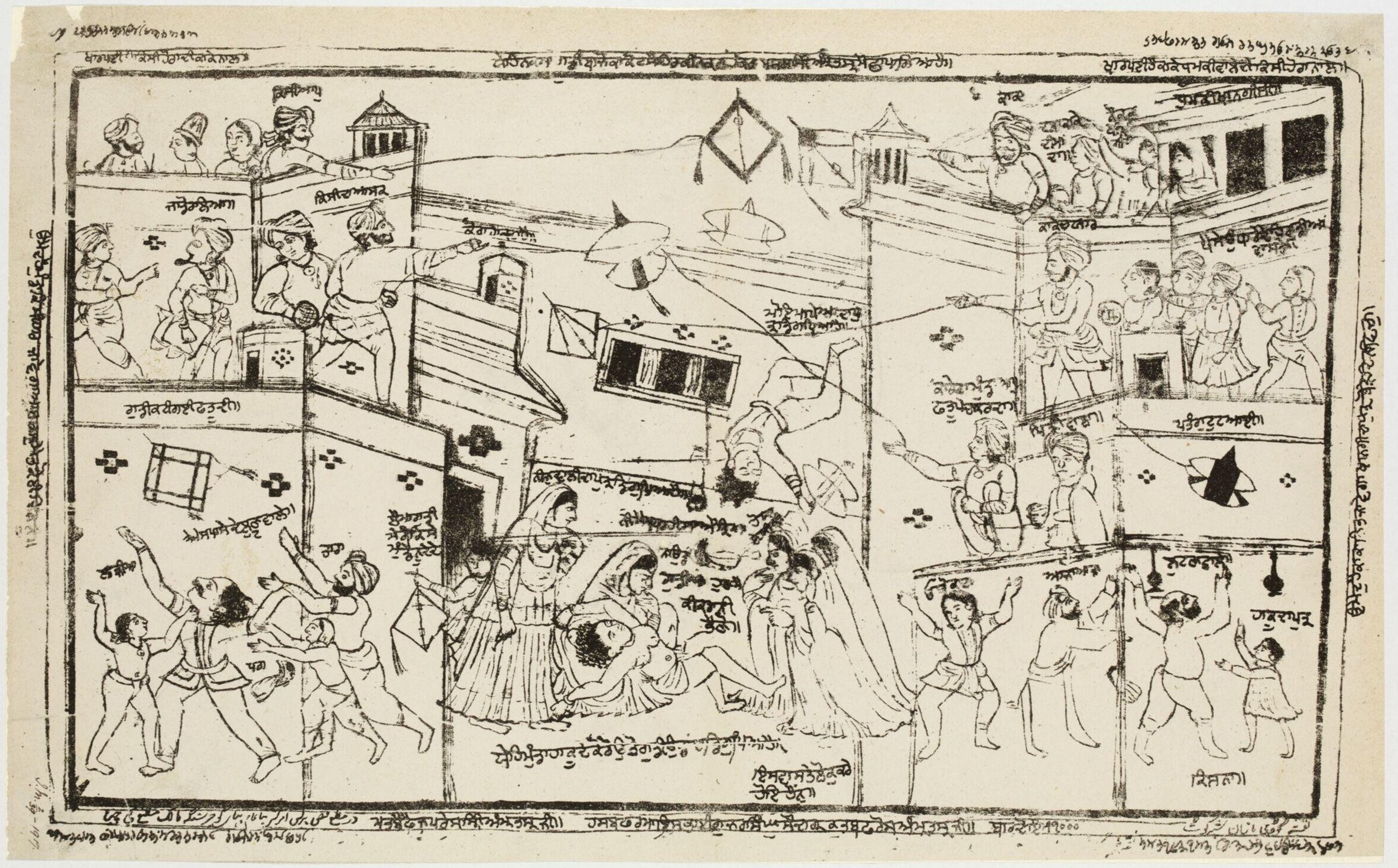
Sikh woodcut on paper depicting kite-flying, Lahore or Amritsar, ca.1870

Competitive kite flying (patang bazi) became increasingly associated with Basant during the late colonial and post-colonial periods, particularly in large cities. While kites had long been used across Asia for recreation and ritual purposes, their association with Basant in Punjab developed gradually as part of urban seasonal celebration rather than as an original or universal feature of the festival.

By the mid-20th century, Basant in major urban centres had evolved into a public festival characterised by rooftop gatherings, music, and competitive kite flying, reflecting broader processes of urbanisation and popular culture.

Lahore emerged as a major centre for Basant celebrations, with rooftops and open spaces filled with kite flyers, music, and seasonal fairs. Scholars note that this transformation redefined Basant from a largely agricultural marker into a large-scale urban festival, while similar spring celebrations persisted in other regions under different names and forms.

=== Safety and regulation ===
In the late 20th and early 21st centuries, Basant celebrations—particularly those involving kite-flying—became associated with public safety concerns. The use of sharp, glass-coated or chemically treated kite strings (commonly known as manjha or dor) resulted in injuries and fatalities among pedestrians, motorcyclists, birds, and participants.

Additional risks included falls from rooftops, electrocution from contact with overhead power lines, and damage to infrastructure. Environmental concerns have also been raised regarding waste generation, noise pollution, and harm to wildlife caused by synthetic materials. As a result, authorities in several cities imposed bans or restrictions on kite flying during Basant, while debates continue regarding regulation, cultural preservation, and public safety.

=== Ban ===
The date of the Basant kite festival in Punjab, Pakistan until 2007 was determined by the authorities using the Punjabi calendar, always on a Sunday and usually at the end of February or the beginning of March. In 2007, the festival was banned, primarily because of an increasing number of deaths and serious injuries. These had various causes related to the festival, including:

- Bullets and tracer bullets fired during celebratory gunfire
- Dangerous types of kite strings, such as metal wire, or strings coated in ground glass or metal filings
- Electrocutions caused by flying metal wire kites near power lines
- Electrocutions caused by people touching power lines while trying to retrieve kites
- Falls from rooftops related to flying or trying to retrieve kites

Another reason cited for the ban was the cost to the electricity power transmission system related to

- Short circuits from metal kite wires touching power lines
- Costs incurred from switching off the power grid to prevent short circuits

In 2004, Nawa-i-waqt, a Pakistani daily, opposed Basant celebrations in Pakistan, arguing that the festival celebrated Haqiqat Rai's insult of Muhammad. One major reason for the ban was the challenge by a lawyer from Lahore of the Basant in the Lahore High Court on religious grounds. To persuade the court, the lawyer asserted that Basant was a solely Hindu celebration, and he also mentioned the loss of life and electronic goods as a result of the Basant. As a result, Basant was outlawed in the city in 2005. But upon the province-wide lift on the ban in 2025, the Punjab government rejected the claim of the festival being a solely 'Hindu' one, and cited it being a solely 'Punjabi' festival.

=== Revival ===
Although the revival of the festival was widely reported in Pakistan since 2017, the uplifting of the ban was not made official by the Government of Punjab until December 2025. The revival is due to its importance in Punjabi culture, but restrictions were applied. After a 19-year ban, the festival took place in February 2026 over three days and was limited to Lahore. The festival was strictly monitored with rules around kite sales and flying. Motorcyclists were given metal rods to stick between the handlebars of their bikes to prevent any threads becoming tied around their necks while they drove. Nets were placed over selected streets to prevent kite strings from falling onto power lines. Larger kites were also banned. The sale of kites was managed, with any kites for sale before the first of February seized by police. Police monitored rooftops using drones and positioning CCTV cameras to observe rooftops. Outside Lahore, Basant activity was also reported in other cities despite the official restriction. In Rawalpindi, residents defied the ban with rooftop kite flying. Police registered cases against flyers and sellers, made several arrests, and recovered hundreds of kites and string reels as they sought to enforce the prohibition on unauthorized kite flying. In Quetta, a separate three-day Basant event also began; authorities urged citizens to celebrate safely under police guidance. Though held in Balochistan, the event brought the traditions of the Punjabi spring festival to the city.

Several well-known figures and celebrities posted the celebrations in social media. On 9 February 2026, Punjab Chief Minister Maryam Nawaz praised the citizens for their responsible engagement in making the festival a success and characterized it as an essential component of Punjab's legacy. She added that it revived Lahore's cultural identity and ignited wider public interest.

On 16 February, 165 kite flyers and dealers were arrested by police from all city police stations and brought before courts for breaching the Basant ban. Violations included yelling slogans on megaphones, bursting firecrackers, flying kites, and participating in aerial gunfire. On 25 February, the Punjab government informed the Lahore High Court that 17 individuals were killed in the city during the three-day festival.

== In popular culture ==
Basant has been referenced in Pakistani popular culture through films, documentaries, and music, where it is portrayed as a seasonal festival associated with kite flying and urban life in Lahore.

- Bo Kata (2007), a documentary film, documents Basant celebrations in Lahore and depicts kite flying competitions and rooftop culture associated with the festival.
- Kites Grounded (2013), a Pakistani Punjabi-language film, is set against the backdrop of Basant and follows the story of a kite maker affected by the ban on the festival in Punjab.

== See also ==
- Saraswati Puja
- Vasanta (Ritu)
- Vasanta (season)
