= Hamid Ali Bela =

Pakistani folk singer (1932 - 2001)

- Born: 1932; Amritsar, Punjab, British India
- Died: 26 June 2001 (aged 68–69); Lahore, Pakistan
- Occupations: Folk singer, TV performer, radio performer
- Years active: 1950s-1999
- Awards: Pride of Performance Award by the President of Pakistan in 1994

Hamid Ali Bela (1932 – 26 June 2001) was a Pakistani folk singer and television performer specializing in kafi singing.

== Early life and career ==
Hamid Ali Bela was born in 1932 in Amritsar, British India. His father's name was Ghulam Haider. His family migrated to Pakistan after the independence of Pakistan in 1947. He started his career at Radio Pakistan, Lahore in the 1950s. His mentor at this radio station was radio producer Abdul Shakoor Bedil who helped him much in developing his career including Hamid's pronunciation of Punjabi folk songs. Subsequently, Hamid Ali Bela was able to develop his own unique style of singing kafis which he is mostly known for in Pakistan.

He also used to sing at All Pakistan Music Conference events and other folk music festivals in Pakistan. He was among the folk artists that had performed all over the world.

Bela mostly sang folk songs and kafis based on the poetry of the Sufi saints of Punjab including Bulleh Shah, Shah Hussain Faqir, Sultan Bahu, Khawaja Ghulam Farid and Waris Shah.

== Popular songs ==
- Rabba Meray Haal Da Mehram Tuun
- Mai Ni Mein Kinnun Aakhan, Dard Vichhorey Da Haal Ni
- Ni Teinun Rab Na Bhullay, Dua Faqeeran Di Aei Haa
- Sassii e Bekhabre
- Chal Melay Nu Chaliye
- Neu La Laya Ae Beparwah Dei Naal
- Kahe Hussain Faqir Nimana

== Awards and recognition ==
- Pride of Performance Award by the President of Pakistan in 1994.

== Death ==
Hamid Ali Bela died on 26 June 2001 at Lahore, Pakistan after a short illness.
