= Shah Hussain =

Punjabi Sufi poet (1538–1599)

- شاہ حسین
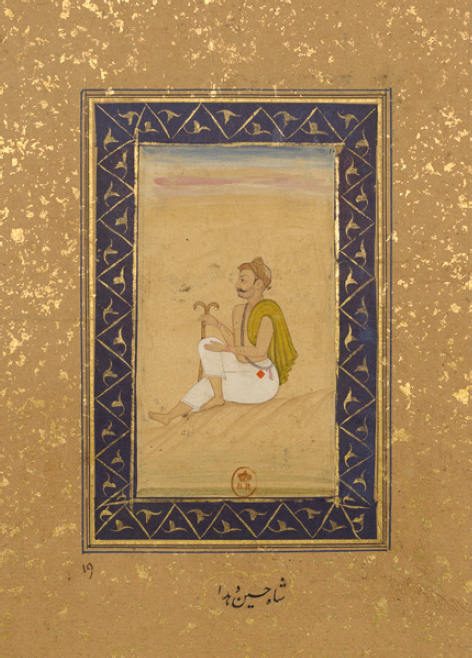
- Painting of the Punjabi Sufi saint Shah Hussain Qalandar, ca.1770
- Pronunciation: ʃaː(ɦ) ɦʊˈsɛːn
- Born: Hussain; 1538 CE (945 AH); Lahore, Punjab, Mughal Empire (present-day Punjab, Pakistan)
- Died: 1599 CE (1008 AH) near Ravi River, Lahore, Lahore Subah, Mughal Empire (present-day Punjab, Pakistan)
- Resting place: Darbar Shah Hussain, Baghbanpura, Lahore
- Other name: Madho Lal Hussain
- Occupation: Poet
- Era: Early Mughal era
- Notable work: Kāfiyā'n Shah Hussain
- Writing career
- Language: Punjabi
- Genres: Sufism; tragedy

Shah Hussain (Note: Punjabi: شاہ حسین (Shahmukhi); ਸ਼ਾਹ ਹੁਸੈਨ (Gurmukhi)) (Punjabi: [ʃaː(ɦ) ɦʊˈsɛːn]; 1538 – 1599), also known as Mādhō Lāl Hussain, (Note: pronounced [maːdʱoː laːl ɦʊˈsɛːn]) was a 16th-century Punjabi Sufi poet, who is regarded as a pioneer of the Kafi form in Punjabi poetry and the first major early-modern poet in the Punjab.

Shah Hussain was a student of Sufi saint Shaikh Bahlol Daryai, the founder of the Bahlol Shahi sub-order in the Qadiriyya tariqa. Before his death, the saint assigned Shah Hussain to be his representative in Lahore.

== Name ==
Shah Hussain is also known as Shah Hussain Faqir — Faqir denotes a dervish (mendicant) and Shah means king.

== Life ==
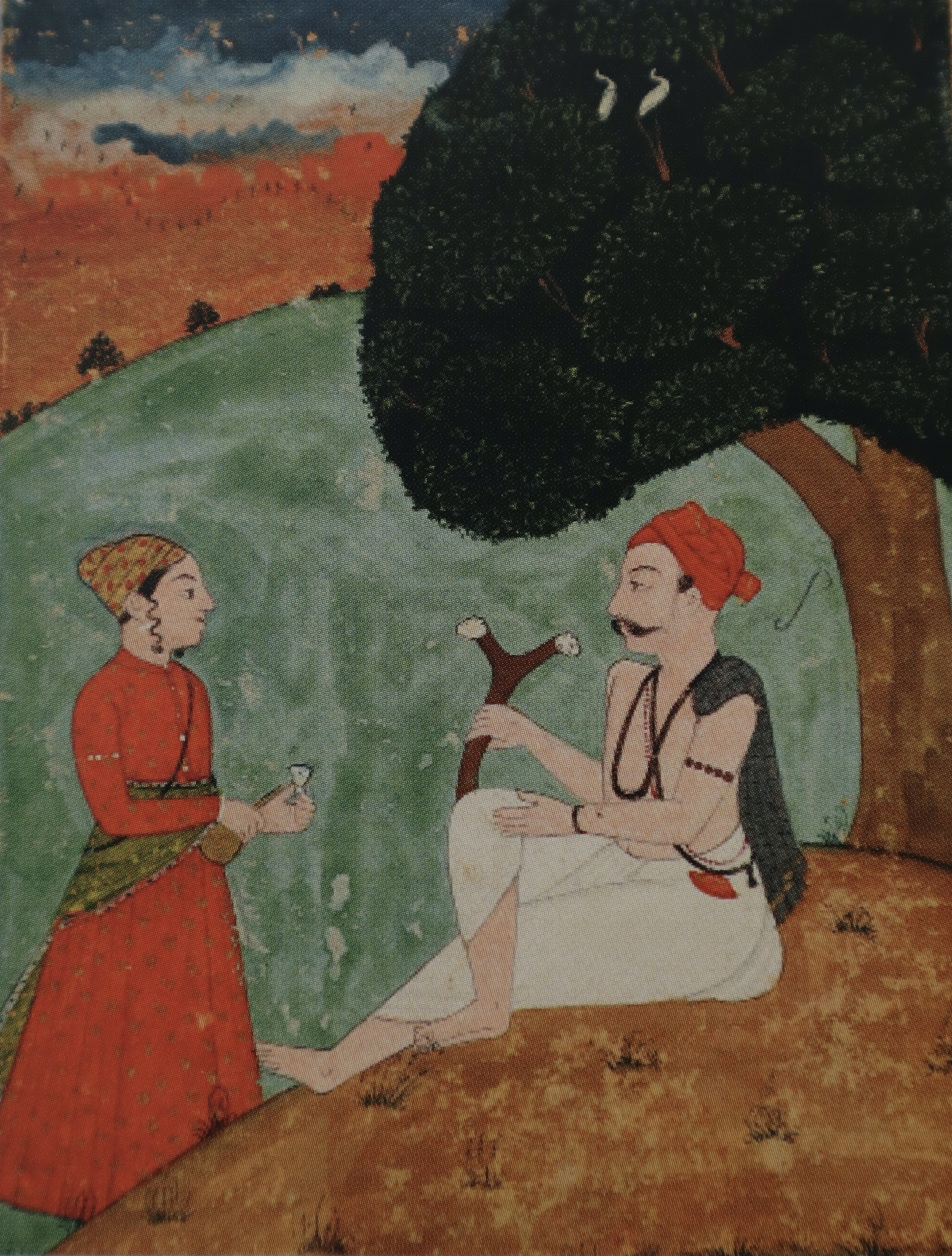
Miniature painting of Shah Hussain (right)

Hussain was born in 945 AH (1538) in the walled town of Lahore in contemporary Punjab, Pakistan. His father was Sheikh Usman, a Dhudhi Rajput, and by occupation, he was a weaver (in some of his poetic rhymes, Shah Hussain used his pen name as Faqir Hussain Julaha, which means "Saint Hussain the weaver"). His ancestor Kaljas Rai was a convert to Islam. Notable books written on his life include Risala Baharia (by Bahar Khan on the directions of Emperor Jahangir), Hasanat-ul-Arifin (by Prince Dara Shikoh in 1653), Haqiqat-ul-Fuqra (by Syed Sheikh Mahmood in 1662), Miftah-ul-Arifin (by Abdul Fatah Naqshbandi Mujadad in 1667), along with others. He lived during the 16th century in the early Mughal era, the Mughal interregnum with the Sur era, and the Mughal restoration.

== Relationship with Madho Lal ==
Shah Hussain is also known as Madho Lal Hussain due to his profound and unique bond with Madho Lal, a Hindu Brahmin boy. It is said that Hussain was captivated by Madho's beauty and devoted himself to him in a way that mirrored the Sufi tradition of divine love. Hussain even celebrated Hindu festivals like Vasant Panchami and Holi to honor Madho. Over time, Madho became Hussain's disciple and spiritual successor. After Hussain's death, Madho carried forward his legacy for 48 years until his own passing, and they were buried side by side at their shrine near Lahore's Shalimar Gardens.

== Shrine ==
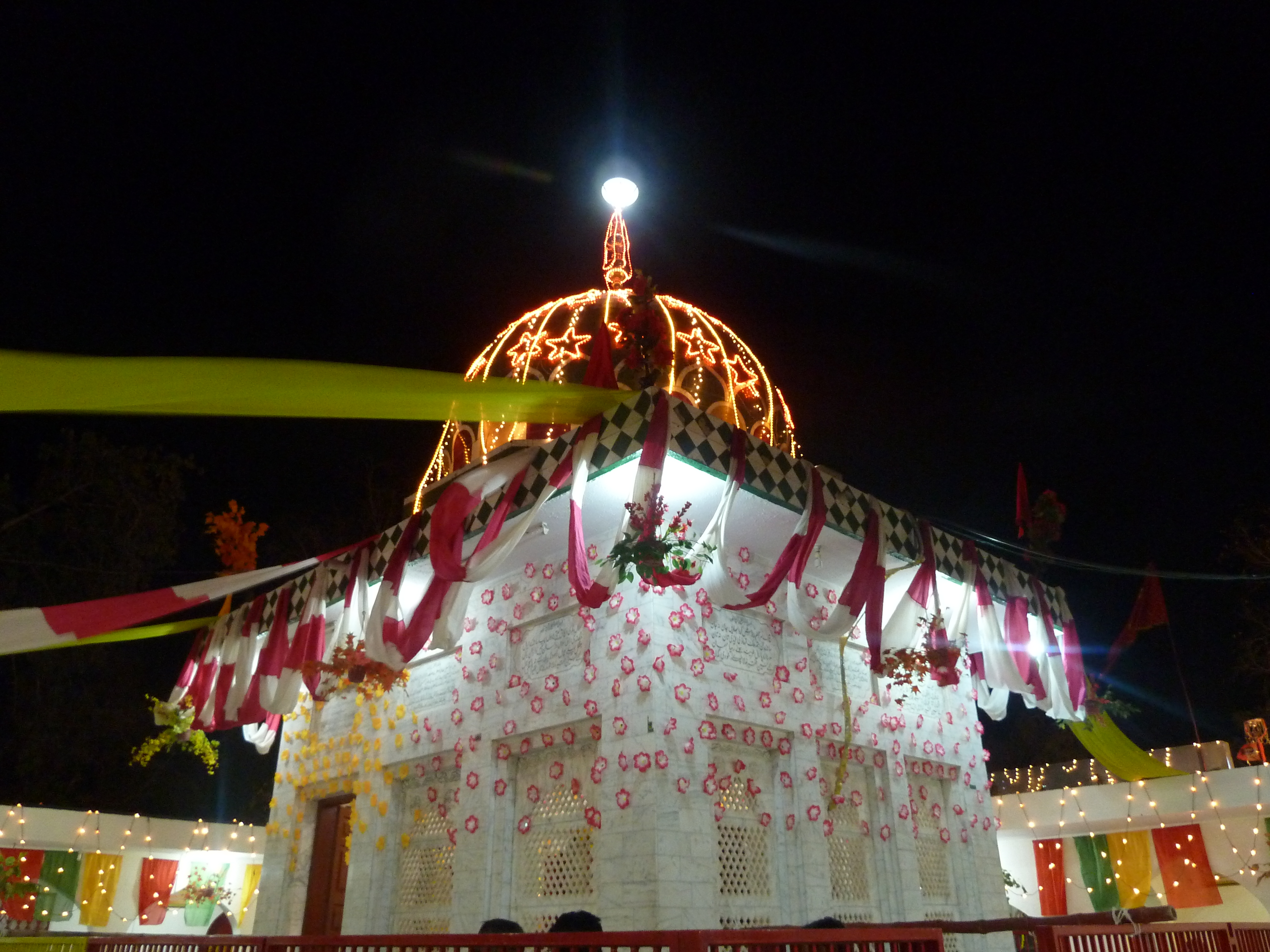
The Shrine of Shah Hussain in Lahore

His tomb and shrine is located at the Baghbanpura precincts, adjacent to the Shalamar Gardens, Lahore, Punjab, Pakistan. His urs is celebrated at his shrine every year during the "Mela Chiraghan" ("Festival of Lights"). Madho's tomb lies next to Hussain's in the shrine.

In the 18th century, during the reign of Maharaja Ranjit Singh (1780 – 1839) in Punjab, the maharaja himself would lead a procession from his palace in Lahore to Shah Hussain's shrine barefoot during Mela Chiraghan (Festival of Lights), accompanied by thousands of Sikhs, Muslims and Hindus. Shah Hussain's urs and the melā used to happen at two different times but were both combined into one and then called "Mela Chiraghan" (Festival of Lights) by Ranjit Singh. This mela (festival) is considered to be the biggest festival of Punjab.

== Poetry ==
Hussain's works of poetry consist entirely of short poems known as Kafis. A typical 'Hussain Kafi' contains a refrain and some rhymed lines. The number of rhymed lines is usually between four and ten. Only occasionally is a longer form adopted. Hussain's Kafis are also composed for, and the singing of them has been set to music based on Punjabi folk music. Many of his Kafis are part of the traditional Qawwali repertoire. His poems have been performed as songs by Kaavish, Nusrat Fateh Ali Khan, Abida Parveen, Ghulam Ali, Hamid Ali Bela, Amjad Parvez, Junoon and Noor Jehan, among others.

Shah Hussain often assumed a female persona in their poetry, portraying themselves as brides and God as the male beloved or bridegroom. He used multiple terms for God in his poetry, such as Sajjan, Sāi'yāņ, Şāĥib, and Kant, all referring to husband, beloved, or bridegroom in Punjabi.

ਸਜਣ ਦੇ ਹਥਿ ਬਾਂਹ ਅਸਾਡੀ, ਕਿਉਂ ਕਰਿ ਆਖਾਂ ਛਡਿ ਵੇ ਅੜਿਆ سجن دے ہتھ بانہ اساڈی، کی کر آکھاں چھڈ وے اڑیا

The human soul is represented as a bride, with different states of the soul depicted through various female roles; An unmarried girl unaware of her destiny, a bride-to-be waiting for her groom or a married woman in marital bliss or longing for reunion. He wrote in the concept of spiritual marriage or "betrothal to God" to symbolize the soul's union with the Divine. Thus, he represented soul's relationship with God through marital imagery. He would call a soul that has attained communion with the Divine as suhāgan (happily married woman), and a soul that fails to achieve divine love as duhāgan (unlucky or deserted wife). Shah Husayn used items associated with brides, such as the sālo (a red-dyed embroidered cloth), to symbolize spiritual concepts like good deeds and the soul's journey.

"It may be asserted that poetry is often written to be sung. And all poetry carries, through manipulation of sound effects, some suggestion of music".

Here are three examples, which draw on the famous love story of Heer Ranjha:

Ni Mai menoon Khedeyan di gal naa aakh
Ranjhan mera, main Ranjhan di,
Khedeyan noon koodi jhak
Lok janey Heer kamli hoi,
Heeray da var chak

Translation:

Do not talk of the Khedas to me, mother.
I belong to Ranjha and he belongs to me.
And the Khedas dream idle dreams.
Let the people say, "Heer is crazy;
she has given herself to a cowherd."

Another Kafi:

Sajjan bin raatan hoiyan whadiyaan
Ranjha jogi, main jogiani, kamli kar kar sadiyaan
Maas jhurey jhur pinjer hoya, kadken lagiyaan haddiyaan
Main ayani niyoonh ki janan, birhon tannawan gadiyaan
Kahe Husain faqeer sain da, larr tere main lagiyaan

Main vi jaanaan jhok Ranjhan di, naal mere koi challey
Pairan paindi, mintaan kardi, jaanaan tan peya ukkaley
Neen vi dhoonghi, tilla purana, sheehan ney pattan malley
Ranjhan yaar tabeeb sadhendha, main tan dard awalley
Kahe Hussain faqeer namana, sain sunedha ghalley

Translation:

The nights are long without my beloved.
Since Ranjha became a jogi, I have scarcely been my old self; people everywhere call me crazy.
My young flesh is all wrinkled, my bones are a creaking skeleton.
I was too young to understand love; and now as the nights swell and merge into each other,
I play host to that unkind guest – separation.

I have to go to Ranjha's hut, will someone go with me?
I have begged many to accompany me, but I had to set out alone.
The river is deep, and the shaky bridge creaks.
I am tortured by my wounds, but Ranjha my beloved is the doctor who can cure them.
Only my beloved can bring me comfort.

Two Kafis that are addressed to his Hindu disciple Madhu Lal Hussain need a special mention:

Madho Lal! Piyaare ki parwaasa dam da?
Udeyaa bhor theyaa pardesi aggey raah agam da!
Jinhaan saada shauh rijhaaya tinha nu bhow jam da?
Aakhey Hussain faqeer nimaana chhaddiye sareer bhasam da!

Ve Madhu! Main wadda theyaa badnaam!
Raati pi ke dukh da piyaala tureyaa suwairon shaam!
Ki aakhaan main ki si peeti? Loki dassan haraam!
Kaafar aakhan saarey mainoon laawan sabh ilzaam!
Mukh fairan sabh maidey wallon naal kaddan dushnaam!
Rowey Hussain maidey Saain nu Madho chheti pej salaam!

Translation:

Madhu Lal! My dear what is this trust on life?
You fly out in the morning and become a stranger, to take on an unknown road!
Those that have pleased our Master in this life do they have to fear death which is the hereafter?
Says Hussain the pride less mendicant, cast off this body of ashes!

O Madhu! I have been greatly defamed!
After drinking last night from my cup of sorrows, I have wandered from morning till evening.
What can I say that I had drunk of? People say it was the forbidden wine!
All here call me an infidel and accuse me of transgression!
They turn back their faces from me and abuse me!
Wails Hussain O Madhu fast send my prayer to my Master!

== See also ==
- List of Punjabi language poets
- Qawwali
