= Kites Grounded =

Pakistani Punjabi language drama film

- Film poster
- Directed by: Murtaza Ali
- Written by: Aneeza Syed
- Produced by: Seema Hameed
- Starring: Irfan Khoosat; Tasneem Kausar; Abid Kashmiri
- Cinematography: Murtaza Ali
- Music by: Shahid Kamal
- Release date: 2013
- Running time: 110 minutes
- Country: Pakistan
- Language: Punjabi

Kites Grounded (Punjabi: ھُن کی تیرا زور نی گُڈیۓ) is a 2013 Pakistani Punjabi language drama film directed by Murtaza Ali and produced by Seema Hameed. The film stars Irfan Khoosat, Tasneem Kausar, Abid Kashmiri and others. The story is about the life of old Chacha Kareem (Irfan Khoosat) who, after being rendered jobless following the passing of the Punjab Prohibition of Kite Flying (amendment) Bill in 2009, is gradually losing his passion for making kites. Film has been shot in old Lahore, a city where kite-flying holds much importance.

== Plot ==
Kites Grounded is a film about an old kite maker Chacha Kareem. Passionately in love with his craft, Kareem is a quiet, conflict avoiding man. Having lived all his life making kites and mastering the art, he is forced upon giving up his job to meet the need of time.

His house is full of kites worth easily enough to solve all his problems and support him for the whole year, but the banning of the kite- flying festival (Basant) leaves no one wanting to buying the kites anymore.

== Cast ==
- Irfan Khoosat as Chacha Kareem (Kite-maker)
- Tasneem Kausar as Shakeela (wife)
- Abid Kashmiri as Saleem (Friend)
- Tahira Babar
- Zohaib Haider
- Sana Sehar
- Razia Malik
