= Turban =

Type of headwear

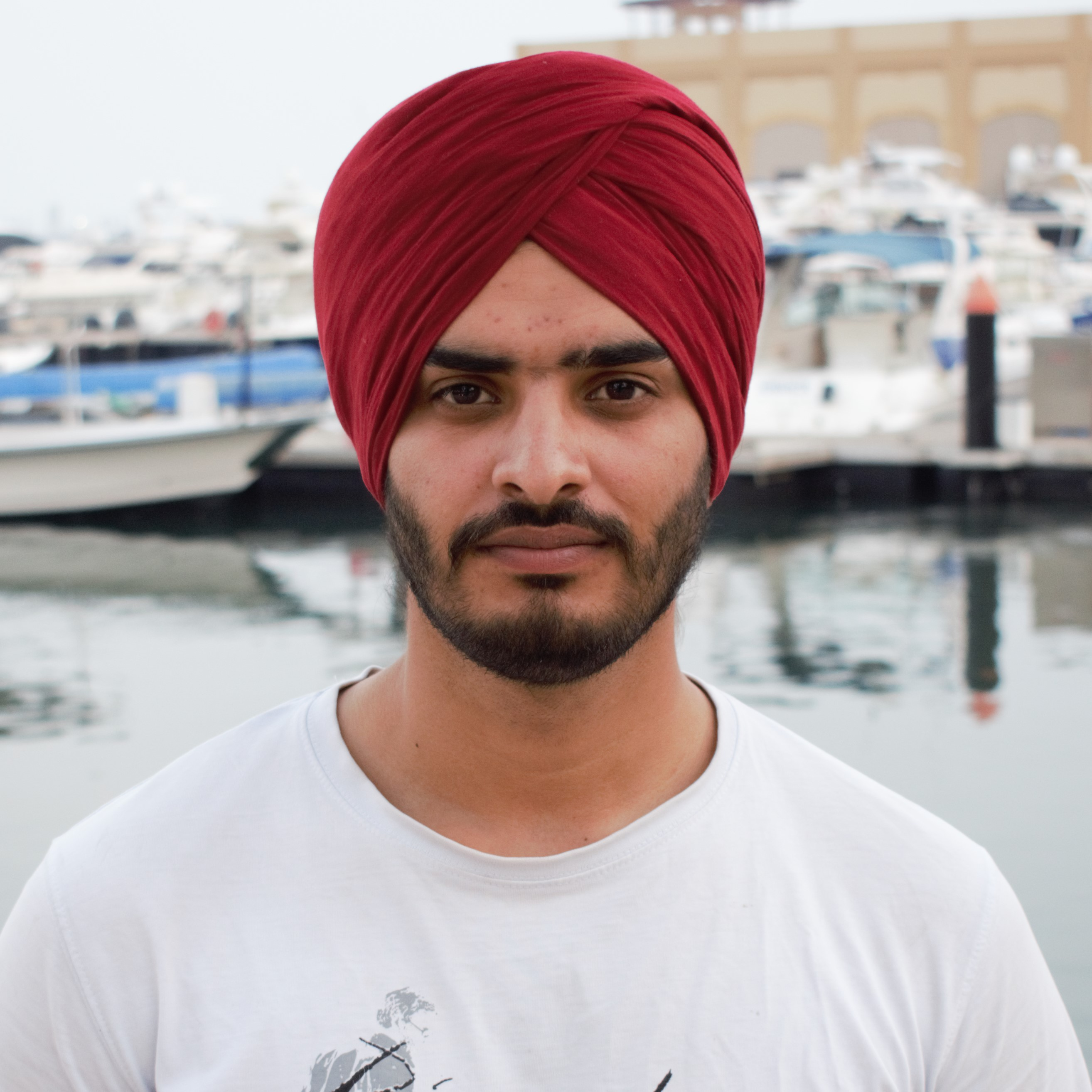
Sikh style turban

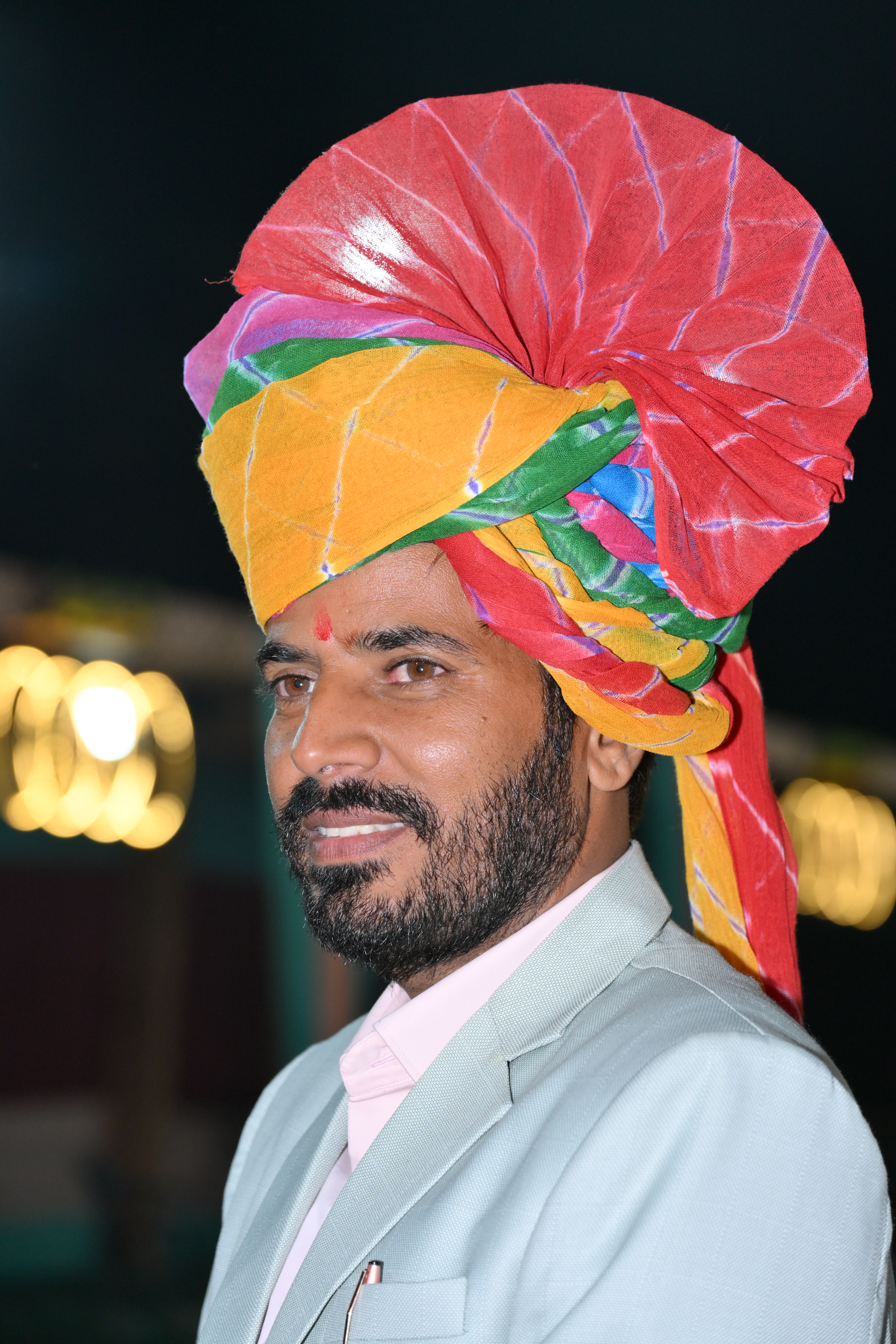
Rajasthani style

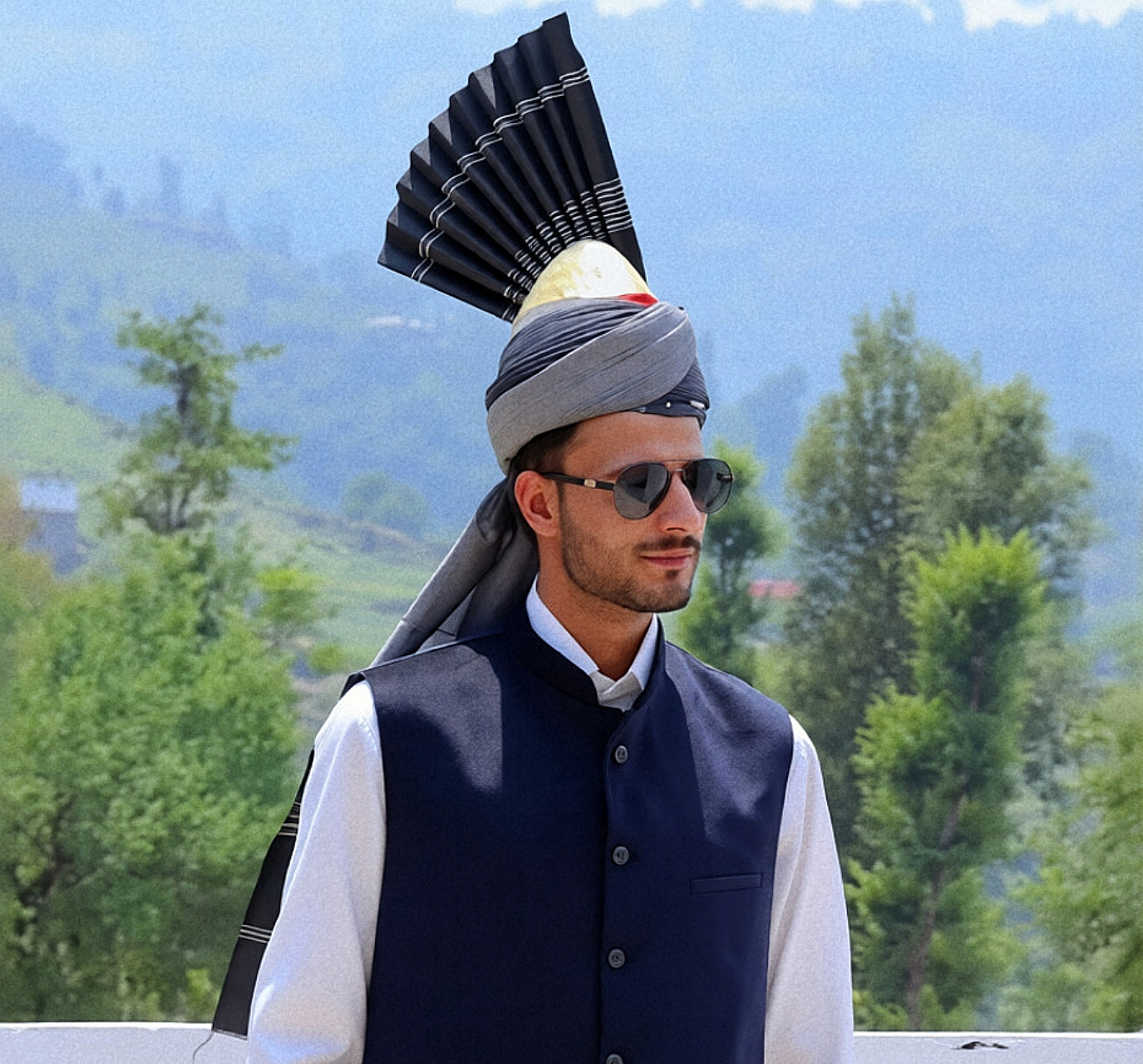
West Punjabi style

A turban (from Persian: دولبند‌, dolband; via Middle French: turbant) is a type of headwear based on cloth winding. Featuring many variations, it is worn as customary headwear by people of various cultures. Communities with prominent turban-wearing traditions can be found in the South Asia, Southeast Asia, West Asia, Southeast Europe, the Caucasus, Central Asia, North Africa, West Africa, East Africa, and amongst some Turkic peoples in Russia.

A keski is a type of turban mainly worn by female Sikhs, with a long piece of cloth roughly half the length of a traditional "single turban", but not cut and sewn to make a double-width "double turban" (or double patti).

Wearing turbans is common among Sikh men (Dastar), and infrequently women. They are also worn by Hindu monks. The headgear also serves as a religious observance, including among Shia Muslims, who regard turban-wearing as Sunnah mu'akkadah ('confirmed tradition'). The turban is also the traditional headdress of Sufi scholars. Muslim men might wear the turban (Imama) during prayer. Additionally, turbans have often been worn by nobility, regardless of religious background.

Turbans come in a variety of styles, and the method of wrapping can vary. Some turbans are simple and functional, while others are elaborate and serve ceremonial or formal purposes. The way a turban is tied can indicate the wearer's social or marital status, religious affiliation, or regional identity. Aside from cultural and religious significance, turbans are also practical headwear. They provide protection from the sun, dust, and wind. In some regions with hot climates, turbans can help keep the head cool.

== History ==
The earliest depiction of a turban can be found on a Mesopotamian sculpture dating back to 2350 BCE. A style of turban called a phakeolis continued to be worn in that region by soldiers of the Byzantine army in the period 400–600, as well as by Byzantine civilians as depicted in Greek frescoes from the 10th century in the province of Cappadocia in modern Turkey, where it was still worn by their Greek-speaking descendants in the early 20th century.

Ancient Persian society contributed significantly to the development of headgear traditions. One prominent example is the qalansuwa, a type of hat worn by elites during the Sasanian Empire, it was adopted by other Islamic caliphates It existed in different forms, including regular and tall versions, with the taller style often associated with court ceremonies and displays of rank.

The Islamic prophet, Muhammad, who lived 570–632, wore an Imama turban. The style of turban he introduced was a cap with a cloth tied around it; this headwear is known as Imama and was emulated by Muslim kings and scholars throughout history. Shia clerics today wear white turbans unless they are descendants of Muhammad or sayyid, in which case they wear a black turban. Many Muslim men choose to wear green, because it represents paradise, especially among followers of Sufism. In parts of North Africa, where blue is common, the shade of a turban can signify the tribe of the wearer.

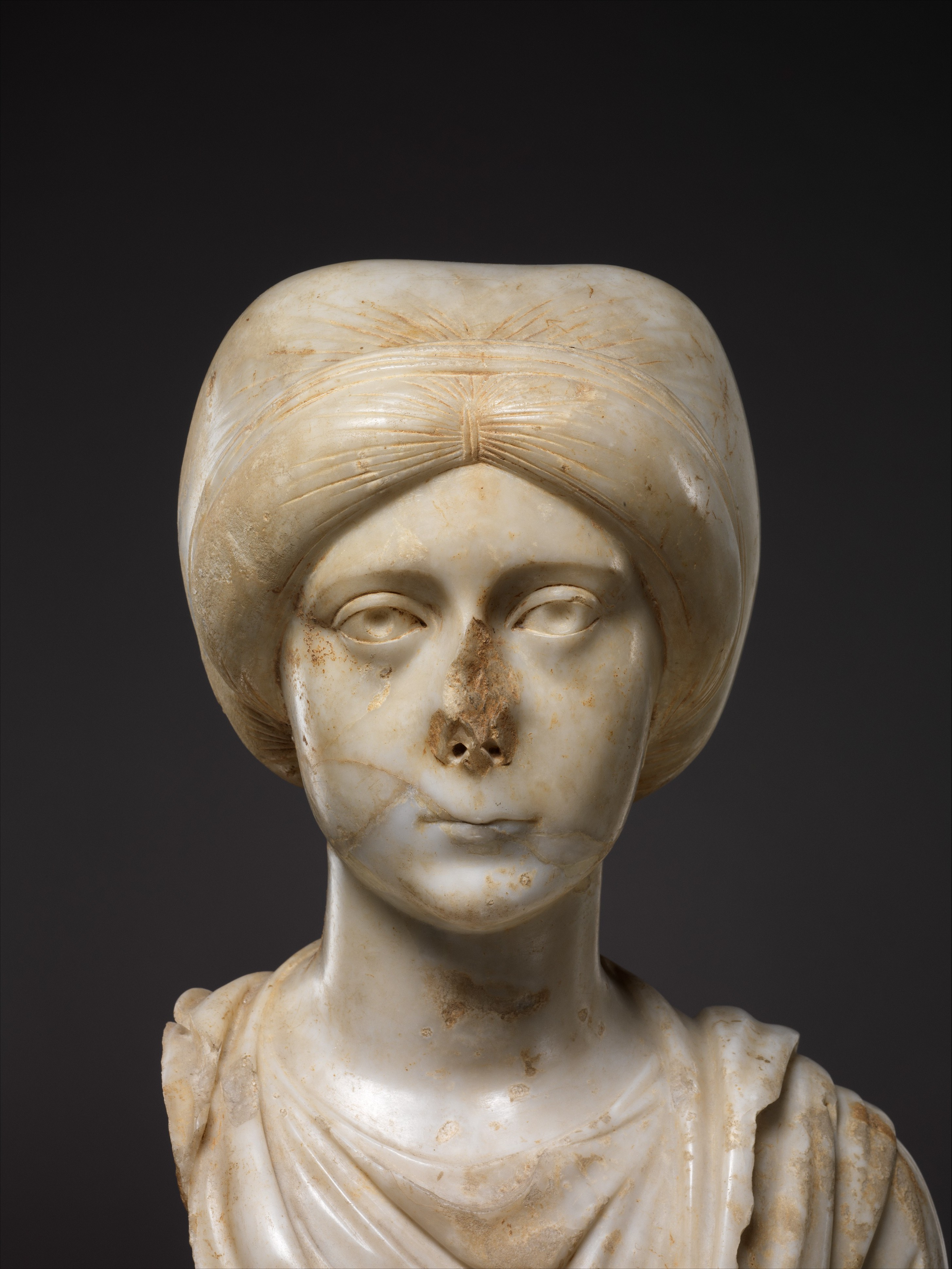
Late fourth century Byzantine woman, wearing a phakeolis.

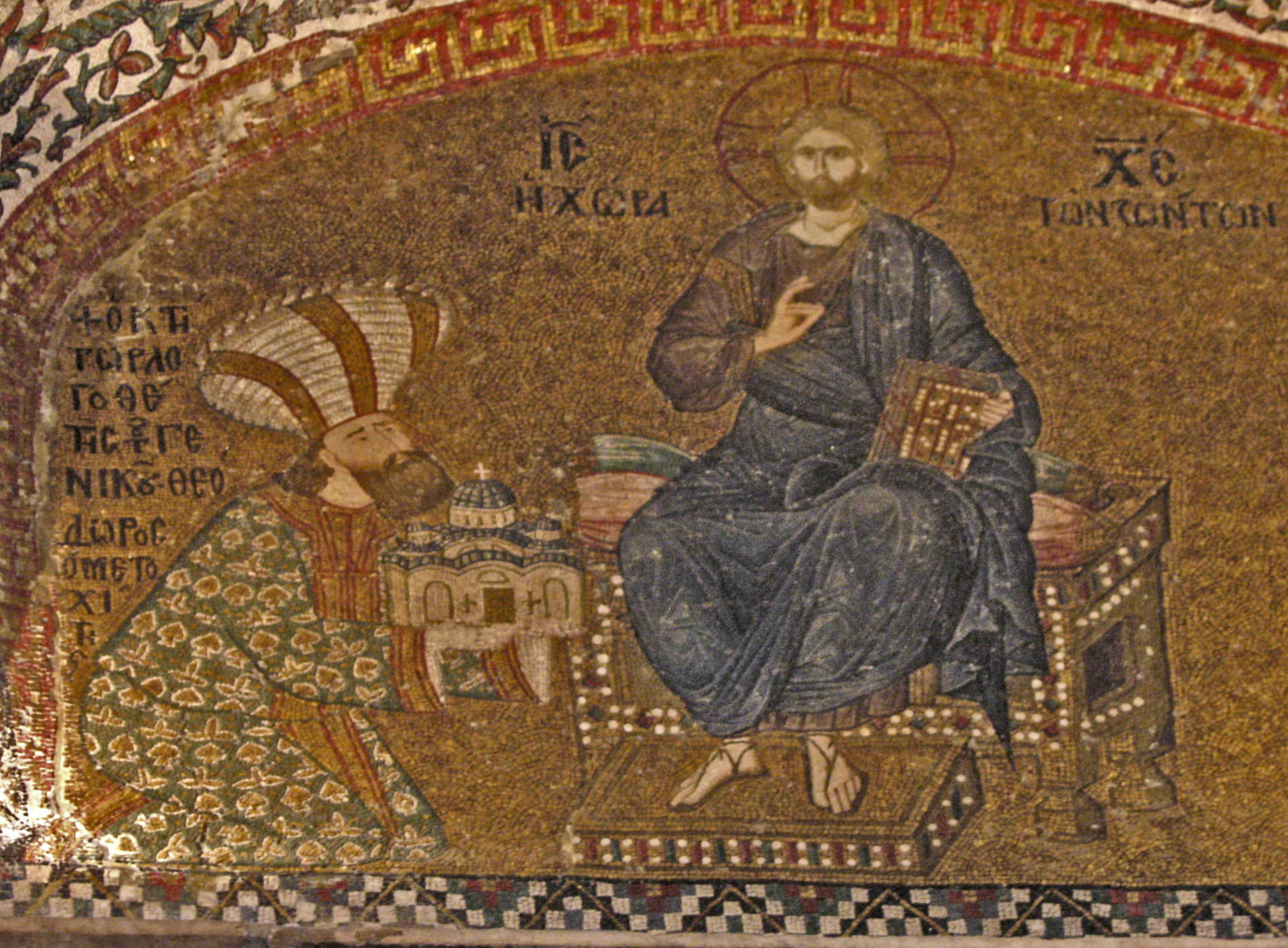
14th century Byzantine, Theodore Metochites, presenting a model of the renovated Chora Church, while wearing a striped turban.

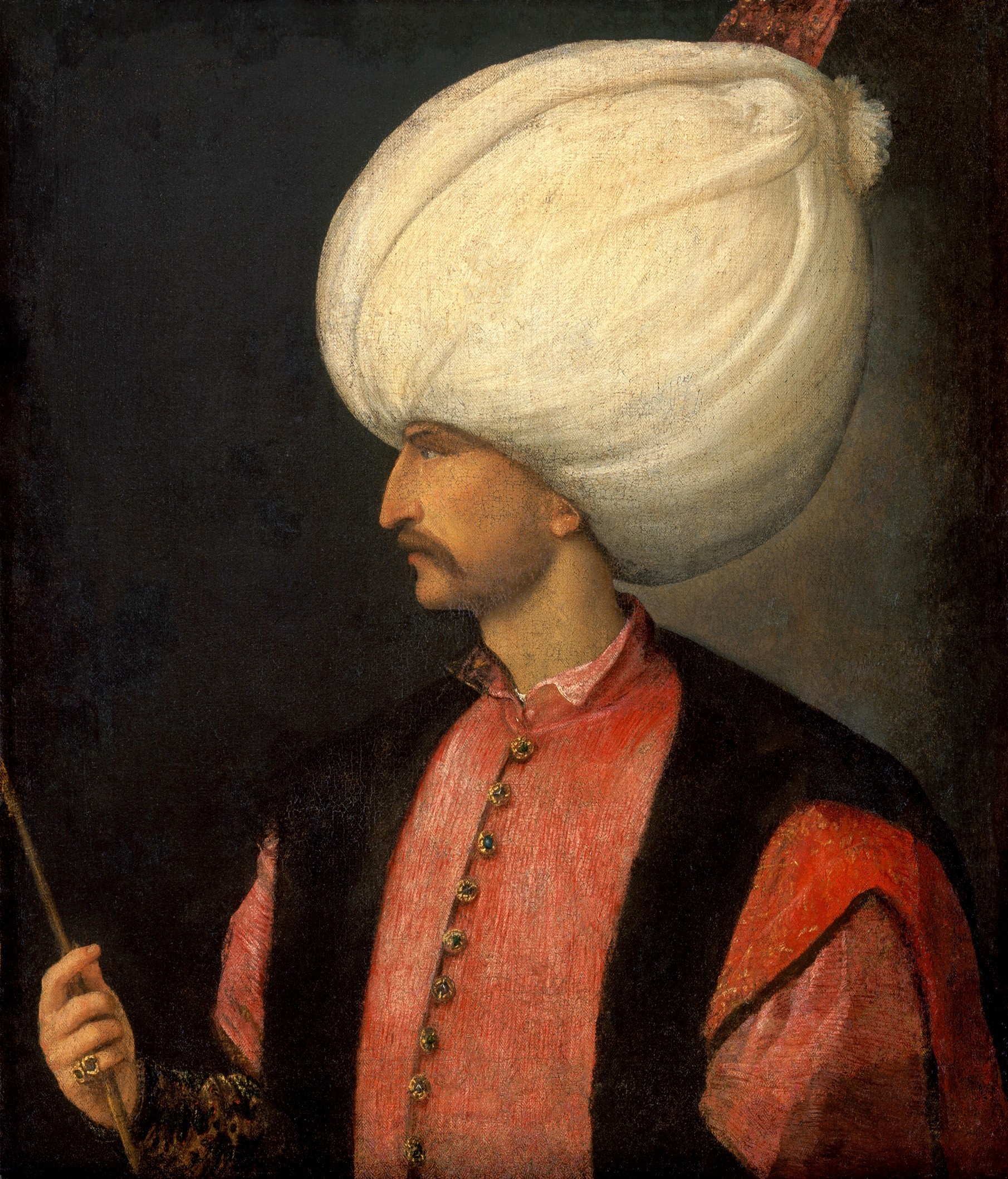
16th century, Suleiman I, wearing the Ottoman imperial turban, known as kavuk.(tr)

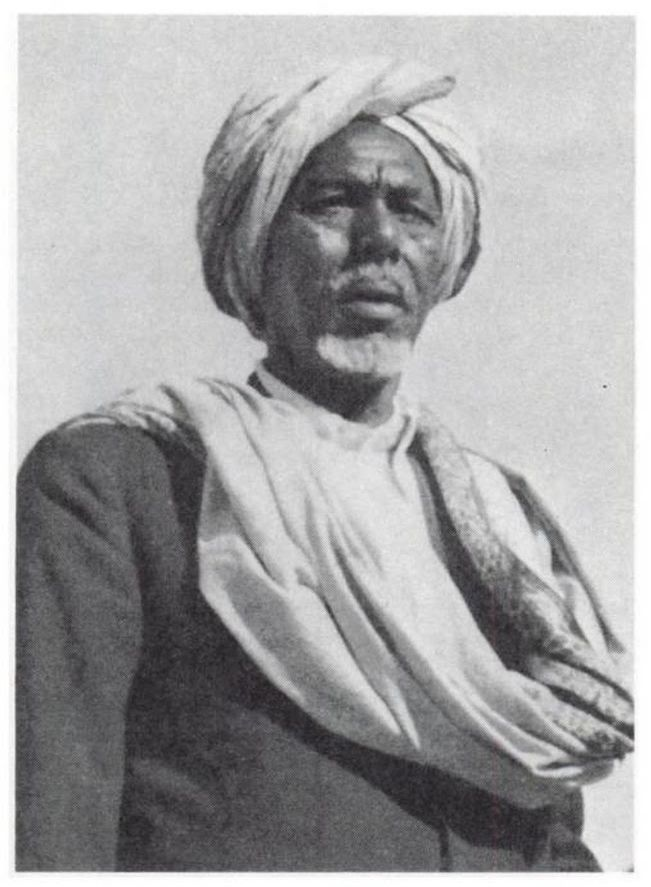
Sultan Abdillahi Deria, fourth Grand Sultan of the Somali Isaaq Sultanate, wearing a turban.

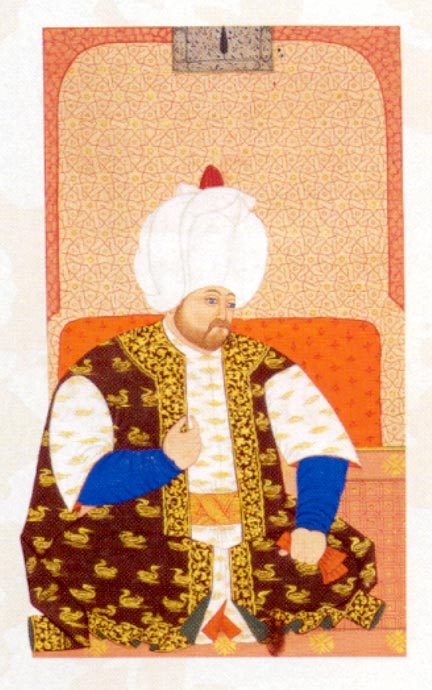
16th century sultan of the Ottoman Empire Selim II wearing the Ottoman imperial turban, known as kavuk

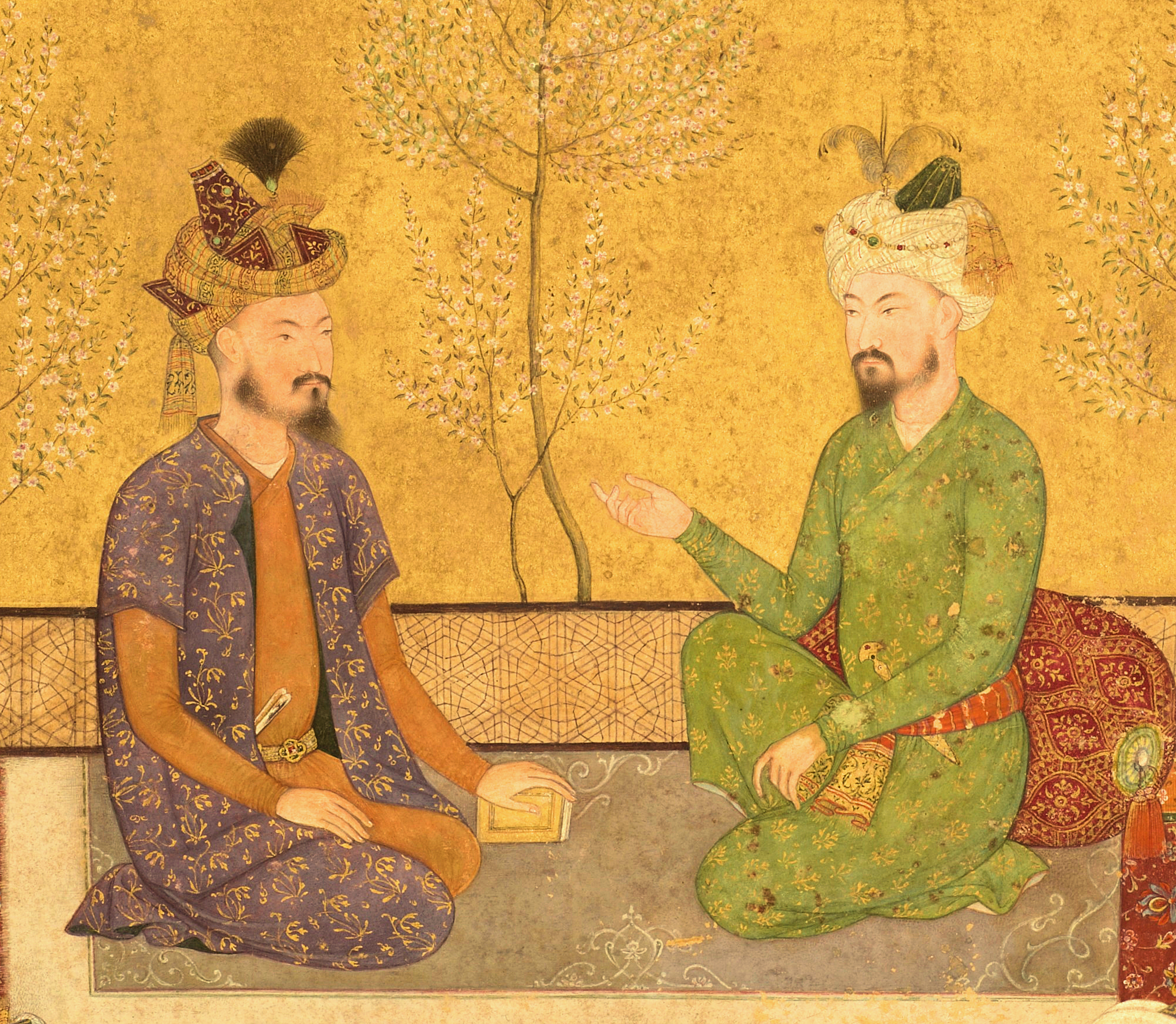
16th century Mughal Emperor Babur and his heir Humayun wearing turbans (ca 1640).

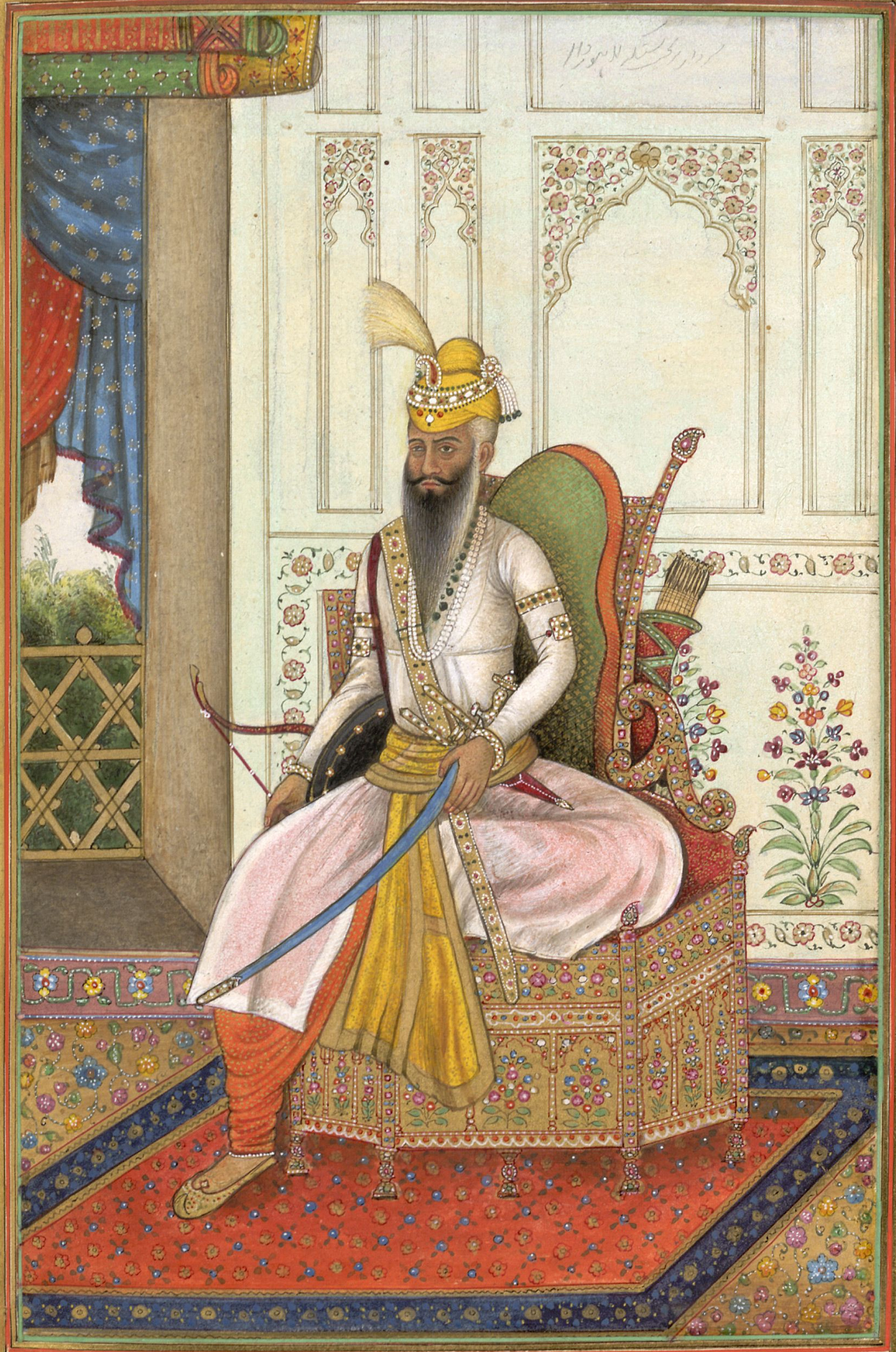
Maharaja Ranjit Singh, founder of the Sikh Empire, wearing a decorated turban (1830).

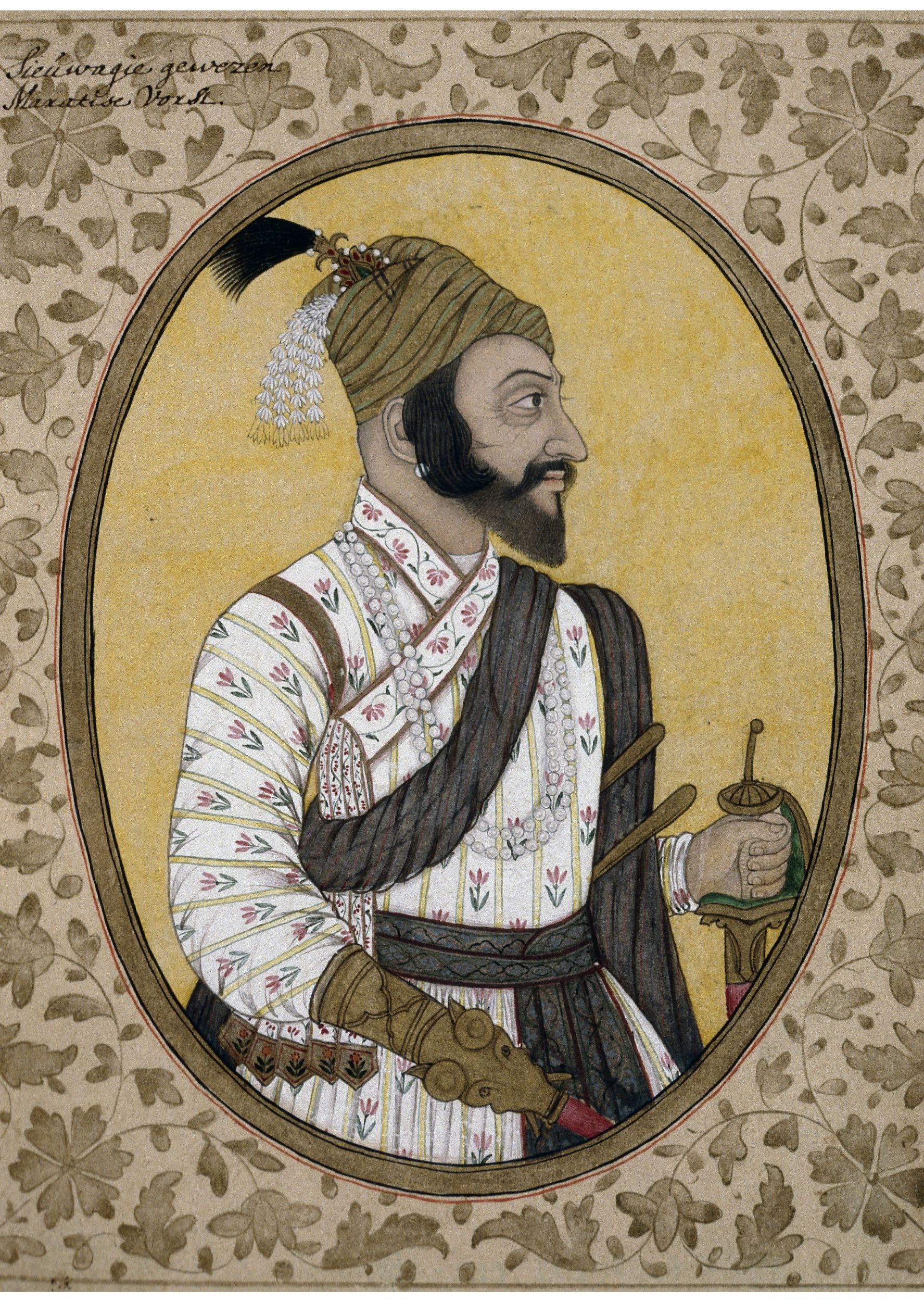
Late 17th century Maratha emperor Shivaji wearing a turban and its ornaments.

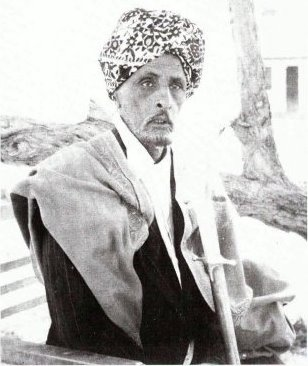
Sultan Mohamoud Ali Shire of the Somali Warsangali clan wearing a turban (1905).

Baroque depiction of Abraham wearing a turban, by Guercino, oil on canvas (1657).

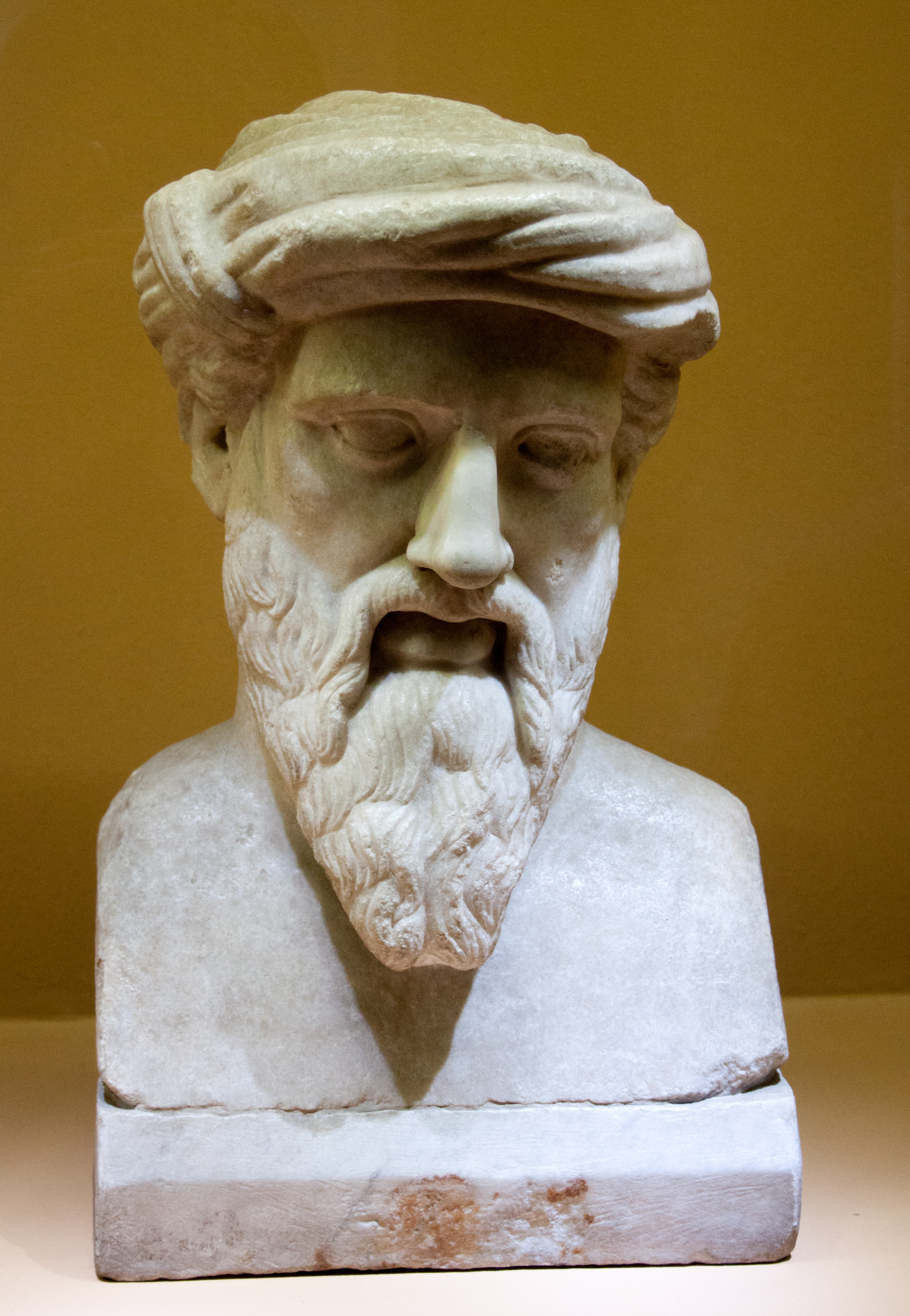
Roman copy of a Greek bust featuring Pythagoras of Samos wearing a turban (2nd–1st century BCE).

== National styles ==
=== Asia ===
==== Afghanistan ====
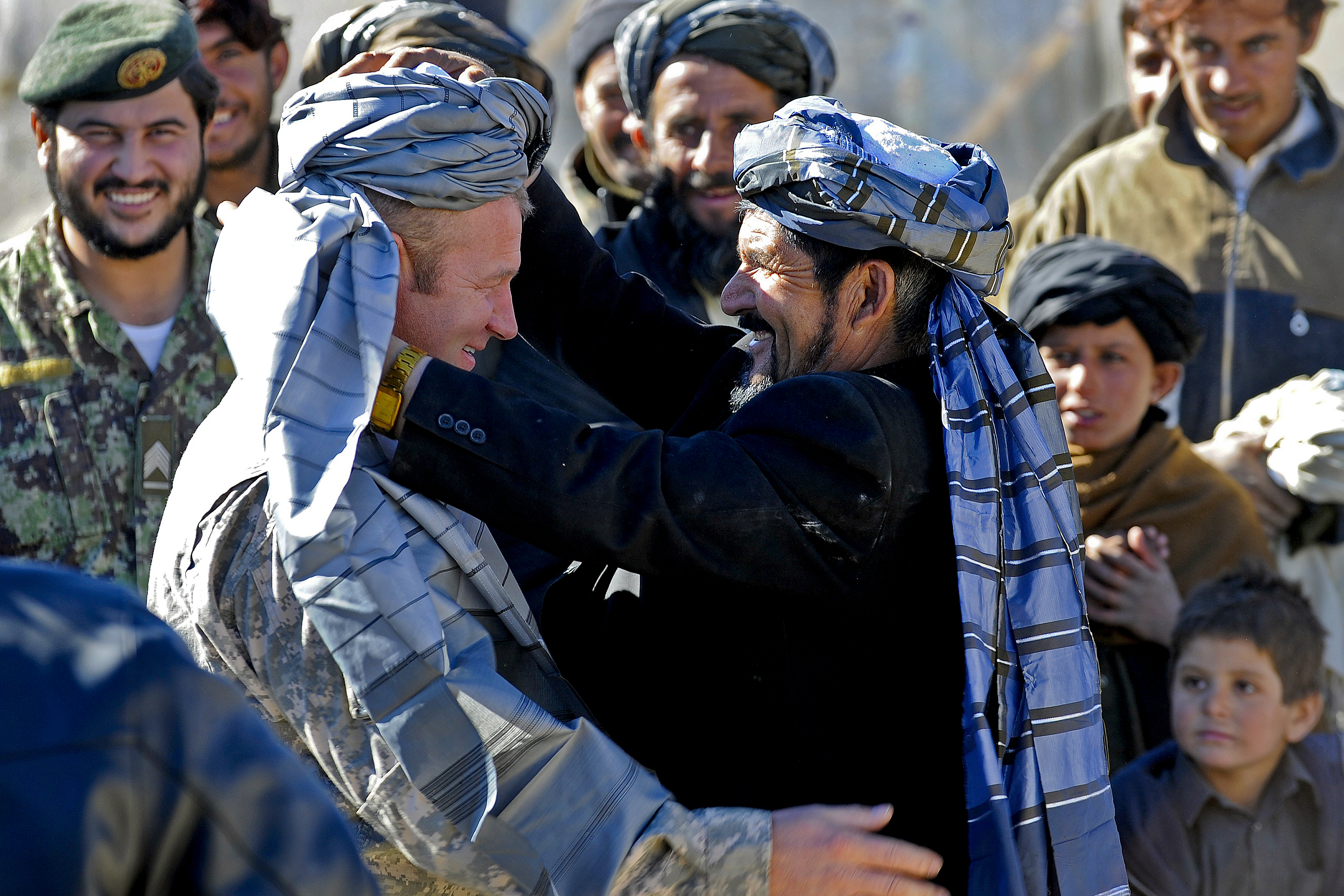
Afghan Lungee presentation

Turbans are part of the national dress in Afghanistan. In the Uruzgan Province, male government employees are required to wear the Imama. They are used more widely than elsewhere in the Muslim world, and are worn in a wide range of styles and colours. In the country's south-east, turbans are wrapped loosely and largely, whereas in Kabul the garment tends to be smaller and tighter. In traditional Afghan society, a related piece of extra cloth called a patu serves practical purposes, such as for wrapping oneself against the cold, to sit on, to tie up an animal or to carry water in the cap. Different ethnic groups in Afghanistan wear different lungees with different patterns, way of styling it, fabric, stripes, lengths and colouration. Males of all ethnic backgrounds generally avoid wearing bright-coloured turbans that draw attention to oneself and prefer wearing simple colours that are white, off white, grey, dark blue and black.

==== China ====
In China and its frontiers, turbans were worn, primarily by ethnic minorities with Turkic or Islamic cultural influence.

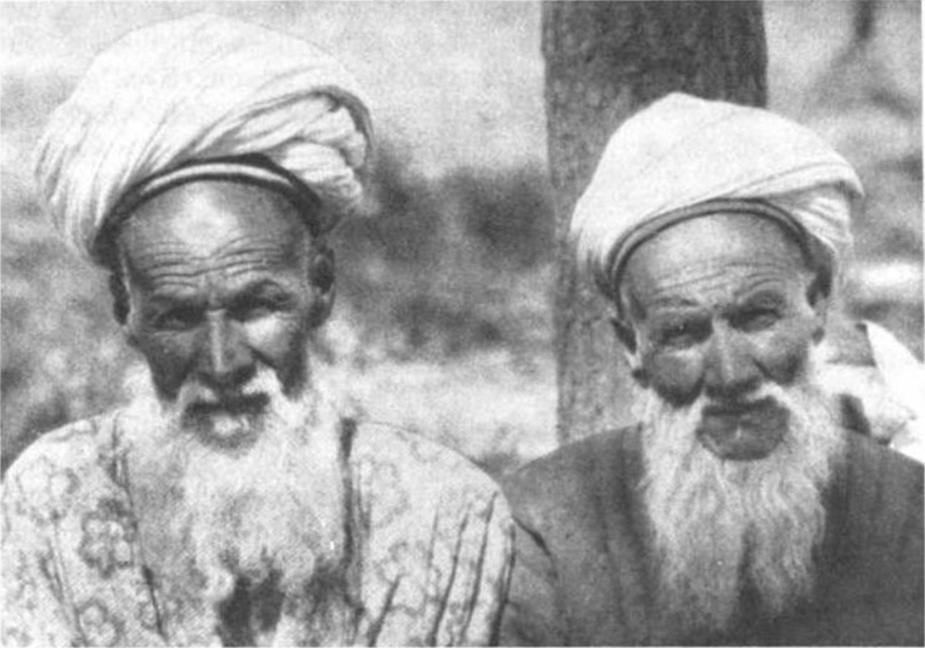
Uyghurs in Xinjiang wearing turbans

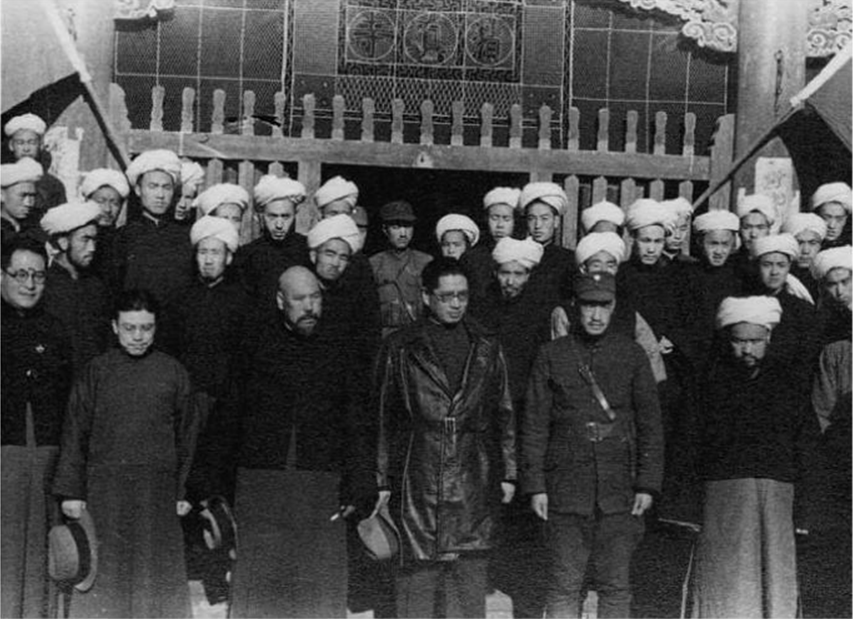
T. V. Soong and Ma Bufang with Hui People wearing turbans at the Xining Dongguan Mosque in Qinghai

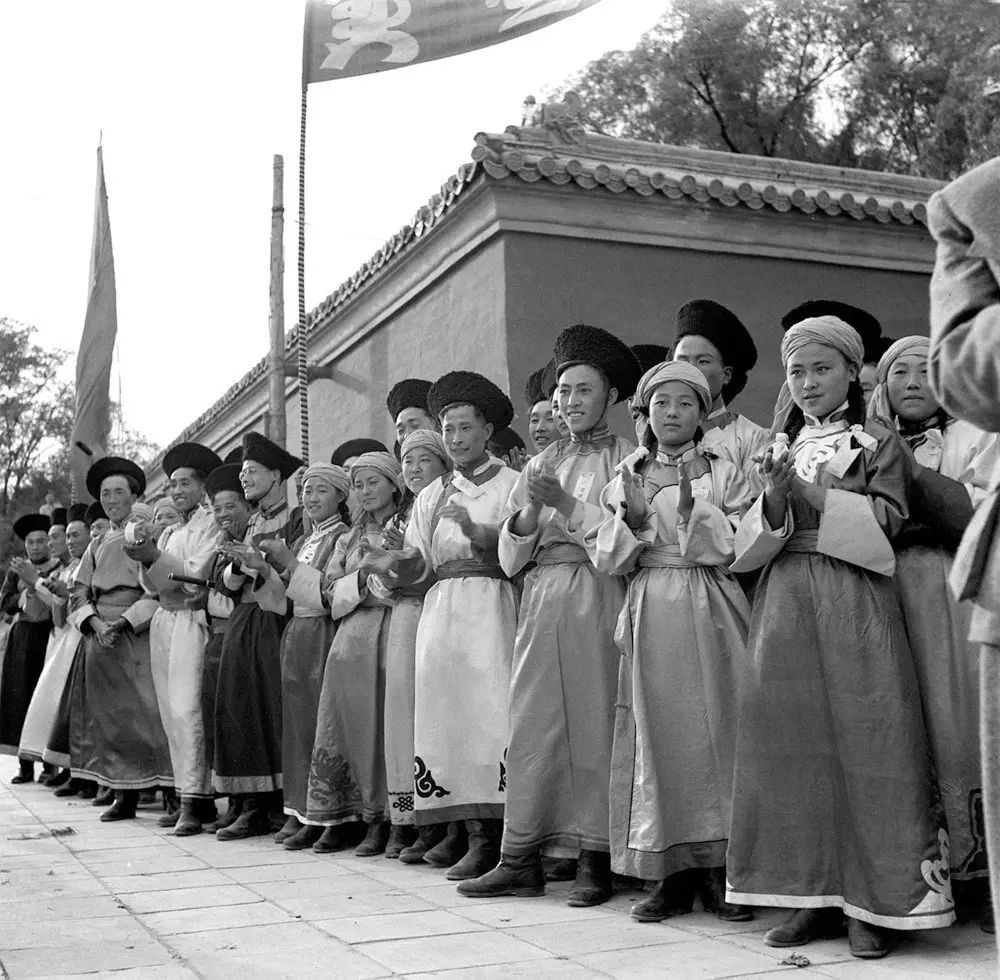
Mongols wearing turbans in 1950 at Tian'anmen Square in Beijing

==== Indian subcontinent ====
In India, the turban is referred to as a pagri, meaning the headdress that is worn by men and is manually tied. There are several styles, which are specific to the wearer's region or religion, and they vary in shape, size and colour. For example, the Mysore Peta, the Marathi pheta, and the Puneri Pagadi. The pagri is a symbol of honour and respect everywhere it is worn. It is a common practice to honour important guests by offering them one to wear.

Colours are often chosen to suit the occasion or circumstance: for example saffron, associated with valour or sacrifice (martyrdom), is worn during rallies; white, associated with peace, is worn by elders; and pink, associated with spring, is worn during that season or for marriage ceremonies.

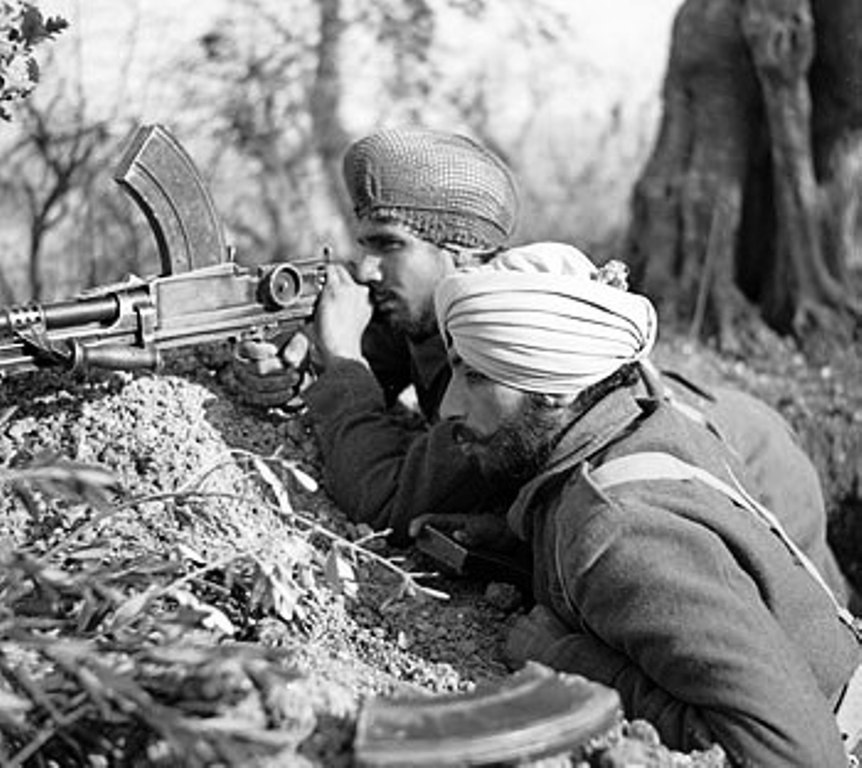
Indian Sikh soldiers in Italian campaign with a Bren gun.

In World War II, some soldiers in the Indian Army were required to wear a turban. The Free India Legion also wore turbans.

In the Indian state of Rajasthan a turban, known as pagri or safa, is a traditional headwear that is an integral part of the state's cultural identity. It is typically made from cotton, silk, or a blend of fabrics and can vary in length. The safa (Parna) is usually around 1 to 4.5 meters (3 ft 3 in to 14 ft 9 in) long, while the pagri can be about 10 meters (33 ft). Some of the most popular turbans in Rajasthan include Jodhpuri safa.

In Bangladesh, the turban is known as pagri, or fagri in Chittagong and Sylhet. The most common colour worn is white, and generally it is the Sufis that wear green turbans. It is also worn by elders in rural areas as a symbol of honour and respect.

The turban in Nepal is commonly worn in rural areas by males. The rural turban is called either a Pagdi or Pheta. It is common among farmers. All types of coloured clothes were used for Pheta. Historically, Gorkhali nobleman used to wear white turban called Shirpau awarded by the King of Nepal. For example; Sardar Ram Krishna Kunwar was awarded with 22 pairs of headgear called Shirpau by the Gorkhali monarch Maharajadhiraj Prithvi Narayan Shah. It was common among aristocrats in other contemporary kingdoms. Rulers and vassal lords also adapted a crest to the white turban.

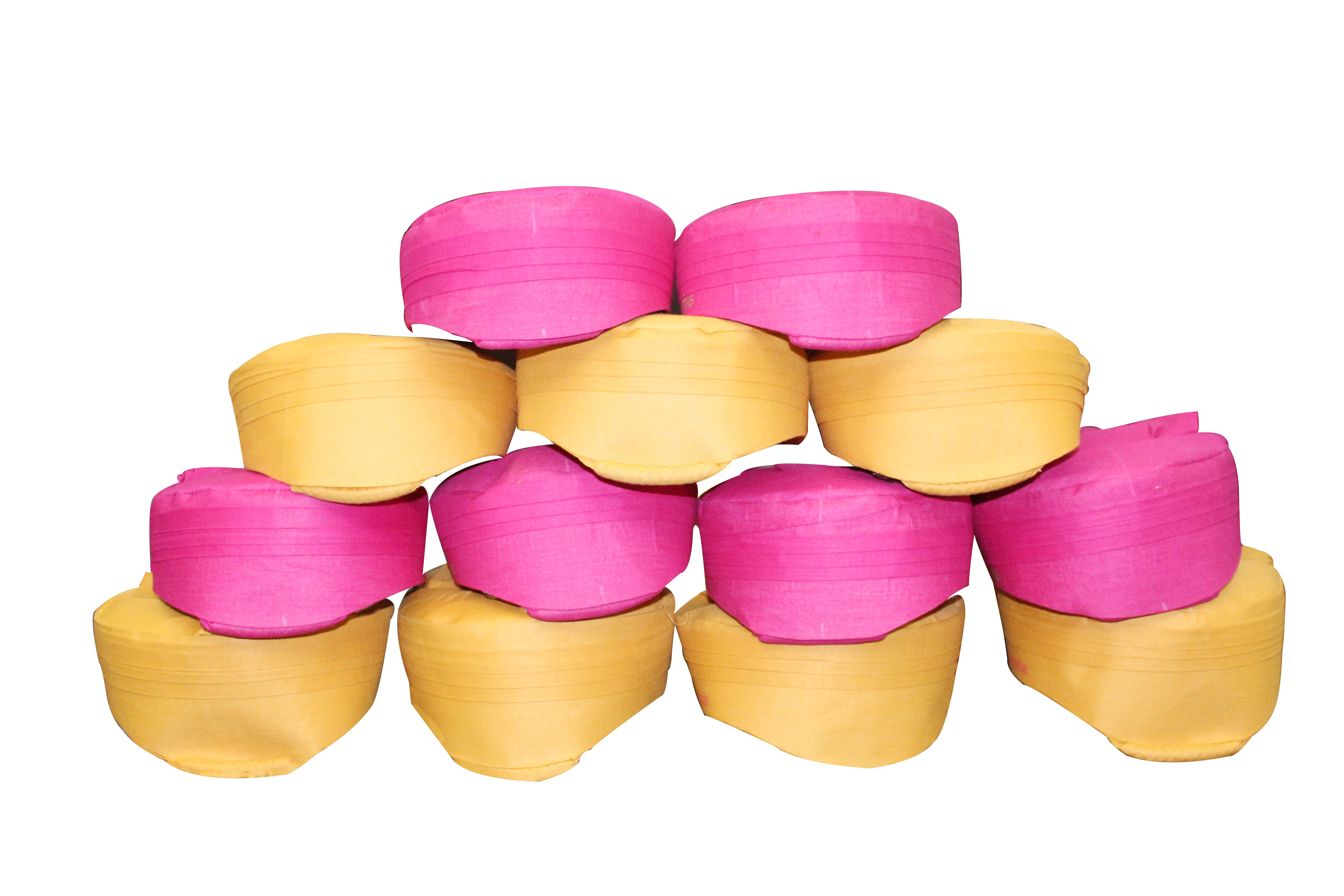
Paag of Mithilalok

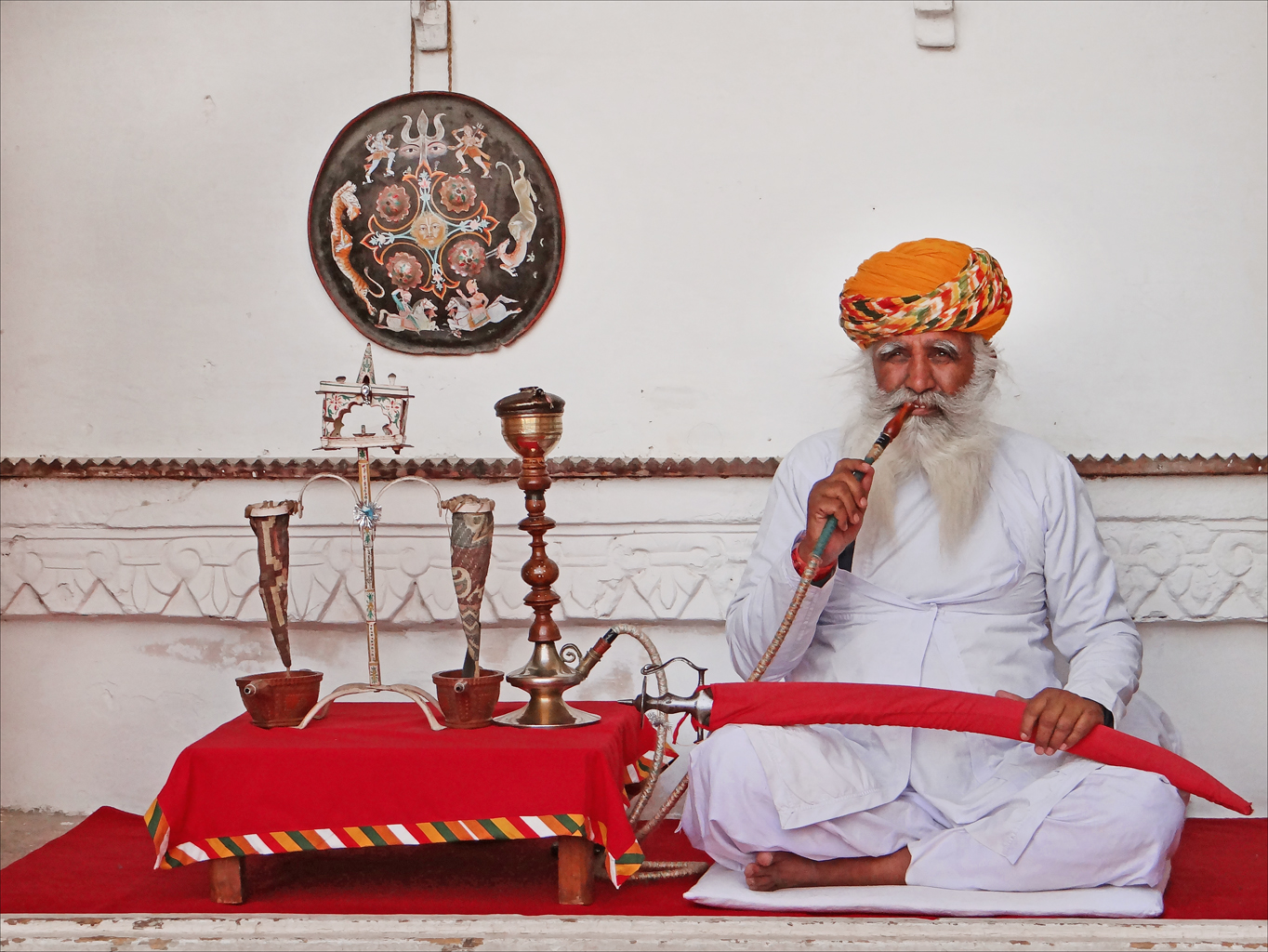
A man from India, wearing a Rajasthani paggar style of turban

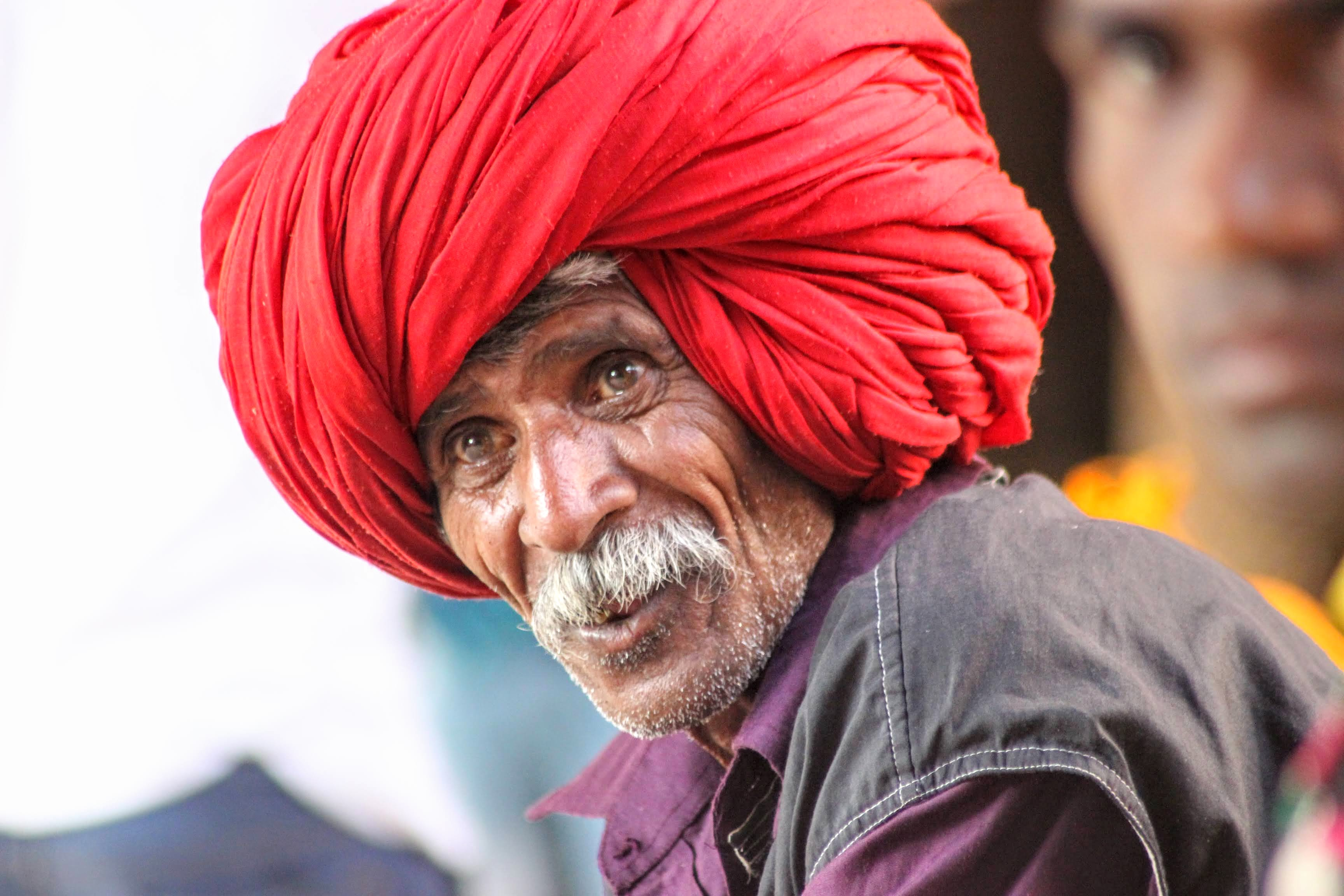
A man from Madhya Pradesh wearing a turban

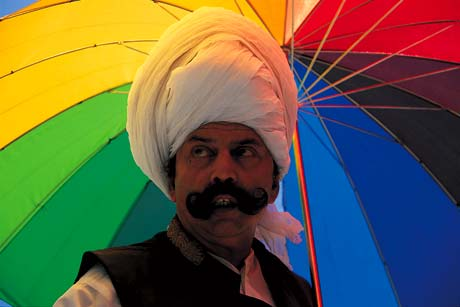
Malik Ata Muhammad Khan, Nawab of Kot Fateh Khan in Pakistan, wearing a turban made from 6.4 metres (7.0 yards) of cloth

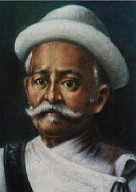
Nepalese Sardar Bhakti Thapa, a Gorkhali nobleman wearing aristocratic white Shirpau turban

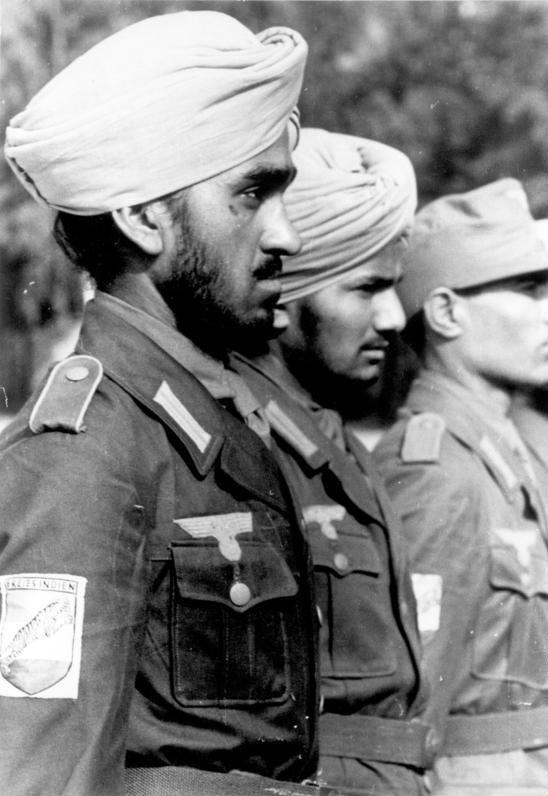
Free India Legion soldiers wearing turbans.

=== Europe ===
==== United Kingdom ====
In the United Kingdom, turbans have been worn by men and women since the sixth century without ever becoming very common. Poet Alexander Pope is sometimes depicted wearing a turban, as were other notable men seen in contemporary paintings and illustrations. The common use of turbans on less formal occasions, among gentlemen at the time, reflects that their heads were closely cropped, or shaved, to allow the wearing of the elaborate wigs that were the fashion in Europe in the century from about 1650 to 1750, and when wigs were off, some kind of head cover was useful. Hence, the turban.

Now that hats are infrequently worn, turbans too are relatively uncommon. They are worn primarily by women of West Indian descent, Karinas. Some women wear them to make a statement of individuality, such as the British social entrepreneur Camila Batmanghelidjh, who usually wore a colourful matching turban and robe.

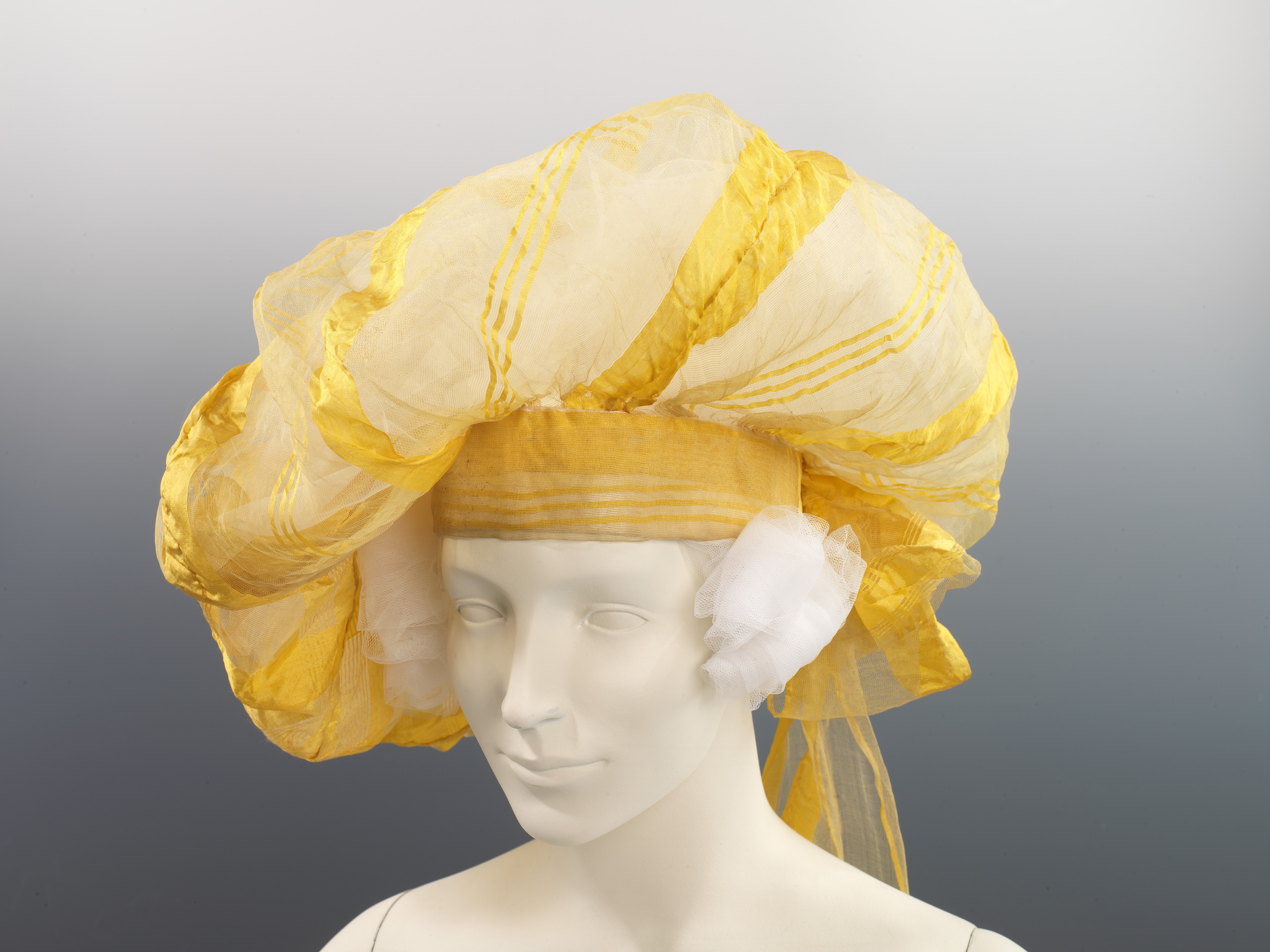
The "à la turque" style of this British headdress from c. 1820, influenced and inspired by the popular interest in Eastern cultures, was popular in the 1820s.

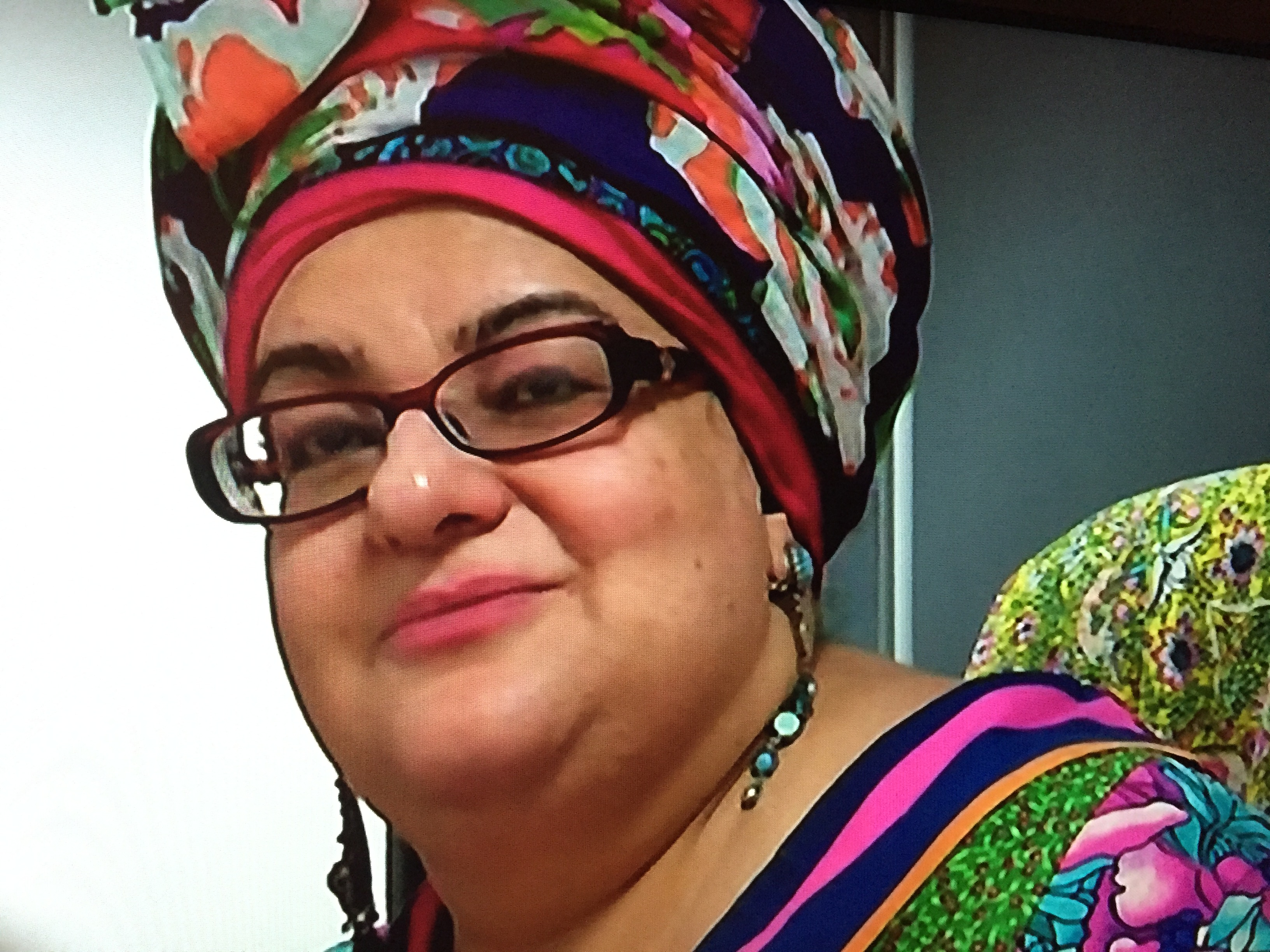
Camila Batmanghelidjh, charity founder.

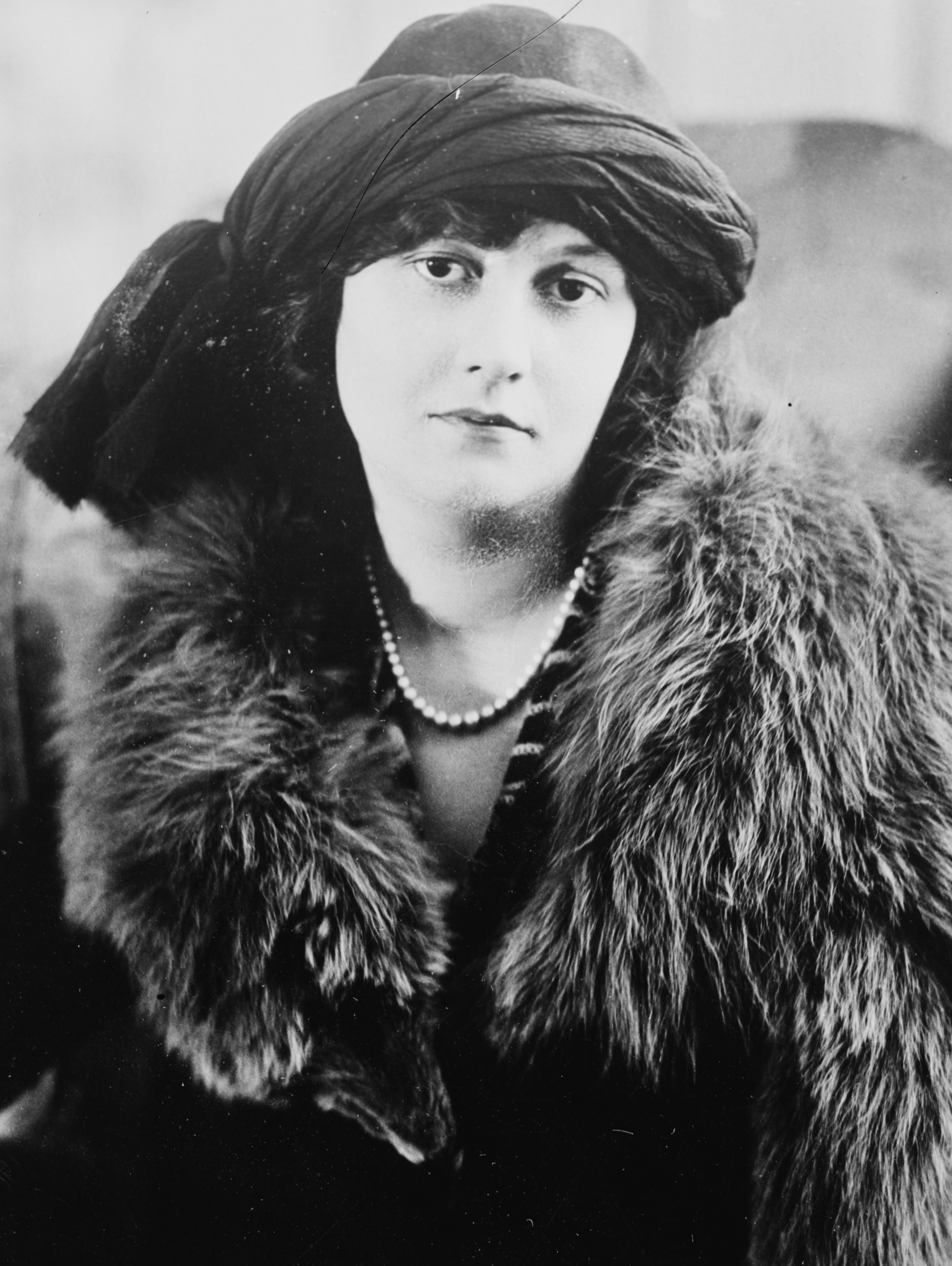
Elizabeth Bibesco, actress.

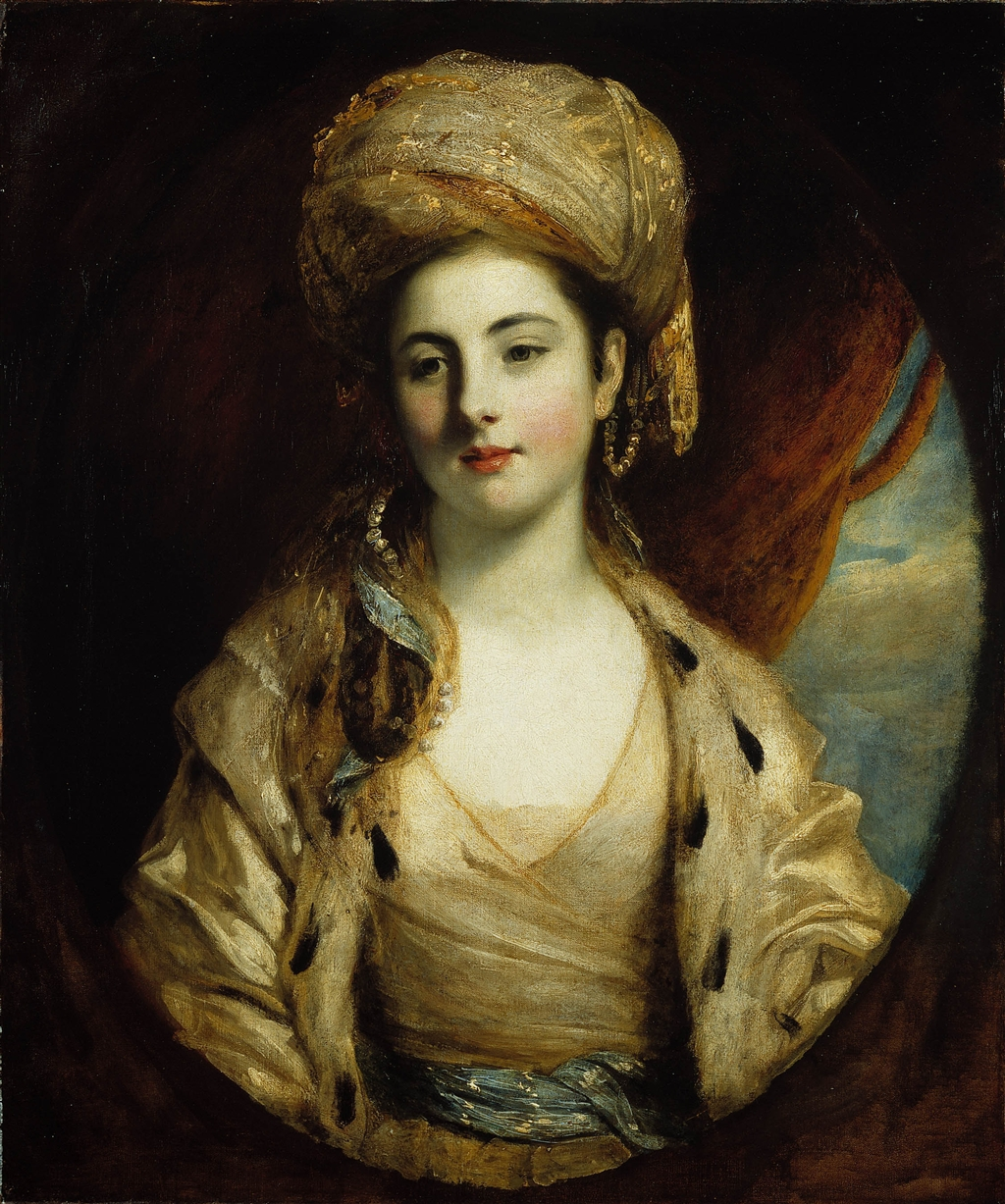
Vertue Jodrell.

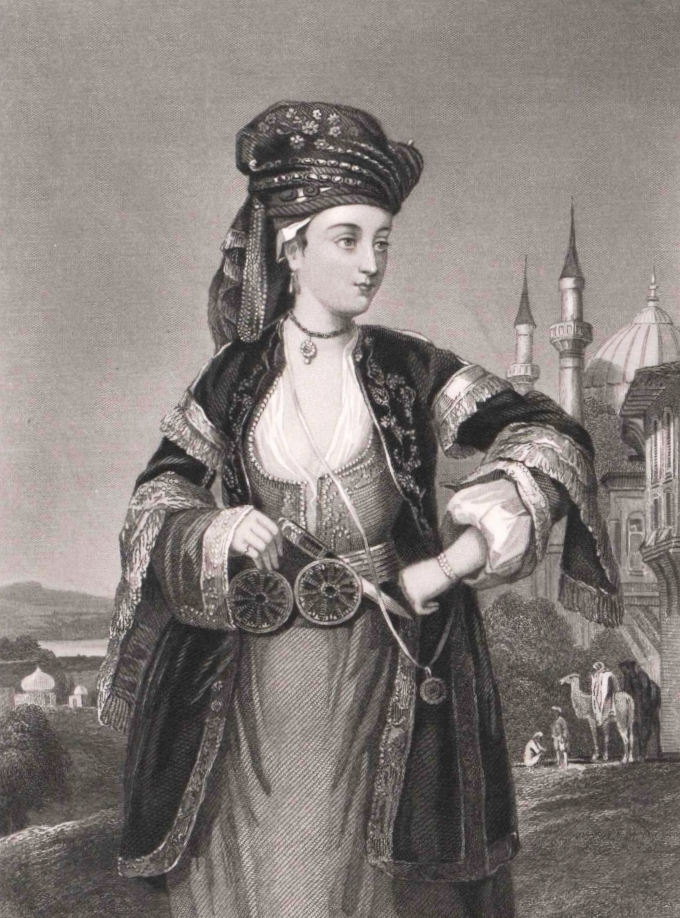
Mary Wortley Montagu, medical pioneer, writer, and poet.

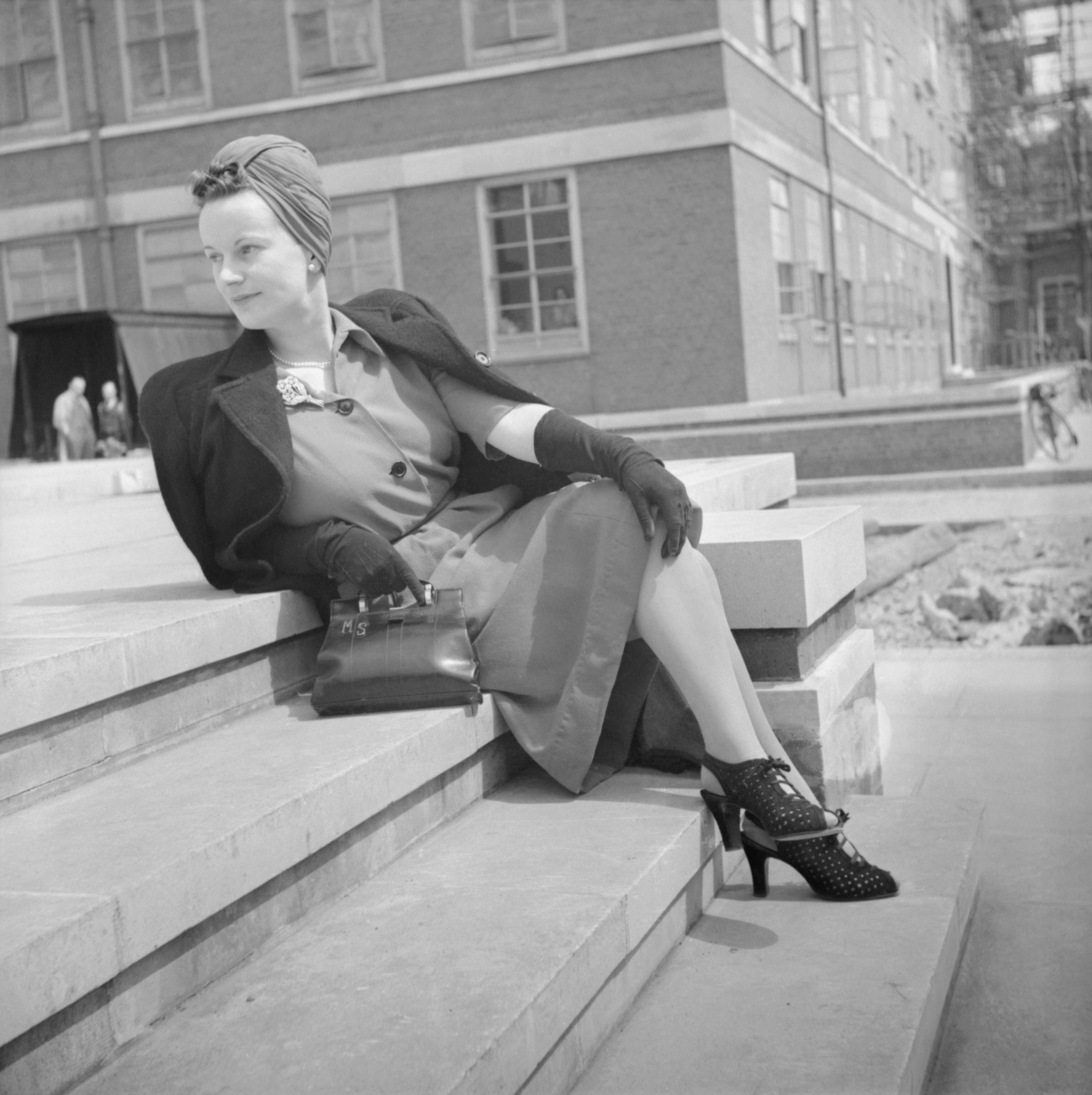
World War 2 style.

==== Albania ====
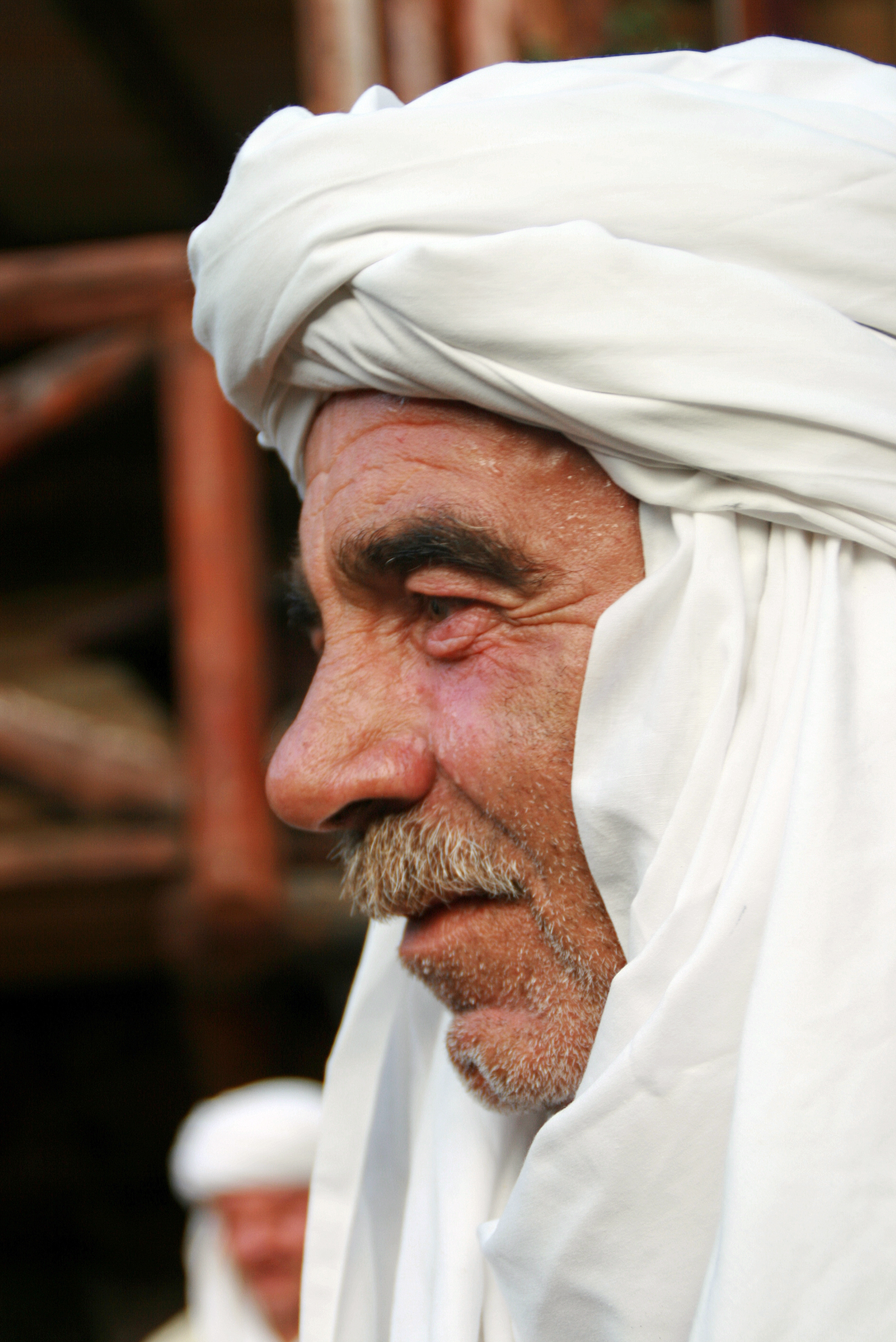
Albanian Rugova man in shall turban.

In Northern Albania and some regions of Kosovo, particularly among highlanders, men traditionally wear a long, white turban-like cloth known as a shall or shalla. It is over three meters long and is worn from age 7 onwards, then used as a burial shroud after death. It is often worn over the qeleshe (plis), the traditional Albanian felt cap, to protect from the elements. The shall is most commonly worn in the Malësia regions and the Rugova highlands of Kosovo, though it is only seen in traditional folk attire and cultural ceremonies.

==== Greece ====
In Greece, specifically the island of Crete, the men traditionally wear a lightly knitted turban known as a sariki. The headwrap's name is borrowed from sarık, the Turkish word for turban. Today, it may be more commonly known as a kritiko mandili (Cretan kerchief). It is only found in the folklore Cretan dress and not amongst the population, with the exception of older men in remoter, mountainous villages.

=== Fiji ===
iTaukei indigenous chiefs and priests were known to have worn masi (barkcloth) coverings around their head similar to a turban, called an i-sala. However, most of the bulk and shape of the i-sala came from the bushy hair under the cloth.

=== Armenia ===
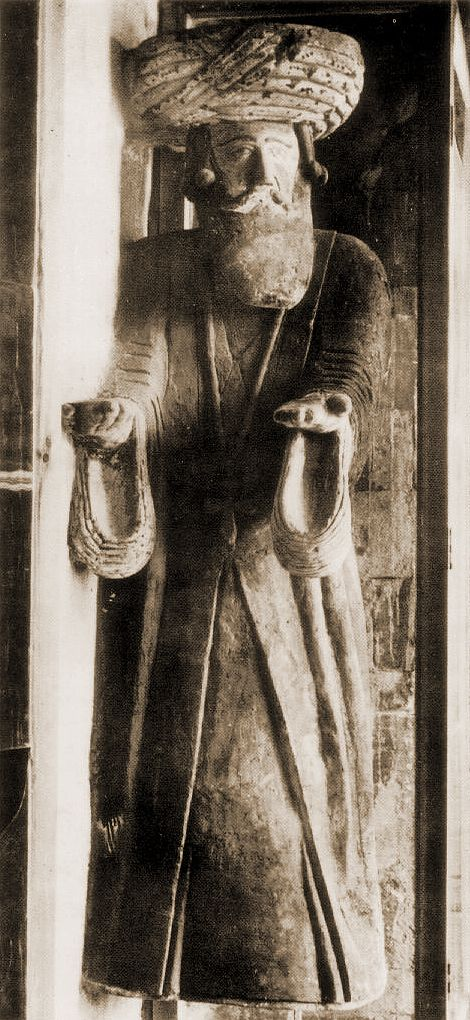
Statue of Gagik I of Armenia wearing a turban.

Though not common in daily apparel, turbans are sometimes worn by men ceremonially (often with beards), as a symbol of national identity during celebrations and festivals. However, before Armenia became a Christian nation, turbans were a common part of the daily apparel, just as in other Middle Eastern countries.

=== Other ===
On the Swahili Coast, turbans were frequently worn by the ruling Omani Sultans of Zanzibar and their retinue.

Tuareg Berbers, and some northern Berbers, Sahrawi, Songhai, Wodaabe, Fulani, and Hausa peoples of North and West Africa wear varieties of turbans. Tuareg Berbers often veil the face to block dust. This Tuareg-Berber turban is known as a tagelmust, and is often blue. The Bedouin tribes in North Africa sometimes wear brown-beige, white or orange turbans. Colombian politician Piedad Cordoba was known to wear turbans (or a similar headgear). Her use of turbans had made her so distinguishable to the point of having earned the nickname "the lady with the turban" in Colombian popular culture.

Kurdish people wear a turban, which they call a jamadani. It is worn in many different ways across Iraqi Kurdistan depending on the style of the locality; e.g. the Barzani Kurds are a tribe which wears the turban in a colour (red and white) and style which is typical of their clan. In most parts of South Kurdistan a black-white pattern is used for Jamadani. Mostly, Kurdish turbans consist of a length of striped cloth known as kolāḡī which is wound around a conical hat; the tassels that border the kolāḡī are allowed to hang down over the face. In modern times, many Kurds use black and white Ghutra and roll them into turbans.

Turbans have also been a type of headwear worn by women in Western countries. The wearing of such turbans by women in Western societies is less common than it was earlier in the 20th century. They are usually sewn to a foundation, so that they can be donned or removed easily. Turbans are also sometimes donned to protect hair or as a headwrap for women following cancer treatments that cause hair loss. They can also be tied together to form a rope in emergency rescue situations. In popular culture, turbans are also sometimes worn as a fashion statement. For example, American rapper Yeat wears turbans often while being photographed and filmed in public. He also has a song titled "Turban".

== In religion ==
=== Sikhism ===
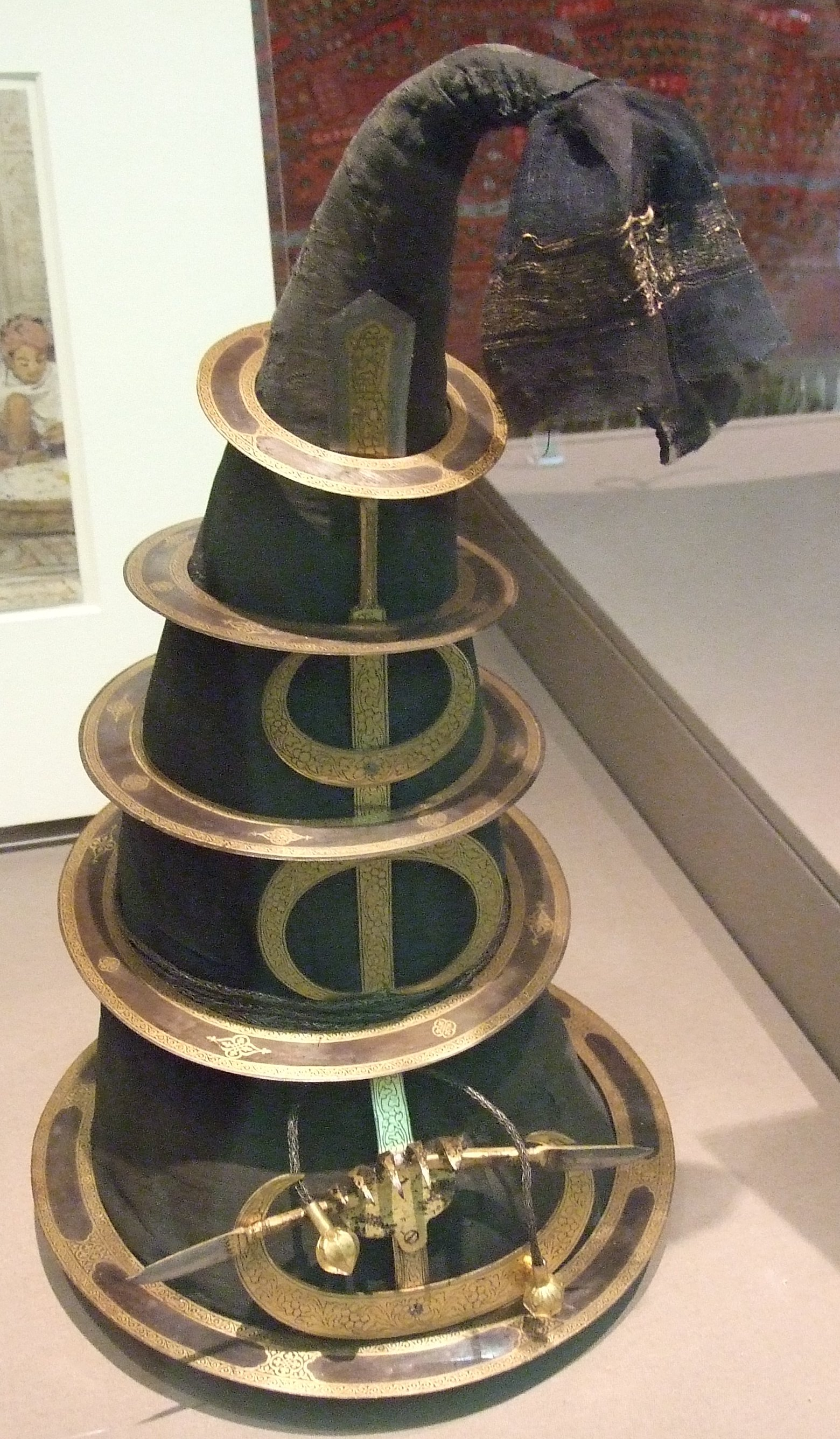
Akali turban cotton over a wicker frame, steel overlaid with gold. Lahore Mid-19th century, "A tall conical turban provided convenient transportation for a number of sharp steel chakrams – edged weapons hurled to lethal effect by the practised hand of the Akalis."

The Sikh turban, known mainly as the dastar but also the dumalla, is used to show others that they represent the embodiment of Sikh teachings, the love of the Guru and dogma to do good deeds. The Gurus ensured that both men and women are able to wear a turban, which shows another action of equality. Other Purposes of the turban include protecting Sikhs' long unshorn hair and keeping it clean.

Sikhs do not cut their hair, as a religious observance. The turban protects the hair and keeps it clean. As Sikhs form 1.7% of India's population and 1.5% of Canada's population, their turbans help identify them. When he institutionalised the turban as a part of the Sikh identity, Guru Gobind Singh said, "My Sikh will be recognized among millions".

Turbans were formerly associated with the upper class, and many men in the cultural elite still wear turbans. This distinction between the turban-wearing upper class (Sardars) and commoners promoted segregation and elitism. In order to eliminate the class system associated with turbans, Guru Gobind Singh declared each and every Sikh a Sardar.

Modern Sikh men mainly wear four kinds of turban: Vattan Wali Turban, Amritsar Shahi Turban, Barnala Shahi and Taksali Dumala. The more traditional Turban styles are the Darbara Singh Dummala, Dastar Bunga (the original turban of the Khalsa) and the Puratan Nok Pagg.

The most common turban colours worn by Sikhs are blue, white and black, although other colours are popular as well. Blue and yellow are particularly prestigious and tend to be worn on religious events such as Vaisakhi. Meanings of the turbans are that the white turban means a saintly person leading an exemplary life, and an off-shade colour of white means someone is learning in the Sikh religion. The blue turban signifies a mind as broad as the sky with no place for prejudice. The black turban serves as a reminder of the Jallianwala Bagh massacre in 1919, and represents humility. The Basanti or yellow turbans are associated with the revolutionary movement, Sardar Bhagat Singh also wore a yellow turban for this reason. Royal blue is usually worn by those who are learned in the Sikh religion and are patriotic about their traditions and culture. The colour green signifies farmers. The orange turban means courage and wisdom. The colour Gold symbolises a sense of calm and healing that helps with anxiety and clearing the mind which significance derives from the Golden temple. Akali Nihang Sikhs decorate their blue turbans or Dumalla by wearing small weapons known as shastars in them. The turban's colour may reflect association with a particular group of Sikhs, although none of the popular turban colours are exclusive to any particular group. The preferred colour of the Sikh wedding is pink. All shades of this colour from magenta to baby pink is used by families for the joyful occasion. Some prefer red, maroon or orange turbans for the weddings, but pink is so far the most popular. Turban colours are generally a matter of personal choice in Sikhism, with many Sikh men choosing colours based on fashion or taste, sometimes to match clothes. There are traditions associated with some colours, for instance orange and black are often worn at political protest rallies whilst red and pink turbans are worn at weddings and other celebratory events.

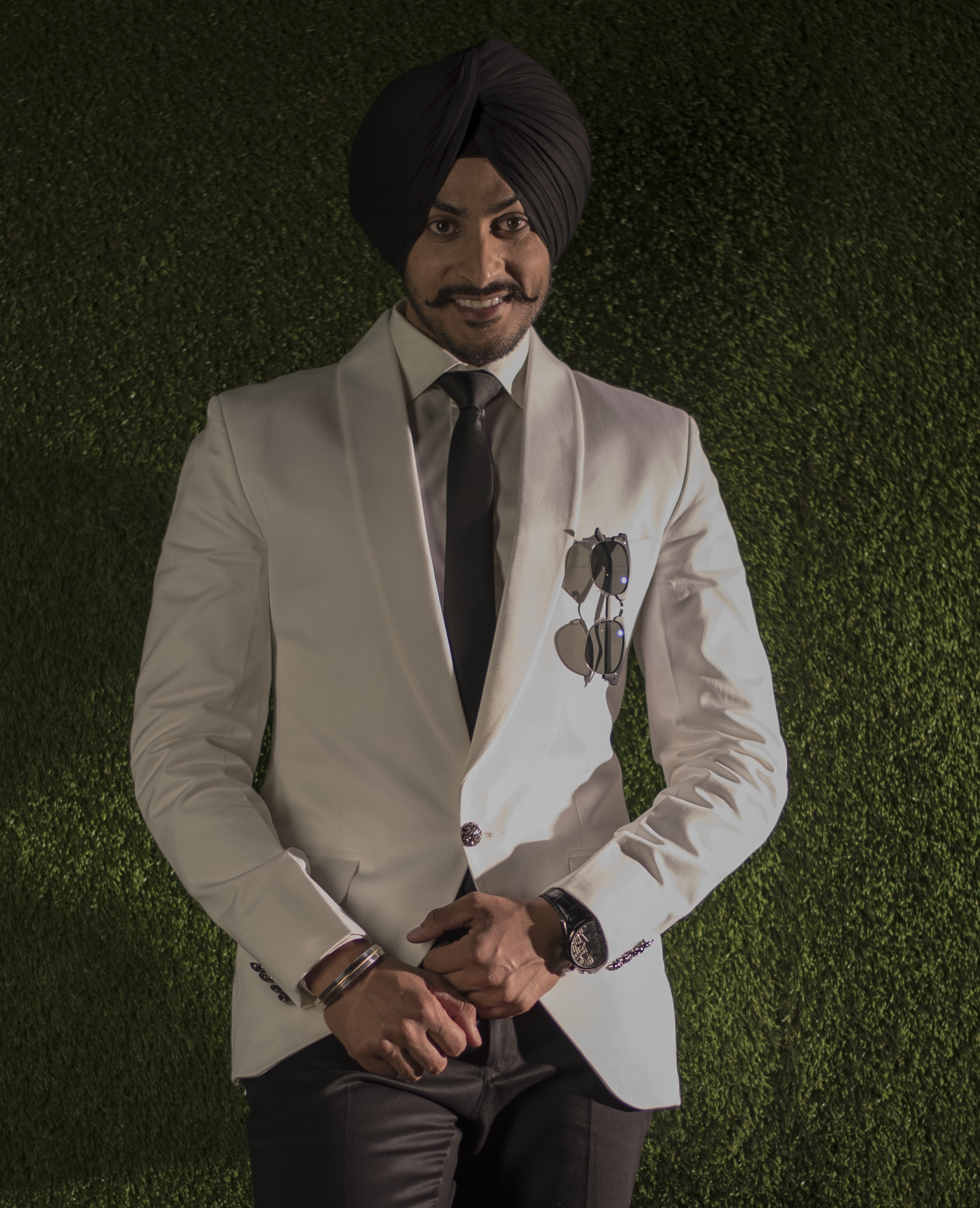
Rajvir Jawanda, a singer and actor

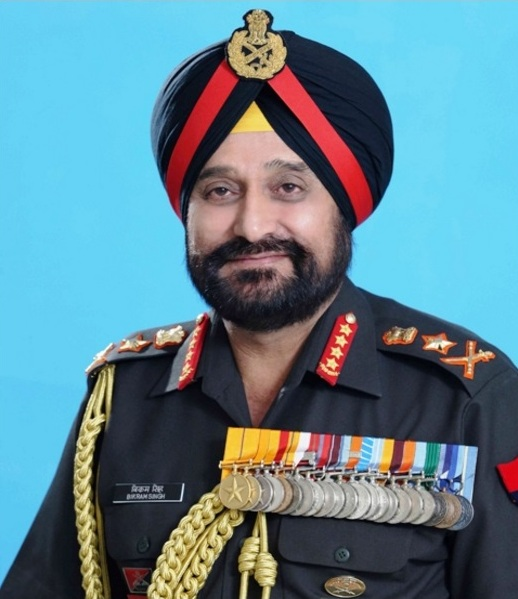
Bikram Singh, former Chairman of the Chiefs of Staff Committee of India

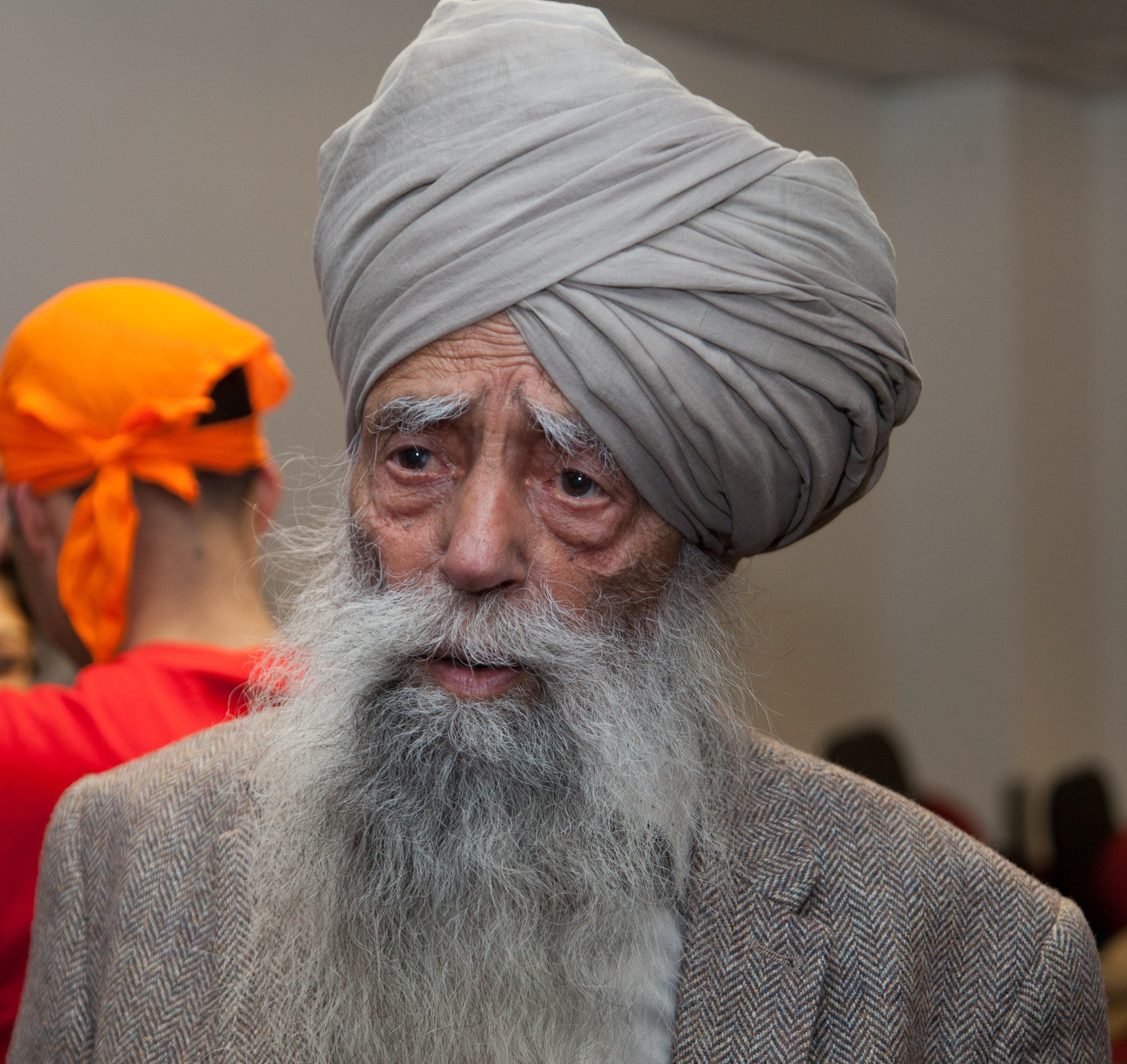
Fauja Singh, a centenarian marathon runner

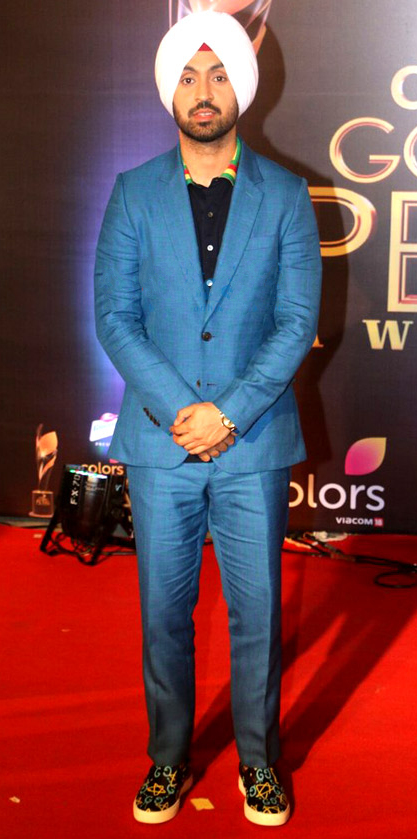
Diljit Dosanjh, an actor, singer, television presenter and social media celebrity

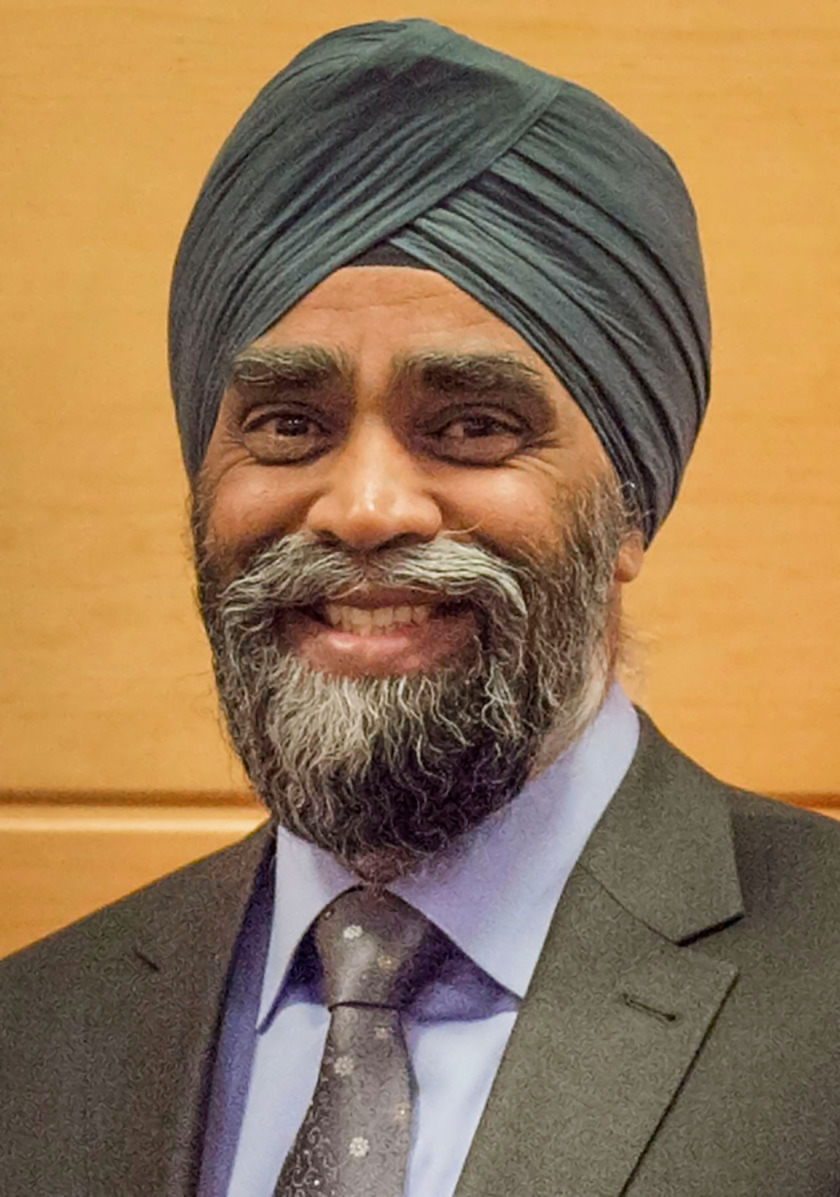
Harjit Singh Sajjan, Member of Parliament and Minister of Emergency Preparedness of Canada

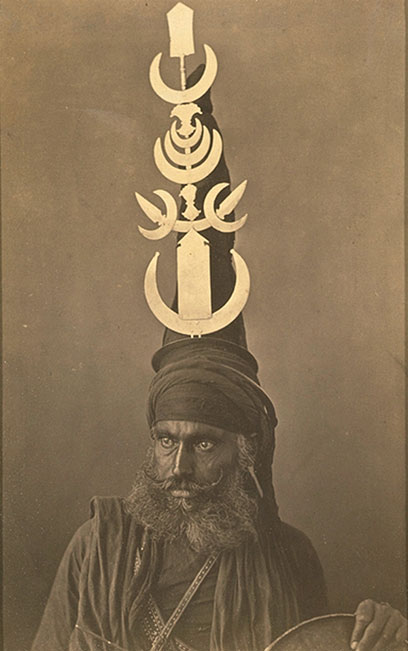
An Orthodox Sikh Nihang with a Dastar Bunga

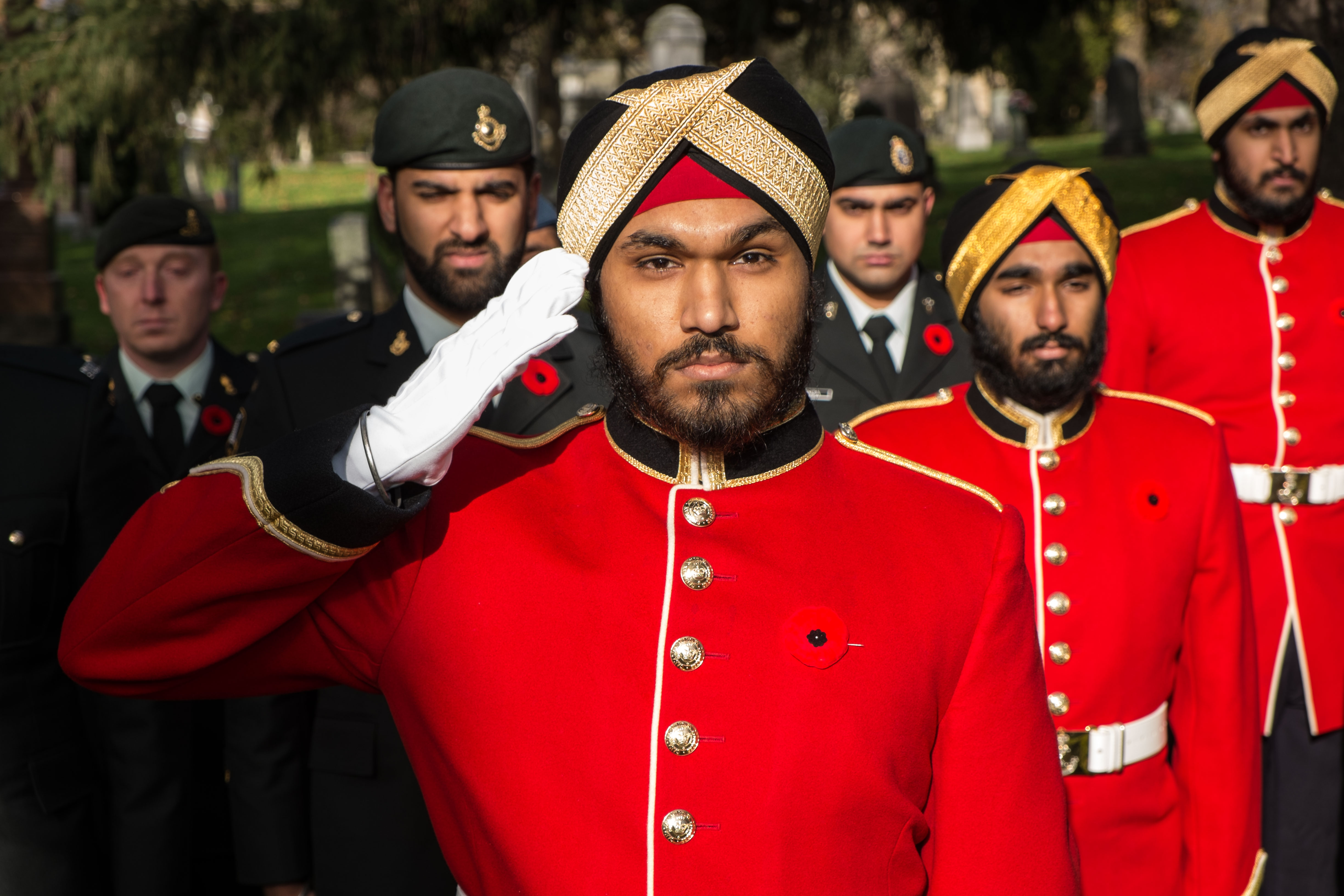
Cdt. Sarabjot Anand, OCdt. Sarbjeet Nijher and OCdt. Saajandeep Sarai represent Royal Military College of Canada at Sikh Remembrance Day 2013

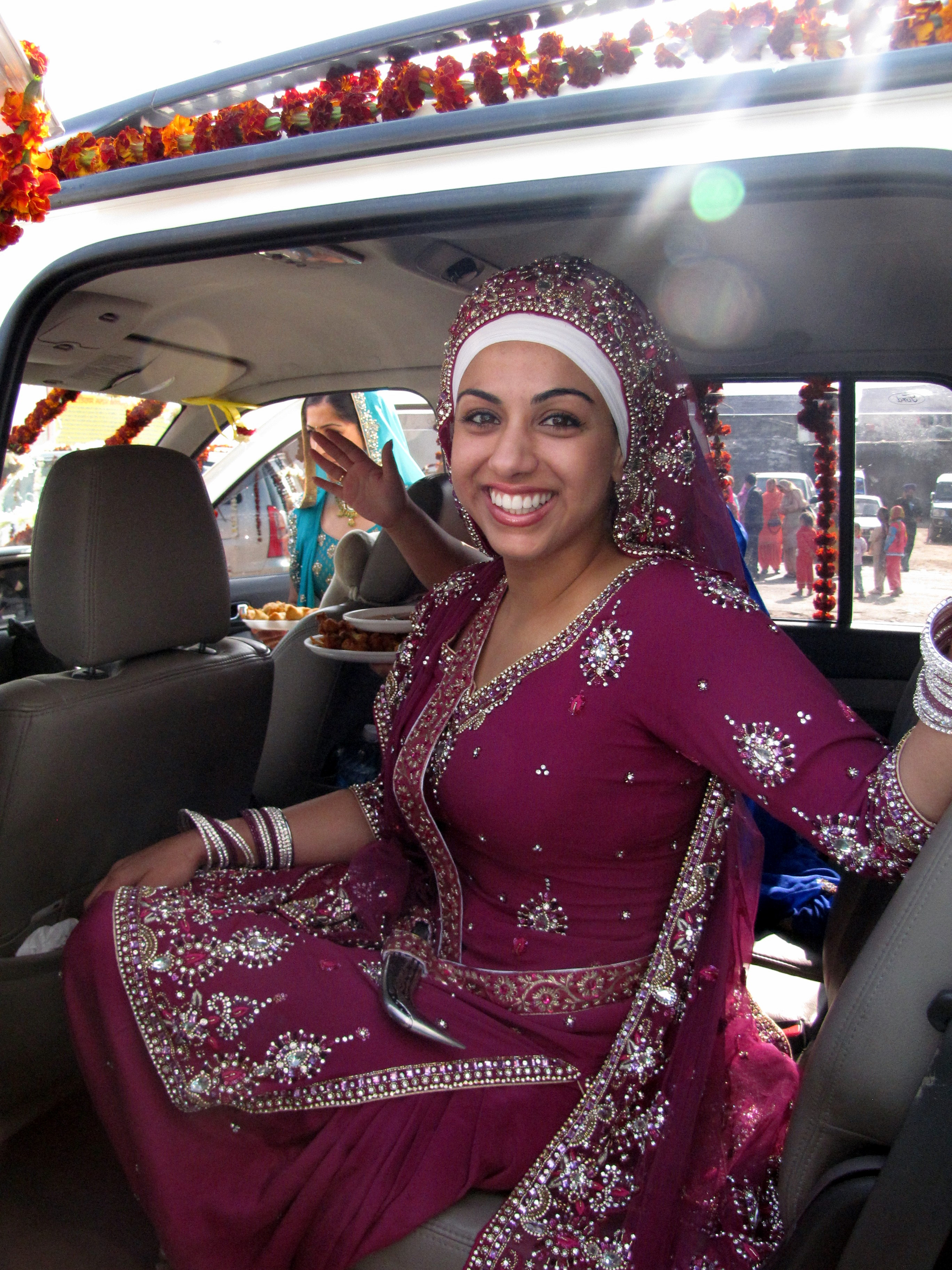
A Sikh Woman with a turban

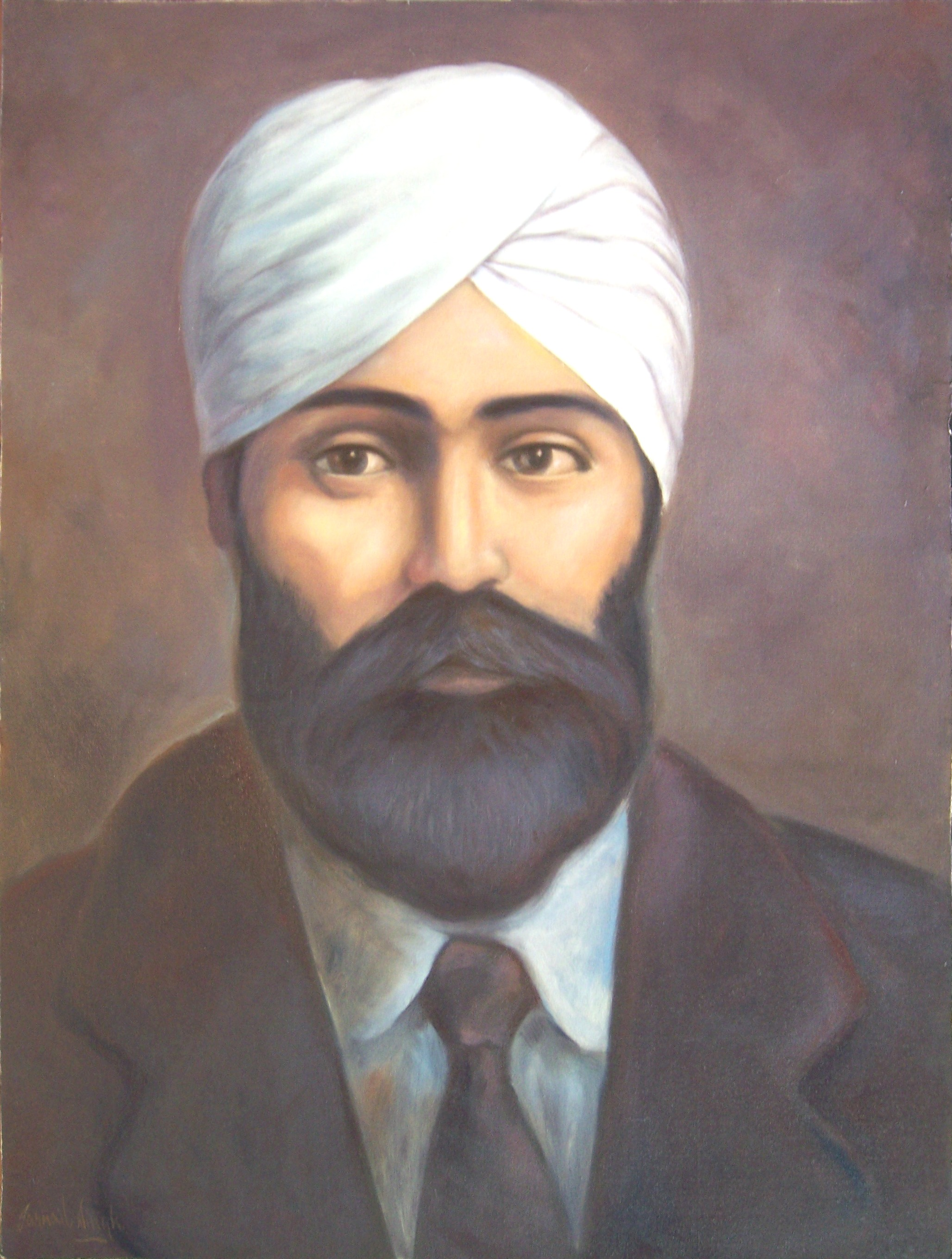
Mewa Singh, the man who spearheaded the Ghadar Movement

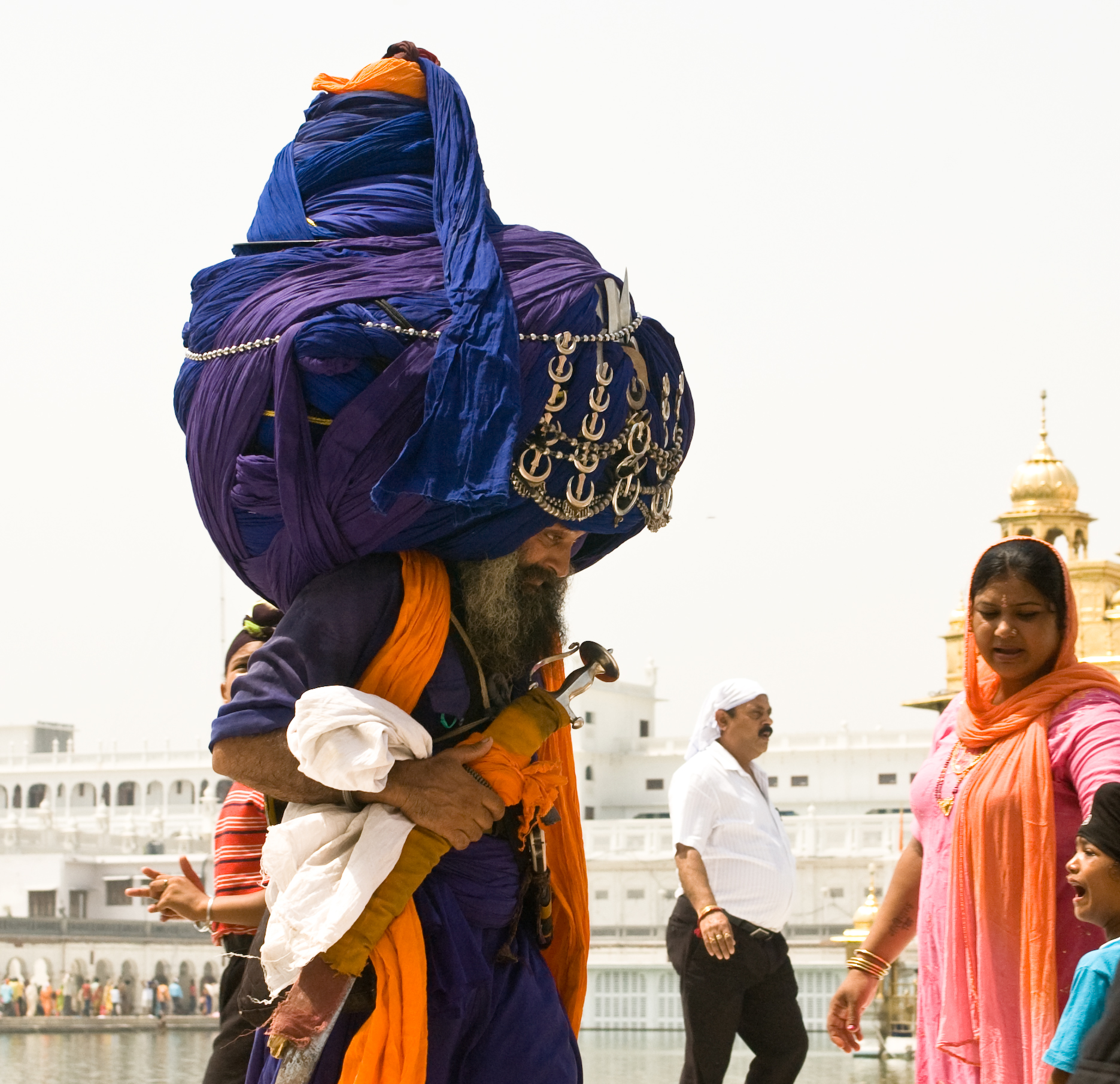
A Sikh with a darbara Singh dumala

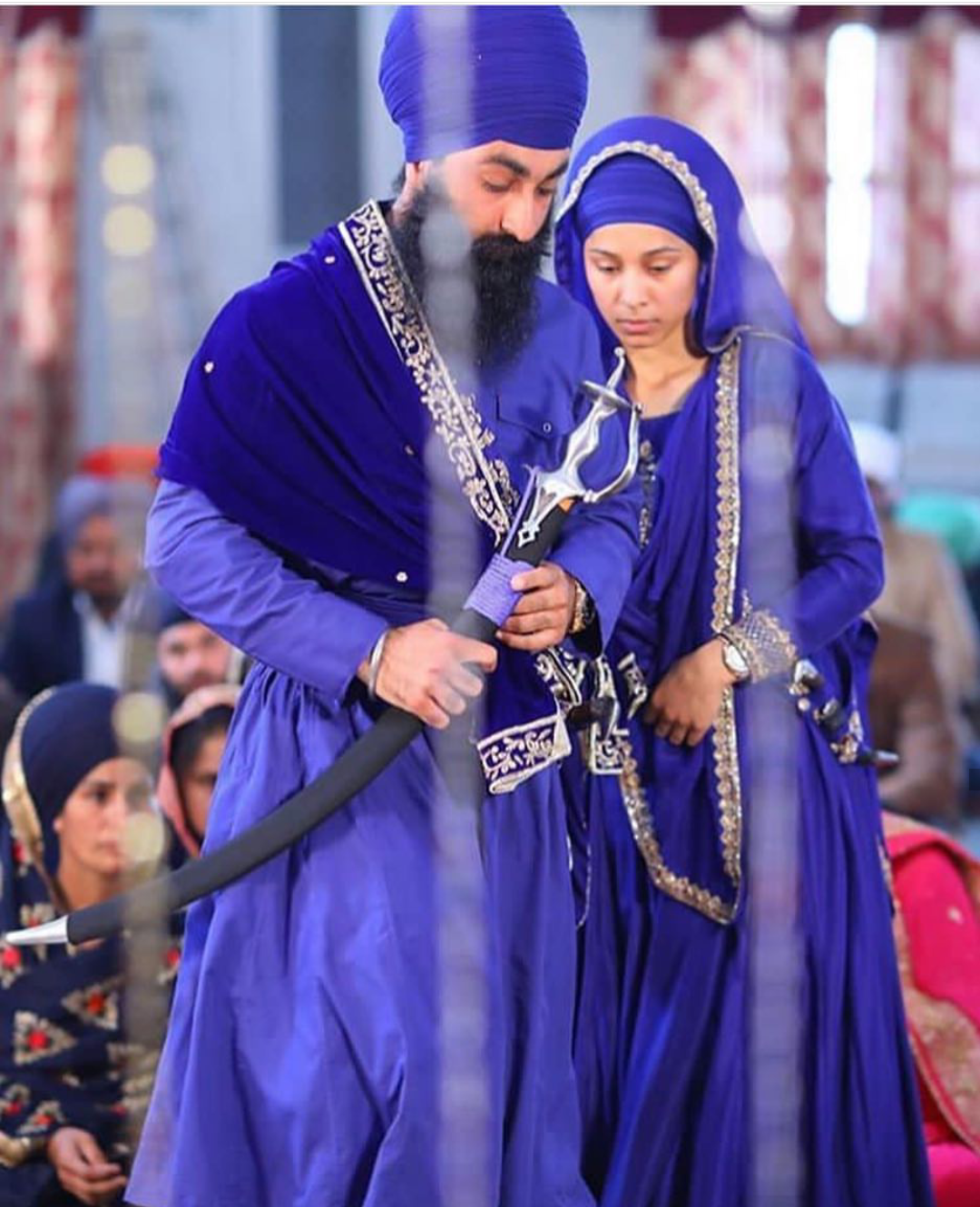
A Sikh man and woman both with turbans

=== Christianity ===
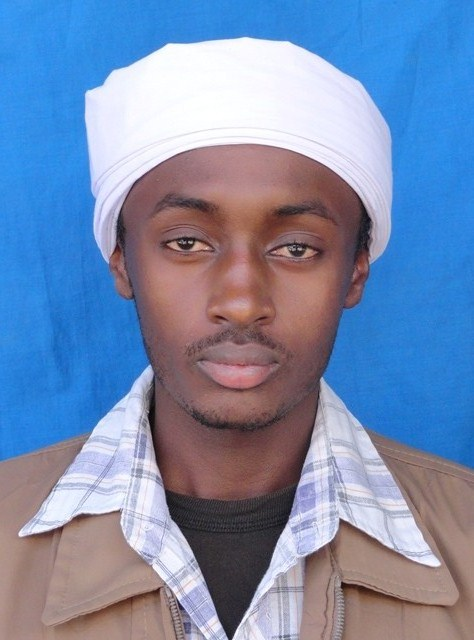
A Christian mukurinu (singular form of akurinu) on the Swahili Coast wearing a turban

In Kenya, the Akurinu, a Christian denomination, wear turbans as religious headgear. The official name of the denomination is The Kenya Foundation of the Prophets Church, or else Holy Ghost Church. Both men and women wear white turbans; children wear tunics. Some Oriental Orthodox churches, such as the Coptic Orthodox Church and the Syriac Orthodox Church, include turbans in the vestments for the priest.

The origin of the word akurinu is not clear. It is said by some to come from the Kikuyu question Mukuri-ni which translates to 'who is the redeemer?'. Others say that it comes from the growling sounds made by early adherents to the sect when possessed by the spirit, an act described as gukurina. In his book Facing Mt. Kenya, Jomo Kenyatta states that the akurinu referred to themselves as Arooti(dreamers), people of God.

The akurinu identify Joseph Ng'ang'a as the founder of the sect. It was Ng'ang'a who ascended Mount Kenya (then known as Mount Kirinyaga) with the first four akurinu prophets - Joseph Kanini, Henry Maina, Philip Mukubwa, and Lilian Njeru. It was on this ascension that the akurinu say Njeru was instructed to remove all adornments she had worn, throw them into River Nyamindi, and cover her hair. They also claim to have been instructed by God to lift their hands in the air as they pray. These two practices form an integral part of akurinu religious beliefs today.

=== Islam ===
In Islamic cultures, some men wear a turban-style headdress in emulation of Prophet Muhammad who is believed to have worn a black or white turban. It is sometimes called an Imama. The head wraps are worn in different ways and called by different names depending on the region and culture. Examples include (Arabic: عمامة `emãmah) in Arabic, and the Dastar (Persian: دستار) in Persian. The most preferred style is the elliptic cylindrical headwrap, with the tail hanging behind.

In Shi'a Islam, a black head wrap around a small white cap is worn by descendants of Muhammad called Sayyids, and white turbans by other well-educated persons and scholars. Sufi Muslims often wear a green head wrap around a small cap or the green head wrap alone. Members of the Dawat-e-Islami movement wear green turbans, whereas members of Sunni Dawate Islami (which broke away from Dawat-e-Islami in 1992) wear white turbans.

In Sudan, large white headdresses connote high social status. In India and Pakistan the cap is called a topi. Women of Islam typically do not wear turbans, as it is typically considered part of a man's dress, while women do typically cover their hair as part of hijab.

However, just as some Muslim women wear no headcovering, some modern Muslim women wear a turban style covering. Although it is still not as widely accepted by the more conservative Islamic communities.

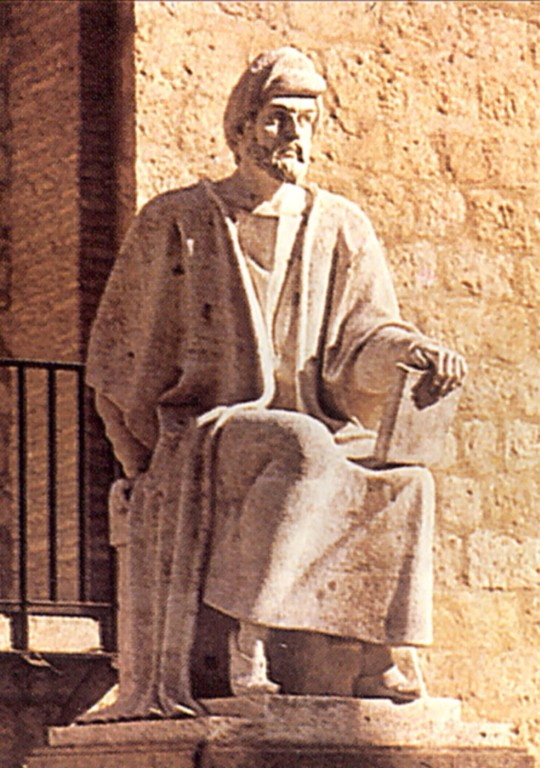
Ibn Rushd (Averroes) Muslim polymath from Spain

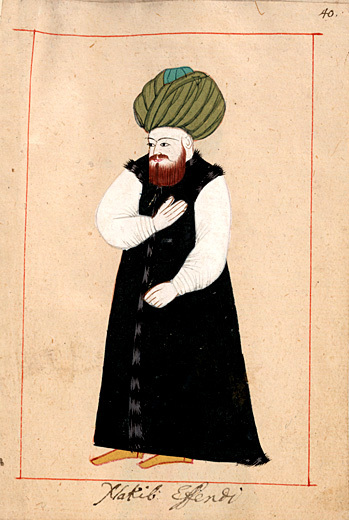
In the Ottoman Empire, Muhammad's numerous descendants formed a kind of nobility with the privilege of wearing green turbans

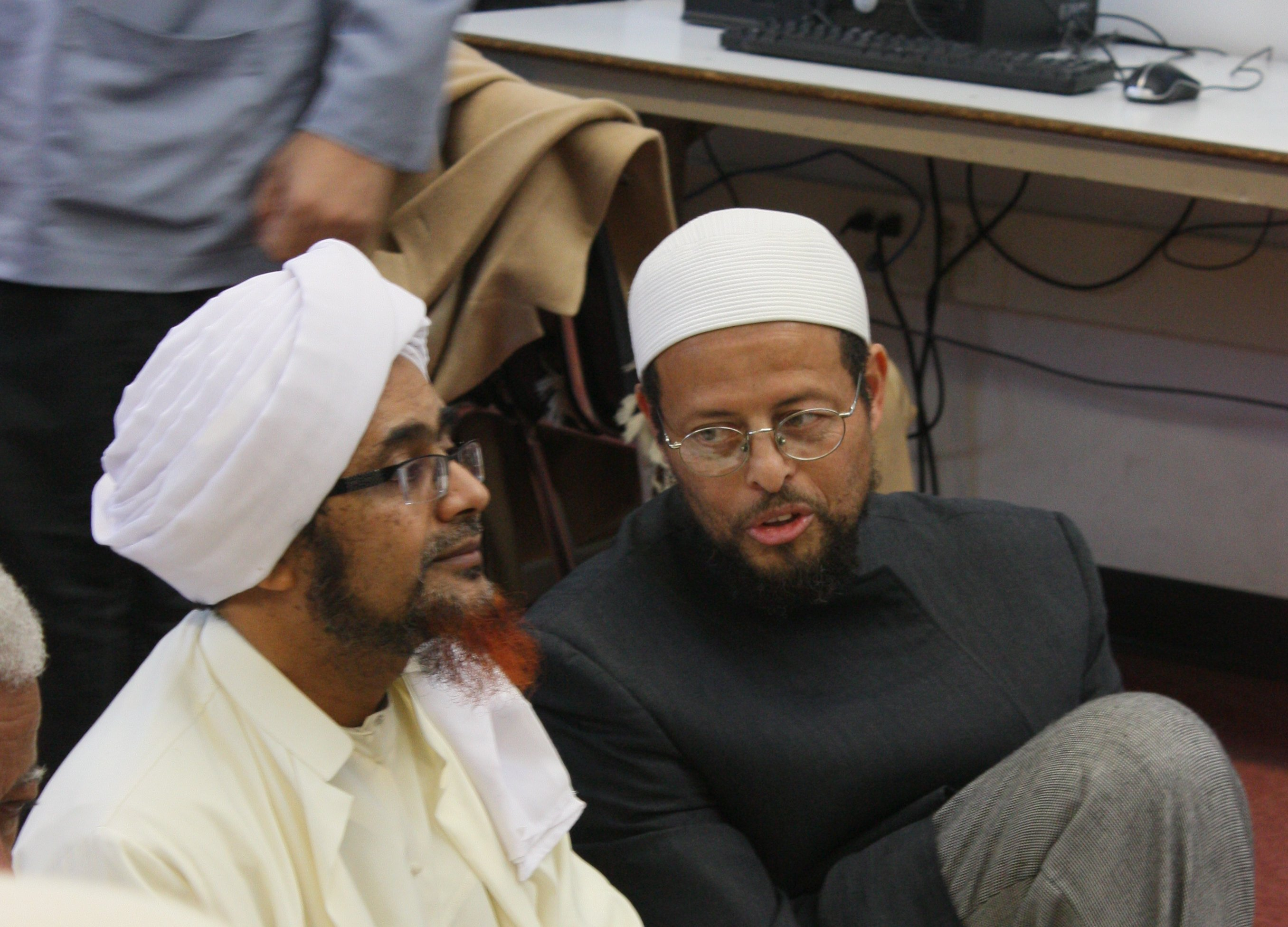
Habib Umar bin Hafiz (left) of Yemen wearing a white turban

=== Judaism ===
The traditional Jewish turban is known as a sudra. When the Jewish High Priest served in the Tabernacle and the Temple in Jerusalem, he wore a head covering called mitznefet מִצְנֶפֶת. This word has been translated as mitre (KJV) or headdress. It was most likely a turban, as the word comes from a root meaning 'to wrap'.

In the Hebrew Bible, the turban worn by the High Priest was much larger than the head coverings of the priests and wound to make a broad, flat-topped shape resembling the blossom of a flower. The head covering of the priests was different, being wound to form a cone, called a migbahat.

The priestly crown (Hebrew tzitz צִיץ "blossom", "flower") was attached to the turban by means of two sets of blue cords: one going over the top of the head and the other around the sides of the head at the level of the ears (Exodus 39:31).

According to the Talmud, the wearing of the turban atoned for the sin of haughtiness on the part of the Children of Israel (B. Zevachim 88b).

The Jews who lived under Arab rule during the Middle Ages, notably in Islamic Spain, wore turbans and headwear not too different from their Muslim counterparts.

The Sephardi Chief Rabbi of Israel, also known as Rishon LeZion customarily wears a turban (mitznefet).

Some married Jewish women wear mitpaḥats as an act of modesty.

=== Mandaeism ===
Mandaean priests wear white turbans called burzinqa.

=== Hinduism ===
In Hinduism, many peoples wear it due to culture. It is called a Pheta. It is a cultural practice driven by the harsh summer months in India especially in the state of Rajasthan. Apart from turban; there are several other headgears and also different types of turbans used in different parts of India and people wear them when going out especially in villages.

=== Rastafari ===
Members of the Bobo Ashanti mansion of the Rastafari movement keep their hair and beards, mainly with their hair in dreadlocks, and they have been wearing turbans over their dreadlocks, which are not to be removed publicly or even not at all, so as to protect and keep their dreadlocks clean. This is called a Rasta headwrap. Along with the turban, they have also been wearing robes since their founding in the 1950s, Since they are a relatively small population, it makes them more distinctive in appearance in Jamaica and elsewhere.

== See also ==
- Pagri (turban)
- Pheta
- Mysore peta
- Puneri Pagadi
- Turban knocking
- Turban training centre
