= Sri Gur Katha =

Sikh devotional epic

- Author: Bhai Jaita
- Genre: Sikhism
- Publication date: late 17th century

Sri Gur Katha (meaning "stories of the revered guru"), also spelt Sri Guru Katha, is a late 17th century Sikh text authored by Bhai Jaita that is a devotional epic. It is a hagiographical account of the life of Guru Gobind Singh written in Sant Bhasha with Old Punjabi influence. The source contains the first known accounts of the 5Ks and Amrit Sanchar, and it also contains a rehat (code of conduct).

== Description ==
The author of the text was Bhai Jaita, whose family had connections with the Sikh gurus since generations, being mostly involved in Sikh musicology. It consists of sixty eight principal stanzas (Sawwaiye, Shabad, Kabit, and Kudhliya), thirty-one couplets (Dohira, Sortha, Adil, Chaupai, Rolla), and three brief poems called Sirkhandi. The text is of the katha genre. It can be divided into six sections:

1. It begins with an invocation, which is similar to the Japji Sahib and consists of seven stanzas with aspects of Vaishnav bhakti and Nath yoga influence but focus on a Nirgun envisionment of divinity
2. Ardās, a supplication that states that the author Jiwan Singh is in the company and protection of Prabhu
3. Ustati (adoration), containing praises of the ten Sikh gurus that reiterates that the jyot (light) travelled from one body to the next
4. Chitra [Chitra Kalghiyarjika or Chitra Kalghiyar ji ka, meaning "Portrait of the One with the plume"], depiction of the tenth guru's personality and events surrounding the Khalsa, Panj Piare, Amrit Sanchar, and Rehat
5. Amrit Vidhi, covering the initiation ceremony involving amrit
6. Rahet, Sikh basic principles as per the guru

The historical events it narrates include the martyrdom of Guru Tegh Bahadur and the creation of the Khalsa Panth and Panj Piare institutions by Guru Gobind Singh at Anandpur by hosting a diwan. The text contains a tale involving the rescuing of a Brahmin's wife from a Turk by Jaita. It also touches upon the relations of Bhim Chand of Kahlur and the Sikh guru, who shifts between Paonta and Anandpur, culminating in the Battle of Bhangani.

== Manuscripts ==
Two manuscripts of the work were known:

- A manuscript originally kept by Baba Bir Singh of Muthianwala but was lost by Giani Garja Singh (who prepared a copy of it)
- the Assam Ms (36 folios, 18.1 x 11.45 cms, written in scriptio continua), in the custodianship of the family of Daya Singh Arif, who was gifted the manuscript by Assamese Sikhs in the 1950s

== Dating ==
While the work bears no internal colophon nor does it date the events it narrates, Raj Kumar Hans dates it to the early 1690s. Neeti Singh claims it was written in the 17th century in Punjab. Meanwhile, Amar Singh Panesar dates it to between 1698–1704.

== Publication and translations ==
The work was lost to mainstream Sikhs for three centuries until two manuscripts were rediscovered in the custodianship of Mazhabi Sikh families in the second half of the 20th century. A Punjabi and English translation of the original Sant Bhasha by Neeti Singh was published in 2015, improving the accessability of the document to the public.
