= Religious art =

Art with religious subjects

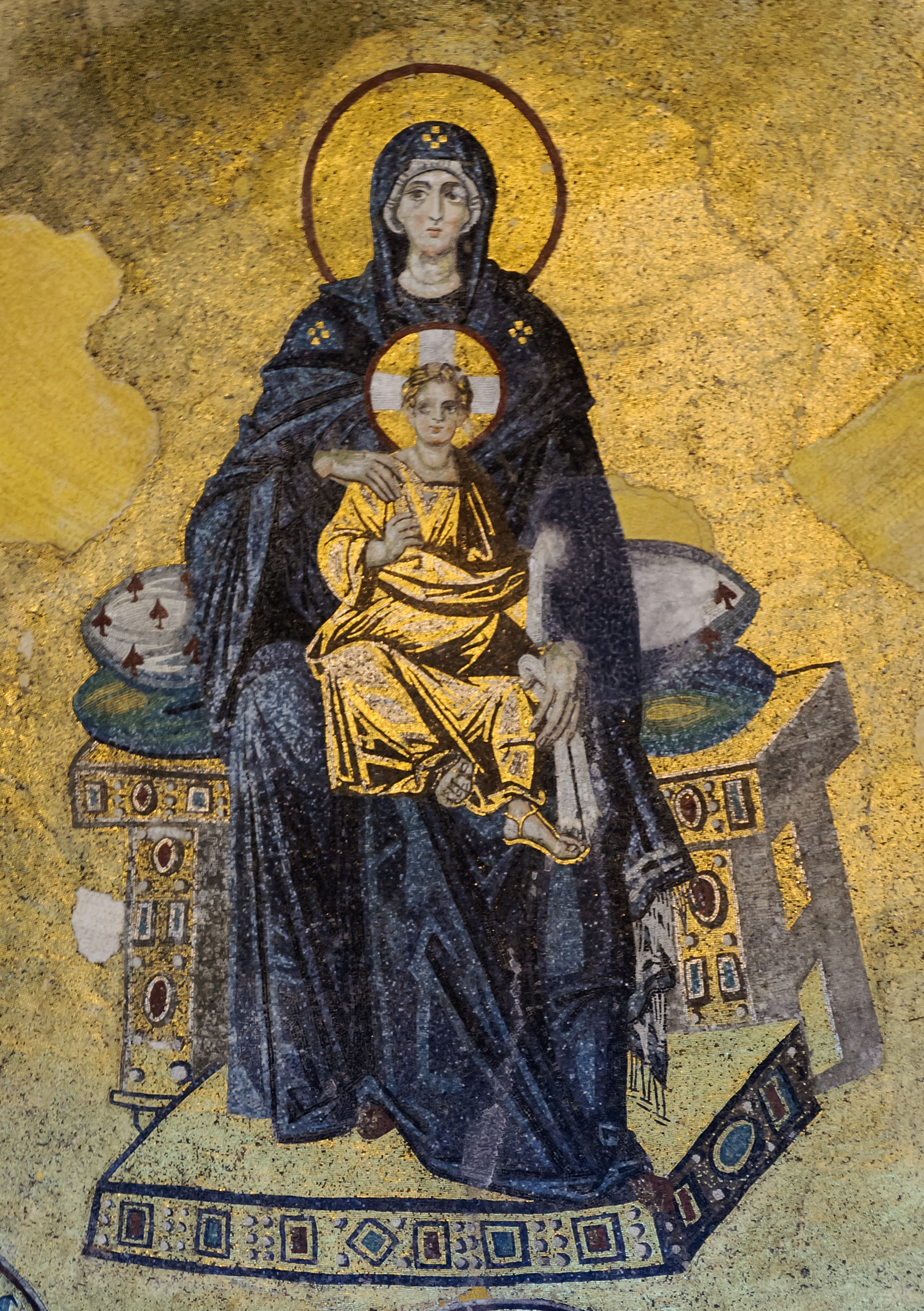
9th century Byzantine mosaic of the Hagia Sophia showing the image of the Virgin and Child, one of the first post-iconoclastic mosaics. It is set against the original golden background of the 6th century

Religious art is a visual representation of religious ideologies and their relationship with humans. Sacred art directly relates to religious art in the sense that its purpose is for worship and religious practices. According to one set of definitions, artworks that are inspired by religion but are not considered traditionally sacred remain under the umbrella term of religious art, but not sacred art.

Other terms often used for art of various religions are cult image, usually for the main image in a place of worship, icon in its more general sense (not restricted to Eastern Orthodox images), and "devotional image" usually meaning a smaller image for private prayer or worship. Images can often be divided into "iconic images", just showing one or more figures, and "narrative images" showing moments from an episode or story involving sacred figures.

The use of images has been controversial in many religions. The term for such opposition is aniconism, with iconoclasm being the deliberate destruction of images by people of the same religion.

== Buddhist art ==
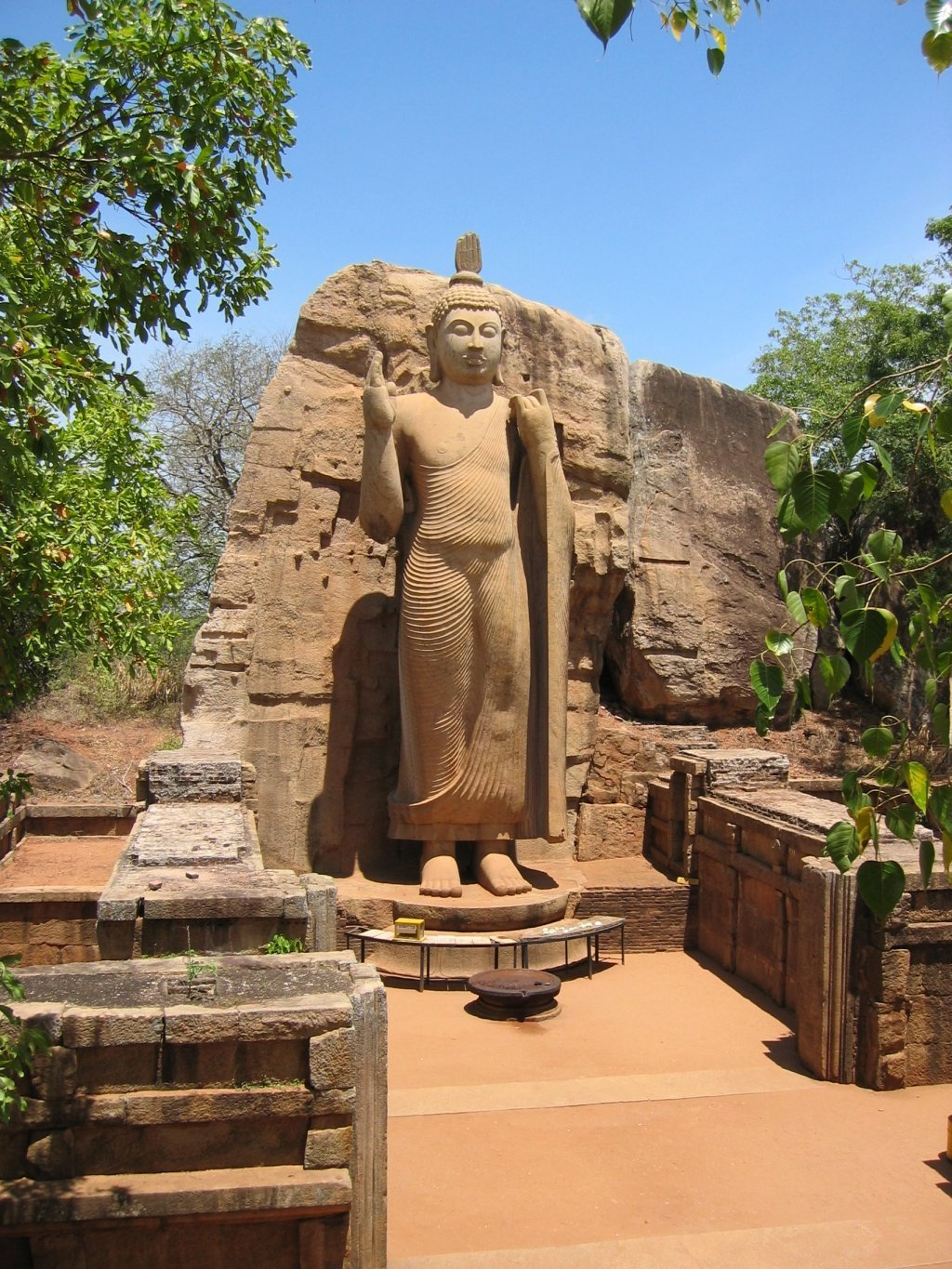
Buddha statue in Sri Lanka.

Buddhist art originated on the Indian subcontinent following the historical life of Siddhartha Gautama, 6th to 5th century BC, and thereafter evolved by contact with other cultures as it spread throughout Asia and the world.

Buddhist art followed believers as the dharma spread, adapted, and evolved in each new host country. It developed to the north through Central Asia and into Eastern Asia to form the Northern branch of Buddhist art.

Buddhist art followed to the east as far as Southeast Asia to form the Southern branch of Buddhist art.

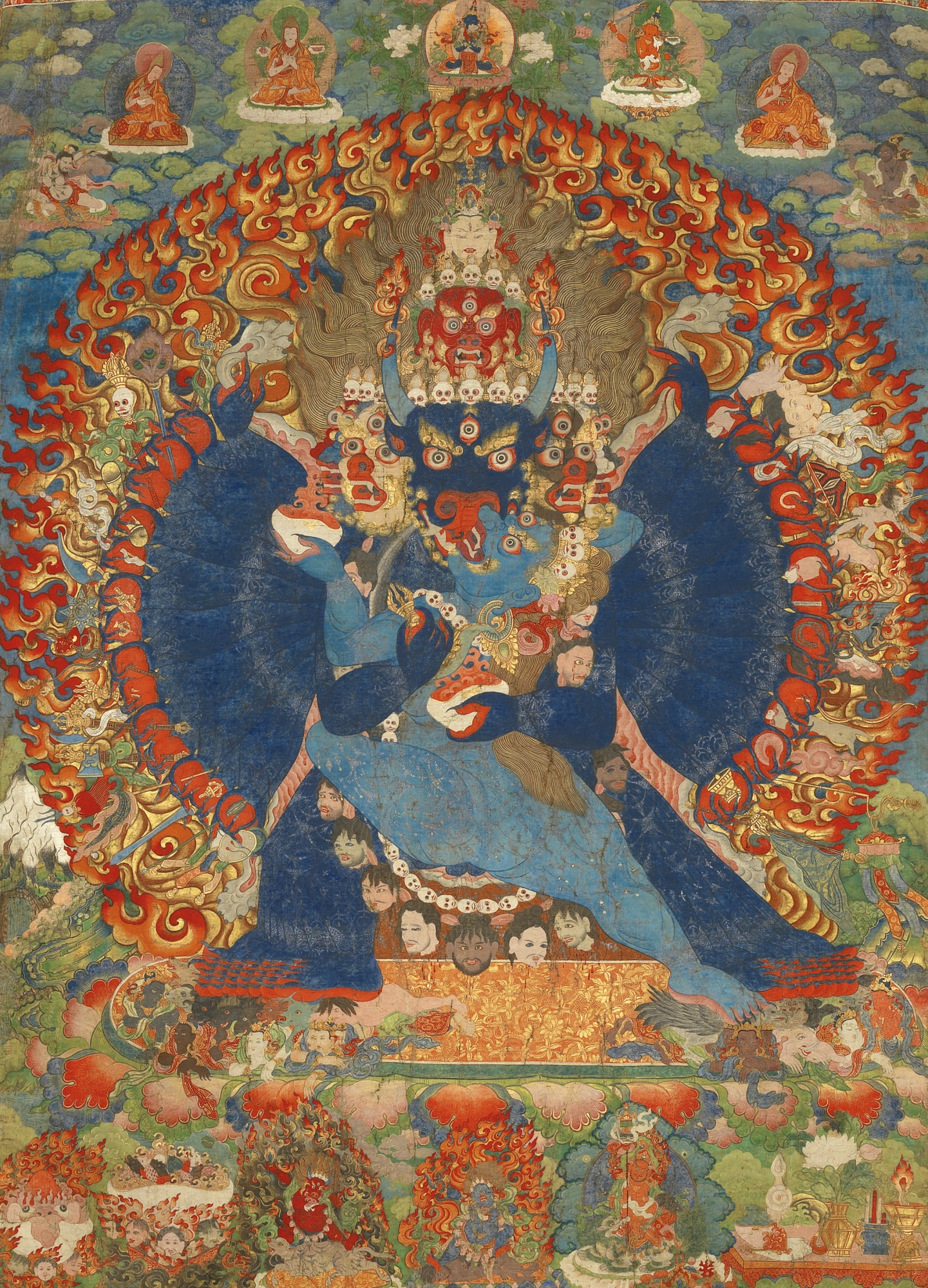
An example of Tibetan Buddhist art: Thangka Depicting Vajrabhairava, c. 1740

In India, the Buddhist art flourished and even influenced the development of Hindu art, until Buddhism nearly disappeared in India around the 10th century due in part to the vigorous expansion of Islam alongside Hinduism.

=== Tibetan Buddhist art ===
Most Tibetan Buddhist artforms are related to the practice of Vajrayana or Buddhist tantra. Tibetan art includes thangkas and mandalas, often including depictions of Buddhas and bodhisattvas. Creation of Buddhist art is usually done as a meditation as well as creating an object as aid to meditation. An example of this is the creation of a sand mandala by monks; before and after the construction prayers are recited, and the form of the mandala represents the pure surroundings (palace) of a Buddha on which is meditated to train the mind. The work is rarely, if ever, signed by the artist. Other Tibetan Buddhist art includes metal ritual objects, such as the vajra and the phurba.

=== Indian Buddhist art ===
Two places suggest more vividly than any others the vitality of Buddhist cave painting from about the 5th century AD. One is Ajanta, a site in India long forgotten until discovered in 1817. The other is Dunhuang, one of the great oasis staging posts on the Silk Road...The paintings range from calm devotional images of the Buddha to lively and crowded scenes, often featuring the seductively full-breasted and narrow-waisted women more familiar in Indian sculpture than in painting.

== Christian art ==
Christian sacred art is produced in an attempt to illustrate, supplement and portray in tangible form the principles of Christianity, though other definitions are possible. It is to make imagery of the different beliefs in the world and what it looks like. Most Christian groups use or have used art to some extent, although some have had strong objections to some forms of religious image, and there have been major periods of iconoclasm within Christianity.

Most Christian art is allusive, or built around themes familiar to the intended observer. Images of Jesus and narrative scenes from the Life of Christ are the most common subjects, especially the images of Christ on the Cross.

Scenes from the Old Testament play a part in the art of most Christian denominations. Images of the Virgin Mary, holding the infant Jesus, and images of saints are much rarer in Protestant art than that of Roman Catholicism and Eastern Orthodoxy.

For the benefit of the illiterate, an elaborate iconographic system developed to conclusively identify scenes. For example, Saint Agnes depicted with a lamb, Saint Peter with keys, Saint Patrick with a shamrock. Each saint holds or is associated with attributes and symbols in sacred art.

=== History ===
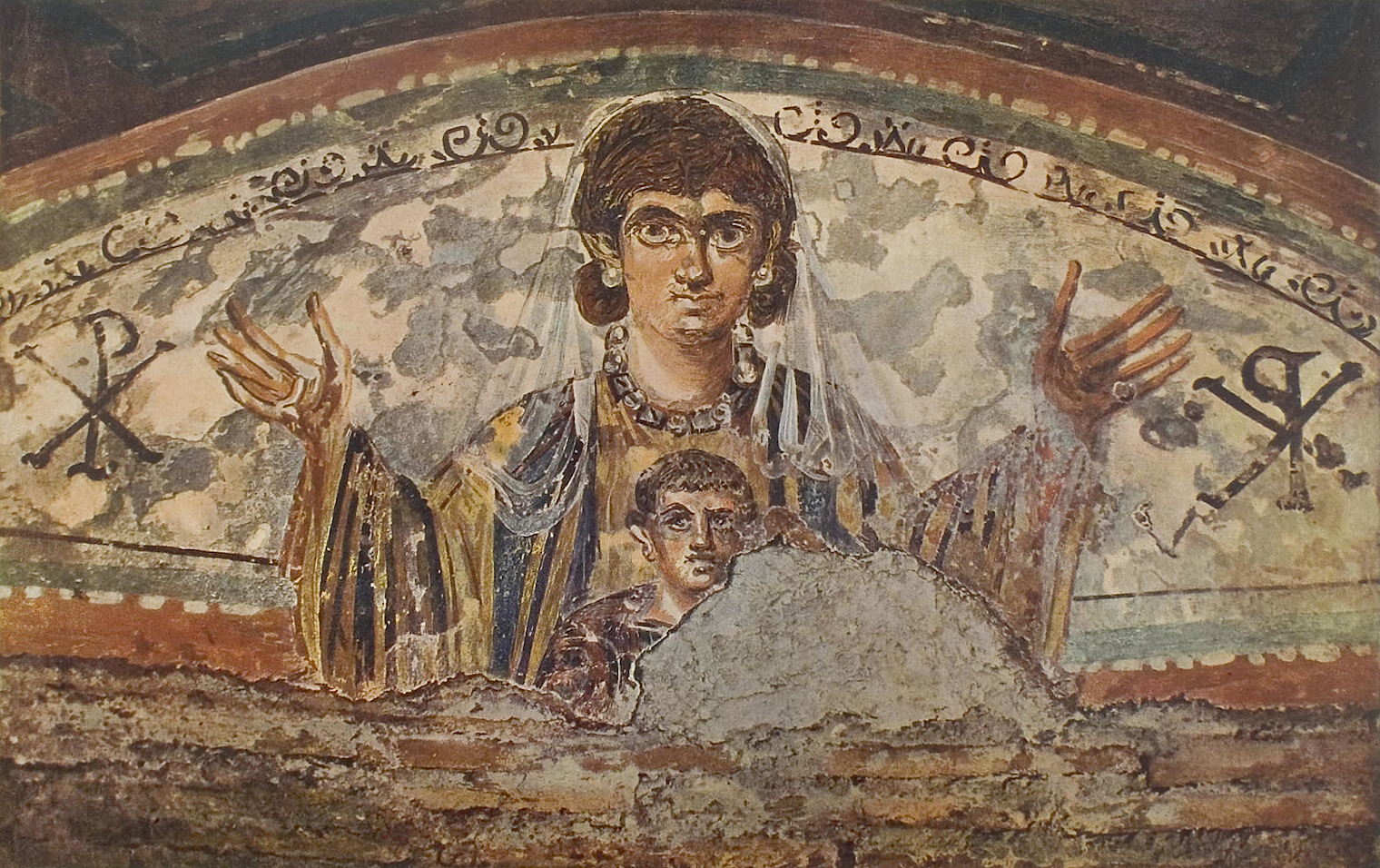
Virgin and Child. Wall painting from the early catacombs, Rome, 4th century.

Early Christian art survives from dates near the origins of Christianity. The oldest surviving Christian paintings are from the site at Megiddo, dated to around the year 70, and the oldest Christian sculptures are from sarcophagi, dating to the beginning of the 2nd century. Until the adoption of Christianity by Constantine Christian art derived its style and much of its iconography from popular Roman art, but from this point grand Christian buildings built under imperial patronage brought a need for Christian versions of Roman elite and official art, of which mosaics in churches in Rome are the most prominent surviving examples. Christian art would soon become the foundation of churches across Europe. Stained glass windows often depict biblical scenes to be reflected across the inner workings of the building. Murals and altarpiece art also fill churches with intricate and expressive Christian images.

During the development of early Christian art in the Byzantine Empire (see Byzantine art), a more abstract aesthetic replaced the naturalism previously established in Hellenistic art. This new style was hieratic, meaning its primary purpose was to convey religious meaning rather than accurately render objects and people. Realistic perspective, proportions, light and colour were ignored in favour of geometric simplification of forms, reverse perspective and standardized conventions to portray individuals and events. The controversy over the use of graven images, the interpretation of the Second Commandment, and the crisis of Byzantine Iconoclasm led to a standardization of religious imagery within the Eastern Orthodoxy.

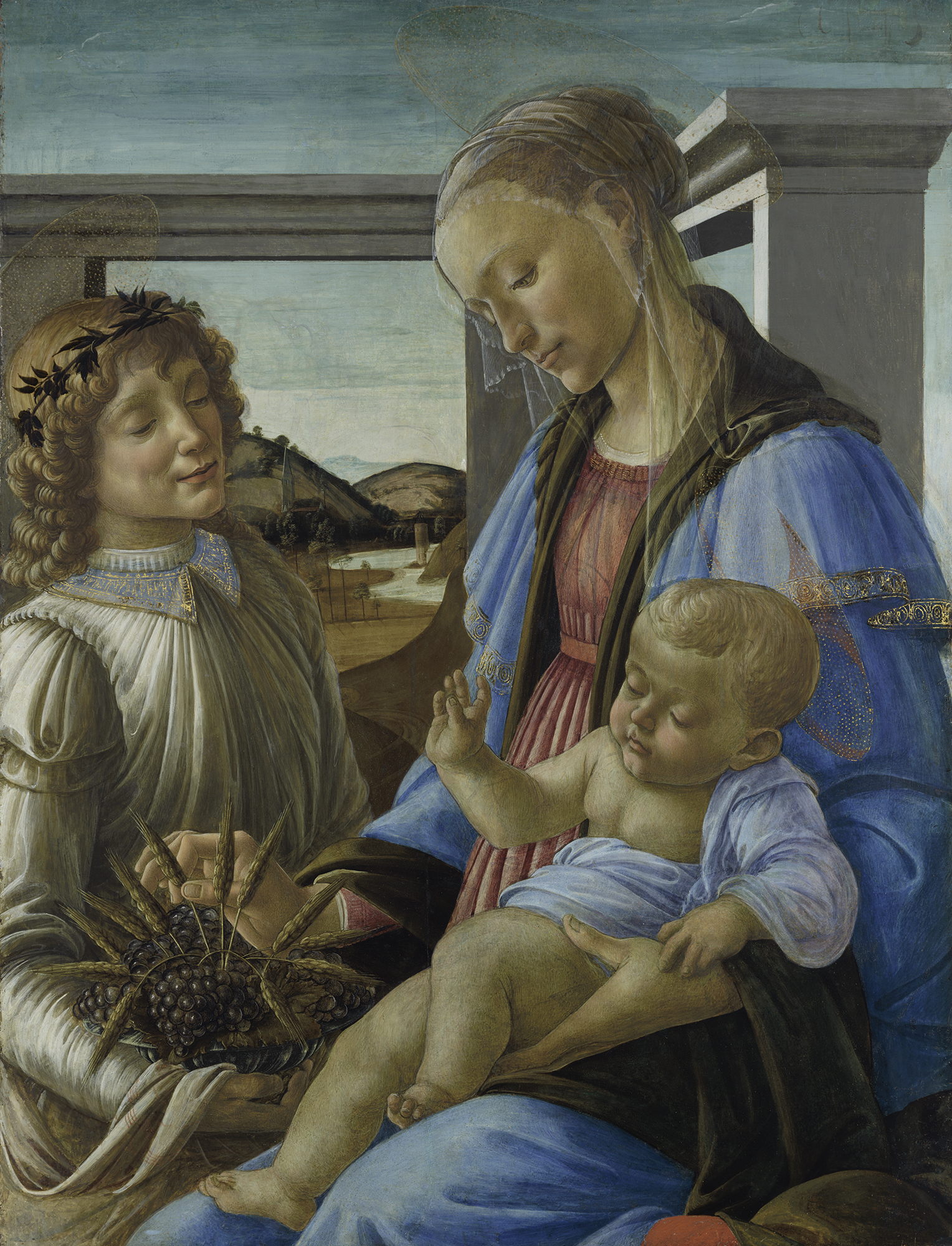
An example of a Madonna with an Angel, painted by Sandro Botticelli (1470) and commissioned by the Catholic Church during the Renaissance in Florence (Boston, Isabella Stewart Gardner Museum)

The Renaissance saw an increase in monumental secular works, but until the Protestant Reformation Christian art continued to be produced in great quantities, both for churches and clergy and for the laity. During this time, Michelangelo Buonarroti painted the Sistine Chapel and carved the famous Pietà, Gianlorenzo Bernini created the massive columns in St. Peter's Basilica, and Leonardo da Vinci painted the Last Supper. The Reformation had a huge effect on Christian art, rapidly bringing the production of public Christian art to a virtual halt in Protestant countries, and causing the destruction of most of the art that already existed.

As a secular, non-sectarian, universal notion of art arose in 19th-century Western Europe, secular artists occasionally treated Christian themes (Bouguereau, Manet). Only rarely was a Christian artist included in the historical canon (such as Rouault or Stanley Spencer). However many modern artists such as Eric Gill, Marc Chagall, Henri Matisse, Jacob Epstein, Elisabeth Frink and Graham Sutherland have produced well-known works of art for churches. Through a social interpretation of Christianity, Fritz von Uhde also revived the interest in sacred art, through the depiction of Jesus in ordinary places in life.

Since the advent of printing, the sale of reproductions of pious works has been a major element of popular Christian culture. In the 19th century, this included genre painters such as Mihály Munkácsy. The invention of color lithography led to broad circulation of holy cards. In the modern era, companies specializing in modern commercial Christian artists such as Thomas Blackshear and Thomas Kinkade, although widely regarded in the fine art world as kitsch, have been very successful.

== Confucian art ==
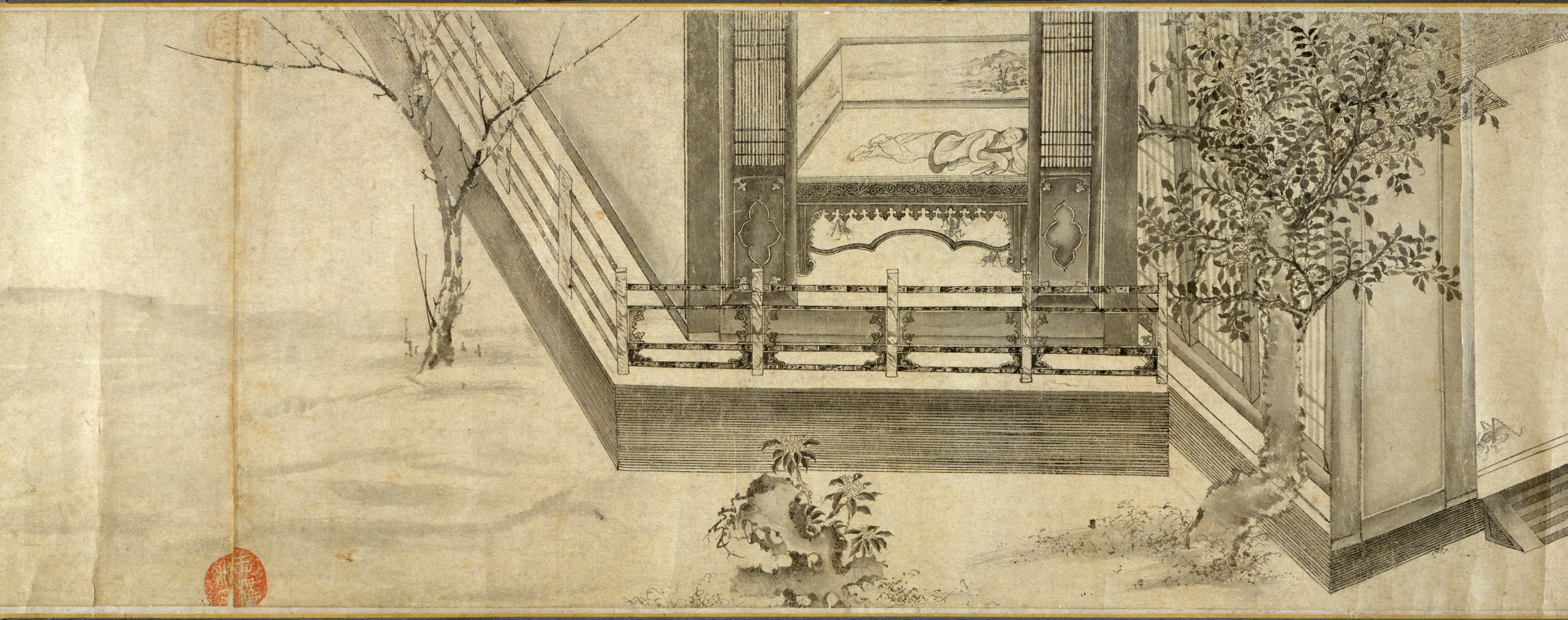
Odes of the State of Bin is a poem from The Book of Odes, a collection of poetry complied by Confucius. This image is a section of the scroll of an unidentified artist from the 13th century, and it narrates the poem about rural living.

Confucian art is inspired by Confucianism, coined after the Chinese philosopher and politician Confucius. Confucian art originated in China, then spread westwards on the Silk Road, southward down to southern China and then onto Southeast Asia, and eastwards through northern China on to Japan and Korea. While it still maintains a strong influence within Indonesia, Confucian influence on western art has been limited. While Confucian themes enjoyed representation in Chinese art centers, they are fewer in comparison to the number of artworks that are about or influenced by Daoism and Buddhism.

=== History ===
Prior to the Han dynasty, the Chinese art hierarchy considered music as the highest form of art and dismissed calligraphy, poetry, and painting as art forms and craft practiced by the lower class. Nevertheless, poetry was also popular during Confucius's time, and poetry was both praised and ranked high in status with music. According to Confucius and his disciples, music strives to create and reflect harmony in the world; hence, education should begin with the foundations of poetry and moral behavior, and conclude with music. Over time, the development of the Chinese writing system promoted the growth of calligraphy and visual arts in terms of social status. Confucian aesthetics and values further contributed to the development of these visual art forms, with landscape paintings and calligraphy works centralizing on the written works and teachings of Confucianism.

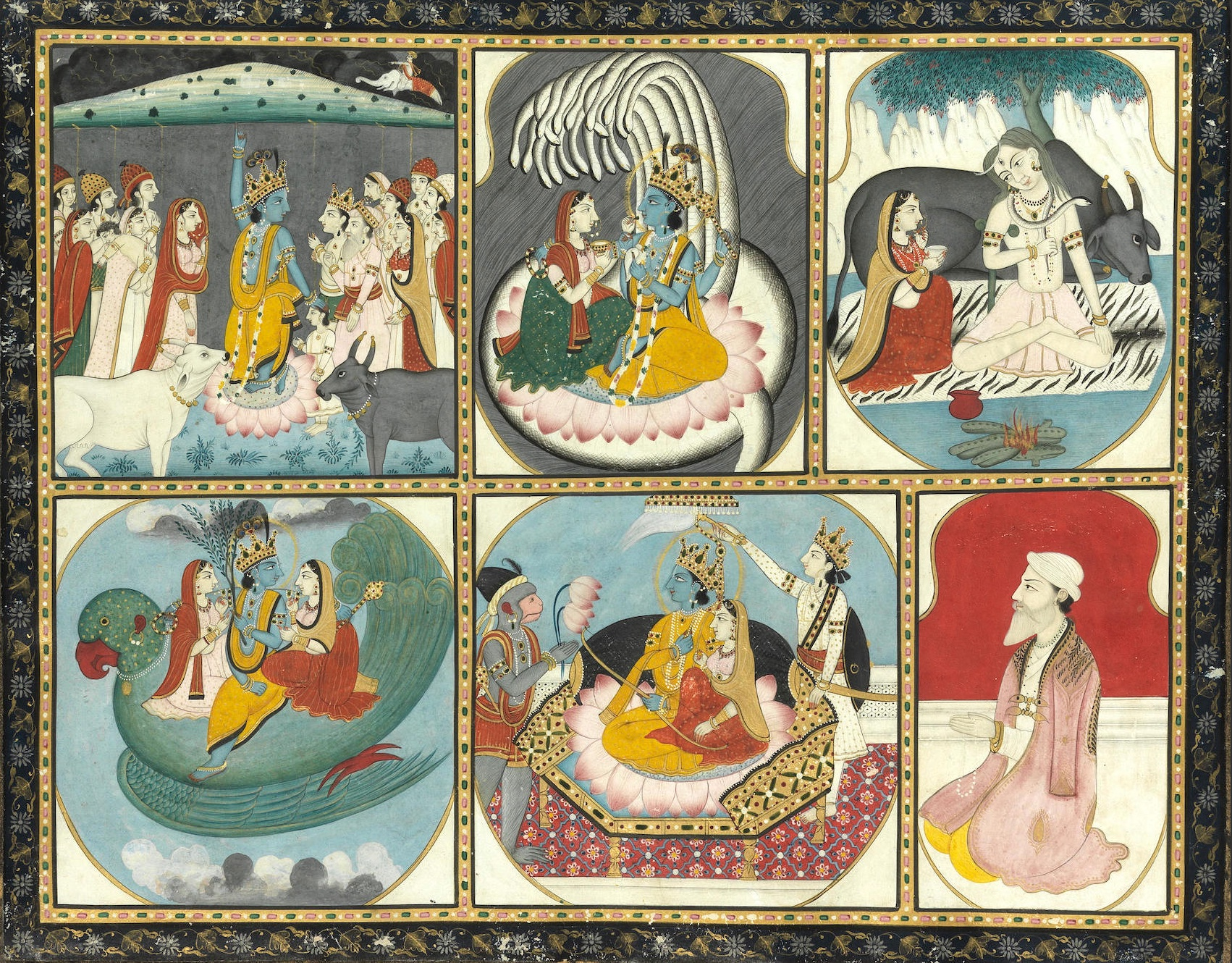
Painting of Indic deities (Krishna, Vishnu, Lakshmi, Shesha, Shiva, Parvati, Nandi, Lakshmi, Garuda, Hanuman, Rama, Sita) and a devotee (possibly Diwan Dina Nath), Mandi, ca.1830

== Hindu art ==
Hinduism, with its 1.2 billion followers, makes up about 15% of the world's population and as such Hindu art is incredibly varied. There are 64 traditional arts, which include music styles, jewelry, and painting. Hindu symbols such as the gods and their reincarnations, the lotus flower, extra limbs, and even the traditional arts make their appearances in many secular sculptures, paintings, music, and dance. Some symbols, such as the lotus, are also found in other Indian religions such as Sikhism and Jainism. In Hindu art, the god Vishnu is portrayed with a conch, a lotus, a mace, and a wheel.

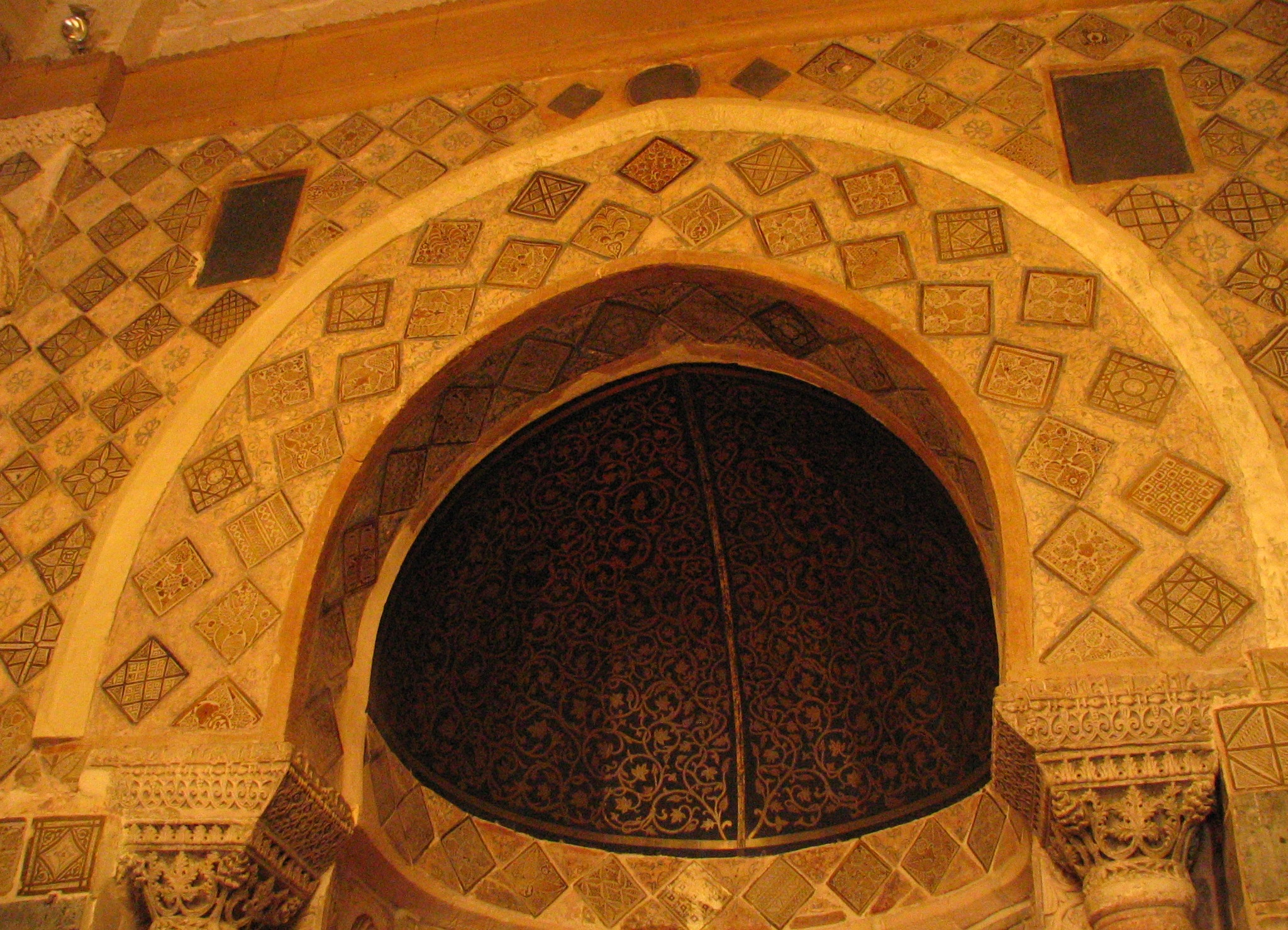
A specimen of Islamic sacred art: in the Great Mosque of Kairouan in Tunisia, the upper part of the mihrab (prayer niche) is decorated with 9th-century lusterware tiles and painted intertwined vegetal motifs.

== Islamic art ==
A prohibition against depicting representational images in religious art, as well as the naturally decorative nature of Arabic script, led to the use of calligraphic decorations, which usually involved repeating geometrical patterns and vegetal forms (arabesques) that expressed ideals of order and nature. These were used on religious architecture, carpets, and handwritten documents. Islamic art has reflected this balanced, harmonious world-view. It focuses on spiritual essence rather than physical form.

While there has been an aversion to potential idol worship through Islamic history, this is a distinctly modern Sunni view. Persian miniatures, along with medieval depictions of Muhammad and angels in Islam, stand as prominent examples contrary to the modern Sunni tradition. Also, Shi'a Muslims are much less averse to the depiction of figures, including the Prophet's as long as the depiction is respectful.

=== Figure representation ===
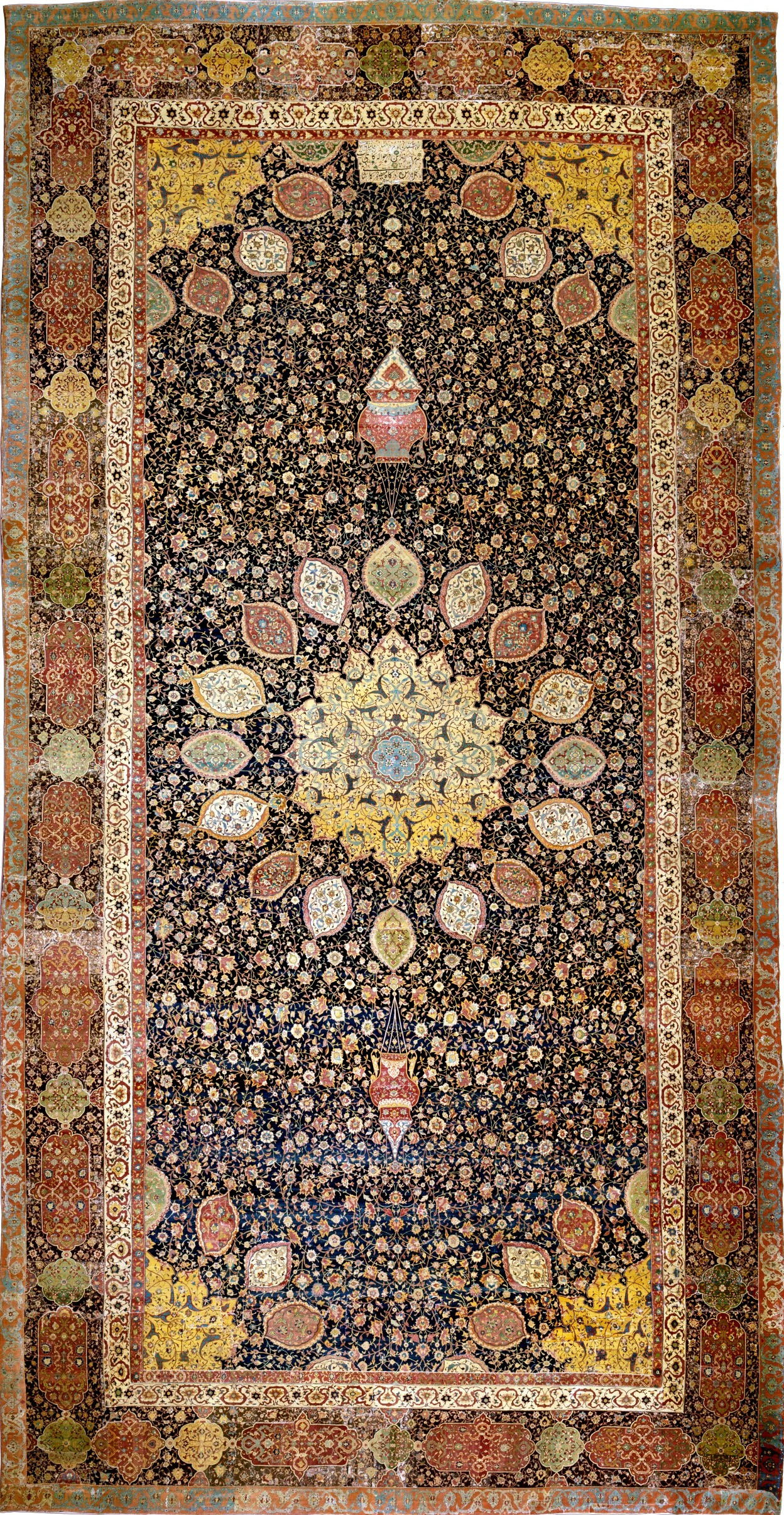
The Ardabil Carpet, a Persian carpet, Tabriz, mid-16th century, depicts floral gardens shaped in a manner that reflects the Islamic symbolism of paradise.

The Islamic resistance to the representation of living beings ultimately stems from the belief that the creation of living forms is unique to God. It is for this reason that the role of images and image makers has been controversial.

The strongest statements on the subject of figural depiction are made in the Hadith (Traditions of the Prophet), where painters are challenged to "breathe life" into their creations and threatened with punishment on the Day of Judgment.

The Qur'an is less specific but condemns idolatry and uses the Arabic term musawwir ("maker of forms", or artist) as an epithet for God. Partially as a result of this religious sentiment, figures in painting were often stylized and, in some cases, the destruction of figurative artworks occurred. Iconoclasm was previously known in the Byzantine period and aniconicism was a feature of the Judaic world, thus placing the Islamic objection to figurative representations within a larger context. As ornament, however, figures were largely devoid of any larger significance and perhaps therefore posed less challenge. As with other forms of Islamic ornamentation, artists freely adapted and stylized basic human and animal forms, giving rise to a great variety of figural-based designs.

=== Arabesque ===
Arabesque is a decorative art style characterized by repetitive, intricate patterns of intertwined plants and abstract curvilinear motifs. It is believed to have originated in the Islamic world, and its use spread throughout the Middle East, Europe, and North Africa. It has played an important role in Islamic art, often serving as a form of religious expression. The term "arabesque" is a French term derived from the Italian word arabesco, meaning "in the Arabic style" Arabesque patterns can be found in various media, including ceramics, architecture, calligraphy, and textiles. Since the 19th century, Arabesque art has been highly influential in Western art and design, with many designers and artists incorporating patterns into their work.

=== Calligraphy ===
Calligraphy is a highly regarded element of Islamic art. The Qur'an was transmitted in Arabic, and inherent within the Arabic script is the potential for ornamental forms. The employment of calligraphy as ornament had a definite aesthetic appeal but often also included an underlying talismanic component. While most works of art had legible inscriptions, not all Muslims would have been able to read them. One should always keep in mind, however, that calligraphy is principally a means to transmit a text, albeit in a decorative form. From its simple and primitive early examples of the 5th and 6th century AD, the Arabic alphabet developed rapidly after the rise of Islam in the 7th century into a beautiful form of art. The main two families of calligraphic styles were the dry styles, called generally the Kufic, and the soft cursive styles, which include Naskhi, Thuluth, Nastaliq and many others.

=== Geometry ===
Geometric patterns make up one of the three non-figural types of decoration in Islamic art. Whether isolated or used in combination with non-figural ornamentation or figural representation, geometric patterns are popularly associated with Islamic art, largely due to their aniconic quality. These abstract designs not only adorn the surfaces of monumental Islamic architecture but also function as the major decorative element on a vast array of objects of all types.

Types Of Geometric Styles

Geometric patterns are frequently associated with Islamic art, partly because of their iconic appeal, whether used alone or in conjunction with figural depiction or non-configurable adornment. These abstract patterns are used as the primary ornamental feature on various items of all kinds, in addition to adorning the surfaces of massive Islamic buildings. Although geometric ornamentation may have peaked in the Islamic world, the Greeks, Romans and Sasanians in Iran were the sources for geometric shapes and elaborate patterns. Islamic artists incorporated significant components of the classical past to invent a new form of decoration that highlighted the vitality of order and unity. Islamic astronomers, mathematicians and scientists contributed these forms, which were crucial for their type of art style.

History And Design

Geometric shapes resemble the arabesque design found in many vegetal designs in terms of its abstraction, repeated motifs and symmetry. Geometric designs frequently coexist with calligraphic decoration. Circles and interlaced circles, squares or four-sided polygons are the typical star pattern resulting from squares and triangles inscribed in a circle. Multi-sided polygons are the four fundamental shapes or “repeat units” from which the more complex patterns are built. It is evident, however, that the intricate designs found on several things come in various sizes and configurations, making them suitable for inclusion more than category.

The geometric shape of the circle is used in Islamic art to signify the fundamental symbol of oneness and the ultimate course of all diversity in creation. As the illustration below shows, many classic Islamic patterns have ritual beginnings in the circle's raw partition into regular sections.

Four circle divisions resulted in the above pattern, created in Yazd, Iran, in the fifteenth century. From there, a regular grid of triangles is created, and then the design is added on top of it. See how the intricate pattern intertwines with the fundamental design, shown in the images above as a white outline.

Alhambra Palace Geometry

Geometric patterns, biomorphic design (arabesque) and calligraphy are expertly combined in the Alhambra in Spain from the 14th century. Islamic art is made up of these three separate but complementary fields. They are arranged in a three-tiered hierarchy, with geometry at the button. This is frequently indicated by its use on the lower portions of walls or floors, as in the example above.

The decorative features used use a variety of symmetries that are now recognized as belonging to separate mathematical groups, yet the patterns’ delicacy and elegance are unmatched in contemporary mathematical thought. Although it was once customary in Islam to use geometric shapes, these designs are works of architecture. Since the eighth century, Muslim calligraphers and geometric pattern designers have decorated mosques, castles and manuscripts. Most often, Islamic geometric designs are employed in places of worship as a way to exalt God. Grand structures made by divine geometry include buildings, gardens and floors.

The Blue Mosque Geometry

There are observable patterns spanning a thousand years of Islamic history and throughout the entire Islamic world since these geometric patterns are also connected to Islamic culture. In some pieces of architecture, Islamic architects follow the same guidelines, such as in the Blue Mosque and the Alhambra in Granada pictured above. The Alhambra palace in Spain and the Samarkand mosque in Uzbekistan are just two examples of the art of repeated geometric designs that can be seen worldwide.

== Jain art ==
Jain art refers to religious works of art associated with Jainism. Even though Jainism spread only in some parts of India, it has made a significant contribution to Indian art and architecture.

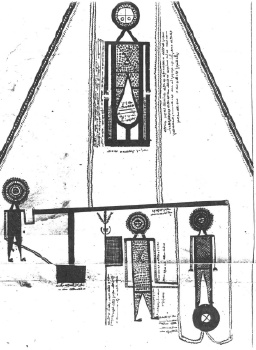
Mandaean manuscript art featuring Abatur at the scales, from the Scroll of Abatur

== Mandaean art ==
Mandaean art can be found in illustrated manuscript scrolls called diwan. Mandaean scroll illustrations, usually labeled with lengthy written explanations, typically contain abstract geometric drawings of uthras that are reminiscent of cubism or prehistoric rock art.

== Sikh art ==
The art, culture, identity, and societies of the Sikhs has been merged with different locality and ethnicity of different Sikhs into categories such as 'Agrahari Sikhs', 'Dakhni Sikhs' and 'Assamese Sikhs'; however there has emerged a niche cultural phenomenon that can be described as 'Political Sikh'. The art of diaspora Sikhs such as Amarjeet Kaur Nandhra, and Amrit and Rabindra Kaur Singh (The Singh Twins), is partly informed by their Sikh spirituality and influence.

=== Images of the Sikh Gurus ===
Sikhism was founded in the 16th century by Guru Nanak, who was first painted more than 200 years after he lived. The widely popular portraits of the ten Sikh gurus only appeared in the first half of the 18th century. One of the first set of paintings of the Gurus were commissioned by Baba Ram Rai, the eldest son of the seventh Sikh guru, Guru Har Rai.

Most of the early portraits of the Sikh Gurus were painted in courtly Mughal style. Under the Mughal empire, Punjabi artists at the time became trained in the Mughal style of painting, resulting in their work being highly influenced by the Mughal style of art. The early portraits of the Sikh Gurus and the elements in them, like their outfits, turbans, and poses, looked similar to Mughal nobles and princes. The Gurus are identified in Devanagari, Gurmukhi, and Persian scripts, also composed in the Mughal style. In a painting from around 1750, the sixth Sikh guru is depicted in courtly Mughal dress and setting.

One of the first images of Guru Nanak depicts him as a pious, religious man with simple clothes and a rosary held in his hand, portraying his contemplative nature. The earlier of the ten Gurus have their images modeled on Guru Nanak's piety and simplicity. A transformation can be noticed with the sixth Guru when elements of political resistance and power are added, showing Sikh political struggles at the time. Further, with Guru Gobind Singh, elements of grandeur were added, such as royal attire, precious jewels, elegant shoes, a grand turban, and a warrior-like sword.

The Gurus are also extensively depicted in the Janamsakhis (hagiographies of the Guru). There are many paintings and depictions of Guru Nanak's life, specifically in the B-40 Janamsakhi. He is shown growing up from a little boy to a teenager to a youth, and then into a middle-aged man and eventually an old, wise man. The images also depict many core Sikh values along with the Political and Cultural forces that influenced his life and religion.

=== Sikh Art and Architecture during Maharaja Ranjit Singh's Reign ===
Maharaja Ranjit Singh's reign (1801–1839) holds prime importance in Sikh history. He was a great patron of art and architecture and sponsored the construction of many magnificent forts, palaces, temples, gurdwaras, precious jewels, clothes, colorful paintings, minting of coins and luxury tents and canopies. The most significant of these were the golden throne built by Hafez Muhammad Multani and the bejewelled canopy for the Guru Granth Sahib.

Ranjit Singh's most remarkable contribution was the refurbishment of the Harmandir Sahib. He invited skilled architects, artists, wood carvers and other craftsmen to Amritsar for the renovation. He also hired a technical expert for the gold plating of the Harmandir Sahib. The Harmandir Sahib is now embellished with semi-precious stones like lapis lazulli and onyx along with its marble walls on the exterior. The walls also boast Arabesque and kaleidoscopic designs. The interior is lined with mirrors and colorful glass and its upper part is covered with gilded copper plates. Besides the Harmandir Sahib, Ranjit Singh also contributed to the embellishments many other gurdwaras, drawing spectacular imagery from the Guru Granth Sahib, the lives of the Gurus and the Janamsakhis. He also contributed to temples and mosques, with one of the most significant ones being expensive silver doors at a Hindu temple of Goddess Kali. Under Maharaja Ranjit Singh, cities like Lahore, Amritsar, Multan, Sialkot, Srinagar and Patiala thrived as centres of the arts.

== Taoist art ==
Taoist art (also spelled as Daoist art) relates to the Taoist philosophy and narratives of Lao-tzu (also spelled as Laozi) that promote "living simply and honestly and in harmony with nature."

== Religious Symbolism and Iconography ==
Across many religions, symbols or icons are used to represent specific beliefs. These small pieces of art are summaries of religion which can and have been used by many to imply what their beliefs are. For example, Christianity being symbolized by the cross icon and Islam being symbolized by the image of the star and crescent. Also see: Religious symbols.

== See also ==
- Religious image
- Spiritualist art
