= Kesh (Sikhism) =

Ritual haircare practice

In Sikhism, kesh or kes (Gurmukhi: ਕੇਸ) is the practice of allowing one's hair (usually only referring to the hair on one's head, beard and mustache) to grow naturally without removing it. The practice is one of The Five Kakaars, the outward symbols ordered by Guru Gobind Singh in 1699 as a means to profess the Sikh faith. The hair is combed twice daily with a kanga, another of the five Ks, and tied into a simple knot known as a joora or rishi knot. This knot of hair is usually held in place with the kanga and covered by a turban.

The 52 commands of Guru Gobind Singh written at Hazur Sahib at Nanded, in the state of Maharashtra, mention that the kesh (hair) should be revered as the form of the Satguru (eternal guru) whom they consider the same as god. For this reason the kesh is kept with the utmost respect. This includes regular maintenance of hair which includes but is not limited to combing at least twice daily, washing regularly and not allowing for public touching.

== Etymology ==
In Sanskrit, kesh comes from k, meaning head, and esh, meaning master/supreme, meaning the pinnacle or supreme portion of the head. This matches with Santokh Singh's Suraj Prakash which states,

ਰਚ੍ਯੋ ਸੁ ਈਸ਼ੁਰ ਮਾਨੁਖ ਦੇਹ ॥ ਕਰ੍ਯੋ ਸੁਭਾਇਮਾਨ ਛਬਿ ਗ੍ਰੇਹ ॥
The body is created by Eshvar [The Lord], He has created humans beautiful and respectful.

ਉੱਤਮਾਂਗ ਪਰ ਸੁੰਦਰ ਕਰੇ ॥ ਅਧਿਕ ਰੂਪ ਕੇਸ਼ਨ ਤੇ ਧਰੇ ॥40॥

Out of all parts of the body, the head is the highest, and adorning Kesh [unshorn hair] on top of one's head the body becomes beautiful.

The Mahan Kosh also states, kesh is "the hair on the head". Avatar Singh Vahiria's Khalsa Dharam Shastar (1914), agrees with this stating, "Kesh means the hair on the head and also the beard and mustache."

== Significance ==
Kesh is a religious symbol that can be, and has been, interpreted by Sikhs and others in a variety of different ways. For many Sikhs, Kesh is a symbol of devotion to God, reminding Sikhs that they should obey the will of God. By not cutting it, Sikhs honour God's gift of hair. Kesh combined with the combing of hair using a kangha shows respect for God and all of his gifts.

Bhai Nand Lal, who was a poet in the court of the 10th Guru, Guru Gobind Singh, wrote in Persian:

Nishān-e-Sikhī ast īn Panj harf-e kāf,

Hargiz na bāshad azīn panj muāf,

Kara, Karad, Kacha, Kanga bidān,

Bina kesh hēch ast jumla nishān.

[These five letters of K are emblems of Sikhism.

These five are most incumbent;

Steel bangle, big knife, shorts and a comb;

Without unshorn hair the other four are of no significance.]

The above composition is found in some early Dasam Granth manuscripts.

Bhai Desa Singh, a Sikh from the mid 18th century, writes that:

Just like a bird without wings, or like a sheep without wool
Or like a woman without clothes, such is a man without kesh.

When a man adorns Kesh only then does he have full form.

Desa Singh instructs in his Code of Conduct, Rehatnama, text that Singh should wash their Kesh with yogurt every two weeks and then cleanse and infuse it with perfume.

Bhai Daya Singh Rehatnama states that the Kesh as a symbol was given to the Khalsa by Durga at the 1699 Amrit Sanskar, implying the adorning of the kesh as her symbol.

Kesh was such an important symbol of identity that during the persecution of Sikhs under the Mughal Empire, followers were willing to face death rather than shave or cut their hair to disguise themselves. The symbol of long hair for Sikhs was the stamp or insignia of the Guru.

Historian J.P. Singh Uberoi argues that the taboo against cutting hair arose in the context of the religious pluralism in Northwest India at the time of Guru Gobind Singh, when the newly emergent Sikh community defined itself against ascetic renouncers like yogis and sannyasins, who shaved their hair completely or let it grow but into matted dreadlocks. Contrary to these groups, the affirmatively householder Sikhs let their hair grow as a kind of "negation of the negation" but did so in an orderly way by combing it with the kangha (comb), one of the other five Ks.

== Stages ==
Within Sikhism, a Sikh male child's uncut hair remains plaited until around the age of 5, when it is tied in a knot and covered in a cloth (such as a rumal or patka). Eventually to mark the succession into symbolic adulthood, the dastar bandi is performed when a boy comes-of-age (with varying commencement ages depending on family but usually it happens between the ages of 11 to 16) has their first proper turban tied on their head in a ceremony.

== Modern trend ==
The tradition of keeping hair uncut has diminished in recent times, and it is estimated that half of India's Sikh men cut their hair. Reasons include simple convenience (avoiding the daily combing and tying), following their parents' lead, and social pressure from the mainstream culture to adjust their appearance to fit the norm.

=== Harassment ===
After the attacks of September 11, 2001, Sikhs in the West have been mistaken for Muslims and subjected to hate crimes. Balbir Singh Sodhi, a Sikh living in Mesa, Arizona, was shot to death on September 16, 2001, when he was mistaken for a Muslim.

In 2007, an 17-year-old Pakistani-American teenager, Umair Ahmed, forcibly cut the hair of a 15-year-old Sikh boy Harpal Vacher in a US school. In 2008, he was convicted by the jury of "second-degree menacing as a hate crime, second-degree coercion as a hate crime, fourth-degree criminal possession of a weapon, and third-degree harassment," and was sentenced to probation, community service, and completion of a tolerance program.

In 2009, Resham Singh, a Punjabi student in Melbourne, Australia, was attacked by a group of teenagers who tried to remove his turban and cut his hair.

In 2010, Basant Singh, a Sikh youth in Penang, Malaysia, woke up discovering his hair was cut by 50 cm when he was asleep in his dormitory while serving the Malaysian National Service Training Programme. The incident traumatised the youth and is being probed as ordered by the Defence Ministry.

== See also ==
- Rumal
- Patka
- Thatha
- Salai (needle)

== Gallery ==
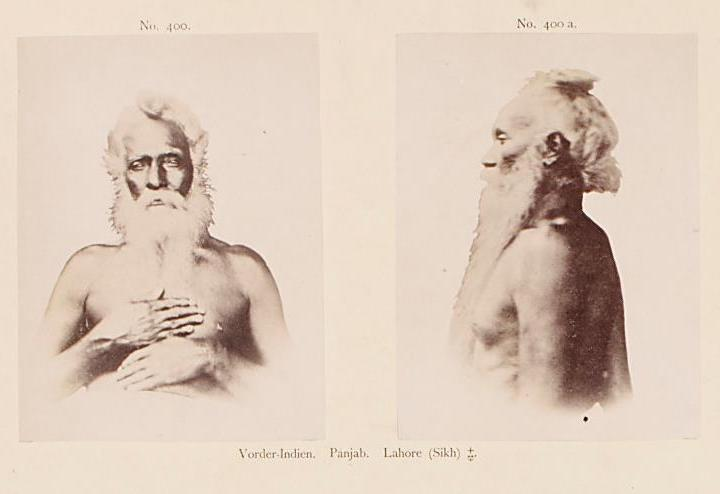
Anthropological photographs of a Lahori Sikh man, by Carl W. Damman, ca.1873. He maintained kesh (unshorn hair), with it being tied in a top-knot.

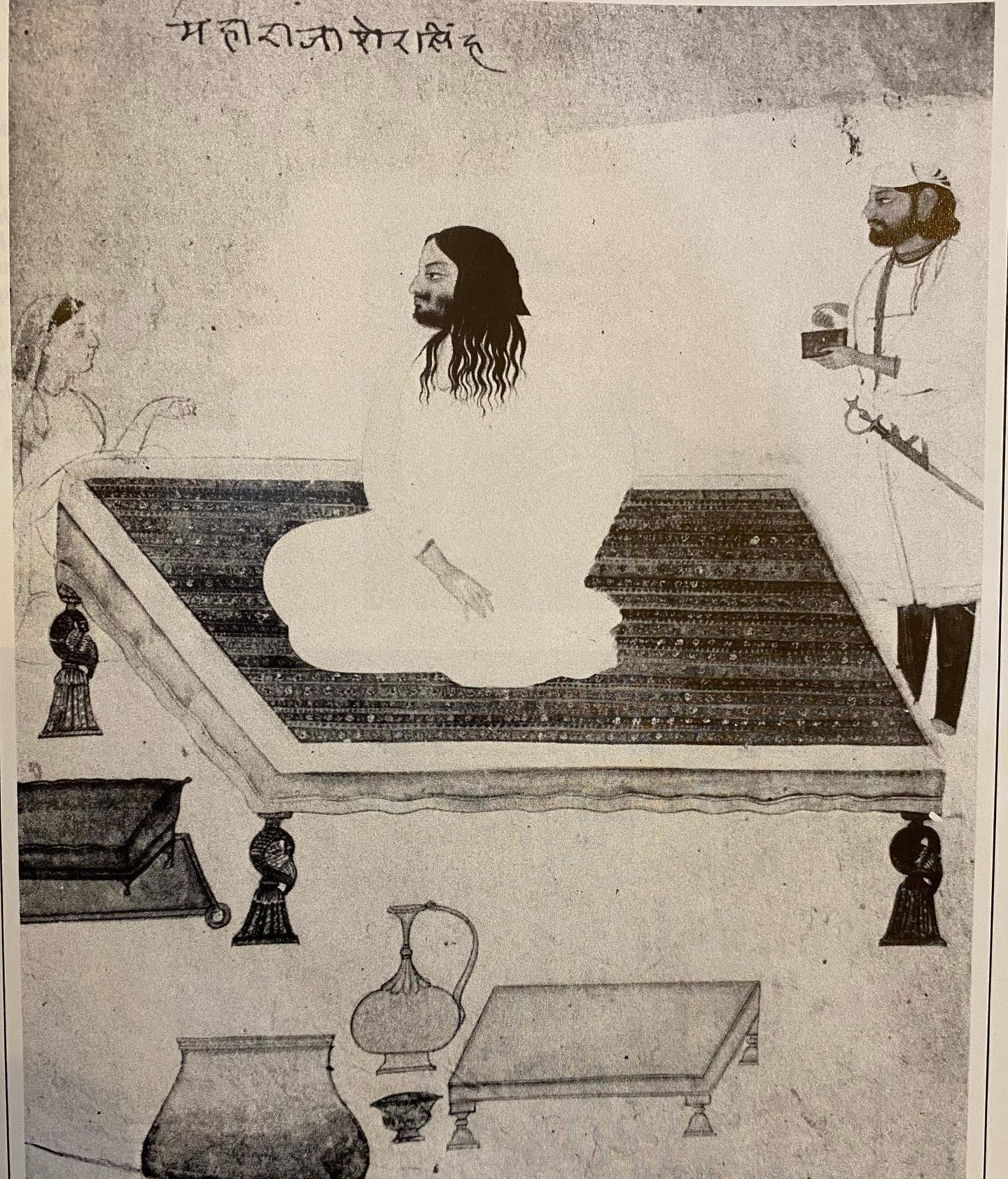
Painting of Maharaja Sher Singh after a bath with his hair down

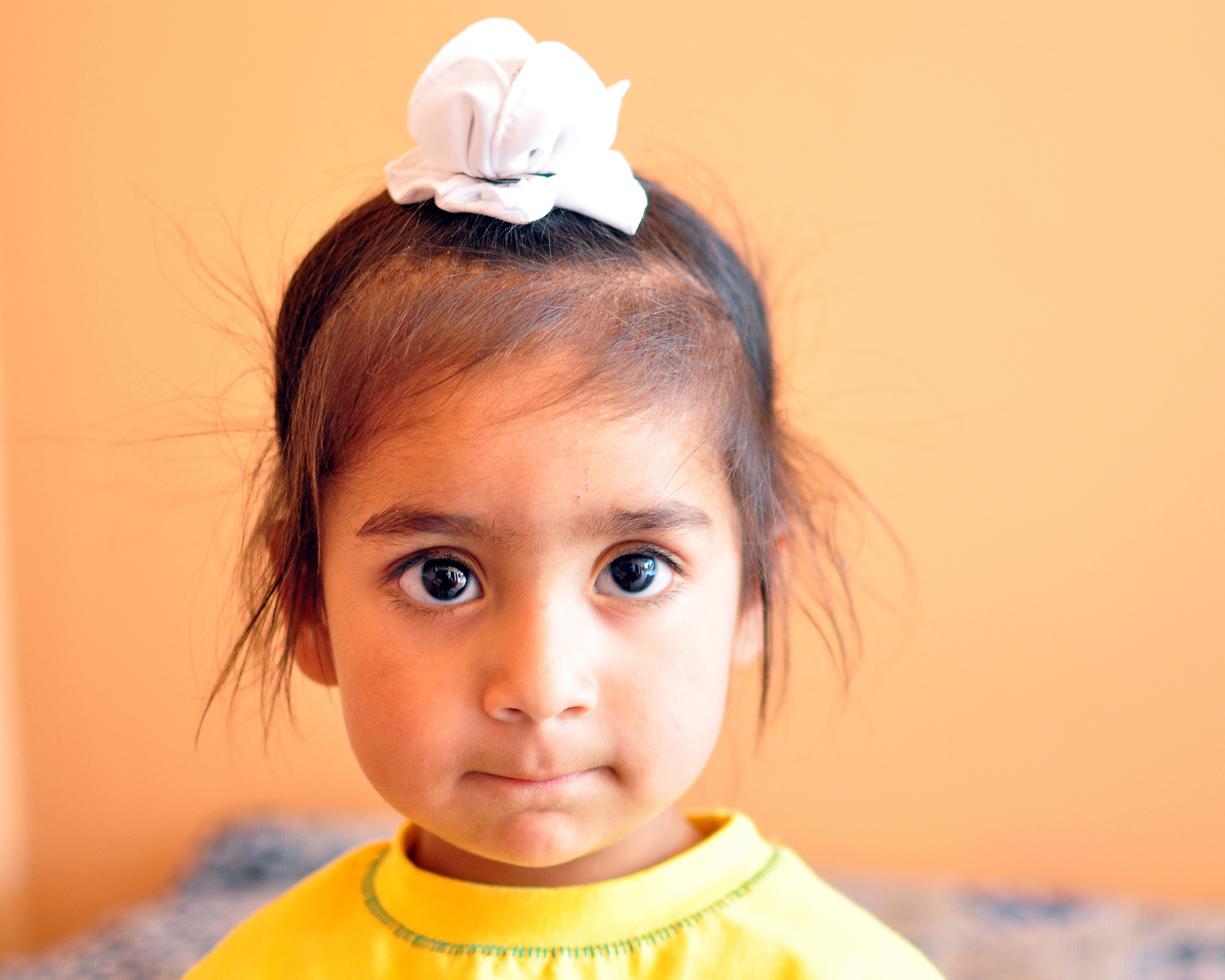
A Sikh boy wearing a rumāl

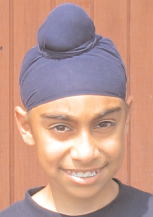
A Sikh boy wearing a patka

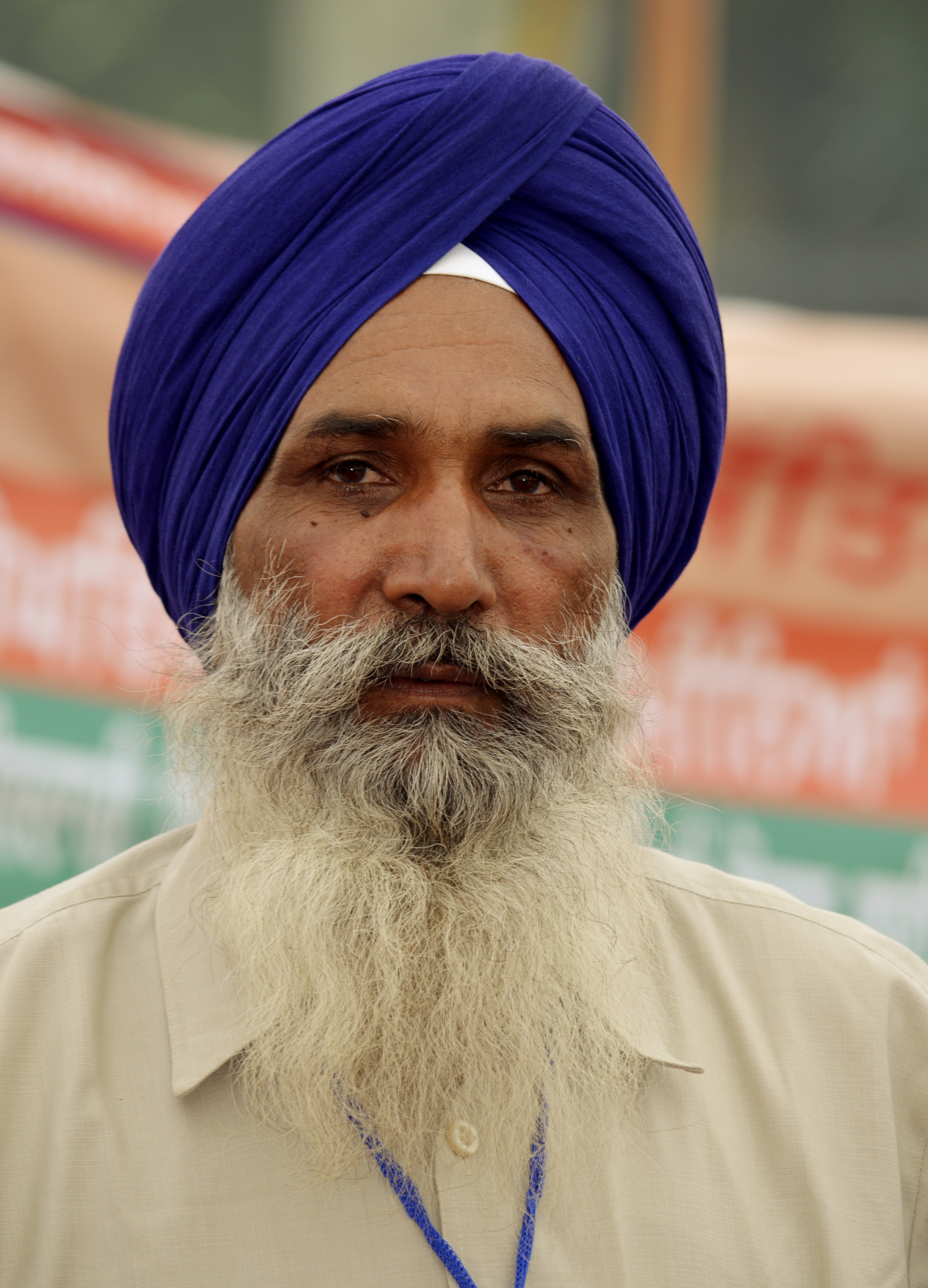
A Sikh man wearing a dastar or pagh (turban)
