= Five Ks =

Five articles of faith that Khalsa Sikhs wear at all times

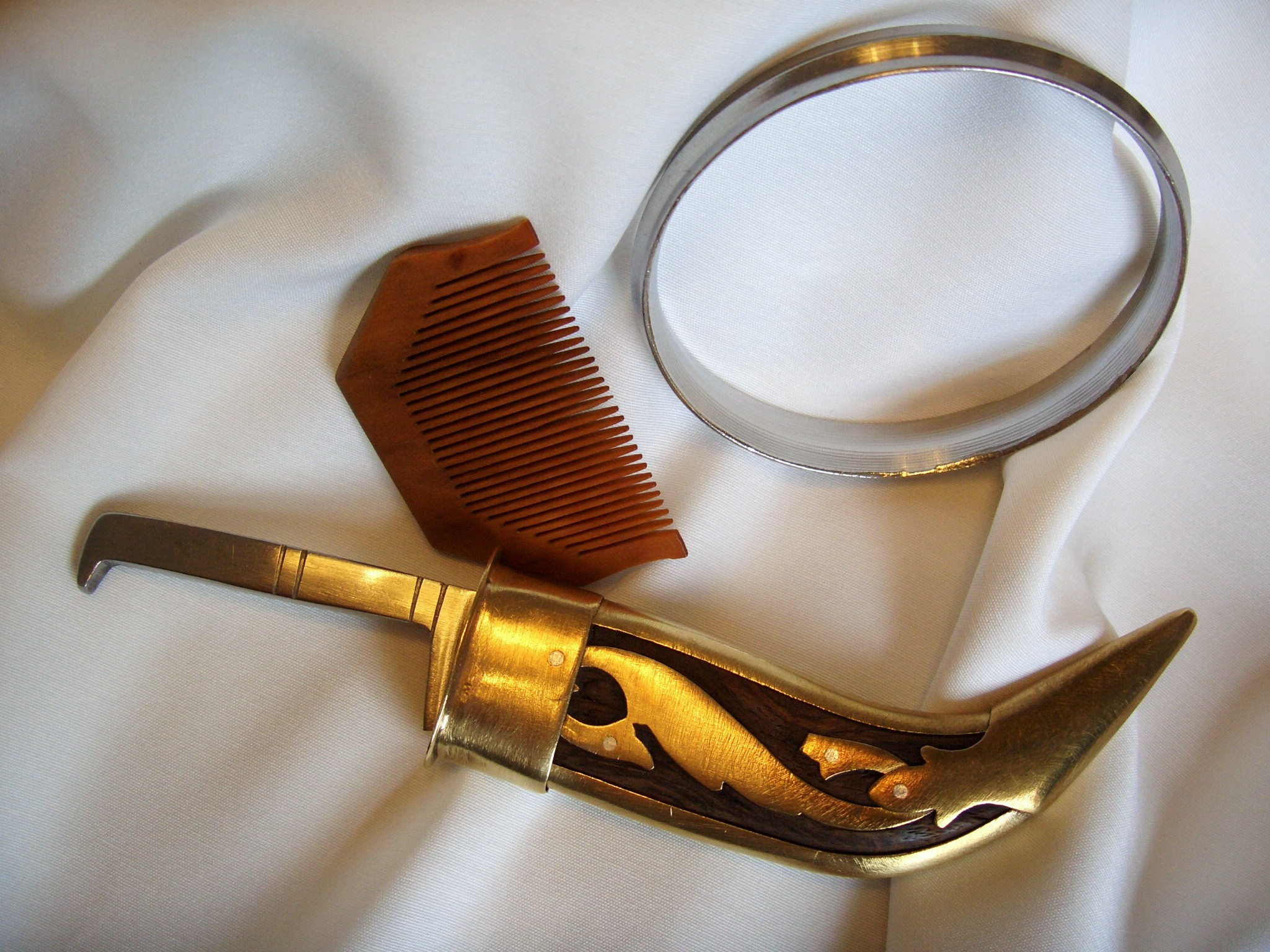
Kanga, Kara and Kirpan – three of the five Ks

In Sikhism, the Five Ks (Punjabi: ਪੰਜ ਕਕਾਰ, Pañj Kakār, Punjabi pronunciation: [ˈpənd͡ʒ.ˈkəˌka:ɾ]) are five items that Guru Gobind Singh, in 1699, commanded Khalsa Sikhs to wear at all times. They are: kesh (ਕੇਸ਼, keś, uncut hair and beard), kangha (ਕੰਘਾ, kãṅghā, a comb for the kesh, usually wood), kara (ਕੜਾ, kaṛā, a bracelet, usually made of iron or steel), kachhera (ਕਛੈਰਾ, kachairā, an undergarment), and kirpan (ਕਿਰਪਾਨ, kirpān, a small curved sword or knife made of iron or steel). In Punjabi, they are known as the Panj Kakkar or Panj Kakke.

The Five Ks are not just symbols, but articles of faith that collectively form the external identity and the Khalsa devotee's commitment to the Sikh rehni, 'Sikh way of life'. A Sikh who has taken Amrit and keeps all five Ks is known as Khalsa ('pure') or Amritdhari Sikh ('Amrit Sanskar participant'), a Sikh who has not taken Amrit but follows the teachings of the Sri Guru Granth Sahib is called a Sahajdhari Sikh.

== History ==
Three of the Ks, namely the kirpan, kara, and kachera, can be traced back earlier to Guru Hargobind, who required his warriors to wear them. All of the 5Ks are first mentioned in the Sri Gur Katha, a text attributed to Bhai Jaita.

== Kesh ==
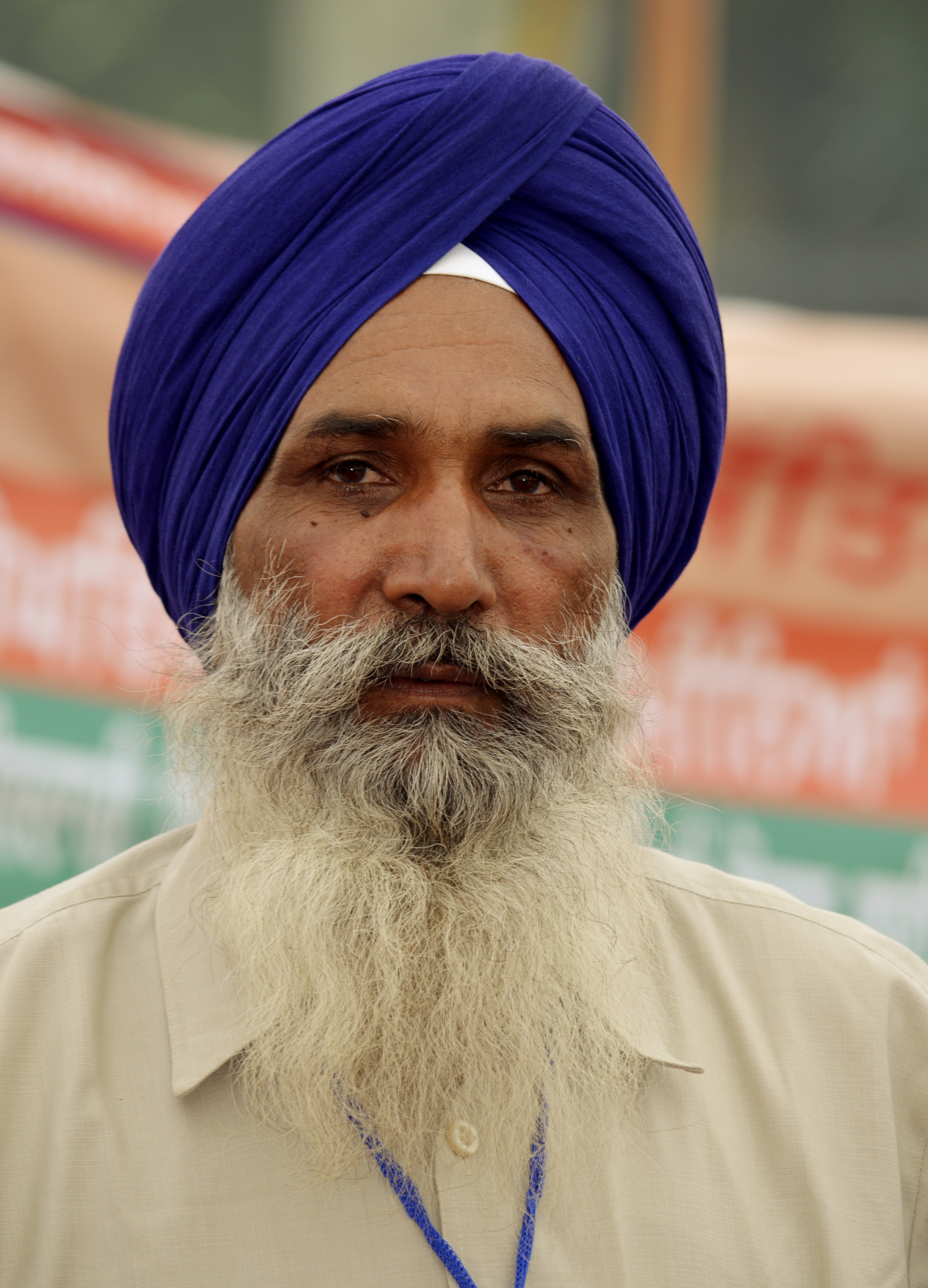
A Sikh man having Kesh of long beard and head hairs, wearing a turban

The kesh, also known as "kesa", or uncut, long hair, is considered by Sikhs to be an indispensable part of the human body. It also emulates the appearance of Guru Gobind Singh and is one of the primary signs by which a Sikh can be clearly and quickly identified. A Sikh never cuts or trims any hair as a symbol of respect for the perfection of God's creation. The uncut long hair and the beard, in the case of men, form the main kakār for Sikhs.

The turban is a spiritual crown, which is a constant reminder to the Sikh that they are sitting on the throne of consciousness and are committed to living according to Sikh principles. Guru Gobind Singh told his Sikhs:

"Khalsa mero roop hai khaas. Khalsa mai ho karo nivaas... The Khalsa is my image. Within the Khalsa I reside."

A noted figure in Sikh history is Bhai Taru Singh, who was martyred when he refused to get his kesh cut.

== Kangha ==
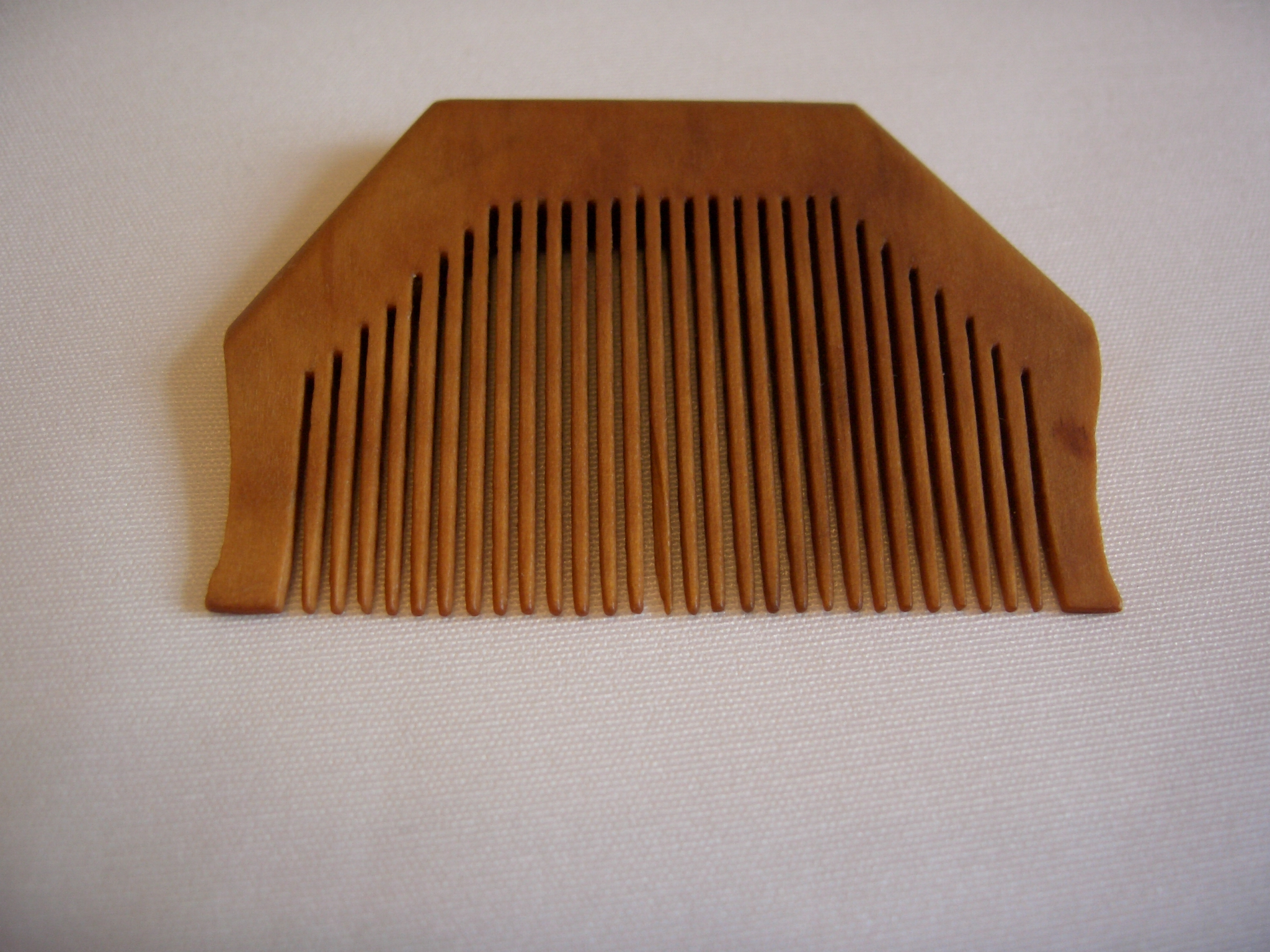
Kangha – one of the five articles of faith for the Sikhs

Comb the hair twice a day, covering it with turban that is to be tied from fresh.

— Tankhanama Bhai Nand Lal Singh

A kanga is a medium-sized wooden comb that Sikhs use twice a day. It is supposed to be worn only in the hair and at all times. Combs help to clean and remove tangles from the hair and are a symbol of cleanliness. Combing their hair reminds Sikhs that their lives should be tidy and organized.

The comb keeps the hair tidy, a symbol of not just accepting what God has given, but also an injunction to maintain it with grace. The Guru Granth Sahib said hair should be allowed to grow naturally; this precludes any shaving for both men and women. In the Guru's time, some holy men let their hair become tangled and dirty. The Guru said that this was not right; that hair should be allowed to grow but it should be kept clean and combed at least twice a day.

== Kara ==
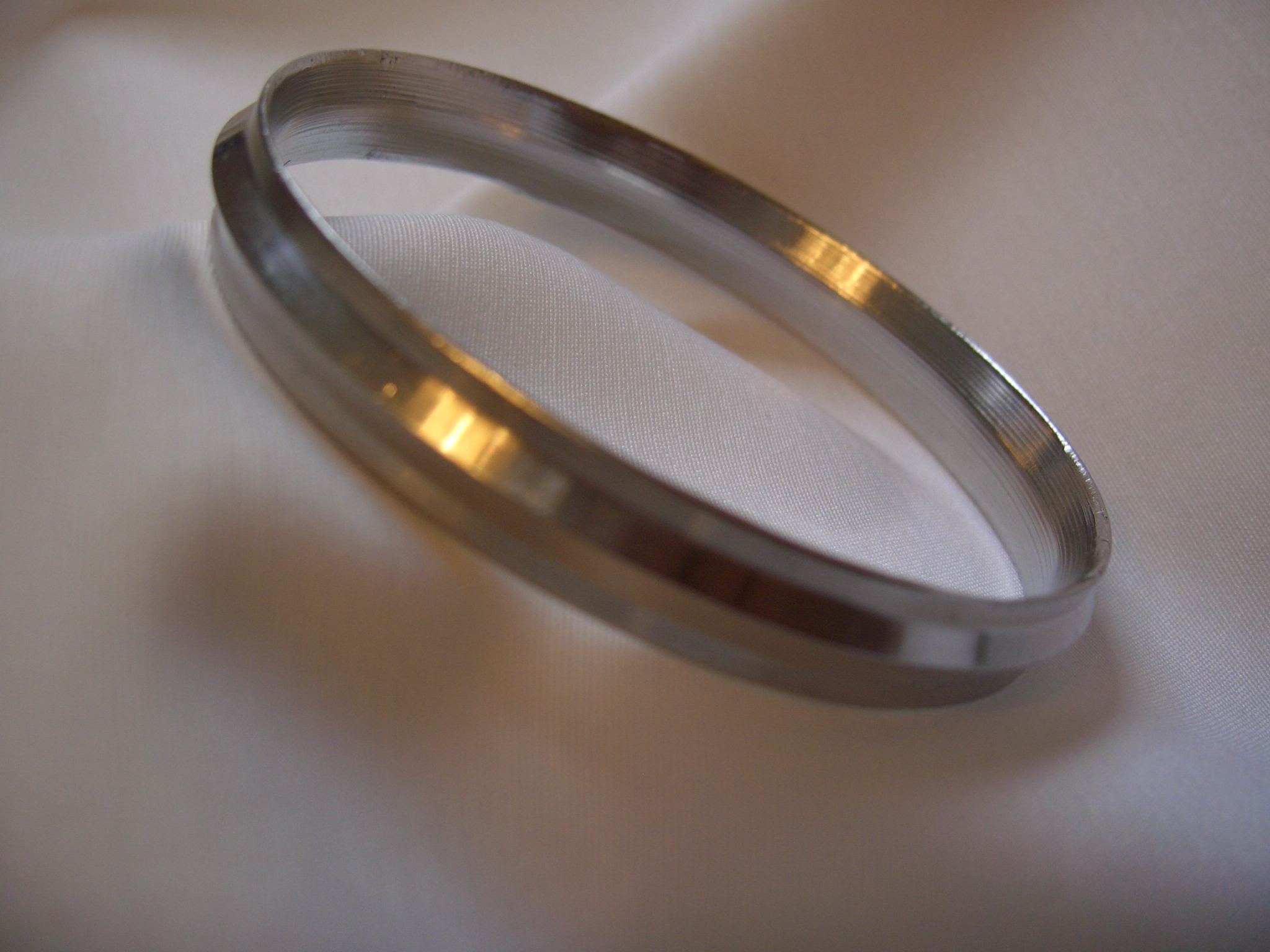
Kara – one of the five articles of faith for the Sikhs

The Sikhs were commanded by Guru Gobind Singh at the Baisakhi Amrit Sanchar in 1699 to wear an iron bracelet called a Kara at all times. The kara is a constant reminder that whatever a person does with their hands has to be in keeping with the advice given by the Guru. The kara is an iron/steel circle to symbolize God as never-ending. It is a symbol of permanent bonding to the community, of being a link in the chain of Khalsa Sikhs (the word for link is Kari). The kara should be of a cheap metal, such as iron or steel, to show equality and so that nobody can be shown as more important than anybody else with the material of their kara.

== Kachera ==
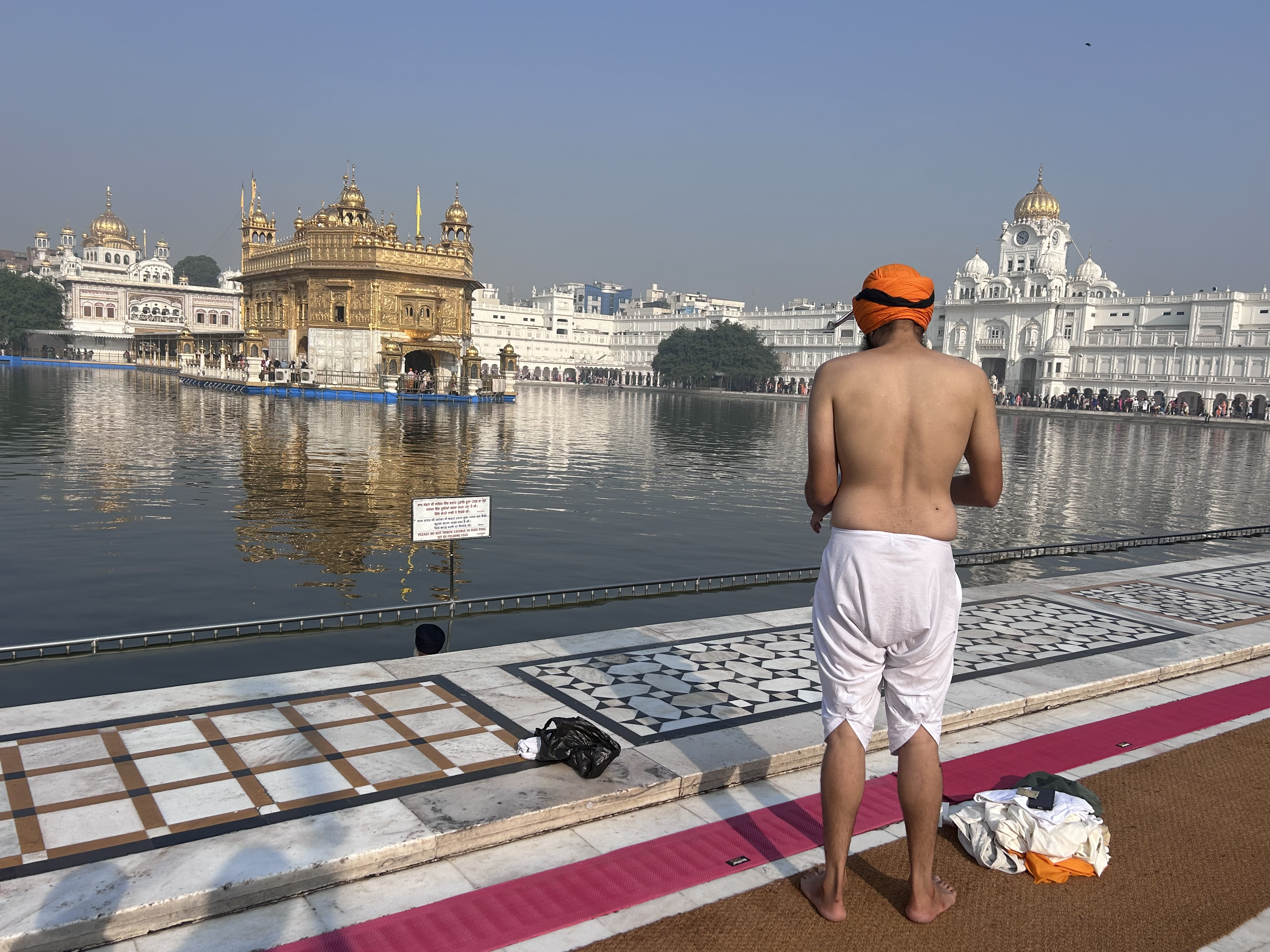
A Sikh wearing Kachera, after taking bath in the holy water tank (Sarovar) at Golden Temple Amritsar.

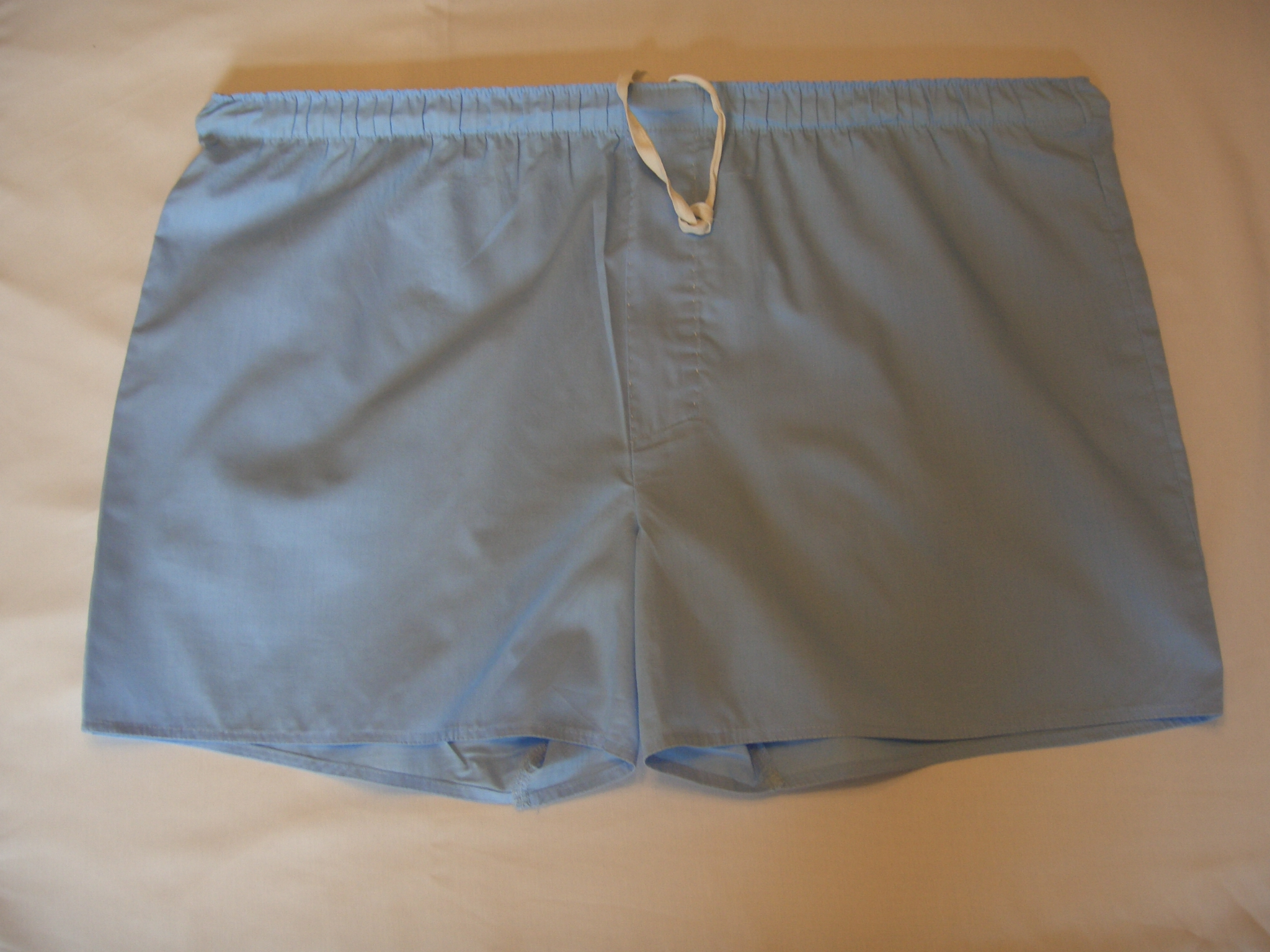
Kachhera

ਸੀਲ ਜਤ ਕੀ ਕਛ ਪਹਿਰਿ ਪਕਿੜਓ ਹਿਥਆਰਾ ॥ The sign of true chastity is the Kachhera, you must wear this and hold weapons in hand.

— Bhai Gurdas Singh, Var. 41, pauri 15

The Kachera is a shalwar-underwear with a tie-knot worn by baptised Sikhs. Originally, the Kachhera was made part of the five Ks as a symbol of a Sikh soldier's willingness to be ready at a moment's notice for battle or for defense. The confirmed Sikh (one who has taken the Amrit) wears a Kachhera every day. Some of them go to the extent of wearing a Kachhera while bathing, to be ready at a moment's notice, changing into the new one a single leg at a time, so as to have no moment where they are unprepared. Further, this garment allowed the Sikh soldier to operate in combat freely and without any hindrance or restriction, because it was easy to fabricate, maintain, wash, and carry compared to other traditional undergarments of that era, like the dhoti. The Kachhera symbolizes self-respect, and always reminds the wearer of mental control over lust, one of the Five Evils in Sikh philosophy.

The Kachera follows a generally practical and roomy design. It features an embedded string that circles the waist which can be tightened or loosened as desired and then knotted securely. The Kachera can be classed between underwear and an outer garment, as in appearance it does not reveal private anatomy, and looks and wears like shorts. As with all of the Five Ks, there is equality between men and women, and so women are also expected to wear it. Considering the hot climate in India, the Kachera is often worn by men as an outer garment, keeping the wearer cool and being practical in manual work such as farming, but it is generally not considered respectful for women to wear the Kachera as an outer garment (on its own) as it is considered too revealing.

== Kirpan ==
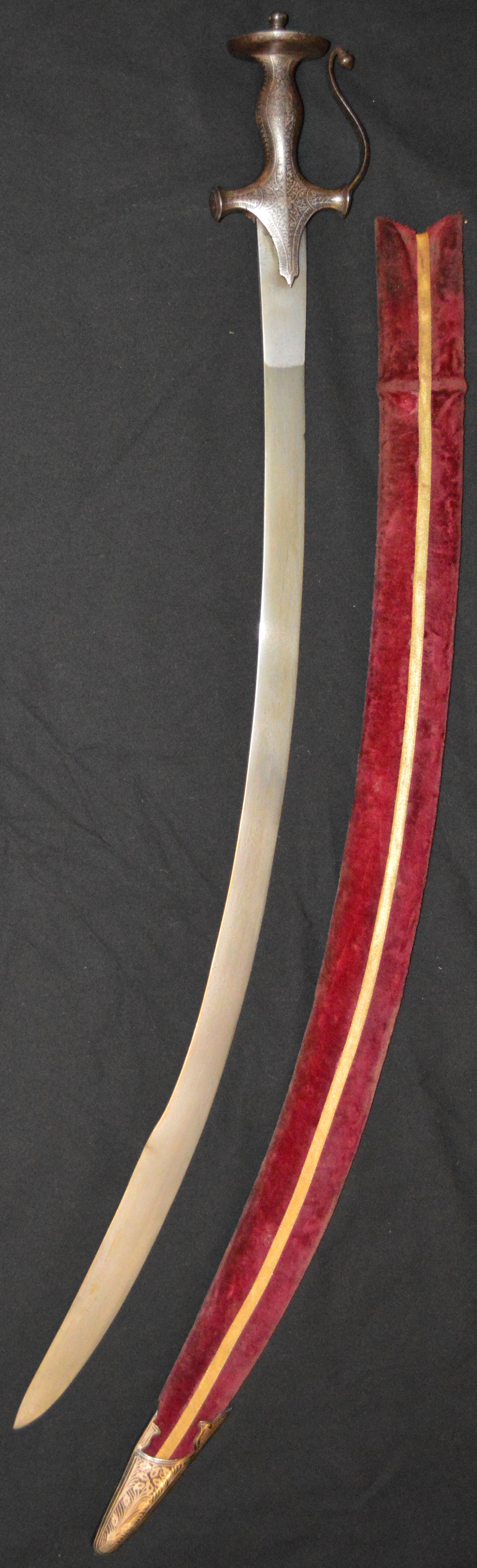
19th century Indian tulwar sword.

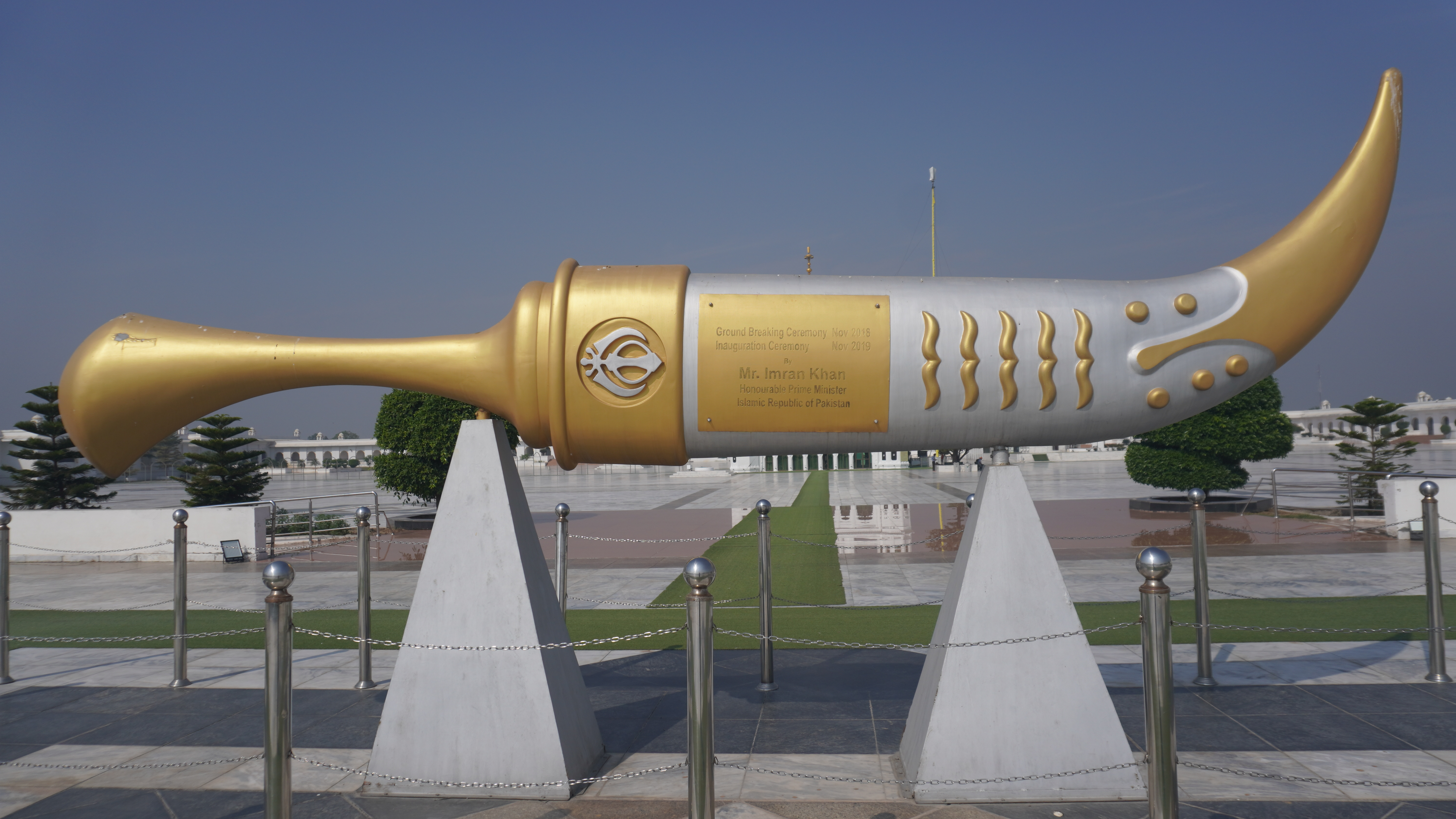
Statue of a kirpan, one of five symbols of Sikhism, outside the gurdwara Kartarpur Sahib in Pakistan.

ਸ਼ਸਤਰ ਹੀਨ ਕਬਹੂ ਨਹਿ ਹੋਈ, ਰਿਹਤਵੰਤ ਖਾਲਸਾ ਸੋਈ ॥Those who never depart their arms, they are the Khalsa with excellent rehats.

— Rehatnama Bhai Desa Singh

The kirpan is a dagger that symbolises a Sikh's duty to come to the defense of those in peril. All Sikhs should wear the kirpan on their body at all times as a defensive side-arm, just as a police officer is expected to wear a side-arm when on duty. Its use is only allowed in the act of self-defense and the protection of others. It stands for bravery and protecting the weak and innocent.

The kirpan is kept sharp and is used to defend others, such as those who are oppressed by harsh rulers, or a person who is being robbed, raped, or beaten. The true Sikh cannot turn a blind eye to such evils, thinking that they are "someone else's concern." It is the duty of the true Sikh to help those who suffer unjustly, by whatever means available, whether that means alerting the police, summoning help, or defending those who cannot defend themselves, even if that means putting oneself in harm's way.

== Panj Kapde ==
The Five Ks are the bare minimum and are not the full extent of Khalsa uniform; the Panj Kapde is also part of Khalsa uniform. It is part of the tradition of panj kapare (five garments), comprising dastaar (turban), hazooria (long white scarf worn around the neck), long chola (dress), kamar-kasaa (material tied around the waist like a belt) and kacchera (under-garment). Reference to this has been made by Varan Bhai Gurdas as well. The dastaar and kachera are mandatory for Sikhs although more spiritual Sikhs also have the other kapde.

=== Dastaar ===
A dastār (Punjabi: ਦਸਤਾਰ, from Persian: دستار) which derives from dast-e-yār or 'the hand of God', is an item of headwear associated with Sikhism, and is an important part of Sikh culture. The word is loaned from Persian through Punjabi. In Persian, the word dastār can refer to any kind of turban and replaced the original word for turban, dolband (دلبند), from which the English word is derived.

Among the Sikhs, the dastār is an article of faith that represents equality, honour, self-respect, courage, spirituality, and piety. The Khalsa Sikh men and women, who keep the Five Ks, wear the turban to cover their long, uncut hair (kesh). The Sikhs regard the dastār as an important part of the unique Sikh identity. After the ninth Sikh Guru, Tegh Bahadur, was sentenced to death by the Mughal emperor Aurangzeb, Guru Gobind Singh, the tenth Sikh Guru created the Khalsa and gave five articles of faith, one of which is unshorn hair, which the dastār covers.

=== Sikh chola ===
Sikh chola is traditional dress worn by Sikhs. It is a martial attire that gives freedom of movement to a Sikh warrior. Sikh chola is also unisex attire, and may be heavily decorated with embroidery. It is meant to be either yellow, white or cyan with many pockets to hold matchlock pistols and other weapons.

=== Kamar kasa ===
Kamar kasa is a sash bound around the waist to hold weapons an essential part of Nihang (Sikh warrior) dress. It is also called cumberband, belt, waist sash, or waistband. The Kamar kasa is meant to be yellow if wearing a blue chola or blue if wearing a white chola.

=== Hazooria ===
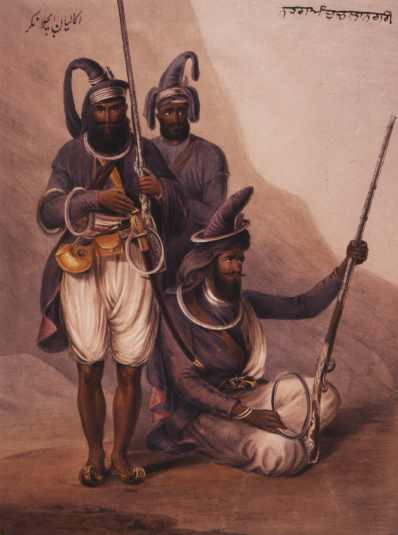
Nihang Sikhs wearing chakrams

A hazooria (scarf) is a sign of humility which is grasped during the Ardās. It is a constant reminder of surrendering one's mind to the Guru, along with the five Ks. A hazooria is practical: it helps one keep suchamta (cleanliness) during seva (service) or reading Gurbani (hymns). It can help keep the hands clean when touching the face or picking up objects. The hazooria was also worn by servants and symbolises the Sikh surrendering to Waheguruji as their master.

== Panj Hathiar ==
Guru Gobind Singh required his Khalsa warriors to be armed with five weapons at all times, consisting of the sword, disc, arrow, noose, and gun.

== See also ==
- Amritdhari
- Gursikh
- Khalsa
- Vaisakhi
