= Bhai Jiwan Singh =

Sikh general (1661–1704)

Baba Jiwan Singh
- ਬਾਬਾ ਜੀਵਨ ਸਿੰਘ ਭਾਈ ਜੈਤਾ
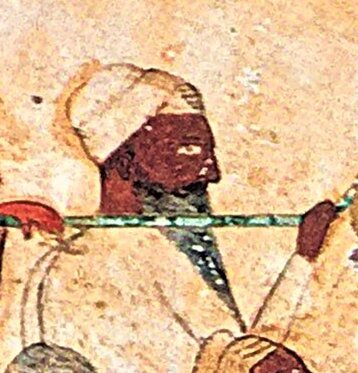
- Bhai Jaita, detail from a fresco painting of the scene from Anandpur Sahib where Guru Gobind Singh bows to the head of Guru Tegh Bahadur which was brought in palanquin, led by Bhai Jaita
- Born: Jag Chand; 30 November 1649; Kiratpur
- Died: 7 December 1705 (aged 56); Shahi Tibbi, Sirsa River, Lahore Subah, Mughal Empire (present-day Rupnagar district, Punjab, India)
- Spouse: Raj Kaur
- Children: Bhai Gulzar Singh; Bhai Gurdayal Singh; Bhai Sukha; Bhai Sewa Singh
- Parent(s): Sada Nand; Mata Premo
- Relatives: Bhai Khazan Singh (father-in-law)

Baba Jiwan Singh (Gurmukhi: ਬਾਬਾ ਜੀਵਨ ਸਿੰਘ; born Jaitha; 30 November 1649 – 7 December 1705) was a Sikh general and companion of Guru Gobind Singh. He is remembered by Sikhs for bringing the severed head of Guru Tegh Bahadur to Anandpur Sahib so it could be cremated rather than remaining in Mughal possession. He wrote a hagiographical account of the tenth guru's life, known as Sri Gur Katha. He was regarded as the Panjwan Sahibjada (fifth son) of Guru Gobind Singh due to the respect he held in Sikh circles.

== Family background ==
Jaita's great-great-grandfather, Bhai Kaliana of Kathu Nangal (Amritsar district), had converted to Sikhism during the era of Akbar and the Sikh gurus Ram Das and Arjan. Jaita's great-grandfather Sukhbhan shifted to Delhi and became an accomplished musician who founded the Kalyan Ashram at Raiseena, later known as the Kalayane di Dharamshala with it being used for accommodation by visiting Sikhs, including Guru Tegh Bahadur on 20 January 1670 when he was returning from Assam. Jaita's grandfather Jasbhan was a musician associated with Guru Har Rai. Jasbhan had two sons, named Agya Ram and Sada Nand, with Sada Nand being close to the ninth Sikh guru and was the father of Jaita.

== Early life ==
Bhai Jaita was born as Jag Chand (with the diminutive forms Jagu or Jota) in Kiratpur on 30 November 1649 to father Sada Nand (or Sada Chand) and mother Mata Karmo. Other sources claims he was born on 13 December 1661 in Patna and that his mother was named Premo. He was the eldest son of the family, he had a younger brother named Bhag Chand (nicknamed Bhagu). His family were originally based in Kiratpur, serving Guru Har Rai.. The Patna version of his early life claims he grew up at Patna where he got training in various weapons and learned the art of warfare. In addition, he learned horse-riding, swimming, music, and kirtan. Later, either from Kiratpur or Patna, Jaita and his family shifted to Jhanda Ramdas village, and served Bhai Gurditta (1625–1675), the great-great-grandson of Baba Buddha.

== Career ==
Bhai Gurditta was arrested alongside the ninth Sikh guru in Delhi. Jaita was in Delhi as his family had instructed him to give a message to the imprisoned Gurditta. When Guru Tegh Bahadur, the ninth guru of Sikh, was martyred on 11 November 1675 by the Mughals at Chandni Chowk, Delhi, Bhai Jiwan Singh along with two other Sikhs, recovered his dismembered body from a crowd and brought it back to his son, Guru Gobind Singh. Initially, no Sikh had the courage to recover the martyred guru's remains until Jaita made a successful attempt.

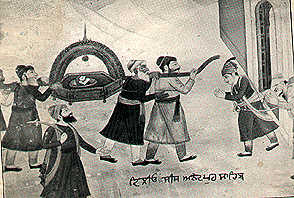
Painting of the head of Guru Tegh Bahadar being brought to Anandpur, where Guru Gobind Singh pays obeisance, circa 19th century

There after Guru Gobind Singh honoured them with the title Mazhabi ("faithful") and said loudly, "Rangrete Guru Ke Bete"(The Rangretas are the Guru's sons) to the all Mazhabi Sikhs. After that, Bhai Jiwan Singh was instructed by his father to behead him in order to swap the head of his father for that of Guru Tegh Bahadur. Bhai Jiwan Singh carries out his father's wish and carried the head of Guru Tegh Bahadur from Delhi to Gobind Rai in Anandpur Sahib. Jaita remained at Anandpur Sahib thereafter and became a nagarchi (drum-beater) of the Ranjit Nagara established by Guru Gobind Singh. He was renamed Jeevan Singh after his Khalsa initiation, which occurred on 30 March 1699. He served as a marksman in the guru's army and also was responsible for training two of the guru's sons, Ajit Singh and Jujhar Singh, in warfare.

== Battles and death ==
Jiwan Singh participated in all the Sikh battles against Mughal and Pahari forces. Baba Jiwan Singh was with the Guru during the evacuation of Anandpur Sahib and fought the battles of Bhangani, Nadaun, Anandpur Sahib, Bajrur, Nirmohgarh, all four wars of Anandpur Sahib, Bansali/Kalmot, Sarsa and the battle of Chamkaur. In Dictionary of Battles and Sieges, the author states that Bhai Jiwan Singh attained martyrdom at Shahi Tibbi while the Sikh army was attempting to cross the Sirsa River. According to The Encyclopaedia of Sikhism, he was killed during the Battle of Chamkaur on 7 December 1705.

== Marriage ==
Jaita married Raj Kaur, daughter of Surjan Singh of Riar village, in 1691. The couple had four sons.

== Literature ==
Bhai Jiwan Singh also wrote about the exploits of Guru Gobind Singh, in his magnum opus the Sri Gur Katha. His pen-name was Jaiyata or Jaiyate.

== Legacy ==
After his death in 1704 or 1705 a burj (tower) was erected to honour him at Gurudwara Shaheed Burj Sahib at Chamkaur.

== See also ==
- Martyrdom in Sikhism
- Shaheed
