= Kangha =

Small comb and article of faith for Sikhs

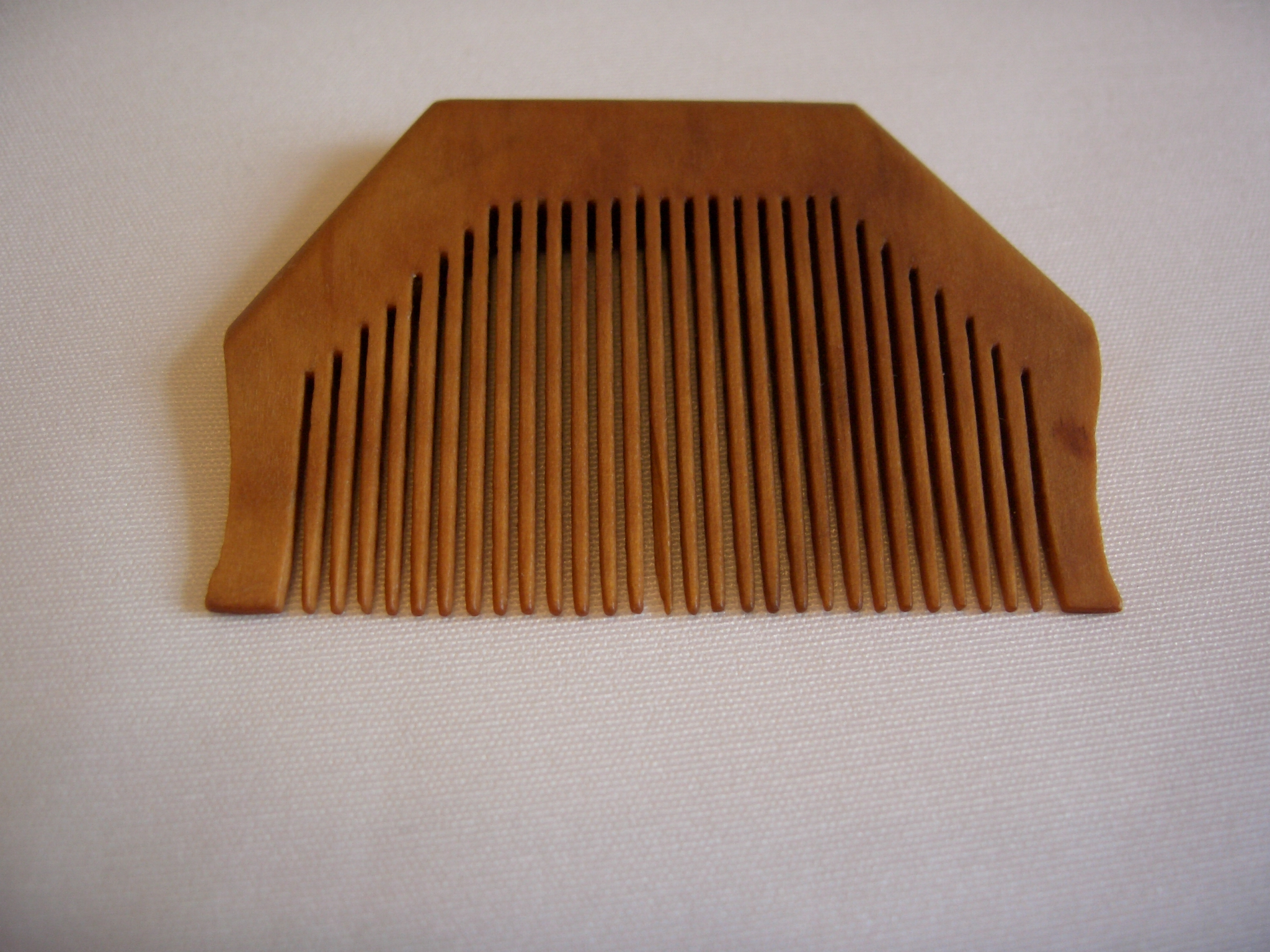
Kangha – one of the five articles of faith for the Sikhs

A kangha (Punjabi: ਕੰਘਾ/کنگھا) is a small wooden comb that Sikhs usually use twice a day and part of the Five Ks. It is supposed to be kept with the hair at all times. Combs help to clean the hair, and are a symbol of cleanliness. Combing their hair reminds Sikhs that their lives should be tidy and organised. The kangha makes the uncut hair neat and keeps away tangles. Kanghas were traditionally made of wood, but many modern Sikhs employ ones made of plastic.

== History ==
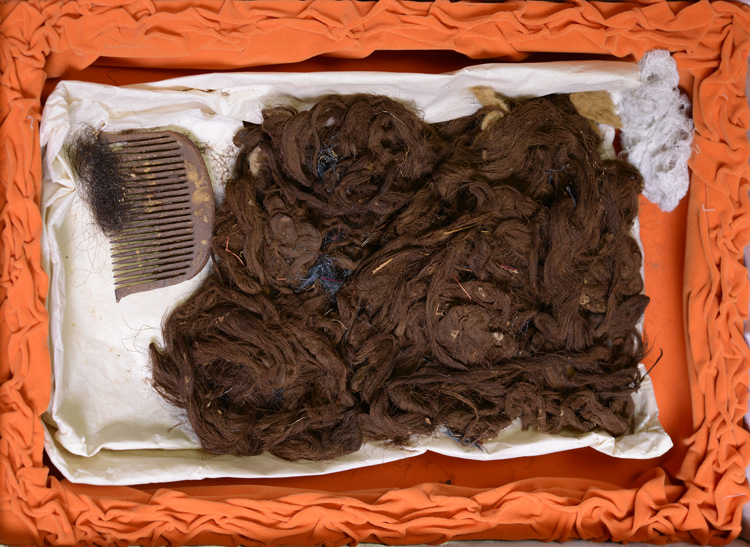
Dastar, Kanga & Kesh of Guru Gobind Singh Jee gifted to the Punjab Government by the royal family of the former state of Nabha

The Sikhs were mandated by Guru Gobind Singh at the Baisakhi Amrit Sanchar in 1699 to wear a small comb called a kangha at all times. Kangha must be kept by all baptised Sikhs (Khalsa), after a mandatory religious commandment given by Guru Gobind Singh (the tenth Guru of Sikhism) in 1699. This was one of five articles of faith, collectively called Kakars, that form the externally visible symbols to clearly and outwardly display one's commitment and dedication to the order (Hukam) of the tenth master and become a member of Khalsa.

The kangha is an article that allows the Sikh to care for his or her unshorn long hair, kesh. The kangha is usually tucked behind the "Rishi Knot" and tied under the turban. It is to be used twice daily to comb and keep the hair in a disentangled and tidy condition. It represents the importance of discipline and cleanliness to a Sikh way of life and is used to keep the hair healthy, clean, shining and tangle-free. The kangha is tucked under the rishi knot to keep the rishi knot firm and in place.

The kangha is placed in the hair but it is not visible as the turban covers it.
