= Sikhism in Assam =

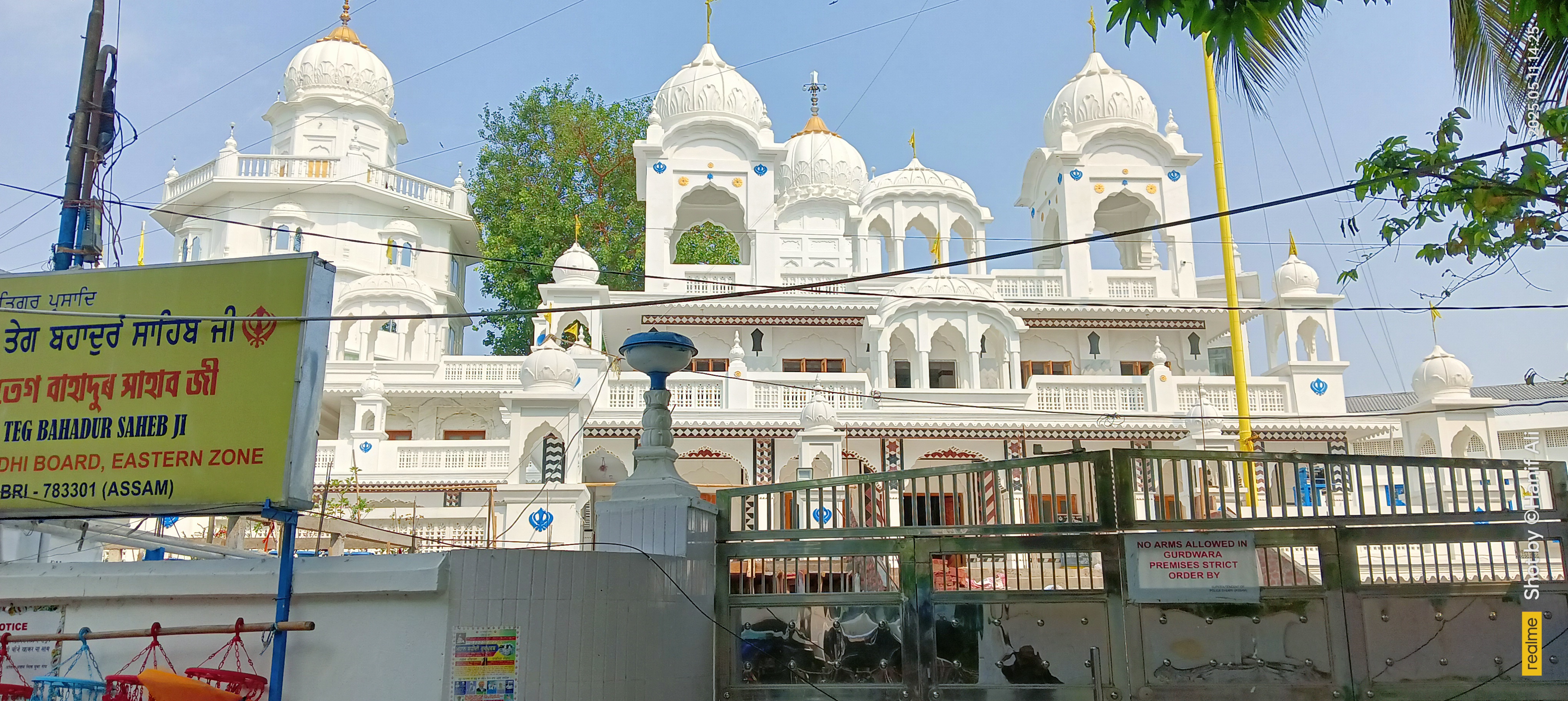
- Local gurdwara in Dhubri, Assam

Regions with significant populations
- Nagaon district

Religions
- Sikhism

Languages
- Punjabi • Assamese

Assamese Sikhs, also known as Axomiya Sikhs or Asomiya Sikhs, are a Sikh community found in Assam, India. The Sikh community of Assam consists of both local Assamese Sikhs and Punjabi Sikhs and their descendants. The Assamese Sikhs differ phenotypically from Punjabi Sikhs, instead resembling the local populace in-appearance.

== History ==
=== Sikh gurus ===
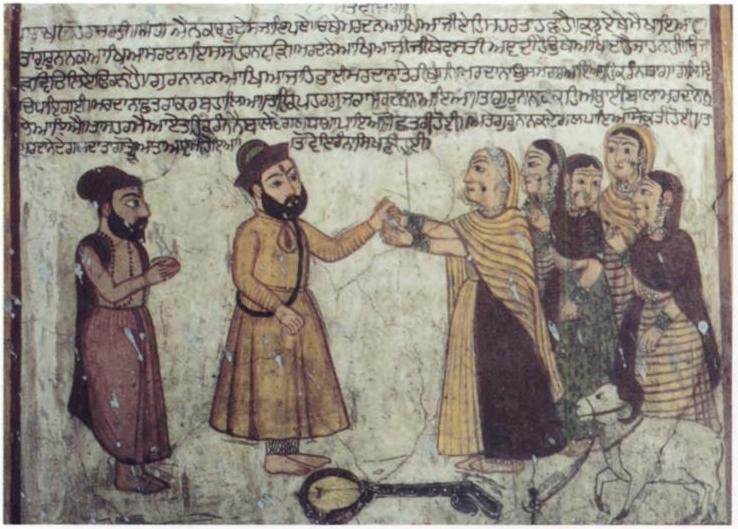
'Nanak meets the temptresses in Kamrup Desa', Janamsakhi mural painting depicting a scene from Guru Nanak's life from the Ram Rai Darbar complex at Dehradun

Guru Nanak is said to have travelled to the Kamrup region (or Karudesh) in the early part of the 16th century. Surindar Singh Kohli claims Guru Nanak entered Assam in the year 1505. According to Surjit Singh Gandhi, Guru Nanak visited Dhubri via a route from northern Bihar and northwest Bengal whilst other scholars claim Guru Nanak used the path later known as the Sher Shah Suri Road. After Dhubri, he visited a location near Guwahati.

The Sikh tales, known as janamsakhis, of his travel in the region involve magic and witches, with the region being ruled by a woman named Nur Shah. As per the legend, Nur Shah and her entourage of witches tried to bewitch the Sikh guru and Mardana using magic spells, then they tried dancing and singing, and lastly tried giving them valuable material goods, however they ultimately failed and ended-up ultimately surrendering to the guru. The guru then gave them naam and requested them to stop practicing magic. Afterwards, Nanak left Kamrupa via the Brahmaputra river and returned to Puri in Odisha. There are no historical sources to corroborate the tale, which is similar to other contemporary stories that link Assam to being a land of sorcery and magic, with the Sikh sources claiming the region to be Istri Desh ("land of women") and associated with Tantra. It is further narrated that Guru Nanak visited Dhanpur and met with Shankardev, a Vaishnavist. A chronicle by Mohammad Kazim records the existence of a tribe named Nanak. Guru Nanak is then said to have travelled further east to Asa Desh, east of the Brahmaputra, which was ruled by a figure named Raja Swarg Narain, descended from Samundrak. There, the guru is claimed to have travelled to Gola Ghat Nagar and onwards to the Dhanasri Valley between the Naga and Mikir Hills, where he apparently encountered cannibals known as Koda Rakshas, possibly the Kodan tribe. From there, Guru Nanak returned to Gauhati via a river and continued to Shillong.

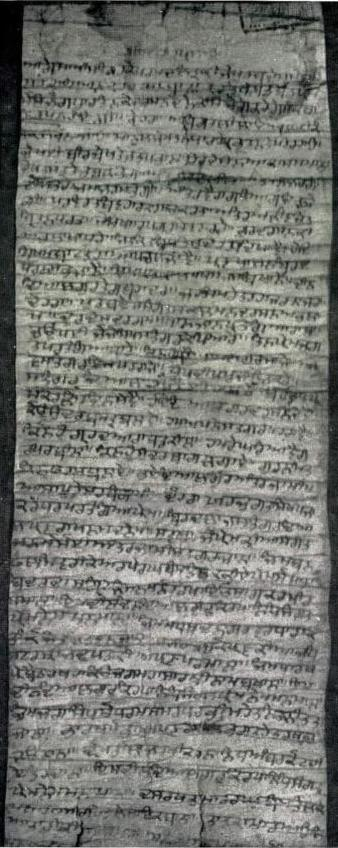
Document on Guru Tegh Bahadur's presence in the Kamarupa region of Assam

Contemporary Assamese documents also record the visit of the ninth Sikh guru, Guru Tegh Bahadur, to the area in 1669 to assist Raja Ram Singh against the local Ahom ruler. However, the Sikh sources seem to confuse many dates, places, and persons when recording the ninth guru's stay in Assam but he likely did have a presence in the region. While in Assam, it is claimed by Sikh accounts that the guru brokered peace between Raja Ram Singh and the Ahom ruler Raja Chakradhwaj Singha (Supangmung). Whilst Guru Tegh Bahadur was in Dhaka, Raja Ram Singh petitioned that the Akal Sena assist him in his crushing of a rebellion led by King Chakradhwaj Singha of the Ahom Kingdom in Kamrup (located in Assam) in north-eastern India. The Guru agreed to the request because he had plans to visit that region anyways to rebuild a monument of Guru Nanak's udasi (travel tour) to the area. The Guru and his forces reached the region in February 1669. Whilst stationed in Dhubri, Kamrup near the bank of a river, an encampment of the Akal Sena with Guru Tegh Bahadur had come under attack from the other side of the river by local Assamese forces. The Sikhs were able to defeat the enemy using archery. Afterwards, the Guru made peace with the locals after the latter informed him that they were rebelling to resist the conquests of the Mughal empire and to protect their sovereignty. Later-on, the Ahom king honoured the Guru at the Kamakhya shrine after Guru Tegh Bahadur brokered peace between the imperial Mughal army under the command of Raja Ram Singh and the local Ahom resistance. It is further believed that Tegh Bahadur established a Sikh shrine at Dhubri in Goalpara district, known locally as Dumdume Gurdwara, at the location of Guru Nanak's previous visit. Some Sikhs remained in Assam to tend to the shrines. Furthermore, as per legend a local figure named Raja Ram was blessed with a son named Rattan Rai by Guru Tegh Bahadur, with this son later gifting Guru Gobind Singh various things, including an elephant.

=== Mercenaries and militia ===
Sikhism has been present in Assam for over 200 years. In the 18th century, some Sikh and Punjabi mercenaries resided at the Sikh shrines in the region, with them adopting the local culture and language. The Axomiya Sikhs of Nagaon district may be descended from them. During the Dundiya rebellion of the early 1790s, some Sikhs, possibly from northern Bihar or descended from Sikhs who remained in Assam to tend to shrines, participated in the barkandaze forces, which partially consisted of upcountry militamen of Punjabi and Hindustani-origin. According to Rajanikanta Bordoloi, the Assamese figure Haradatta Chaudhuri hired 300 Punjabis for his barkandaze force, supplying them food rations and paying them a monthly salary. However, these barkandaz later joined the Ahoms for better pay. The barkandaz Sikhs were inducted into the Ahom Army as a militia, and were given land for their service, with them possibly being deployed at the settlement of Raha near the tribal frontier in the Raha Chaki as per oral history. These Sikhs lost touch with their homeland and underwent a process of Assamization, marrying local Assamese women.

The community in the villages of Nagaon district claims to trace its origins to Sikh soldiers sent by the Sikh Empire to support the Ahom ruler Chandrakanta Simha in 1820, fighting in 1823 at the Battle of Hadirachaki against invading Burmese forces. According to the Assamese Sikh legend, the Sikh commander of these soldiers (reputably named Bir Chaitanya Singh), whose battalion numbered around five-hundred was killed and the surviving men travelled with his widow (known only as mata-ji) to the rivulet of Titaimori Suti, where they settled initially at Chaparmukh village. They later settled in the villages of Chaparmukh and Barkola, adopting a life of agriculture. According to Himadri Banerjee, these men were not Punjabi Sikhs but rather local Assamese Sikhs from the earlier barkandaze, as they had extensive knowledge of the local geography and hydrology. According to Banerjee, during the Burmese invasion, the Ahomese authorities shifted the Sikh barkandaz from Raha to Hadirachaki, where they were defeated and after returned to Chaparmukh, where their families were situated. Sikh men married local Assamese women.

In 1826, the British annexed Assam and disbanded the barkandaze forces, pushing the local Sikhs who had served in it into an agricultural lifestyle. By the early 20th century, these Assamese Sikh rural dwellers had moved to higher-ground and established Barkola, their second settlement. Later, they lived in Hatipara and Lanka.

=== Arrival and settlement of Punjabi Sikhs ===
During British-rule, Punjabi Sikh migrants from Punjab settled in Assam due to the tea-plantations and increased accessibility due to the establishment of the Assam-Bengal Railways in the early 20th century. These Punjabi Sikh settlers, initially mostly Ramgarhias, first established themselves in Guwahati and later in Margherita. The Ramgarhia pioneers engaged in work related to the railways, as the century progressed they were joined by Jatt Sikhs and Dalit Sikhs. The first Punjabi Sikhs to arrive were a small number travelling through Guwahati on their way to Shillong in the late 19th century. The first station-master of the train station of Guwahati was a Punjabi Sikh man named Alla Singh, whom was a Ramgarhia. Alla Singh sheltered other Sikhs in his residence and helped establish a Sikh gurdwara in Guwahati in 1902, originally a tin-sheet structure until it was rebuilt with concrete in 1925–26, with it being named Ramgarhia Sabha. Post-1918, the British employed the Ramgarhia Sikhs in the area to expand the railway infrastructure to Central and Upper Assam from Guwahati, such as to Mariani. In 1922, Sundar Singh Bamra, another Ramgarhia Sikh, founded a gurdwara on railway land. Aside from railway work, the Ramgarhia Sikhs also found employment in the Assam Oil Company, which led them to going as remote as Digboi in Upper Assam. In 1926, a Ramgarhia gurdwara was established in Digboi while in 1935, another one was established in Jorhat, associated with tea-production. Many Ramgarhia Sikhs from the Gurdaspur district of Punjab would settle in Jorhat, where they worked a variety of jobs (such as in the railways, construction, oil, or transportation), such as Sohan Singh and Tehal Singh, whom were thekedars (construction contractors). Other prominent thekedars of the community were Mohan Singh Hadiabadi of Dibrugarh, Sohan Singh of Jorhat, Kishen Singh of Guwahati, and Sundar Singh of Digboi. The growing timber-trade brought the Punjabi Sikhs to Dibrugarh (1930) and Tinsukia (1932), while settlement in Margherita was caused by other opportunities. Due to the skilled-labour and artisanry of the Ramgarhia Sikhs, they became prosperous and many went from mistris to thekedars, and there was a strong sense of community and caste-solidarity amongst the Ramgarhia Sikhs of Assam. Literary works by Assamese Hindus declared Assamese Sikhs as "predators" and "outsiders" to the Brahmaputra Valley.

The Singh Sabha reformers were not aware of the existence of the Assamese Sikhs, thus they were unaffected by the religious and social reforms. Some Assamese Sikhs were followers of the Gandhian Movement in the 1920s and beyond, such as Atma Singh Chhetri, Ranjit Singh, Phula Singh Chhetri, Kamal Singh, Phatik Singh, Mahatab Singh, and Janga Singh. Protests were held, national schools were supported, the usage of khadi was promoted, with there being imprisonments of some Assamese Sikhs. In the 1930s and 1940s, Assamese Sikhs gradually shifted their support away from Gandhite movement out of concerns of being marginalized by Bengali Muslim peasant settlers in the region. After this, Assamese Sikhs and Assamese Hindus formed closer ties due to the ethnic issue regarding Bengali Muslims. Eventually, the Assamese Sikh Association was formed in 1939 with Jog Singh as its general-secretary and Lal Singh as its president (with the latter being a domiciled Punjabi Sikh). Local Sikhs were recruited during the Second World War.

=== Post-independence ===
During the Assam movement (1979–1985), Assamese Sikhs participated in the protests of the Asom Sahitya Sabha, despite the organization grouping "Punjabis" among the "illegal foreigners", which the Assamese Sikhs did not know if the label included them or not. In-order to assert their Assamese-ness and dissociate themselves from being viewed as Punjabis, the Assamese Sikhs founded the Asomiya Sikh Santha in 1980, which promoted literature in the local language. Due to these factors, the relations between local Assamese Sikhs and Punjabi Sikhs in Assam deteriorated, when they had initially been friendly in the early 20th century. A group of local Assamese Sikhs from the Nagaon villages made a pilgrimage trip to the Golden Temple in Amritsar in March 2009.

== Occupation, culture, and religiosity ==
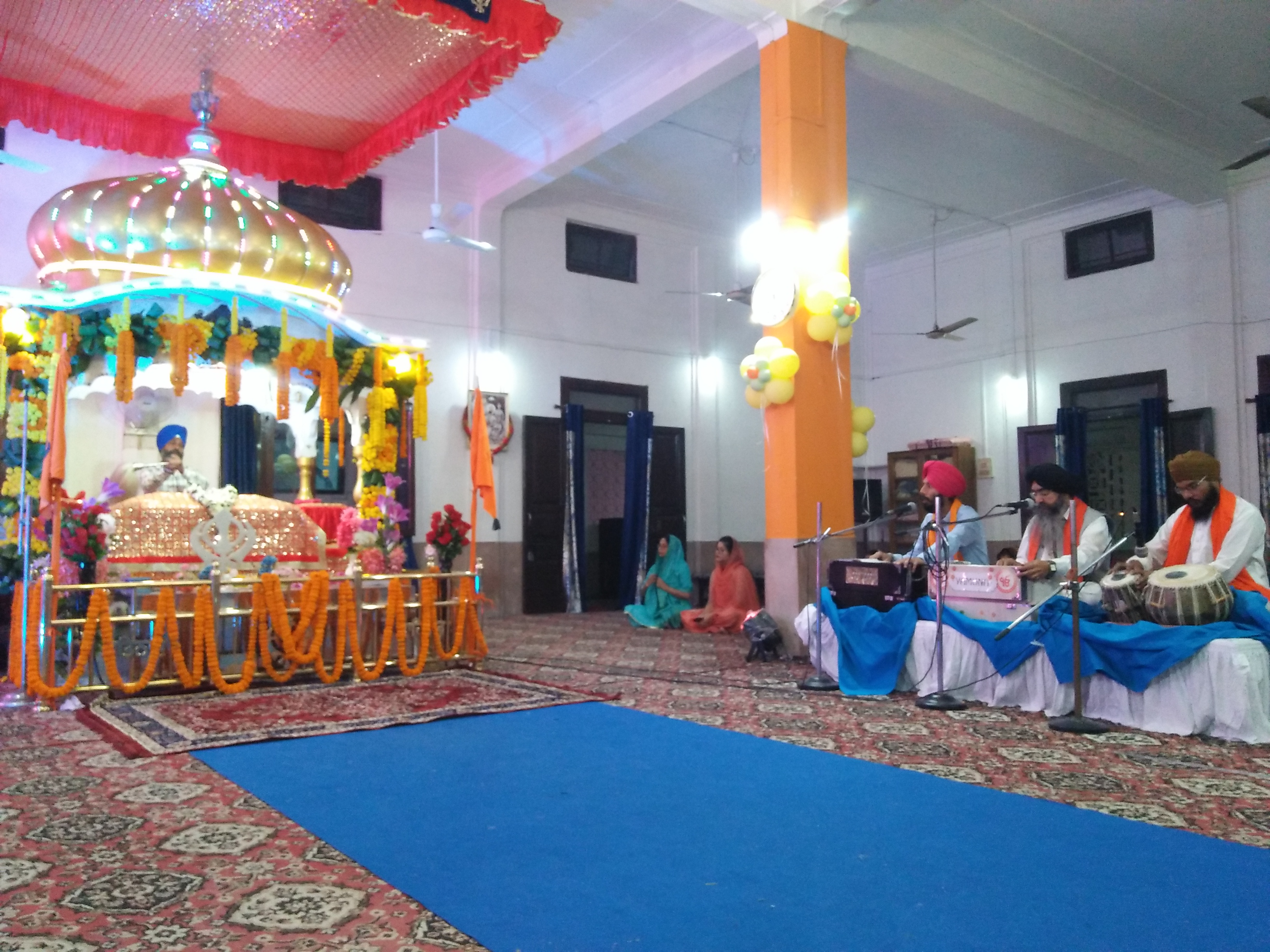
Interior of Shri Guru Singh Sabha Gurdwara, Dibrugarh during Guru Nanakdev Jayanti, 2020

The Assamese Sikhs can be divided into two groups: those from the Nagaon villages (who are local Assamese Sikhs) and the other from the different urban centers of Assam (typically Punjabi Sikhs). Assamese Sikhs are generally poorer and tend to work in agriculture whilst Punjabi Sikhs in Assam usually work in more technical positions and are more affluent. Assamese Sikhs of Nagaon district in the 19th century originally existed as landless peasants an tenants holding poor-quality jungle land. They offered their services to more affluent section of the agricultural society in-exchange for being allowed to borrow livestock. It was only in the early 20th century that they began to seek additional cultivable holdings.

Assamese Sikhs follow the Sikh religion and celebrate Sikh festivals as they also celebrate cultural festivals such as Magh Bihu and wear traditional Assamese dress. Their language is the Assamese language. They do not speak the Punjabi language and do not read the Guru Granth Sahib in its original language. They adhere strictly to the 5Ks. Some of them are ignorant of the rahit. Their form of the Sikh religion is influenced by Assamese Vaishnavism. They also believe in superstitions, such as bhutpret. Another quirk is they avoid ploughing during certain days of the year. Their religious space was the namghar, rather than being called gurdwara. The architecture of their gurdwaras, such as the first known one at Chaparmukh (originally a thatched house and later converted into a permanent structure in the 20th century), also are unique and influenced by Assamese architecture. At the Mataji Gurdwara in Chaparmukh, they observed gurpurbs in a characteristically Assamese manner.

== Demographics ==
As per the 2011 census, 20,672 Sikhs reside in Assam, constituting 0.07% of the total population of Assam. The 2001 census of India recorded 22,519 Sikhs residing in Assam. In 2003, it was reported in The Tribune that out of the 11,000 Sikh residents in Assam, 4,000 of them are local Assamese Sikhs. Assamese Sikhs can be found residing in the villages of Barkola, Zhaparmukh, Lanka, and Hatipara in Nagaon district.

The Sikhs outside Punjab (incl. Assam) can be divided into three main groups: Jatt Sikhs descended from peasants, Khatri Sikhs descended from traders, and local Sikh groups. Since 1950, around 220,000 Punjabi Sikhs migrated to and settled in other states of India. However, these Punjabi Sikh migrants are distinguishable from the autochthonous community of Sikhs, known as Axomiya Sikhs, who descend from earlier Sikhs from previous centuries who indigenized to Assamese culture and adopted the local language.

== Gurdwaras in Assam ==
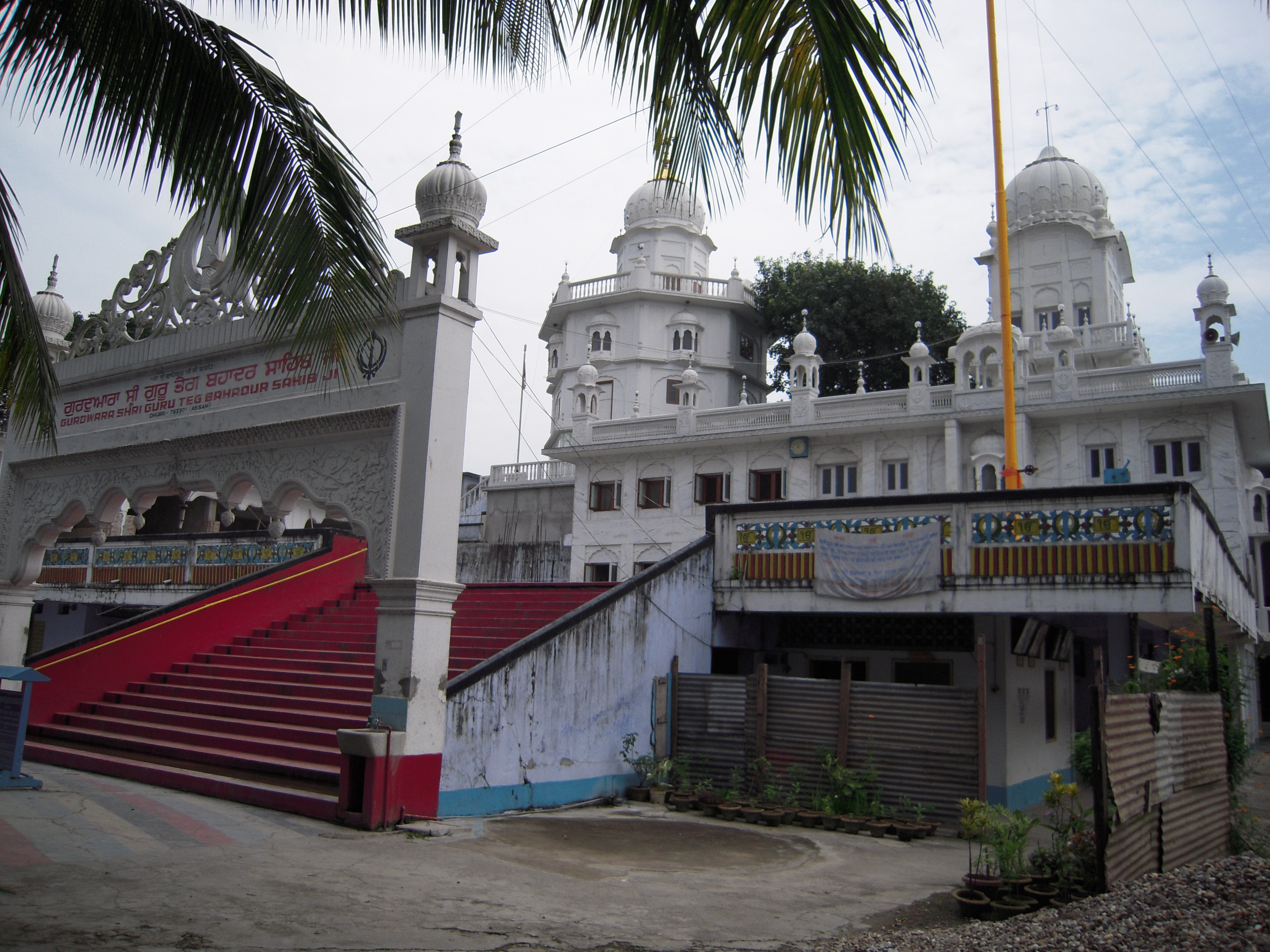
Gurdwara Sri Guru Tegh Bahadur Sahib, Dhubri

Some local gurdwaras of Assam are:

- Gurdwara Sri Guru Tegh Bahadur Sahib
- Mataji Gurdwara, Chaparmukh

== Popular culture ==
A Sikh character named Kumedan Singh features in the novel Padumkuari, (1891), with the Sikh character being portrayed as a villain, traitor, and foreigner. Sailadhar Rajkhowa also wrote a poem named Pashan Pratima ("stone images") that involve Sikh characters, such as Chaitanya Singh being loved by two girls named Fullara and Chatala, which improved the status of Sikhs in Assam. Assamese author M. R. Goswami wrote a novelette Tej aru Dhulire Dhusarit Pristha (1994) on the anti-Sikh riots of 1984.
