= Dastar bunga =

Sikh turban style

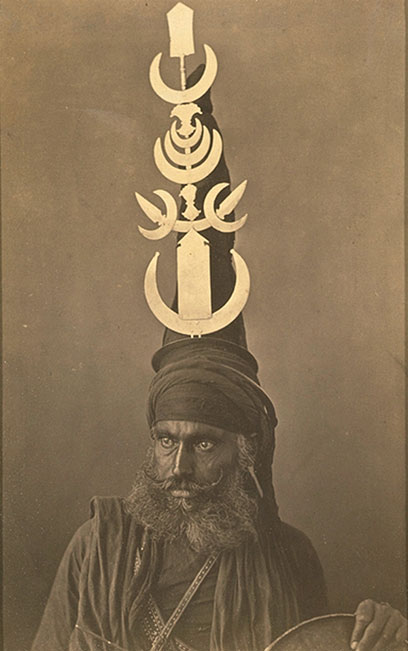
A Nihang Sikh in the 1860s with a characteristically elaborate turban

Dastar bunga, or "towering fortress", also known as a Guja, is a style of turban used by a specific sect within the Sikhs, the Akali Nihangs (Immortal Crocodiles). As an essential part of their faith the warriors used the turban as a store for their expansive range of weapons.

"Their turban was tied in a unique way, which with time, was established as a norm. Its method and style of tying was not aimed towards pleasing the Almighty, but was in accordance with the rank. The first form of the turban of the Singhs had a thick bamboo stick in the centre and was raised to a measure of nine inches or as long as a hand. And by circling step by step around the bamboo stick, that turban became similar to a tapering tube. When the last section of the turban reached the end of the wooden stick, abreast with the tip of the stick, a part, to the measure of a hand, was left flying loose. While riding or on foot, the flying movement of the loose end of the turban was like a flag, demonstrating their magnificence." Mufti 'Ali ud-Din, Ibratnamah (1854), 1:364-66.

== Personification ==
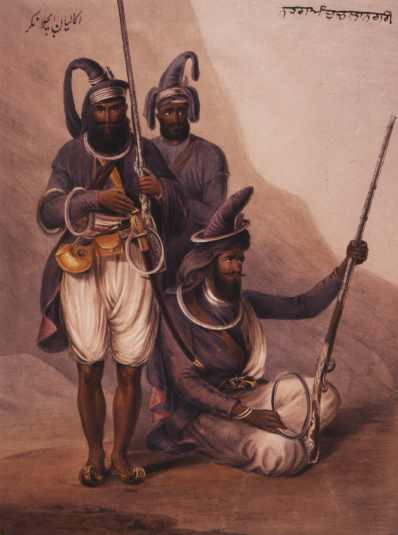
Sikhs with chakrams, inscribed "Nihang Abchal Nagar" (Nihang from Hazur Sahib), 1844

The dark blue tunic (chola) and turban (dumalla) surmounted with quoit and dagger were first worn in 1699 at the time of the first Khalsa initiation ceremony of the double-edged sword (khanda-pahul). Next came the turban-flag (farra or farla), which was introduced by Guru Gobind Singh in 1702 during a clash with a Rajput hill king in the vicinity of Anandpur. The Khalsa's battle standard was cut down when its bearer, Akali Man Singh Nihang, fell wounded. Henceforth, the Guru decided that the dark blue flag should be worn as a part of Man Singh's turban, fluttering from its peak for as long as its bearer had life in him. It is said that the full magnificence of the Akal-Nihang uniform emerged the following year.

Guru Gobind Singh set a challenge to his gathered Khalsa warriors to reveal to him Maha Kal (Great Death). After a while, his youngest son, four–year–old Fateh Singh entered the court in dark blue apparel. On his head was bound a large dark blue 'turban fortress' (dastar bunga) intricately decorated with an array of sharpened steel daggers as well as a series of quoits and crescents descending in size. A piece of blue cloth—the farla—was distinctively tied so that it sprouted from the turban's apex.

Fateh Singh's manner was fiercer even than that of seasoned Akali-Nihangs such as his mentor, Man Singh. As he stood broad–chested, his eyes blood–red with effortful rage, he inspired awe as well as gentle laughter. With folded hands, the Guru bowed reverentially in front of the child. When his perplexed warriors asked the reason for doing so, the Guru explained that he had paid his respect not merely to his son but to the true personification of Maha Kal as worn by the inspired child. The Guru declared that the uniform thus revealed was eminently suitable for the Akali-Nihangs to adopt. It was then that the Singhs also bowed to Fateh Singh. Since he possessed a spirit most like Maha Kal, Baba Fateh Singh (as he came to be known) was acknowledged as the foremost Akali-Nihang Singh.

== Origin ==
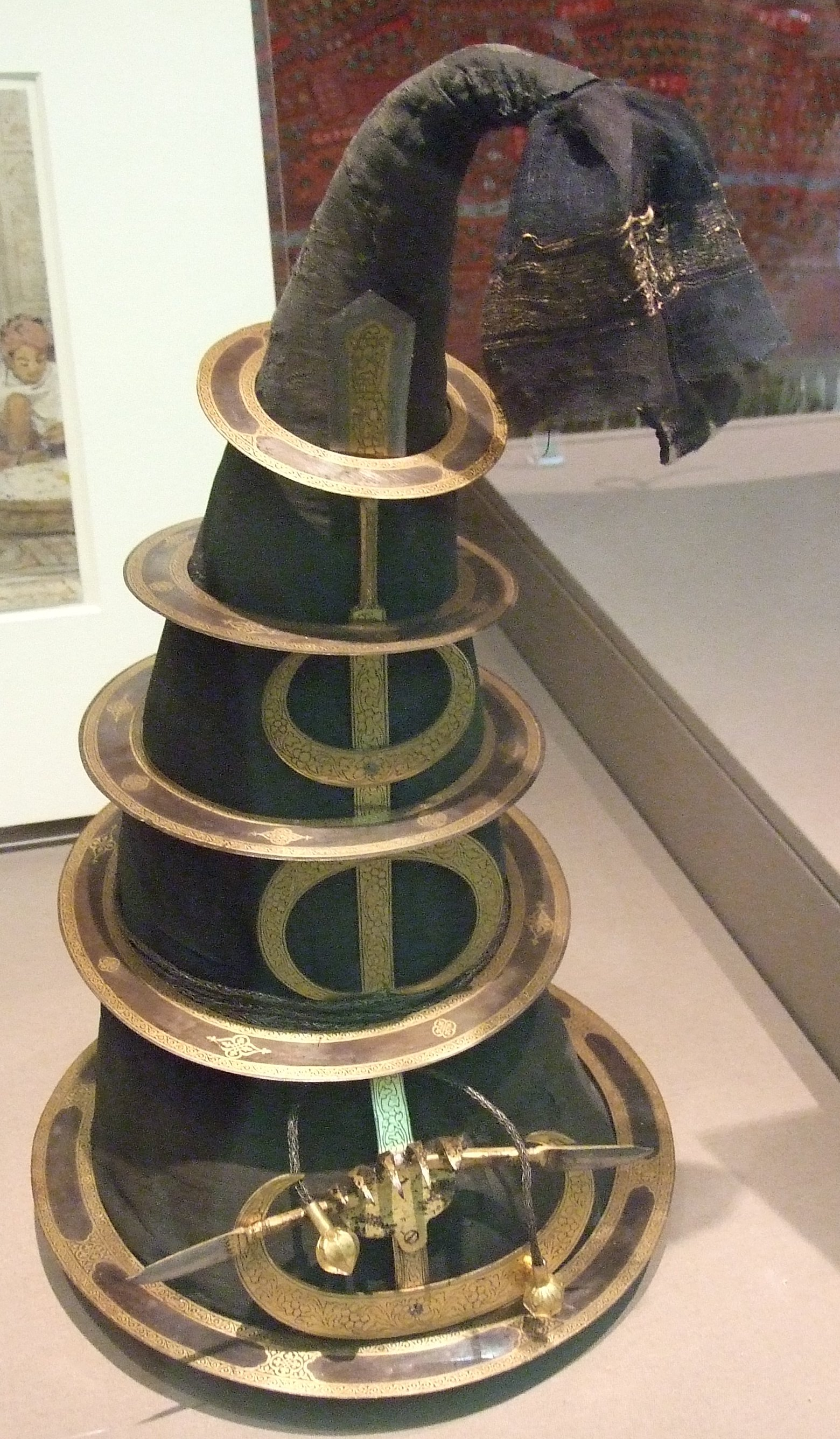
Akali Turban Cotton over a wicker frame, Steel overlaid with gold. Lahore. Mid-19th century. "A tall conical turban provided convenient transportation for a number of sharp steel quoits - edged weapons hurled to lethal effect by the practised hand of the Akalis."

"First introduced by Akali Naina Singh Nihang, this example of the towering turban bristles with miniature blades and a series of war quoits made from brightly polished, razor-sharp steel. The totemic gajgah bound at the front is secured with braided steel wire (tora) and the blue turban cloth; this is meant to cover the stem, leaving only the topmost double-edged dagger or bhagauti and multiple crescents visible. Literally 'grappler of elephants', the gajgah is thought to have been worn in ancient times as an emblem of distinction by powerful warriors, like Bhim of the epic Mahabharat fame, who were capable of single-handedly defeating war elephants. The gajgah is also intimately connected with Shiv's trident, an instrument of both destruction and grace. Its series of crescents climb towards the mountain like peak out of which emerges the flag (farla), representing the Khalsa's battle standard. To achieve this effect, an under-turban (keski) was twisted around the long hair and carefully wound to give the peaked appearance with the end forming the farla. To provide thickness and support at the base a second turban was tied. Quoits and braided wire secured everything in place.

The farla was introduced in 1702 after Guru Gobind Singh saw the Khalsa's standard cut down in the thick of battle. He was prompted to tie the flag in the turban of his standard bearer, Akali Man Singh Nihang. Henceforth, a wearer of the farla held a position of utmost respect amongst the Khalsa, so much so that it became the supreme insignia of the warrior brotherhood. Only a Nihang warrior of the Akali rank was permitted to display this mark of the Guru's honour."

== Etymology ==
The Dastar Bungha consists of a number of weapons some of which are listed below.

The word dumalla is a term given to the turban worn by Nihangs that combines a small under-turban (*keski*) and a large over-turban (*dastar*); thought to have been adopted by Sikhs in the times of Guru Har Gobind.

The Bungha directly translate to a Tower, fort or residence; a structure specially attached to a Sikh shrine to house pilgrims that also served as a seat of classical learning, a place where weapons are stored.

Nihang has various meanings including 'sword', 'without care for life or death', and 'alligator'. All Sikhs who were willing to fight under Guru Gobind Singh were called Nihangs, and collectively they were known as the 'ladlian fauja'. Nihang was the synonymous term used for the Akalis. They are now considered by some a sect of Sikhism.

An Akali is a staunch believer in 'Akal', the Timeless One; an 'Immortal'. The original Sikh warriors raised by Guru Hargobind at the 'Akal Takht'. They are also known as Akali Nihangs and are distinguishable by the blue dress, weaponry and speech of Guru Gobind Singh's times, which they have always maintained.

A Farla worn by some Akalis it signifies the rank of general amongst the Nihangs, dependent on rank represents a 'Flag'. The loose cloth that comes out of the top of the Akali Nihang turban, the dastaar boonga.

== Weapons and ornaments ==
- Quoits in ascending order (Chakar)
- Elephant grapler (Gajgah)
- Wrapping cord (Tora)
- Bagh Nakha (tiger claws)
- Katar also known as a push dagger
- Crescent (Adh chand)
- Chainmail covering the Keski but under the Dastaar
- A Dhal or shield
- Spear tip usually Tir or Nangini Barcha
- Pharla or turla and Shamla
- Small curved daggers at least 10 to 15 ones
- Two Kirpans representing Miri-Piri
- Double-edged sword (Khanda)
- Single-edged dagger (Bhagauti)
- Rattray badge (Specific to Rattray's battalion)

== Known examples ==
List of physical examples of the Dastar Bunga and gajgah's within the UK:

- V&A Dastar Bhunga (London)
- BM Dastar Bhunga (London)
- Royal Armouries (Leeds)
- Stonyhurst College, UK – gajgah wrapped in turban cloth (Lancashire)
- Museum of Archaeology and Anthropology Gajgah (search under "Sikh emblem" in catalogue), (Downing Street, Cambridge)
- Toor private collection (Gajgah)

== See also ==
- Nihang
- Turban
- Sikh
- Rumāl
- Patka
- Thatha
