= Turban training centre =

Institutes which trains Sikhs in tying Dastar

Turban training centre or turban tying centre or dastar academy (Punjabi: ਦਸਤਾਰ ਸਿਖਲਾਈ ਕੇਂਦਰ, Hindi: दस्तार सिखलाई केंद्र, Urdu: پگڑی تربیتی مرکز) are training institutes opened by professionals, who train Sikhs in tying dastar on their heads. They also tie dastar for those people who do not know how to tie a turban, charging fees. Their regular clients include industrialists, businessmen, doctors, engineers, transporters and students.

Turban training centers have opened mostly in main cities of Punjab, such as Ludhiana, Jalandhar, Bathinda, Patiala, Amritsar, Chamkaur, Moga and in some Delhi and Haryana cities too. Amritdhari male Sikhs cover their hair with a turban, while Amritdhari female Sikhs may also do so. However, the trend of wearing turbans has declined due to fashion, glamour and youngsters preferring to keep cut hair and a clean shaved face. Regional Punjabi film stars and Punjabi music icons such as Inderjit Nikku, Diljit Dosanjh, Lehmber Hussainpuri, Ravinder Grewal, Ammy Virk, Ranjit Bawa, Sidhu Moose Wala, Tarsem Jassar, Shubh, Kulbir Jhinjher, Surjit Bindrakhia, and Himmat Sandhu who always wear pagg in their films and music videos, have inspired Sikh youths to wear turbans with various new styles.

Some Sikh elites in the diaspora have also hosted turban-tying events at universities in North America to raise awareness about the Sikh headwear.

== See also ==
- Kacchera
- Kara
- Patka
- Rumal
- Salai (needle)
- Thatha
