= Dastar =

Turban worn by Sikhs

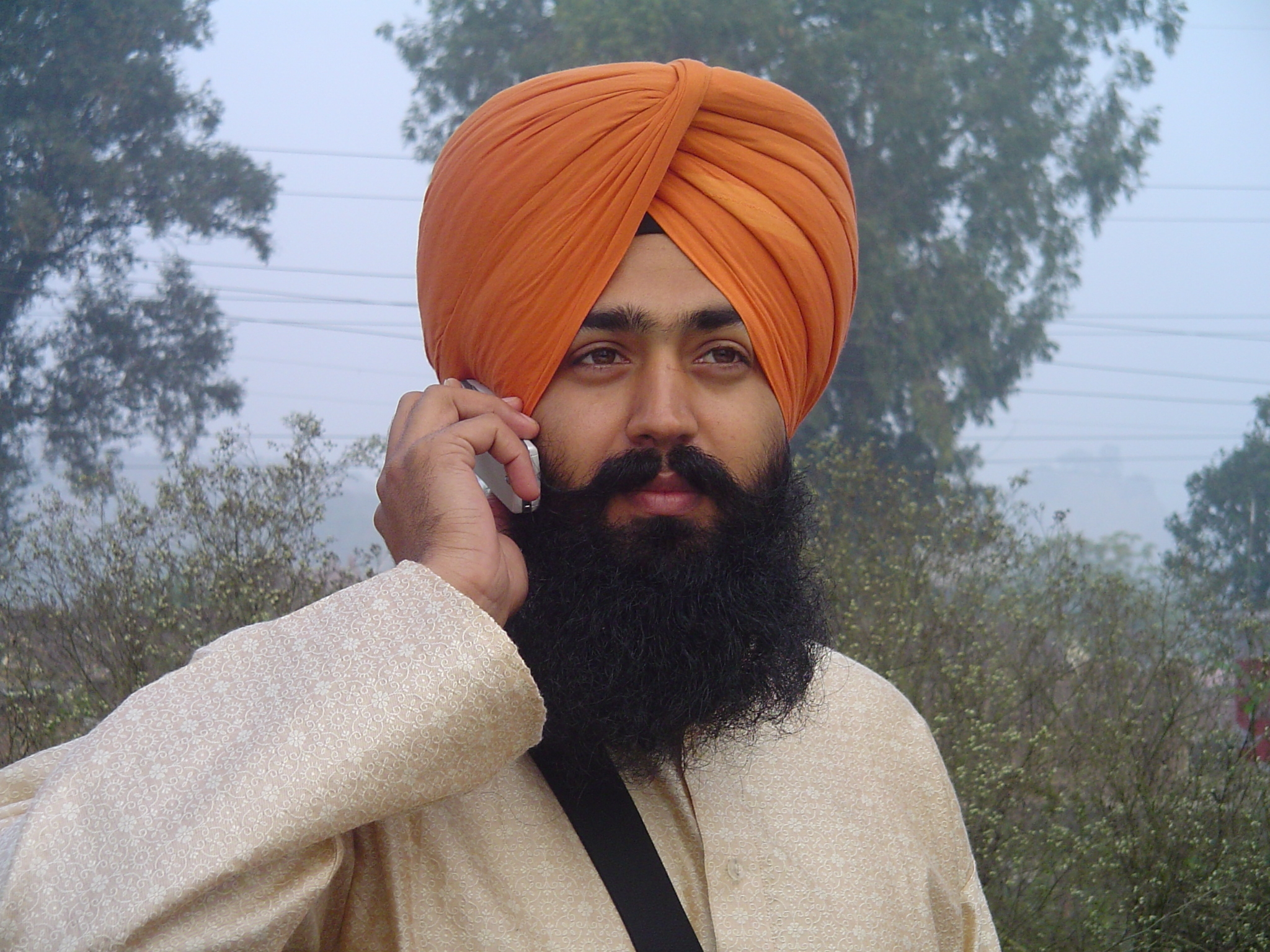
Sikh man wearing a dastar or pagg

A dastār (Note: Punjabi: ਦਸਤਾਰ/دستار, from Persian: دستار; dast or "hand" with the agentive suffix -ār; also known as a ਪੱਗ pug, pagg or pugg or ਪੱਗੜੀ pagaṛī in Punjabi) is an item of headwear associated with Sikhism and Sikh culture. The word is loaned from Persian through Punjabi. In Persian, the word dastār can refer to any kind of turban and replaced the original word for turban, dolband (دلبند), from which the English word is derived.

Among the Sikhs, the dastār is an article of faith that represents equality, honour, self-respect, courage, spirituality, and piety. The Khalsa Sikh men and women, who keep the Five Ks, wear the turban to cover their long, uncut hair (kesh). The Sikhs regard the dastār as an important part of the unique Sikh identity. After the ninth Sikh Guru, Tegh Bahadur, was sentenced to death by the Mughal emperor Aurangzeb, Guru Gobind Singh, the tenth Sikh Guru created the Khalsa and gave five articles of faith, one of which is unshorn hair, which the dastār covers.

== Etymology and terminology ==
Dastar derives from the Persian word dulband via the Turkic word tarbūsh, referring to headwear tied with hands or a long scarf head-wrapping. Pag comes from the Sanskrit word Pak or Puk, referring to white or grey hair and therefore signifying wisdom. Aside from Dastar or Pag, other related terms used to refer to turban headwear in Punjabi include Chira, Safa, Siropa, Madhasa, Keski and Parna.

== History ==
=== Background ===
Turbans have a long history in the Indian subcontinent and the Middle East, with evidence of its wearing in prehistoric and ancient times. It was associated with high-culture, spirituality, and royalty. The specific size, material, and style of the turban denoted rank and position. By the 11th century, the wearing of turbans had become popularized amongst the commoners. From the 12th century onward, Muslims introduced stylistic changes to the turbans worn due to their wearing of head-caps. Rattan Singh Jaggi traces the popularization of the turban in the Punjab to the Muslims. The Mughal emperor Akbar was a advocate of the turban and replaced the Mughlai style for the Hindustani style of turban, which promoted the wearing of the turban amongst Hindus. The turban came to have a special place amongst the Sikhs.

=== Sikh period ===
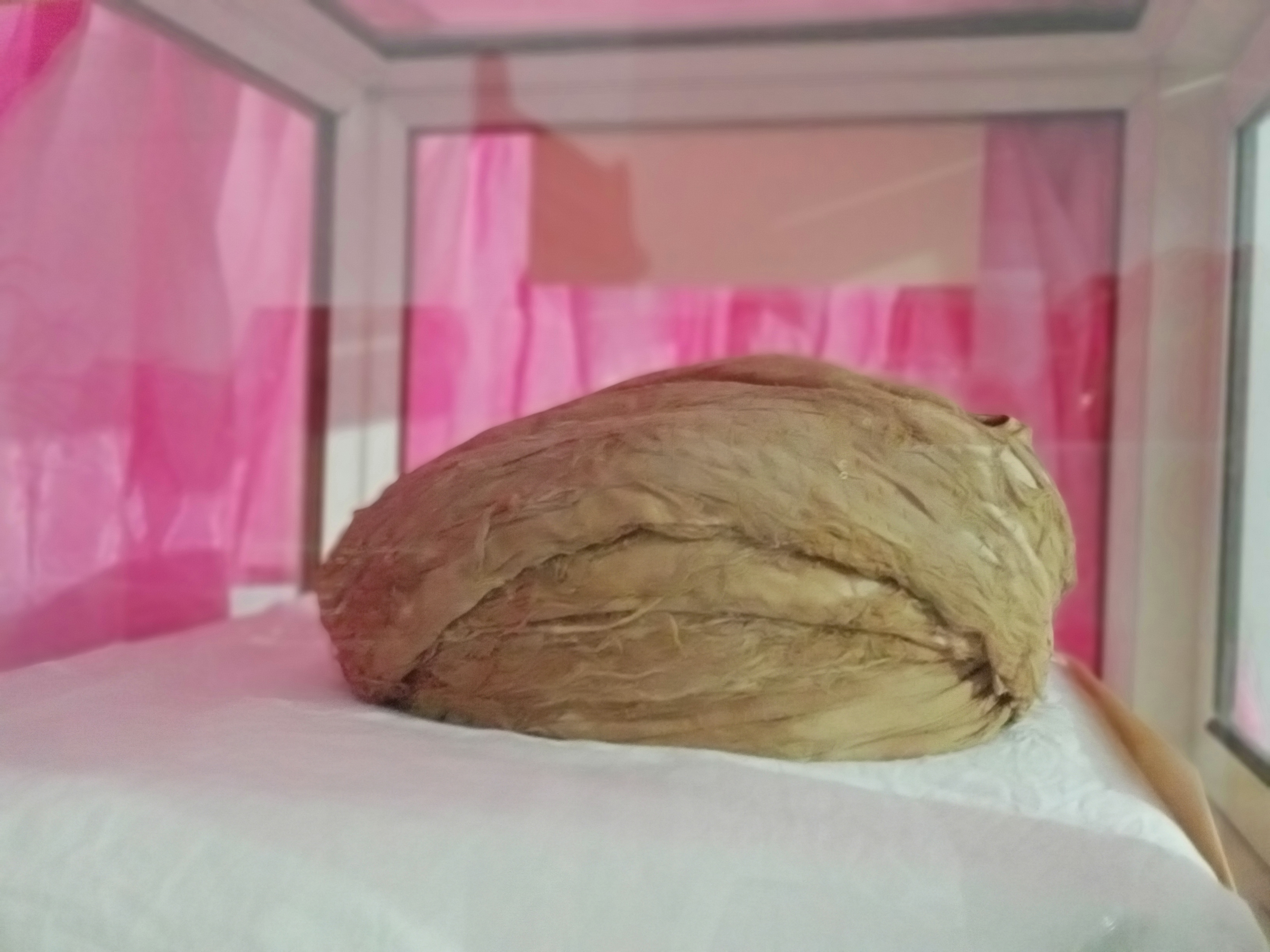
Preserved Dastar relic of Guru Gobind Singh

The dastār has been an important part of the Sikh religion since the time of the first guru, Guru Nanak who honoured Guru Angad, and who in-turn honoured Guru Amar Das with a special dastār when he was declared the next guru. When Guru Ram Das died, Guru Arjan was honoured with the dastār of guruship. Guru Arjan stated in the Guru Granth Sahib (ang 1084) that turbans were an ideal part of a true human's appearance. At Paonta Sahib, there is a location where it is believed Guru Gobind Singh would tie his turban at.

Marne di pag Pirthiye badhi. Guriyaee pag Arjan Ladhi

Guru Gobind Singh, the last human Sikh Guru, wrote:

Kangha dono vaqt kar, paag chune kar bandhai. ("Comb your hair twice a day and tie your turban carefully, turn by turn.")

Rattan Singh Bhangu, one of the earliest Sikh historians, wrote in Sri Gur Panth Parkash:

Doi vele utth bandhyo dastare, pahar aatth rakhyo shastar sambhare. Kesan ki kijo pritpal, nah(i) ustran se katyo vaal. ("Tie your dastār twice a day and wear shaster (weapons to protect dharma), and keep them with care, 24 hours a day. Take good care of your hair. Do not cut your hair by blade.)"

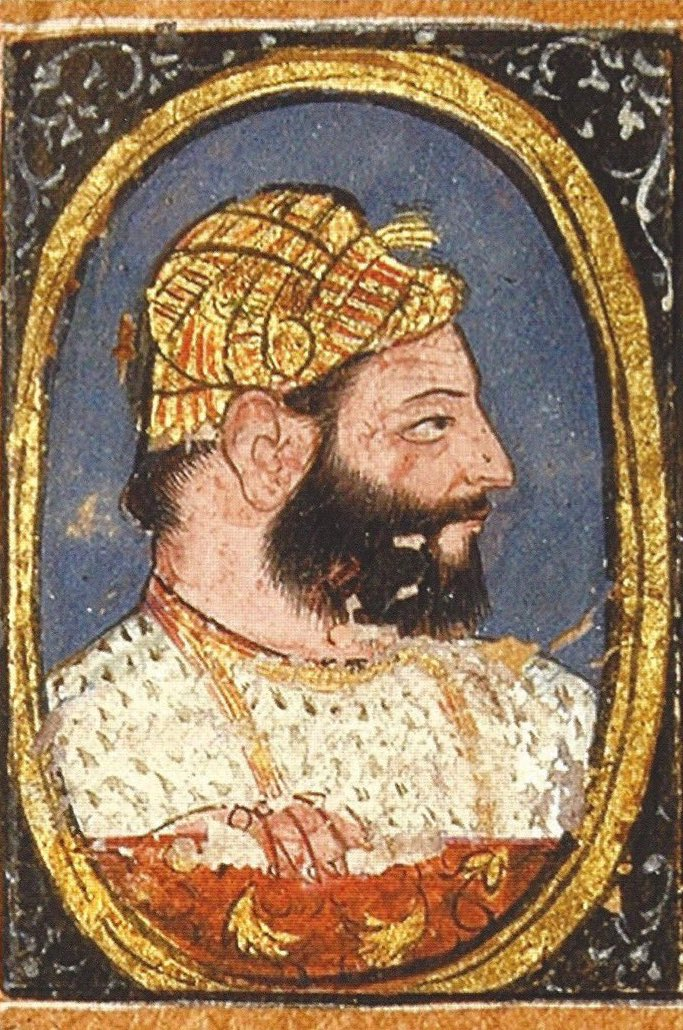
Contemporary or near-contemporary painting of Guru Hargobind

According to Jvala Singh, the seli topi was worn by the first five Sikh gurus rather than a turban. It was only during the period of the sixth Sikh guru, Guru Hargobind, that the turban gained prominence amongst the Sikhs. Guru Hargobind tied a turban rather than donning the traditional seli topi of the predecessory gurus. Guru Hargobind's promotion of the turban may have been to assert Sikh's equal-footing with the Mughal authority of the era. Meanwhile, Jaggi claims that all of the Sikh gurus wore the turban. Later, the practice of tying a turban became fully tied to Sikhs with the formalization of the Khalsa order by Guru Gobind Singh in 1699, with turbans coming to be part of the male Sikh form (sarūp) due to its association with maintaining kesh, one of the 5Ks. The wearing of a cap or hat (ṭopī) became forbidden amongst the Sikh orthodoxy, being viewed as a mark of subjugation while the turban is seen as a sign of sovereignty.

The turban is not one of the five Ks mandated in mainstream Sikhism, rather it has become a tool to help manage one of the actual five Ks, kesh (uncut hair). Rather, the turban was a male-signifier of Sikh identity. As per Purnima Dhava, respect and prestige in 18th century Punjab was tied to both women and turbans, where alliances were made through the exchanging of turbans and offering their womenfolk (daughters) to be wed. Ceremonies associated with the Sikh turban were also male-gendered, such as the turban tying ceremony, known as the Rasam Pagri or Rasam Dastar, when a patriarch dies and his eldest son takes over the familial responsibilities by tying a turban in front of others. Furthermore, during Sikh wedding ceremonies, such as the Anand Karaj, the male groom will wear a turban, regardless if he does so in his regular life or not.

The practice of Sikh women wearing turbans was not historically common. Instead, women combed their hair downward and covered it with a type of scarf (known as a chunni), although some Nihang women wore turbans.

=== Colonial era ===
Historically in Punjabi society, males from all religious and caste backgrounds wore turbans, head-dresses, or caps. However, due to the influence of Western culture with the onset of British-rule, the traditional headwear of the region began experiencing a decline in usage and observation. Despite this decline, the turban is still symbolically important for all religious communities, such as in regards to marriage, funeral, and wrestling customs. This decline of tradition headwear was not as strong amongst the Sikhs, as turbans are religiously mandated for them as part of their uniform (accompanied by uncut hair) rather than merely being a socio-cultural practice, thus turbans are now closely tied with Sikhs, when in the past it was more of a pan-Punjabi practice. A popular nationalist chant of the colonial-period was Pagri Sambhal Jatta (pagṛī sambhāl jaṭṭā, ਪਗੜੀ ਸੰਭਾਲ ਜੱਟਾ).

The appearance of Sikh men, including their turban styles, was later standardized during the Singh Sabha movement and the participation of Sikhs in the British Indian military and polices, which had a formulated uniform policy. The practice of wearing a fifty under the turban was adopted during the British colonial period by Sikh soldiers, named as such because the mini turban worn under the main turban was 2.5 metres as opposed to 5 metres, thus 50% the length. During the World Wars, Sikh soldiers serving in the British Indian Army were warned about potentially suffering from high-rates of casualties if they did not adopt steel-helmets (loh-ṭop), however Sikh soldiers preferred to forgo head protection in favour of wearing their turban alone, despite colonial officials warning about issues with pensions as a result. During the wars, around 83,055 turbaned Sikh men were killed while 109,045 were injured.

=== Present ===
The majority of Sikh men in the present-era no longer wear a turban. There has been a shift away from turbans being an everyday headwear to one that is worn during special occasions only. There also is decreasing knowledge and education on how to tie a turban. There have been a number of efforts to promote the wearing of turbans, such as turban-tying compeitions held by gurdwara committees (usually during Vaisakhi) and the efforts of the Akal Purakh Ki Fauj, who hold the Turban Pride Day in April, the sending of volunteers to schools to teach turban-tying, and the usage of the software Smart Turban to assist people trying to find a turban style and colour that suits them. An app called Turbanizer was developed by Ash Singh to help visualize oneself in a turban. Starting in 2005, the Mr. Singh International pageant features turbaned Sikh men. Turban-training centres have also been established in various localities in India. Popular media (including films, exhibitions, and documentaries) are also promoting the turban.

Furthermore, Sikh turban helmets have been devised but in some legal jurisdictions Sikhs have an exemption from wearing certain protective headgear. This has caused legal issues (especially pertinent to diasporic Sikhs, such as in the private and public sector and regarding motorcycles) but there is a trend toward permitting Sikh exemptions in legal systems, such as in the United Kingdom and Canada.

== Significance ==
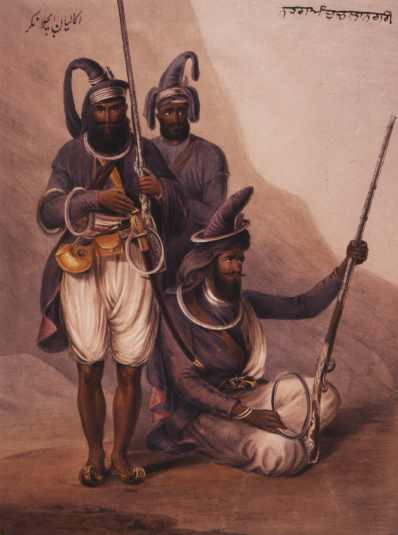
Nihang Abchal Nagar (Nihangs from Hazur Sahib), 1844. Shows turban-wearing Sikh soldiers with chakrams.

Turbans are mentioned within the Guru Granth Sahib. In the Khalsa society, the turban signifies many virtues:

=== Sayings ===
There are many Punjabi idioms and proverbs that describe how important a dastār is in Sikh's lives, these sayings show the veneration that turbans have in Sikh society. Bhai Gurdas wrote:

"Tthande khuhu naike pag visar(i) aya sir(i) nangai

Ghar vich ranna(n) kamlia(n) dhussi liti dekh(i) kudhange" ("A man, after taking a bath at the well during winter time, forgot his dastār at the well and came home bareheaded.

When the women saw him at home without a dastār, they thought someone had died and they started to cry.")

Other idioms that show this veneration include:

- pagg dī lāj rakkhṇā, "to maintain the honour of the turban", refers to proper social conduct
- pagg lāhuṇā or pagg latth jāṇī, "to knock off the turban", refers to an insult
- pag vaṭāuṇā or pagg vaṭṭ yār, "to exchange turbans", refers to fraternal bonds being formed
- pagṛī bannhṇā, refers to tying of a turban

=== Uniform of Sikhism ===
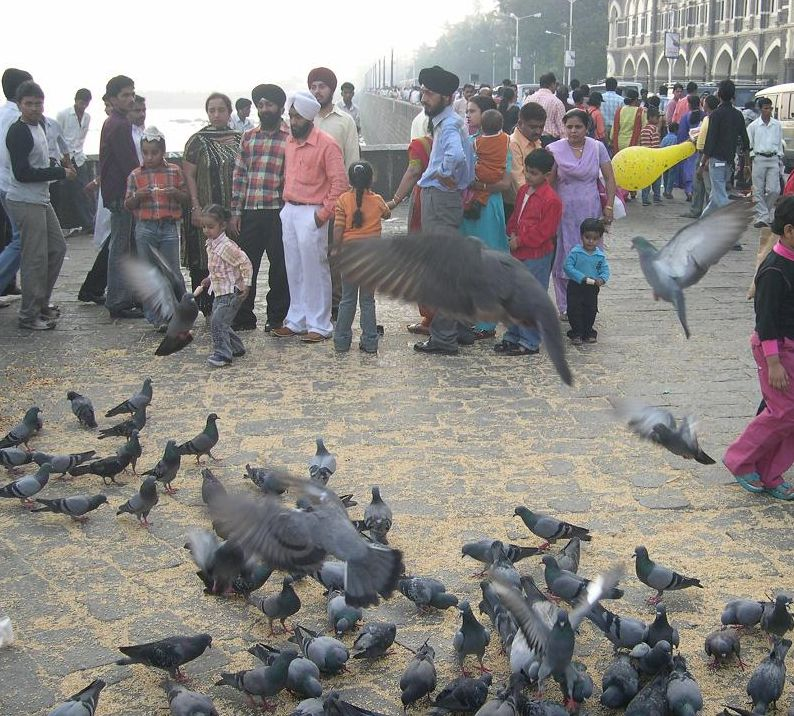
Sikhs are easily recognized by their distinctive turbans, as well as their other articles of faith.

The dastār is considered an integral part of the unique Sikh identity. The bare head is not considered appropriate as per gurbani. If a Sikh wants to become one with his/her guru, he/she must look like a guru (wear a dastār). Guru Gobind Singh stated:

Khalsa mero roop hai khaas. Khalse me hau karo niwas. ("Khalsa is a true picture of mine. I live in Khalsa.")

Maintaining long hair and tying the dastār is seen as a token of love, obedience of the wishes of Sikh gurus, and acceptance to the Will of God. A quote from Sikhnet:

The dastār is our Guru's gift to us. It is how we crown ourselves as the Singhs and Kaurs who sit on the throne of commitment to our own higher consciousness. For men and women alike, this projective identity conveys royalty, grace, and uniqueness. It is a signal to others that we live in the image of Infinity and are dedicated to serving all. The turban doesn't represent anything except complete commitment. When you choose to stand out by tying your dastār, you stand fearlessly as one single person standing out from six billion people. It is a most outstanding act.

The wearing of a turban excludes the wearing of a cap by Sikhs.

=== Ceremonies ===
Various ceremonies are associated with the Sikh turban:

- Dastar bandi: The first time a Sikh adolescent has a turban-tied.
- Sehra bandi: The tying of a turban on a Sikh groom prior to his marriage.
- Rasam dastar: A tying of a turban on the oldest-surviving man of a family after the death of the former eldest man to mark the new head of the family. This occurs on the tenth day following the funeral. It is also known as pagṛī bannhvāuṇ dī rasam.
- Turban exchange

== Styles of dastārs ==
Illustration of the sidha pag style

Sikh turban styles (including shape and colour) vary by individual preference, sect (most visibly the Nihangs, Namdharis, Nirmalas, and 3HO), political persuasion (such as the Akali Dal, which favours yellow, deep blue, or black turbans), occupation (such as in the military or police), function (such as sports or dancers), geography, and gender. Historical Sikh turban styles include the following:

- Royal Indic turban: Popular during the period of the Sikh gurus (c. 1500–1700), a style associated with the Rajputs and Mughals but adopted by the Sikhs.
- Khalsa-style turban: Worn during the period of Sikh militancy in the 18th and early 19th centuries (c. 1700–1820). It included variations reminiscent of the present-day dumalla and patka. The Nihangs developed their own unique style in the form of the dastar-bunga ("tower turban"), adorned with weaponry, blue in colour, and the inclusion of a farla. The Namdhari turban is a derivative of this style.
- Regal turban: Worn during the height of Sikh political power in the early 19th century (c. 1801–1849), with possible Afghan influence. It consists of the dip in the middle of the turban.
- Colonial styles (1849–1947): The colonial-style turbans were influenced by military and police uniforms, with beards being tied with nets. A prominent turban style of this era was the nok pagh. Bhupinder Singh of Patiala made the patiala shahi style popular.
- Modern styles (1947–present): The nok pagh remains dominant but other turban styles include the gol parna, dumalla, keski, U.K.-style pagh, Amritsari pag, Patiala shahi pag, morni pag, gurmukhi dastar, wattan wali pag, and the adoption of turbans by Sikh women. A notable variation is the style worn by East African Sikhs.

Modern Sikh men mainly wear four kinds of turban: Wattan Wali Turban, Patiala Shahi Turban, UK/Kenyan style and Dumala. The more traditional Turban styles are the Darbara Singh Dummala, Dastar Bunga, and the Puratan Nok Pagg. A comfortable and casual style of turban tied is the gol parna. The Patialashahi pag, a large style, is popular with youth. Meanwhile the Sikh army soldier's turban (pecdār dastārāṅ) is neat in appearance. Nihangs often opt for conical turbans which are blue or yellow, Namdharis favour a flat, coif-like turban, 3HO prefer white-turbans that are worn by both genders, and Nirmalas wear ochre-coloured turbans.

=== Dastar Bunga ===
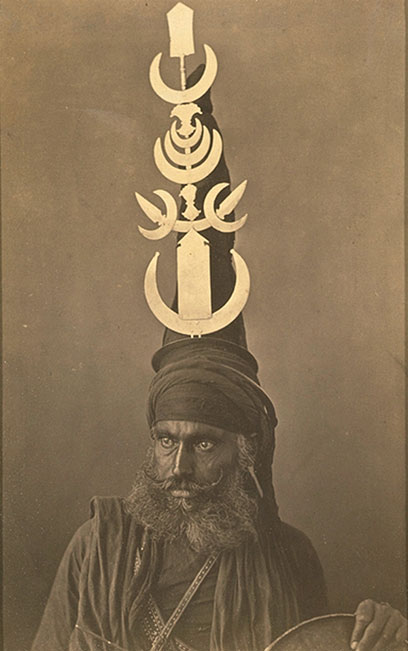
The original Sikh turban of the Khalsa Fauj, the Dastar Bunga. The Nihang's pharla is being covered at the tip of the turban.

Dastar bunga, or turban fortress in Persian, is a style of turban used by a specific sect within the Sikhs, the Akali Nihangs. As an essential part of their faith the warriors used the turban as a store for their expansive range of weapons. The Dastar Bunga is common in the Nihang traditions. The dark blue tunic (chola) and turban (dumalla) surmounted with quoit and dagger were first worn in 1699 at the time of the first Khalsa initiation ceremony of the double-edged sword (khanda-pahul). Next came the turban-flag (farra or farla), which was introduced by Guru Gobind Singh in 1702 during a clash with a Rajput hill king in the vicinity of Anandpur. The Khalsa's battle standard was cut down when its bearer, Akali Man Singh Nihang, fell wounded. Henceforth, the Guru decided that the dark blue flag should be worn as a part of Man Singh's turban, fluttering from its peak should be a yellow loose cloth for as long as its bearer had life in him.

=== UK/Kenyan Style ===
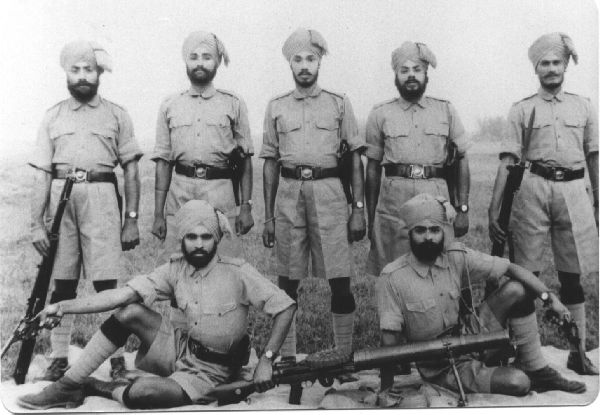
Sikh soldiers with Kenyan style Paggs and Pharlas.

The British Raj mandated all Sikh soldiers in lower ranks tied a single turban (not double-stitched), which was folded instead of stretched as a pooni and wound around the head without a pinch. This style similar to that of which constables of the Punjab Police still tie today. When Sikhs left India to work abroad in Kenya, they took this style with them but adapted it slightly for fashion, shortening the length (5 metres instead of eight) and tucking in the final wrap at an angle which produced a sharp, triangular point above the centrepoint (known as a "Chunj"). They also commonly starched their turbans, allowing them to stay in shape and be re-worn for up to 3 months after tying. When Kenyan Sikhs arrived in the UK during the 1960s and 70s, they continued to tie this style of triangular and starched turban there, making it known as both the UK and Kenyan style turban due to its popularity in both regions.

=== Nok Pagg ===
This is a very common Sikh Turban style and is most common in the Indian state of Punjab, India. The Nok (meaning point) Dastar is a double wide Dastar. 5 or more meters of the dastar cloth are cut in half then in two or three meter pieces. They are sewn together to make it double wide, thus creating a "double patti" or a nok dastar. This dastar is larger than most Sikh dastars but contains fewer wraps around the head. It is generally divided into two sub-styles: Wattan Wali (wrinkled) and Patiala Shahi (Patiala Royal). Both have the exact same shape, except Patiala Shahi features clear lines (known as "Larrs") on its left side, whereas Wattan Wali replaces these "larrs" with wrinkles instead of clear pleats and is slightly flatter at the front of the turban due to how the fabric is folded to create the wrinkles (as opposed to the pleats in Patiala Shahi turbans creating a more "beaked" look at the front, known as a Nok).

Morni Dastar

Another common Nok style is the Morni Dastar. This is essentially a Patiala Shahi pagg with a very pointed front (Nok) as compared the flatter Patiala Shahi style, and was given the name "Morni" (meaning "peacock" in Punjabi) due to its "beaked" Nok resembling the beak of a peacock. The style often features very clean larhs (lines or layers, typically on the turban's left side) and is very popular amongst younger boys in Punjab due to its elegant, neat and royal appearance.

Bhangra singer Inderjit Nikku is famous for his Morni style Dastar and to helped boost its popularity in the early 2000s, as well as other popular singers such as Lehmber Hussainpuri and Diljit Dosanjh, whose song "Paggan Pochviyan" (pointed turban) launched him to fame and was written to honour the style.

Chand Tora Dumalla

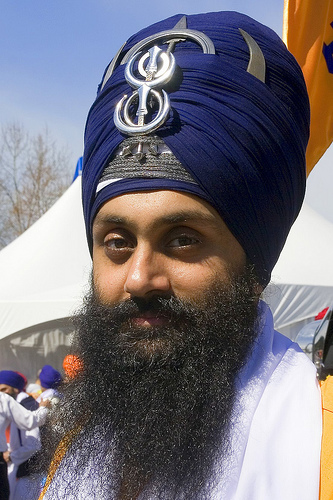
Chand Tora Dumalla with many shaster

The Chand Tora Dumalla is the style of turban generally worn by Nihang Sikhs. This is a warrior style turban meant for going into battle. The "Chand Tora" is a metal symbol consisting of a crescent and a double edged sword, it is held in place at the front of the turban by a woven chainmail cord tied in a pattern within the turban to protect the head from slashing weapons. This was not the original battle turban for the Khalsa as the Dastar Bunga was the first.

== Specifications ==
=== Size and material ===
There is no specific restriction or mandates regarding the colour, size, or shape of a turban. Most turban material is 5 m (length) x 1 m (width) but the length can vary from 4–10 m depending on individual style. Children's patkas range in size from 18 inches x 18 inches to 27 inches x 27 inches. The most popular material type is semitransparent cotton fabric (such as rubia fine and mulmul). Turban material is washed before being used to tie a turban. The wearing of a cap (tarbūsh) underneath one's turban is not permitted and instead an under-turban is worn that comprises of a shorter and lighter cloth. During leisure or rest, a small type of turban, known as a keskī, may be worn. Devout Sikhs (maryādāvādī) often wear a keski under their main turban.

=== Colour ===
Sikhs are not mandated to wear strictly a certain colour and it varies by individual preference or association. Turbans can be worn in varying colours, some have certain underlying meanings and is worn in certain contexts:

- Saffron: symbolizes bravery and worn during rallies.
- White: symbolizes tranquility and often worn by elders or during funerals.
- Pink and red: associated with spring and worn during marriage ceremonies.
- Orange and navy blue: traditional Sikh colours (blue represents martiality while orange symbolizes wisdom) associated with religious events or observations.
- Black: representation of humility, popular with Sikh youth and worn at formal occasions.
- Camouflage: worn in the military.

Colour also varies by sect and politics. Nihangs Singhs prefer blue or yellow turbans, Akali Dal workers prefer black, yellow, or blue turbans, Namdharis prefer a white turban, as do Sikhs associated with the Indian National Congress (who also prefer white turbans). Sikh soldiers wear green (olive/khaki) turbans.

== Accessories ==
There are various associated, optional items related to the Sikh dastar, such as the following:

- Fifty: small band of cloth worn under the turban on the forehead, becoming visible as a triangle to help symmetrically align the turban, fixes the bun, and protects the material from oily hair. Historically it was a mini turban half the length of the main turban but nowadays it is a small band of cloth.
- Thata: a small band of cloth worn on the beard to affix it in place, usually worn in the mornings for around half an hour.
- Salai or Baaj: a hairpin used to fix loose and short dreads, also used to straighten the drapes (ladh) of the turban. It is kept within the turban and taken out when needed.
- Beard pins: pins used to keep the beard in place.
- Beard rubber bands: used to tie a beard-bun.
- Kalgi: an accessory associated with royalty, it is historically associated with the Sikh gurus (who are often depicted wearing it). It comprises of a metal badge that contains one or more feathers, a vertical pin, and sometimes amalgamated with a string of pearls, with the kalgi being placed on the crest of the turban. Modern kalgis (usually worn during weddings) tend to be plastic.
- Gota: sewn ribbons that are usually silver or gold that compliment the sides of the turban, usually worn during weddings and festivals.
- Khanda: Sikh symbol sometimes worn in the form of a pin, usually by Nihangs.
- Weaponry: various weaponry (such as daggers, knives, circlet or chakar) that are secured to the turban through the use of iron chains. This practice is commonly done by Nihangs.

== Harassment faced by turban-wearing Sikhs ==
After the September 11, 2001, attacks in USA, a number of dastār-wearing Sikhs faced assaults by some Americans who confused them with Muslims, who were being associated with terrorism. Due to Sikh turbans resembling the imama turban that Osama bin Laden wore in his most iconic photo, United States Department of Justice worked with the Sikh American Legal Defense and Education Fund (SALDEF) to issue a poster aimed at getting Americans acquainted with Sikh turbans.

== Conflicts with civil law ==
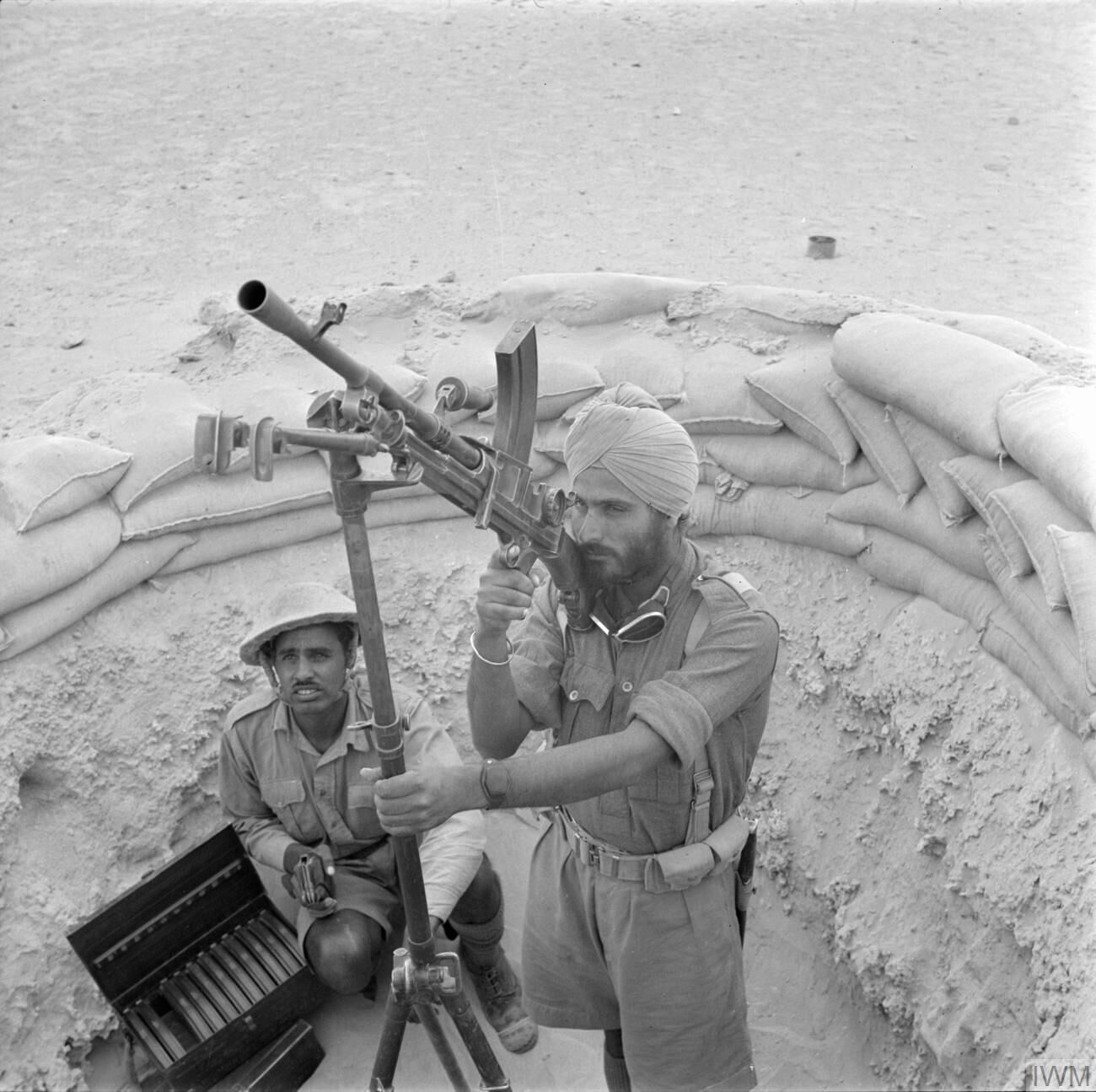
Indian troops man a Bren gun during the Western Desert Campaign in World War II. The Sikh soldier is wearing a dastār, his non-Sikh companion is wearing a Brodie steel helmet

In modern times, there have been conflicts between Sikhs—especially those outside India—and laws which conflict with always wearing a dastār. Sikh soldiers refused to wear helmets during World War I and World War II. Many Sikhs have refused to remove the dastār even in jails. Sikh scholar and social activist Bhai Randhir Singh underwent a fast to be able to wear a dastār in prison.

In the UK in 1982, the headmaster of a private school refused to admit an orthodox Sikh as a pupil unless he removed the dastār and cut his hair. This led to the long legal battle, Mandla v. Dowell Lee, a case which contributed to the creation of the legal term "ethno-religious".

In Canada in 1990, the Supreme Court of Canada ruled that Baltej Singh Dhillon, a Royal Canadian Mounted Police officer, should be allowed to wear a dastār while on duty. See the case of Grant v. Canada A.G (1995) 125 D.L.R. (4th) 556 (F.C.A.) aff'd (1994) 81 F.T.R. 195 (F.C.T.D.) (Reed J.) where the court said that the Sikh RCMP officer had a constitutional right to wear his dastār and that the government's decision to accommodate him was required to protect freedom of religion:

"The defendants and the intervenors, particularly the able argument of Ms. Chotalia for the Alberta Civil Liberties Association, turn the plaintiffs' argument respecting discrimination on its head. They argue that the Commissioner's decision was designed to prevent discrimination occurring to Khalsa Sikhs. As such they argue that that decision offends none of the provisions of the Charter, indeed that it is required by section 15 of the Charter." para 103 Shirish Chotalia, Alberta lawyer, represented the Sikh Society of Calgary, the Alberta Civil Liberties Association, and the Friends of the Sikhs, pro bono.

In the United States in 2002, Jasjit Singh Jaggi, a Sikh traffic policeman employed with the New York Police Department, was forced to leave his job because he insisted on wearing a dastār on duty. He petitioned with the New York Human Rights Commission, and in 2004 a US judge ruled that he should be reinstated.

In France in 2004, the Sikh community protested against the introduction of a law prohibiting the display of any religious symbols in state-run schools. The Shiromani Gurdwara Parbandhak Committee urged the French Government to review the bill, stating that the ban would have grave consequences for the Sikhs. The Government of India discussed the matter with the French officials, who stated that an exception for turbaned Sikh boys in French public schools was not possible.

In 2007, the Canadian government introduced new procedures for accommodation of Sikhs in regard to passport photos, driver licensing, and other legal licensing. This bill was also supported by the Sikh Council of Canada.

In April 2009, Capt. Kamaljit Singh Kalsi and 2nd Lt. Tejdeep Singh Rattan challenged a U.S. Army order that they remove their turbans and shave their beards. In March 2010, Rattan became the first Sikh to graduate Army Officer School at Fort Sam Houston since the exemption was eliminated in 1984; a waiver was granted for his religion. Kalsi will also attend basic training.

In Ireland, Ravinder Singh Oberoi applied to become a member of the voluntary police force Garda Reserve but was not permitted to wear a dastār in 2007. He unsuccessfully claimed discrimination on grounds of race and religion; the High Court ruled in 2013 on a preliminary issue that he could not claim under employment equality legislation as he was not an employee and was not in vocational training. But in 2019, Garda Commissioner Drew Harris granted exemptions for uniform alterations based on the Garda uniform code to allow officers from some ethnic communities to wear clothing related to their religion. Oberoi is currently working in the GR as of November 2020.

=== Instances of acceptance ===
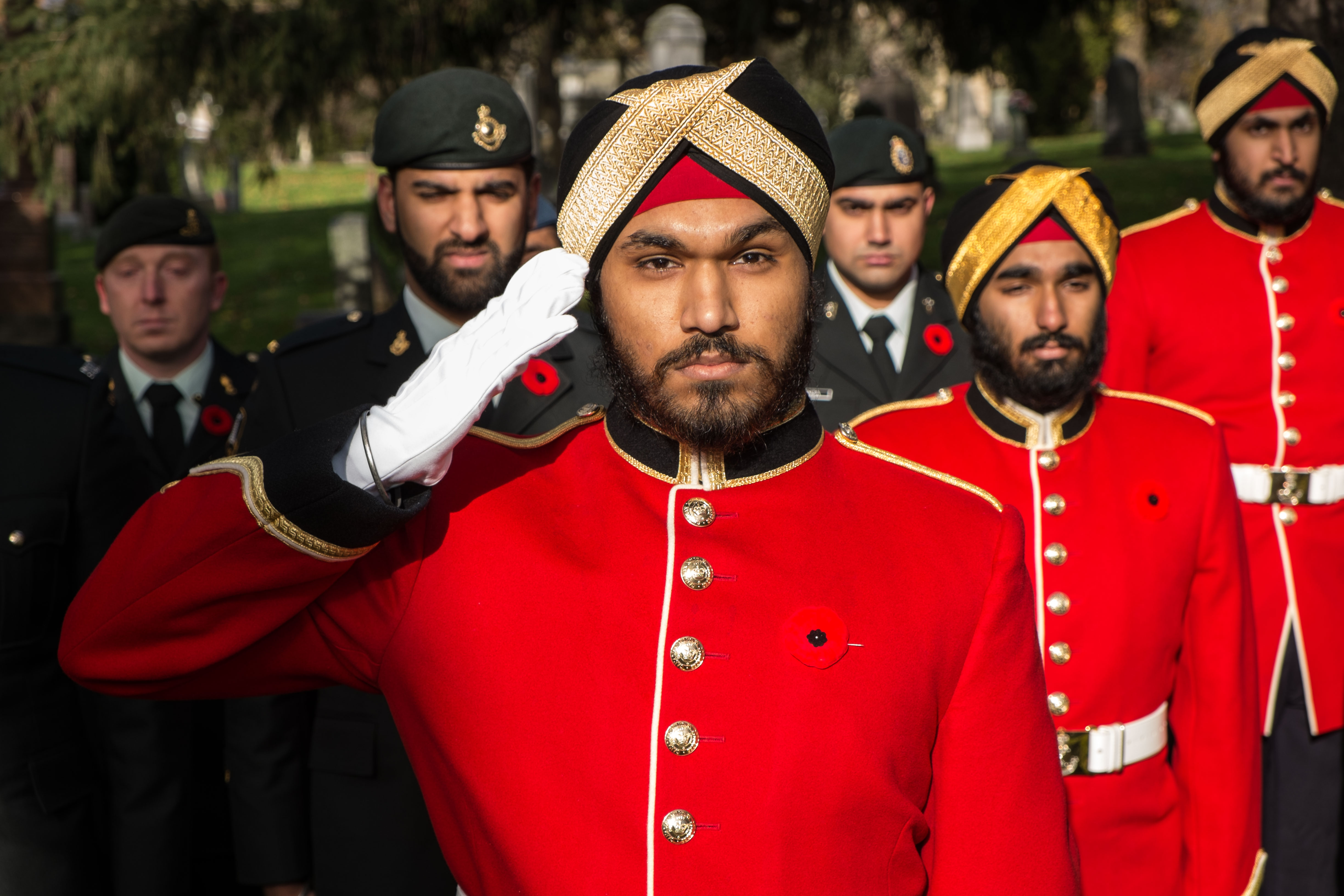
Officer cadets of the Royal Military College of Canada wearing a dastār. Sikh members of the Canadian Armed Forces are permitted to wear the dastār in most situations.

In 2012 British media reported that a Guardsman of the Scots Guards Jatinderpal Singh Bhullar became the first Sikh to guard Buckingham Palace wearing a dastār instead of the traditional bearskin.

Sikh members of the Canadian Armed Forces are permitted to wear the dastār on all orders of dress within the forces, although the unit commander retains the right to order for adjustments should a conflict arise with operational safety. The colour of the dastār for Sikh service members within the Canadian Army, and the Royal Canadian Air Force are required to match the colours of their unit's headgear. Sikhs serving within the Royal Canadian Navy are required to wear a white dastār when peaked caps are worn, and a black dastār when berets are worn. The unit's cap badge must also be worn on the dastār. Additionally, some units in the Canadian Armed Forces add a ribbon matching their regimental colours, worn crossed behind the cap badge and tucked in at the back.

=== Helmet exemption ===
In several parts of the world, Sikh riders are exempted from legal requirements to wear a helmet when riding a motorcycle or a bicycle, which cannot be done without removing the dastār. These places include India, Nepal and the Canadian provinces of Alberta, British Columbia, Ontario and Manitoba. Other places include Malaysia, Hong Kong, Singapore, Thailand, and the United Kingdom. In Queensland, Australia, riders of bicycles and mobility scooters are exempt from wearing an approved helmet, but not motorcyclists.

In 2008, Baljinder Badesha, a Sikh man living in Brampton, Ontario, Canada, lost a court case in which he challenged a $110 ticket received for wearing a dastār instead of a helmet while riding his motorcycle.

In September 2016 a court in Quebec, Canada, ruled that Sikh truck drivers working at the Port of Montreal must wear hard hats when required for safety reasons, effectively requiring them to remove their dastār. The judge stated that their safety outweighed their religious freedom. Previously Sikh drivers were able to avoid wearing hard hats if they remained within their vehicle, but this increased the loading times and was not commercially acceptable.

== Sikh women and turbans ==
Sikh women generally do not wear turbans, apart from members of the Akali-Nihang and AKJ sects within Sikhism; there is also the 3HO new religious movement (pejoratively referred to as a cult). However, some mainstream Sikh women in the diaspora from the second-generation onwards have started wearing turbans as a means of gender-equality. According to the official Sikh Rehat Maryada, the question of Sikh women wearing turbans is optional and not mandated nor necessarily prescribed. Some sects (sampradāvāṅ) mandate that women tie a keski under their headscarf (dupaṭṭā).

== See also ==
- Dastar bunga
- Dumalla
- Kesh (Sikhism)
- Khăn vấn
- Salai (needle)
- Sikh chola
- Turban training centre
- Patka
- Rumāl
