= Dumalla =

Dastaar/turban worn by Sikhs

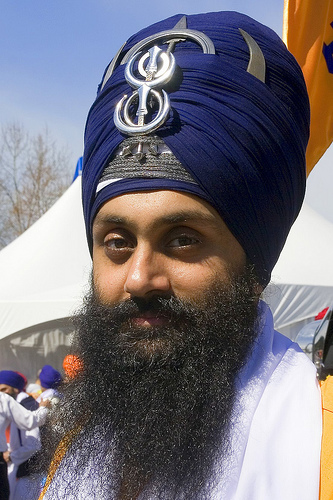
Nihang wearing a Dumalla

The Dumalla is a type of turban worn by Sikhs. This turban is worn mainly by Nihang Sikhs and members of the Akhand Kirtani Jatha, whereas those associated with the Damdami Taksal tie an alternate style of round turban known as a Taksali Gol Dastar, which is often mistaken for a Dumalla. The word Dumalla means "Du" meaning two and "Malla" meaning cloth or fabric. This is because there will usually be one fabric to form the base of the turban and a second to wrap around the base to form the turban itself. There many different types of Dumalla, in many different sizes, although colours are usually restricted to the 3 traditional Khalsa colours of blue (Navy or electric), saffron and white. In recent decades, tying a black dumalla has also become acceptable, despite never being a traditional practice during the time of the Gurus.

== Symbolism ==
The Dumalla style may trace its origin to Fateh Singh, the youngest son of Guru Gobind Singh. The Dumalla itself was worn by many of the Sikh Gurus, thus many Sikhs also adopted the Dumalla. During the era of Mughal rule many Mughals would wear turbans as a crown to show they were of royal stature and was seen as a symbol of noble authority, whereas the poor and those who were not Muslim were not allowed to wear turbans, leading to oppression and inequality during the rule. Sikh Gurus, most notably starting with Guru Arjan Dev, seeing this took a stand against this and said "If the Mughals wear one turban, we will wear two" to show that they would stand against the oppression and tyranny of that age. Since then, Sikhs have been wearing the Dumalla as part of practicing their way of life.

== Styles ==
=== Modern Dumalla ===
This is the turban many Sikhs who wear the Dumalla will adorn. There will usually be a base made with the hair wrapped into a bun through being twisted into a cloth to form the base or forming a bun and then covering with a cloth. It is generally tied in the way that the first layer goes over the right ear to the left top side of the base in a diagonal wrap and the same follows with the over the left ear to the right top side of the base and the third wrap going from the right ear to the top in a horizontal wrap across the top of the eyebrows. The rest of the turban is tied following the same pattern as the third wrap, being wrapped above each additional wrap until it reaches the top of turban and the extra cloth is tucked in between the existing wraps. This is a neater style of turban worn by members of the Akhand Kirtani Jatha, distinct to the Nihang Singh style of Dumalla.

=== Chand Tora/Shastar Bunga ===
This is a warrior style turban which was worn by Sikhs in battle. It is a larger, more conical shaped Dumalla, which is adorned with Sarbloh (wrought iron) weapons (Shastar) and a metal quilt to protect the head from sword slashes. This type of turban is exclusively worn by Nihang Singhs.

== See also ==
- Dastar
- Patka
- Rumāl
