= Sikh chola =

Traditional martial robe worn in Sikhism

Sikh Chola ਚੋਲਾ
- Preserved Sikh chola
- Type: Indian (specifically Punjabi)
- Place of origin: Punjab

Sikh Chola (Punjabi: ਚੋਲਾ (Gurmukhi), romanized: Cōlā, lit. 'Robe') is traditional dress worn by Sikhs.

== Description ==
It is a martial attire which gives freedom of movement to a Sikh warrior. Sikh Chola is also unisex attire, and may also be decorated with heavy embroidery all over it or on the chest.

== Preserved examples ==
There are preserved chola relics and artefacts that were worn by the Sikh Gurus. A particular Khilka-type Chola believed to have belonged to Guru Nanak has garnered considerable attention and study. A preserved chola of Guru Hargobind linked to the tale of his release from Gwalior Fort with fifty-two fellow prisoners is believed to be preserved at Ghudani Kalan village in Ludhiana district of Punjab, India.

== Gallery ==
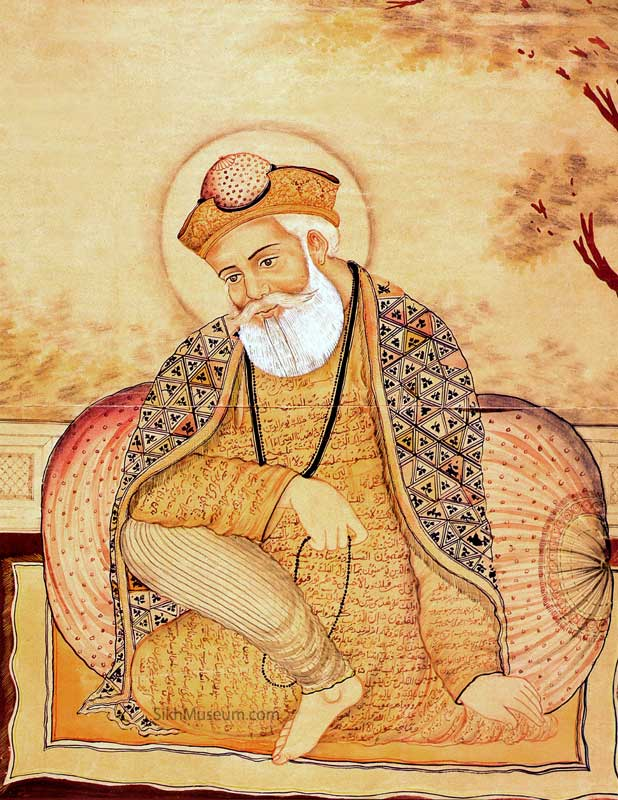
19th century painting depicting Guru Nanak wearing robe with Perso-Arabic inscriptions

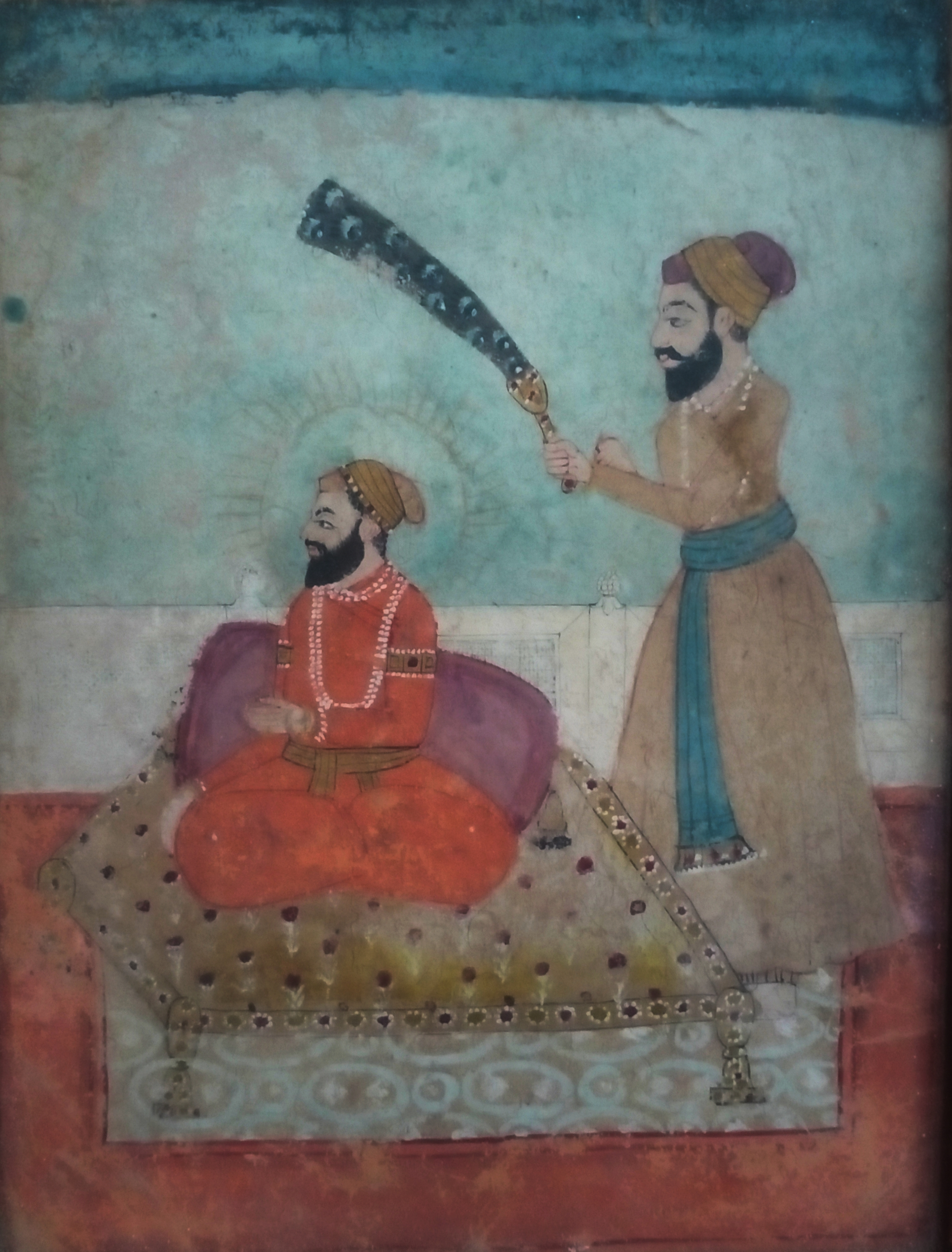
Historical painting of Guru Hargobind dressed in chola

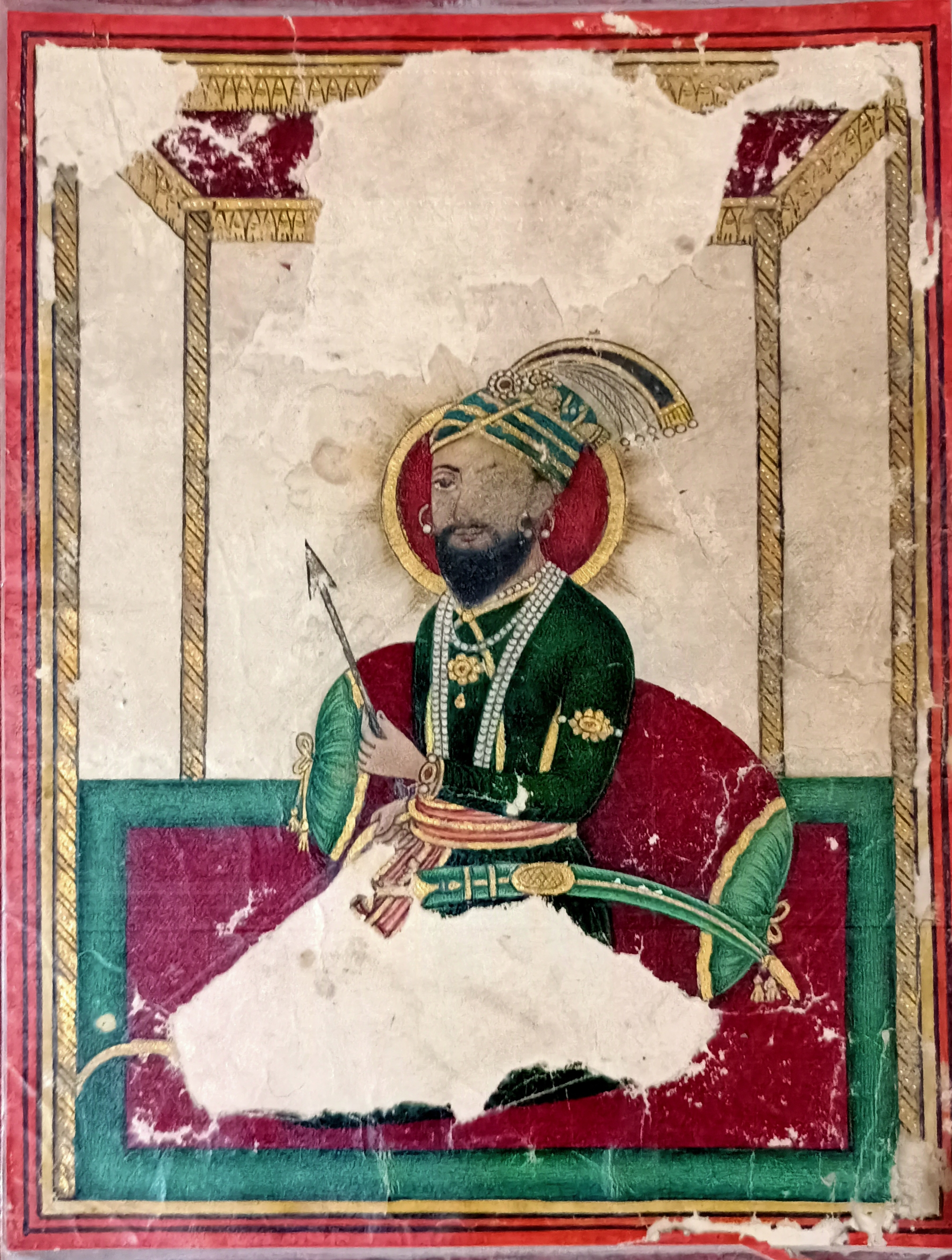
Historical painting of Guru Gobind Singh dressed in chola

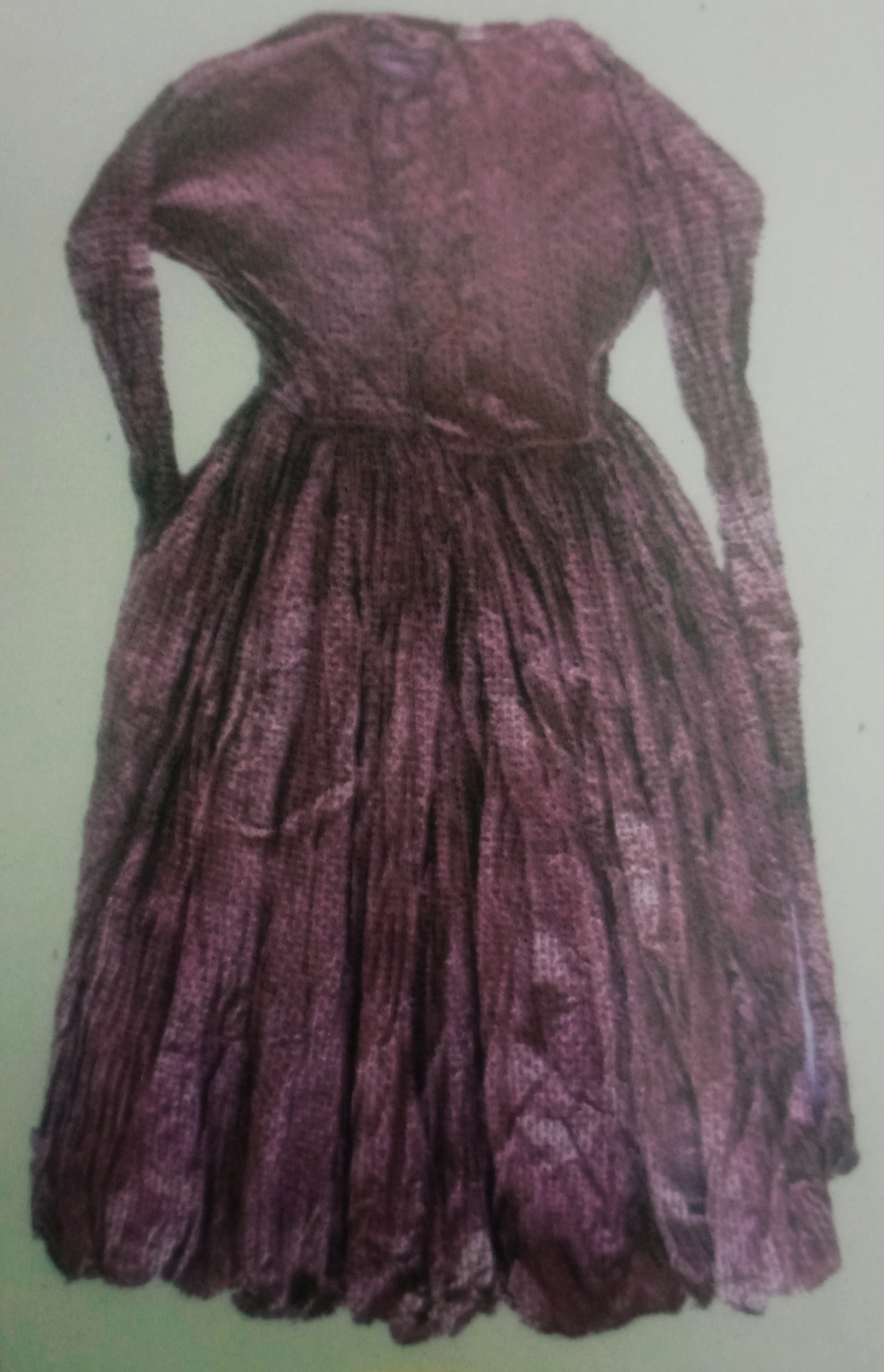
Chola of Guru Gobind Singh.

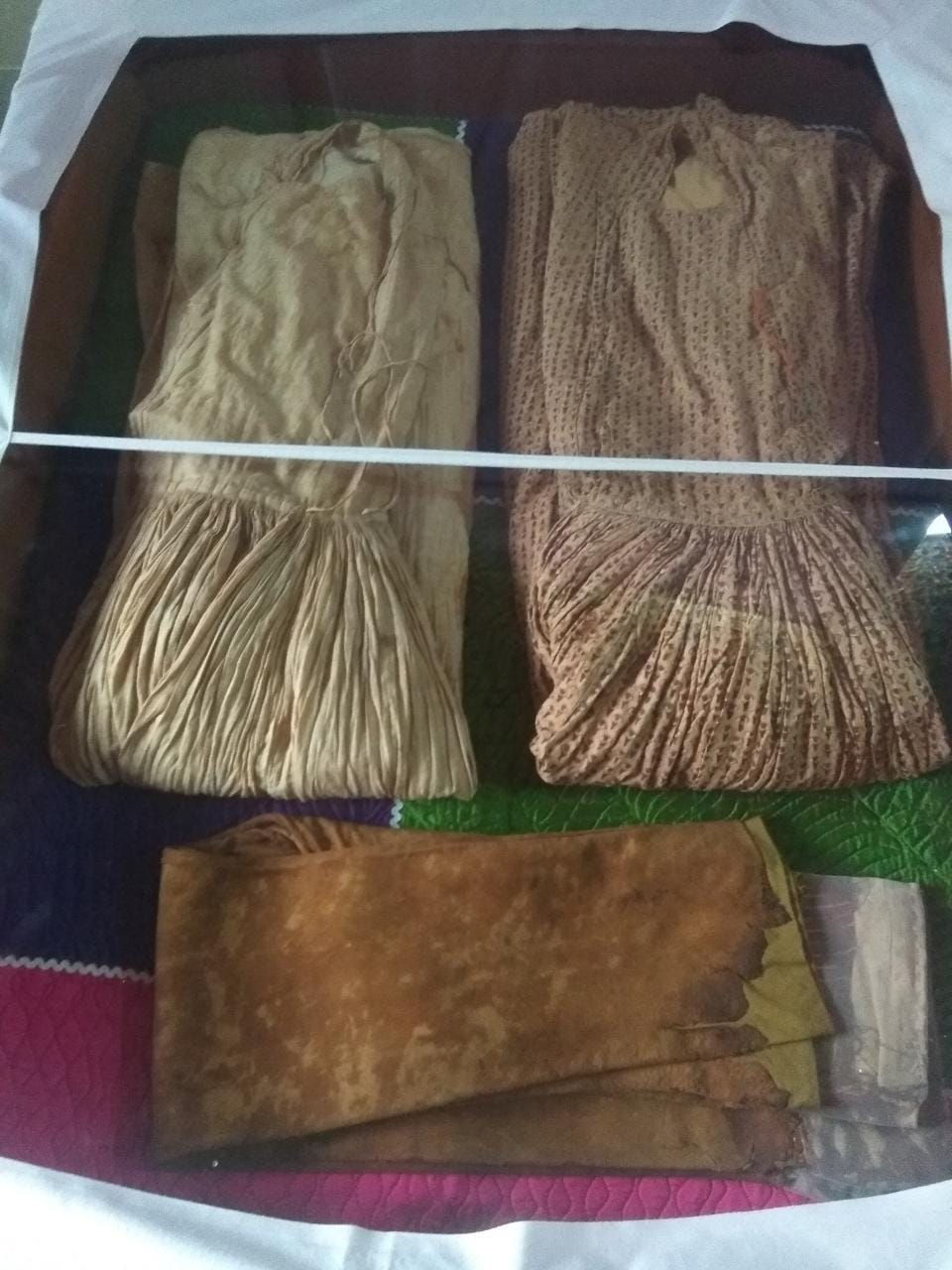
Clothing relics of Guru Gobind Singh kept by Bhai Behlo's descendants

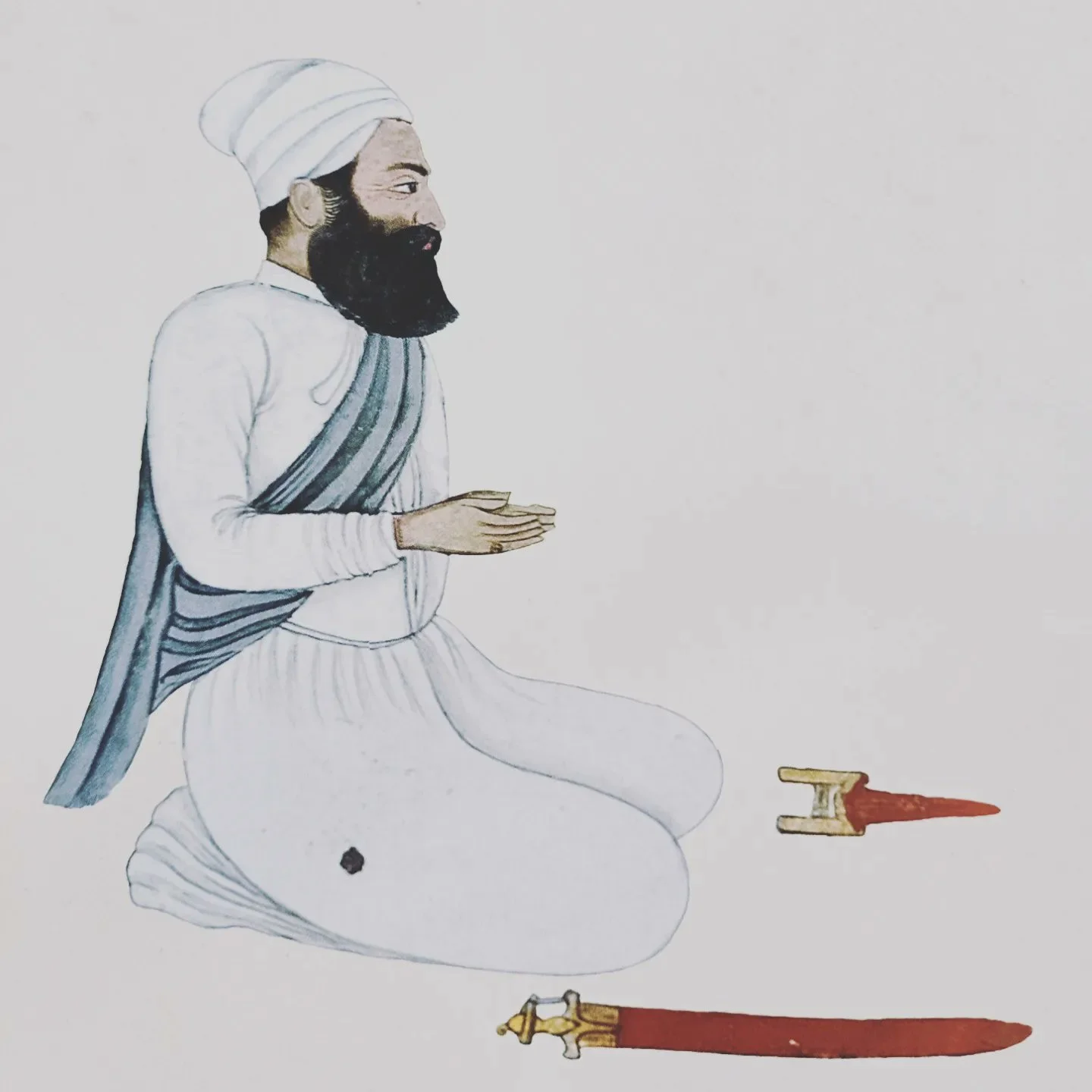
Depiction of Bhai Alam Singh 'Nachna' (died 1705), a close companion of Guru Gobind Singh, wearing chola

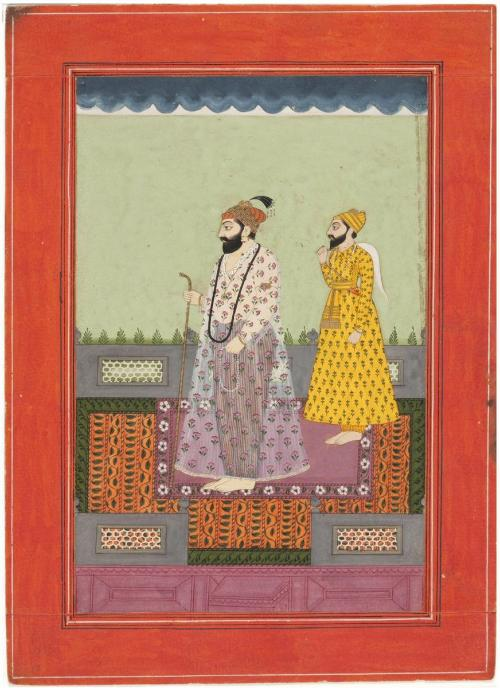
Circa 1750 painting of Guru Hargobind (also identified as Guru Har Rai) and an attendant wearing chola

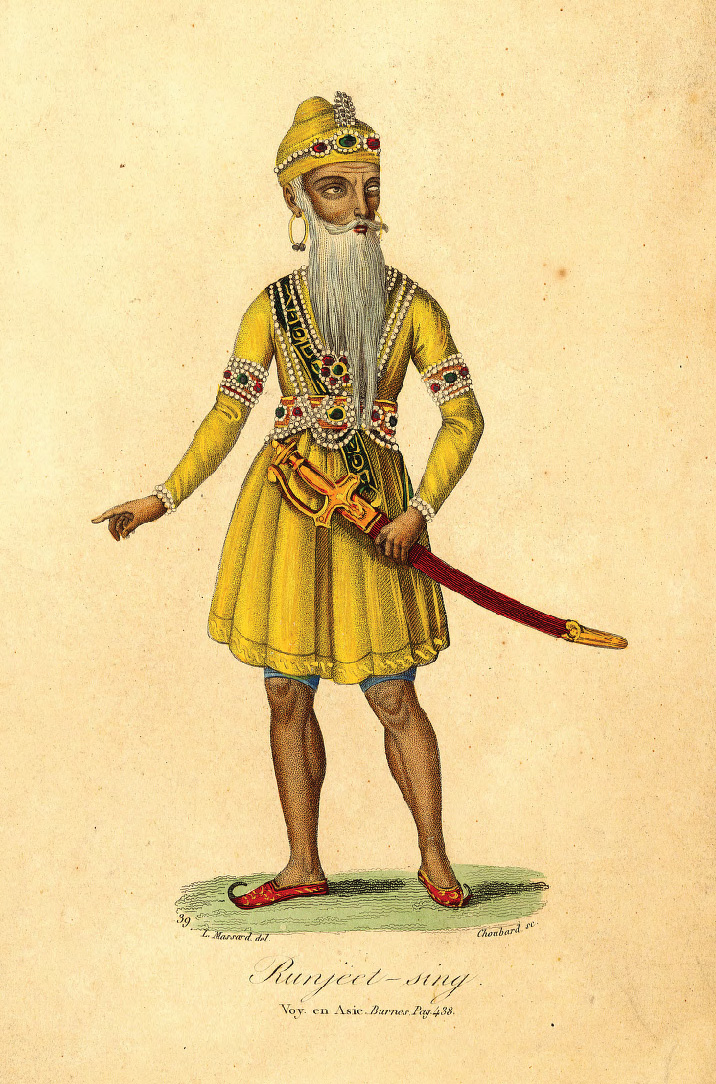
Painting of Maharaja Ranjeet Singh standing wearing chola

== See also ==
- Sikh art and culture
- Dastar
- Rumāl
- Patka
- Thatha
