= Salai =

Salai may refer to:

- Boswellia serrata, Indian frankincense
- Salaì (1480–1524), nickname of Gian Giacomo Caprotti da Oreno, an Italian artist and pupil of Leonardo da Vinci
- Salai (needle), a turban needle used by Sikhs
- Śālā, also spelled salai or calai, a school attached to a 1st-millennium Hindu or Jain temple in South India
- Salai, Hsi Hseng, a village in Hsi Hseng Township, Burma
