= Dona Qutab Saru =

Coordinates: 30°19′24.7″N 73°51′27.7″E

Dona Qutab Saru (دونہ قطب ساڑھو), previously known as Dunna Mamewala, is a small village in Bahawalnagar District, Punjab, Pakistan.

It lies about one kilometre from a metalled road that links the city of Bahawalnagar to the district of Okara. It is located nearly 70 km away from the city of Bahawalnagar in the west and about 28 km from the city of Haveli Lakha in the east. The nearest bus station is called Adda Bareka, a small market catering to shopping requirements of dozens of villages connected to the place through twin bridges on the parallel-running canals of Fordwah and Sadiqia, two tributary water-courses emanating from River Sulej at the famous Sulemanki Headworks about 6 kilometres east of Adda Bareka. The village is believed to have been founded around 1890 by Mian Muhammad Khan Saru alias Mammay Khan, the son of Mian Hasil Khan Saru after whose name neighboring village Hasil Saru exists.

Dona Qutab Saru is mainly populated by members of Saru family drawn from the Dervaishka sub-caste of the Wattoo clan that inhabits the lower and upper banks of River Sutlej through the plains of Punjab province. The village boasts of two primary schools, both for boys and girls. There are several grocery shops and convenience stores in the village. It has two mosques. The central mosque is called Jamia Masjid Ya Rasool Allah. The literacy rate in the village is about 40 per cent with a growing number of youth attending religious seminaries and returning as حا فظ قرأن or the reciters of the Quran. The population, consisting of about 2000 individuals, comprises almost wholly of Muslims of Sunni sect. Dona Qutab Saru is surrounded by village Thatha on the east, Bheni Jhabailan Wali on the north, Dona Jeevan Saru and Hasil Saru in the west and Adda Bareka in the south.
