= Head covering for Sikh women =

Head covering for Sikh women may refer to:

- Dupatta
- Sikh women and turbans
