= Salai (needle) =

Needle for turbans

Salai Baaj
- Type: Sikh needle for turbans
- Place of origin: Punjab

A salai (Punjabi: ਸਲਾਈ) also known as a baaj (Punjabi: ਬਾਜ) is a specially designed needle for turbans that is used by Sikhs for tucking hair from inside the turban and is also used for smoothing out folds. There are various ranges of salai needles used by Sikhs.

== See also ==
- Dastar
- Rumal
- Patka
