= Bandi Chhor Divas =

Sikh celebration

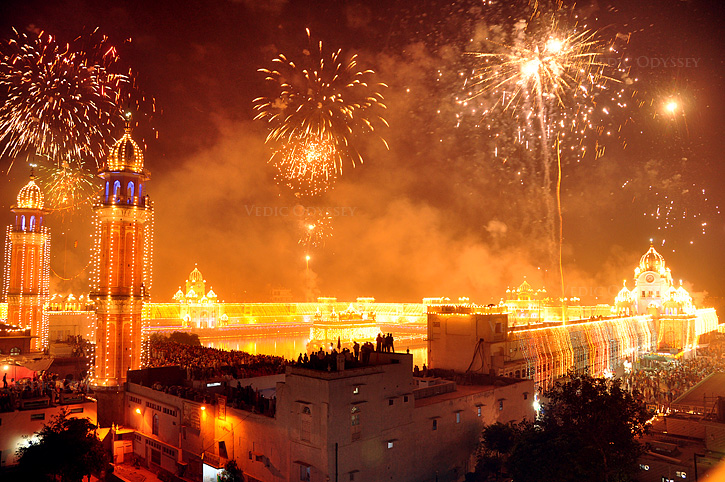
- Festive fireworks at Harmandir Sahib gurdwara on Bandi Chhor .
- Observed by: Sikhs
- Type: Religious
- Significance: Release of Guru Hargobind and 52 princes from Mughal-controlled Gwalior Fort
- Observances: Diya lighting, fireworks, prayers, nagar kirtan, langar
- Date: Amavasya of Kartika
- 2025 date: 21 October
- 2026 date: 8 November
- Frequency: Annual
- Related to: Diwali, Diwali (Jainism), Tihar, Swanti, Sohrai, Bandna

Bandi Chhor Divas (Punjabi: ਬੰਦੀ ਛੋੜ ਦਿਵਸ (Gurmukhi); meaning "Day of Liberation" or "Release of Prisoners Day"), also known as Bandi Chhor Dihara, is a Sikh celebration coinciding with Diwali commemorating the day when the sixth Guru of Sikhs, Guru Hargobind were released from Gwalior Fort, whom Sikhs believe also freed fifty-two Rajput rajas of the Hill Chieftainships alongside him, who had been imprisoned by Mughal Emperor Jahangir.

Emperor Jahangir had held 52 Princes at the Gwalior Fort for several months. Gurdwara Data Bandi Chhor Sahib is located at the place of the Guru's internment in the Fort. The day falls in autumn and often overlaps with Hindu Diwali, the festival of lights celebrated across Punjab and the rest of India. Historically, from the time of the third Sikh Guru Amar Das, Sikhs and Hindus of the time used the occasion of Diwali, Vaisakhi and other such festivals to congregate at the seat of the Gurus. In 2003, Sikh religious leaders and the Shiromani Gurdwara Parbandhak Committee led by Prof. Kirpal Singh Badungar formally adopted this day into the Nanakshahi calendar. Part of the reason of labelling the Sikh celebration of Diwali in the 2003 new Nanakshahi calendar under the term Bandi Chhor Divas was to emphasize the Sikh faith's independence from Hinduism.

The Bandi Chhor Divas is celebrated by the lighting up of homes and Gurdwaras, celebratory processions (nagar kirtan) and langar (community kitchen). It is an important Sikh celebration along with Vaisakhi, Hola Mohalla and Gurpurab. It is one of three Sikh celebrations still calculated using the traditional Bikrami calendar, alongside Hola Mohalla and Guru Nanak Gurpurab, where as the rest are determined now as per the Nanakshahi calendar.

== Description ==
Bandi Chhor Divas was celebrated when Guru Hargobind was released from Gwalior prison with 52 prisoners and princes holding on to his robe or cape with 52 ropes. The guru led all 52 innocent rulers to safety without any signs of war or battle. In addition to Nagar keertan (a street procession) and an Akhand paath (a continuous reading of Guru Granth Sahib), Bandi Chhor (Shodh) Divas is celebrated with a fireworks display. The Sri Harmandir Sahib, as well as the whole complex, is festooned with thousands of shimmering lights. The gurdwara organizes continuous kirtan singing and special musicians. Sikhs consider this occasion as an important time to visit Gurdwaras and spend time with their families.

== History and significance ==
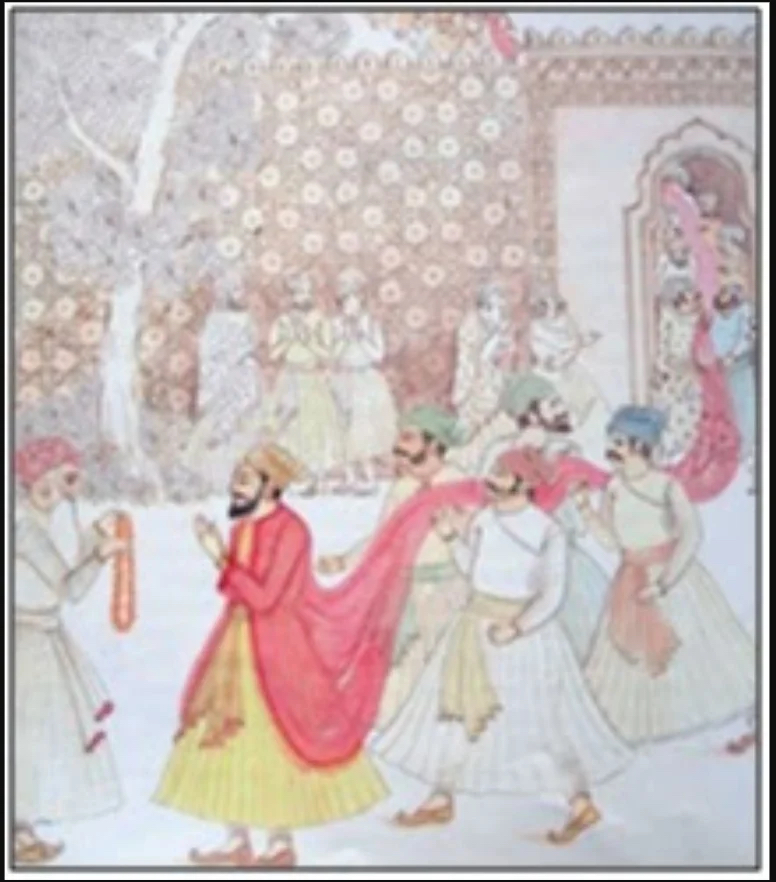
19th century depiction of Guru Hargobind saving 52 Hindu Kings imprisoned by the Mughal Empire at Gwalior prison

Guru Hargobind Sahib's father Guru Arjan Dev was arrested under the orders of the Mughal Emperor Jahangir and he was asked to convert to Islam. His refusal led to his torture and execution in 1606 CE. This event is a defining moment in the history of India and Sikhs as the martyrdom of Guru Arjan. After the execution, Guru Hargobind succeeded his father as the next Guru of Sikhs.

Guru Hargobind, on 24 June 1606, at age 11, was crowned as the sixth Sikh Guru. At his succession ceremony, he put on two swords: one indicated his resolve to maintain spiritual authority (piri) and the other, his temporal authority (miri). Because of the execution of Guru Arjan by Mughal Emperor Jahangir, Guru Hargobind was opposed to the oppression of the Mughal rule. He advised Sikhs and Hindus to arm and fight. The death of his father at the hands of Jahangir prompted him to emphasize the military dimension of the Sikh community.

Different versions exist of how the Guru was imprisoned at Gwalior Fort by Jahangir. One version suggests that when Murtaja Khan, Nawab of Lahore, noticed that the Guru had constructed the Sri Akal Takhat Sahib, 'The Throne of the Almighty', at Amritsar, and was also strengthening his army, he informed the Mughal Emperor Jahangir about this. He also, emphasized that the Sikh Guru was making preparations to take revenge for his father's torture and martyrdom. When Jahangir heard about this he at once sent Wazir Khan and Guncha Beg to Amritsar to arrest Guru Hargobind.

But Wazir Khan, who happened to be an admirer of Guru Hargobind, rather than arresting him, requested the Guru to accompany them to Delhi telling him that Emperor Jahangir wanted to meet him. The young Guru accepted the invitation and soon reached Delhi, where Jahangir interned him at the Gwalior Fort in 1609. Another version speaks of Guru Hargobind's imprisonment on the pretext that the fine imposed on Guru Arjan had not been paid by the Sikhs and Guru Hargobind. It is not clear as to how much time he spent as a prisoner. The year of his release appears to have been either 1611 or 1612, when Guru Hargobind was about 16 years old. Persian records, such as Dabistan i Mazahib suggest he was kept in jail between 1617 and 1619 in Gwalior, after which he and his camp were kept under Muslim army's surveillance by Jahangir. As per some accounts, Guru Hargobind upon his release went to Amritsar, where people were celebrating the festival of Diwali. This important event in Sikh history is now termed the Bandi Chhor Divas festival.

The supposed robe with fifty-two panels, known as the bavanja kalian vala chola, which the guru is believed by Sikhs to have worn to free the hill rajas is preserved in a glass-box at Gurdwara Sri Chola Sahib in Ghudani Kalan in Ludhiana district, Punjab. Formerly in poor-condition, the chola was restored by Namita Jaspal.

== Gallery ==
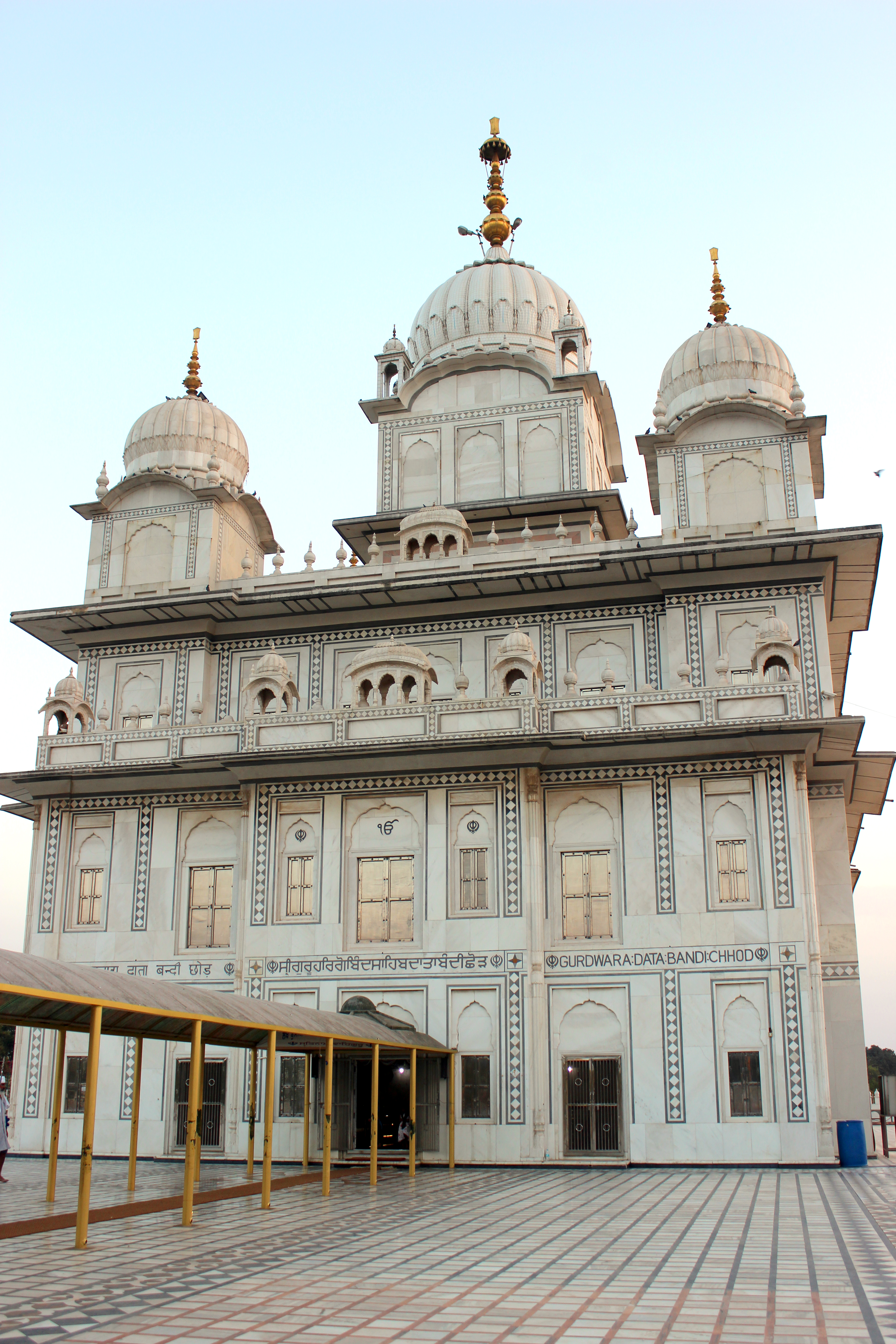
Gurdwara Sri Data Bandi Chhor Sahib at Gwalior Fort.

Preserved chola of Guru Hargobind at Ghudani Kalan village that he is believed to have worn. It has 52 tails or corners, matching with the description in the story of his release.

== See also ==
- Diwali – Hindu festival
