= Sikh American Legal Defense and Education Fund =

- Formation: 1996
- Website: https://saldef.org/

The Sikh American Legal Defense and Education Fund (SALDEF) is a national non-profit civil rights and educational organization in the United States. SALDEF is a 501(c)3 non-profit membership-based body that protects and promotes civil rights of Sikh Americans through advocacy, education, and media relations.

== History ==
In 1996, SALDEF began as the Sikh Mediawatch and Resource Task Force (SMART), an all-volunteer organization. During its inception years, its primary focus was on media analysis and education.

SALDEF's mission is to protect the civil rights of Sikh Americans and ensure a fostering environment in the United States for future generations.

In November 2004, SMART changed its name to SALDEF, which has an national office in Washington, DC.

== Activities ==
=== Legal aid ===
It provides free legal assistance on civil rights and civil liberties issues like:

- Workplace racism
- Protecting Sikh articles of faith (such as kirpan and kesh)
- Denial of public accommodation
- Other civil rights and civil liberties issues.

SALDEF staff and representatives regularly meet with government officials at the local, state, and federal levels. They also do Legislative advocacy on issues influencing ethnic and religious minority American community.

It administers outreach to local Sikh American communities through presentations about rights, community forums and voter registration.

In March 2026, American United's (AU) legal department filed cases against Turmp administration on behalf of many including SALDEF. AU and Democracy Forward represent many organisations including Interfaith Alliance, Muslims For Progressive Values, Hindus For Human Rights and SALDEF in the lawsuit.
