= Sikh women and turbans =

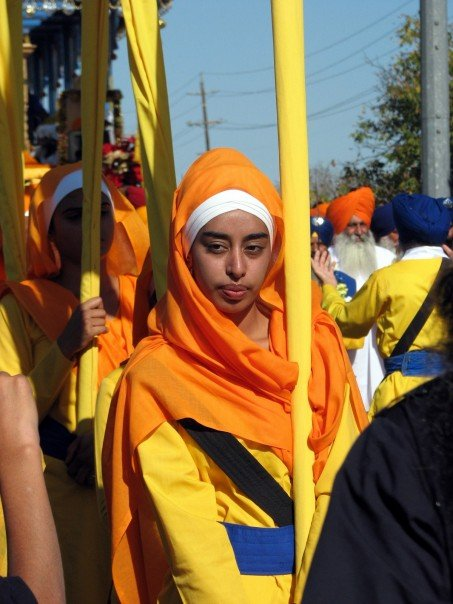
Photograph of a young Sikh woman leading the standard bearers at the Yuba City Sikh Parade, by Jasleen Kaur, 10 April 2008

The relationship between Sikh women and the turban (dastar or pagh) is complex. Although wearing a turban is traditionally a masculine-practice, some Sikh women opt to wear turbans for personal reasons. Most Sikh women instead wear a chunni. Historically, turbans were mostly exclusively worn by Sikh men rather than women. In modern-times, some Sikh girls and women have started donning it. The practice of Sikh women wearing turbans is almost exclusively a practice of diasporic, young Sikh women, whilst it is virtually non-existent amongst the middle-aged and elderly generations, or in India.

Whilst turbanned Sikh men are unequivocally representatives of Sikh masculinity, turbanned Sikh women cannot be said to be unequivocal representatives of Sikh femininity or womanhood. For Sikh men, the turban is a symbol of their masculine identity, where as for Sikh women it more represents an obscuring, a "de-feminizing" or "de-gendering" of their female identity. The trend of Sikh women wearing turban also developed as a means of distinguishing Sikh women from their Muslim or Hindu counterparts from Indian or Pakistani-backgrounds.

== History ==
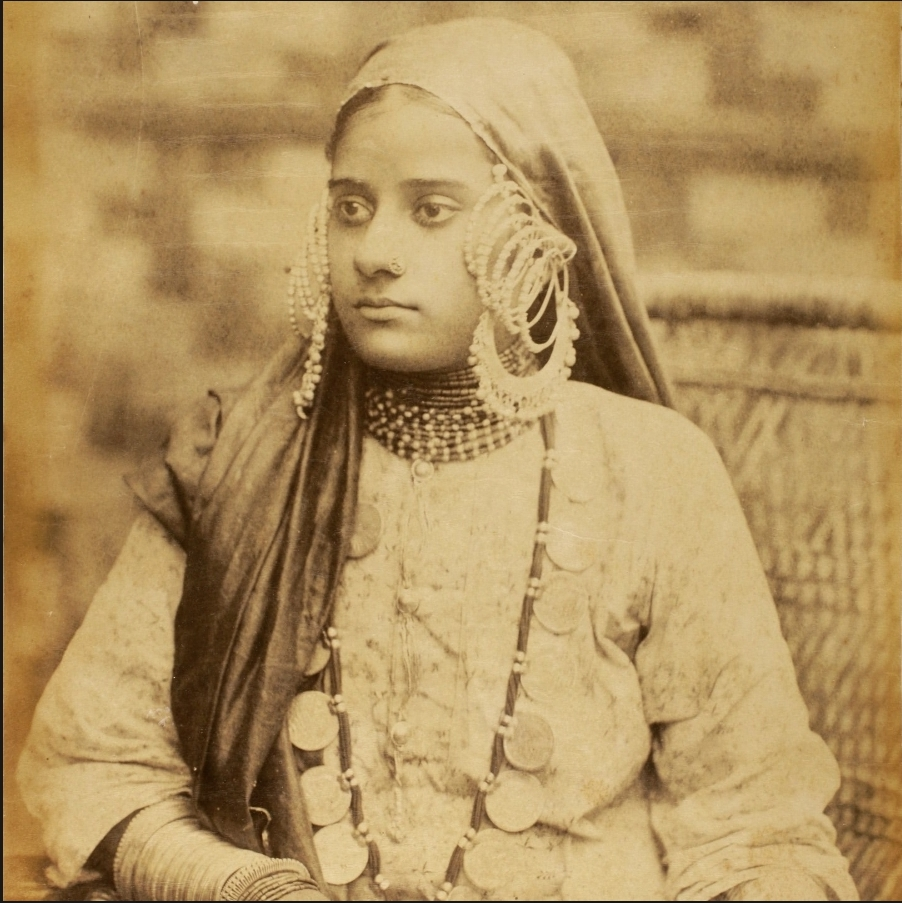
Photograph of a Sikh woman in the Punjab after her wedding wearing a chunni, ca.1870's

Traditionally, Sikh women wore a chunni or dupatta (headscarf) rather than a turban. Sikh women who are not part of the Khalsa usually only cover their hair when they are around older family members (especially males) or when visiting gurdwaras.

The turban is not one of the 5Ks mandated in mainstream Sikhism, rather it has become a tool to help manage one of the actual five Ks, kesh (uncut hair). Early Sikh literature mostly focuses on the male Khalsa identity and either do not discuss women’s inclusion into the order or are highly contradictory. The Chaupa Singh Rehitnama states that women cannot become a baptized Khalsa and those that administer khande-di-pahul to women should be shunned, instead prescribing charan pahul to women initiates (nectar of the foot rather than the sword). The Prem Sumarag, dated to between the early eighteenth century to mid-nineteenth century, states that both men and women can be initiated into the Khalsa. In the text, men are mandated to wear kacheera (breeches) and weapons whilst women are prescribed to wear a black skirt and bodice. In the patriarchal culture at the time, women did not represent "the body of the Guru", they were not named "Singh", they did not carry weapons nor did they don turbans. The "warrior-saint" image promulgated by the Khalsa was exclusive to men and women were to be dutiful wives of their husbands and study the Sikh scripture in the company of other women. Thus, the turban was a male-signifier of Sikh identity. As per Purnima Dhava, respect and prestige in 18th century Punjab was tied to both women and turbans, where alliances were made through the exchanging of turbans and offering their womenfolk (daughters) to be wed. Ceremonies associated with the Sikh turban were also male-gendered, such as the turban tying ceremony, known as the Rasam Pagri or Rasam Dastar, when a patriarch dies and his eldest son takes over the familial responsibilities by tying a turban in front of others. Furthermore, during Sikh wedding ceremonies, such as the Anand Karaj, the male groom will wear a turban, regardless if he does so in his regular life or not.

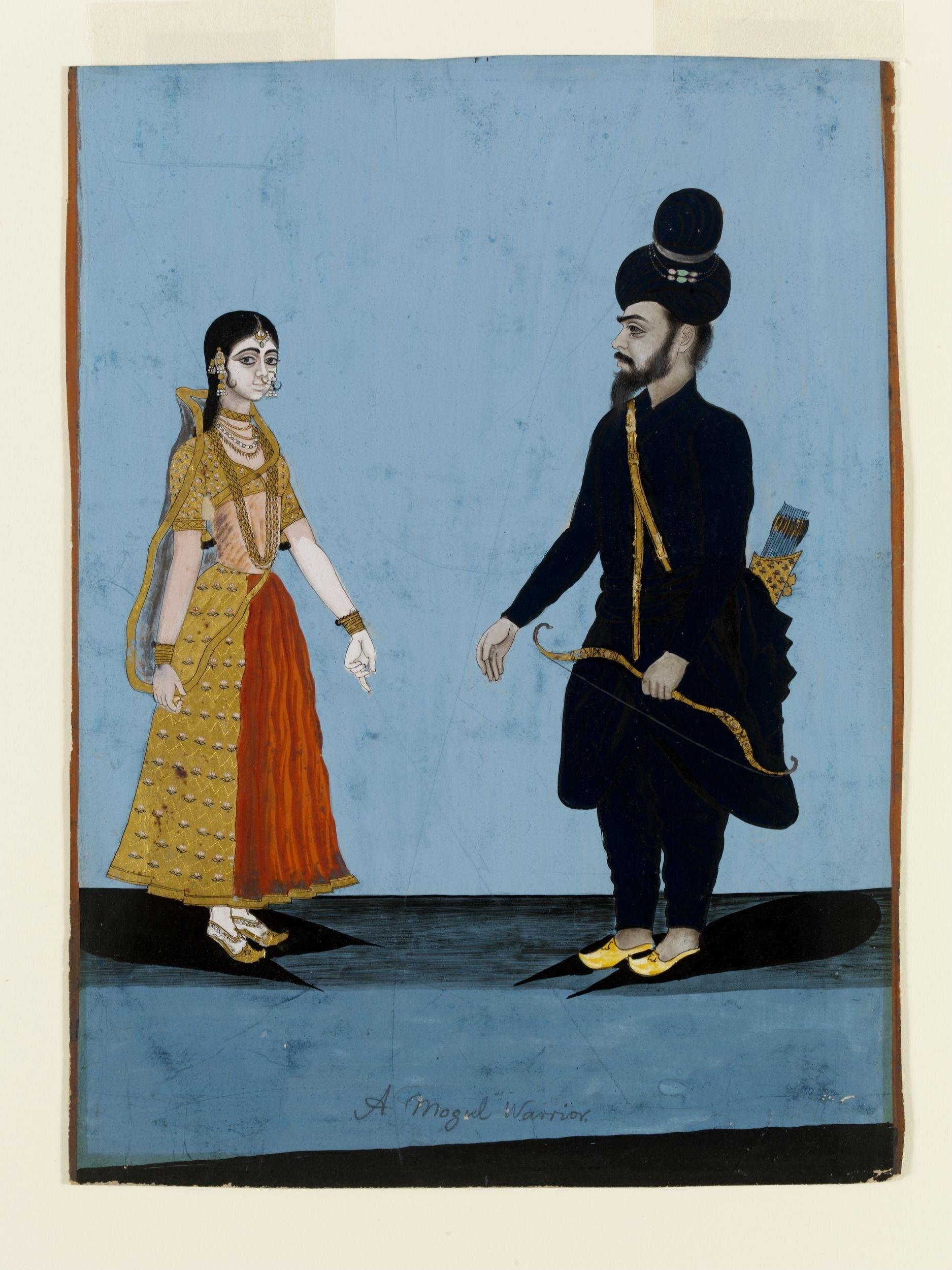
Painting of a Sikh couple featuring a warrior and his wife, ca.1790–1800

Modern artwork of Mai Bhago often depict her wearing a turban in-battle. There is a belief that Mai Bhago wore a turban and male clothing when she went to battle. The fictional Sikh female character Sundari, created by Bhai Vir Singh, is also often depicted wearing a turban. Both Mai Bhago and Sundari have become the idealized woman for Sikh women. According to a 19th-century account by Giani Gian Singh, a small number of Nihang women chose to wear turbans. An 1838 watercolour by Emily Eden depicts a Nihang woman with a turban the same size as her husband's. The Sikh Rehat Maryada does not mandate Sikh women to wear the typically-male turbans and leaves the choice up to the individual. According W. H. McLeod, the symbolic representation and importance of turbans for Sikhs was a 20th century development, where as prior to then it was just seen as a practical headwear by Sikhs instead of something religiously symbolic of their faith. Bernard Cohn traces the development of the Sikh turban as a religiously symbolic article to the British colonial period, where the turban was promoted as a characteristically Sikh-identifying garment to distinguish them in the colonial military as part of their regulated uniform.

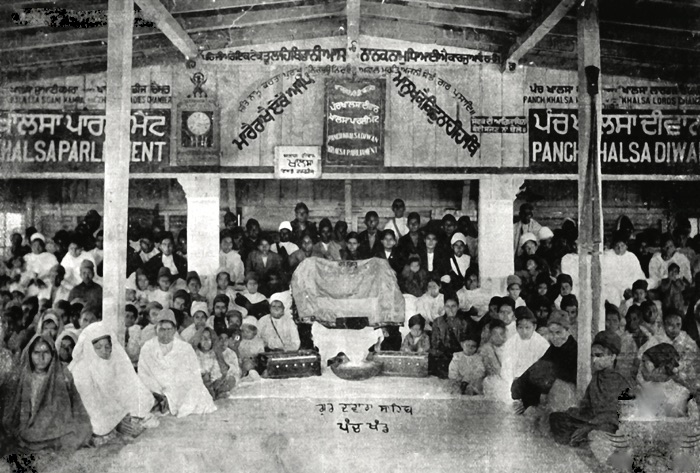
Photograph of a congregation of the Panch Khalsa Diwan, established by Teja Singh Bhasaur in 1893. Teja Singh Bhasauria was the first to mandate Sikh women wear a turban.

During the Singh Sabha movement, there was a push to make Sikh women more distinguishable from Hindu and Muslim women in-order to consolidate and standardize a separate Sikh identity. The Panch Khalsa Diwan, a radical faction on the fringes of the Singh Sabha movement led by Teja Singh Bhasaur, advocated for both of its male and female members to wear a turban. Women who refused to wear the turban were not allowed to become initiated by the Panch Khalsa Diwan. However, the faction eventually was sidelined by the dominant Tat Khalsa faction of the movement and disappeared. However, the Panch Khalsa Diwan's practice of making Sikh women wear a turban influenced Bhai Randhir Singh, founder of the Akhand Kirtani Jatha, who adopted the practice of Sikh women wearing a turban. Yogi Bhajan, founder of the 3HO sect, did not initially mandate women to wear a turban. According to Rami Katz (formerly Ram Das Kaur), the practice of 3HO women wearing a turban began when a small number of 3HO women, including her, started wearing turbans on their second trip to India in 1973 (the first having taken place in 1971 with Yogi Bhajan), and they felt "regal" and "good' wearing it. When these women returned to America from India, they shared their experiences with others.

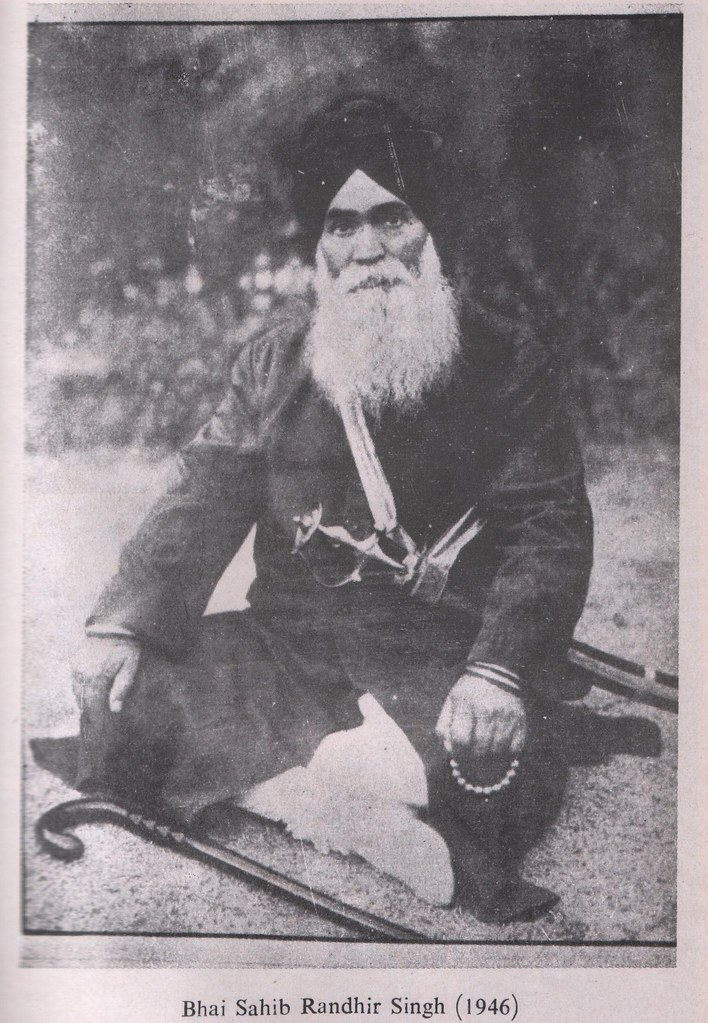
Photograph of Bhai Randhir Singh seated and posed in 1946. Randhir Singh adopted the practice of Sikh women wearing turbans from the earlier Panch Khalsa Diwan of Teja Singh Bhasaur.

The Sikh Coalition states that whilst both Sikh men and women must not cut their hair, it is only required for Sikh men to wear a turban and doing-so is optional for women:

Just like Sikh men, Sikh women are not supposed to cut their hair. In the Rahit Maryada, it is explicitly written that Sikh men wear a turban. There is nothing explicitly written about women, except that the turban is optional

— The Sikh Coalition, FAQ

Whilst the optionality of Sikh women wearing a turban or not went unquestioned, recently some women, especially feminist Sikhs, are pushing against it and are asking why should the turban be mandated for men but not women. Some Sikh women who choose to wear the turban do so because they feel a sense of empowerment and respect from doing-so and as a means to achieve equality with men. Others opt to wear it as they feel it is a visual marker of being a Sikh. Women tying turbans are mostly younger, diasporic Sikhs living outside of their traditional homeland of Punjab. Meanwhile, in India the practice of women wearing turbans is practically non-existent. However, Sikh women who do wear the turban often face push-back from their families. Many Sikh women from North America in the teaching, consulting, and finance industries have taken-up wearing the turban as a symbol of gender equality. Sikh women who do wear a turban still wear a dupatta over their turban rather than a turban-alone. However, Sikh women wearing turbans may be misunderstood as being either "religious zealots" or "radical feminists" by others. Women who wear turbans may also be held to higher religious standards than their peers, and face pressure to live-up to others expectations as a result or face harsher criticism from their community.

== Sects ==
The Akhand Kirtani Jatha enforces the turban on its female members. However, the AKJ remains on the margins of mainstream Sikhism but has a strong online-presence. The 3HO sect (and its sister-organization, the Sikh Dharma of the Western Hemisphere) practices women wearing white-turbans. Many 3HO members are Western converts to Sikhism who became Sikhs due to the teachings of Yogi Bhajan in the 1970's and 1980's. SikhNet, a popular Sikh website, is operated by the 3HO sect and features photographs of Sikh women donning turbans. However, beyond the AKJ and 3HO, the practice of Sikh women wearing turbans has entered mainstream Sikhism.

== Scholarly views ==
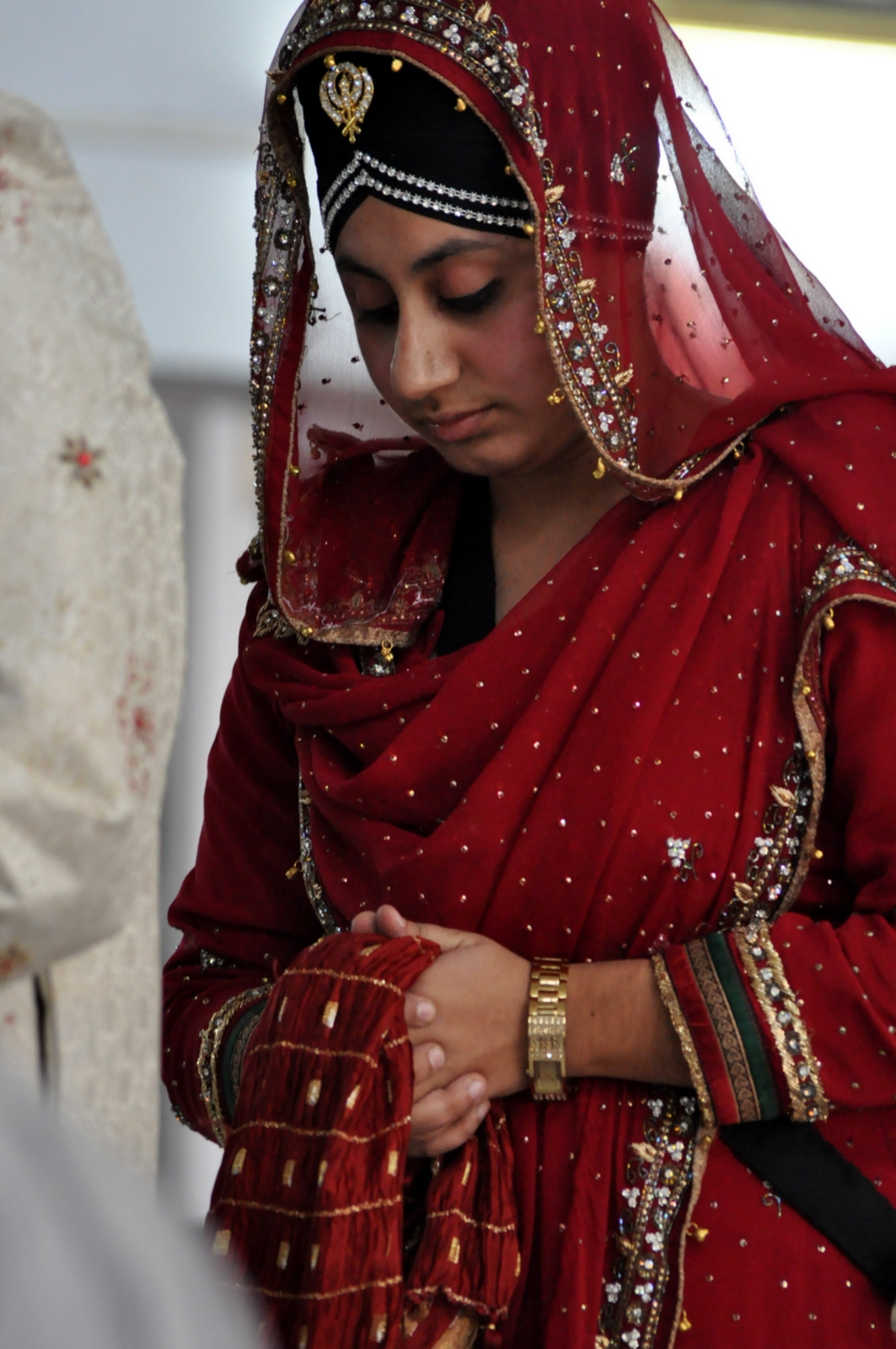
Photograph of a Sikh bride in red shalwar kameez and black turban with khanda, 2011

According to Cynthia Mahmood and Stacy Brady, some Sikh women are appropriating the traditional turban and its symbolism to "renegotiate their personal, cultural, and religious identity" and that the turban is being used by these women to "reflect changing ideas about gendered identities in Sikhism" to create a dialogue regarding representation, power-sharing, and sibling-hood (classically referred to as "brotherhood") within Sikhism.

Nikky-Guninder Kaur Singh has criticized the push for Sikh women to wear turbans and believes it should be a personal choice rather than an obligation. She states that the traditional dupatta is already sufficient in maintaining a woman's kesh. Instead, she asks why men are not being asked to wear chunni instead and that there is a discarding of the traditional dupatta as if traditional femininity must be moved away from toward a masculine marker like the turban. However, she also states that women who opt to wear a turban should not be characterized as representing "Western feminism" by members of their own community, nor should they be viewed as representing "backwards fundamentalism" by outsiders. She concludes with "It is the deep-seated notions of male hegemony that have to disappear rather than women's hair beneath a turban."

According to Pal Ahluwali, the global Sikh diaspora can be divided into broad categories: the "old" diaspora, born out of the age of colonial capital, and "new" diaspora, those who are part of the age of globalization. Doris R. Jakobsh connects women wearing turbans to the "new" diaspora that is "reformulating, recasting, redefining of the 'signs' of Sikh female devotionalism, spirituality and piety". She ties the increasing trend of diasporic Sikh women wearing turbans to the practice of veiling within Islam, which identifies a Muslim woman, as an analogous Sikh marker of a Sikh woman and the identity and status associated with it. Jakobsh states that the turban showcases the contrast between different bifocals, the Sikh from the non-Sikh, the untraditional to the traditional, the devoted from the undevoted, the "manly" or androgynous from the feminine.

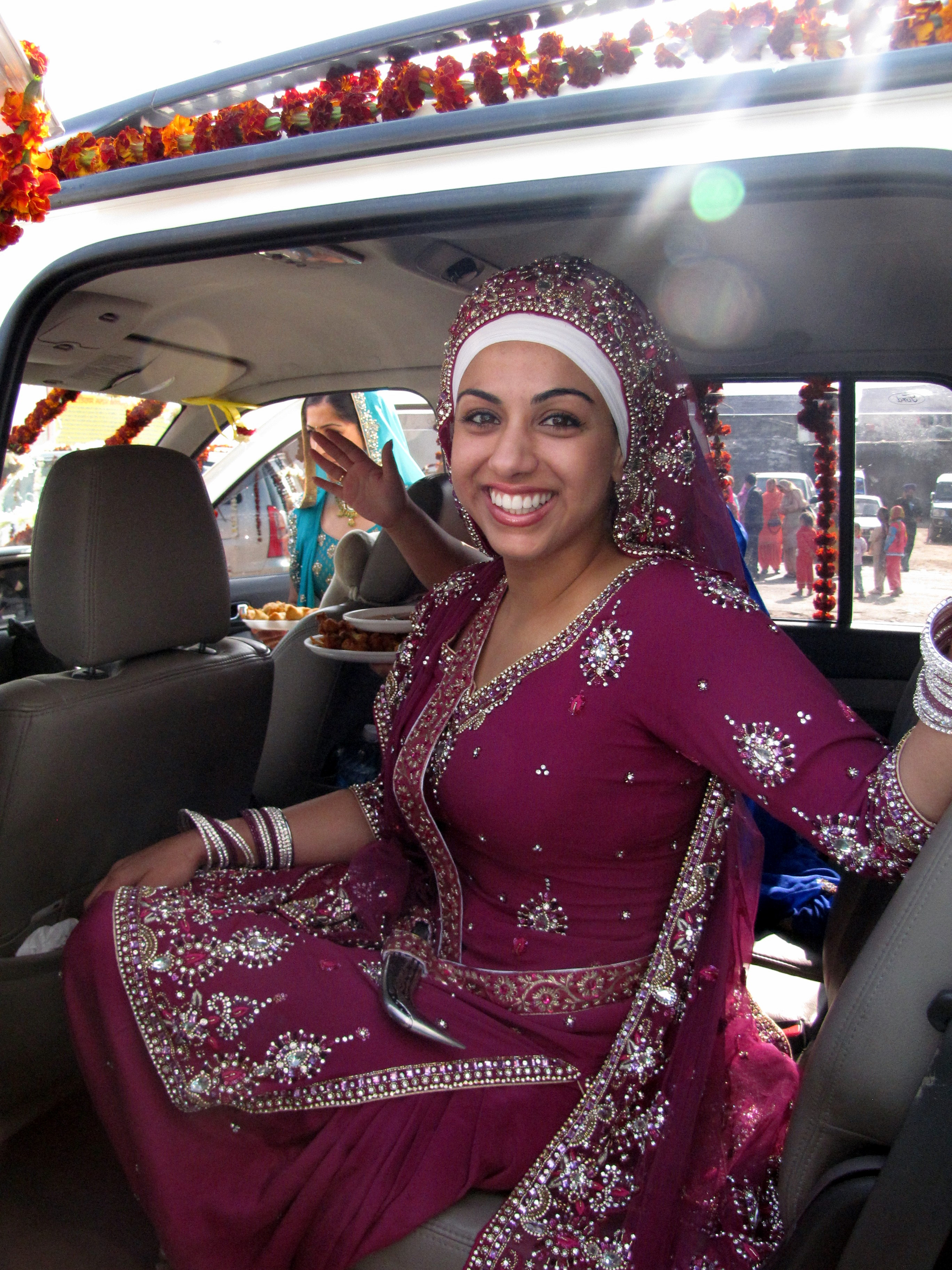
Photograph of a baptized Sikh woman wearing a turban under a dupatta and donning a kirpan, December 2008

Women wearing turbans also developed as a means for Sikh women to be distinguished from other South Asian women in multicultural societies. Thus, it is a means of Sikhs further developing their own ethno-religious cultural identity in diverse environments. This is comparable to how after Operation Blue Star and the anti-Sikh riots in the 1980s, many Sikh women in the United Kingdom began to wear shalwar kameez instead of saris, to distinguish themselves from Hindu women. This is an example of the formation of an in-group that is distinct from out-groups, with wearing a particular garment or clothing being a marker of being a fellow member of an in-group. Furthermore, many Sikh women who wear the traditional dupattas are mistaken for Muslim women wearing hijabs or niqabs, thus some Sikh women may opt to wear a turban as a further marker of them being a Sikh rather than being mistaken as a Muslim.

== See also ==
- Head coverings in Abrahamic faiths:
  - Head covering for Jewish women
  - Head covering for Christian women
  - Head covering for Muslim women
