= Patiala Shahi Pagg =

Common turban style for Sikh men

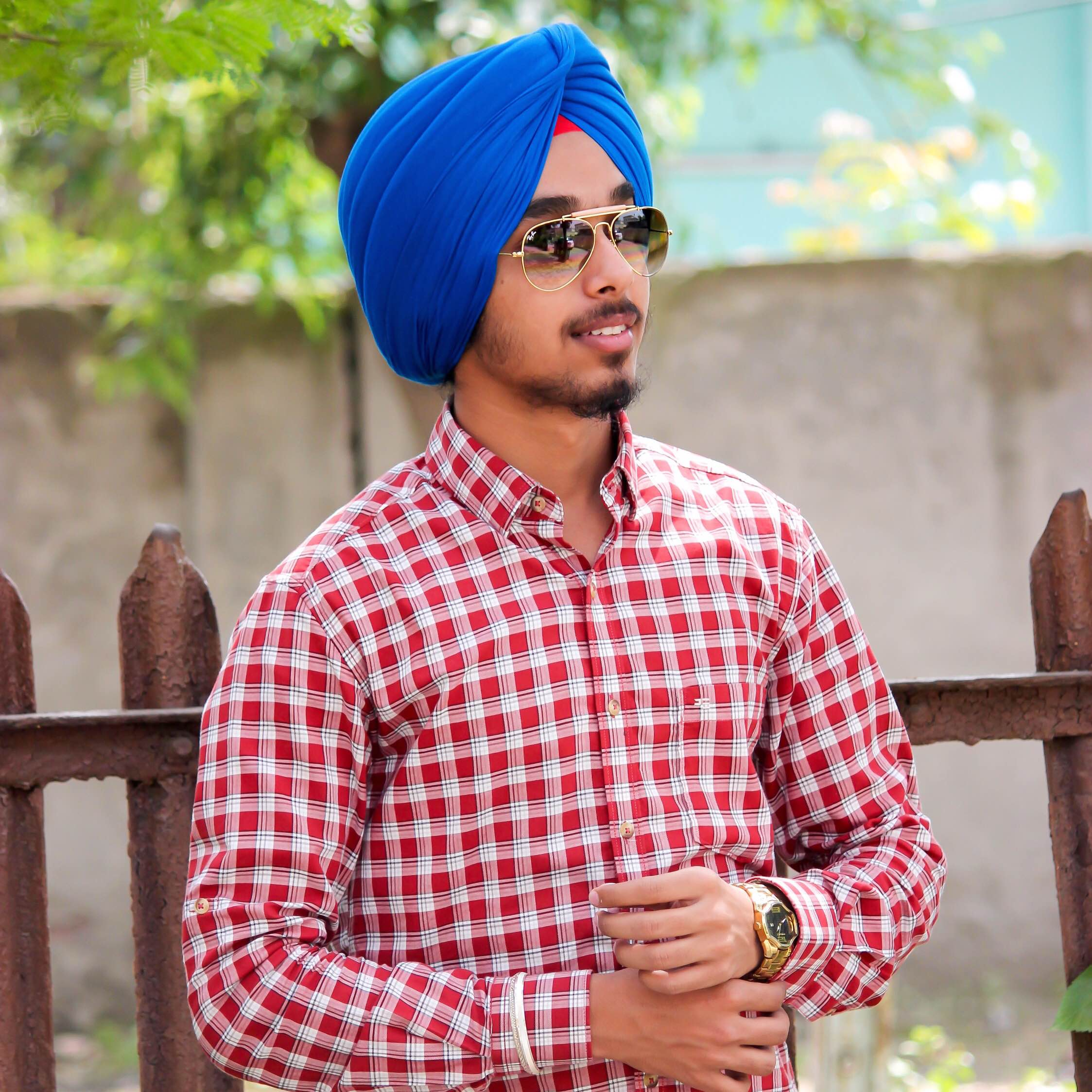
A man wearing Patiala Shahi turban (pagg)

Patiala Shahi is a style of turban (pagg) common among Sikh men, originating in Punjab, India.

"Patiala Shahi" literally means "Patiala royal": this style of turban was worn by Bhupinder Singh, the ruler of Patiala State.

It is one of the two prominent styles of Sikh turbans from the Punjab Plain area, the other being the "Ludhiana style" (apart from these two, another prominent style is the "beaked" kind originating from the Pothohar Plateau area). The Patiala Shahi style has "layers of folded cloth (laṛ) on both sides of the turban", unlike the Ludhiana style, which has cloth on only one side. It is quite distinct from other pagri (pagg) styles of other Indian states.

== See also ==
- Dress code
