= Thatha =

Type of cloth used by some Sikhs

Thatha or Thathi (beard band) is a type of cloth used by some Sikhs to fix their beards. This consists of spraying the beard with hair spray or beard spray, then tying it with rubber or beard pin. A thathi is tied on the chin. This process takes 30 minutes to an hour.

Some Sikhs contend that the question of open versus fixed beard is not relevant. They contend that Guru Gobind Singh told Sikhs to keep uncut hair, and they maintain their beards by sporting uncut beards.
