= Patka =

Sikh headgear

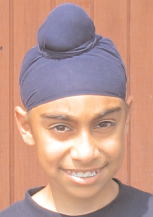
A Sikh boy with a rishi knot wearing a patka.

Patka is a Sikh headgear in lieu of the full Sikh turban. It is commonly worn by Sikh sportsmen and young Sikh boys. Patka is a square piece of cotton, usually with four strings (one attached to each corner) for tying.

== Patka in sports ==
Patkas are commonly tied by Sikh sportsmen due to their stability, especially those playing cricket and field hockey. The Patka is tied a bun behind their head instead of a Sikh joora (at the top of their head). This is commonly tied by cricketers such as Monty Panesar and Harbhajan Singh. Sikh separatist leader Gurpatwant Singh Pannun is known for his wearing of patka.

In 2014 there was a row with FIBA about two Sikh Indian players, Amritpal Singh and Amjyot Singh wearing patkas during the FIBA Asia Cup. In 2017 FIBA lifted the patka ban. In 2018 Indian wrestler Jashkawar Gill was denied the participation in a tournament in Turkey for his refusal to replace his patka with a women-style tying of hair allowed by the United World Wrestling rules.

== Gallery ==
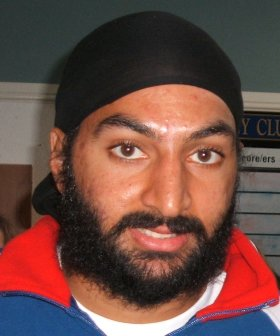
English cricketer Monty Panesar wearing a patka

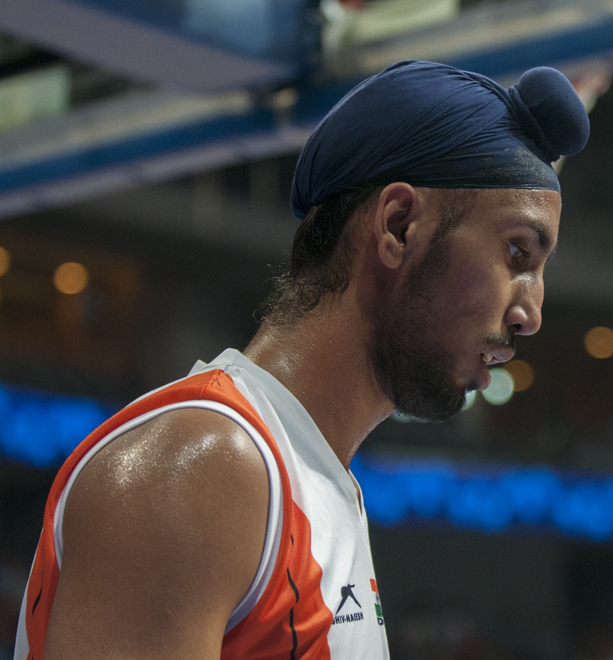
Indian basketball player Amjyot Singh wearing a patka.

== See also ==
- Rumāl
- Bandana
- Patka helmet
