= Rumāl =

Loose piece of cloth used as headgear which is smaller than turban

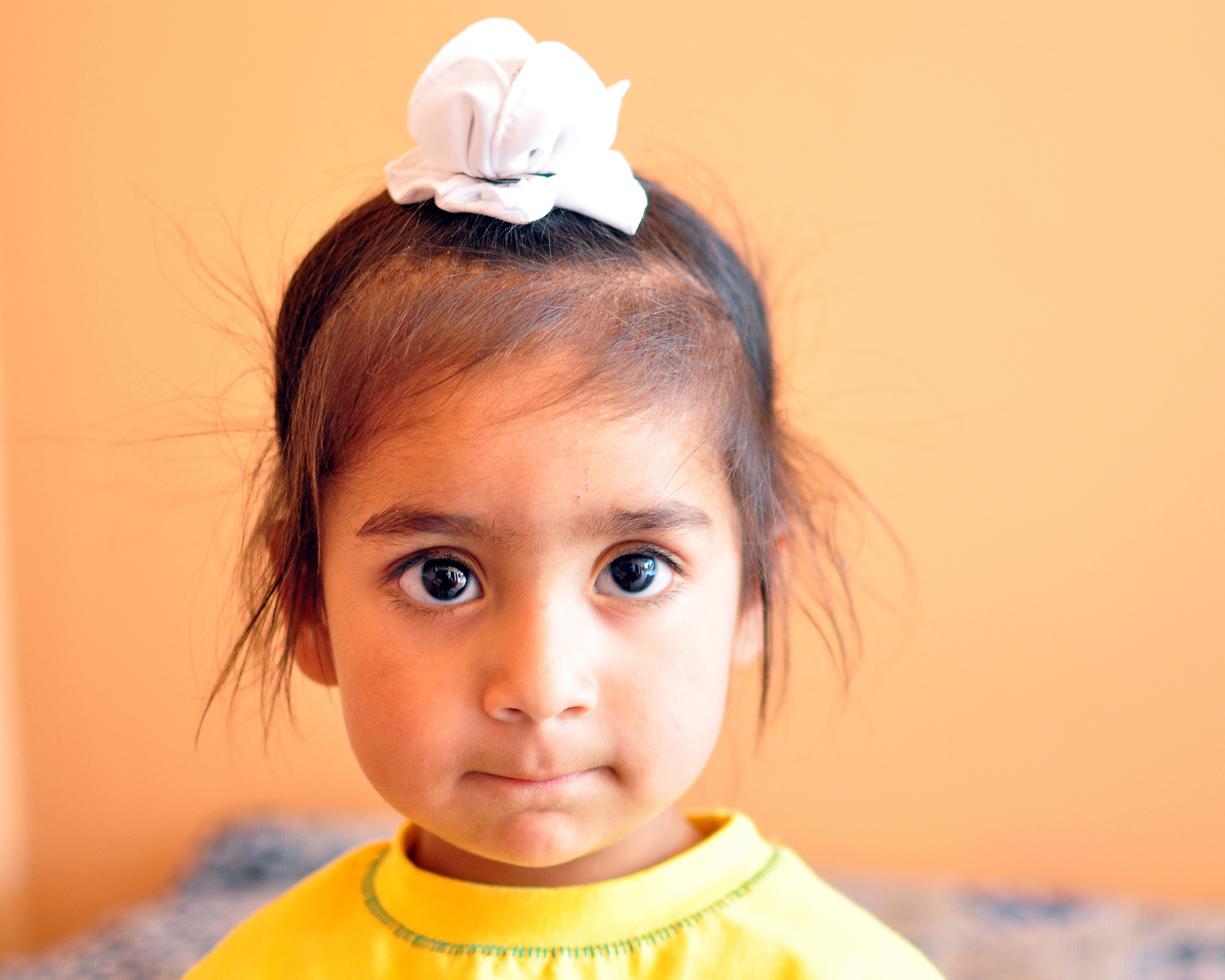
Sikh boy wearing rumāl.

A rumāl (Punjabi: ਰੁਮਾਲ) is a piece of clothing similar to a handkerchief or bandana. It is worn by men who cut their hair and other guests when they are in a gurdwara. Covering the head is respectful in Sikhism and if a man is not wearing a turban, then a rumāl must be worn before entering the gurdwara. Rumāls are also worn by Sikh children on their topknot called joora, and by Sikh males while engaging in athletic activities.

Within Sikhism, a Sikh male child's uncut hair remains plaited until around the age of 5, when it is tied in a knot and covered in a cloth (such as a rumal or patka).

In most gurdwaras, there is often a basket of rumāls outside for welcoming in more guests. If there are no rumāls supplied by the gurdwara then a clean and plain handkerchief is the most suitable cloth to use.

Outside the context of Sikhism, a rumāl is simply the Urdu, Hindi, Nepali and Bengali word for handkerchief, and will be understood as such. Its association with Sikhism is not implied.

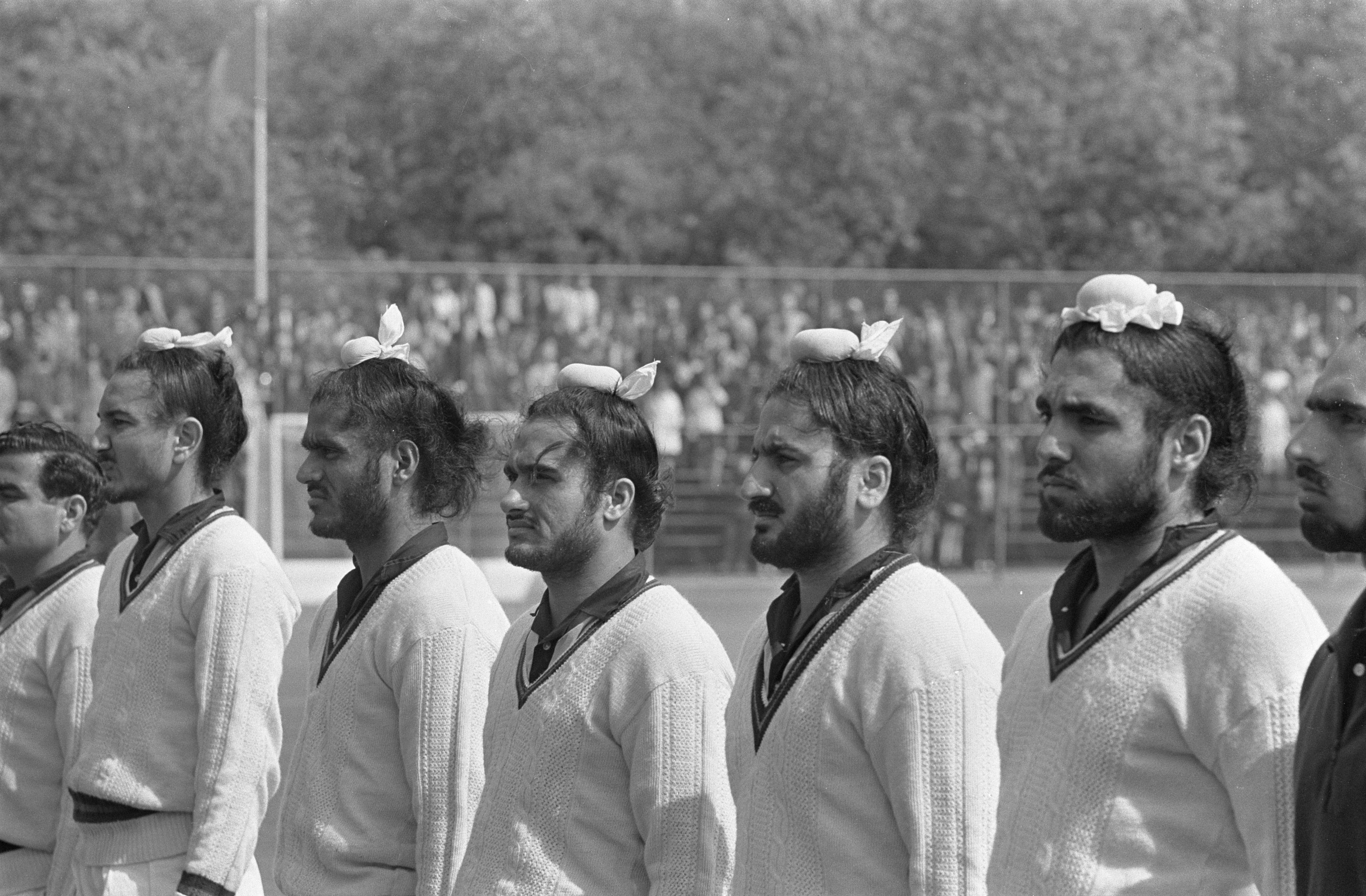
India field hockey players before the start of the match, 1967

== See also ==
- Patka
