= Hindu rituals after death =

Hindu tradition

Hindu rituals after death, including Vedic rituals after death, are ceremonial rituals in Hinduism, one of the samskaras (rite of passage) based on Vedas and other Hindu texts, performed after the death of a human being for their moksha and consequent ascendance to Svarga (heaven). Some of these vary across the spectrum of Hindu society.

== Shmashana – the cremation or burial ground ==
The cremation ground is called Shmashana (in Sanskrit), and traditionally it is located near a river, if not on the river bank itself. Those who can afford it may go to special sacred places like Kashi (Varanasi), Haridwar, Prayagraj (Allahabad), Srirangam, Brahmaputra on the occasion of Ashokashtami and Rameswaram to complete this rite of immersion of ashes into the water.

Some of the cremations are performed at ghats.

=== Antyesti – the cremation ===
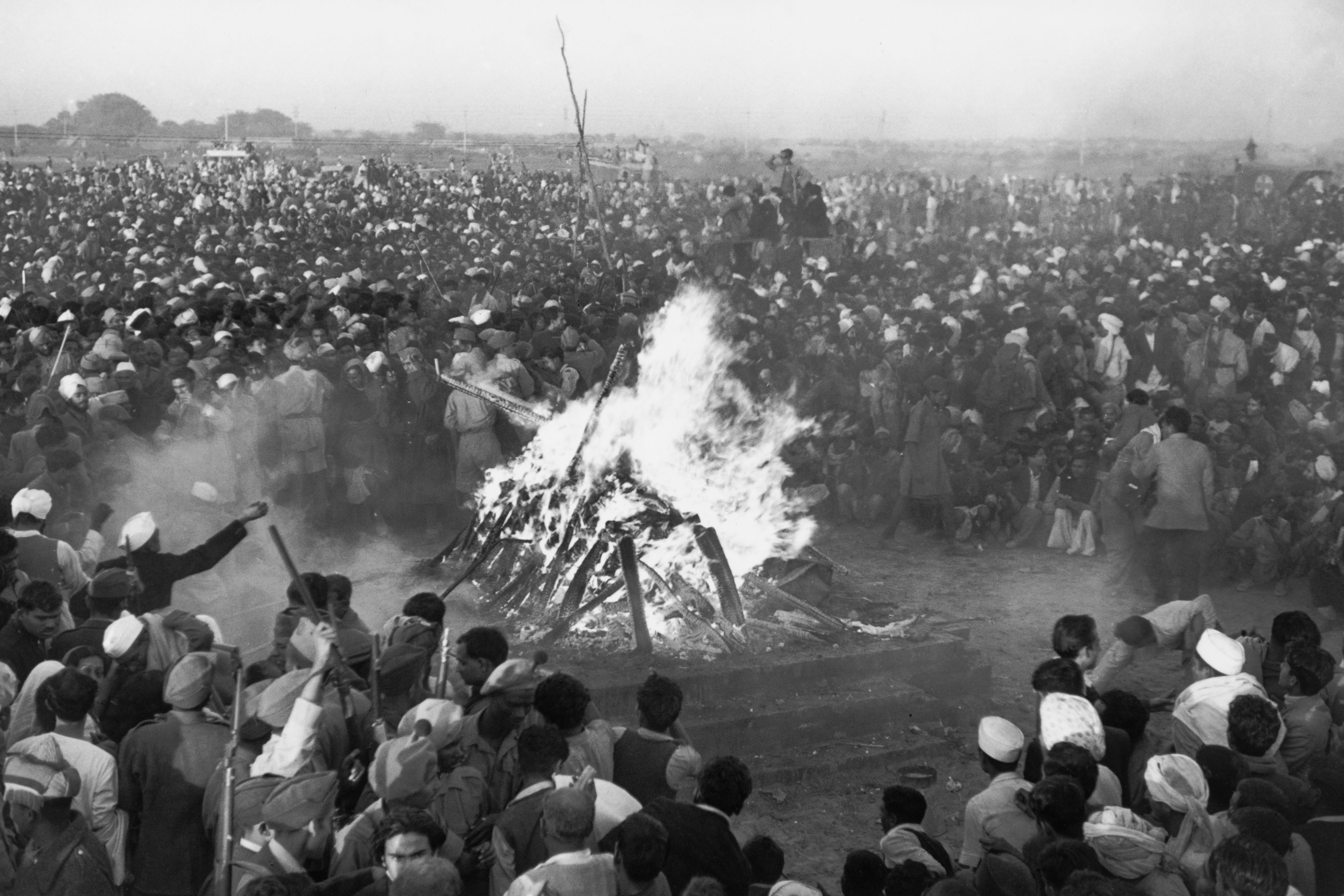
Cremation of Mahatma Gandhi at Rajghat, 31 January 1948. It was attended by Sardar Vallabh Bhai Patel, Jawaharlal Nehru, Lord and Lady Mountbatten, Maulana Azad, Dr Ambedkar, Rajkumari Amrit Kaur, Sarojini Naidu and other national leaders. His son Devdas Gandhi lit the pyre.

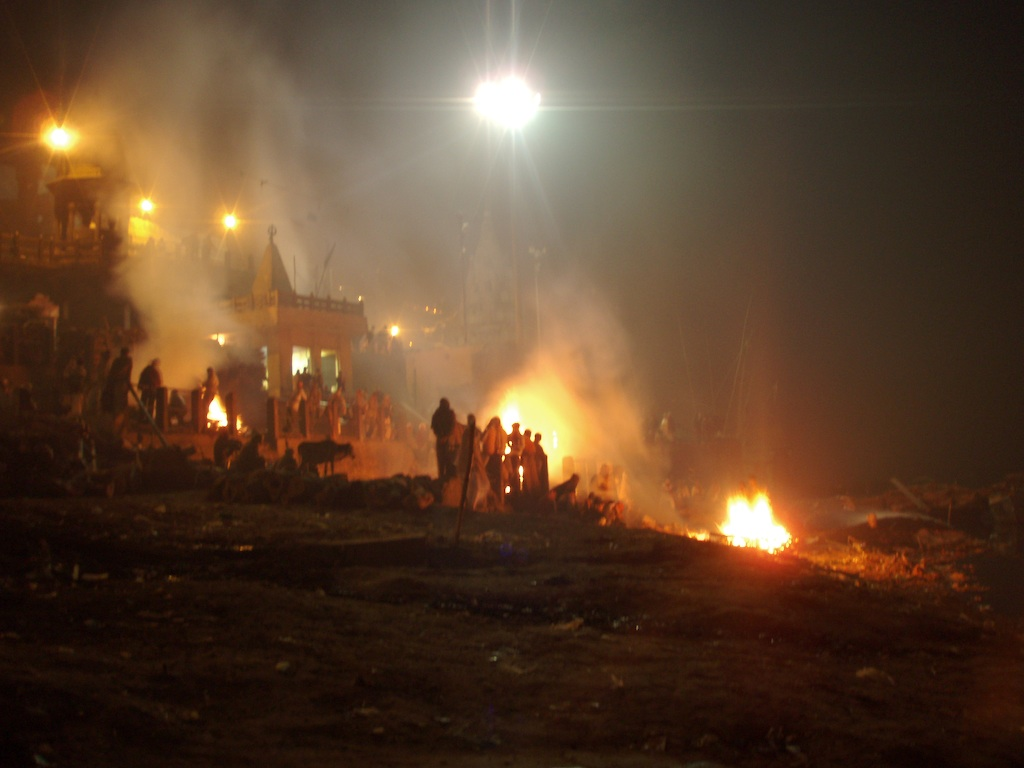
Burning ghats of Manikarnika, at Varanasi, India.

The Antyesti ceremonial offerings vary across the spectrum of Hindu society. Some of the popular rituals followed in Vedic religions after the death of a human being, for his or her peace and ascent to heaven are as follows.

The last rites are usually completed within a day of death. While practices vary among sects, generally, his or her body is washed, sandalwood paste and turmeric are applied on the body, wrapped in a dhoti for a man and a saree for woman. The big toes are tied together with a string and a tilaka (red, yellow, or white mark) is placed on the forehead. A bed is made out of bamboo sticks on which the deceased is taken to the shmashana. The dead adult's body is carried to the cremation ground near a river or water, by family and friends, and placed on a pyre with feet facing north.

The eldest son, or a male mourner, or a priest – called the lead cremator or lead mourner – then bathes himself, and his hair is cut leaving only one strand of hair called the shikha before leading the cremation ceremony. He circumambulates the dry wood pyre with the body, says a eulogy or recites a hymn, and places sesame seeds or rice called pind on the deceased's chest, hand and legs. He sprinkles the body and the pyre with ghee (clarified butter), then draws three lines signifying Yama (deity of the dead), Kala (time, deity of cremation) and the dead. Prior to lighting the pyre, an earthen pot is filled with water, and the lead mourner circles the body with it, before lobbing the pot over his shoulder so it breaks near the head. Once the pyre is ablaze, the lead mourner and the closest relatives may circumambulate the burning pyre one or more times. The ceremony is concluded by the lead cremator, during the ritual, is kapala kriya, or the ritual of piercing the burning skull with a stave (bamboo fire poker) to make a hole or break it, in order to release the spirit. All those who attend the cremation, and are exposed to the dead body or cremation smoke take a shower as soon as possible after the cremation, as the cremation ritual is considered unclean and polluting. The cold collected ash from the cremation is later consecrated to the nearest river or sea.

In some regions, the male blood members of the deceased shave their head on the 9th day called as nauvar, and then invite all friends and relatives, on the thirteenth (13th) day, to eat a meal together in remembrance of the deceased called as Tehrvi Sanskar. This day, in some communities, also marks a day when the poor and needy are offered food in memory of the dead.

=== Burial in Hinduism ===
Apart from the cremation method, several sects in Hinduism follow the practice of Samadhi of the dead. In some sects, the important sadhus (mendicants) are Samadhist. The preparatory rituals are more or less similar to cremation viz, washing the body, applying vibuthi or chandam on the forehead of the deceased etc., but instead of cremating, the deceased is buried. The body is either placed in a sleeping position or in some Shaivite and tribal traditions is in the padmasana sitting position with legs folded and arms resting on the thigh simulating a meditative position. The Samadhi pit is prepared in the community samadhi ground called the shamshana, usually situated outside the city or village. Some affluent will bury their dead in their own field. The burial pit for the sleeping position is generally three feet in width and six feet in length and for the sitting position, it is three feet by three feet. As a rule of thumb among various sects, the saints are buried in sitting positions in a separate place where later on a samadhi is built which becomes a place of worship. For example, followers of Ayyavazhi sect Samadhist the body, facing the geographic north in a padmasana position, without coffins and it is covered by sand or namam (sacred soil) as an act of austerity for the unfolding of Dharma Yukam.

== Post-antyesti rituals ==
=== Niravapanjali – immersion of ashes ===
Niravapanjali is a sacred ritual in Hinduism where after the cremation rites, the ashes are ceremonially immersed in holy water by the closest relatives, so that the soul may rise to heaven. In Hinduism, king Bhagiratha is described to have performed a tapasya to bring down the river Ganges upon earth, so that he could immerse the ashes of sixty thousand of his slain ancestors in her sacred waters.

=== Tarpana – sacred offering to deities for entrance to heaven ===
Tarpana is a sacred ritual whereupon the closest relatives make a sacred offering to deities so that the departed soul may enter Svarga. In Hindu mythology, Parashurama offered a tarpana for his father Jamadagni with the blood of his father's killer.

Tarpana is usually performed at a holy site such as ghats on sacred rivers or sites.

=== Rasam Pagri – appointment of successor on 4th day after death ===
Rasam Pagri, prevalent in Punjab and Rajasthanis, is conducted upon the death of the eldest male member in a family to appoint his heir, in which the eldest surviving male member of the family ties a turban (pagri) on his head in the presence of the extended family or clan. Ceremony is usually performed by the father of the wife of the eldest, surviving male member. The ceremony usually takes place on the fourth day from the day of funeral rites (Antima Samskara, also known as Uthala), or on the thirteenth day, Tehravin. The turban signifies honor of the family, and the ceremony signifies the transition of responsibility for the protection and welfare of the family from the deceased to the surviving oldest male member.

=== Pind Sammelan or Terahvin – 13th day of death ===
Pind Sammelan, also called Spindi or terahvin in North India, is a ritual performed in Hinduism on the 13th day of death of somebody. This ritual is performed to place the departed soul with their ancestors and deities. It is believed that before the ritual, the departed soul is a preta (evil spirit), and after performing this ritual, the soul will become a pitr and will be included in the ancestors.

== Genealogy registers ==
Many people visit Hindu pilgrimage sites to perform, Śrāddha ceremonies, like Pehowa, Kurukshetra, Haridwar, Gokarneshwar, Nashik, Gaya etc. where they also update their genealogy registers maintained by pandits.

- Hindu genealogy registers at Chintpurni, Himachal Pradesh
- Hindu genealogy registers at Haridwar
- Hindu genealogy registers at Jawalamukhi, Himachal Pradesh
- Hindu genealogy registers at Kurukshetra, Haryana
- Hindu genealogy registers at Peohwa, Haryana
- Hindu genealogy registers at Trimbakeshwar, Maharashtra
- Hindu genealogy registers at Varanasi

== Ancestor worship ==
=== Pitrs – the ancestors ===
The pitrs (the forefathers) are the spirits of the departed ancestors in Hinduism, who are usually remembered annually and venerated.

=== Jathera, Dhok or Samadhi- the ancestor's shrines ===
Jathera or Dhok, from jyestha (elder) and dahak (dahak the sacred fire), are samadhi (shrines) dedicated to the worship of ancestors.

=== Śrāddha – annual homage to dead ancestors ===
The Śrāddha ritual is performed to pay homage to one's pitrs, especially to one's dead parents, to express heartfelt gratitude and thanks towards their parents and ancestors, for having helped them to be what they are and praying for their peace. It is performed as a day of remembrance for both the father and mother jointly if the death gap is within one month or separately, on their respective tithi – death anniversaries as per the Hindu calendar. Additionally, it is performed for the entire community of the pitr – both from paternal and maternal side – collectively during the Pitru Paksha or Shraddha paksha (Fortnight of ancestors), right before Sharad Navaratri in autumn.

=== Pitru Paksha – sacred fortnight for annual ancestral worship ===
Pitru Paksha is a 16–lunar day period in Hindu calendar when Hindus pay homage to their pitrs, especially through food offerings.

== See also ==
- Hindu pilgrimage sites
- Samskara (rite of passage)
- Yatra
