= Rasam Pagri =

Ceremony in Northern India

Rasam Pagri (रसम पगड़ी), also known as Rasam Dastar, is a social ceremony, prevalent in the northern part of India. The ceremony is conducted upon the death of the eldest male member in a family, in which the eldest surviving male member of the family ties a turban (pagri) on his head in the presence of the extended family or clan. According to the Hindu traditions, the ceremony is usually performed by the father of the wife of the eldest, surviving male member. The ceremony usually takes place on the fourth day from the day of funeral rites (Antim Sanskar, also known as Uthala), or on the thirteenth day, Tehravin. The turban signifies honor of the family, and the ceremony signifies the transition of responsibility for the protection and welfare of the family from the deceased to the surviving oldest male member. (While this is predominantly the case, in the Hindu religious scriptures, it is actually the male member who "gives fire" to the body of the deceased who is entitled to wear the turban. As per tradition, it is the oldest surviving son who performs this final rite.) It is usually performed on the tenth day following the funeral.

First pagri ceremony (known as Dastar bandi) is popular in India representing love from maternal family to the son born to their daughter. In sikh families, st the age of 5 or 7 boy's maternal uncle and maternal grandfather bring a pagg and dastarbandi is done (representing welcoming the child to 1st responsible step toards sikhism, offering a feeling of growing up, endless love from Nanka (maternal family) parivar.

== Etymology ==
Rasam means ceremony in different languages of India, including Hindi, the most widely spoken. It is derived from the Arabic word rasm meaning procedure or method. Rasam Pagri literally means the ceremony of the turban.

== Reform movements ==
Some communities have decided to end the custom of Rasam Pagri because it is associated with mrityu-bhoj (feast marking the end of the mourning period).

In some reform-minded families, the daughters have been given the Pagri.

== See also ==
- Dastar bandi
- Sehra bandi
- Turban exchange
- Hindu genealogy registers at Haridwar
