= Dastar bandi =

Turban-tying ceremony

A dastar bandi

Dastar bandi, also known as the dastar sajauna, is a turban-tying ceremony practiced in the Indian subcontinent, such as by Sufis, where it marks the succession of religious leadership, and Sikhs, where it is an adolescent rite-of-passage.

== Description ==
=== Sufism ===
For Sufis, it is usually done within a Khanqah of a particular Pir or Mashaykh as a coronation ceremony to denote the successor of the Sajjada Nasheen of the institution.

=== Sikhism ===
Within Sikhism, a Sikh male child's uncut hair remains plaited until around the age of 5, when it is tied in a knot and covered in a cloth (such as a rumal or patka). Eventually to mark the succession into symbolic adulthood, the dastar bandi is performed when a boy comes-of-age (with varying commencement ages depending on family but usually it happens between the ages of 11 to 16) and a proper turban is first tied on him (usually after an ardaas), often either performed communally (in the presence of the sangat) at a gurdwara or at the home, accompanied by the Guru Granth Sahib (with a granthi), kirtan and karah parshad. Commonly it is an older relative or sibling, parent, or the granthi tying the first turban on the boy's head. Either an akhand path or kullha path is performed to accompany the ceremony. The most popular colour of turban for the occasion is pink. Not all Sikhs perform the ceremony.

== See also ==
- Turban exchange
- Rasam Pagri
- Sehrabandi
- Punjabi wedding traditions
- Turban training centre
