= Turban exchange =

The turban exchange (known as Pagg Vatauna or Pagg Baath) is a custom followed in Punjab (earlier the entire India) wherein two male counterparts enter a brotherly social contract and treat each other's families as the male counterparts of family. The social contract is enforced and looked up upon in society, although it does not have the same status as other ceremonies, it does hold immense cultural significance.

People in Punjab have been and still do exchange turbans with closest friends, once they exchange turbans they become friends for life and forge a permanent brotherly relationship and refer to each other as brother, and their children refer to them as uncle (for example, if elder, Taya or Chacha if younger). Exchanging turbans is a glue that can bind two individuals or families together for generations.

Earlier the tradition of wearing turbans was common throughout India, and each community or sub-caste had a different style of turban, when doing the Turban Exchange the two have to wear each other's turban in that particular style of turban.

== See also ==
- Dastar bandi
- Sehra bandi
- Rasam Pagri
