= Mysore peta =

Type of turban

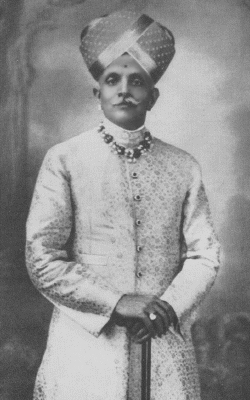
Colourful and royal Mysuru peta worn by Maharaja Krishna Raja IV

The Mysuru peta is an opulent formal turban, originally worn by the Kings of Mysore. It consists of a long strip of cloth such as silk or cotton, that is wound around the head. It may be decorated with a border of gold or silver lace and with ornamental metal pendants.

Since India became independent in 1947, the traditional Mysuru peta has become a symbol of the region's cultural heritage, worn for formal occasions and awarded to distinguished people as a sign of honour, often with a shawl.

== Tradition ==
Wadiyar dynasty rulers wore richly jewelled turbans of silk and gold-threaded lace (jari) to match colourful royal dress. Kings wore the traditional Mysuru peta during meetings of the royal court (Durbar), for public events such as during the Dassara religious festival and at parades for visiting dignitaries.

The Mysuru peta was also worn by the King's senior officials, such as the Prime Minister (dewan). Men attending the King's court were expected to wear the Mysuru peta with a long black coat and white trousers.

== Present Day ==
Mysuru peta turbans are worn as formal attire for events such as weddings, religious gatherings and award ceremonies, particularly in Mysuru and Kodagu.

Students and faculty of universities in Karnataka are encouraged to wear a Mysuru peta for the convocation ceremony, rather than the mortarboard inherited from India's colonial past.

== Gallery ==
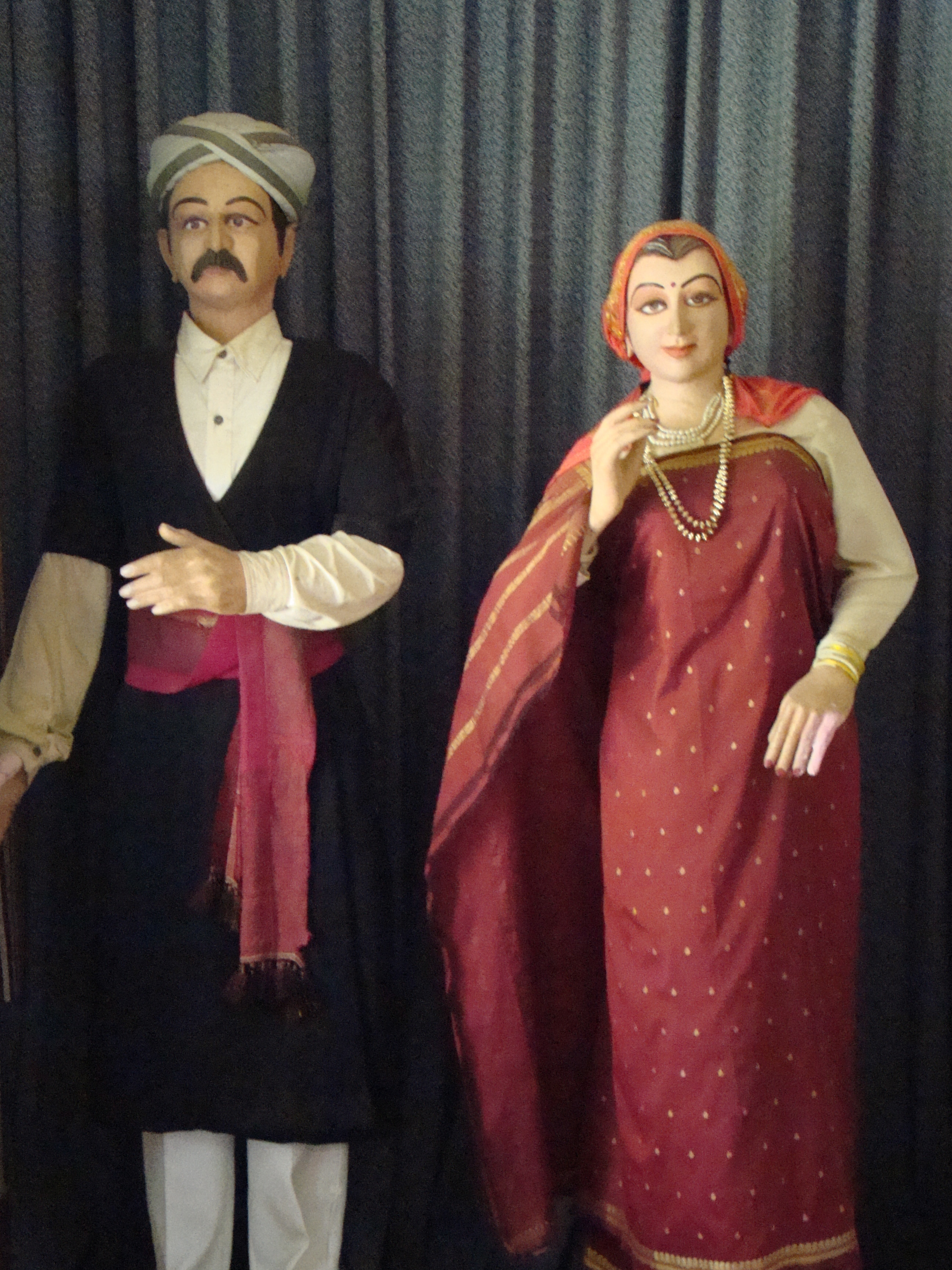
Dolls in Kodava attire of Kodagu

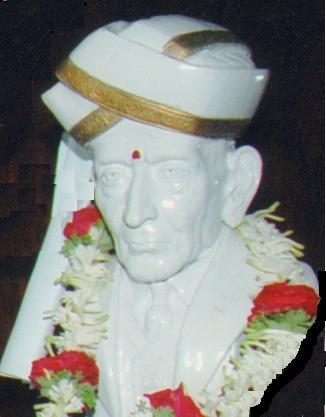
Bharat Ratna Mokshagundam Vishveshwaraiah, Dewan of Mysuru, in traditional Mysore peta worn by top administrators of Mysuru Kingdom

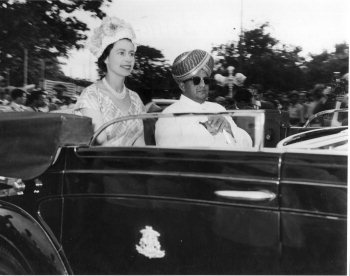
Jayachamrajendra Wodeyar in traditional Mysuru peta with Queen Elizabeth II

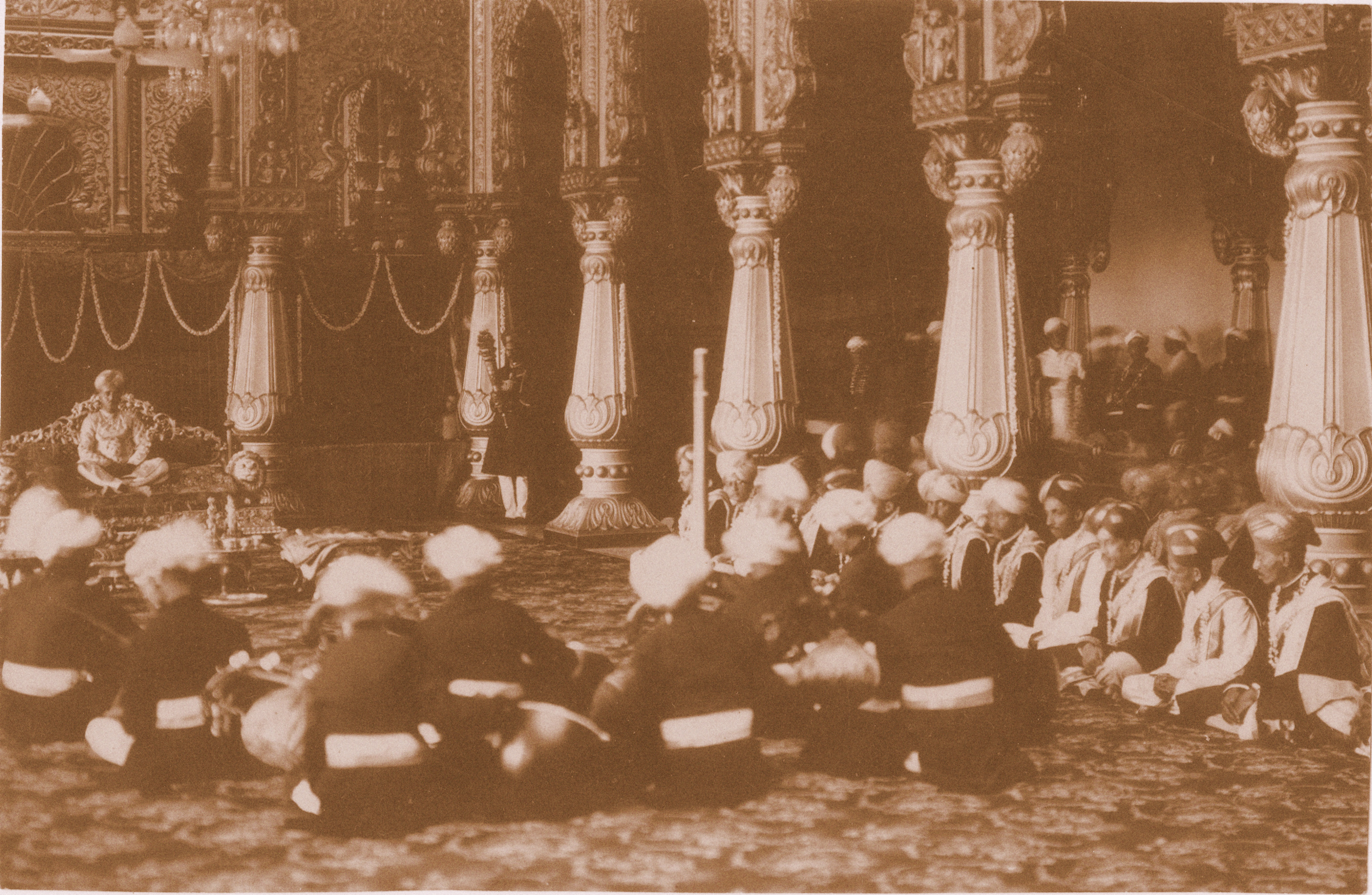
A concert inside Mysuru Palace, with musicians wearing Mysore peta

== See also ==
- Pheta
- Pagri (turban)
