= Terahvin =

Hindu mourning ceremony

Terahvi (Hindi: तेरहवीं, Punjabi: ਤੇਹਰਵੀਂ) refers to the ceremony conducted to mark the final day of mourning after a death by North Indian Hindus, and sometimes Sikhs. The term terahvi means thirteenth, and the ceremony is held on the thirteenth day after the death being mourned. Alms are given to the poor and to priests who help conduct the ceremonies, which can include Puja and havan for Hindus and a concluding recitation of the Guru Granth Sahib for Sikhs. A community function and feast is often organized for the mohalla or village to commemorate the dead person, especially if the deceased was socially prominent.

Terahvi is North Indian term for vedic ritual, Pind Sammelan (also called Spindi).

== See also ==
- Antim Sanskar
- Rasam Pagri
