= Puneri Pagadi =

Type of turban

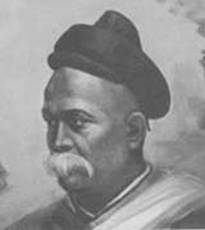
Mahadev Govind Ranade wearing the Puneri pagadi

The Puneri Pagadi is a distinctive style of turban, which is considered as a symbol of pride and honor in the city of Pune. It was introduced two centuries ago. Though it is a symbol of honour, the use of the pagadi has changed over the years and now it is also used on traditional days in colleges. To preserve the identity of the pagadi, there were demands from the locals to grant it a Geographical Indication (GI) status. Their demand was fulfilled and the pagadi became an intellectual property on 4 September 2009.

== History ==
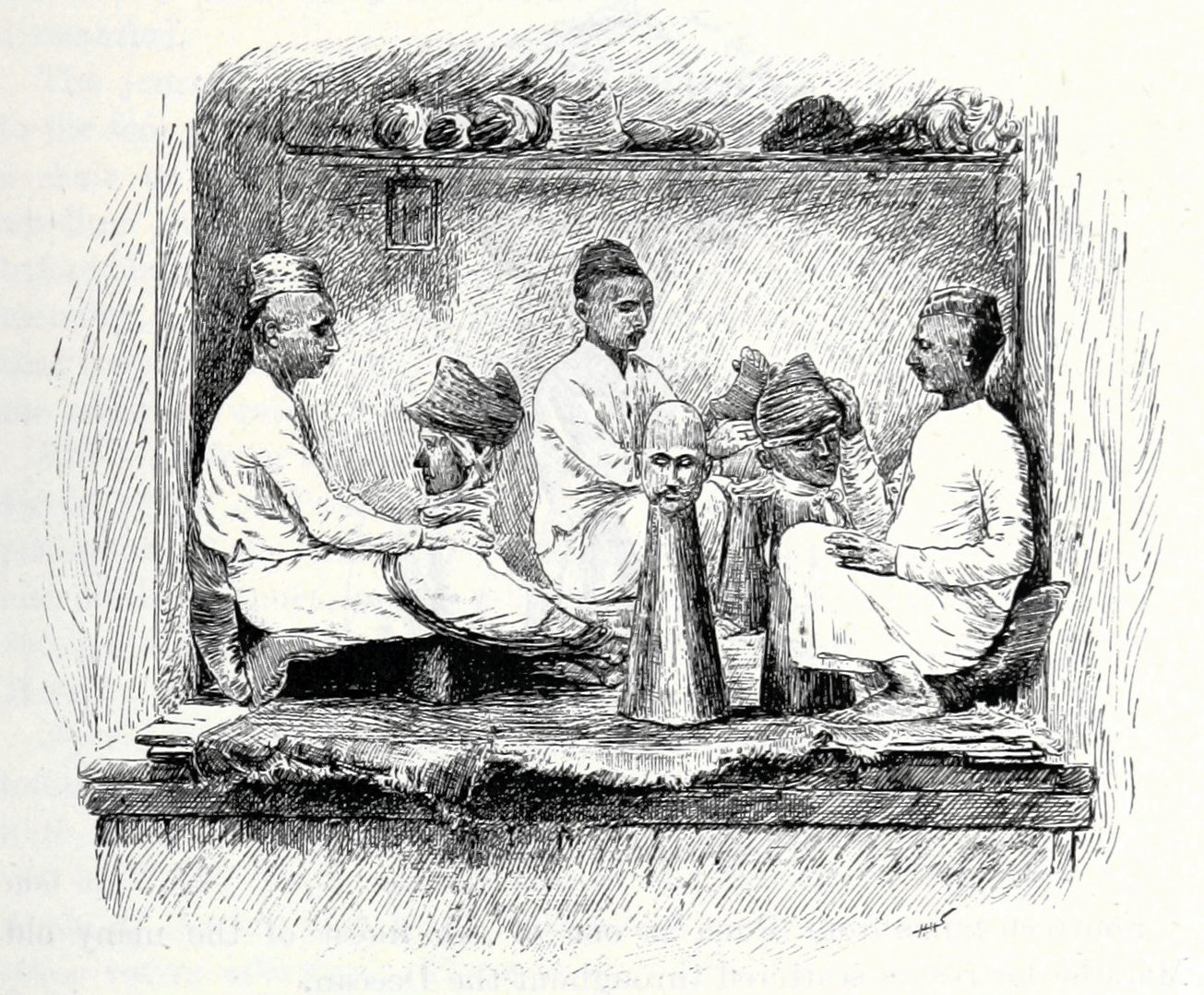
Turban fitters of Pune, 1890

The Puneri-style pagadi was introduced in the 19th century by Mahadev Govind Ranade, a social reformer. Later, it was worn by many leaders like Lokmanya Tilak, J.S. Karandikar, D.D. Sathye, Dr. Vitthalrao Gade, Tatyasaheb Kelkar and Datto Vaman Potdar. The pagadi became more popular in 1973 after the Marathi play, Ghashiram Kotwal.

== Usage ==
The pagadi is used mostly on special occasions like wedding ceremonies and traditional days in schools and colleges. Youngsters wear it while performing the gondhal art form. The pagadi, being a symbol of honour, is also used as a souvenir. It also finds usage in period films and theatres.

== Granting of intellectual property right ==
The 10-membered Shree Puneri Pagadi Sangh had applied before the Geographical Indication Registry to get a Geographical Indication (GI) tag for the pagadi. Great Mission Group Consultancy, which promotes intellectual property rights filed the application on behalf of them. The aim was to make the pagadi recognizable, preserve its identity and also that of the Puneri culture. Consequently, on 4 September 2009, the Geographical Indication status was given to the headgear and the pagadi became the official cultural identity of Pune.

== See also ==
- Pagri (turban)
- Pheta
