= Pheta =

Type of turban

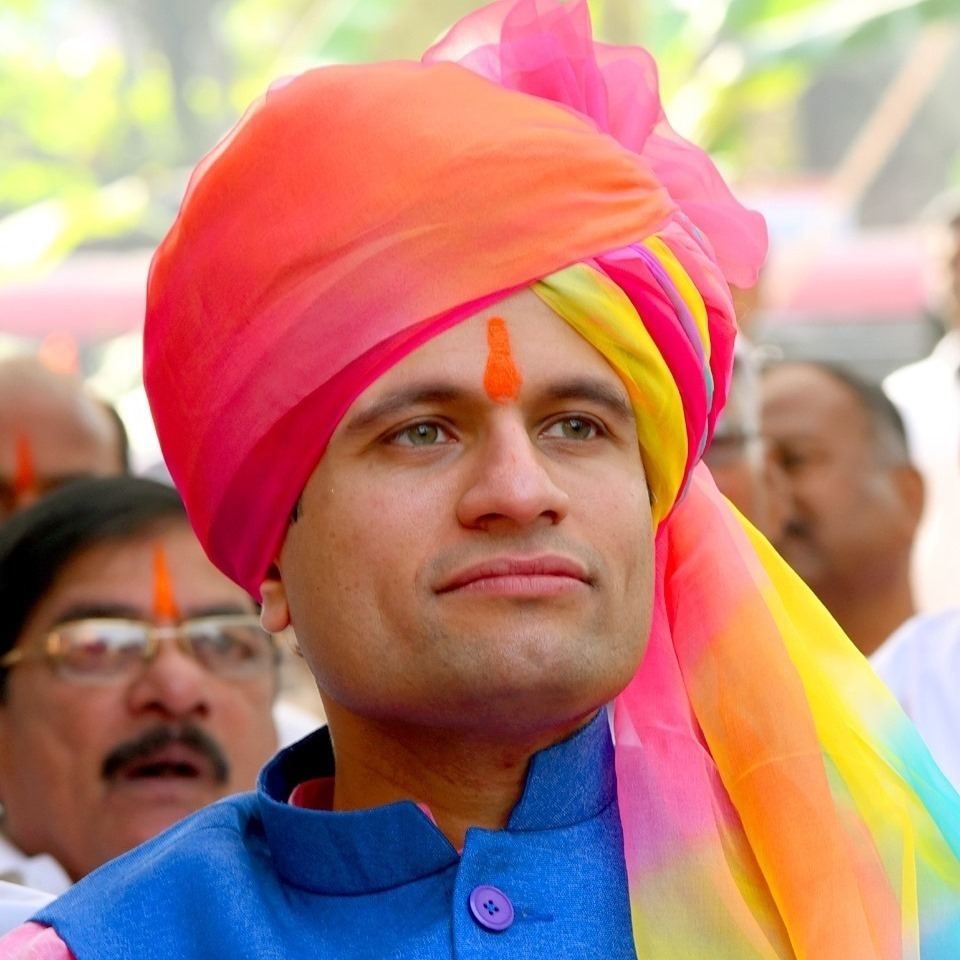
Samarjeetsinh Ghatge in a Marathi Pheta.

The Pheta (Marathi: फेटा) is a traditional Indian headgear consisting of a long piece of cloth wrapped around the head in a specific manner. Historically referred to as ushnish, this attire was worn by both men and women in ancient times. The headgear is known by various regional and stylistic names, including patko, safa, rumal, kosha, mandil, and mundaso.

== Classification ==
Indian headgear is broadly categorized into two distinct types:

- Pheta: A long cloth wrapped and tied directly around the head.
- Pagri (turban): A pre-formed headgear that is permanently shaped and kept intact.

=== Styles based on wrapping ===
The nomenclature of the attire often changes based on the specific configuration of the drape:

- Patko: A style where the front portion rises high on one side and descends on the other.
- Pheta: A style where both sides are elevated while the central section remains deep or hollow.
- Safa: A style where one side of the cloth extends downward, covering the area down to the ear.

== Historical evidence ==
Archaeological findings indicate the long-standing historical presence of this headgear across the Indian subcontinent:

- Ancient sculptures discovered in regions such as Sanchi, Bharhut, Bhaja, Bodh Gaya, Sarnath, and Mathura depict female idols adorned with wrapped headgear on their heads.
- Traditional depictions of deities and mythological figures like Kubera and Yaksha feature similar head adornments.
- A second-century idol of Balarama discovered near Mathura features a headgear style placed over the right ear, closely resembling the modern Rajput safa.

== Variations ==
The style, height, and tightness of the headgear vary significantly across different communities, professions, and geographical regions.

=== Maratha and Brahmin Styles ===
- Maratha: The tightly tied headgear worn by the Maratha people is referred to as a mundaso.
- Brahmin: Brahmin communities feature distinct variations, often characterized by rounded shapes. Notably, a significant stylistic similarity exists between the headgear worn by the Marathi saint Tukaram and that of the Maithili Brahmins of Bihar.

=== Rajput and Rajasthani Style ===
The Rajasthani variant typically utilizes a cloth measuring 15 to 20 cubits in length and 1 cubit in width. One end of the fabric is secured inside or fashioned into a crest (turo), while the opposing end is left to hang loosely. This specific style was historically used by Rajput warriors, subsequently becoming an integral component of military attire.

=== Rumal and Southern Styles ===
The rumal is a distinct variation of the headgear that uses a cloth measuring 12 cubits in length and width. It is wrapped securely around the ears without leaving any loose ends. This large-sized variation is highly prevalent in South India. In the Tamil language, it is designated as urumaali, which is considered the linguistic origin of the word rumal. The headgear worn by members of the Sikh community is also tied in a specialized manner over a rumal.

=== Nobility ===
Historical chiefs (Sardars) and rulers of princely states wore distinct types of headgear that varied significantly in shape and appearance, often designated by names such as kosha and mandil.

== Social context ==
The choice of fabric and style often reflects social roles, occupations, and occasions:

- General public: Common individuals routinely wear plain white headgear or rumals. However, during festive occasions, they opt for vibrant colors and cloths adorned with golden threads (zari).
- Wrestlers and shahirs: Wrestlers and folk singers (shahirs) wear large, majestic headgear. A style featuring a fan-like crest (kalillo) on one side is considered highly aesthetic.

== In media ==
Many of Marathi movies that show historical Maharashtrian and Marathi figures, such as Netaji Palkar, Ayodhyecha Raja, Shree Pundalik, depict the character sporting a pheta in most of the scenes. Some Bollywood actors, including Abhishek Bachchan and Ritesh Deshmukh, wore the Pheta on their wedding day. Bachchan's father, Amitabh Bachchan, also wore a pheta to his son's wedding. The current Prime Minister of India, Narendra Modi is also known for wearing a pheta while addressing the nation on Independence Day.

== Gallery ==
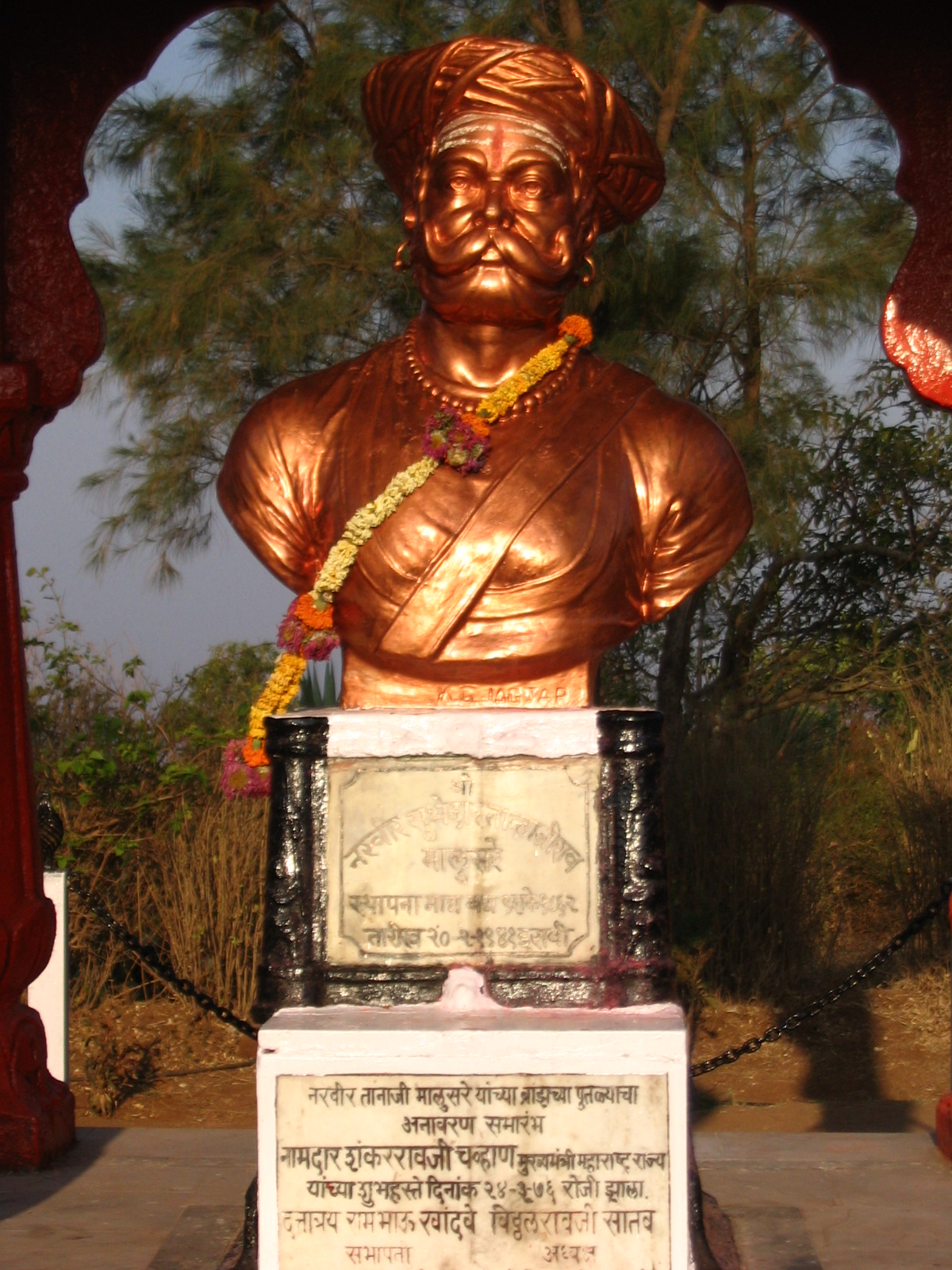
Maratha warrior Tanaji Malusare wearing Mawali pagadi

== See also ==
- Khăn vấn
- Pagri (turban)
- Mysore peta
- Puneri Pagadi
