= Antyesti =

Funeral rites for the dead in Hinduism

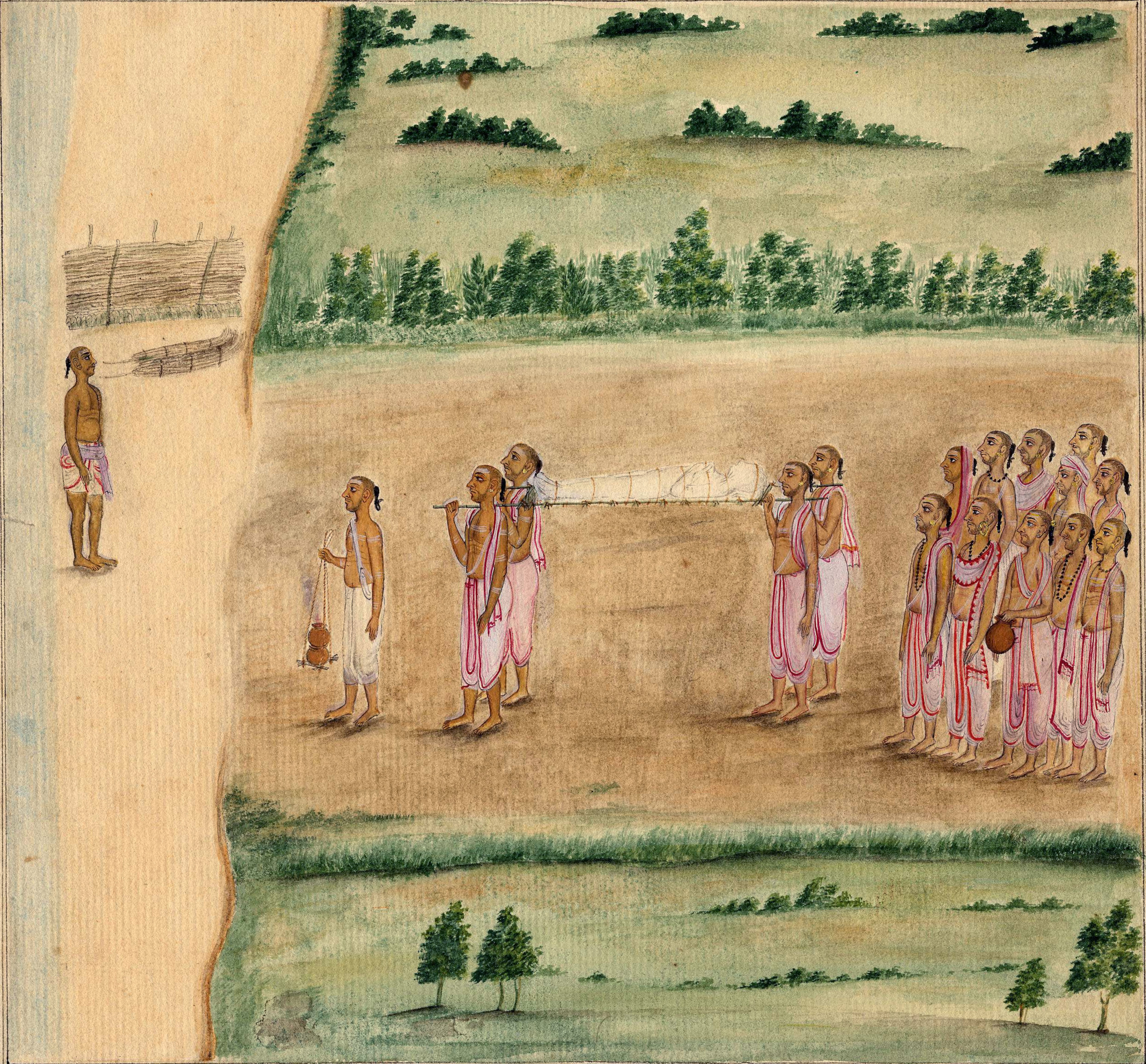
An 1820 painting showing a Hindu funeral procession in south India. The pyre is to the left, near a river, the lead mourner is walking in front, the dead body is wrapped in white and is being carried to the cremation pyre, relatives and friends follow

Antyesti (IAST: Antyeṣṭi, Sanskrit: अन्त्येष्टि), also known as Antima Samskara, Antya-kriya, Anvarohanyya, or as Vahni Samskara, literally means "last sacrifice" or "final auspicious ceremony", and refers to the funeral rites for the dead in Hinduism, which usually involves cremation of the body. Antyesti is traditionally regraded in some Hindu traditions as the final samskaras or life-cycle rite.

The details of the Antyesti ceremony depend on the region, social group, gender and age of the dead.

== Etymology and terminology ==
Antyeṣṭi (अन्त्येष्टि) is a Sanskrit compound of antya, which means "last" and iṣṭi, which means "sacrifice" or "auspicious ceremony". Together, the word means the "last sacrifice". Similarly, the phrase Antima Samskara literally means "last sacred ceremony, or last rite of passage".

Hindu funeral rites are known by a few Sankskrit terms, which includes Antya-kriya, Anvarohanyya, Vahni Samskara and dehanta, which means end of the body. These Sanskrit terms reflect the belief across Hinduism that death puts an end to the physical body, while the self (atman) continues to live on. This is because while the physical body is affected by illness, disease, old age, and decay, the atman is not subject to physical decay, with it continuing to live on after death.

== Scriptures ==
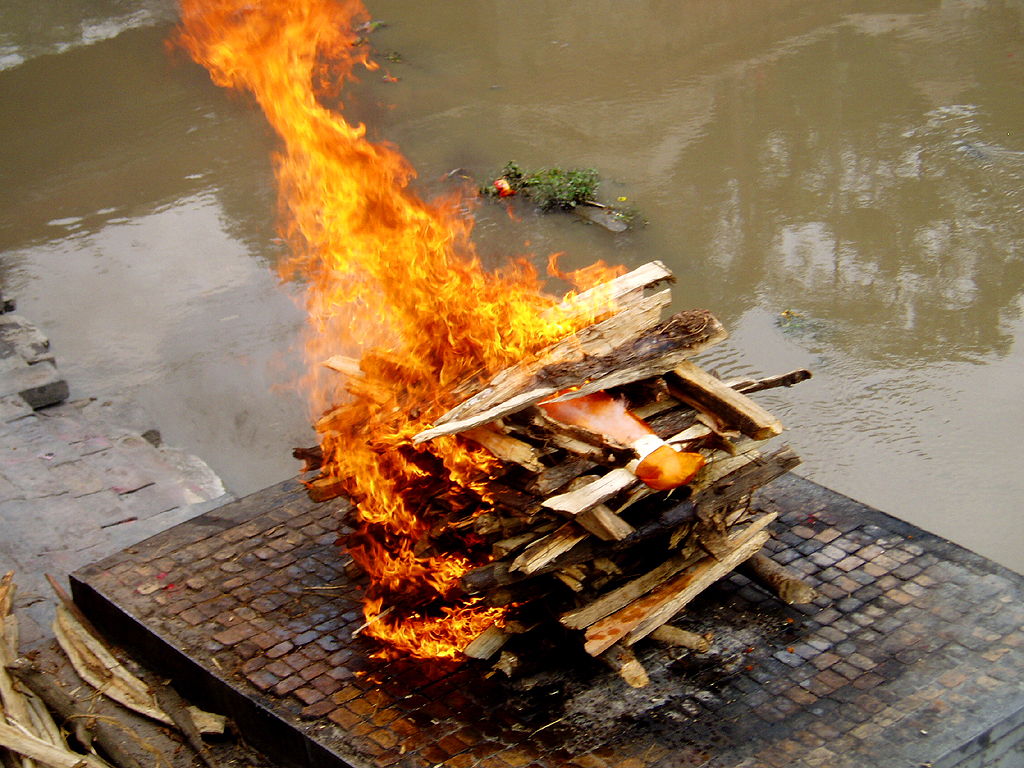
A Hindu cremation rite in Nepal. The samskara above shows the body wrapped in saffron cloth on a pyre.

The Antyesti rite of passage is structured around the idea in ancient Hindu literature that the microcosm of all living beings is a reflection of a macrocosm of the universe. The soul (Atman, Brahman) is the immortal essence that is released at the Antyesti ritual, but both the body and the universe are transitory veichles in various schools of Hinduism. The human body and the universe consist of 5 elements in Hindu texts – air, water, fire, earth and space. The last rite of passage returns the body to the five elements and its origins.

These 5 elements are known as pancamahabuta in some Hindu texts. Antyesti is seen as the 16th and final rite of passage (samskara) and also as a final ritual that is offered (isti) through which these 5 elements go back to nature. Hymns in the Rigveda 10.6 call Agni as Jatavedas ("possessor of creatures") to prepare the body of the deceased and Kravyavahana ("carrier of the flesh") to guide it towards the realm of ancestors (pitrloka). Jatavedas and Kravyavahana are seen as protective forms of Agni which are different from Agni Kravyad (flesh eating Agni), which is associated with cremating the physical body. Verse 10.16.10 has also been seen as an early reference to pitryajna ("offering to the ancestors"). Here and in this context, prityajna refers to an offering made on the funeral pyre to help the deceased become an ancestor. Additionally, the ceremony may also support the grieving family of the deceased by providing them with a shared structure of mourning.

The roots of this belief are found in the Vedas, for example in the hymns of Rigveda in section 10.16, as follows:

Don't burn him through, Agni; don't scorch him; don't singe his skin, nor his body.|
When you will make him cooked to readiness, Jātavedas, then impel him forth to the forefathers.||
When you will have made him cooked to readiness, Jātavedas, then deliver him to the forefathers.||
When he will embark on the (way) leading to (the other) life, then he will lead at the will of the gods.|
Let your eye go to the sun, your life-breath to the wind. Go to heaven and to earth as is fitting.|
Or go to the waters, if it has been fixed for you there. Take your stand in the plants with your limbs.||

— Rigveda 10.16

The final rites of a burial, in case of untimely death of a child, is rooted in Rig Veda's section 10.18, where the hymns mourn the death of the child, praying to deity Mrityu to "neither harm our girls nor our boys", and pleads the earth to cover, protect the deceased child as a soft wool.

== Antyesti practices ==
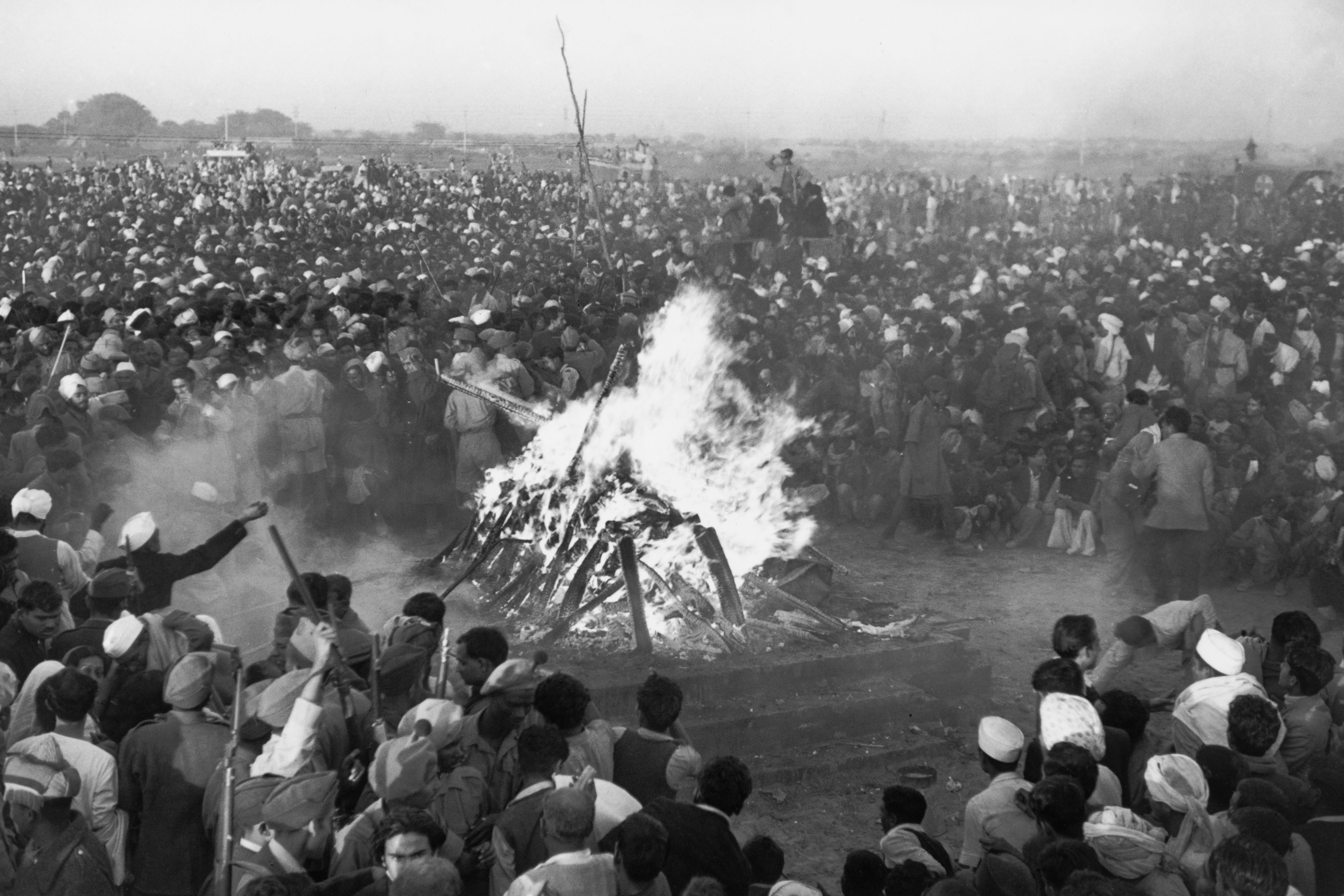
Cremation of Mahatma Gandhi at Rajghat, 31 January 1948. It was attended by Sardar Vallabh Bhai Patel, Jawaharlal Nehru, Lord and Lady Mountbatten, Maulana Azad, Rajkumari Amrit Kaur, Sarojini Naidu and other national leaders. His son Devdas Gandhi lit the pyre.

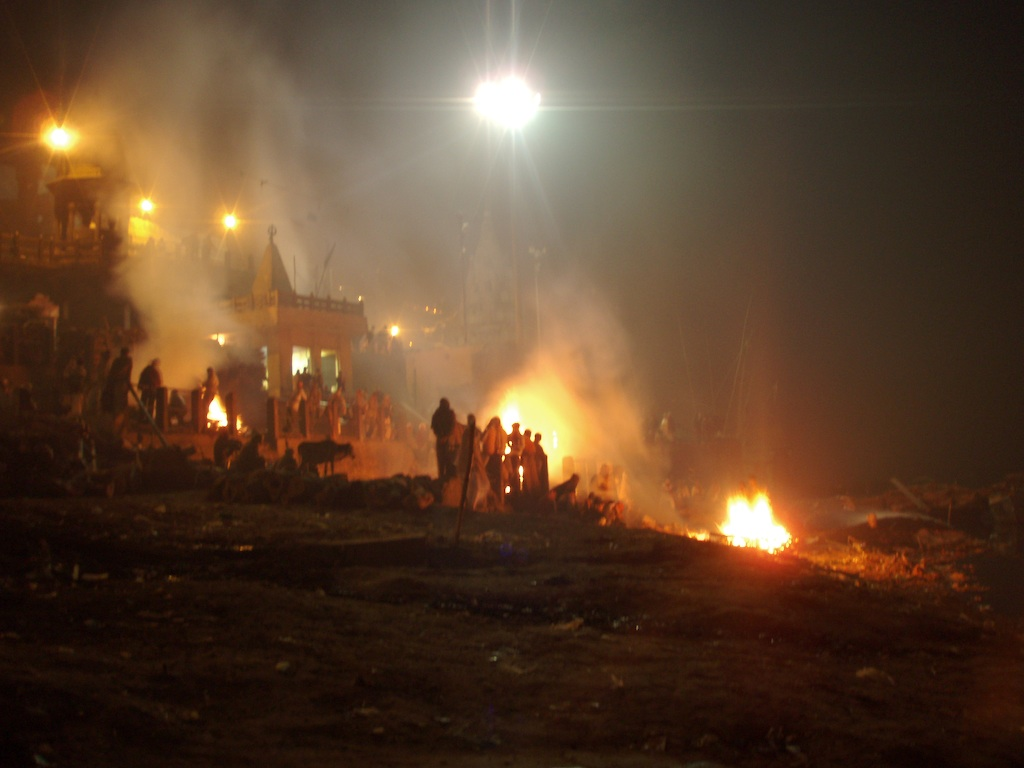
Burning ghats of Manikarnika, at Varanasi, India.

Ceremonial offerings vary across the spectrum of Hindu society. Some of the popular rituals followed in Vedic religions after the death of a human being, for their peace and ascent to heaven are as follows.

=== Shmashana - the cremation ground ===
A Hindu cremation ground is known as Shmashana in Sanskrit and is often located near a river. Those who can afford it may go to special sacred places like Puri, Gaya, Varanasi, Haridwar, Prayagraj, Srirangam, Brahmaputra on the occasion of Ashokashtami and Rameswaram to complete this rite of immersion of ashes into water.

=== Cremation rituals ===
The last rites are usually completed within a day of death. While practices vary among sects, the body is generally washed, wrapped in white cloth, if the dead is a man or a widow, or red cloth, if it is a woman whose husband is still alive, the big toes are tied together with a string and a Tilak (red, yellow or white mark) is placed on the forehead. The deceased adult's body is carried to the cremation ground near a river or water, by family and friends, and placed on a pyre with feet facing north.

The eldest son, or a male mourner, or a priest – called the lead cremator or lead mourner – then bathes himself before leading the cremation ceremony. He circumambulates the dry wood pyre with the body, says a eulogy or recites a hymn, places sesame seeds or rice in the deceased person's mouth, sprinkles the body and the pyre with ghee (clarified butter), then draws three lines signifying Yama (deity of the dead), Kala ('Time', deity of cremation and finality) and the dead. Before lighting the pyre, an earthen pot is filled with water, and the lead mourner circles the deceased body with it, before throwing the pot over his shoulder so it breaks near the head. Once the pyre is ablaze, the lead mourner and the closest relatives may circumambulate the burning pyre one or more times. The ceremony is concluded by the lead cremator, during the ritual, is kapala kriya, or the ritual of piercing the burning skull with a stave (bamboo fire poker) to make a hole or break it to release the spirit.

All those who attend the cremation, and are exposed to the deceased body or cremation smoke take a shower as soon as possible after the cremation, as the cremation ritual is considered unclean and polluting. After the ashes from the cremated body have cooled, they might be immersed or scattered in a river or sea.

In some regions, sons and other male relatives of the deceased shave their heads and beards. On the tenth, eleventh or twelfth day, after the death, family members might invite relatives, friends and neighbours to eat a simple meal together in remembrance of the deceased. This day, in some communities, also marks a day when the poor and needy are offered food in memory of the dead.

=== Modern cremation methods ===
Both manual bamboo wood pyres and electric cremation are used for Hindu cremations. For the electric cremation, the body is kept on a bamboo frame on rails near the door of the electric chamber. After cremation, the mourner can collect the ashes and consecrate it to a water body, such as a river or sea.

=== Burial in Hinduism ===
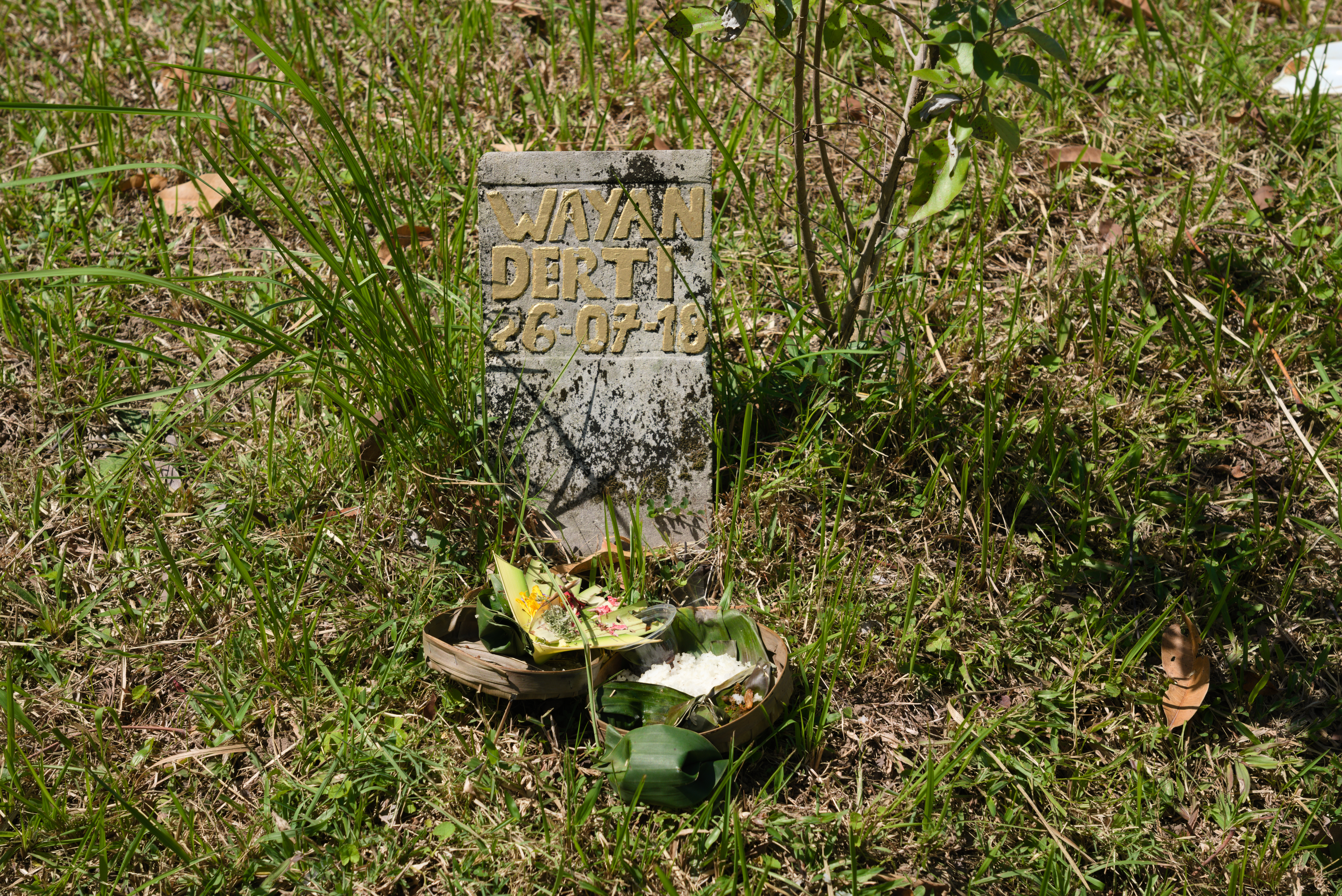
A Hindu grave in Bali

Apart from the cremation method, several sects in Hinduism follow the practice of burial of the deceased. In some sects, important gurus, swamis or sadhus can be buried. Preparation rituals for the burial can be similar to cremation. This can include washing the body, applying vibhuti (holy ash), kumkum or sandalwood paste on the forehead before the body is buried. The body is either placed in sleeping position or in some Shaivite and tribal traditions is in Padmasana sitting position with legs folded and arms resting on the thigh simulating meditative position.

The burial pit is prepared in the community burial ground called Shamshana, usually situated outside the city or village. Some affluent families will bury deceased relatives dead on land that they own. The burial pit for sleeping position is generally three feet wide and six feet long and for sitting position it is three feet by three feet. As a thumb rule in all the sects invariable the saints are buried in sitting position in a separate place where later on a Samadhi is built which becomes a place of worship. For example, followers of Ayyavazhi sect bury the body, facing the geographic north in a padmasana position, without coffins and it is covered by sand or Namam (sacred soil) as an act austerity for the unfolding of Dharma Yukam.

== Post Antyesti rituals ==
Other Indian rituals after death include Niravapanjali, Tarpana, Śrāddha, Rasam Pagri, Pitru Paksha.

=== Genealogy registers ===
Many people visit Hindu pilgrimage sites to perform, Śrāddha ceremonies, like Gaya, Pehowa, Kurukshetra, Haridwar, Gokarneshwar, Nashik etc. where they also update their genealogy registers maintained by pandas.

- Hindu genealogy registers at Chintpurni, Himachal Pradesh
- Hindu genealogy registers at Haridwar
- Hindu genealogy registers at Jawalamukhi, Himachal Pradesh
- Hindu genealogy registers at Kurukshetra, Haryana
- Hindu genealogy registers at Peohwa, Haryana
- Hindu genealogy registers at Trimbakeshwar, Maharashtra
- Hindu genealogy registers at Varanasi

== Observance by Hindu communities outside India and Nepal ==
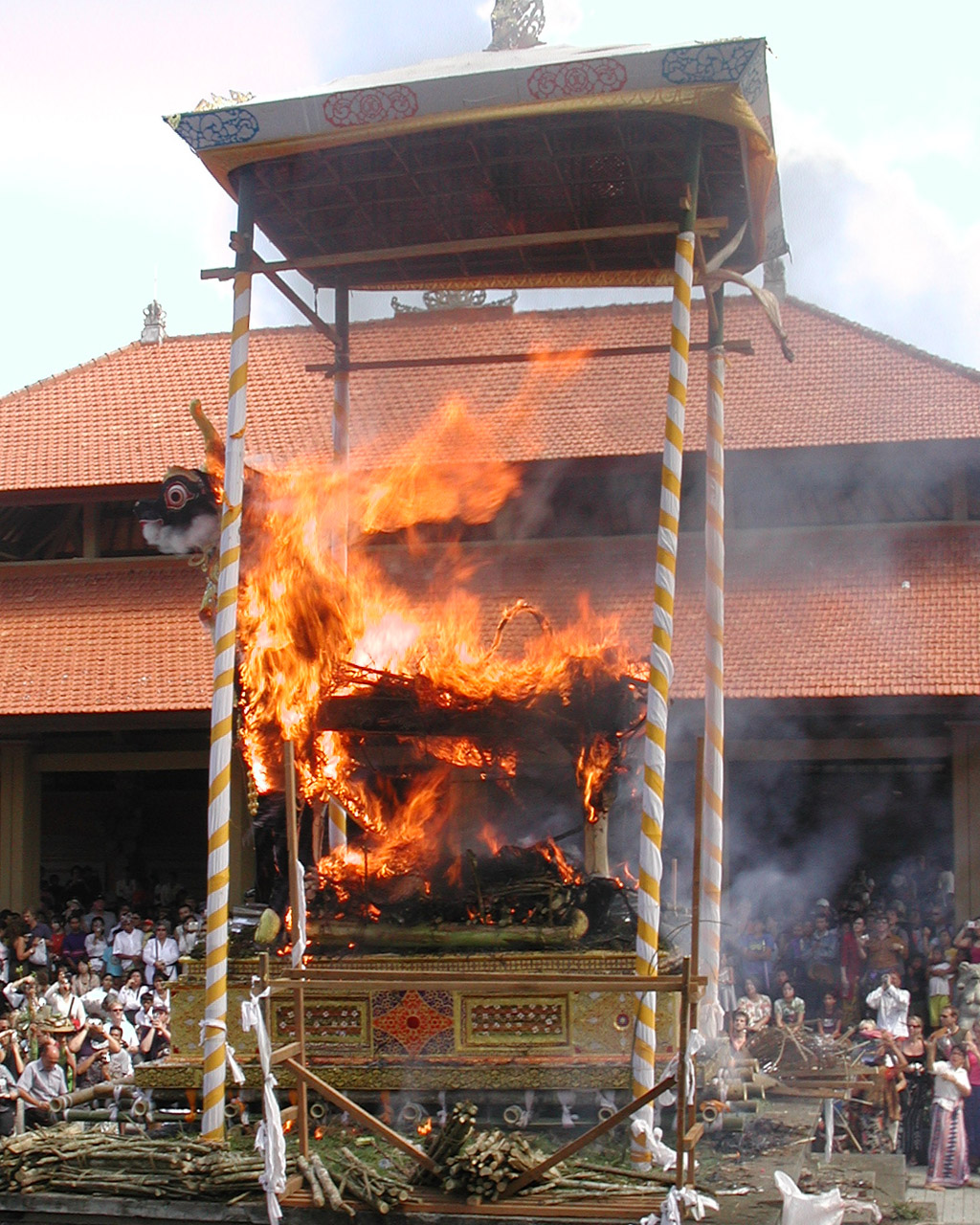
Cremation of the dead by Hindus in Ubud, Bali, Indonesia.

=== Trinidad and Tobago ===
Hindus brought into Trinidad and Tobago as indentured laborers for plantations between 1845 and 1917, by the British colonial government, suffered discriminatory laws that did not allow cremation, and other rites of passage such as the traditional marriage, because the colonial officials considered these as pagan and uncivilized barbaric practices. The non-Hindu government further did not allow the construction of a crematorium. After decades of social organization and petitions, the Hindus of Trinidad gained the permission to practice their traditional rites of passage including Antyesti in the 1950s, and build the first crematorium in 1980s.

=== United Kingdom ===
In the United Kingdom, it was formerly illegal to conduct a traditional outdoors Hindu cremation under the 1902 Cremation Act, with Hindus having to cremate their dead in indoor crematoriums instead. In 2006, Daven Ghai, a British Hindu who had been refused the right to have a traditional funeral by Newcastle City Council, brought a case to court in which he claimed that the current law did in fact allow open air cremations, so long as they were in some enclosed building and away from the public. A High Court ruling disagreed with his claim, and the-then Justice Secretary Jack Straw stated that the British public would "find it abhorrent that human remains were being burned in this way." Nonetheless, upon taking it to the Court of Appeals in 2010, the judge, Lord Justice Neuberger, ruled that such a cremation would be legal under the 1902 Act, so long as it was performed within a building, even an open-air one. Upon his victory, Ghai told reporters that "I always maintained that I wanted to clarify the law, not disobey or disrespect it" and expressed regret at the amount that the trial had cost the taxpayer. He stated that he was thankful that he now had "the right to be cremated with the sun shining on my body and my son lighting the pyre" and he and other Hindus and Sikhs in the country had begun investigations into finding a site upon which they could perform the funerary ceremonies.

== See also ==
- Antam Sanskar
- Cremation in the Christian World
- Cemetery H culture
- Raj Ghat and associated memorials
- Sanskara (rite of passage)
- Sati (practice)
