= Pind Sammelan =

Pind Sammelan or Spindi is a ritual performed in Hinduism on the 13th day of death of somebody. This ritual is performed to place the departed soul with the ancestors and God. It is believed that before the ritual the departed soul is a preta (evil spirit), and after performing this ritual, the soul will become "pitr" (good spirit) and will be included in the ancestors.

In North India, this ritual is called the terahvin.

== See also ==
- Pinda (riceball)
