= Pagri (turban) =

Type of turban

Pagri, sometimes also transliterated as pagari, is the term for turban used in the Indian subcontinent. It specifically refers to a headdress that is worn by men and women, which needs to be manually tied. Other names include saafa (Note: Hindi: साफ़ा, Urdu: صافہ) and sapho.

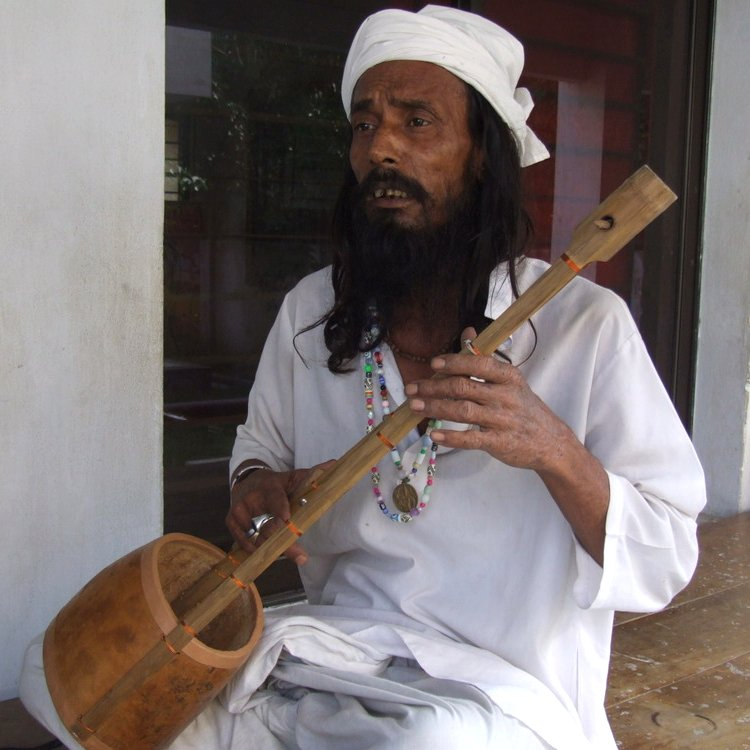
Bengali Sufi mystic (Baul), wearing a white pagri

== Cloth ==
A pagri is usually a long plain unstitched cloth. The length may vary according to the type. The cloth indicates the region and the community of the wearer.

== Specific styles ==
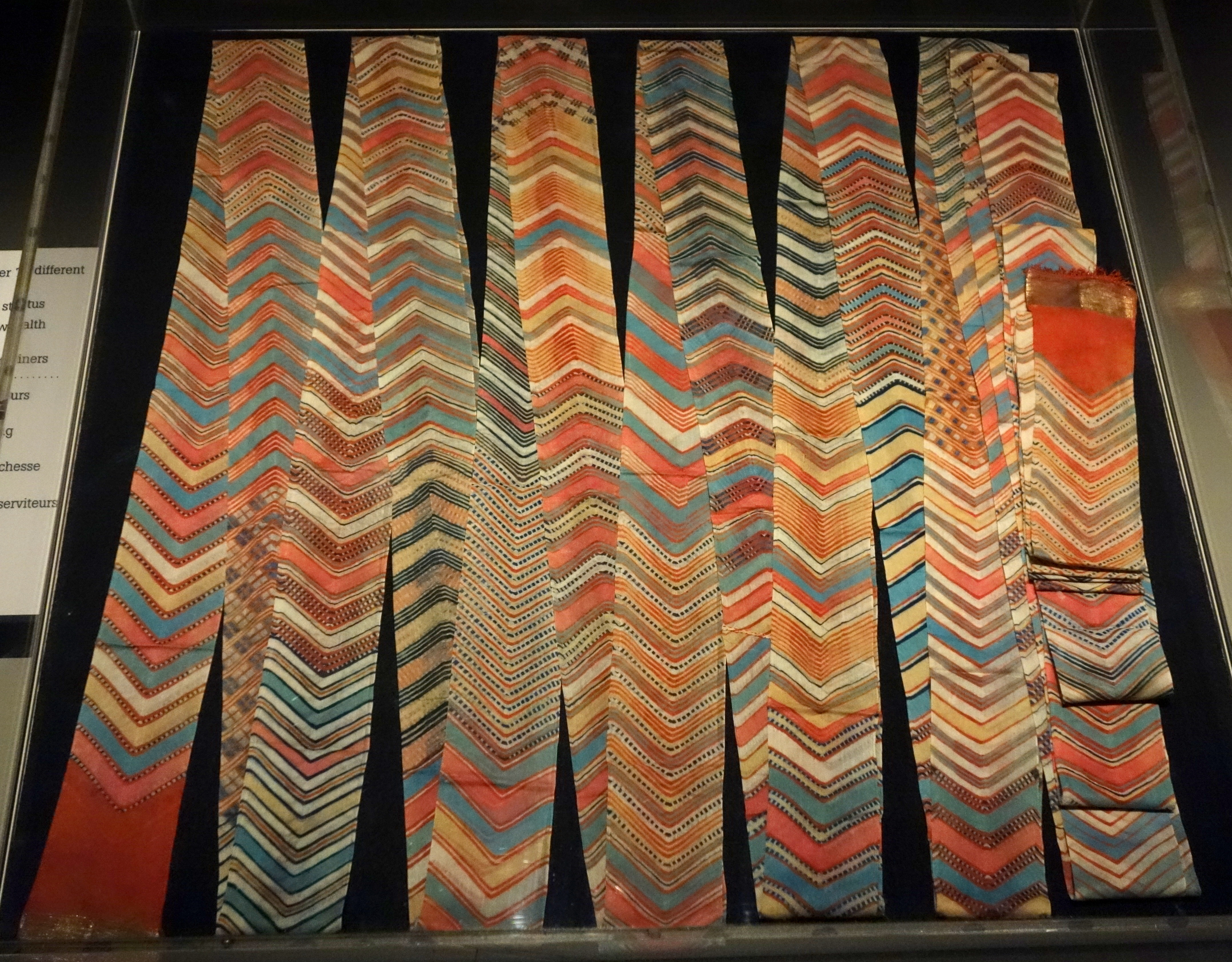
Man's Leheria turban, India, Rajasthan, 19th century.

=== Baul ===
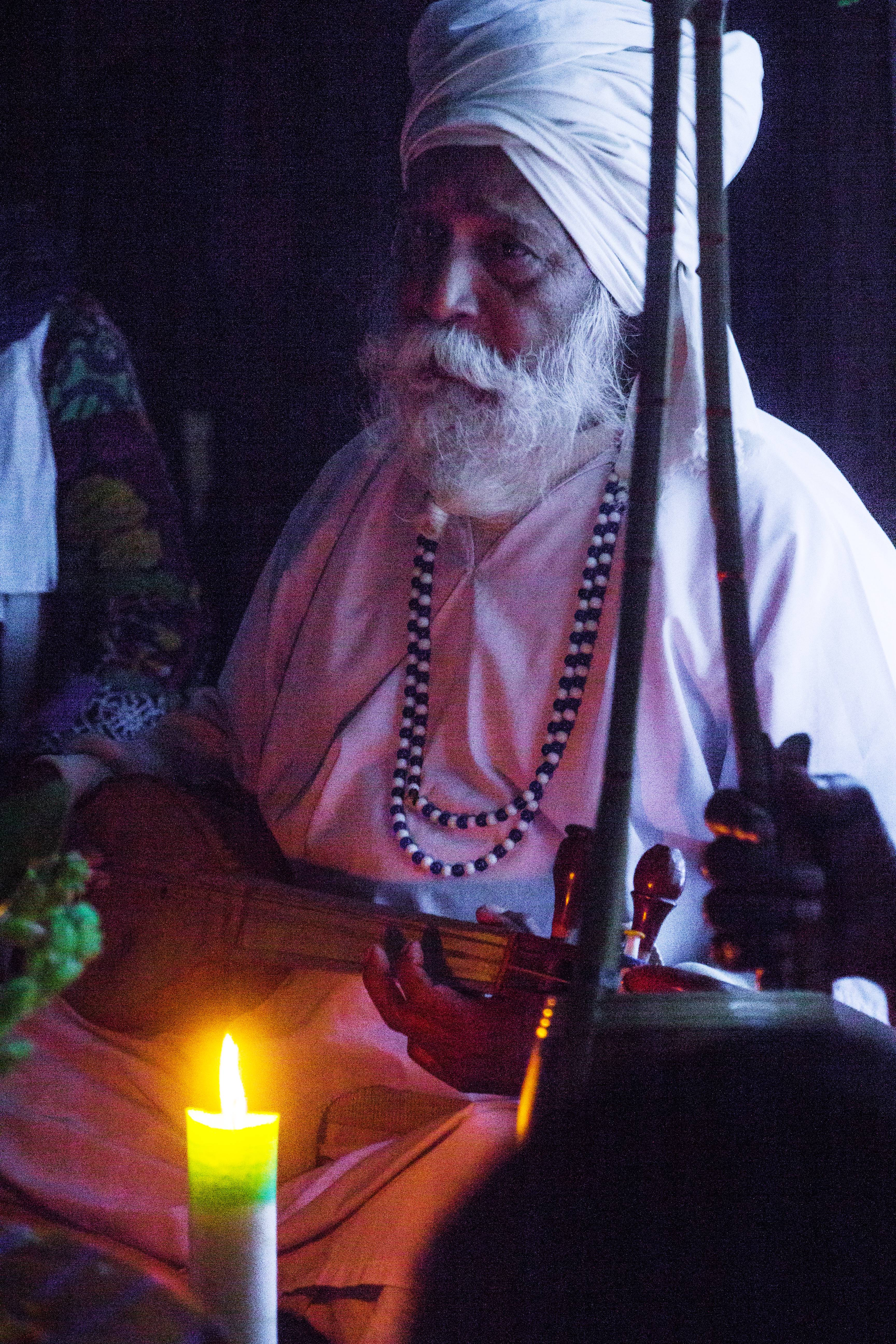
A Baul from Bangladesh wearing white Thobe and Turban, playing a Dotara

Sufi mystics of Bangladesh, known as "Baul Fakirs" , can often be identified by their distinctive clothes. Men typically wear long tunics, known as Alkhallah and turbans known as "Pagri". Women usually wear white Handloom saris, jewelleries, can sometimes also be spotted with turbans.

=== khirki-dār-pagari ===
Methods of binding the pagri are innumerable, and khirki-dar-pagri is one particular style of dressing the turban. Khirki-dar-pagri means the turban with a window. Brocade piece may decorate the turban.

=== Paag ===
The paag is a headdress in the Mithila region of Bihar and in Mithila, Nepal.

=== Pheta ===
Pheta is the Marathi name for the traditional turban worn in Maharashtra, India. In ceremonies such as weddings, festive and cultural and religious celebrations as well it is common to wear Pheta. In many parts it is customary to offer male dignitaries a traditional welcome by offering a Pheta to wear. A traditional Pheta is usually long cloth typically 3.5 to 6 metres long and 1 metre wide. The choice of colour may indicate the occasion for which it is being worn and also may be typical to the place it is being worn in. Typical colours include Saffron (to indicate valour) and White (to indicate peace). In the past, wearing a Pheta was considered a mandatory part of clothing.

There are several styles of Pheta which are specific to regions, for example

- Kolhapuri and Puneri pheta
- Mawali pagadi (traditionally worn by Maratha warriors from the Mawal region of Maharashtra)
- Mahatma Phule pagadi famously worn by the Maharashtrian reformer, the activist from whom it gets the name.

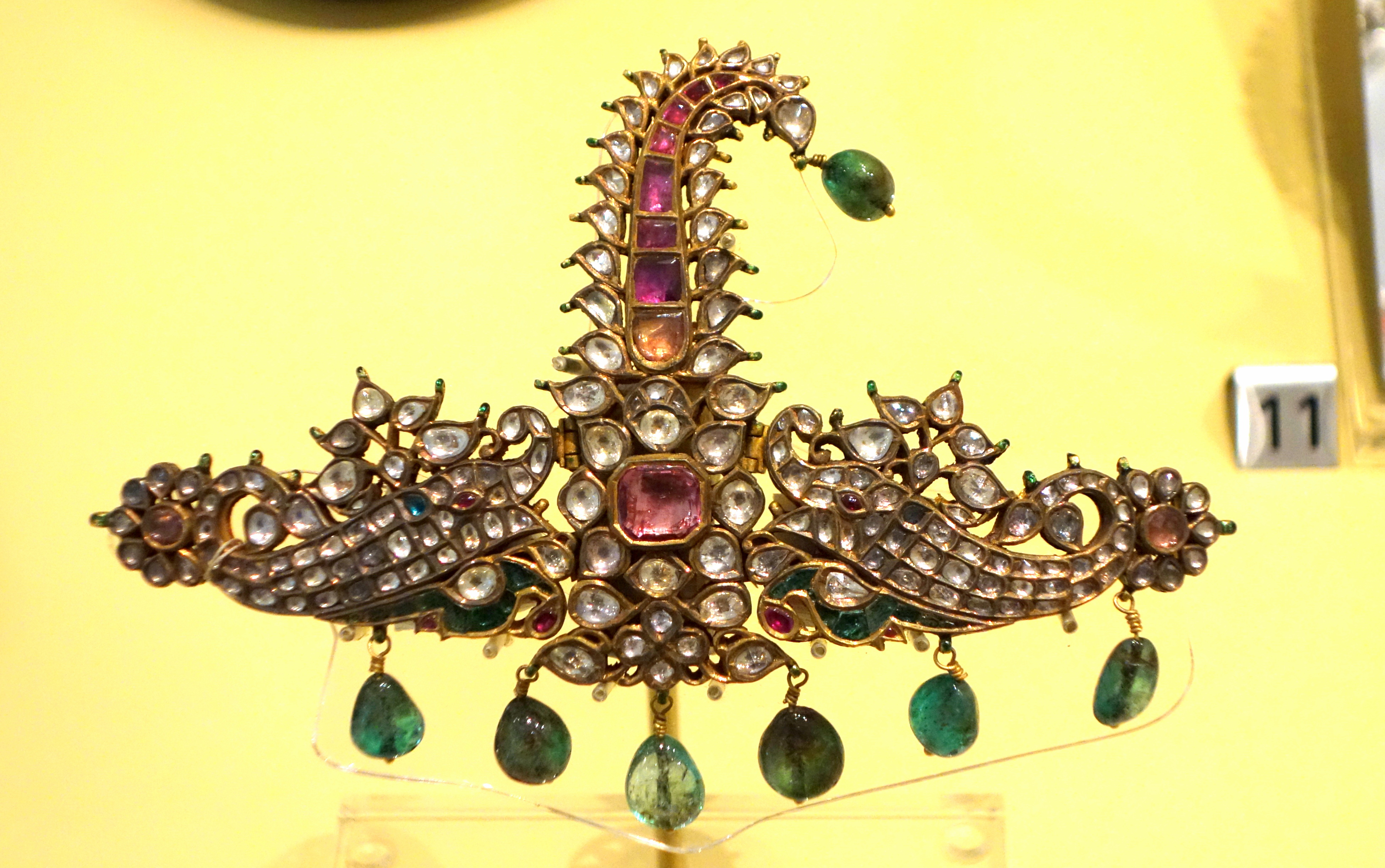
Sarpech (turban ornament) worn on special occasions, India, 18th century

=== Peta ===
The peta is a turban worn in Mysore and Kodagu, it is the traditional indigenous attire worn by the erstwhile Kings of Mysore, called the Wodeyars (1399 to 1947), of the Kingdom of Mysore. Wodeyars wore a richly bejeweled turban made of silk and jari (gold threaded lace) to match with colourful dresses as part of the royal dress.

Administrators under the King, such as the Dewans' (Prime Minister appointed by the King) and other senior officials who swayed considerable power in matters of state administration also donned the Mysore peta.

After India became independent in 1947 and the princely state merged with the Indian union, the traditional Mysore peta has been retained as a symbol of heritage and cultural antecedents and distinguished people are honoured by the award of a Mysore peta with a shawl in formal functions.

=== Rajasthani pagari ===
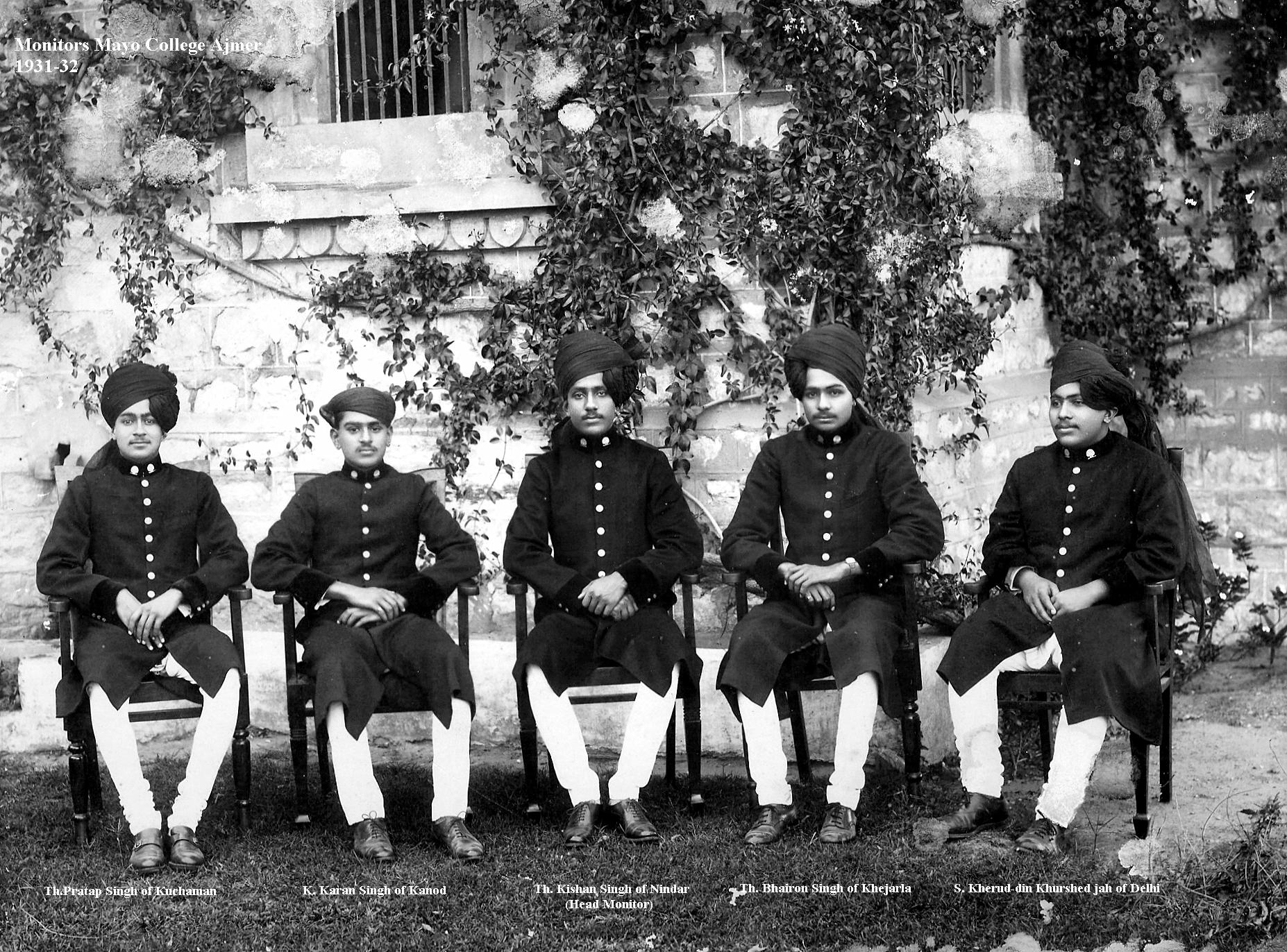
Rajasthani princes wearing a pagri

Turbans worn in Rajasthan are referred to as the pagari and is also pronounced pagri. They vary in style, colour and size. They also indicate a wearer's social class, caste, region and the occasion it being worn for. Its shape and size may also vary with the climatic conditions of the different regions. Turbans in the hot desert areas are large and loose. Farmers and shepherds, who need constant protection from the elements of nature, wear some of the biggest turbans. The Rajasthani turban also has many practical functions. Exhausted travellers use it as a pillow, a blanket or a towel. It can be used to strain muddy water. An unravelled turban can also be used as a rope to draw water from a well with a bucket.

Prominent styles are pencha, sela and safa, although several local variants exist. A conventional pagari is usually 82 inches long and 8 inches wide. A Safa is shorter and broader. Ordinarily a turban of a single colour is worn. However, turbans of one of more colours may be worn by the elite or during special occasions such as festivals or weddings, etc. Rajasthani turbans are a prominent tourist attraction. Tourists are often encouraged to participate in turban-tying competitions.

=== Peshawari pagri ===
Peshawari pagri has been traditionally worn in Peshawar. It includes a cap called kulla and the cloth wrapped around it called lungi.

== Association with figure of speech ==
A pagri is a symbol of honour and respect in all the regions where it is a practice to wear one. Its association with honour also lends its use in a figure of speech in associated languages. The figure of speech pagri uchaalna in Hindi (literal translation: to toss the turban) implies causing the loss of honour.

=== Recognition of communities ===
Different communities in Rajasthan are recognized by the colours and patterns on their pagris. The Kevat community wears only red Bandhani turban at all occasions. Jat community in Narwa village wears a bright yellow turban.

== Pagri in Ancient India: from major museums ==
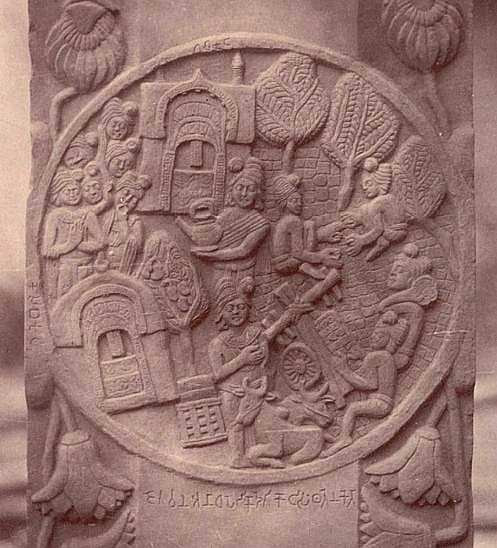
Bharhut, donation of Anathapindika, Shunga period

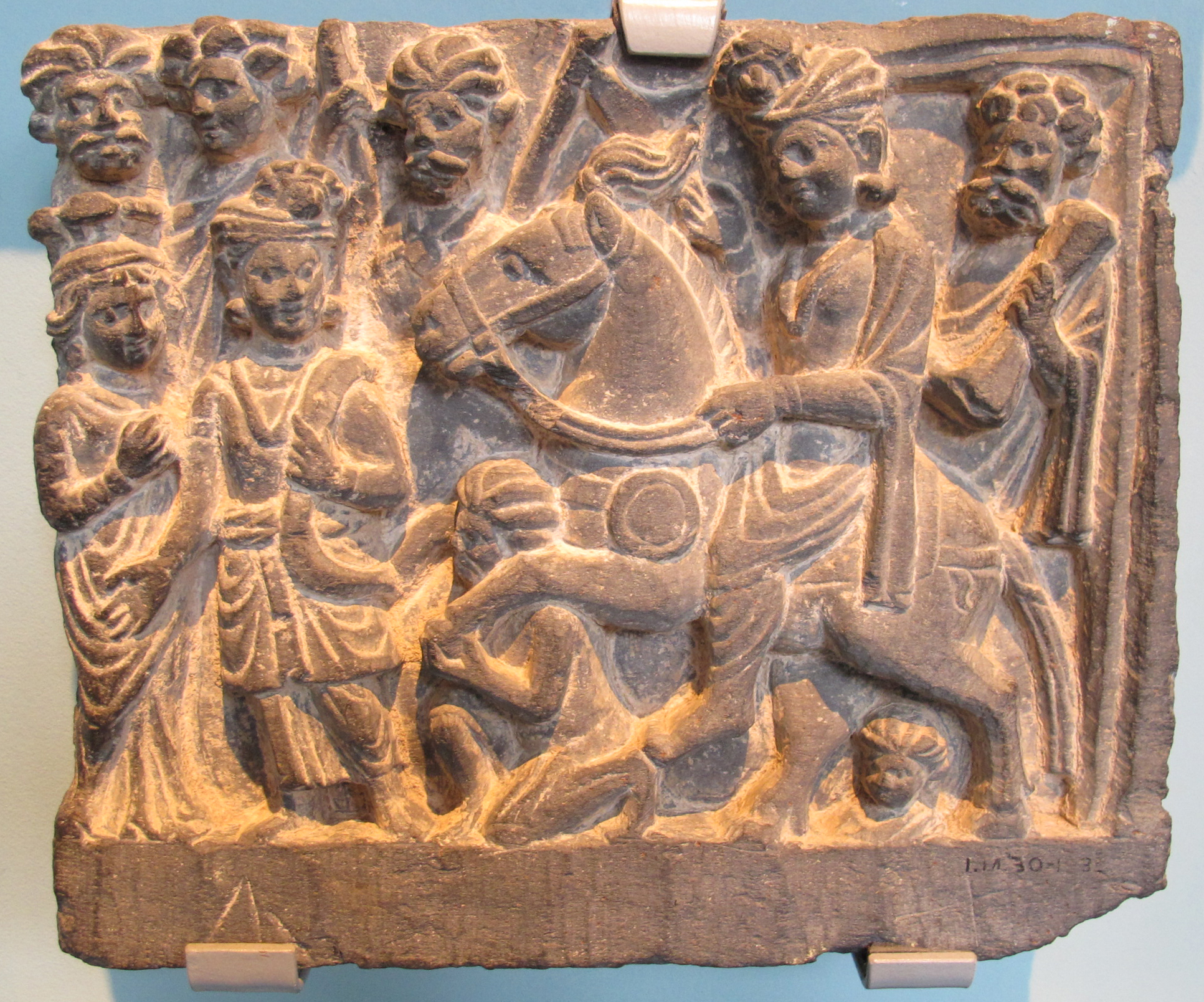
The Great Departure of Buddha, Victoria and Albert Museum

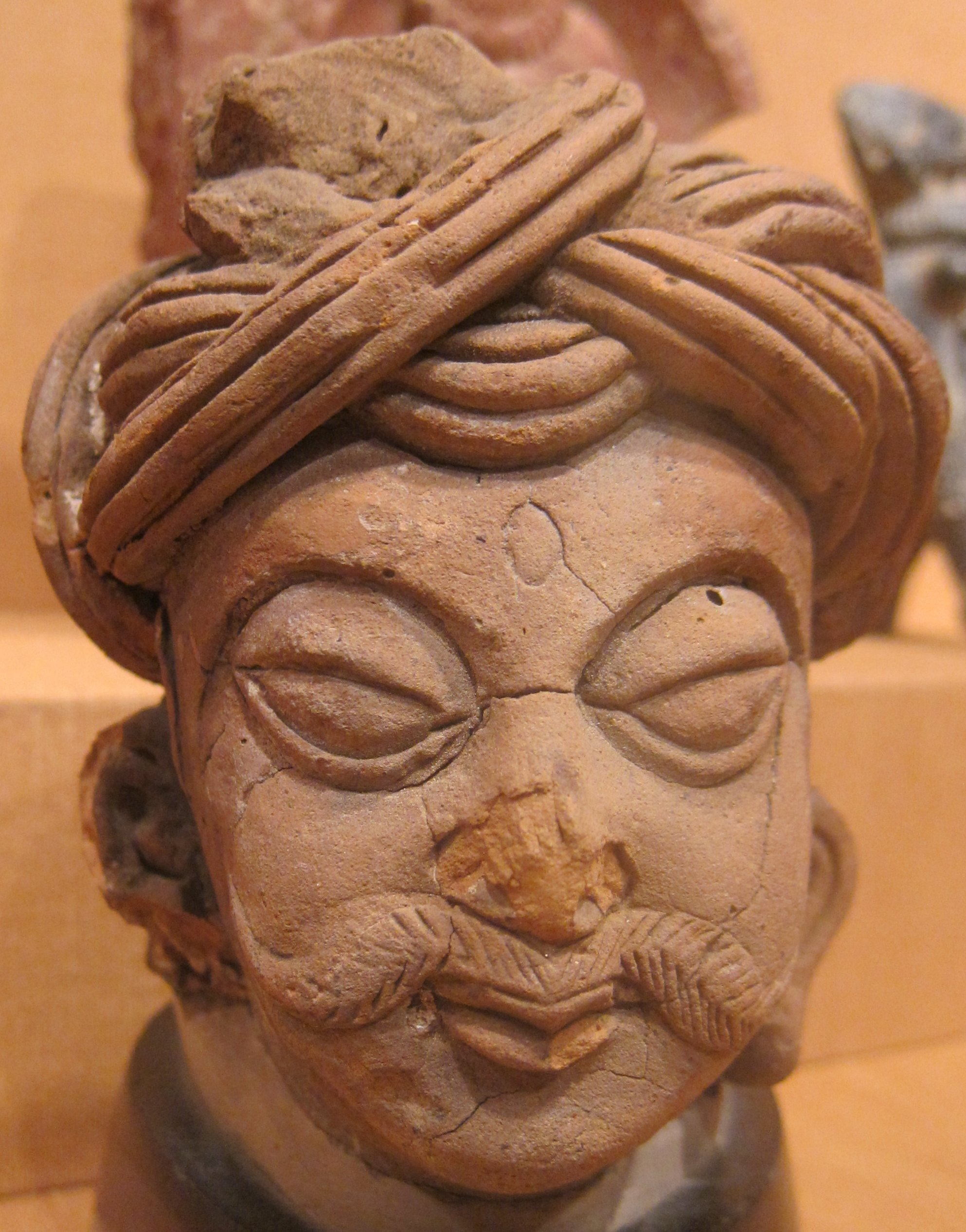
Proto-Pagri, Kushan-Gupta period, 5th-6th century CE, terracotta, Honolulu Academy of Arts

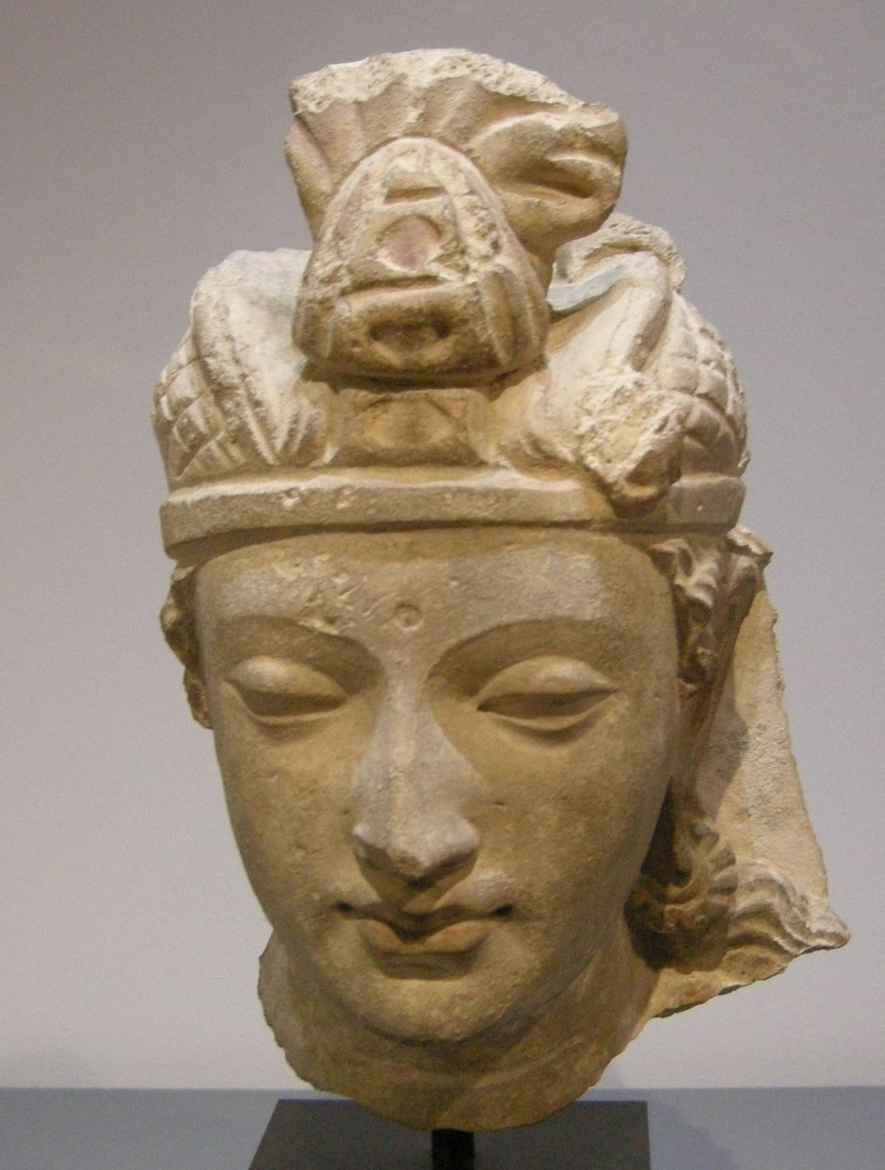
Hadda

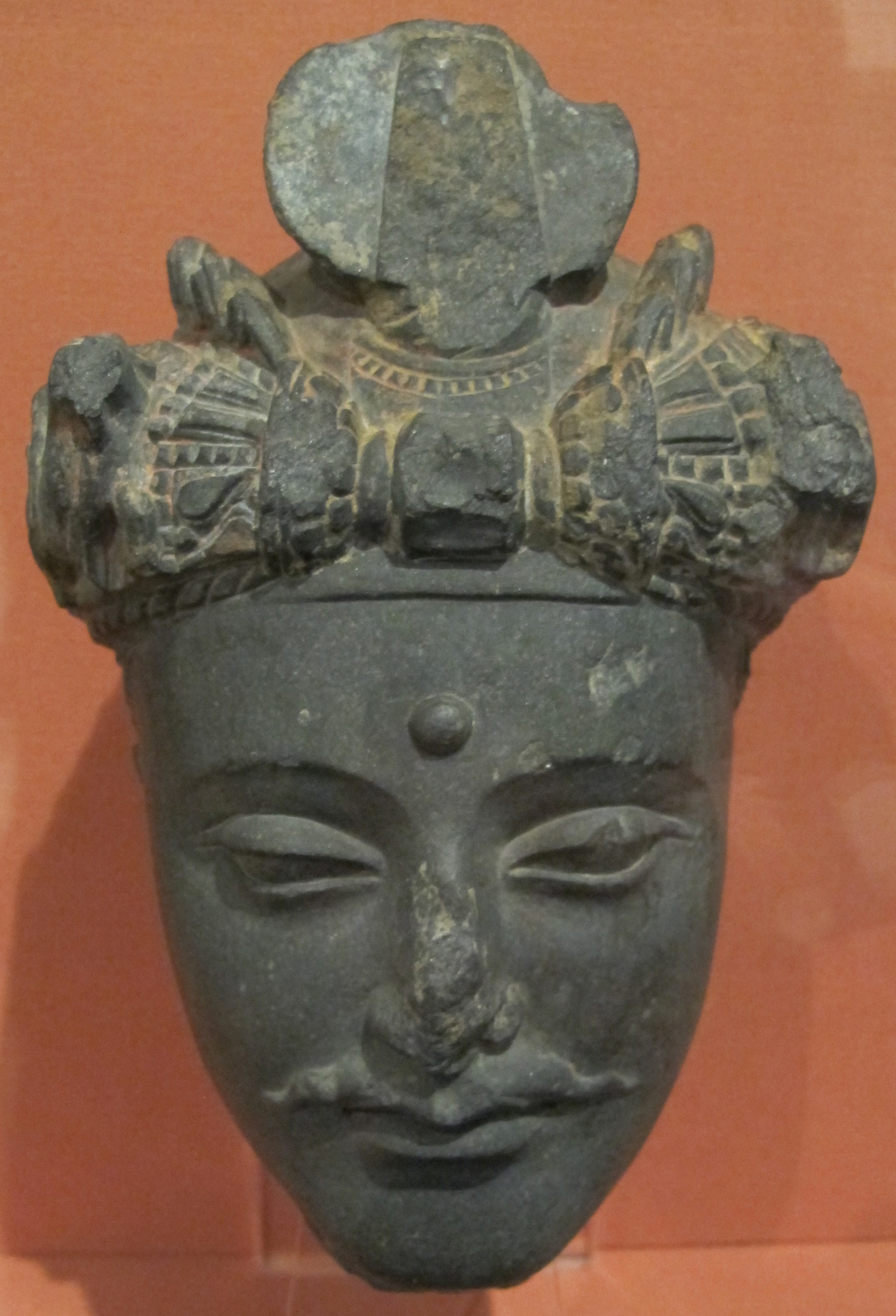
Victoria and Albert Museum

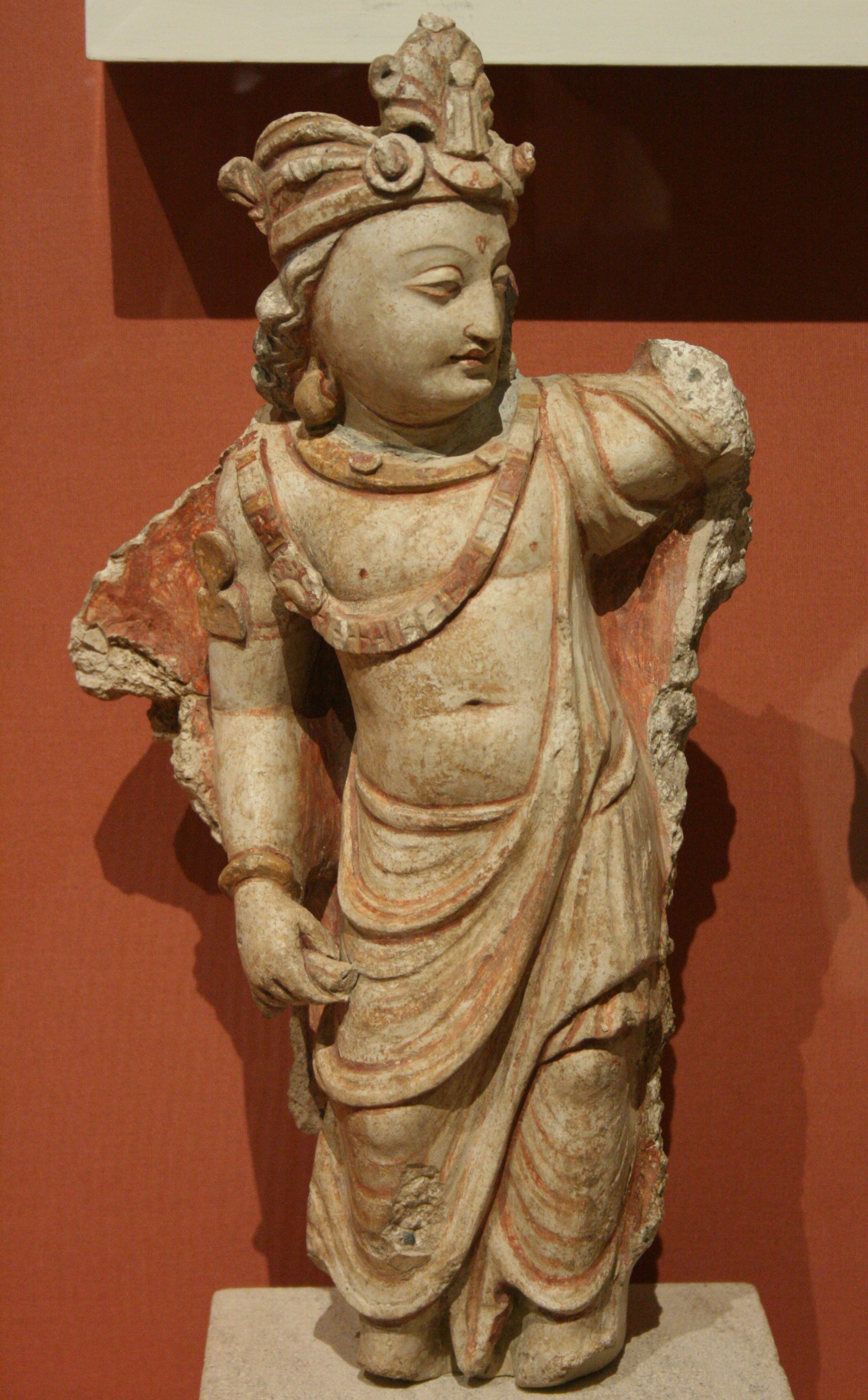
Victoria and Albert Museum

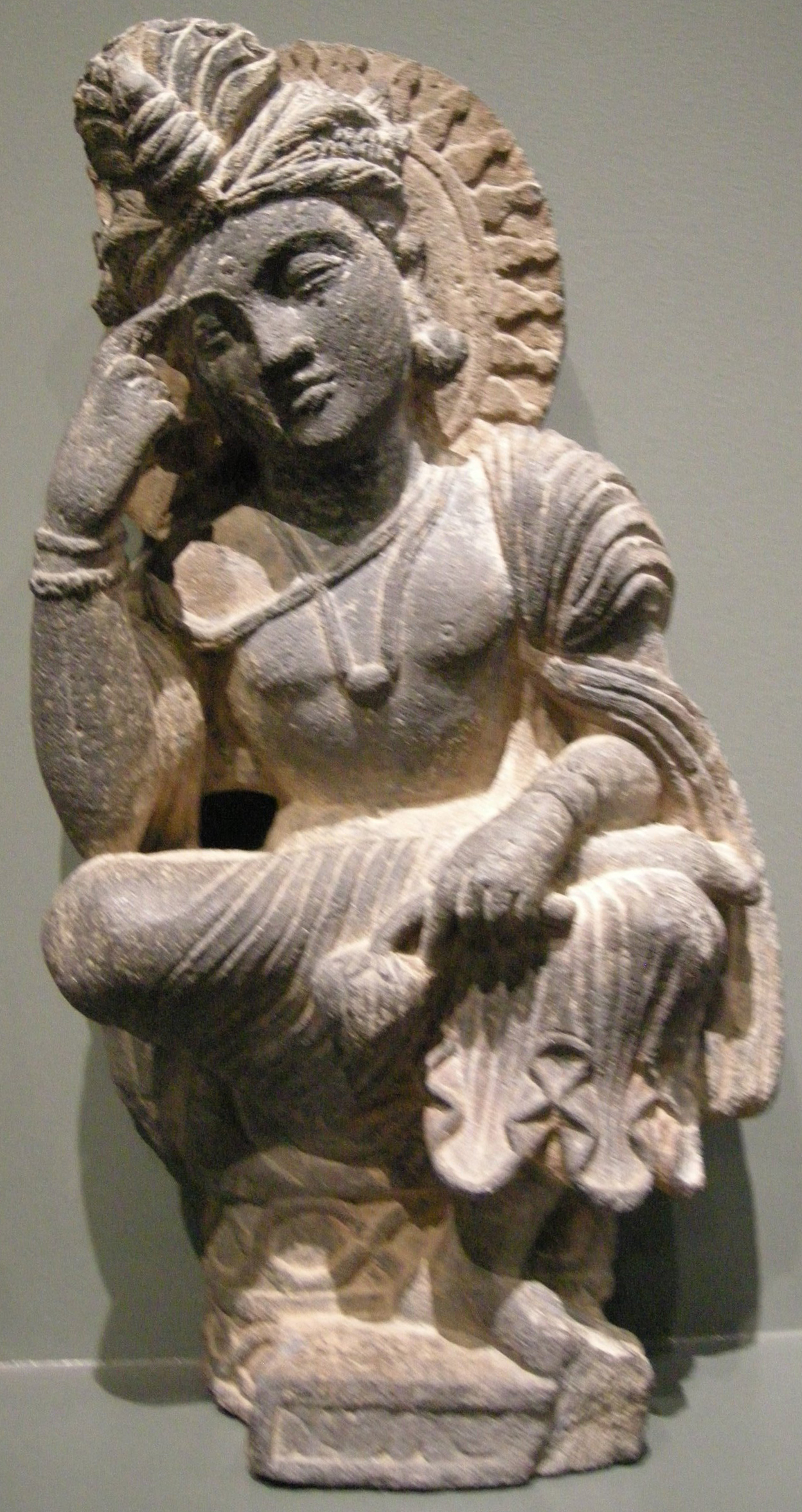
Los Angeles County Museum of Art

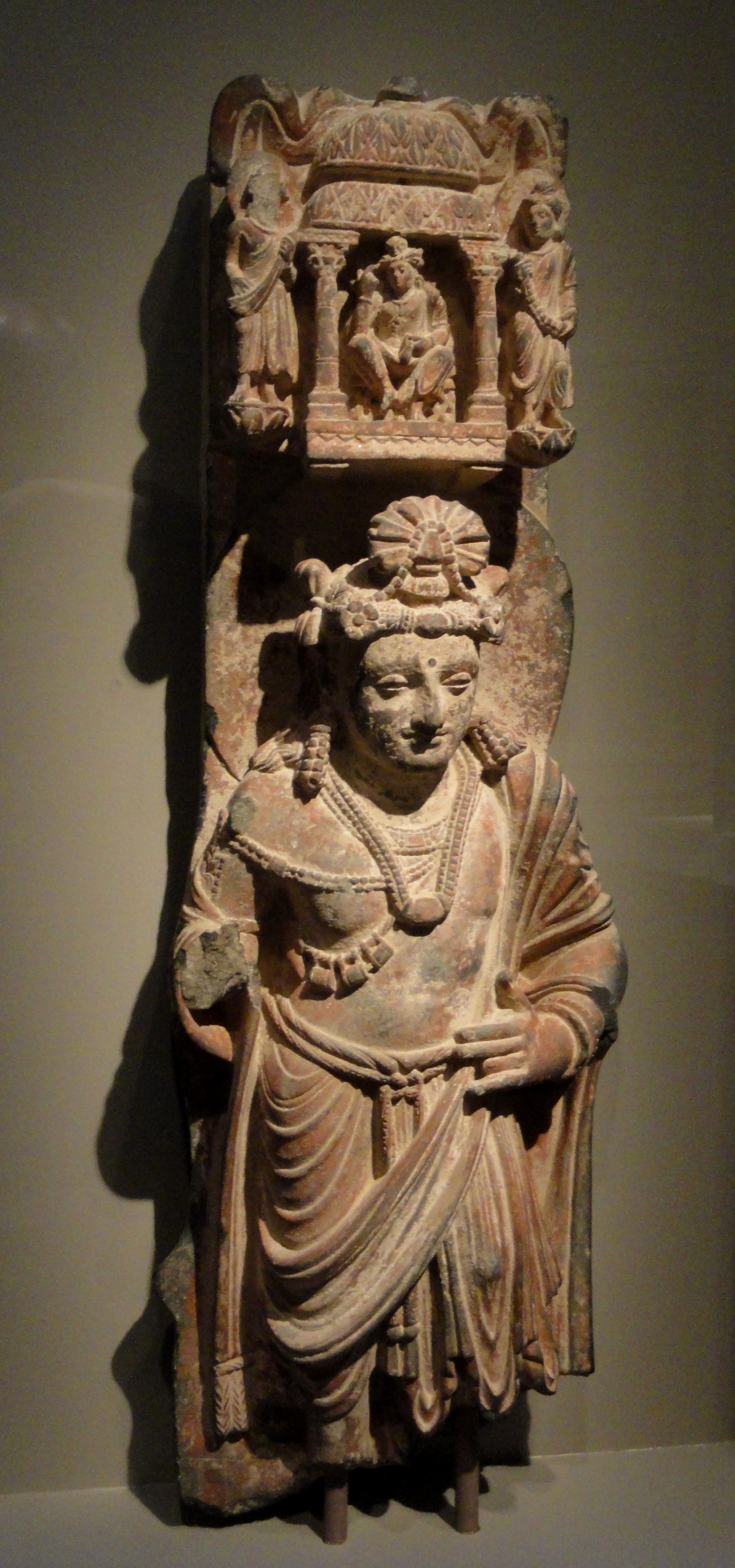
Bodhisattva Maitreya, Arthur M. Sackler Gallery

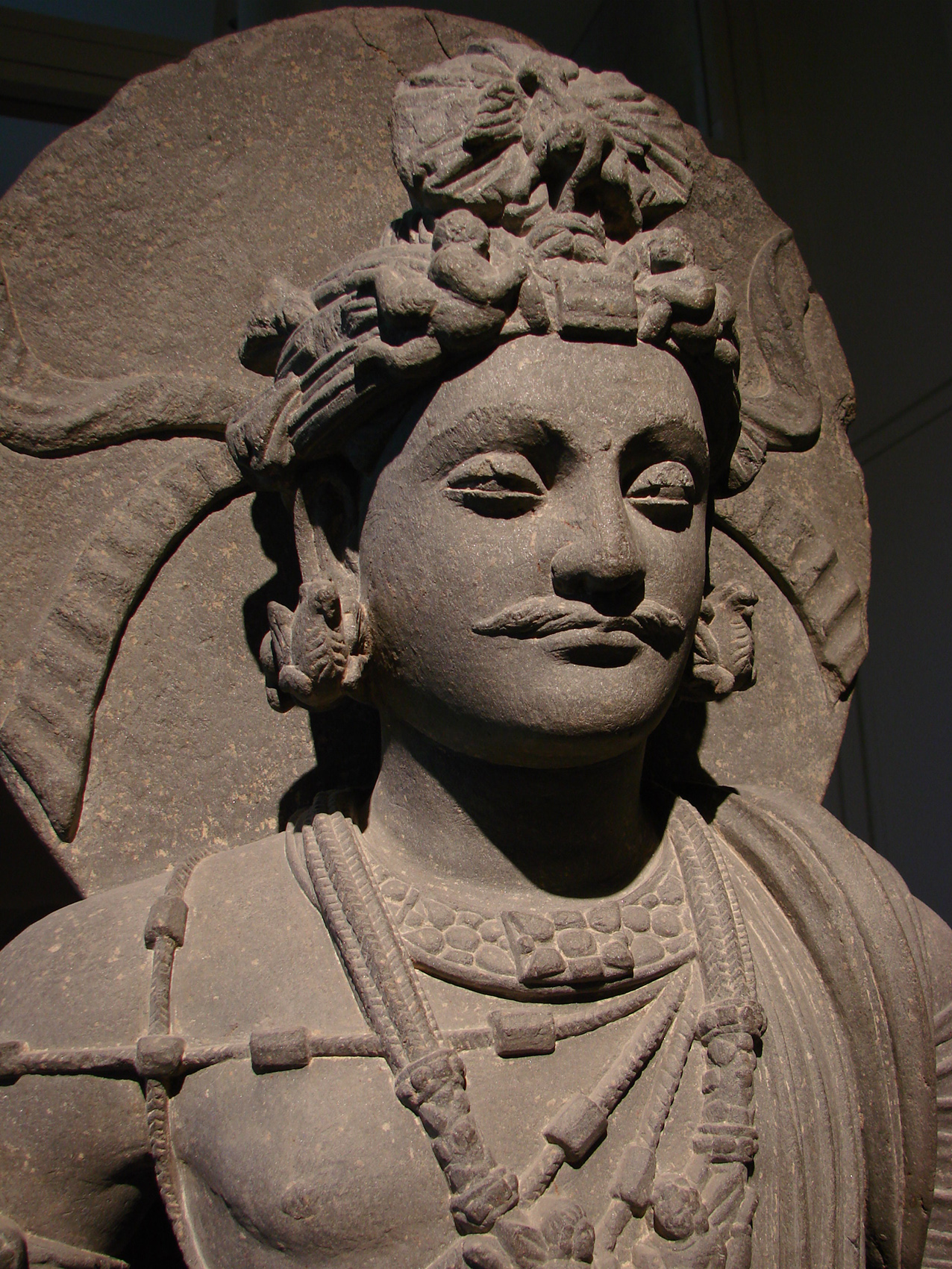
Guimet Museum

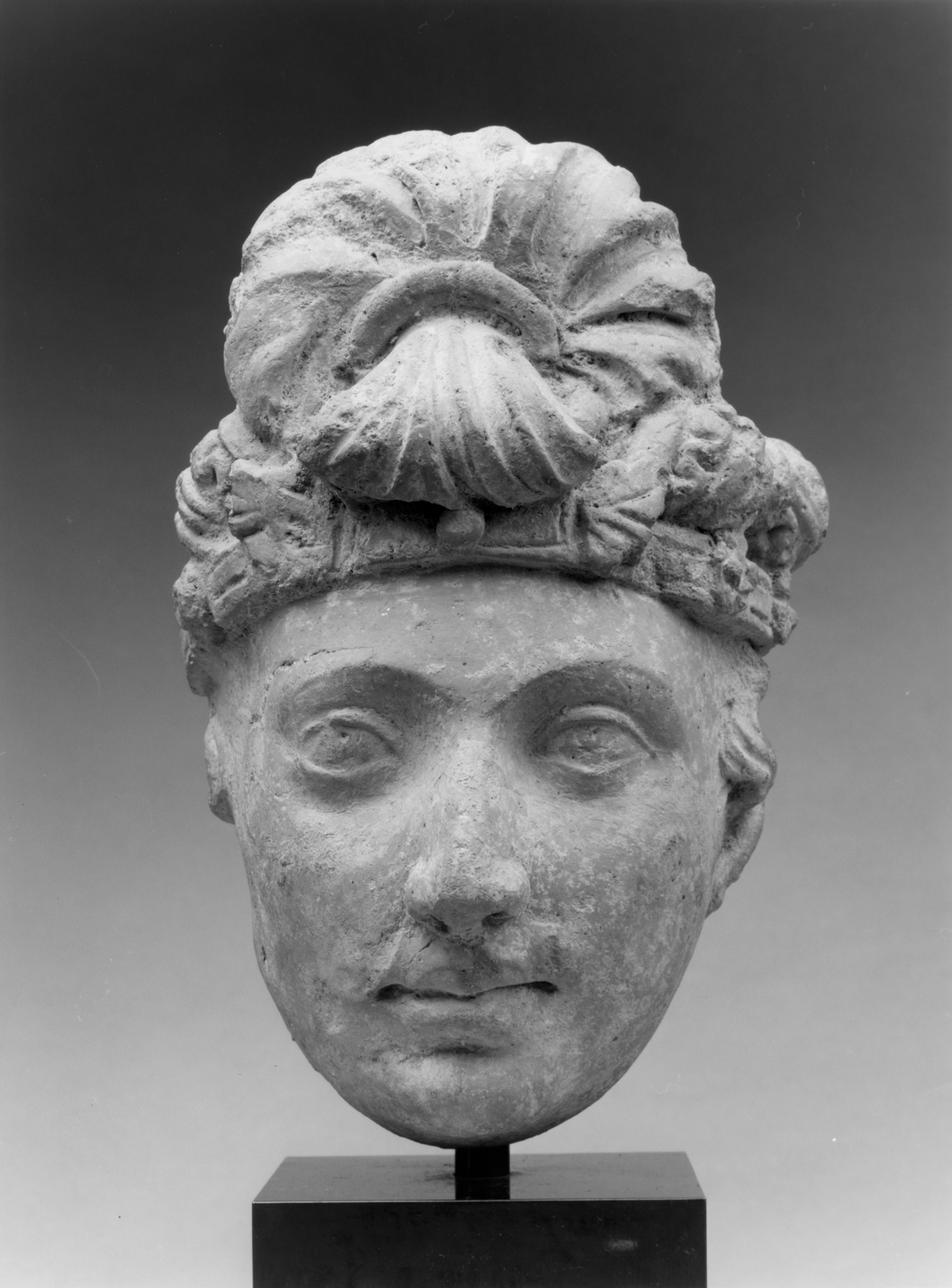
Walters Art Museum, Baltimore

== See also ==
- Head tie
- Khăn vấn
- Mysore peta
- Pheta
- Puneri Pagadi
- Sehra (headdress)
