= Sehra (headdress) =

Headdress worn by the groom during weddings in Indian subcontinent

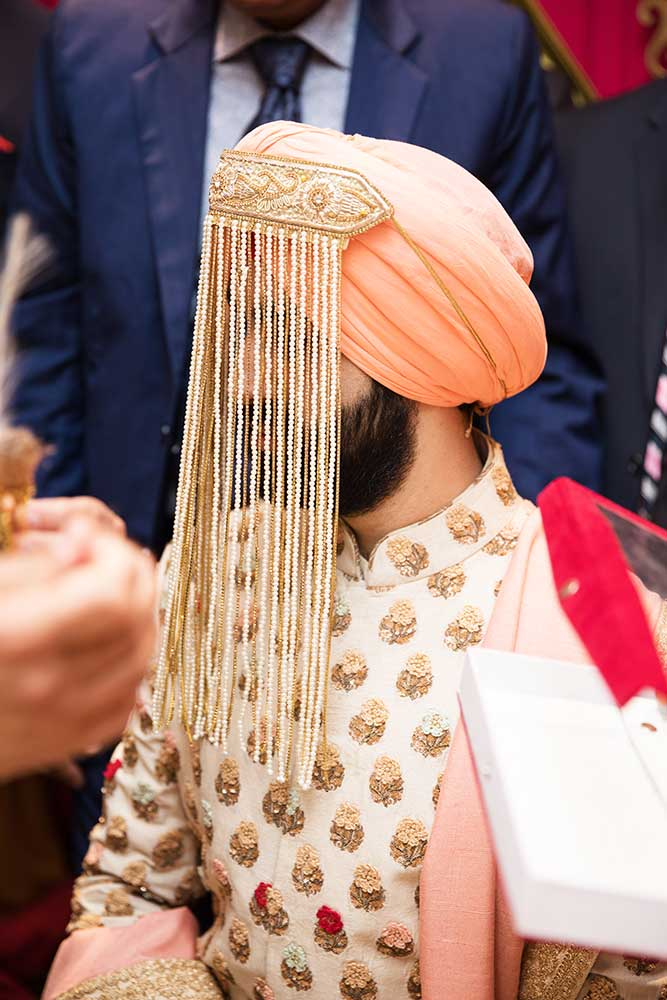
Indian groom in traditional attire, with Sherwani and Sehra

A sehra (Bengali: শেহরি, Hindi: सेहरा, Punjabi: ਸੇਹਰਾ, Urdu: سہرا), sehro (Gujarati: સેહરો), sevrau (Rajasthani: सेवरौ), mundavalya (Marathi: मुण्डावळ्या), morrah (Sindhi: مُوڻ ), or basikam (Telugu: బాసికం) is a forehead garland worn by the bridegroom or bride during weddings in Indian subcontinent.

This decorative groom’s veil can be made either out of flowers or beads and is tied to the groom’s turban or Pagdi.

== Etymology ==
The word sehra is derived from the Sanskrit word Śīrṣahāra (शीर्षहार) meaning garland for decorating head. The word sehra is mentioned in the Braj poetry of the Hindu Bhakti saint Suradāsa.

== Sehrabandi ==
The act of tying the sehra around the groom's head right before he leaves for the bride's house is called sehra bandi.

The sehra is also worn by Caribbean Hindu bridegrooms.
