= Buddhist New Year =

Buddhist New Year may refer to:

- Buddhist calendar#New Year's Day
- Theravada New Year (Songkran), water-splashing festival celebration in the traditional new year for the Theravada Buddhist calendar
  - Songkran (Thailand)
  - Thingyan, in Myanmar
  - Sinhalese New Year (Aluth Avurudda), in Sri Lanka
  - Cambodian New Year (Choul Chnam Thmey), in Cambodia
  - Lao New Year (Pi Mai Lao), in Laos
  - Sangken, in Arunachal Pradesh and parts of Assam, India
  - Sangrai, in Bangladesh
  - Water-Splashing Festival (Pōshuǐ jié), in Xishuangbanna in China and parts of northern Vietnam
- Mahayana New Year, a festival celebrating the traditional new year for the Mahayana Buddhist calendar that usually falls on the full moon of January
- Losar (Tibetan New Year), a new year's festival in Tibetan Buddhism that is celebrated on the first day of the lunisolar Tibetan calendar
