= Water Festival =

New Year celebration in Southeast Asia

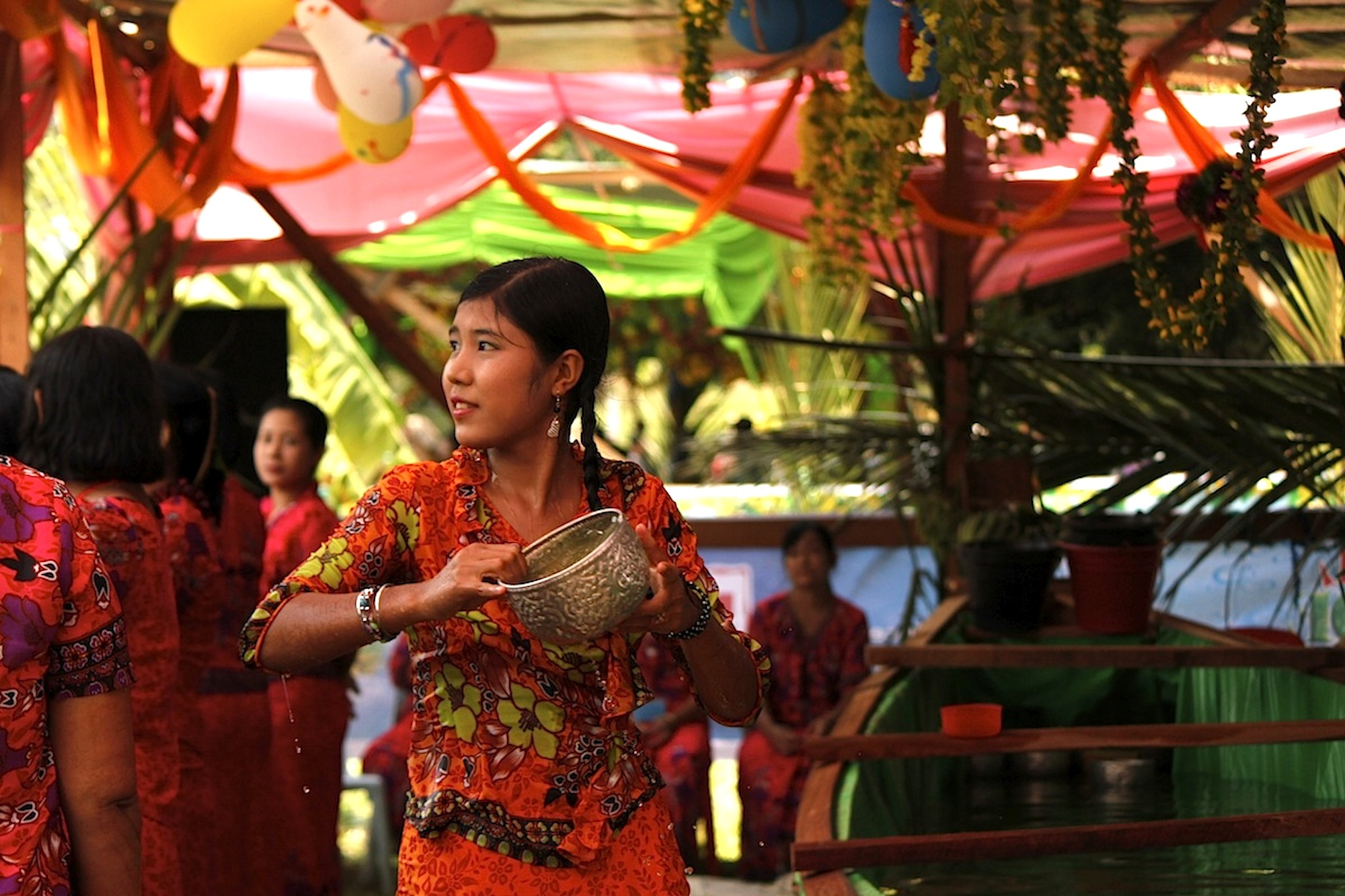
A Rakhine girl pours water at revelers during Myanmar New Year Thingyan Water Festival in Yangon, Myanmar in 2011.

Water festivals are celebrations that occur across the globe, often marking the start of a new year or season. These festivals are deeply rooted in cultural and religious traditions, and they showcase the importance of water as a life-giving resource. In Asia, countries like Myanmar, Thailand, Laos, Cambodia, and the Xishuangbanna Prefecture and Dehong regions of China celebrate their respective new years with lively water festivals such as Songkran, Bunpimay, Thingyan, and Chaul Chnam Thmey. These festivities involve the joyous splashing of water, symbolizing purification and renewal. Beyond Southeast Asia and China, other countries have their own unique water-themed celebrations, from the Holi festival of colors in India to the Water Battle of Spain. These festivals serve as a reminder of the universal significance of water in our lives and our connection to it.

For most Southeast Asian cultures, the festivities are a part of the broader South and Southeast Asian solar New Year and is called the 'Water Festival' by tourists because they notice people splashing or pouring water at one another as part of the cleansing ritual to welcome the Songkran New Year. Traditionally, people gently sprinkled water on one another as a sign of respect, but as the new year falls during the hottest month in South East Asia, many people end up dousing strangers and passers-by in vehicles in boisterous celebration. The act of pouring water is also a show of blessings and good wishes. It is believed that at this Water Festival, everything old must be thrown away, or it will bring the owner bad luck.

== By region ==
The festival is common throughout mainland Southeast Asia and has different names specific to each country, such as Thingyan in Myanmar, Peemai or Songkran (New Year) in Thailand and Laos, and Chaul Chnam Thmey in Cambodia. The Southeast Asian New Year is based on the astrological event of the sun beginning its northward journey. Traditional dance, singing and cultural shows are performed together during the festival. Religious activities in the tradition of Theravada Buddhism are also carried out at both pagoda and monastery. Young people visit elders to pay respect during this period.

=== Myanmar ===
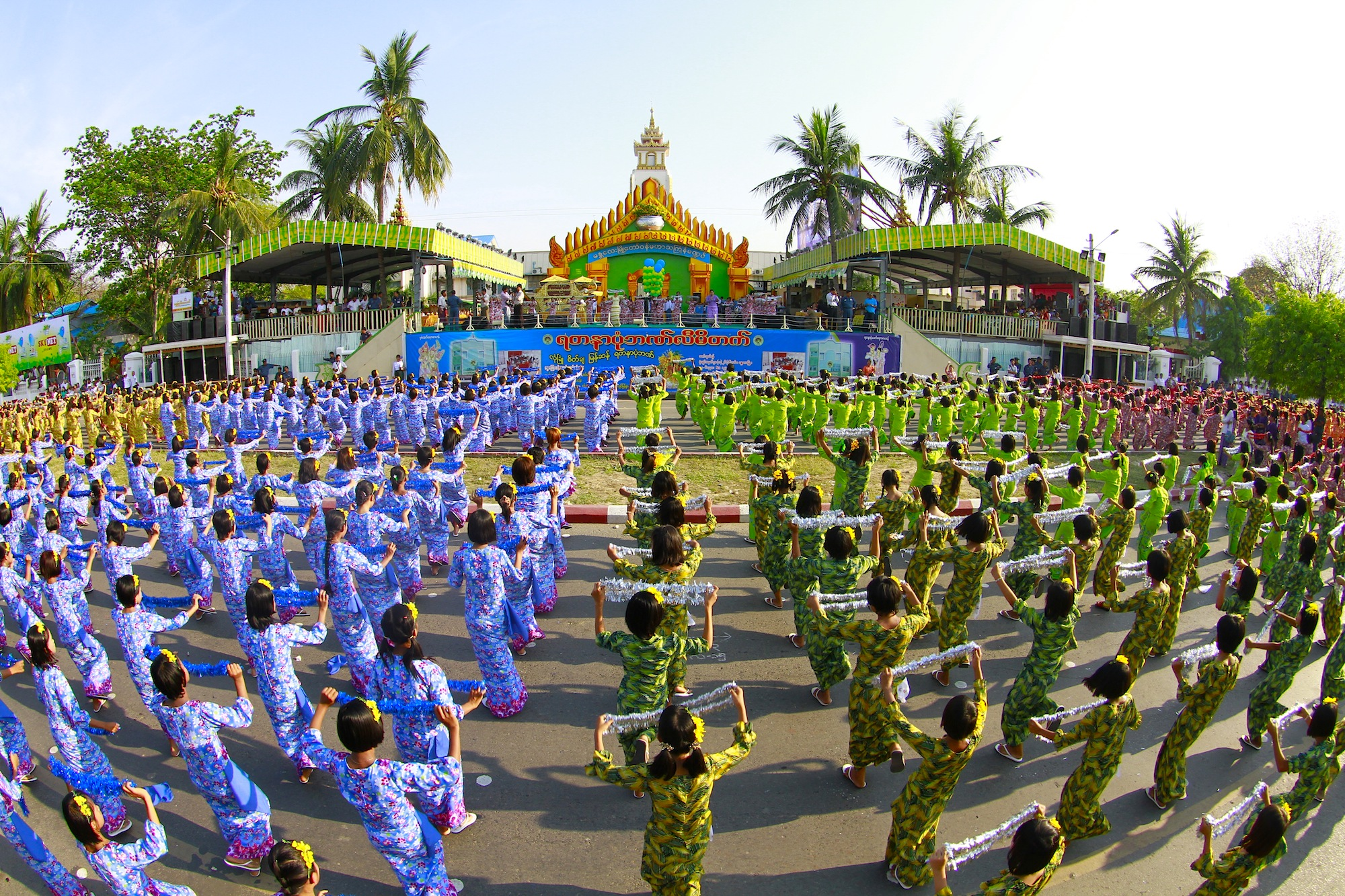
Burmese girls perform the Myanmar traditional yein dance with Myanmar dress in the opening ceremony of the Mandalay Thingyan Festival,2012.

Myanmar New Year Festival, known as Thingyan (သင်္ကြန်), is announced each year based on calculations from the traditional Myanmar lunisolar calendar, carefully determined by the Myanmar Calendar Calculation Team (ပေါင်နာအဖွဲ့). The festival usually begins around April 13 and lasts four to five days, depending on the alignment of the sun and traditional astrological interpretations.

Thingyan marks the transition of the sun from Pisces to Aries, symbolizing the end of the old year and the arrival of the new one. It is one of Myanmar's most important and widely celebrated festivals, deeply rooted in both Buddhist traditions and seasonal agricultural cycles. The water-throwing is more than just fun—it represents a symbolic cleansing of sins and bad luck from the previous year, helping people to start the new year fresh, spiritually and physically.

During this period, people across the country engage in various cultural and religious activities, such as building mandats (မဏ္ဍပ်) or water-splashing pavilions, performing traditional dances and songs, offering food and donations to monks, and releasing fish or birds to gain merit. It is also a time for family reunions, acts of kindness to elders, and community bonding. Though it is celebrated with energy and joy, Thingyan also carries a message of renewal, generosity, and peace, making it not just a national festival but a spiritual transition into a better year.

=== Thailand ===
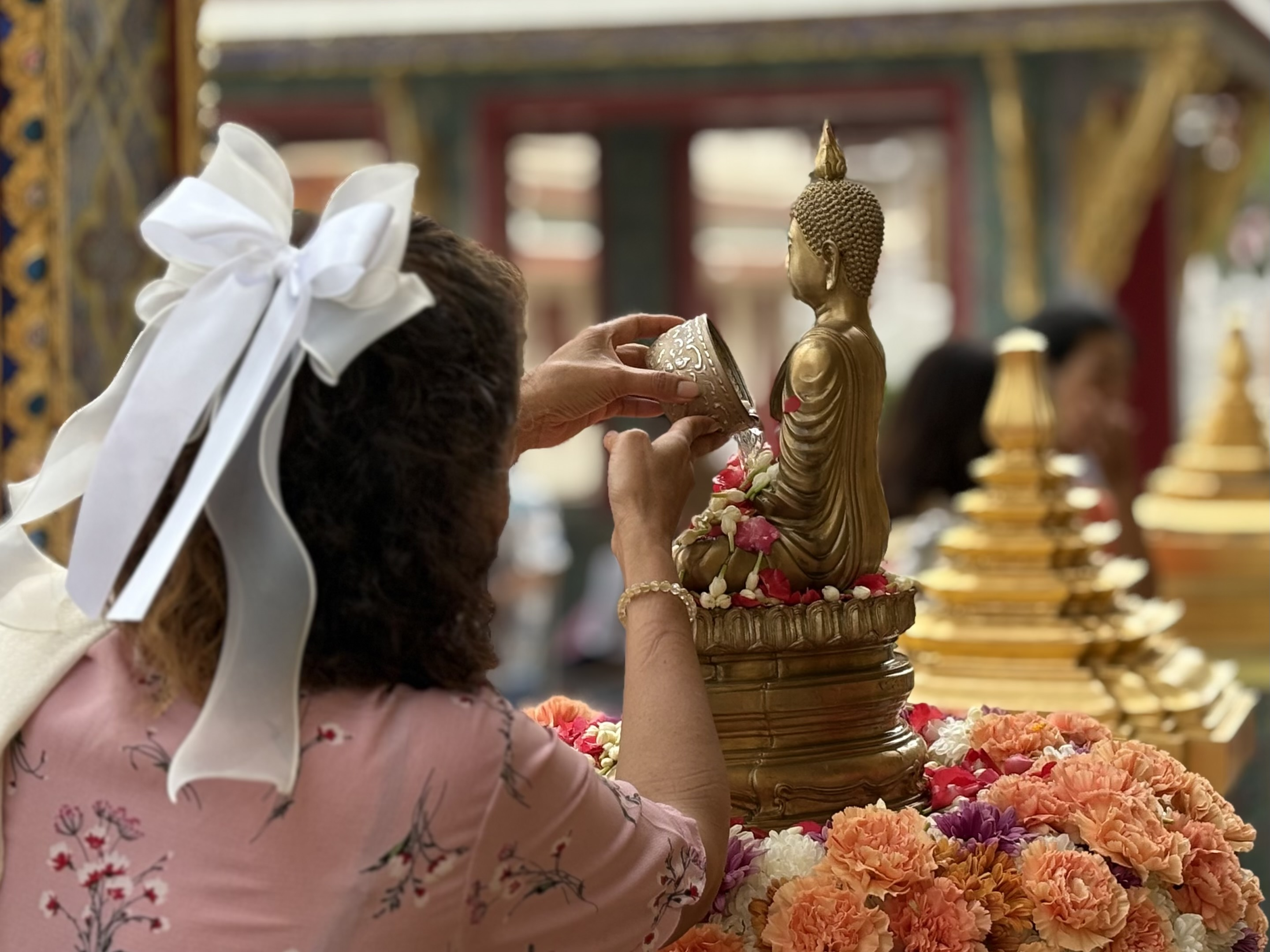
Bathing of a Buddha statue in a temple in Bangkok during Songkran

In Thailand, Songkran (สงกรานต์) refers to the sun's annual passing into the Aries constellation, the first sign of the Zodiac, which marks the traditional start of the new year. The Thai New Year is from 13 to 15 April. Occurring after the rice harvest, it is a time when people reunite with their families and pay their respects to older adults, ancestors, and sacred Buddha images. Pouring water is a significant act during Songkran, symbolizing cleansing, reverence, and good fortune. Other activities include bathing Buddha images, splashing water on family and friends, folk plays, games, music, and feasting.

=== Laos ===
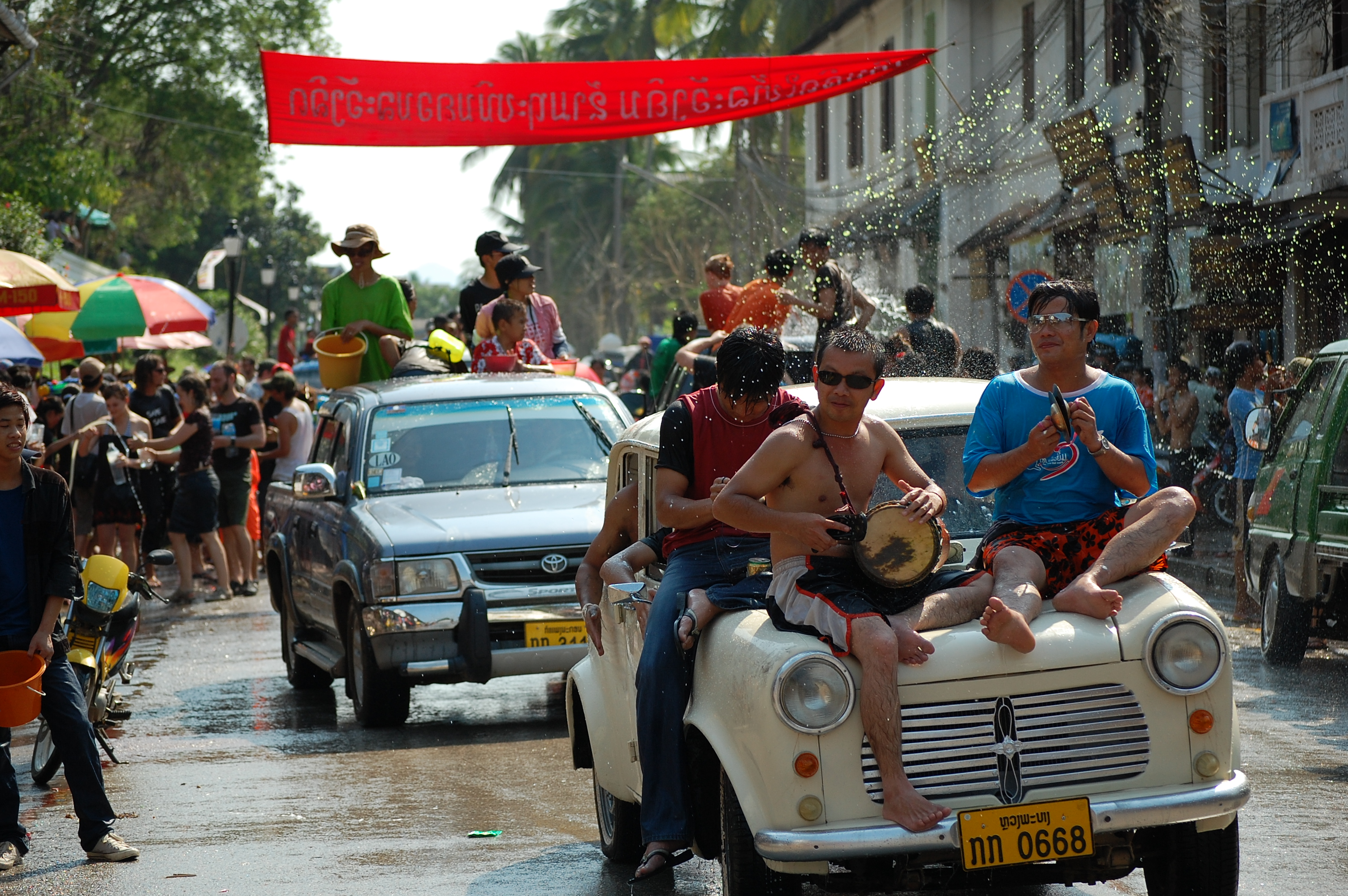
Lao New Year

The Lao New Year, called Pi Mai (ສົງກຣານ) in the Lao language, is celebrated every year from 13 to 15 April.

=== Cambodia ===
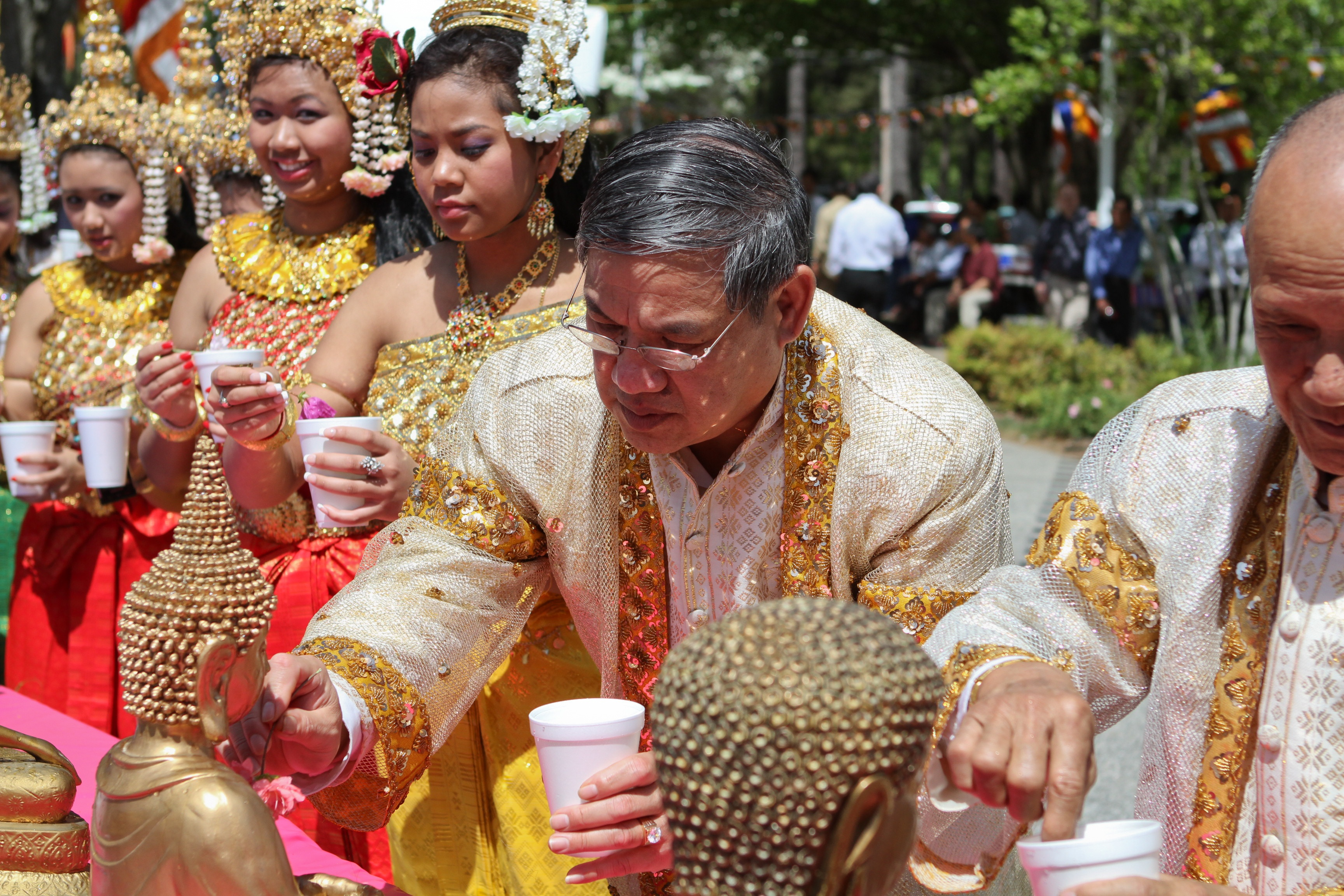
Khmer (Cambodia) new year

The "Water Festival" is often a confusing term for foreigners in Cambodia because the Khmer New Year in April is not normally referred to as the "Water Festival", unlike equivalent new year celebrations in neighbouring countries. Rather, the "Water Festival" in Cambodia usually refers to the festival Bon Om Thook (Khmer: ពិធីបុណ្យអុំទូក), focused on traditional boat racing, which usually takes place in November each year.

=== China ===
The Water Splashing Festival celebrated by the Dai people in Yunnan marks their New Year and lasts 3–7 days starting April 13. Festivities include dragon boat races, markets, sand art, lantern floating, and fireworks for good fortune.

The highlight is the third day's "Bathing the Buddha" ritual followed by a mutual water splashing in the streets. Water symbolizes purity and goodwill, and splashing others expresses wishes for luck and happiness.

=== Spain ===
La Batalla del Agua, held annually on June 23 in Lanjarón, Spain, is part of the San Juan Festival and coincides with the Summer Solstice. The event celebrates the town's natural spring water and involves a large-scale water fight at midnight using buckets, hoses, and water balloons, symbolizing purification and festivity. Accompanying activities include parades, music, dancing, and local cuisine. Similar to Southeast Asia’s Water Throwing Festival, both events use water to represent cleansing and community unity. La Batalla del Agua is a local, one-night celebration, while the Water Throwing Festival spans several days and includes religious rituals.

=== Vietnam ===
In Vietnam, Lễ hội làm chay is another water festival mainly celebrated in parts of Southern Vietnam. It is held January 14-16 of the Vietnamese lunar calendar, different to the one celebrating on April.

During this festivals, similarly like the other Southeast Asian water festivals, along the roads, many young people use spray hoses, brasses, and buckets to splash water on passersby. Some groups used trucks to carry water to splash around in the neighborhood.

=== Philippines ===
In the Philippines, several water festivals are held throughout the country such as the Wattah Wattah Festival in San Juan, Metro Manila, and the Regada Festival in the city of Cavite. It is held in honor of the feast of St. John the Baptist, locally known as San Juan Bautista, every 24th of June. It is a week-long festival that is popular for street parties where water is thrown at revelers.

== List of new years ==
Local name festival	Country	Begin	End
Pi Mai/Songkran	Laos	14 April	16 April
Songkran	Thailand	13 April	15 April
Sangken	Arunachal Pradesh, Assam (India)	14 April	16 April
Thingyan	Myanmar	13 April	16 April
Chaul Chnam Thmey	Cambodia	14 April	16 April
Poshuijie	Yunnan (China)	13 April	15 April
Sangrai	Bangladesh	14 April	14 April

== See also ==
- Bon Om Thouk - Boat Racing Water Festival in Cambodia
- Puthandu - Tamil New Year
- Holi - Indian festival of color & water
- Śmigus-dyngus - Polish water festival
- Vardavar - water festival in Armenia
- New Year
