= Sinhalese New Year =

Sri Lankan new year holiday

Sinhala New Year
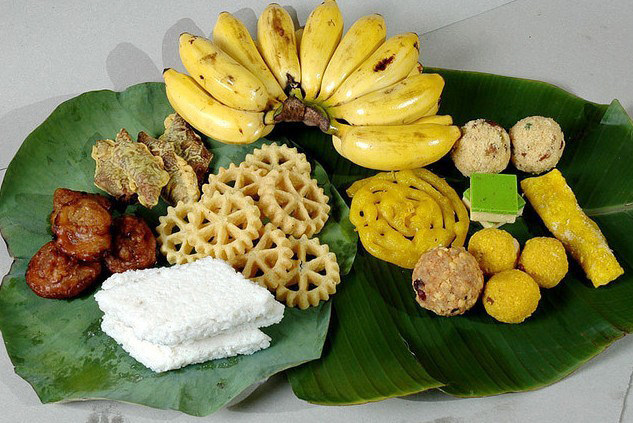
- "Aluth Awurudu" festival sweetmeats including kavum, kokis, and kiribath (milk rice)
- Official name: Sinhala: අලුත් අවුරුද්ද; Aluth Awurudda
- Observed by: Sinhalese
- Type: Cultural
- Celebrations: Games, family gathering, family meal, visiting friends and relatives, prayer
- Observances: The observed movement of the sun from Meena Rashiya (House of Pisces) to the Mesha Rashiya (House of Aries); Marks the end of the harvest season
- Date: 13 or 14 April, an auspicious date in the month of Bak (April) (by the Shalivahana era)
- Frequency: annual
- Related to: South and Southeast Asian solar New Year

Sinhala New Year, known as Aluth Awurudda (Sinhala: අලුත් අවුරුද්ද) in Sinhala, is a Sri Lankan holiday that celebrates the traditional New Year of the Sinhalese people. The timing of the Sinhala New Year coincides with the new year celebrations of many traditional calendars of South and Southeast Asia; thus, the festival has close semblance to other South and Southeast Asian New Years. The event is marked by two official public holidays. It is generally celebrated on the 13th or 14 April and traditionally begins at the sighting of the new moon. Following the holidays, most shops and businesses close for about a week as families and communities come together to celebrate.

The New Year in Sri Lanka is a traditional solar festival celebrated in mid-April, marking the transition of the sun from Meena Rashiya (Pisces) to Mesha Rashiya (Aries). It signifies the end of one solar year and the beginning of a new one, based on Sri Lankan astrological traditions.

The festival is closely linked to Sri Lanka’s agricultural cycle, as the main harvesting season traditionally ends in late March. As an expression of gratitude, the first portion of the harvest is symbolically offered to major religious institutions, including the Sri Maha Bodhi, the Temple of the Tooth Relic, Ruwanweli Maha Seya in Anuradhapura, and various Hindu temples.

A distinctive feature of the festival is Nonagathaya, a neutral period between the old and new years, during which work, business, and normal daily activities are stopped nationwide. During this time, people engage in religious observances, visit temples, and focus on spiritual and cultural practices. In many households, eating is also avoided as part of this observance.

Other traditional rituals include bathing with herbal oils for physical and spiritual cleansing, lighting the hearth at an astrologically determined time, and preparing and sharing traditional foods such as kiribath. The New Year also includes rituals for beginning work, financial transactions, and meals at nationally fixed auspicious times, symbolizing a collective fresh start.

== History ==
Cultural anthropological history of the 'Traditional New Year' which is celebrated in the month of April, goes back to an ancient period in Sri Lankan history. People think that the celebration of the new year is the change of thoughts too. Various beliefs, perhaps those associated with the fertility of the harvest, gave birth to many rituals, customs, and ceremonies connected with the New Year. The advent of Buddhism in the 3rd century BC led to a re-interpretation of the existing New Year activities in the Buddhism light. The majority of the people in the country are Buddhists, and as such, the Buddhistic outlook was predominant in transforming the New Year rites to what they are now.

Hinduism, on the other hand, existed side by side with Buddhism, in medieval times. New Year practices interpreted in the Hinduism way developed among the Hindus. Buddhism and re historically connected with each other. Their philosophies were running along parallel dimensions, except for certain ultimate truths concerning the self, the way to achieve emancipation and the nature of a creative god (which Buddhism denies) and nirvana. There was no serious contradiction in New Year rituals that are found among the Buddhists and Hindus.

The mythological backdrop of the New Year is probably based on Hindu literature. The Prince of Peace called Indradeva descends upon the earth to ensure peace and happiness. He comes in a white carriage wearing on his head a white floral crown seven cubits high. He first dips, like a returning space capsule plunges, breaking earth's gravity, into a `Kiri Sayura' or sea of milk.

Modern-day activities related to the celebration of the traditional New Year is based on auspicious times given by the astrologers. The New Year celebration, therefore, can be thought as a complex mix of Indigenous, Astrological, Hindu, and Buddhist traditions.

== Celebrations ==
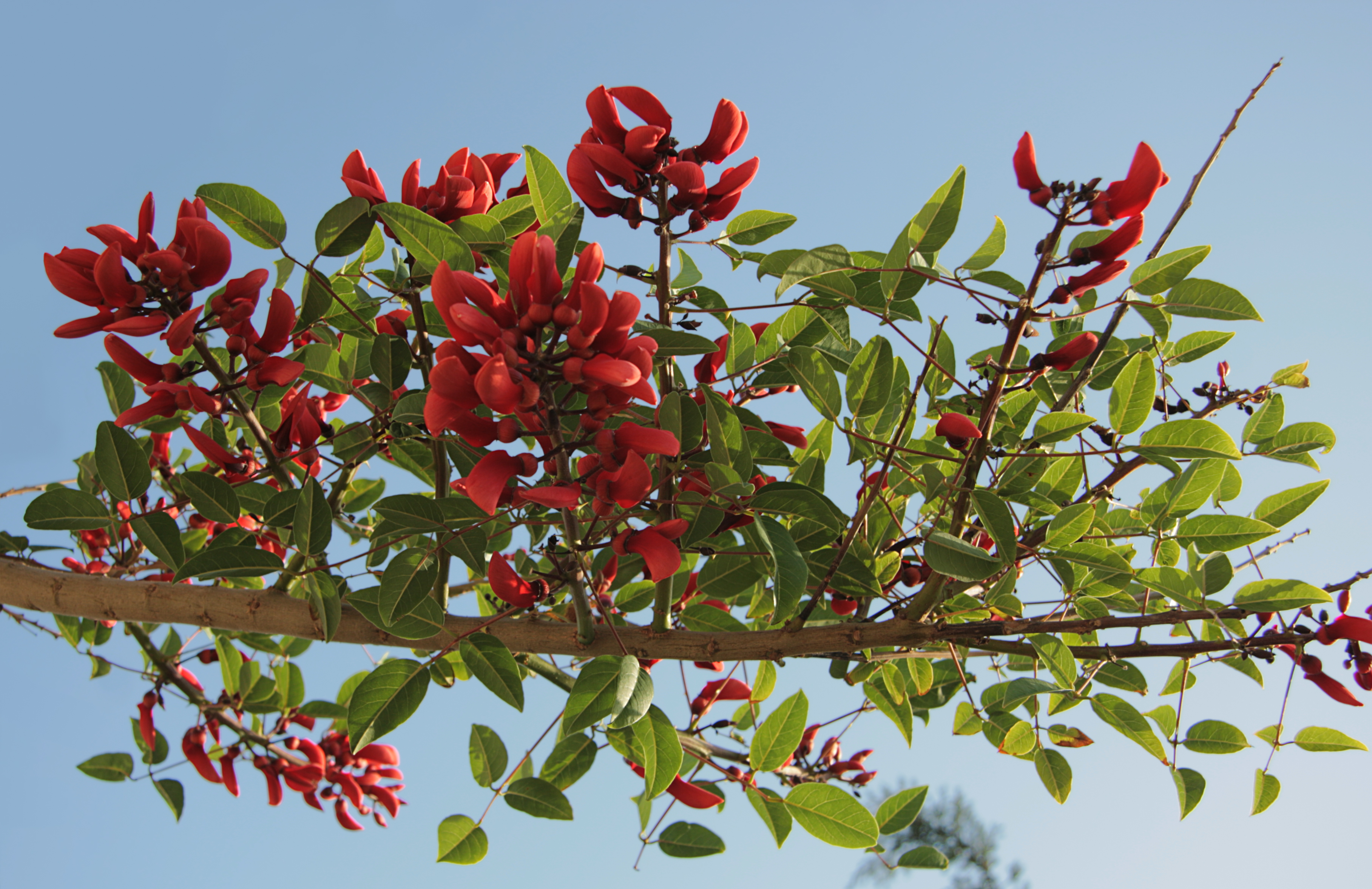
The blossoming flowers of the Yak Erabadu is associated with the advent of the New Year

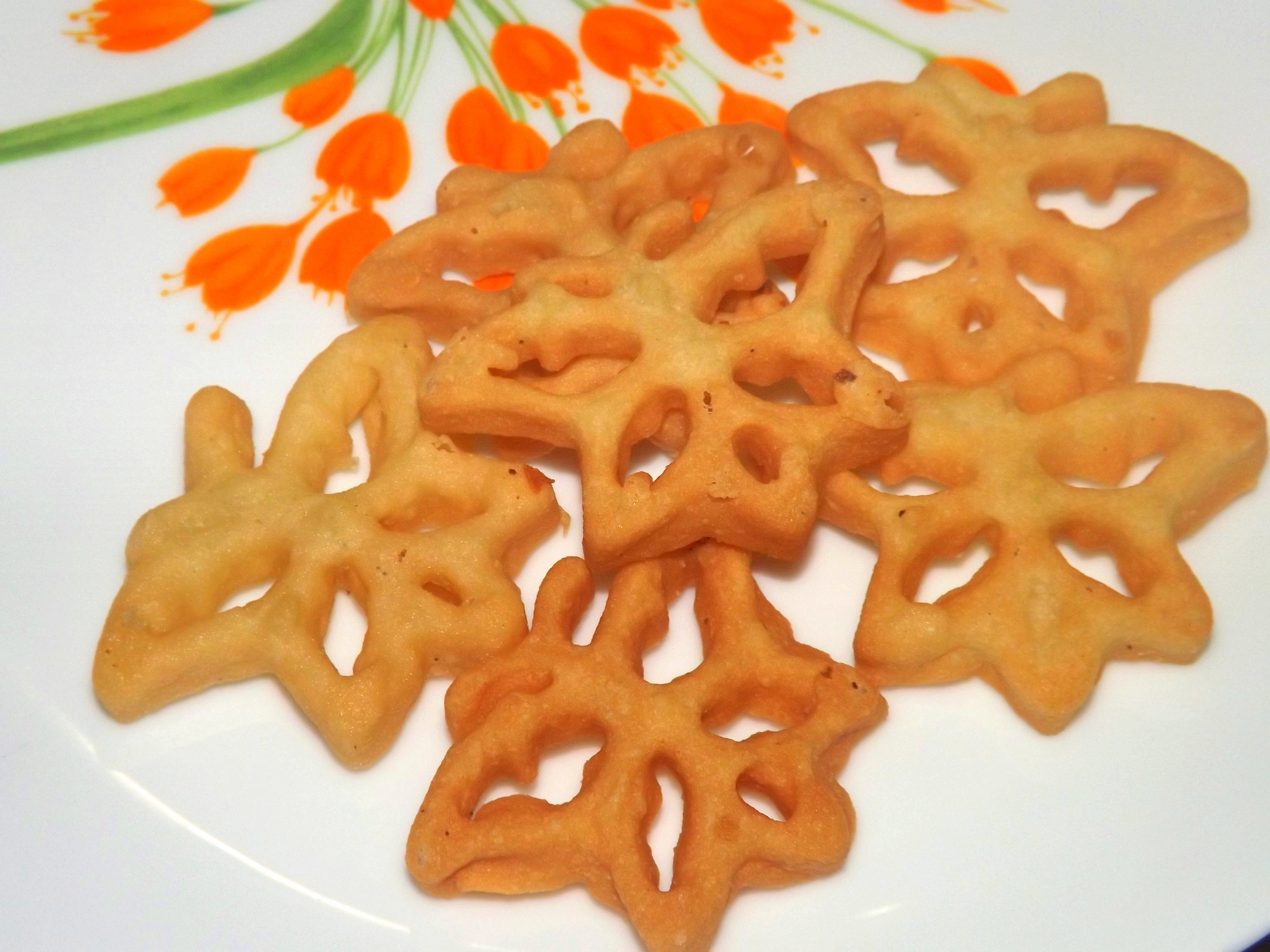
Kokis are a popular snack eaten during the New Year

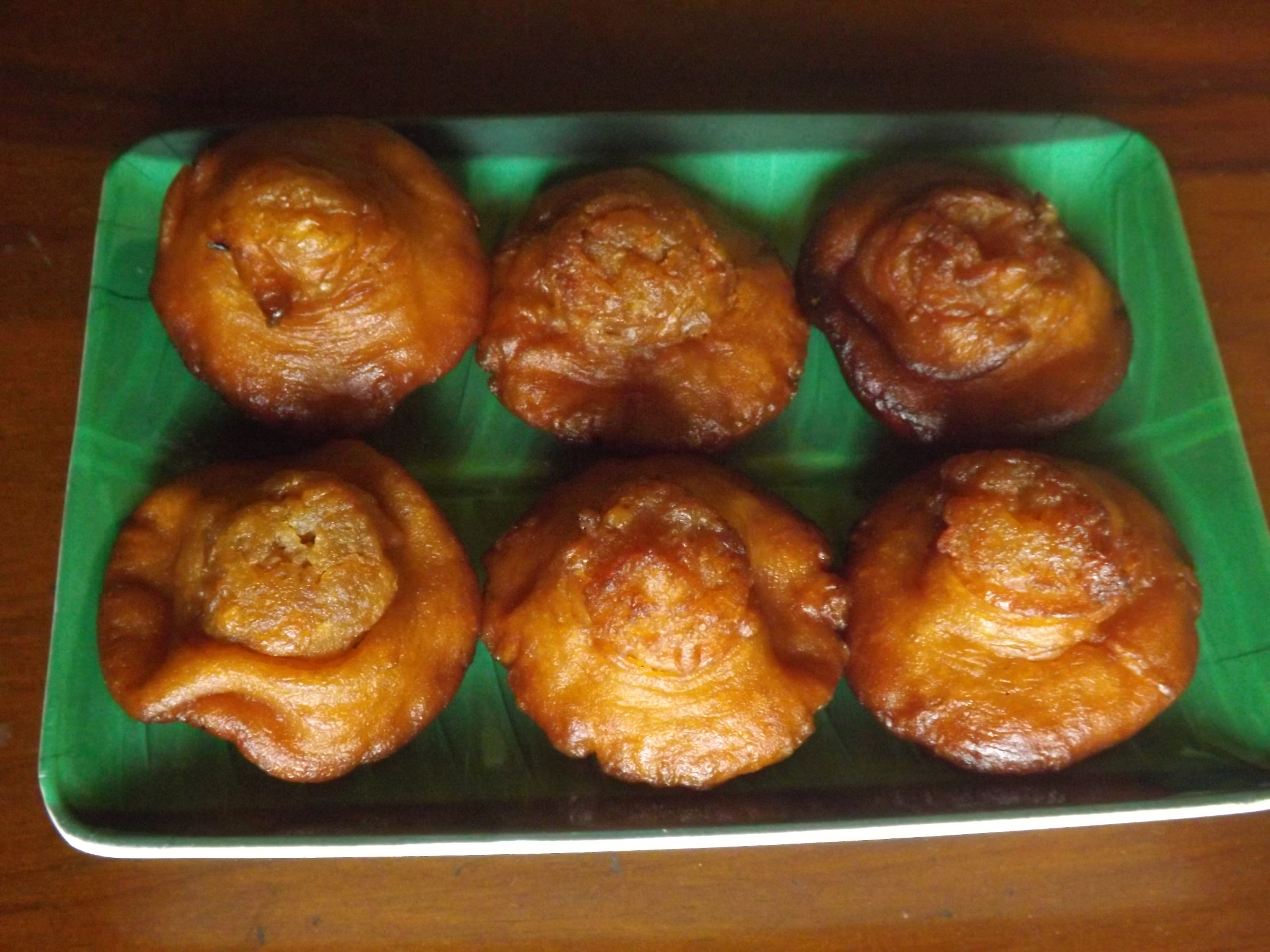
Konda Kavum another dish eaten during the New Year

The month of Bak, which represents prosperity in the Sinhala calendar (or in the month of April according to the Gregorian calendar), is when the sun moves (in an astrological sense) from the Meena Rashiya (House of Pisces) to the Mesha Rashiya (House of Aries) in the celestial sphere; people begin celebrating the Sinhala New Year, known as Aluth Awurudda in Sinhala. It marks the end of the harvest season and also coincides with one of two instances when the sun is directly above Sri Lanka.

However, unlike the celebration of the new Gregorian calendar year at midnight on 31 December, the Sinhala traditional New Year begins at a time determined by astrological calculations. Also unlike 31st night celebrations, where an old year ends at midnight and new year begins immediately afterwards; the ending of the old year, and the beginning of the new year occur several hours apart from one another (this span of time is usually 12 hours and 48 minutes, which starts when the sun, as a disk, starts to cross the astrological boundary between 'House of Pisces' and 'House of Aries' and ends when the crossing is complete. The halfway point is considered as the dawn of the new year). This period is, referred to as the Nonagathe (or the 'neutral period' or 'Auspicious Time' ). During this time Sri Lankans are, according to tradition, encouraged to refrain from material pursuits, and engage solely in either religious activities or traditional games.

Cultural rituals begin shortly after the beginning of the Sinhala New Year, with the cleaning of the house and lighting of an oil lamp. In some communities, women congregate to play upon the Raban (a type of a drum) to announce the incipient change in the year. Families carry out a variety of rituals, the exact timings of which are determined by astrological calculations - from lighting the fire to making the Kiribath (milk rice) to entering into the first business transaction and eating the first morsels. The rituals vary slightly based on the locale. However, the core of the celebrations remains the same. The approach of each auspicious time for various rituals is heralded by the unmistakable sign of very loud firecrackers. Fireworks play a major role in the celebration of the Sinhala New Year.

Once the important rituals are done, the partying begins as families mingle in the streets, homes are thrown open and children are let out to play. The ubiquitous plantain is dished out alongside celebratory feasts of Kavum (small oil cake) and Kokis (crisp and light sweetmeat, originally from the Netherlands). However, the extent of outdoor activities depends largely on the neighbourhood. The suburban communities tend to have such social gatherings than urban or city dwellers. The blossoming of the flowers of the Yak Erabadu is associated with the advent of the Sinhala New Year.

As Aluth Awurudda is an important national holiday, the celebrations are given wide coverage and patronage from state-owned media as well as private media. Programs dedicating to celebrations of the New Year are broadcast for at least 2 days straight. Media Companies organize special New Year festivals in different parts around the country throughout the month of April.

== Harvest Festival ==
The date upon which the Sinhala New Year occurs, while determined by astrological calculations, also tends to coincide with one of the paddy harvest seasons. For farming communities, the traditional new year is a festival of harvest as well.

== Related festivals in other cultures ==
Aluth Awurudda coincides with the new years in many other South Asian calendars, including:

- Assamese New Year, or Bohag Bihu (Assam, India)
- Bengali New Year, or Pohela Boishakh (Bangladesh and West Bengal, India)
- Burmese New Year, or Thingyan (Burma)
- Khamti New Year, or Sangken (Arunachal Pradesh, India)
- Khmer New Year, or Choul Chnam Thmey (Cambodia)
- Lao New Year, or Pi Mai Lao (Laos)
- Maithili New Year, or Jude Shital (Mithila, India)
- Malayali New Year, or Vishu (Kerala, India)
- Nepali New Year, or Baisakh Ek Gatey or Bisket Jatra (Nepal)
- Odia New Year, or Maha Vishuva Sankranti (Odisha, India)
- Tamil New Year, or Puthandu (Tamil Nadu, India and Sri Lankan Tamils)
- Thai New Year, or Songkran (Thailand)
- Tulu New Year, or Bisu Parba (Tulu Nadu region of Karnataka, India )

== See also ==
- Traditional games of Sri Lanka, several of which are played during the Sinhala and Tamil New Year
- List of Buddhist festivals
- South and Southeast Asian New Year
