= South and Southeast Asian solar New Year =

In many countries of South Asia and South East Asia, the traditional new year is calculated on the sun's entry into the constellation Aries as per the regional Hindu calendars or Buddhist calendars. This event is known by a variety of names in different nations, including Sankranti and Vaisakhi in India, Pohela Boishakh in Bangladesh and India, Aluth Avurudda in Sri Lanka, Puthandu in India and Sri Lanka, Thingyan in Myanmar, Moha Sangkran in Cambodia, Songkran in Thailand, and Pi Mai in Laos.

In modern times, it is usually reckoned around 14 April.

== Origins ==
As most countries and cultures of South and Southeast Asia lie within the Indian cultural sphere, the development of their traditional calendars has been strongly influenced by the Hindu calendar. As in many other calendars, the New Year was based on the northern hemisphere vernal equinox (the beginning of spring). However, the Hindu calendar year was based the movement of the sun relative to the stars), while the Western Gregorian calendar is based on the tropical year (the cycle of seasons).

In ancient times, the sun's entry into Aries coincided with the equinox. However, due to the earth's axial precession, the sidereal year is slightly longer than the tropical year, causing the dates to gradually drift apart. Today, the sun's entry into Aries occurs around 18 April, according to astronomical definitions. Some traditional calendars are still marked by the sun's actual movements while others have since been fixed to the Gregorian calendar.

The sun's entry into Aries is known as meṣa saṅkrānti in Sanskrit and is observed as Mesha Sankranti in India.

== Celebrations ==
The specific New Year observances include:

- In India:
  - Navreh: Kashmir
  - Bohag Bihu: Assam
  - Poila Baishakh: West Bengal, east and northeastern India.
  - Maha Bishuba Sankranti: Odisha
  - Sangken: Khamti, Singpho, Khamyang, Tangsa in Arunachal Pradesh and Tai Phake, Tai Aiton, and Turung in Assam
  - Bwisagu: Bodoland region of Assam
  - Buisu: Tripura
  - Gudi Padwa: Maharashtra and Goa
  - Bizhu: Chakmas in Mizoram and Tripura
  - Ugadi: Andhra Pradesh, Karnataka, Telangana
  - Puthandu: Tamil Nadu and Puducherry
  - Vishu: Kerala
  - Bisu: Tulu Nadu region of Karnataka and Kerala
  - Jur Sital: Mithila region of Bihar
  - Vaisakhi: Punjab, north and central India
  - Sangrain: Mog (Marma) in Tripura

In other South Asian countries:

  - Aluth Avurudda or Puthandu: Sri Lanka
  - Bisket Jatra or Baisakh Ek Gatey: Nepal
  - Cheti Chand: Sindhi Hindus in Pakistan
  - Pohela Baishakh: Bangladesh
  - Bizhu: Chakmas in Bangladesh
  - Sangrain: Mog (Marma) in Bangladesh
- In Southeast Asia:
  - Thingyan: Myanmar
  - Pi Mai: Laos
  - Choul Chnam Thmey: Cambodia
  - Songkran: Thailand
  - Water-Sprinkling Festival: Dais in Sipsongpanna in Yunnan, China

== Gallery ==
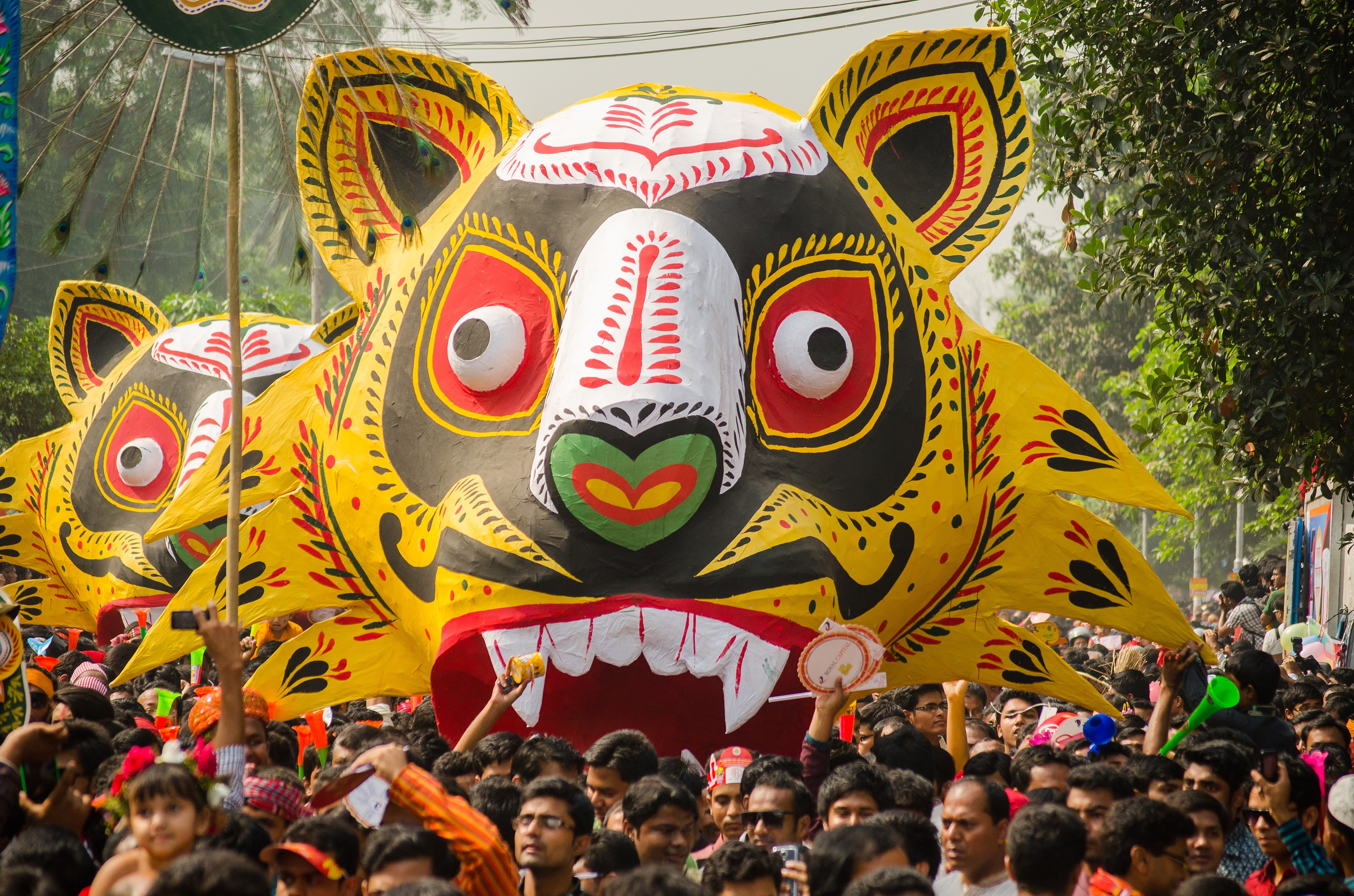
Mongal Shobhajatra on Pohela Boishakh in Dhaka, Bangladesh

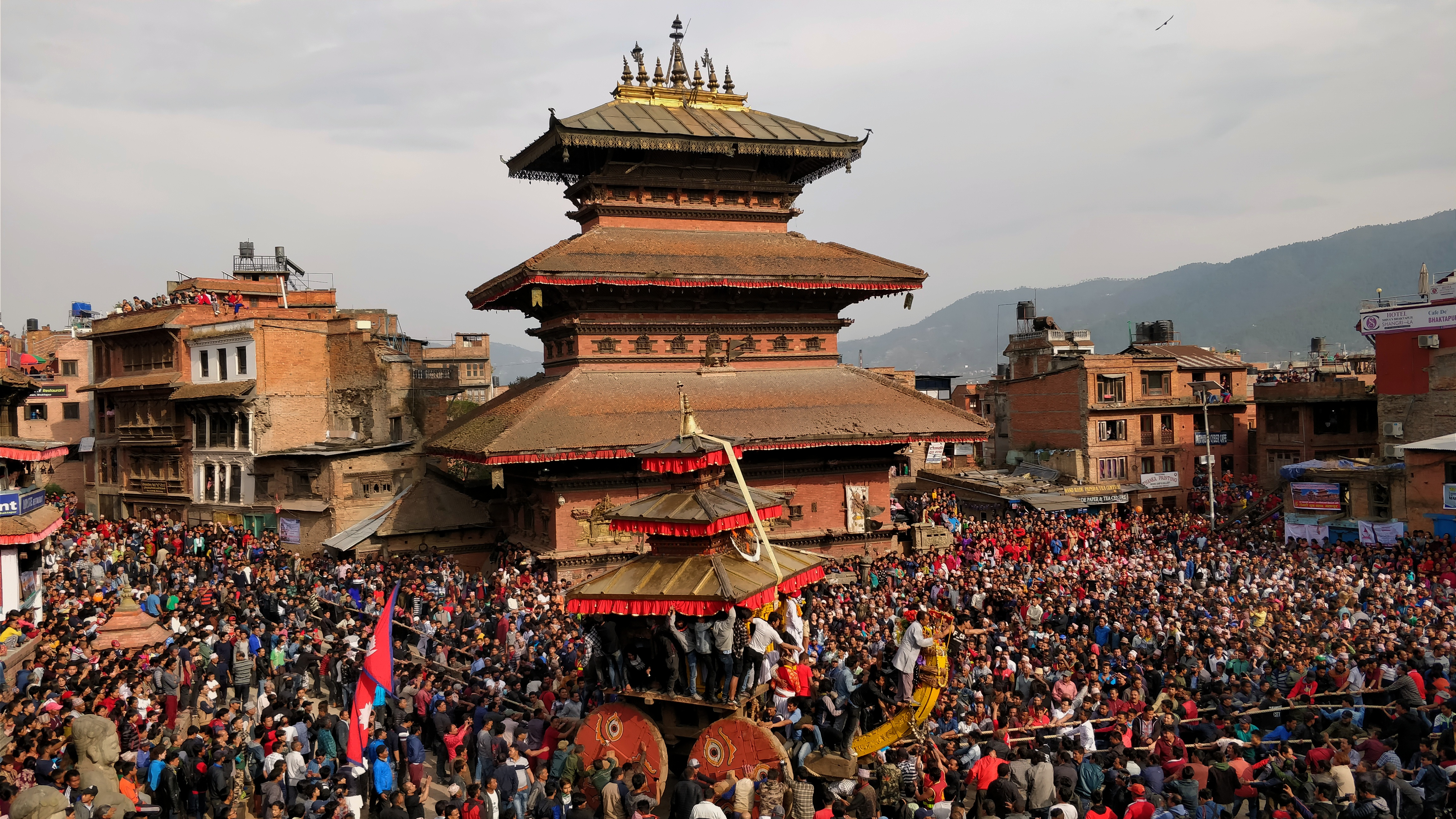
Biska Jatra signifies the start of Nepali new year

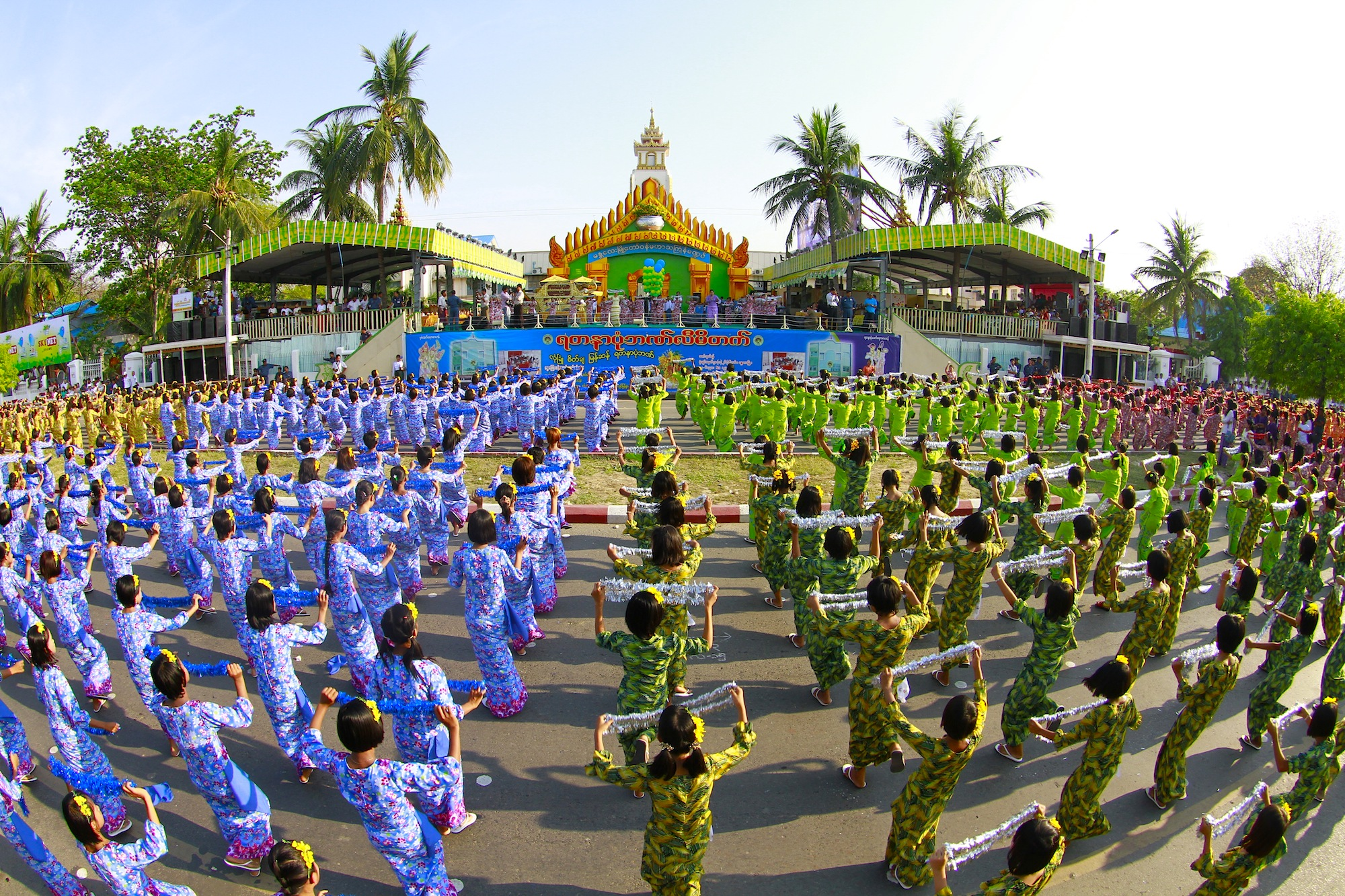
Myanmar performing traditional dance for the opening ceremony of the Thingyan Water Festival

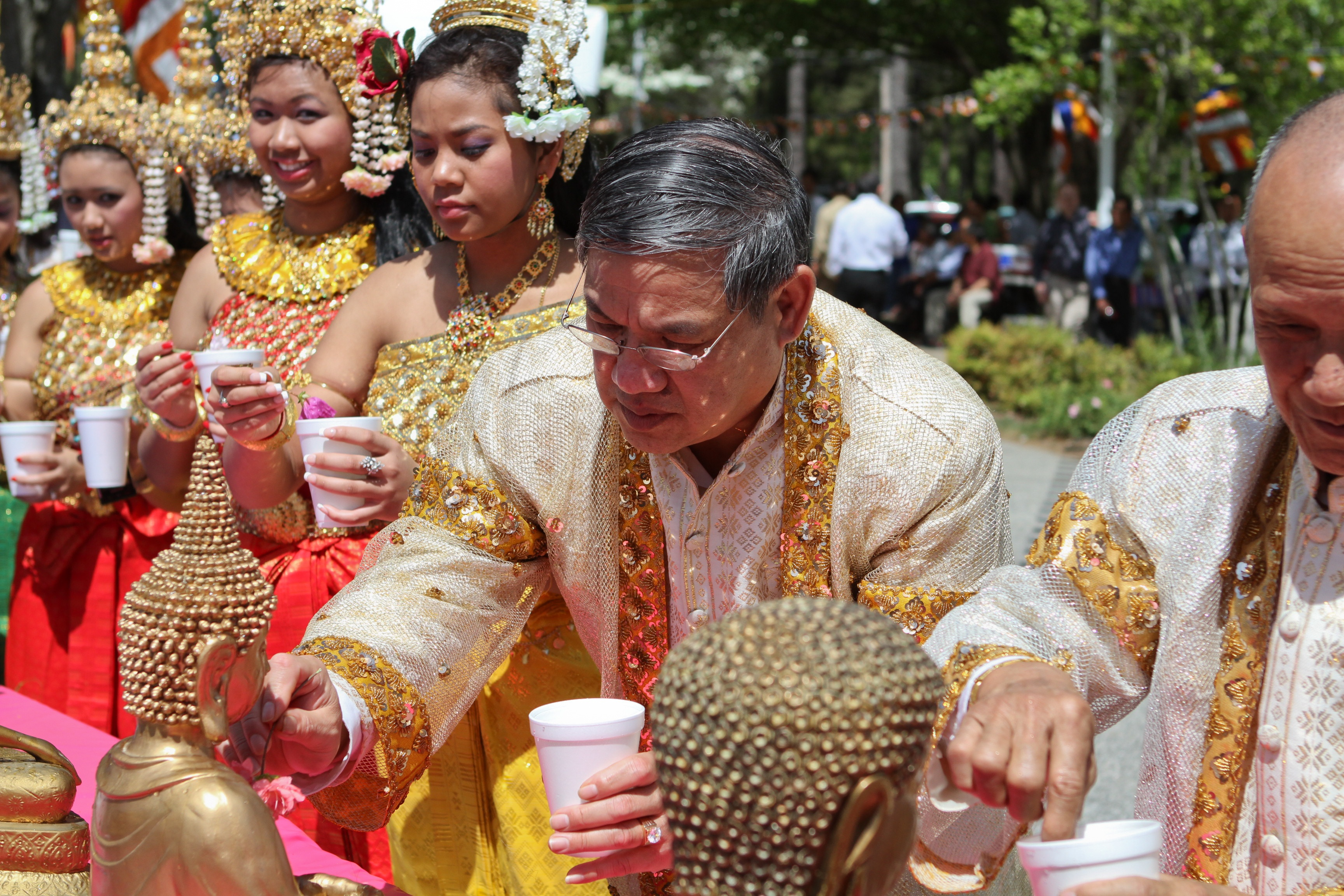
Elders cleanse statues of the Buddha with perfumed water in Cambodia

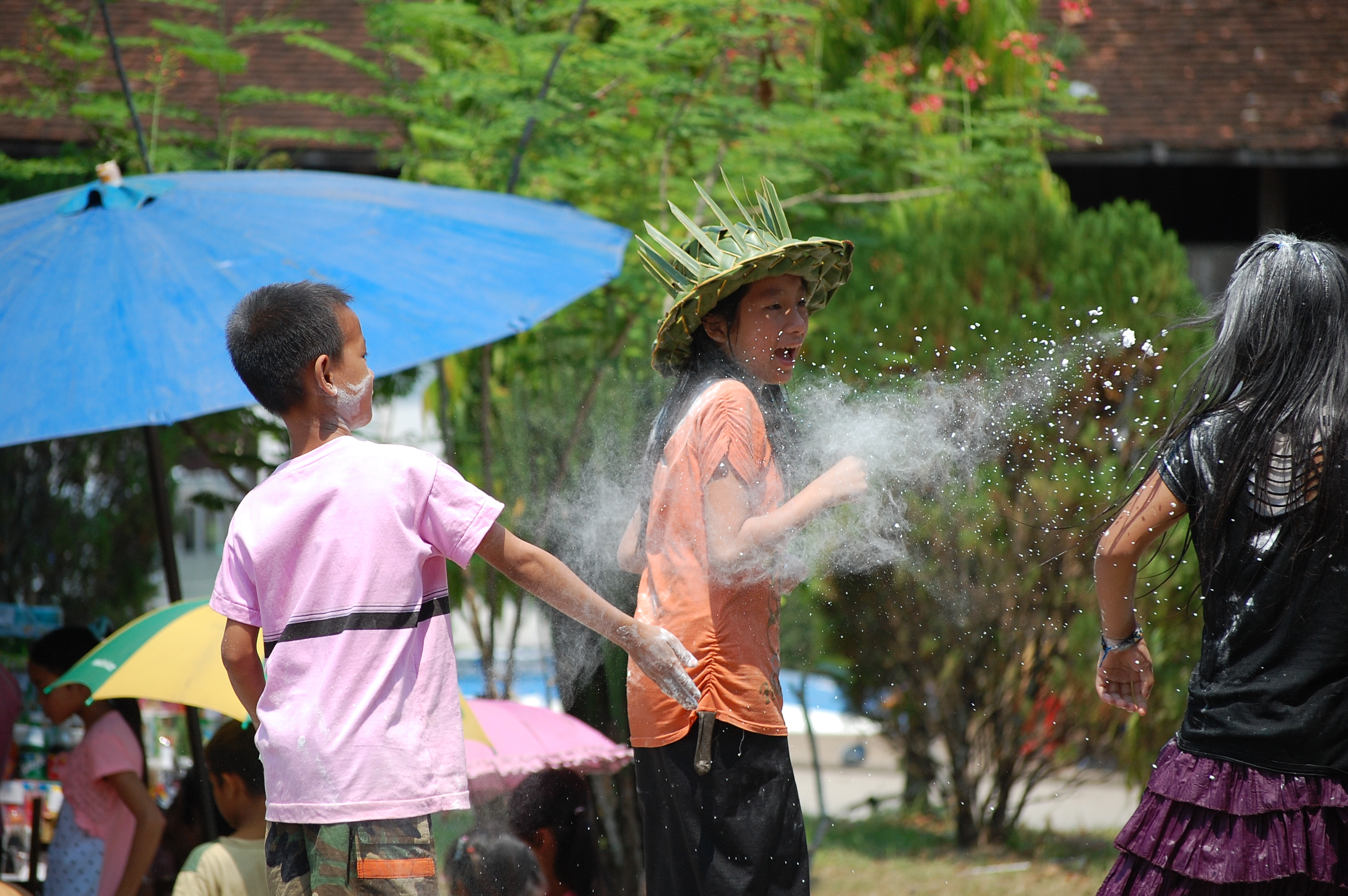
Flour throwing in Laos

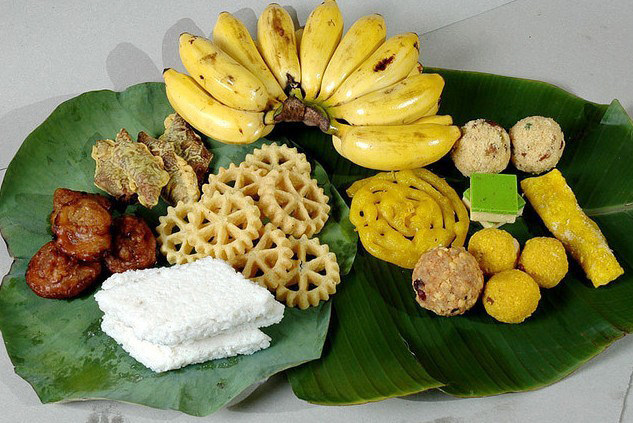
Avurudu festival sweetmeats in Sri Lanka

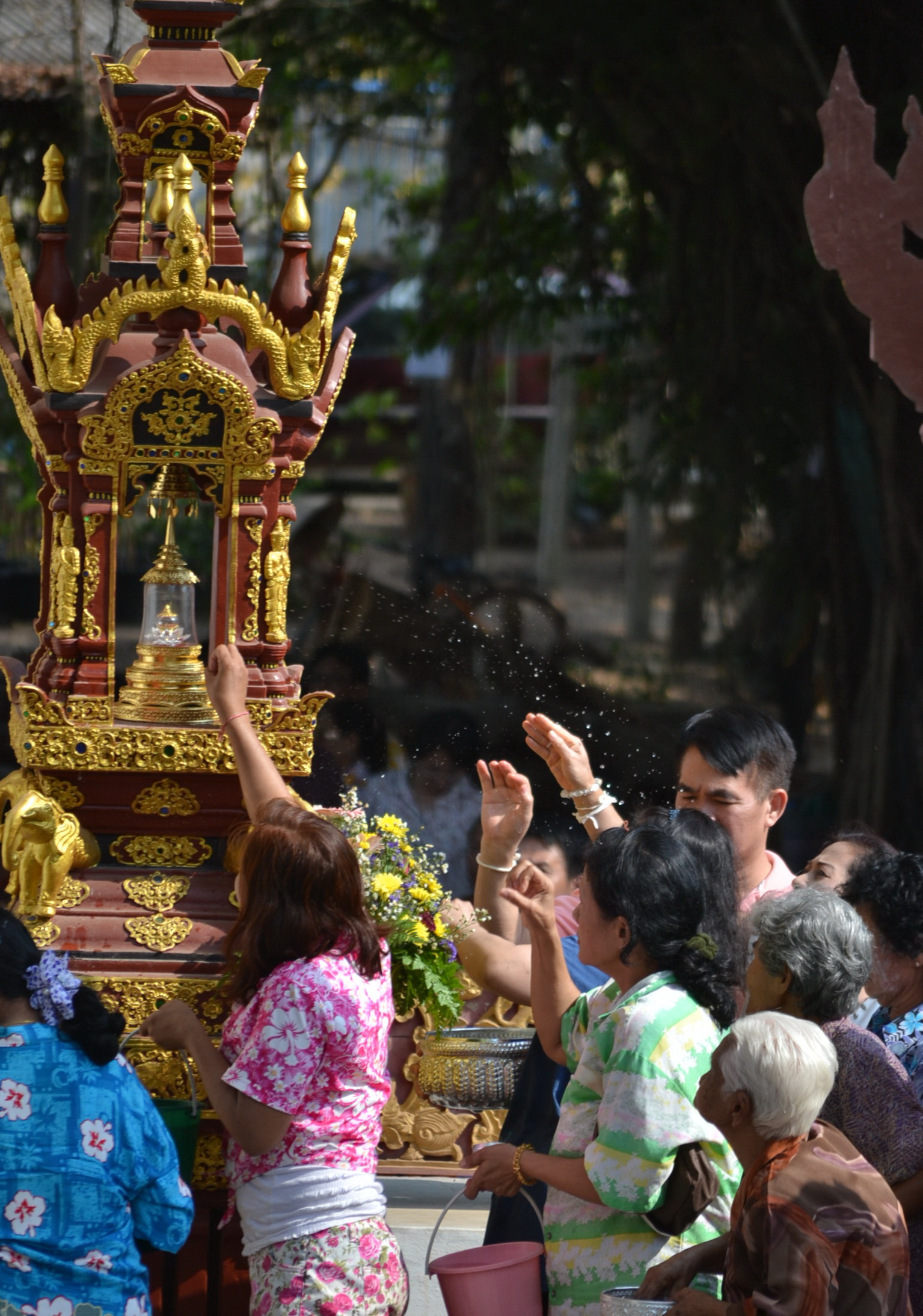
Sprinking water onto Buddha relics during the Songkran Festival in Thailand

== See also ==
- Indian New Year's days
- Water Festival
- Sidereal and tropical astrology
