= Sangken =

Festival in Arunachal Pradesh

- Official name: Sangken Festival
- Observed by: Khamti, Singpho, Tangsa, Khamyang, Phake, Aiton in Northeast India and Northern Myanmar
- Significance: Marks the Tai New Year
- Date: 13/14 April
- Frequency: annual
- Related to: Thingyan, Sangrain, Songkran, Water-Sprinkling Festival, Lao New Year, Cambodian New Year

The Sangken festival is celebrated in Arunachal Pradesh and parts of Assam, India and in Kachin, Sagaing region of Myanmar as the traditional New Year's Day from 14 to 16 April by the Theravada Buddhist Communities. It coincides with the New Year of many calendars. The Sangken festival is celebrated by the Khamti, Singpho, Khamyang, Tangsa tribes of Arunachal Pradesh, and Tai Phake, Tai Aiton, and Tai Turung communities of Assam. Sangken generally falls in the month of 'Nuean Ha', the fifth month of the year of the Tai lunisolar calendar coinciding with the month of April. It is celebrated in the last days of the old year and the New Year begins on the day just after the end of the festival.

== New Year Traditions ==
The main attraction of the festival is splashing clean water, which is the symbol of peace and purity. The images of Buddha are taken out and after the ceremonial bath. The procession is accompanied by drums, dances and enjoyment. The holy bath of Buddha is an auspicious event in the festival. The celebration takes place for three consecutive days. During the celebration the locals make homemade sweet and distribute them. The exchange of gifts is also a common trait of the festival. There are festivals other than Sangken celebrated throughout the year calendar. Some of the festivals are namely: POI-PEE-MAU (Tai or Dai New Year), MAI-KASUNG-PHAI, KHAO-WA, POAT-WA, etc.

Every festive occasion or celebration of the Buddhist people revolves around the principles and teachings of Buddha. All its socio-cultural activities have been truly religious. The essence of festivals lies in bringing people together and spreading the intrinsic values of their cultures and traditions. Being followers of Buddha, the Buddhist people are lovers of peace and harmony. Thus, Sangken has always unfolded the message of peace, harmony and unity. Their decency and craftsmanship and their cuisine reveal their love and taste of food, while their sports show their adeptness in the art of games.

The Tai Phakes is a lesser known Buddhist population of Assam. With its microscopic existence of less than 2000 souls, they mostly dwell in villages. In a constantly changing world they have tried to keep up, all the while trying to maintain their ways of life, tradition and culture.

== The Three Days ==
Before the beginning of the Sangken festival, a temporary shrine called 'Kyongfra' is constructed for keeping the idols of Buddha during Sangken. In this Kyongfra during Sangken, clean water is sprinkled through a specially designed water fountain called the 'Lungkong'. Clean and scented water poured through the fountain is sprinkled over the idols of Buddha kept inside the Kyongfra. This water, which has washed the Gods, is collected as holy water by the devotees. Sangken festival is celebrated for three consecutive days. On the first day and at an auspicious time, the images of Buddha are taken out of the shrine, given a ceremonial bath and placed in the 'Kyongfra’ to the accompaniment of drums and cymbals. People pray, offer sweets and food as offerings in the temple and then distribute sweets and goodwill amongst all by pouring water over each other. Water is also poured over all the holy objects, including the Boddhi tree, the Sailiks ropes of the holy book), Chausangphau-upuk and the Sammukathing. Water is also poured on Bhikkhus (monk) to invoke their blessings for good luck, good health, peace and harmony throughout the year.

On the final day of the Sangken festival at the appointed time, the images are taken back to their original places and this marks the end of the old year. The Sangken festival marks a farewell to the old year and a warm welcome to the New Year.

The New Year is welcomed with community prayers and feast during the ‘Poi Sangken’ celebrated after the end of the festival. This day is celebrated with great devotion and enthusiasm by all and marked by people going to the monastery to wash and clean up the shrine, idols and sprinkle holy water in the premises and a community feast which follows. This festival is dedicated to the worship of Buddha so that he can bless mankind with prosperity.

== Related festivals ==
=== Poi cheng ken ===
Poi cheng ken is the traditional spring festival of the Tai-Ahom people observed in the Ahom month Duin-Ha of Sexagenary cycle. This festival involves washing things especially bathing the household cattles, commemorates the ancestors and worshipping the insignia Chum Pha Rueng Sheng Mueang. The rituals of Cheng Ken are described in the ancient manuscript Khyek Lai Bet. As mentioned:

Duin ha jao pai ka duin ruk Poi cheng ken ao ma, hu ap nam, khai ap nam...., lit. '‘the month of Duin-ha is gone. The Poi cheng ken came in the month of Duin-ruk. Cows and buffaloes are washed with water.'

=== Songkran ===
Sangken is also seen to be celebrated abroad. Many Buddhist exist elsewhere where this festival is celebrated with enthusiasm. Sangken is celebrated as Songkran in other South East Asian countries. Songkran is a new year in the countries like Thailand, Laos, etc., while the Tai Phake celebrate Sangken to invoke the blessings of the Buddha for protection of the mankind from the evils, for peace, harmony, good luck and good health.

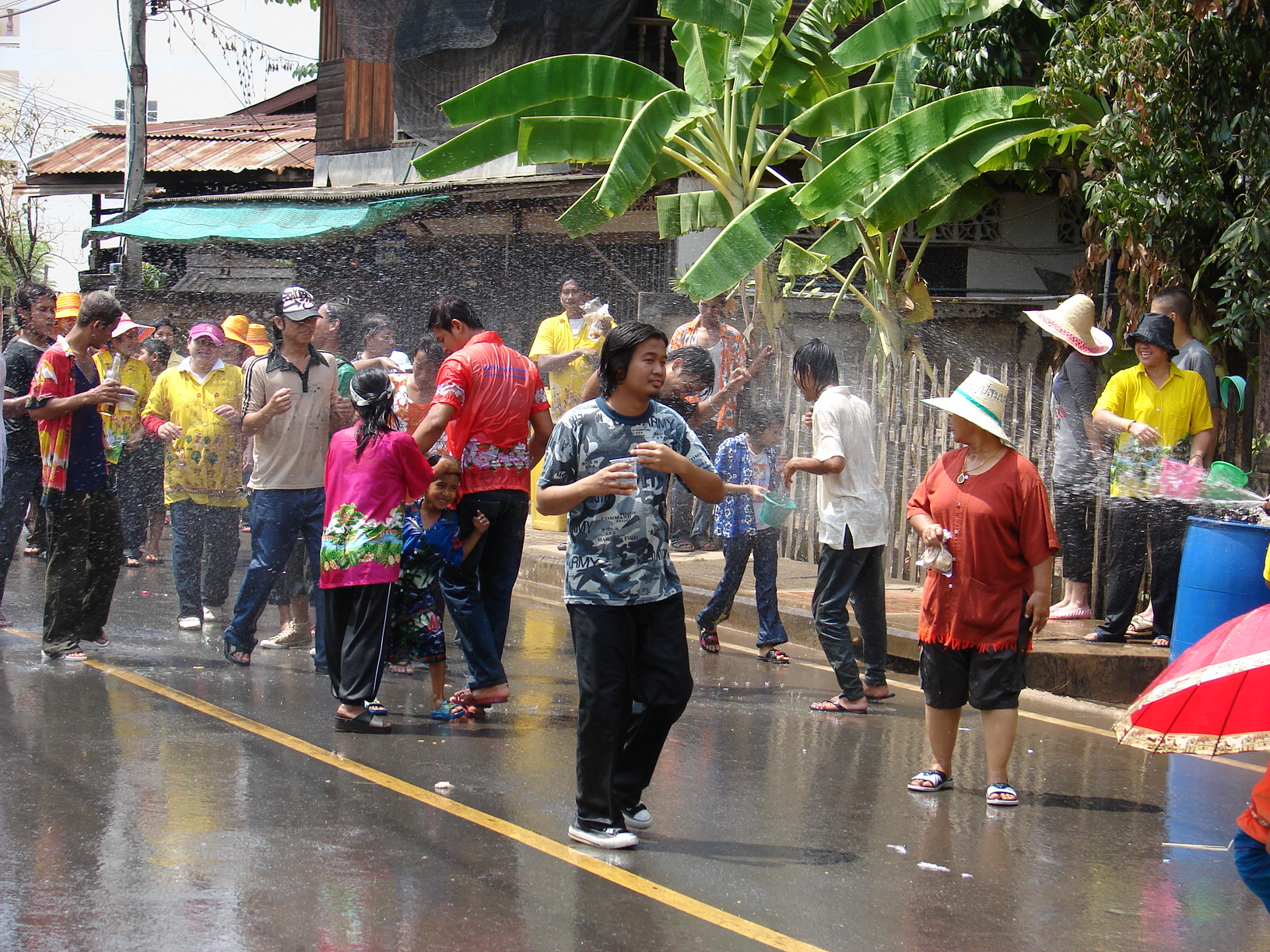
Sangken festival similar to Songkran of Southeast Asia

== See also ==
- South and Southeast Asian solar New Year
- Indian New Year's days
