= Water-Sprinkling Festival =

Traditional New Year festival of the Dai people

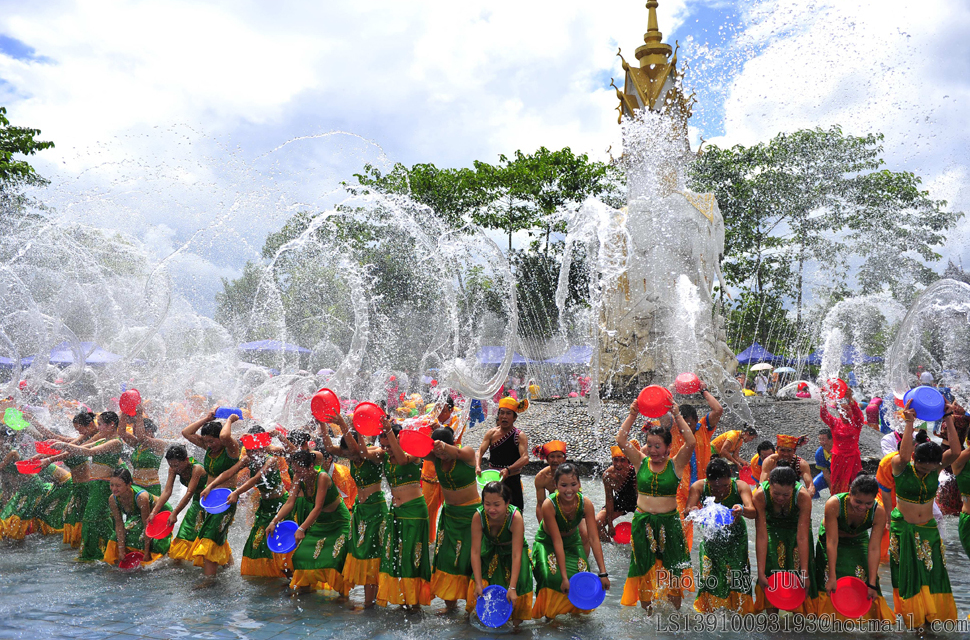
- Water Sprinkling festival in Yunnan
- Also called: Dai New Year
- Observed by: Dai people
- Significance: Marks the Dai New Year
- Begins: 13 April
- Ends: 15 April
- Date: 13 April
- Duration: 3 days
- Frequency: annual
- Related to: Sangken, Thingyan

The Water-Sprinkling Festival or Water-Splashing Festival was (simplified Chinese: 泼水节; traditional Chinese: 潑水節; pinyin: Pōshuǐ Jié), is a major and traditional festival of the Dai ethnic group marking the New Year. The Dai are an ethnic minority of China who primarily live in the Xishuangbanna Dai Autonomous Prefecture and Dehong Dai and Jingpo Autonomous Prefecture in southern Yunnan, and their predominant religion is Theravada Buddhism. This festival occurs on the 6th month of the Dai calendar, which usually corresponds to mid-April of the Gregorian calendar. Additionally, it is known as the Festival for Bathing the Buddha, and typically lasts for three days.

On the first day, a variety of activities such as dragon boat races (held on the Lancang River), setting off of Dai rockets (放高升; fàng gāoshēng), and cultural and artistic performances are carried out. On the second day, water-splashing activities are enjoyed. The third and final day also coincides with New Year's Day, where people dress up in traditional garb and visit the temple. Water-splashing activities are carried out in the afternoon, where firstly, the women would clean statues of Buddha with water to obtain blessings; thereafter, individuals splash water on each other to symbolise not only good fortune, but also the "cleansing of illnesses and disasters". Furthermore, men and women take part in activities such as the exchange of small gifts and "losing of items", which are believed to bring good luck. People perform masked dances to frighten away evil spirits.

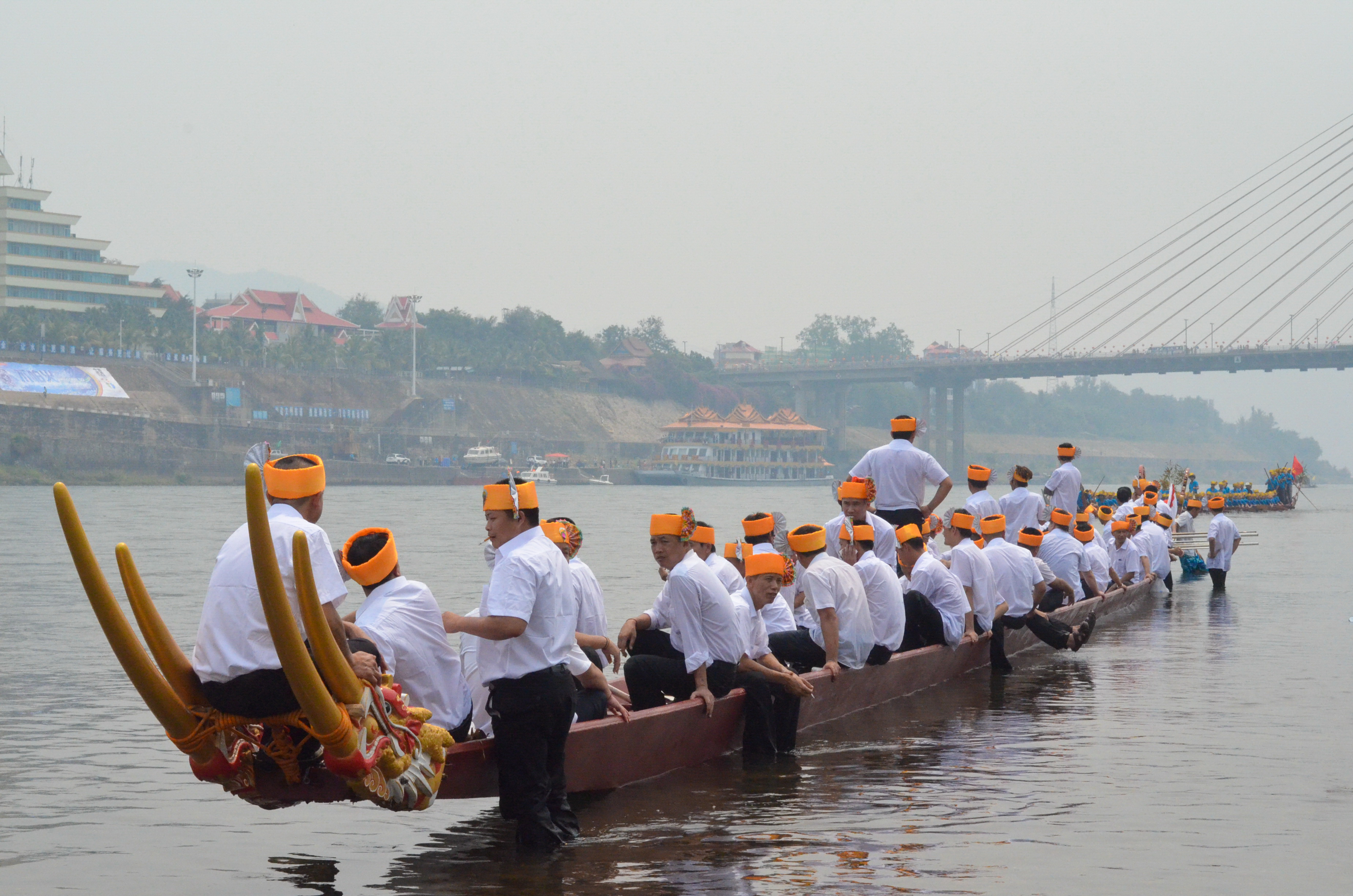
Dragon boat race

== Folktale ==
One folktale related to the Water Splashing Festival is a story about a demon king who took seven wives. One day, his seventh wife discovered his secret; if a strand of his hair was taken, it could be used to cut off his head. So she did so, and his head rolled to the ground and caught fire. There was disaster wherever it rolled. To prevent disaster from spreading, the wives decided to take turns holding the head and splashed water on each other to wash away the Demon King's blood stains. The Dai in Xishuangbanna and Dehong retell the story of the death of the Demon King and commemorate the seven women during the Water Splashing Festival.

== Dates in Dai calendar ==
Gregorian	Date	Animal	Day of the week	Gregorian	Date	Animal	Day of the week
2001	13 April	Snake	Friday	2026	13 April	Horse	Tuesday
2002	13 April	Horse	Saturday	2027	13 April	Goat	Thursday
2003	13 April	Goat	Sunday	2028	13 April	Monkey	Saturday
2004	13 April	Monkey	Tuesday	2029	13 April	Rooster	Sunday
2005	13 April	Rooster	Wednesday	2030	13 April	Dog	Monday
2006	13 April	Dog	Thursday	2031	13 April	Elephant	Tuesday
2007	13 April	Elephant	Friday	2032	13 April	Rat	Thursday
2008	13 April	Rat	Sunday	2033	13 April	Ox	Friday
2009	13 April	Ox	Monday	2034	13 April	Tiger	Saturday
2010	13 April	Tiger	Tuesday	2035	13 April	Rabbit	Sunday
2011	13 April	Rabbit	Wednesday	2036	13 April	Dragon	Tuesday
2012	13 April	Dragon	Friday	2037	13 April	Snake	Wednesday
2013	13 April	Snake	Saturday	2038	13 April	Horse	Thursday
2014	13 April	Horse	Sunday	2039	13 April	Goat	Friday
2015	13 April	Goat	Monday	2040	13 April	Monkey	Sunday
2016	13 April	Monkey	Wednesday	2041	13 April	Rooster	Monday
2017	13 April	Rooster	Thursday	2042	13 April	Dog	Tuesday
2018	13 April	Dog	Friday	2043	13 April	Elephant	Wednesday
2019	13 April	Elephant	Saturday	2044	13 April	Rat	Friday
2020	13 April	Rat	Monday	2045	13 April	Ox	Saturday
2021	13 April	Ox	Tuesday	2046	13 April	Tiger	Sunday
2022	13 April	Tiger	Thursday	2047	13 April	Rabbit	Monday
2023	13 April	Rabbit	Friday	2048	13 April	Dragon	Wednesday
2024	13 April	Dragon	Sunday	2049	13 April	Snake	Thursday
2025	13 April	Snake	Monday	2050	13 April	Horse	Friday

== See also ==
- List of festivals in China
- Songkran
- Water Festival
- List of Buddhist festivals
