= Sangrain =

New Year festival of Marma and Rakhine in Bangladesh

သကြံန် Sangrain
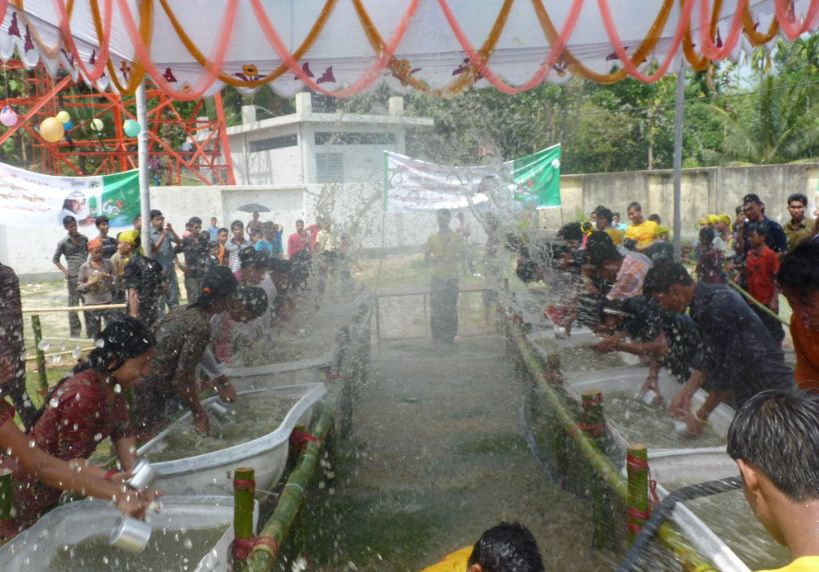
- water festival of 'Sangrai'
- Official name: Sangrai Festival
- Also called: Sangrai
- Observed by: Marma and Rakhine people in Bangladesh
- Liturgical color: Green
- Type: Cultural, ethnic & Buddhist
- Begins: 12 April
- Ends: 15/16 April
- Date: 14 April (Main Sangrai)
- Duration: 4/5 Days
- Frequency: Annual
- First time: 1359; 667 years ago
- Related to: South and Southeast Asian solar New Year

Sangrain, also known as Sangrai, is the New Year celebration of the Marma and Rakhine ethnic group, which is celebrated from April 13 to 15 every year. It is celebrated according to the Burmese calendar. Sangrai is observed in a total of three days, including the last two days of the old year and the first day of the new year. According to the Burmese calendar, these three days fell in the middle of April of the English calendar, but now they are observed on April 13, 14 and 15 in line with the English calendar. The traditional games are also held on the morning of the 13th with Pangchowai (Flower Sangrai), the main Sangrai on the 14th and the water on the 15th.

== Celebration ==
Absolutely one night of "Paanchowai" is used for worshiping Buddha and decorating houses. Although there are many flowers in the mountains, certain flowers are used to decorate the houses. The most popular of these is the cloud-colored flower called "Sangrai Paing". Everyone mainly decorates their houses on the day after "Paanchhoai" with this flower as the main thing.

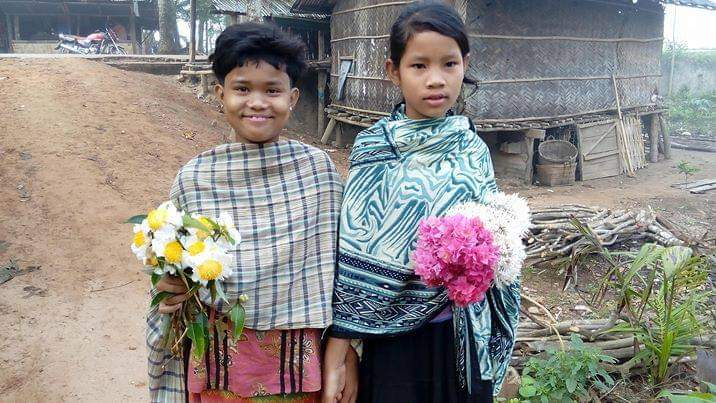
Marma child with flowers

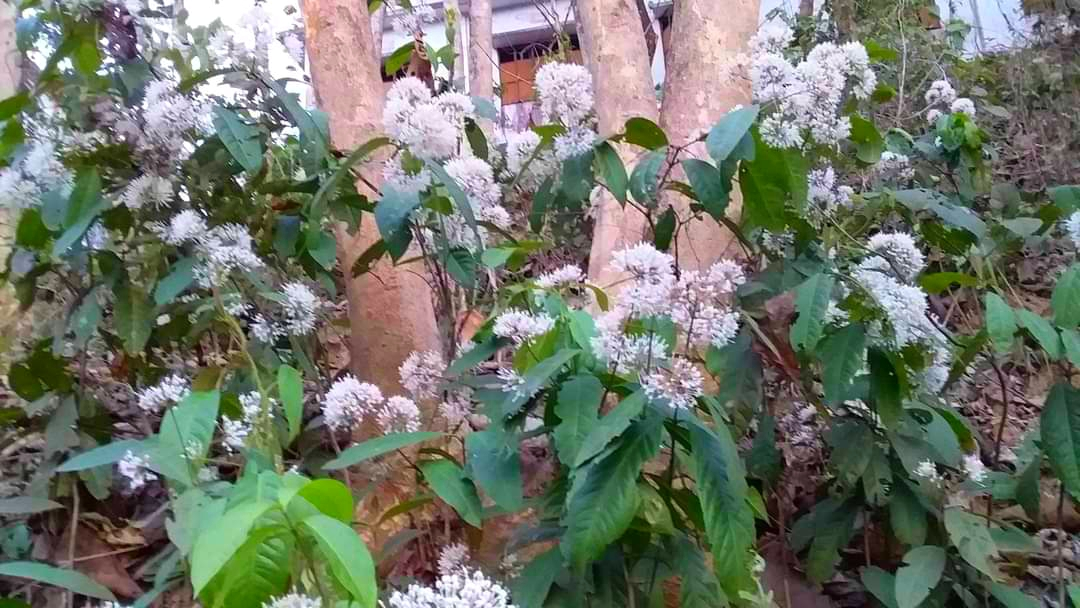
Mountain Sangrai Pang flowers

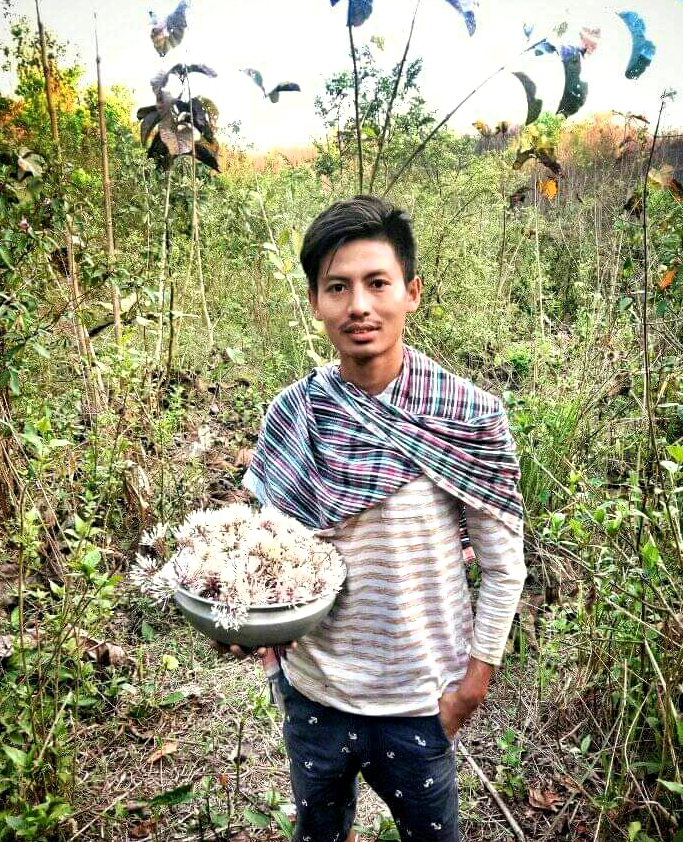
Marma youth with Sangrai pang flowers

=== Pangchowai (Flower Sangrai) ===
The work of plucking this flower is mainly done by the Marma youth. On the night of 'Paanchowai', Marma youths organize various events around it. Many people stay up all night making special types of pastries which they call "Pitha", while others arrange various traditional games for the Marmas. Some even arrange traditional Marma dances and songs. Basically, Marma youths use various tactics to stay awake all night. Then, after the arrival of the last night, that is, before dawn, they went to the mountains in groups and picked up 'Sangrai Paing' and handed it over to their mother. Ginnis decorate the flowers with needle and thread in the morning. First, the Buddha is worshiped with flowers and every door of every house is decorated with them. With the flowers arranged on the door of the house, it can be understood that Sangrai i.e. the new year has started.

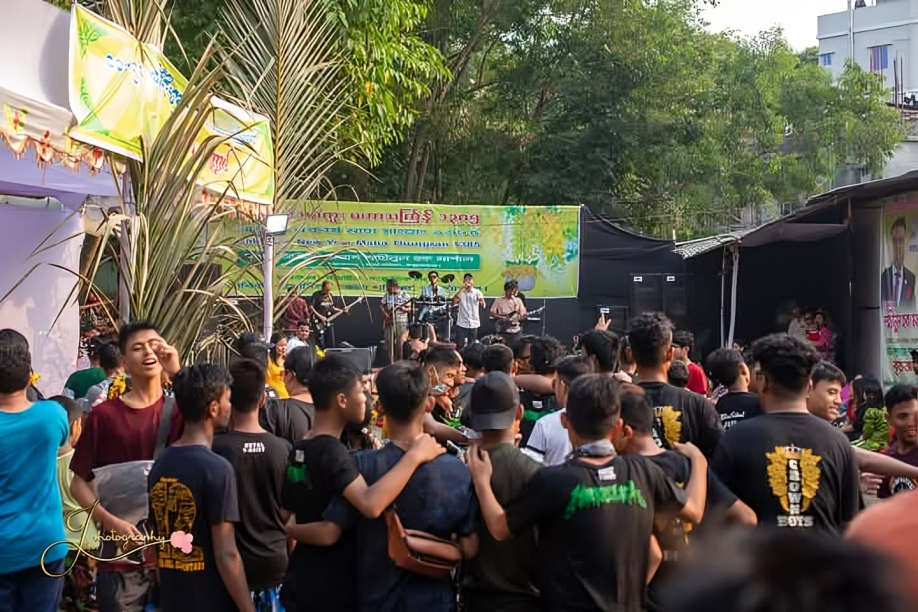
Water Festival in Cox Bazar

Not only young people but also young Marma boys and girls are interested in this 'Paanchhoai'. However, taking them to the mountains is very risky, as the elders always prevent the little boys and girls from going to the mountains for fear of the 'Frujuma' (Marma witch). There are even a lot of stories about this "Paanchhoai". The most popular of these is the story of 'Frujuma's Trap'. The Fruzuma witch, in the lure of 'Sangrai Paing', takes one of the children away to a deep forest that will never be released before daybreak. Because after falling into the trap, wherever he goes, he will find only jungle and jungle.

=== Water festival ===
The main attraction of Sangrai is the water sport called Marmara "Ri Long Poye". This water sports festival is held on the last day of Sangrai festival. Sangrai water sports are performed not only by the Marmas, but also by the Dai tribes of Southeast Asia, Myanmar, Thailand, Laos, Cambodia and China in mid-April. In Myanmar, such events are called "Thingyan" and in Thailand and Laos this ceremony is called "Sankran". "Sankran" in Thai means change. Sangrai actually means saying goodbye to the old year and welcoming the new year. At the same time, the new Jhum farming season in the Chittagong Hill Tracts begins after Sangrai. Not only Jhum farming, the Marmaras do not get married again after the Maghi full moon until Sangrai, which means that the Marmaras in Sangrai mean to start anew by throwing away all the old things, including the beginning of the new year. And so the Marmaras celebrate the New Year with a joyous ceremony in the hope of blessings and good wishes.

In this way, apart from playing water officially, everyone has a bottle of water in their hands on that day. He can sprinkle water on whomever he wants, no one objects to it but takes it as a symbol of blessings and good omens.

== See also ==
- Bizhu, Chakma New Year festival
- Madhu Purnima
- Songkran, Thai new year festival
- Thingyan, Burmese new Year festival
