= Cambodian New Year =

Traditional Cambodian holiday

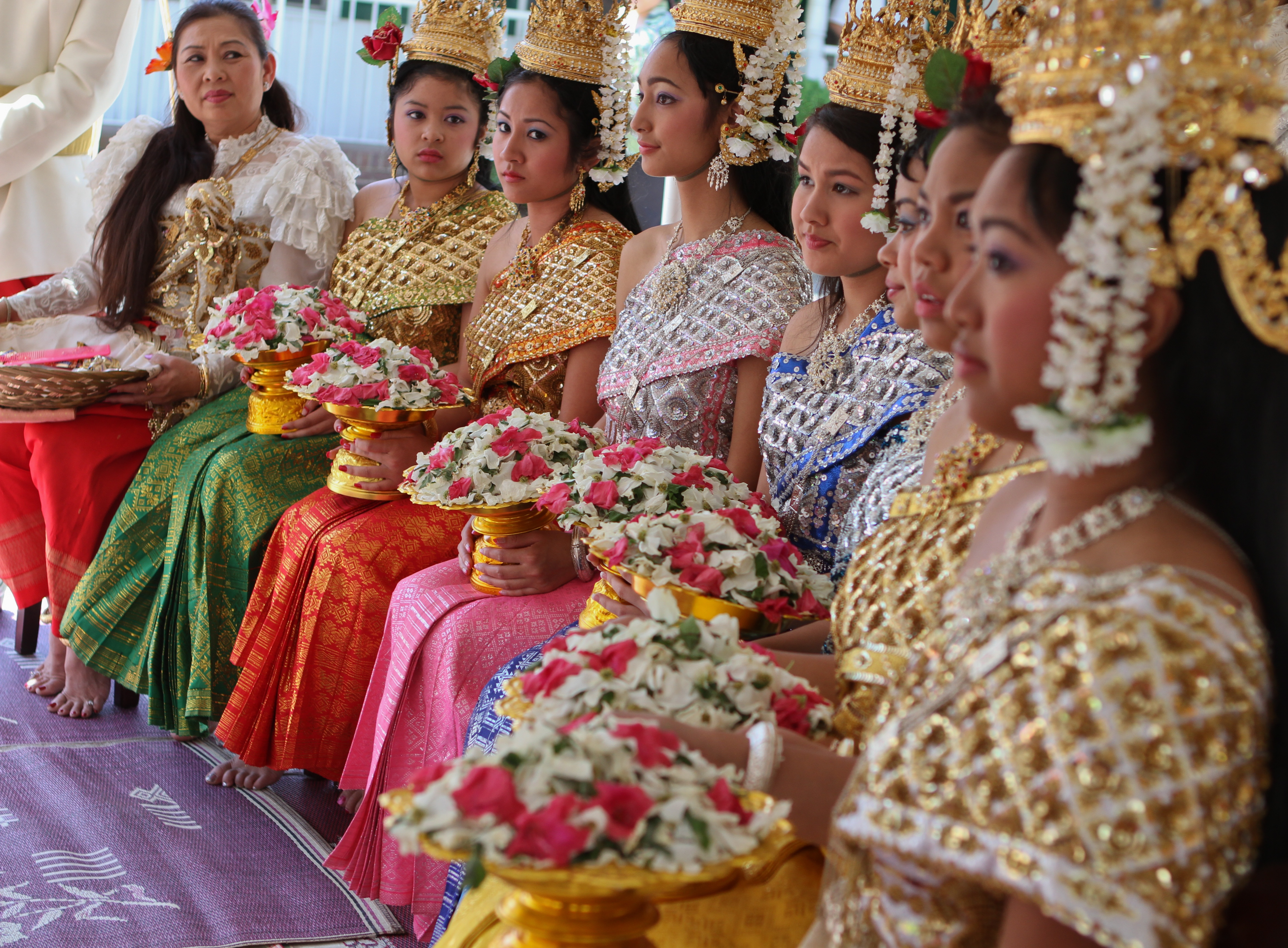
- Khmer women at a Cambodian New Year celebration in Lithonia, Georgia, U.S., 2010
- Official name: បុណ្យចូលឆ្នាំថ្មី ប្រពៃណីជាតិ (lit. 'New Year Festival, the National Tradition')
- Also called: Choul Chnam Thmey; Moha Sangkran, or Sangkran
- Observed by: Khmer people
- Significance: Marks the traditional solar new year in Cambodia
- Begins: 14 April
- Ends: 16 April
- Date: 14 April
- 2026 date: 14 April, Snake
- Duration: 3 days
- Frequency: annual
- Related to: South and Southeast Asian New Years

Cambodian New Year (or Khmer New Year; Khmer: បុណ្យចូលឆ្នាំខ្មែរ [ɓon coːl cʰnam kʰmae]), also known as Choul Chnam Thmey (Khmer: ចូលឆ្នាំថ្មី, UNGEGN: Chol Chhnăm Thmei, ALA-LC: Cūl Chnāṃ Thmī [coːl cʰnam tʰməj]; lit. 'Enter the New Year'), Moha Sangkran (Khmer: មហាសង្ក្រាន្ត, UNGEGN: Môha Sângkrant, ALA-LC: Mahā Sangkrānt [mɔhaː sɑŋkraːn]; lit. 'Great Sankranti') or Sangkran, is the traditional celebration of the solar new year in Cambodia. A three-day public holiday in the country, the observance begins on New Year's Day, which usually falls on 13 April or 14 April, which is the end of the harvesting season, when farmers enjoy the fruits of their labor before the rainy season begins. Khmers living abroad may choose to celebrate during a weekend rather than just specifically 13 April through 16 April. The Khmer New Year coincides with the traditional solar new year in several parts of India, Bangladesh, Nepal, Sri Lanka, Myanmar, Laos and Thailand.

== The three days of the new year ==
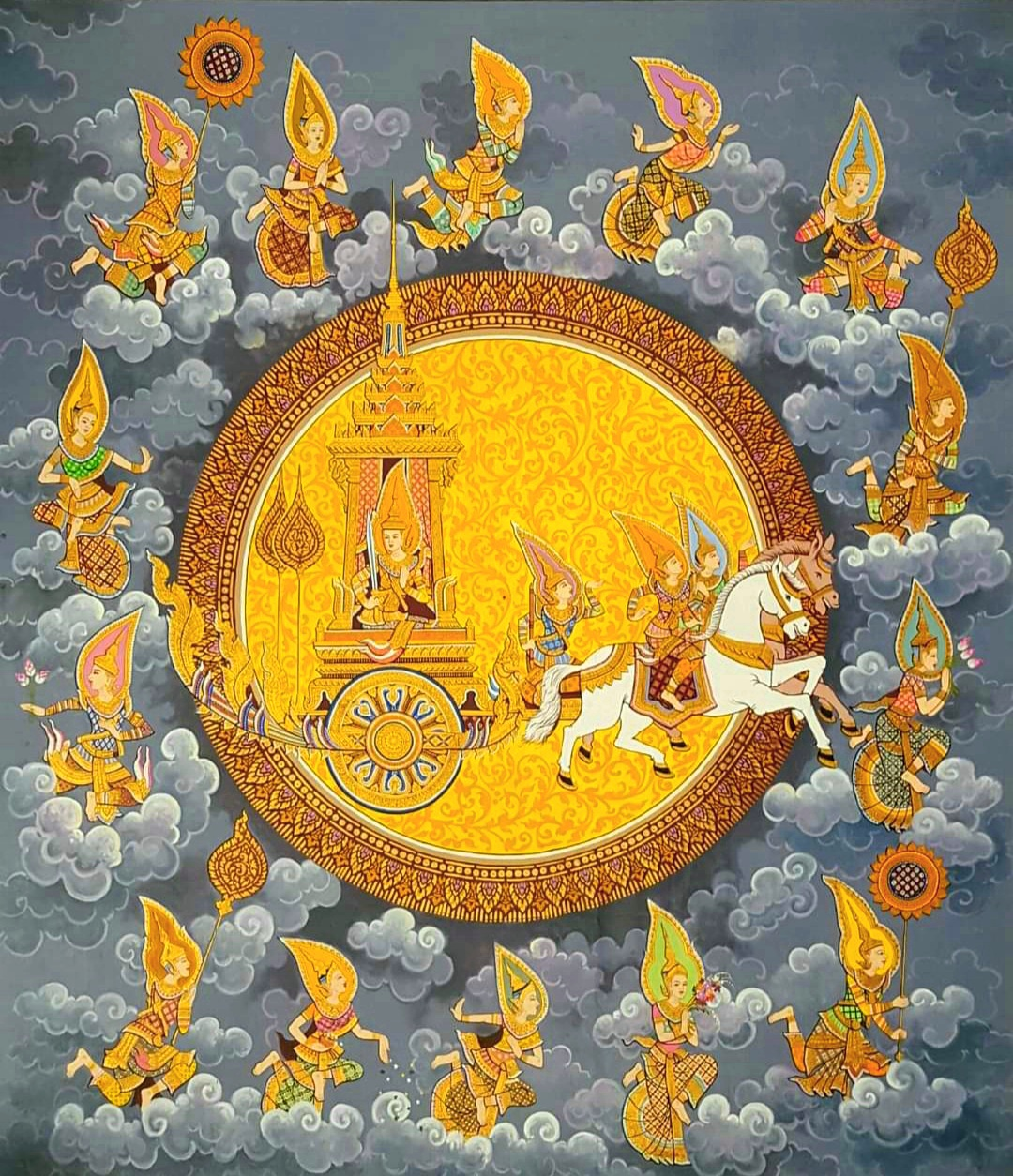
Preah Sorya's journey with his sun marking the Khmer New Year

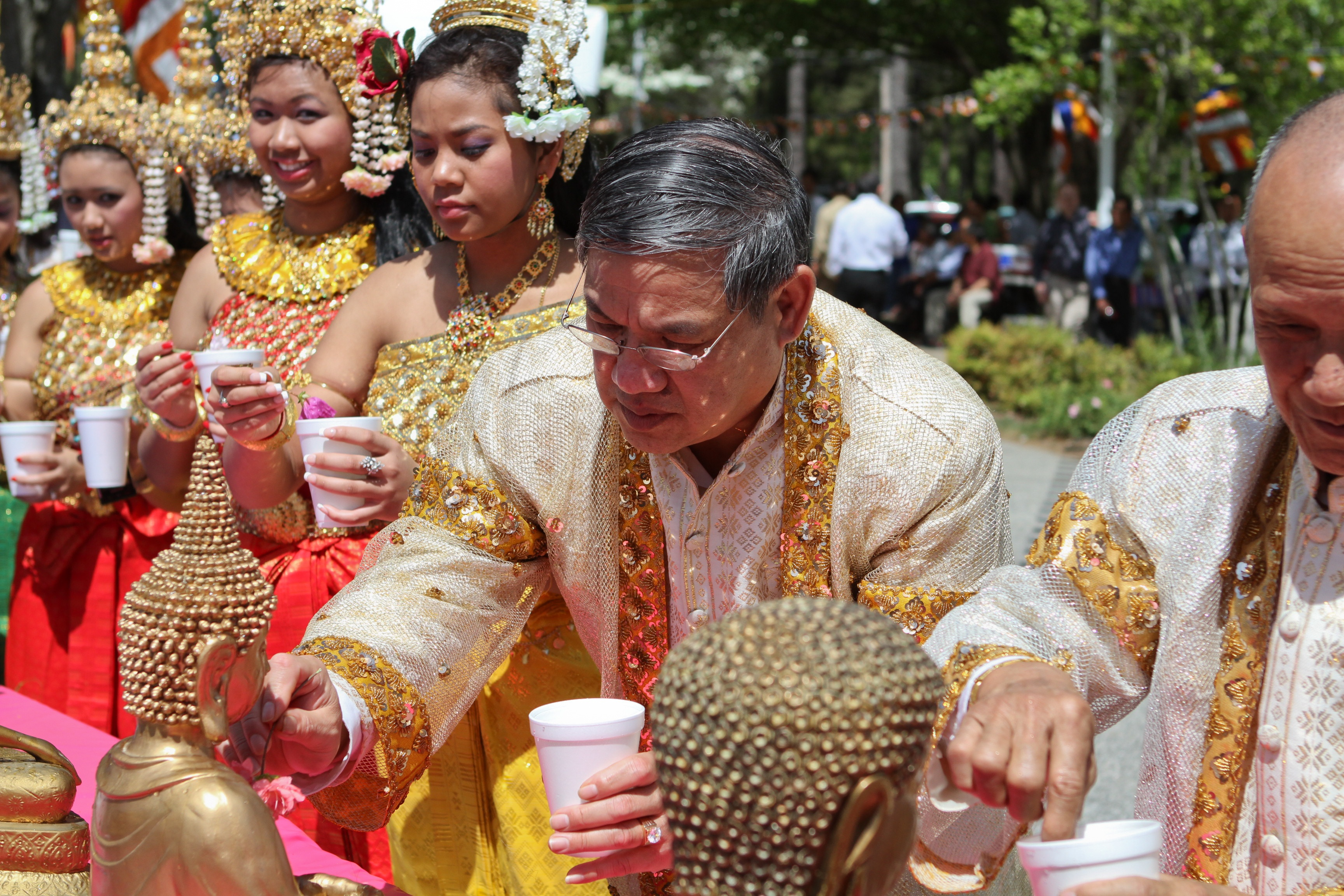
Elders cleanse statues of the Buddha with perfumed water.

=== Moha Sangkrant ===
Moha Sangkrant (Khmer: មហាសង្រ្កាន្ត, Môha Sângkrant), or Sangkrant, derived from Sanskrit saṅkrānti, is the name of the first day of the new year celebration. It is the end of the year and the beginning of a new one. People dress up and light candles and burn incense sticks at shrines, where the members of each family pay homage to offer thanks for the Buddha's teachings by bowing, kneeling and prostrating themselves three times in front of his image. For good luck people wash their faces with holy water in the morning, their chests at noon, and their feet in the evening before they go to bed.

=== Veareak Vanabat ===
Veareak Vanabat (Khmer: វារៈវ័នបត, Véareă Voănôbât) is the name of the second day of the new year celebration. People contribute charity to the less fortunate by helping the poor, servants, homeless, and low-income families. Families attend a dedication ceremony to their ancestors at monasteries.

=== Veareak Laeung Sak ===
Veareak Laeung Sak (វារៈឡើងស័ក, Véareăk Laeung Săk) in Khmer is the name of the third day of the new year celebration. Buddhists wash the Buddha statues and their elders with perfumed water. Bathing images of Buddha is a symbolic practice to wash bad actions away, like cleaning dirt from household items with water. It is also thought to be a kind deed that will bring longevity, good luck, happiness and prosperity in life. By washing their grandparents and parents, the children can obtain from them best wishes and good pieces of advice to live the life for the rest of the year.

== New Year's customs ==
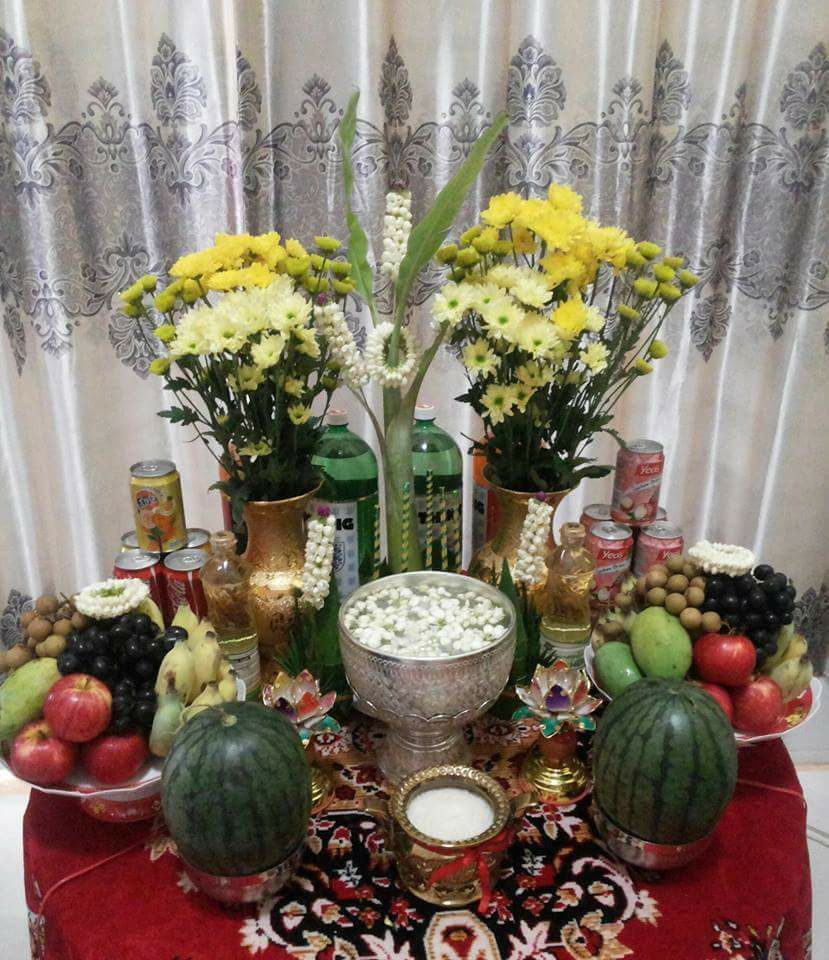
Tables with offerings of flowers and food to one's ancestors are commonly set up for the Khmer New Year.

In temples, people erect a sand hillock on temple grounds. They mound up a big pointed hill of sand or dome in the center which represents Valuka Chaitya, the stupa at Tavatimsa where the Buddha's hair and diadem are buried. The big stupa is surrounded by four small ones, which represent the stupas of the Buddha's favorite disciples: Sariputta, Moggallana, Ananda, and Maha Kassapa. There is another tradition called Srang Preah (ស្រង់ព្រះ, Sráng Preăh) : pouring water or liquid plaster (a mixture of water with some chalk powder) on elder relative, or people (mostly the younger generation is responsible for pouring the water).

The Khmer New Year is also a time to prepare special dishes. One of these is a kralan (ក្រឡាន, Krâlan), a cake made from steamed rice mixed with beans or peas, grated coconut and coconut milk. The mixture is stuffed inside a bamboo stick and slowly roasted.

== Traditional games ==
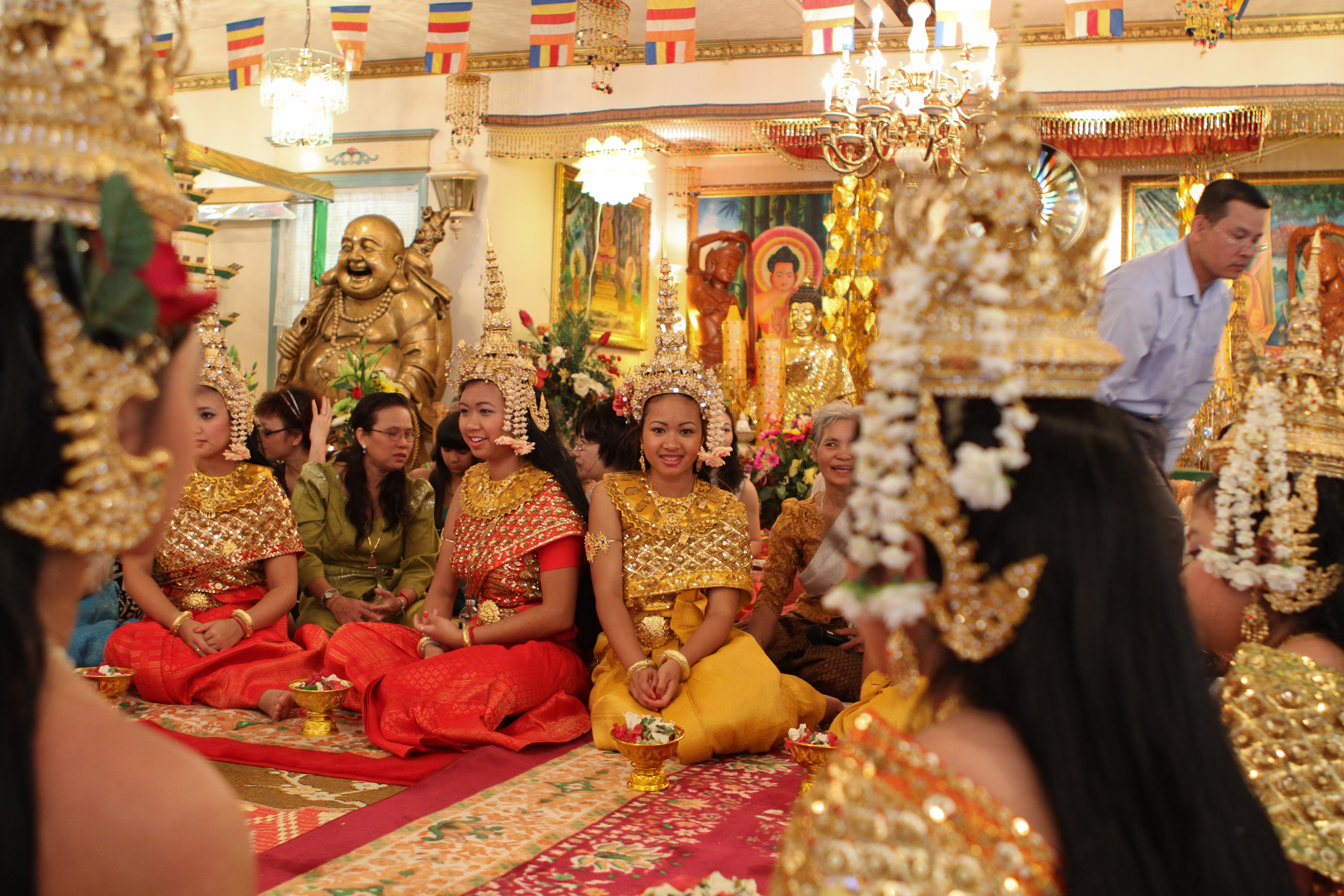
Khmer women dressed in traditional garments

Cambodia is home to a variety of traditional games (ល្បែង⁣ប្រជាប្រិយ, Lbêng Prâchéaprĕy) played to transform the dull days into memorable occasions. These games are similar to those played in Manipur, a north-eastern state in India. Throughout the Khmer New Year, street corners often are crowded with friends and families enjoying a break from routine, filling their free time with dancing and games. Typically, Khmer games help maintain one's mental and physical dexterity.

=== Chol Chhoung ===
Chol Chhoung (ចោល⁣ឈូង, Chaôl Chhung) is a game played especially on the first nightfall of the Khmer New Year by two groups of boys and girls. Ten or 20 people comprise each group, standing in two rows opposite each other. One group throws the chhoung to the other group. When it is caught, it will be rapidly thrown back to the first group. If someone is hit by the chhoung, the whole group must dance to get the chhoung back while the other group sings to the dance.

=== Chap Kon Kleng ===
Chap Kon Kleng (ចាប់⁣កូនខ្លែង, Chăp Kon Khlêng) is a game played by imitating a hen as she protects her chicks from a crow. Adults typically play this game on the night of the first New Year's Day. Participants usually appoint a strong player to play the hen who protects "her" chicks, while another person is picked to be the "crow". While both sides sing a song of bargaining, the crow tries to catch as many chicks as possible as they hide behind the hen.

=== Bos Angkunh ===
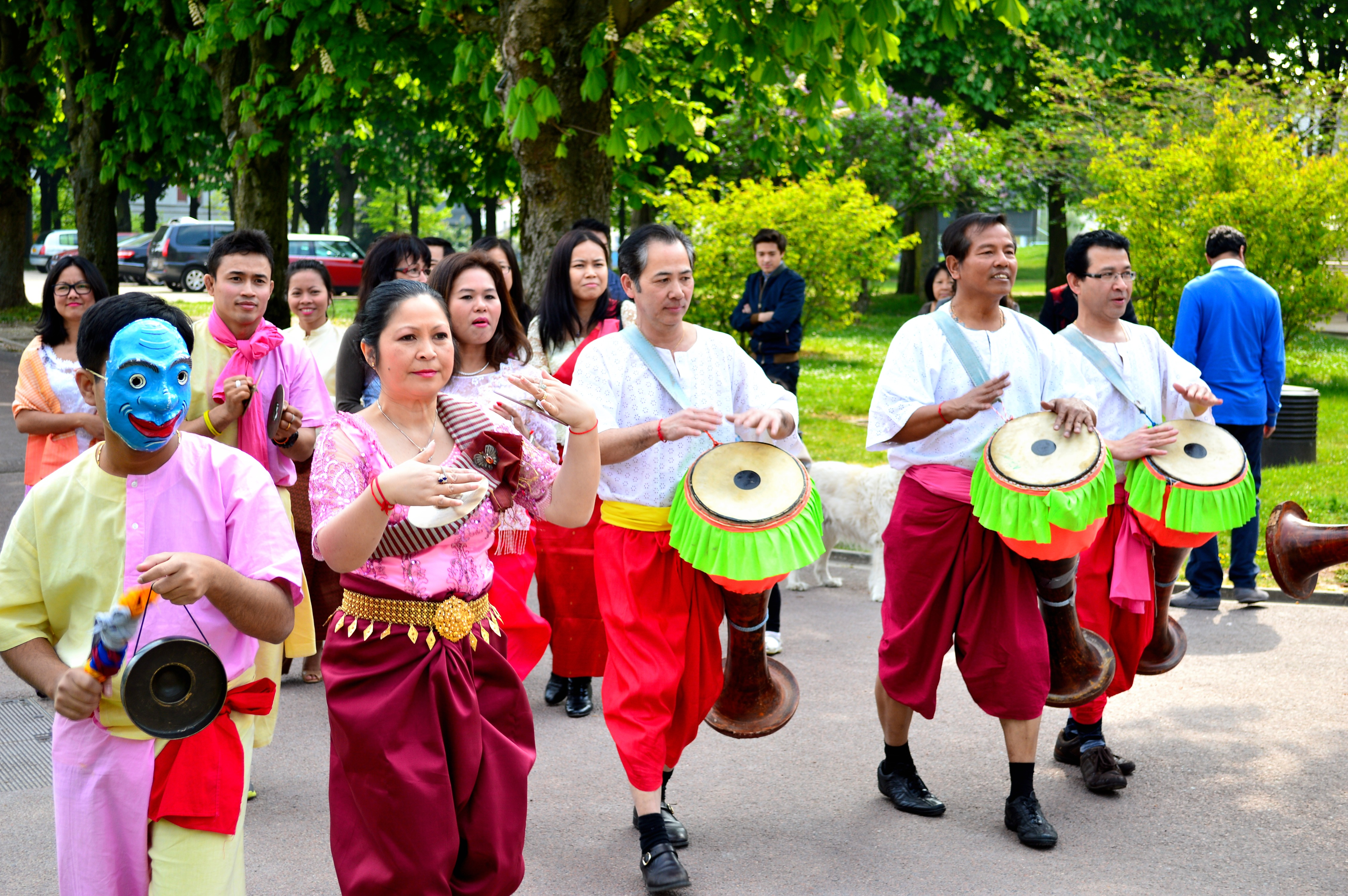
Khmer dancers and drummers

Bos Angkunh (បោះអង្គុញ⁣, Baôh Ángkŭnh) is the simple style consists of just throwing the Angkunhs to hit the target Angkunhs. The extended style adds five more stages in addition to the throwing stage. Both styles end with a penalty called Jours-activity that the winning team members get to perform on the losing team members. The Jours-activity is performed by using the Angkunghs the hit the knees of the losing team.

=== Leak Kanseng⁣ ===
Leak Kanseng (លាក់⁣កន្សែង, Leăk Kánsêng)⁣ is a game played by a group of children sitting in a circle. Someone holding a "kanseng" (Cambodian towel) that is twisted into a round shape walks around the circle while singing a song. The person walking secretly tries to place the "kanseng" behind one of the children. If that chosen child realizes what is happening, he or she must pick up the "kanseng" and beat the person sitting next to him or her.

=== Bay Khom ===
Bay Khom (បាយខុម, Bay Khŏm) is a game played by two children in rural or urban areas during their leisure time. Ten holes are dug in the shape of an oval into a board in the ground. The game is played with 42 small beads, stones or fruit seeds. Before starting the game, five beads are put into each of the two holes located at the tip of the board. Four beads are placed in each of the remaining eight holes. The first player takes all the beads from any hole and drops them one by one in the other holes. He or she must repeat this process until they have dropped the last bead into a hole that lies besides any empty one. Then they must take all the beads in the hole that follows the empty one. At this point, the second player may have his turn. The game ends when all the holes are empty. The player with the greatest number of beads wins the game. It is possibly similar to congkak.

=== Klah Klok ===
Klah Klok is a popular dice game from Cambodia. Players place bets on which pictures they think will appear on three dice with pictures on each side. The dice are then rolled into a bowl, and players win if one or more of their chosen pictures appear. There are six pictures to choose from and these are the stag (sometimes replaced with a tiger), gourd water bottle, rooster, fish, crab, and prawn. If more than one of their chosen pictures appears on the dice, their winnings are multiplied.

== Angkor Sangkrant ==
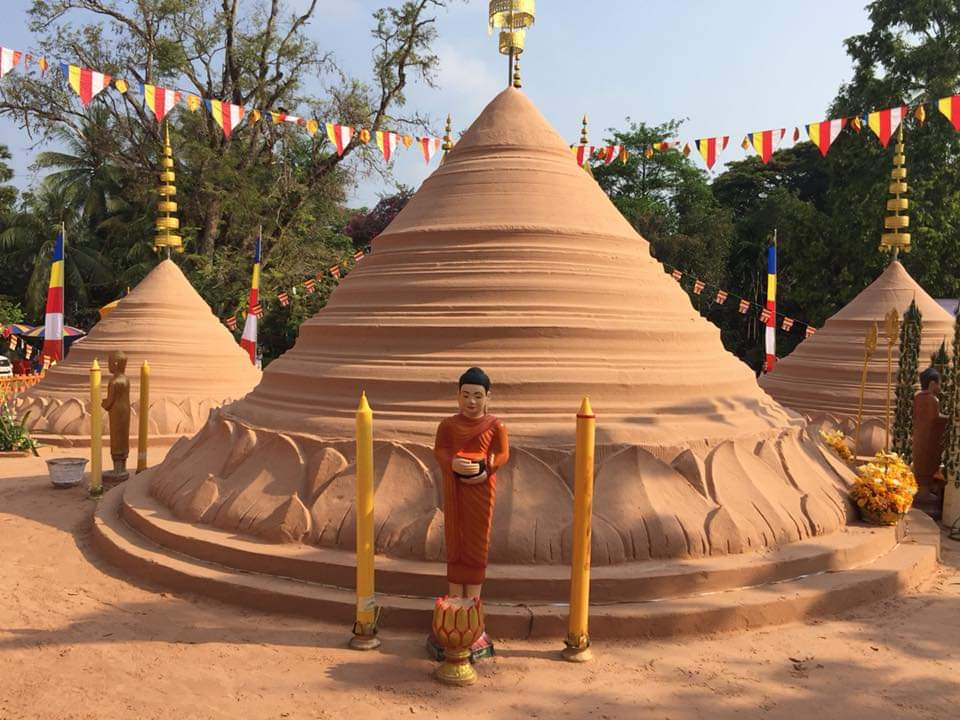
Khmer New Year Sand Hill ceremony

Angkor Sangkrant (អង្គរសង្ក្រាន្ត, Ángkô Sángkran) is a Khmer New Year event organized by the Union of Youth Federations of Cambodia (UYFC) in Siem Reap 14–16 April. The cultural event is an opportunity for all Cambodians to unite, and for foreign friends to receive unforgettable and exquisite experiences during Khmer New Year in Cambodia.

== Dates in the Khmer calendar ==
Gregorian	Date	Animal	Day of the week	Gregorian	Date	Animal	Day of the week
2001	13 April	Snake	Friday	2026	14 April	Horse	Tuesday
2002	13 April	Horse	Saturday	2027	14 April	Goat	Thursday
2003	13 April	Goat	Sunday	2028	13 April	Monkey	Saturday
2004	13 April	Monkey	Tuesday	2029	14 April	Rooster	Sunday
2005	13 April	Rooster	Wednesday	2030	14 April	Dog	Monday
2006	13 April	Dog	Thursday	2031	14 April	Pig	Tuesday
2007	13 April	Pig	Friday	2032	13 April	Rat	Thursday
2008	13 April	Rat	Sunday	2033	13 April	Ox	Friday
2009	13 April	Ox	Monday	2034	13 April	Tiger	Saturday
2010	13 April	Tiger	Tuesday	2035	13 April	Rabbit	Sunday
2011	13 April	Rabbit	Wednesday	2036	13 April	Dragon	Tuesday
2012	13 April	Dragon	Friday	2037	13 April	Snake	Wednesday
2013	13 April	Snake	Saturday	2038	13 April	Horse	Thursday
2014	13 April	Horse	Sunday	2039	13 April	Goat	Friday
2015	13 April	Goat	Monday	2040	13 April	Monkey	Sunday
2016	13 April	Monkey	Wednesday	2041	13 April	Rooster	Monday
2017	14 April	Rooster	Friday	2042	13 April	Dog	Tuesday
2018	14 April	Dog	Saturday	2043	13 April	Pig	Wednesday
2019	13 April	Pig	Sunday	2044	13 April	Rat	Friday
2020	13 April	Rat	Monday	2045	13 April	Ox	Saturday
2021	14 April	Ox	Tuesday	2046	13 April	Tiger	Sunday
2022	14 April	Tiger	Thursday	2047	13 April	Rabbit	Monday
2023	14 April	Rabbit	Friday	2048	13 April	Dragon	Wednesday
2024	13 April	Dragon	Saturday	2049	13 April	Snake	Thursday
2025	14 April	Snake	Monday	2050	13 April	Horse	Friday

== See also ==
- Water Festival
- Chinese zodiac
- South and Southeast Asian New Year
