= Lao New Year =

Holiday celebrated in mid-April

Lao New Year / Pi Mai Lao / ປີໃໝ່ລາວ
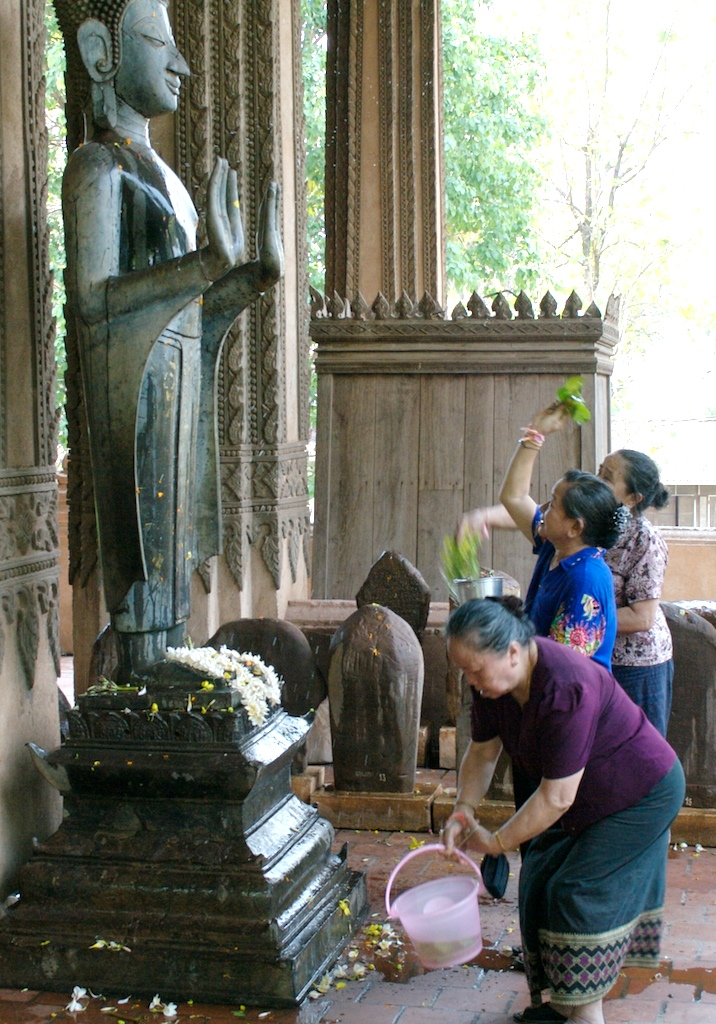
- Lao people bathing the Buddha during the New Year
- Official name: Pi Mai Lao (ປີໃໝ່ລາວ)
- Observed by: Lao, Laotians
- Significance: Marks the Lao new year
- Begins: Generally 13 or 14 April
- Ends: Generally 15 or 16 April
- Date: 14 April
- Frequency: Annual
- Related to: South and Southeast Asian New Year

Lao New Year, called Pi Mai Lao (Lao: ປີໃໝ່ລາວ, [pìː māj]) is celebrated every year from 13 or 14 April to 15 or 16 April.

== History ==
Lao New Year is a popular English name for a traditional celebration known in Laos as "Pi Mai" (in Lao language). Lao New Year is widely celebrated festival in Laos. The festival is also celebrated by the Lao in Australia, Canada, France, the UK and the US.

Lao New Year takes place in April, the hottest time of the year in Laos, which is also the start of the monsoon season. Lao New Year takes place at virtually the same time as the new year celebrations of many countries in South Asia such as Bangladesh, Cambodia, China (Dai People of Yunnan Province), India, Myanmar, Nepal, Thailand, and Sri Lanka.

== Festival dates ==
The official festival lasts for three days from 14 to 16 April, although celebrations can last more than a week in towns such as Luang Prabang. The first day is the last day of the old year. Houses and villages are properly cleaned on the first day. Perfume, water and flowers are also prepared for the Lao New Year. The second day of the festival is the "day of no year", a day that falls in neither the old year or the new year. The last day of the festival marks the start of the new year. In Laos, Lao New Year is a government holiday, with state offices closed during those three days.

== Traditions ==
=== Water ===
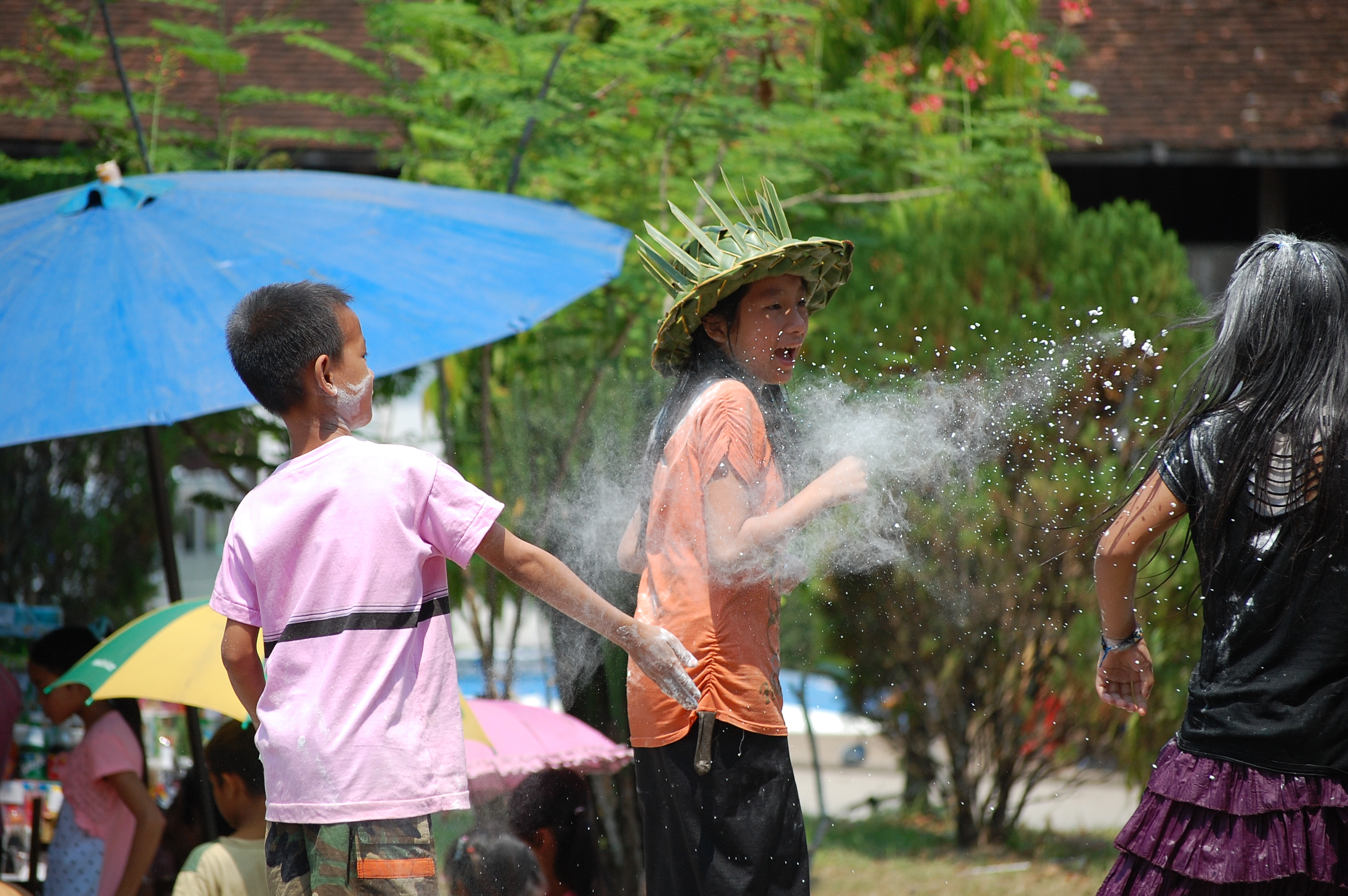
Pi Mai celebration, flour throwing

Water is used for washing homes, Buddha images, monks, and soaking friends and passers-by. Students first respectfully pour water on their elders, then monks for blessings of long life and peace, and last of all they splash water at each other. The water is perfumed with flowers or natural perfumes. Some people prefer flowers in the water to give a pleasing smell, as well as adding other things, like cologne and perfume. Over the years another tradition has developed with Lao New Year: people will smear or throw cream (shaving cream or whipped cream) or white powder on each other during the celebrations.

=== Sand ===
Sand is brought to the temple grounds and is made into stupas or mounds, then decorated before being given to the monks as a way of making merit. There are two ways to make the sand stupas. One way is to go to the beach, and the other way is to bring sand to the vat, or temple. Sand stupas are decorated with flags, flowers, white lines, and splashed with perfumed water. Sand stupas symbolize the mountain, Phoukhao Kailat, where King Kabinlaphrôm's head was kept by his seven daughters.

=== Animals ===
Another way to make merit at this time is to set animals free. The Lao believe that animals need to be free. The most commonly freed animals are tortoises, fish, crabs, birds, eels and other small animals.

=== Flowers ===
Flowers are gathered to decorate Buddha images. In the afternoons people collect fresh flowers. Senior monks take the younger monks to a garden filled with flowers, where they pick flowers and bring back to the wat to wash. People who didn't participate in the flower picking bring baskets to wash the flowers so the flowers can shine with the Buddha statues. In the evening lao people usually go to the temple to worship the Buddhas.

=== Beauty pageant ===
There is an annual beauty pageant in Luang Prabang to crown Miss Pi Mai Lao (Miss Lao New Year). There are many beauty pageants in Laos, but the old capital Luang Prabang is known for its Nangsangkhan pageant. There are seven contestants, each one symbolizing one of King Kabinlaphrôm's seven daughters.

=== Music and dance ===
During Lao New Year, there are many spectacles including traditional Lao music and social dancing, molam, and lamvông, which translates to 'circle dancing'. During the daytime many people go to the temple to worship, hoping to have a healthier and happier life in the new year. During the evening, people of all ages go to the temple for entertainment.

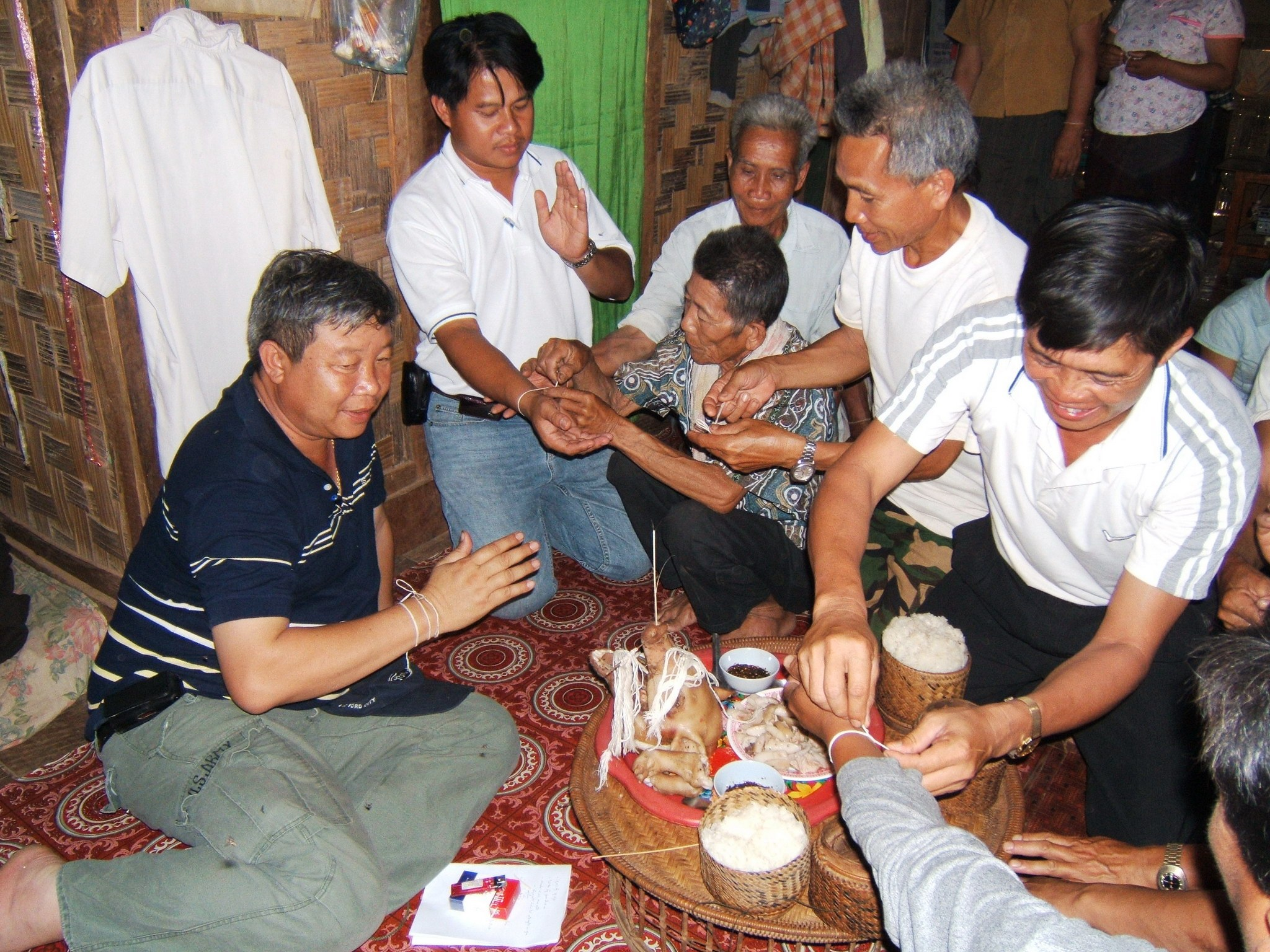
A greeting ceremony of Lao New Year in Ban Thasala muang Khamkeut, Bolikhamsai Province.

== Greetings ==
In greetings there are several ways to wish someone a happy Lao New Year. The most common expressions are sôk di pi mai, souksan van pi mai or sabaidi pi mai, which can be translated into English as "Happy New Year".

== See also ==
- List of Buddhist festivals
- South and Southeast Asian New Year
