= Indian New Year's days =

New Year's Days in India

There are numerous days throughout the year celebrated as New Year's Day in the different regions of the Republic of India. The observance is determined by whether the lunar, solar or lunisolar calendar is being followed. For those regions which follow the solar calendar, the new year falls as Chet in Punjab, Bohag Bihu in Assam, Puthandu in Tamil Nadu, Vishu in Kerala, Maha Bishuba Sankranti or Odia Nababarsa in Odisha, Poila Boishakh in Bengal and Jur Sital in the Mithila region of Bihar in the Vaishakha month of the calendar. Generally, this day falls during 14th or 15th of the month of April. Those following the lunar calendar consider the month of Chaitra (corresponding to March–April) as the first month of the year, so the new year is celebrated on the first day of this month like Ugadi in Andhra Pradesh, Telangana, Karnataka and Gudi Padwa in Maharashtra. Similarly, some regions in India consider the period between consecutive Sankarantis as one month and others take the period between consecutive Purnimas as a month. In Gujarat the new year is celebrated as the day after Diwali. As per the Hindu Calendar, it falls on Shukla Paksha Pratipada in the Hindu month of Kartik. As per the Indian Calendar based on the lunar cycle, Kartik is the first month of the year and the New Year in Gujarat falls on the first bright day of Kartik (Ekam). In other parts of India, New Year celebrations begin in the spring.

== Details ==
- Hindu religious festivals are based on Vikram Samvat. Not withstanding the Purnimanta scheme of months that is in use in North India which differs from amanta tradition by one fortnight (or Paksha), the New year in Vikram Samvat is based on amanta tradition and starts from the first day of Chaitra Shukla Paksha.
- In Gujarat, the fourth day of Diwali is celebrated as the first day of the Vikram Samvat calendar month of Kartik.
- Other festivals which are celebrated as new year in India are Baha parab (among Ho, Santal people and Munda) and Sarhul (in Jharkhand).

== Calendar view ==
Calendar	Date	Festival name	Region / Communities / Religions
Solar	1 Vaisakh (13/14 April)	Vaisakhi	Jammu, Punjab, Haryana, Chandigarh and parts of Delhi
Lunar	varies, Mar/Apr	Chaitra Navaratri (Hindu Lunar New Year)	Himachal Pradesh, Rajasthan (except Marwar region), Bihar (Bhojpur, Magadh), Uttar Pradesh (Awadh, Braj, Bagelkhand, Bhojpur-Purvanchal, Bundelkhand, Kannauj, Rohilkhand), Madhya Pradesh (Bagelkhand, Bundelkhand, Malwa, Mahakoshal, Gird), Chhattisgarh, Jharkhand, and parts of Delhi
Lunar	varies, Mar/Apr	Ugadi	Andhra Pradesh, Telangana, Karnataka, parts of Goa
Lunar	varies, Mar/Apr	Gudi Padwa	Maharashtra, Goa (Konkan)
Lunar	varies, Mar/Apr	Navreh	Kashmir
Lunar	varies, Jun/Jul	Ashadhi Bij	Kutch
Lunar	varies, Oct/Nov	Nutan Varsh	Gujarat and Rajasthan (Marwar region)
Lunar	varies, Mar/Apr	Cheti Chand	Sindh, Sindhi Hindus
Solar	fixed, 13/14/15 April	Mesha Sankranti (Hindu Solar New Year)	Uttarakhand (Garhwal and Kumaon), Nepalis (parts of Nepal, Sikkim and Darjeeling of West Bengal)
Solar	fixed, 13/14/15 April	Puthandu	Tamil Nadu
Solar	fixed, 13/14/15 April	Vishu (traditional)	Kerala
Solar	fixed, 17/18 August	1st Chingam (Kollam era calendar)	Kerala
Solar	fixed, 14/15 April	Bisu Parba	Tulu Nadu
Lunar	varies, Mar/Apr	Sajibu Cheiraoba	Manipur
Solar	fixed, 14/15 Apr	Buisu	Tripura Tribal Areas Autonomous District Council of Tripura
Solar	fixed, 13/14/15 Apr	Bwisagu	Bodoland Territorial Region of Assam
Solar	fixed, 13/14/15 April	Bohag Bihu	Brahmaputra Valley of Assam
Solar	fixed, 13/14 April	Maha Bishuba Sankranti	Odisha
Solar	fixed, 14/15 April	Pahela Baishakh	West Bengal, parts of Tripura and Barak Valley of Assam
Solar	fixed, 13/14/15 April	Jur Sital	Bihar (Mithila region)
Lunar	varies, Dec	Losoong/Namsoong	Sikkim (Bhutia, Lepcha)
Lunar	varies, Feb	Losar	Ladakh, Arunachal Pradesh (Monpa)
Lunar	varies, Oct/Nov	Mha Puja	Sikkim (Newar)
Lunar	varies, Feb/Mar	Gyalpo Lhosar	Sikkim (Sherpa)
Lunar	varies, Dec/Jan	Tamu Lhosar	Sikkim (Gurung)
Lunar	varies, Jan/Feb	Sonam Lhosar	Sikkim (Tamang)
Solar	fixed, 13/14 Apr	Sangken	Arunachal Pradesh (Khamti, Singpho, Khamyang, Tangsa), Assam (Tai Phake, Tai Aiton, Turung)
Solar	fixed, 13/14 Apr	Bizhu	Chakma Autonomous District Council of Mizoram, Tripura, Arunachal Pradesh (Chakma)
Solar	fixed, 13/14 Apr	Sangrai	Tripura (Mogh)
Solar	varies, 17, 18, 19 Aug	Pateti	Parsis
Solar	fixed, 21 March	Nowruz (Note: Mughal records state that Nowruz was celebrated in the northwestern Indian subcontinent, but inconsistently, with some Mughal emperors favoring its celebration while others not participating because it was not sanctioned by Sharia. Aurangzeb banned its celebration in 1659, calling it a "festival of fireworshippers" and its celebration a "stupid act".)	Iranis/other Zoroastrians

== See also ==
- Astronomical basis of the Hindu calendar
- Diwali in Gujarat
- Hindu units of time
- Hindu calendar
- Indian national calendar
- Lunar New Year
- Nyepi, new year in Balinese Hinduism
- South and Southeast Asian solar New Year
