= Sikkimese people =

People of Sikkim, India

- Flag of Sikkim (1967–1975)

Regions with significant populations
- India: 610,577
- Sikkim: 610,577 (2011)

Languages
- Nepali; Sikkimese; Lepcha; Gurung; Limbu; Magar; Sunuwar; Newari; Rai; Sherpa; Tamang

Religion
- Majority: Hinduism (57.76%) significant minority: Buddhism (27.39%); Minority: Christianity (9.91%); Traditional religion (Animism/Bon/Mun/Kiratism) (2.67%) Islam (1.26%); Sikhism (0.31%); Jainism (0.03%); No religion (0.3%)

Related ethnic groups
- Madhesi Nepalese, Nepalis including: Tibeto-Burman Sino-Tibetan and Indo-Aryan speaking people

Sikkimese are Indians who inhabit the North-east state of Sikkim. The dominant ethnic diversity of Sikkim is represented by 'Lho-Mon-Tsong-Tsum' that identifies origin of three ethnicities since the seventeenth century. The term 'Lho' refers to Bhutias (Lhopo) means south who migrated from Southern Tibet, the term 'Mon' refers to Lepchas (Rong) lived in lower Eastern Himalayas and the term 'Tsong' refers to Limbus, another tribe of Sikkim. The pre-theocratic phase of Sikkim was inhabited by the Kiratis, “Sikkim is also known as the home of the Kirati tribesmen from the pre-historic times. Society in Sikkim is characterised by multiple ethnicity and possesses attributes of a plural society. The present population of Sikkim is composed of different races and ethnic groups, viz., the Lepchas, the Bhutias, the Nepalis and the Plainsmen, who came and settled in different phases of history. The historic 8 May agreement between Chogyal, the Government of India and political parties of Sikkim defines Sikkimese as Sikkimese of Bhutia-Lepcha origin or Sikkimese of Nepali origin including Tsongs and Schedule castes. The community in Sikkim is inclusive of three sub-cultural sectors: the Kiratis, the Newaris and the Nepalis.

== Tribes and Communities of Sikkim ==
Sikkim is a multi-ethnic society inhabited by different ethnic communities belonging to different racial and linguistic groups. The Anthropological Survey of India has identified 21 communities in Sikkim and more than 13 different languages belonging to different linguistic stock are spoken in the state.

Communities and Tribes of Sikkim
1. Rai (13.4%)
2. Chhetri (12.2%)
3. Limbu (9.79%)
4. Bhutia (8.57%)
5. Lepcha (7.94%)
6. Bahun (6.96%)
7. Tamang (6.80%)
8. Gurung (5.87%)
9. Sherpa (4.45%)
10. Kami (4.25%)
11. Newar (3.73%)
12. Magar (2.69%)
13. Damai (1.96%)
14. Thami (0.90%)
15. Bhujel (0.60%)
16. Sunuwar (0.65%)
17. Sanyasi/Giri (0.46%)
18. Sarki (0.20%)
19. Yakkha Dewan (0.00%)
20. Others (9.34%)

=== Ethnic Communities ===
The People of India, Sikkim, Voi-XXXIX by K.S Singh (1993) enumerated altogether three ethnicities and further divided into twenty-five tribes and communities in Sikkim. Sikkimese are group of three ethnicities - Indian Gorkhas, Bhutia and Lepcha or Rongkup. While the Report of the Commission for Review of Environmental and Social Sector, Policies, Plans and Programmes (CRESP, 2008) records different communities and tribes of Sikkim such as Bhujel, Bhutia, Bahun (Khas), Chhetri (Khas), Yakkha, Damai, Gurung, Kami, Rai, Lepcha, Limbu, Magars, Newar, Jogi (Sanyasi/Giri), Sarki, Sherpa, Sunuwar, Tamang, and Thami. The Bhutias constitute 8.57%, Lepchas 7·94%, Limbus 9·79%, Tamangs 6.8%, Sherpas 4.45%, Magars 2.69%, Rais 13.4%, Gurungs 5.87%, Yakkhas 0.003%, Jogis (Sanyasi/Giri) 0.46%, Sunuwar 0.65%, Thamis 0.09%, Bhujels 0.6%, Khas or Bahun 6.96%, Khas or Chettris 12.22%, Pradhans (Newar) 3·73%, Kamis 4.25%, Damais 1.96%, Sarkis 0.2% and others 9·34% of the total population of Sikkim. The Rai is the single largest ethnic community in Sikkim followed by the Chettris. Among the Schedule caste, Kami is the largest community followed by Damai and Sarki. The community with lowest population in Sikkim is Yakkha followed by Thami.

=== Languages ===
Languages of Sikkim (2011 census)
1. Nepali (62.6%)
2. Sikkimese (6.86%)
3. Limbu (6.34%)
4. Lepcha (6.27%)
5. Hindi (5.58%)
6. Sherpa (2.24%)
7. Tamang (1.92%)
8. Bhojpuri (1.63%)
9. Rai (1.22%)
10. Bengali (1.14%)
11. Other (4.20%)

The official languages of the state are Nepali, Bhutia, Lepcha and English. Additional official languages include Gurung, Limbu, Magar, Sunuwar, Newar, Rai, Sherpa and Tamang for the purpose of preservation of culture and tradition in the state.

Nepali is the lingua franca of Sikkim, while Sikkimese (Bhutia) and Lepcha are spoken in certain areas. English is also spoken and understood in most of Sikkim. Other languages include Dzongkha, Groma, Hindi, Majhi, Majhwar, Thulung, Tibetan, and Yakkha. Nepali is the lingua franca of Sikkim while Bhutia and Lepcha are spoken in certain areas.

== Festivals ==
Sikkim Has Various Ethnic Cultural Festivals of Indian Gorkhas, Bhutias and Lepchas. Hindu and Buddhist both celebrates Local Festivals : Dashain (Vijaya Dashami), Tihar (Dipawali), Losar, Saga Dawa, Chasok Tangnam, Sakewa, Tendong Lho Rumfaat, Losoong/Namsoong, Indra Jatra, Sonam Lhosar, Tamu Lhosar, Chasok Tangnam, Maghe Sankranti, Buddha Jayanti, Rama Navami, Pang-Lhabsol, Lhabab Duechen. Teyongsi Srijunga Sawan Tongnam, Barahimizong, Kagyed Dance, Guru Rimpoche's Thunkar Tshechu, Bhanu Jayanti etc.

== Religion ==
Vajrayana Buddhism, which accounts for 28.1 per cent of the population, is Sikkim's second-largest, yet most prominent religion. Prior to Sikkim's becoming a part of the Indian Union, Vajrayana Buddhism was the state religion under the Chogyal. Sikkim has 75 Buddhist monasteries, the oldest dating back to the 1700s.

Hinduism has been the state's major religion since the arrival of the Nepali speaking Indian Gorkha Hindu population; an estimated 64% per cent of the total population are now adherents of the religion. There exist many Hindu temples. Kirateshwar Mahadev Temple is very popular, the Char Dham, Sai Mandir altogether.

Christians in Sikkim are mostly descendants of Lepcha people who were converted by British missionaries in the late 19th century and constitute around 10 per cent of the population. As of 2014, the Evangelical Presbyterian Church of Sikkim is the largest Christian denomination in Sikkim.

Muslims (some of them are Tibetan Muslims) and Jains, who each account for roughly one per cent of the population.

The traditional religion of the native Lepcha people is Mun, an animist practice which co-exists alongside Buddhism.

== See also ==
- Sikkimese cuisine
- Indigenous peoples of Sikkim
- Rabdentse
- Gangtok
