= Gyalpo Losar =

New year festival of the Sherpa people

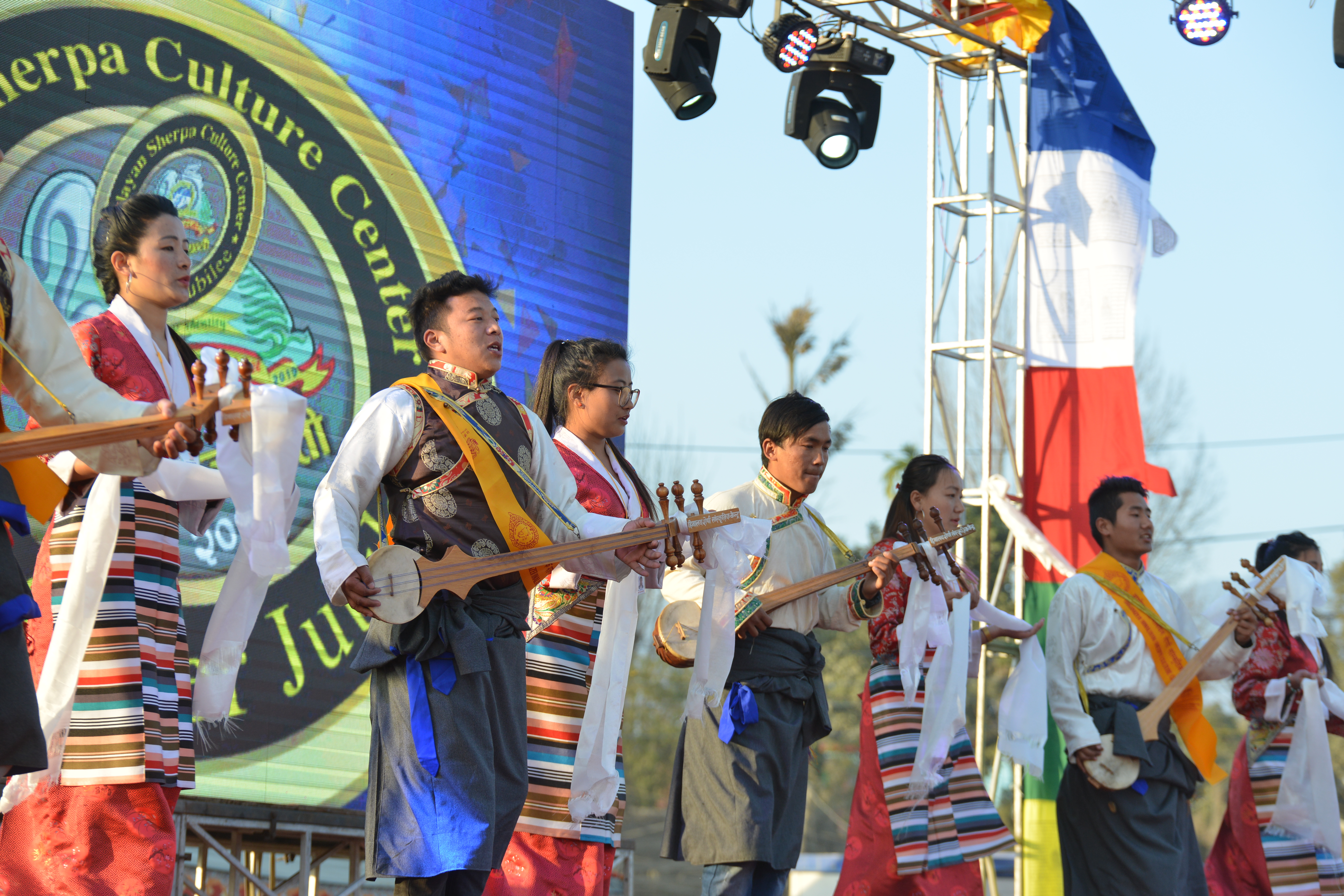
- Gyalpo Losar 2146 (2019 CE) celebration by Himalayan Sherpa Culture Center in Kathmandu, Nepal.
- Observed by: Sherpa Yolmo, and Bhotiya communities
- Type: Sherpa festival
- Significance: Marks the beginning of Tibetan New Year
- Observances: People gather together, sing different traditional songs, and perform traditional dances
- Date: Shukla Pratipada in the Nepali month of Phalguna
- Frequency: Annual
- Related to: Losar, Losoong

Gyalpo Losar (translation: King’s New Year) is the new year festival of the Sherpa people celebrated in Nepal and the Indian state of Sikkim along with the neighbouring Darjeeling and Kalimpong districts in West Bengal. The festival is celebrated on the first day of the Tibetan calendar, which corresponds to a date in February or March in the Gregorian calendar.

Gyalpo Losar is also regarded as the Tibetan New Year. The calendar has a cycle of 12 years named after the mouse, cow, tiger, rabbit, dragon, snake, horse, sheep, monkey, bird, dog and boar.

== Mythology ==
According to mythology, the Losar was first celebrated when an old woman named Belma introduced moon-based time measurement. People went to the local spring to perform rituals of gratitude and offerings were made to the Nagas (the snake god), or water spirits, who activated the water element in the area, and smoke offerings were made to the local spirits associated with the natural world.

== History ==
Gyalpo Losar, the Tibetan New Year, traces its origins to the pre-Buddhist Bon tradition of Tibet, where it was initially observed as a seasonal festival to honor the spirits of nature, mountain deities, and agricultural prosperity. It later became associated with the rise of Buddhism in Tibet.

Historical traditions suggest that the celebration of Losar as a spring New Year became prominent during the reign of Pude Gungyal, the ninth emperor of Tibet. During the early Tibetan Empire (7th–9th centuries), Gyalpo Losar evolved into an important royal and state festival, blending Bon rituals with Buddhist ceremonies introduced by rulers such as Songtsen Gampo.

As Tibetan culture spread across the Himalayan region, Gyalpo Losar became widely celebrated in Nepal, Bhutan, and northern India. Today, Sherpa, Tamang, Bhutia, and Tibetan communities celebrate the festival enthusiastically in places like Kathmandu, Pokhara, and the Everest region, where ancient traditions remain deeply rooted.

By the time of the Ming and Qing dynasties, Gyalpo Losar had spread beyond Tibet, influencing regions such as Nepal, Bhutan, and parts of India where Tibetan communities lived. Today, the festival is celebrated by the Sherpa, Tamang, Bhutia, and Tibetan communities in Nepal, particularly in Kathmandu, Pokhara, and the Everest region.

== Activities ==
Gyalpo Losar is celebrated for two weeks. The main celebrations take place during the first three days. On the first day, a traditional beverage called Changkol, an equivalent of Chhaang, is drunk. On the second day, which is the start of the new year, Gyalpo Losar is celebrated. On the third day, people gather together to have a feast.

Various traditional dances representing the struggle between demon and god are performed in the Monasteries. Mantras are chanted and holy torches are passed among all the people in the crowd. A traditional dance depicting a battle between a deer and the King is also performed.

Traditional dishes are served during the festival. One of the main dishes is a soup called Gutung cooked with nine kinds of beans and meat, wheat, rice, sweet potato, cheese, peas, green pepper, vermicelli noodles and radish. The soup is served with dumpling. Khapse, a deep-fried pastry commonly eaten during, symbolizing the start of holiday celebrations.

Firecrackers are fired to get rid of ill spirits. Traditional dances such as Syabru are performed.

== See also ==
- Sonam Losar, new year of Hyolmo people
- Tamu Losar, new year of Gurung people
- Losar, new year of Tibet people
