= Bhensan =

Bhensan is a town and headquarters of Bhensan Taluka in Junagadh district, Gujarat, India.

== History ==
According to legend, the town was a small nes or hamle. Some Rajputs of Rib or Ribra lost their buffaloe which they found there. They start living at this place and was named after Bhens, literally Buffalo in Gujarati.

The village was attacked and plundered by one Hamir Mehar in 1830s. In a Valabhi copper plate found at Timbdi near Bhensan mention is made of a village called Bhasant which possibly may be an ancient name of Bhensan.

Under British rule, it was the headquarters of a mahal, and a vahivatdar and a first class magistrate resided in town.

== Geography ==
It lies to the east of Junagadh on the bank of the Uben, which river rises in a rising ground called the Ubenio Timbo about three miles to the east of the village.

== Demographics ==
The population consists principally of Vanias, Brahmans, Lohanas, and Kanbis, and according to the census of 1872 consisted of 3029 souls, but this number fell to 1631 in 1881 after the famine of 1878–79.

== Economy ==
The cotton of the Bhensan Taluka is considered to be of good quality.

== Places of interest ==
Formerly a local ascetic named Devidas resided here who had such miraculous powers that to this day he is called Satya Devidas. His shrine is about two miles from Bhensan to the north-west. A fair is held here on the second of the light half of the month of Ashadh and the bava distributes a meal to the people assembled. It is said that lepers are cured by the sanctity of this place and hence many come to reside here.
