= Galdan Namchot =

Festival in Tibet, Nepal, Mongolia and Ladakh

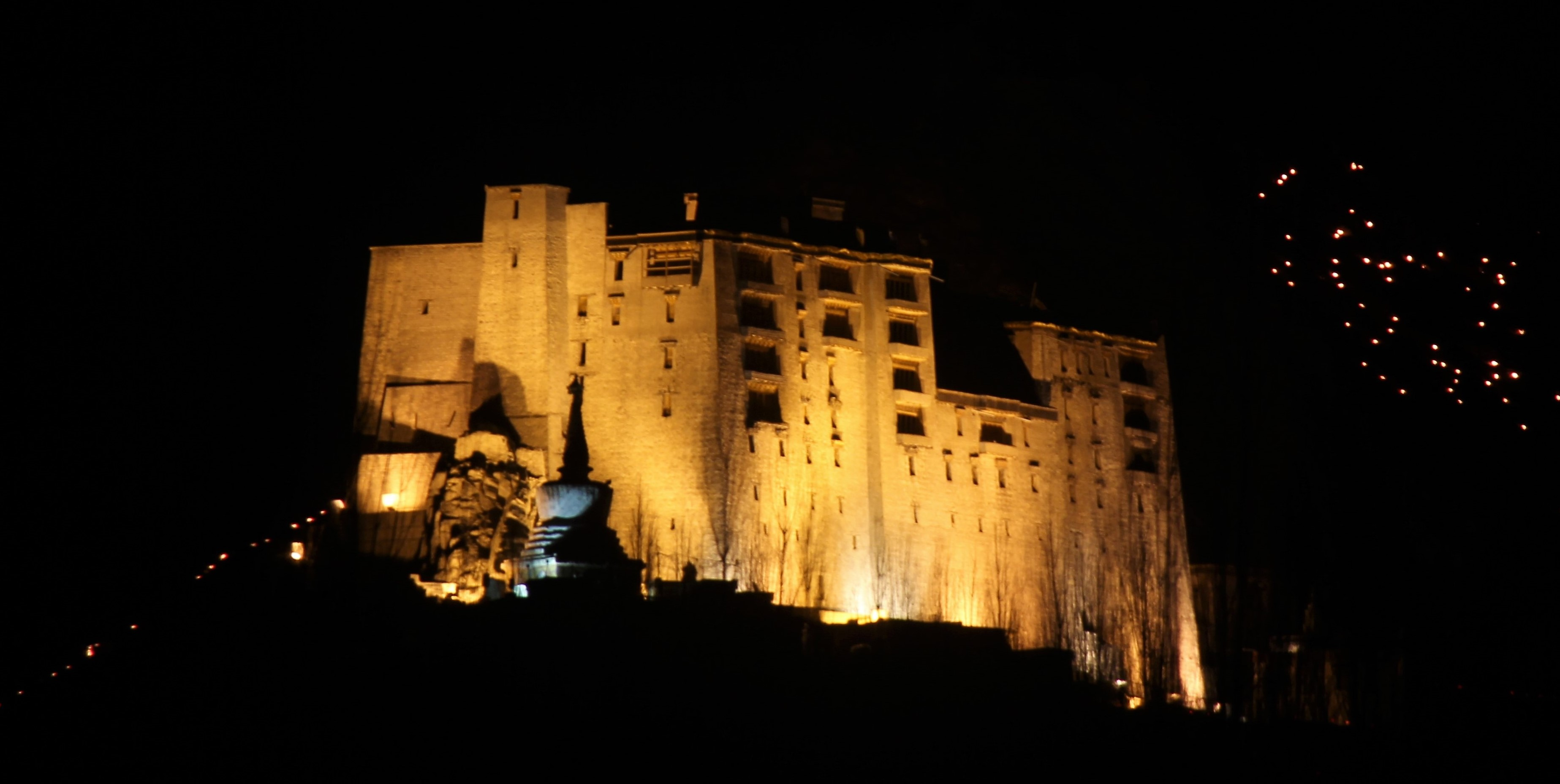
- Leh Palace lit in night on Galdan Namchot, 2016
- Observed by: Ladakhis Buddhists
- Type: Religious festival New year Commemoration
- Significance: Commemorate the birth and parinirvana (death) of Je Tsongkhapa and marking of beginning of Ladakhi new year
- Begins: December
- Ends: December
- Date: 25th day of the 10th month of the Tibetan lunar calendar.
- Frequency: Annual
- Related to: Losar, Losoong Festival

Galdan Namchot is a festival celebrated in Tibet, Nepal, Mongolia and many regions of Himalaya, particularly in Ladakh, India. It commemorates the birth and parinirvana (death) and the Buddhahood of Je Tsongkhapa (1357–1419 AD), a famous scholar/teacher of Tibetan Buddhism whose activities led to the formation of the Gelug school of Tibetan Buddhism. Galdan Namchot also marks the beginning of the new year celebrations in Ladakh.

== History ==
Je Tsongkhapa was born in the city of Tsongkha in Amdo, Tibet (present-day Haidong and Xining, Qinghai) in 1357. He was a famous teacher of Tibetan Buddhism whose activities led to the formation of the Gelug school of Tibetan Buddhism. On the twenty-fifth day of the tenth month of the Tibetan lunar calendar, Galdan Namchot is celebrated to commemorate the birthday and Buddhahood of Je Tsongkhapa. Galdan Namchot also marks the beginning of the new year (which falls after five days of the Galdan Namchot festival and continues till the Dosmoche festival in February).

Ladkahi's follow the Tibetan lunar calendar. Historically Losar, thereby Galdan Namchot were celebrated in the twelfth month in the Tibetan lunar calendar. Owing to a war in Skardu during reign of Raja Jamyang Namgyal (1595–1616 AD), Ladakh started celebrating Losar two months before in the tenth month of the Tibetan lunar calendar.

== Celebrations ==
As a part of the Galdan Namchot festival, monasteries, public and residential buildings are lit up. Butter lamps are also lit up, symbolizing the annihilation of darkness. Traditional dishes such as Thukpa, Momo and Butter tea are prepared and served in households. Khatak, a traditional ceremonial scarf is gifted by Ladakhi people.

== Schedule ==
Since Ladakh follows the Tibetan lunar calendar and Galdan Namchot festival comes on the twenty-fifth day of the tenth month Tibetan calendar, every year the festival falls on different dates of the Gregorian calendar.

| Year | Date |
|---|---|
| 2012 | 8 December |
| 2013 | 23 December |
| 2014 | 16 December |
| 2015 | 5 December |
| 2016 | 23 December |
| 2017 | 12 December |
| 2018 | 2 December |
| 2019 | 21 December |
| 2020 | 10 December |

== See also ==
- Losar
- Festivals in Ladakh
