= Mayfung =

New Year festival in Baltistan, Pakistan

Mayfung May Fung
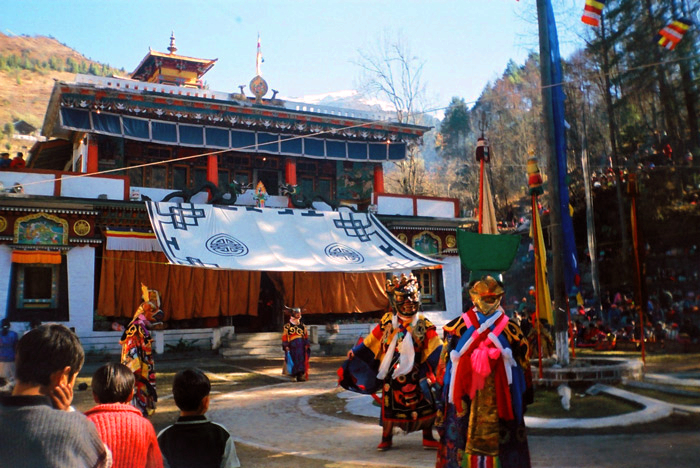
- Mayfung festival
- Observed by: Baltis
- Celebrations: Flying lanterns, dancing, singing, bonfire, fireworks
- Date: 21 December
- Frequency: Annually
- Related to: Losar

Mayfung (or May Fung and May Fang) is a New Year festival celebrated on 21 December by the Balti people in the Baltistan region of Pakistan. It is held to commemorate the end of the longest night of the year and the start of the Balti New Year (also called Losar; lit. 'New Year' in Balti). Mayfung is traditionally celebrated in Baltistan but also in some parts of Gilgit, Chitral and Tibet in China.

According to the people the celebration of this festival spares them from misfortunes. They believe that fire defends them against misfortunes and protects them from natural disasters.

Its origins can be traced back to the Bön religion, which was the dominant religion in the region prior to Buddhism and Islam. The festival is also believed to be related to Losar, the Tibetan New Year.

== Etymology ==
The word Mayfung is derived from two words in Balti language, "may" means fire and "fang" or "phang" means to throw or to play. So Mayfung literally translates to, to play with fire or to throw fireballs in the sky.

== Origin ==
According to legends, individuals can set evils on fire by igniting or creating a large fire. Some people think that the festival was first celebrated during the Maqpon dynasty, who came to power in the area in the 12th century and ruled for almost 700 years. Some individuals link the festival to Raja Abdal Khan, a brutal, man-eating Maqpon monarch of the 17th century.

== Practice ==
During this event, people set bonfire on mountains, plains, and house rooftops, especially young children and teenagers. Children frolic and dance while waving a bundle of flaming logs and singing traditional songs about the celebration. They scatter the residual fire in mountain slopes and ditches after lighting or Mayfung. Women make special delicacies. Fireworks, music, dancing, flying lanterns, and festival foods are all part of the celebration. Folk dances like the sword dance and fire dance are performed as the celebration comes to a close with a traditional musical performance. In an open ground or field where the fire is lighted, people dance and fly lanterns into the sky. The May Fung, according to popular belief, is required to keep the spirits and jinns away from people.

=== Kopolo ===
Kopolo is one of the oldest games in this region and is played during various events including Mayfung. The word Kopolo is derived from "koa", meaning leather and "polo" meaning ball in the Balti language, so Kopolo literally translates to "game of leather ball". During the Mayfung festival Kopolo game is organised at a regional level.

== See also ==
- Festivals in Pakistan
- Festivals in China
