= Balti people =

Ethnolinguistic group native to the Kashmir region of South Asia

Baltis
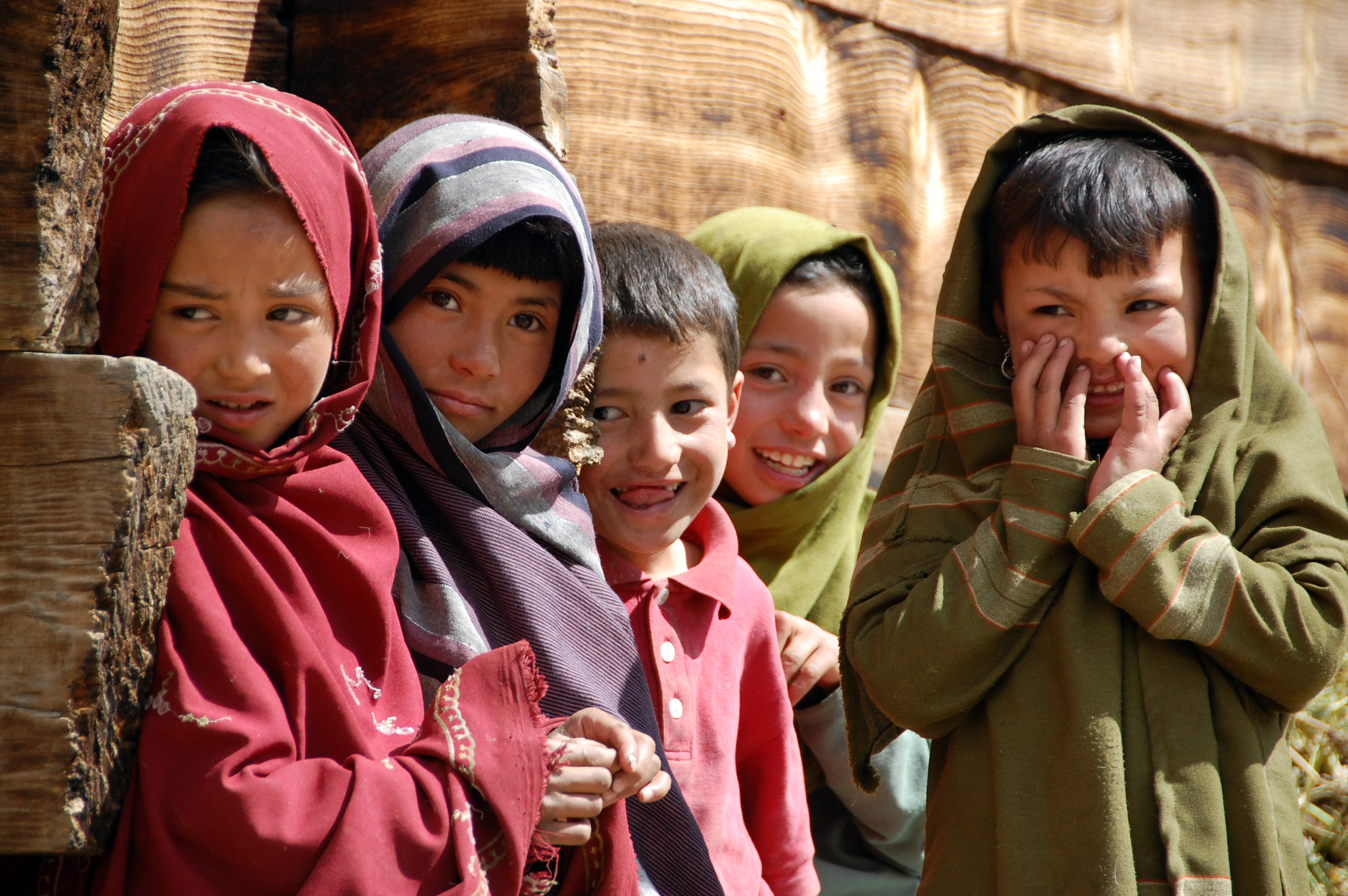
- Balti children photographed in Tarishing, Gilgit−Baltistan in September 2008

Total population
- c. 393,000

Regions with significant populations
- Gilgit-Baltistan, Pakistan; Ladakh, India

Languages
- L1: Balti (native language); L2: Urdu (national language of Pakistan)

Religion
- Islam (Predominantly Shia Muslims, with small minorities of Noorbakshia Muslims and Sunni Muslims in Pakistan and India)

Related ethnic groups
- Ladakhis and other Tibetic peoples

The Baltis are a Tibetic ethnic group who are native to the Pakistani-administered territory of Gilgit-Baltistan and the Indian-administered territory of Ladakh; in the latter, predominantly in the Kargil district with smaller concentrations present in the Leh district. Outside of the Kashmir region, Baltis are scattered throughout Pakistan, with the majority of the diaspora inhabiting prominent cities such as Lahore, Karachi, Islamabad and Rawalpindi.

== Origin ==
The origin of the name Balti is unknown. The first written mention of the Balti people occurs in the 2nd century BCE by the Alexandrian astronomer and geographer Ptolemy, who refers to the region as Byaltae. The Balti people themselves refer to their native land as Balti-yul (transl. 'Land of Baltis'); the modern name of the Baltistan region is the Persian rendering of this name.

== Language ==
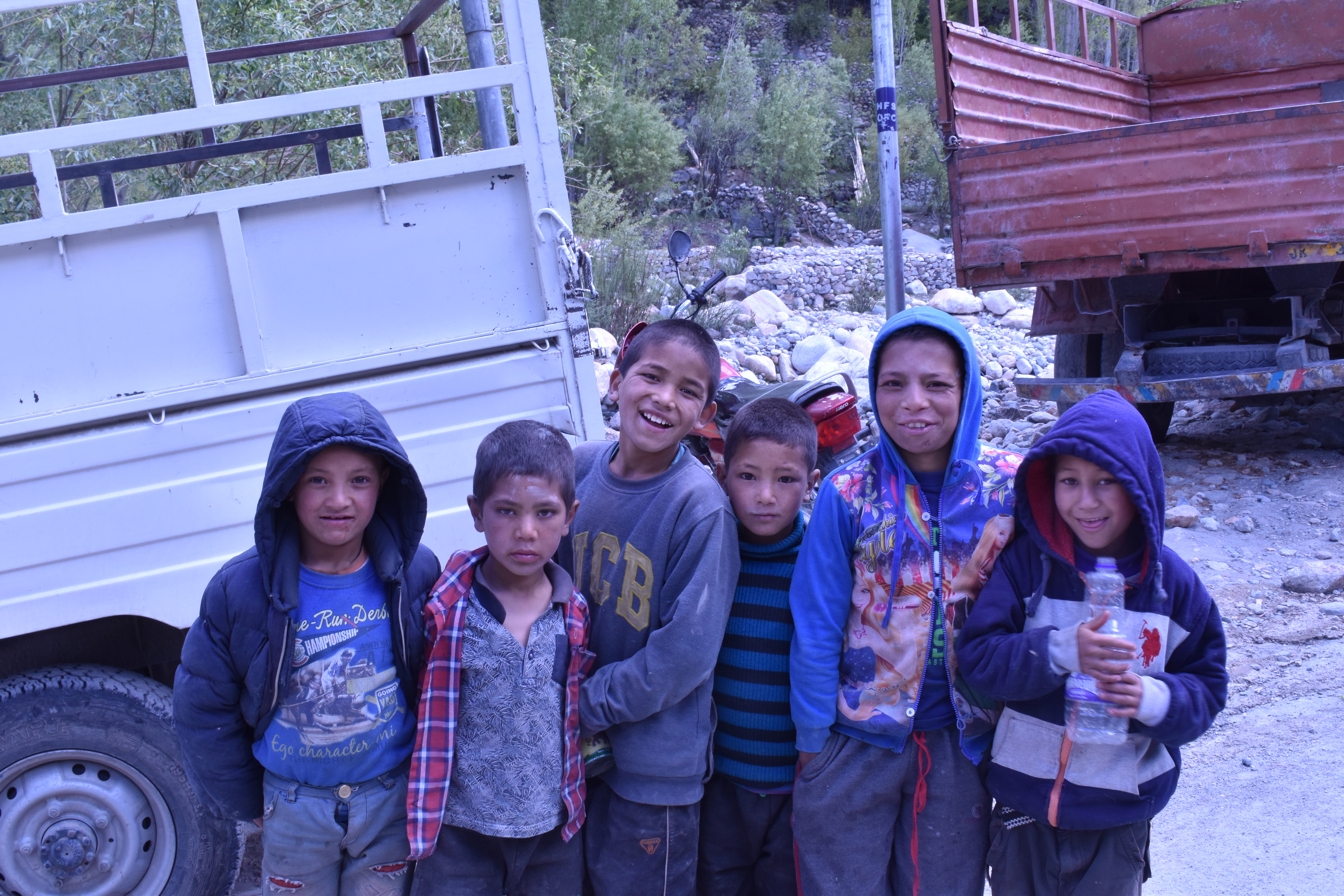
Balti children in Turtuk pose for a picture.

The Balti language belongs to the Tibetic language family. A.F.C.Read (1934) considers it to be a dialect of Ladakhi, while Nicolas Tournadre (2005) instead considers it to be a sister language of Ladakhi. The Balti language remains highly archaic and conservative, closer to Classical Tibetan than other Tibetan languages.

== Religion ==
The Baltis still retain many cultural traits of pre-Islamic Bön and Tibetan Buddhist rituals within their society, making them a unique demographic group in Pakistan.

Bön and Tibetan Buddhism were the dominant religions practiced by the Balti people until the arrival of Islam in Baltistan around the 14th century CE, predominantly through Sufi missionaries such as Mir Sayyid Ali Hamadani. The Noorbakshia Sufi sect further propagated the Islamic faith in the region, and most of the Balti had converted to Islam by the end of the 17th century. While Shia Islam had a presence in Baltistan since the late 16th century, Shia along with Sunni missionaries began actively proselytizing among the Balti around the 19th and early 20th centuries.

Around 60% of the Baltis are Shia Muslims, while some 30% practice Noorbakshia Sufi Islam, and 10% are Sunni Muslims.

== See also ==
- Mayfung
- Three Cups of Tea, a book about an American humanitarian involved in building schools in Baltistan (as part of a larger AfPak campaign)
- Tibetan Muslims, ethnoreligious group of Tibet
