= Asharh =

Third month of the Bengali calendar

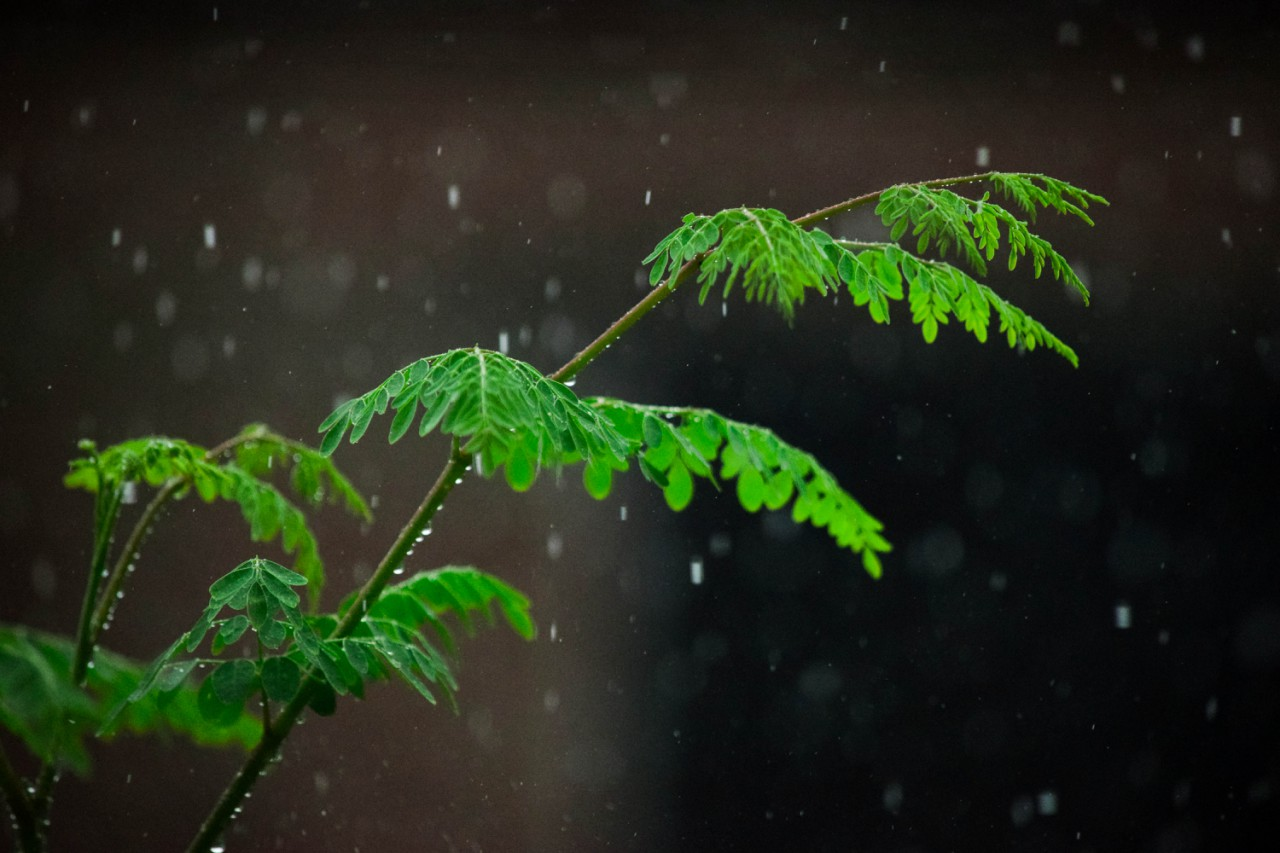
- The arrival of monsoon in the month of Asharh helps nature get refreshed after the scorching summer.
- Native name: আষাঢ় (Bengali)
- Calendar: Bengali calendar
- Month number: 3
- Number of days: 31 (Bangladesh); 31/32 (India)
- Season: Barsha (Monsoon)
- Gregorian equivalent: June–July

Asharh (Bengali: আষাঢ়, romanized: āshāḍh, Odia: ଆଷାଢ଼, romanized: āsāḍha) is the third month of the Bengali and Odia calendars and the Tirhuta Panchang (a Hindu calendar followed by the Maithil community in India and Nepal). It is the first of the two months that comprise the wet season, locally known as "Barsha" (Bengali: বর্ষা, romanized: Bôrsha, Nepali: वर्षा, romanized: Barsha, Odia: ବର୍ଷା, romanized: Barsā), when the monsoon winds blow. It is one of the first five months of the year that has 31 days, according to the Bangladeshi version of the Bengali Calendar. In the Indian version of the Bengali Calendar, the month can have up to 32 days.

== Etymology ==
It is named for the constellation Uttarashadha (Bengali: উত্তরাষাঢ়া, romanized: Uttôrashaŗha), identified with Sagittarius.

== Culture ==
=== Bengali culture ===
The month and the monsoon are welcomed with songs, dance, and celebration in Bangladesh. A popular poem "Abar Eshechhey Asharh" (আবার এসেছে আষাঢ়) by Rabindranath Tagore, is about this season.

=== Odia culture ===
There are occurrences of an extra Asadha which is referred to as mala masa (Odia: ମଳ ମାସ, romanized: maḷa māsa, lit. 'Unclean') in Odia, whereas the non-extra Asadha is referred to as suddha (Odia: ଶୁଦ୍ଧ, romanized: suddha).

== See also ==
- Equivalent month in Hindu calendar, Aashaadha
