= Khapse =

Tibetian deep-fried biscuit

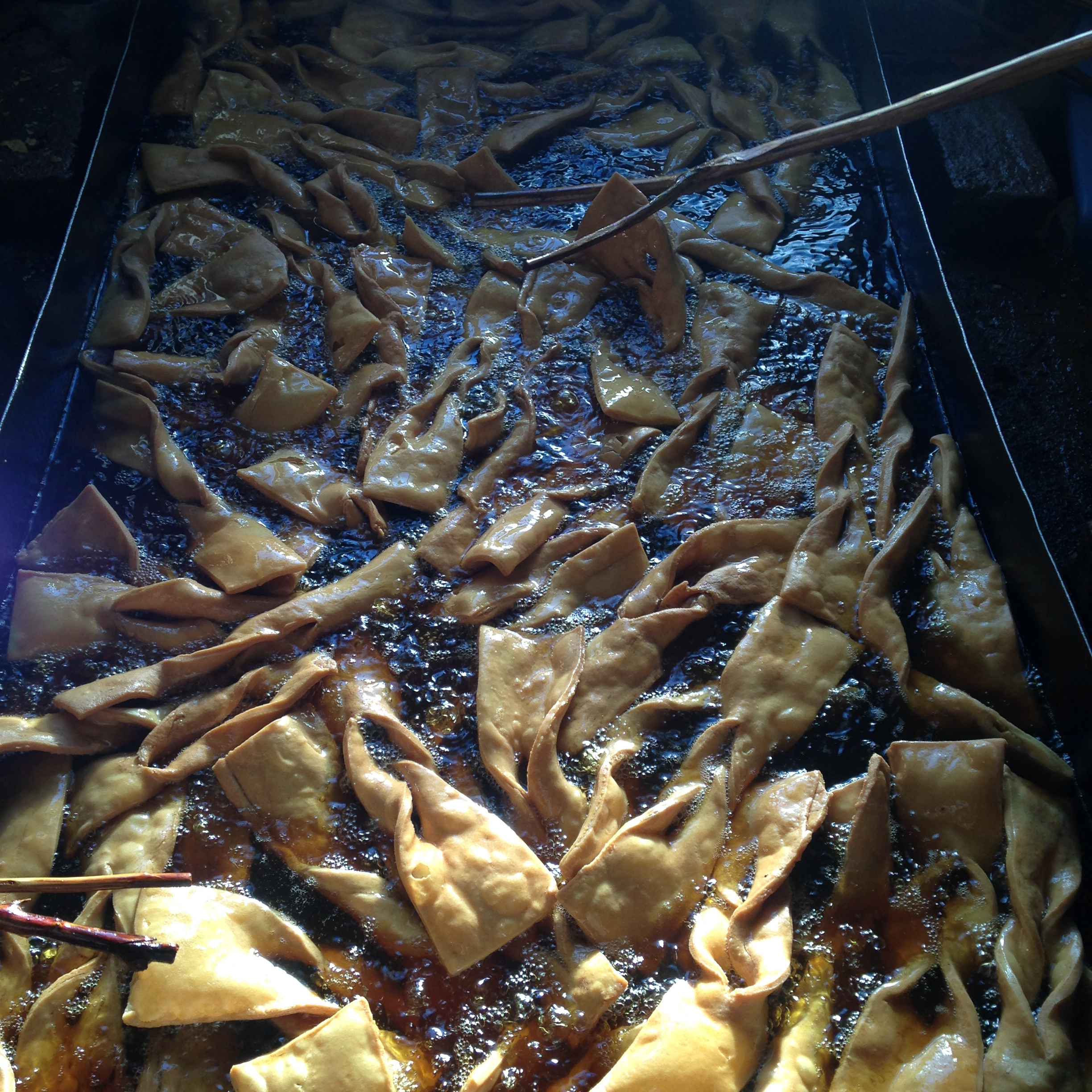
- Khapse in the making
- Alternative names: Zhero
- Type: Biscuit, Pastry
- Place of origin: Tibet
- Main ingredients: Flour, butter or oil, sugar

Khapse (from Tibetan: ཁ་ཟས་), Khapsey or colloquially known as amjok (from Tibetan ཨམ་བྱོག་ (Ear)) is a deep-fried Tibetan biscuit that is traditionally prepared during the Tibetan New Year or Losar. The dough for the khapse is usually made with flour, eggs, butter and sugar and is then shaped into different shapes and sizes. Some are sprinkled with powdered sugar, while other shapes, such as the donkey ear-shaped khapseys, are decorative.

== See also ==
- Klenät
- Maejap-gwa
- List of Tibetan dishes
