= Sal Mubarak =

Traditional Gujarati greeting for the New Year

Saal Mubarak is a New Year greeting derived from Indo-Persian and Arabic. Saal means “year” in Indo-Persian usage, while mubarak, of Arabic origin, means “blessed” or “auspicious.” The phrase therefore conveys the meaning “Blessed New Year.”

The greeting is used by the Parsi community in India and Pakistan in connection with Nowruz, the Zoroastrian New Year, which may fall in March or August depending on the calendar (Shahenshahi, Kadmi, or Fasli) observed.

Among Gujaratis, Both Saal Mubarak, and Nutan Varshabhinandan are used to mark the Gujarati New Year, also known as Bestu Varas ("beginning of the year"). This occasion is observed on Balipratipada, the day following Diwali, the festival of lights celebrated in Hinduism, Jainism, Sikhism, and Buddhism. In the Gujarati calendar, the New Year begins on Kartak Sud Ekam, the first day of the bright fortnight of the month of Kartak in the lunisolar calendar.

For many Gujaratis worldwide, the New Year serves as both a cultural and fiscal milestone. Celebrations typically continue from Diwali, with homes decorated using rangoli designs and garlands, oil lamps (diyas) lit, and fireworks displayed. It is customary to wear new clothes, visit elders to seek their blessings, and exchange sweet and monetary gifts while offering wishes for health and prosperity. Many devotees also visit temples to perform puja and offer prayers.

In the Jain tradition, the day following Diwali marks the beginning of the Vira Nirvana Samvat calendar, commemorating the nirvana (liberation) of Mahavira, the 24th Tirthankara, traditionally dated to 527 BCE. The date corresponds to the Jain New Year and is observed through temple visits, scriptural readings, meditation, charitable acts, and community gatherings. Historical accounts attribute the broader adoption of this New Year observance in Gujarat to the influence of the Jain scholar Hemachandra.
