= Jur Sital =

Maithil New Year in Bihar

Jur Sital Maithil New Year Aakhar Bochhor
- Observed by: Maithils
- Type: Festival
- Significance: Solar New Year
- Celebrations: Feasting, gifts
- Date: 14th/15th April
- Frequency: annual
- Related to: South and Southeast Asian solar New Year

Jur Sital (Maithili: जुड़ शीतल) or Maithil New Year (Maithili: मैथिल नव वर्ष) is the celebration of the first day of the Maithil new year also called Aakhar Bochhor. Maithils eat Bori with Bhaat (steamed rice) and sweets to observe the day. The day which usually falls on the 14th or 15 April on Gregorian calendar is celebrated by the Maithils of India and Nepal. This is also called Nirayana Mesh Sankranti and Tirhuta new year. The festive occasion is in keeping with the Tirhuta Panchang calendar used in the Mithila region.

== Origin and significance ==
The Maithili New Year follows the Nirayanam vernal equinox and falls on 14 April (may sometimes vary by a day) on the Gregorian year. 15 April marks the first day of the traditional Tirhuta Panchang.
Tropical vernal equinox fall around 22 March, and adding 23 degrees of trepidation or oscillation to it, we get the Hindu sidereal or Nirayana Mesha Sankranti (Sun's transition into Nirayana Aries).

Hence, the Maithili calendar begins on the same date, with Baishakh as first month of the year. It is also observed by most traditional calendars in India as in Tamil Nadu, Assam, Bengal, Kerala, Manipur, Orissa, Punjab, Tripura and also in Nepal.

== Tharu people ==
In the south eastern Terai of Nepal, Tharu people celebrate Jur Sital (also known as Siruwa) on the first day of the year in the month of Vaisakha by sprinkling water on each other. The elders put water on the forehead and head of the young ones with blessing, while the young people put water on the feet of the elders to pay respect. Compatriots sprinkle water on each other's body.

== Official significance ==
Maithili Calendar is the traditional Calendar of Mithila region of India and Nepal. After a long period of demand, Bihar government in 2011 declared this day as public holiday to be observed statewide. Officially, the Maithili New year day is called as Mithila Diwas by the Government of Bihar. Every year there will be holiday for Mithila Diwas on 14 April in the Indian State of Bihar on account of the great festival of Juir Sheetal.

== Gallery ==
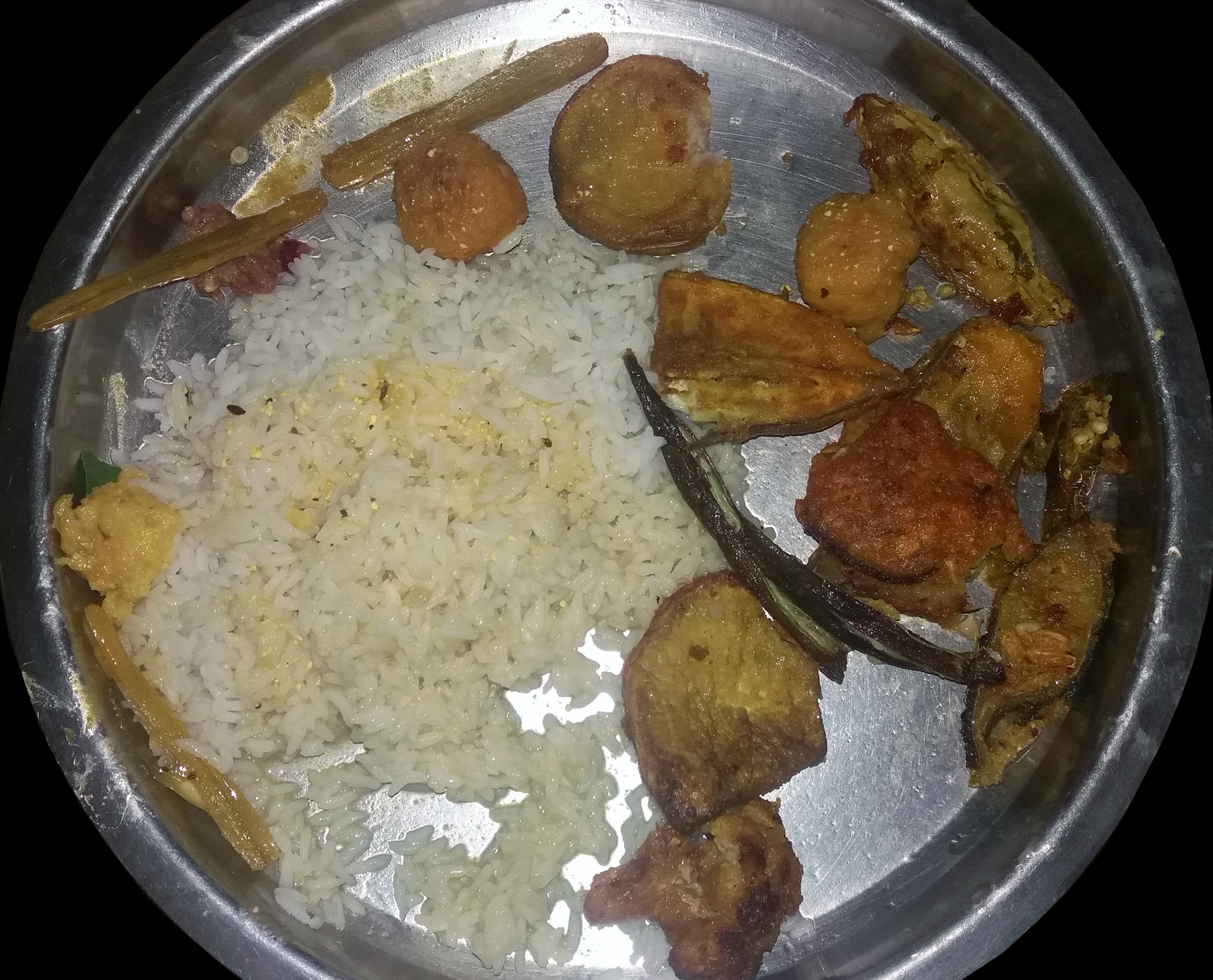
Maithili New Year's Thali

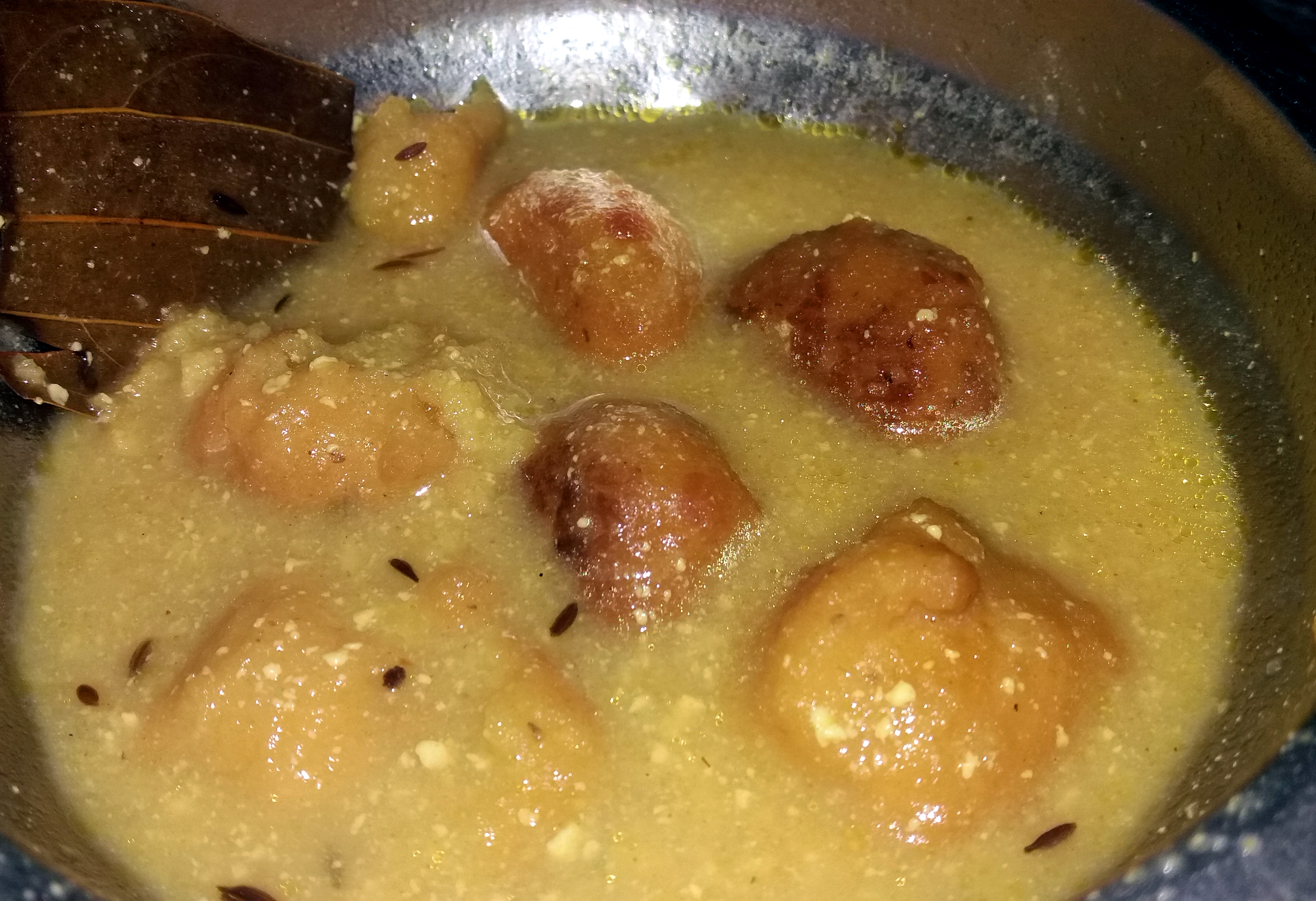
Maithili New Year, kadhi bari

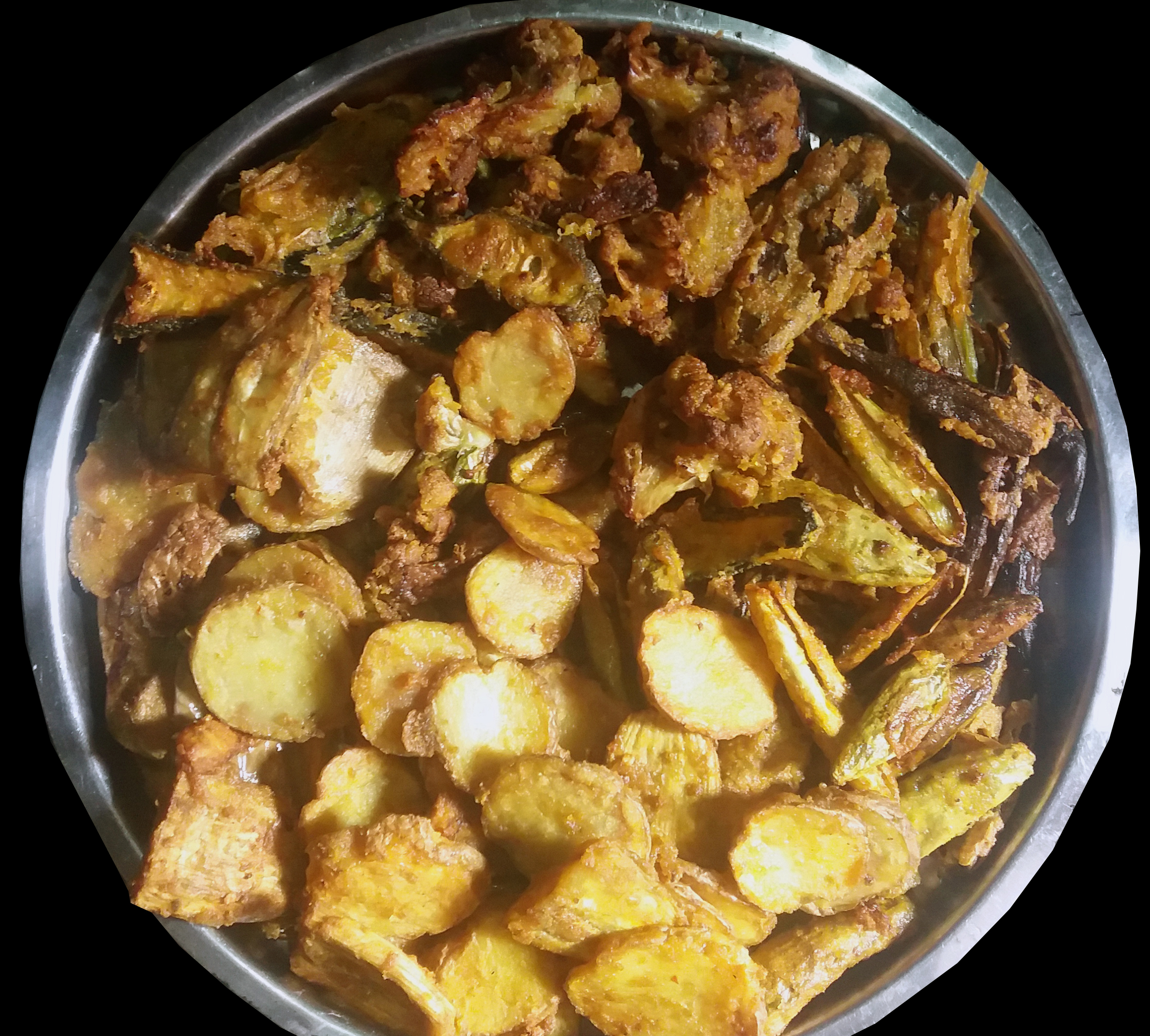
Maithili New Year, taruwa thali

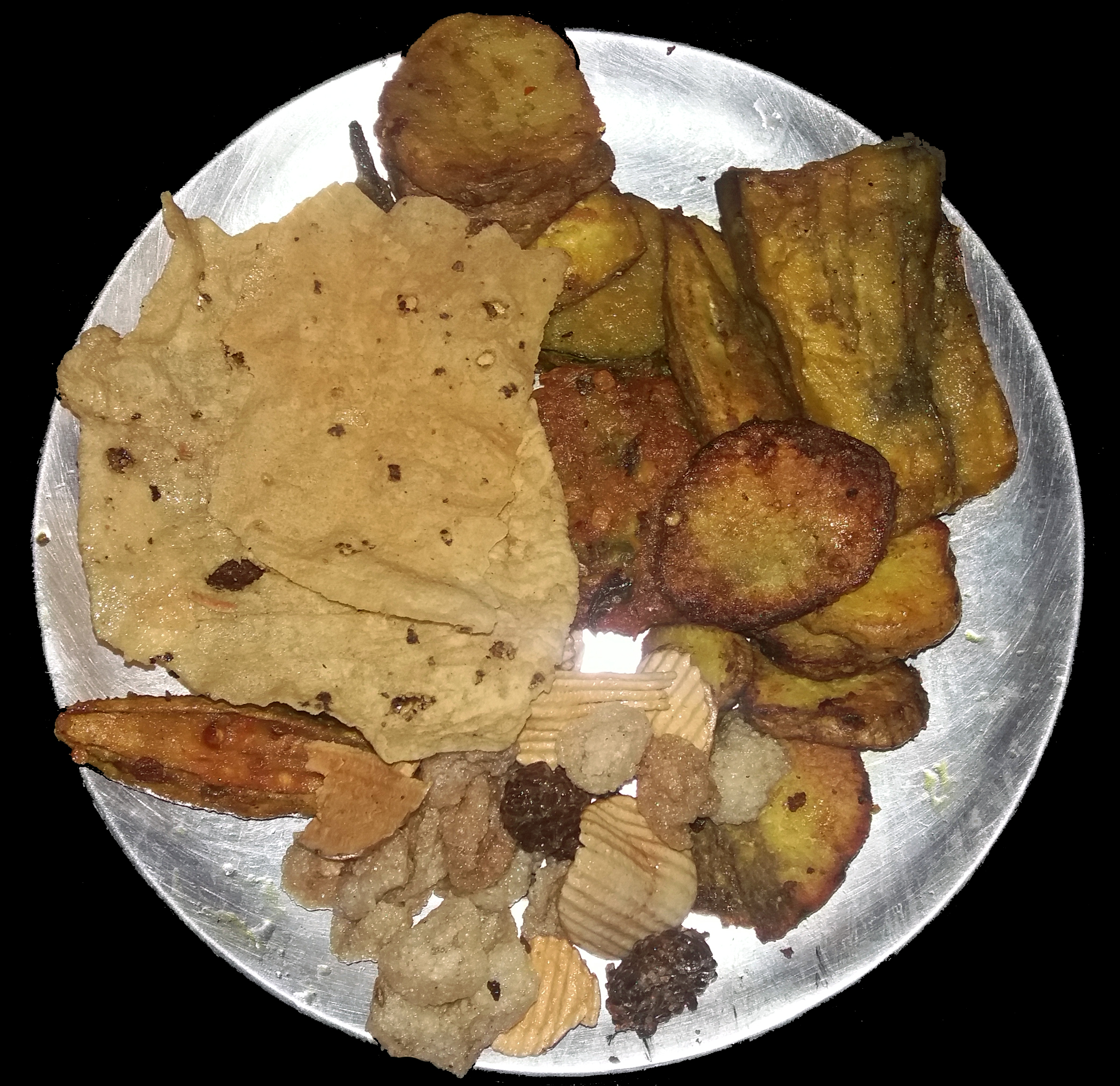
Maithili New Year, taruwa plate

== See also ==
- Mithila (region)
- Mithila (India)
- Mithila (Nepal)
- Tirhut
- Tirhuta script
- Maithili language
- Begusarai
- Madhubani
- Saharsa
- Supaul
- Muzaffarpur
- Vidyapati
- Darbhanga
