= Bhutia =

Tibetic-speaking ethnic group of India

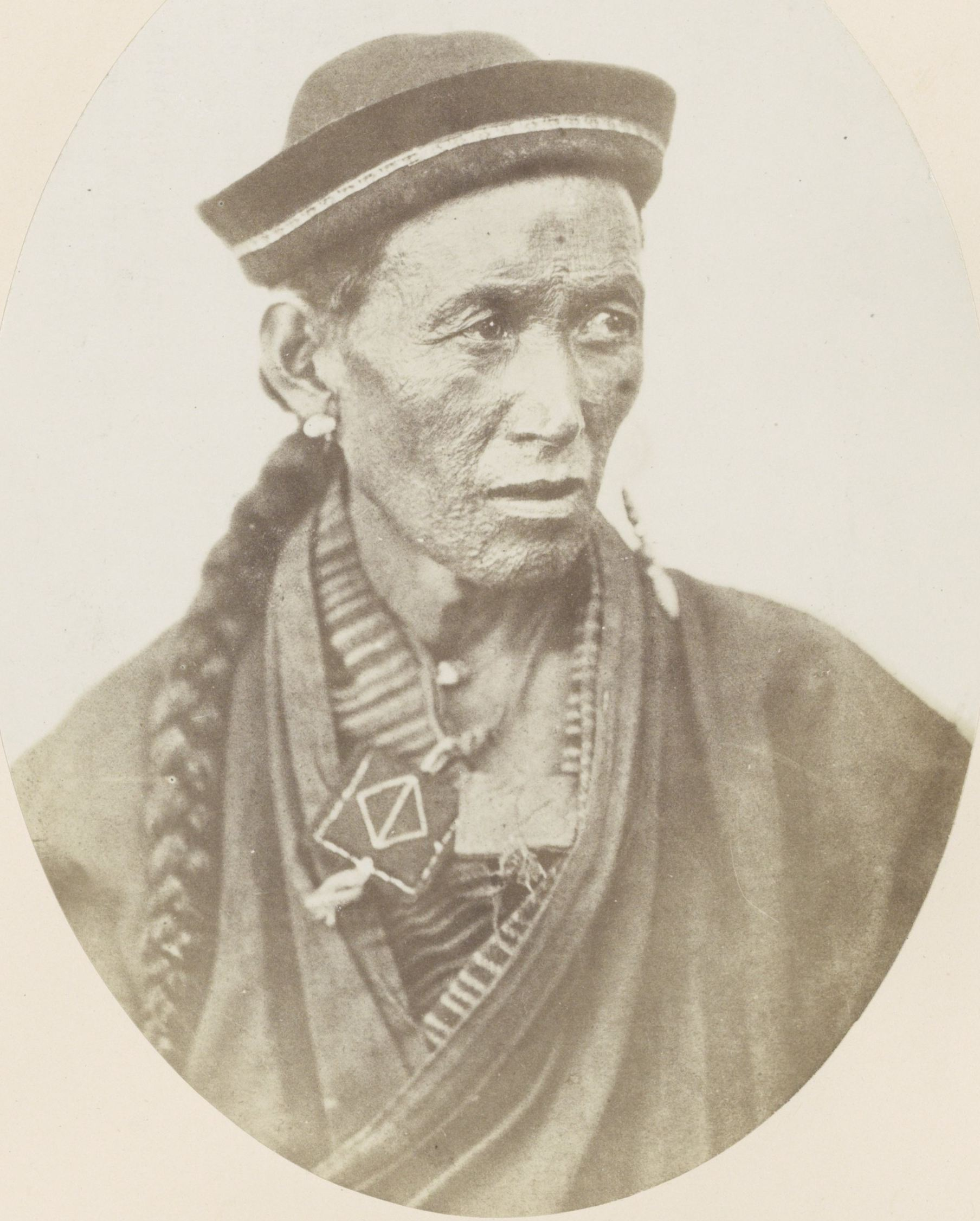
- A man from the Bhutia tribe in 1860s. Here he can be seen wearing a "Tibetan Amulet" to protect him from evil spirits.

Total population
- 60,300 (2001)

Regions with significant populations
- Sikkim: 41,889
- Nepal: 10,087
- Bhutan: 6,000
- West Bengal: 4,293

Languages
- Sikkimese, Nepali, Dzongkha, Tibetan

Religion
- Majority: Vajrayana Buddhism; Minority: Christianity, Islam

Related ethnic groups
- Tibetan, Sherpa, Tamang, Yolmo; Other Tibeto-Burman people

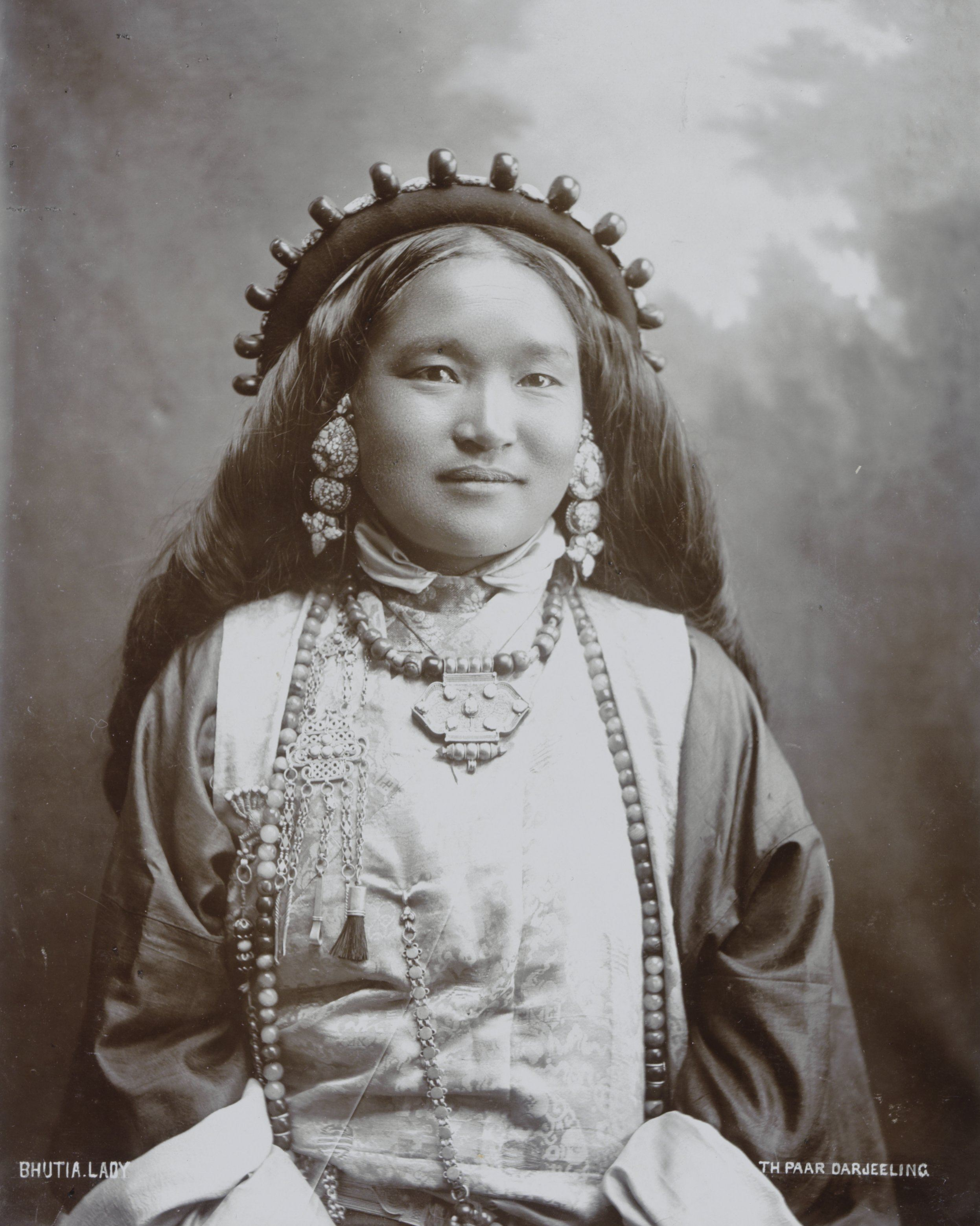
A Bhutia woman with precious coral headdress, agate Buddhist prayer beads, turquoise earrings and silk chuba before 1915 in Darjeeling

The Bhutias (exonym; Nepali: भुटिया, 'People from Tibet') or Drejongpas (endonym; Tibetan: འབྲས་ལྗོངས་པ་, Wylie: Bras-ljongs-pa, THL: dre-jong pa, 'People of the Rice Valley') are a Tibetan ethnic group native to the Indian state of Sikkim who speak Drejongke, a Tibetic language which descends from Old Tibetan. The majority of Bhutias live in Sikkim, while a significant number also reside in the Darjeeling and Kalimpong districts of northern West Bengal and in countries such as Nepal and Bhutan.

== Language ==
The language spoken by the Bhutias of Sikkim is Drejongke, a Tibetic language which has a lexical similarity of 65% with Dzongkha, the language of Bhutan. By comparison, Drejongke is only 42% lexically similar with Standard Tibetan. Sikkimese has also been influenced to some degree by the neighboring Yolmo and Tamang languages.

== History ==
Migration from Tibet to Sikkim in small numbers occurred since the 8th century. However, the 13th century saw an increase in migrations as many clans came with Gyed Bum Sa. Constant conflicts between the Red hat and Yellow Hat sects in Tibet caused a series of Lamas movement southwards. With the final victory of the Yellow hats in the mid-1600s, there was a mass persecution of the followers of the Red hat sect by the victorious Güshi Khan and his Gelug allies. Many, fearing the same fate as their Red hat brethren, fled southwards towards Sikkim and Bhutan, migrating through the different passes in the Himalayas. In consequence, there are Red hat majorities in both Bhutan and Sikkim to this day. Geographical indications in the Bhutias last names are common. In Northern Sikkim, for example, where the Bhutias are the majority inhabitants, they are known as the Lachenpas or Lachungpas, meaning inhabitants of La chen (Tibetan: ལ་ཆེན་; 'big pass') or La chung (Tibetan: ལ་ཆུང་; 'small pass') respectively.

Bhutia aristocrats were called Kazis after similar landlord titles in neighboring regions, especially in modern-day Bangladesh. This feudal system was an integral part of the Chogyal monarchy prior to 1975, when Sikkim was an independent monarchy; the ruling dynasty of the Kingdom of Sikkim before the mid-1970s plebiscite was the Bhutia Namgyal dynasty. Among the Bhutias, the Lachenpas and Lachungpas have their own traditional legal system called the "Dzumsa" which means 'the meeting place of the people'. The Dzumsa is headed by the village headman known as the Pipon. People of North Sikkim have been given full protection by the state government by deeming a status of Panchayat ward and the Pipon, a status of Panchayat head.

== Clans ==
There are many clans within the Bhutia tribe. Inter-clan marriages are preferred rather than marriages outside of the clan. Traditionally, the Bhutias were divided into two groups:

(i) Tondu rus-shi, within which they have four rus, namely, Chechutharpa, Shangdarpa, Kachopa, and Shengapa.

(ii) Beb tsen gye, which includes eight rus, namely, Gensapa, Namchangopa, Chungiopa, Ithenpa, Phenchungpa, Phenpunadik, Namanpa, and Nachangpa.

== Clothing ==
The traditional outfit of Bhutias is the kho (similar to the Tibetan chuba), which is a loose cloak-like garment fastened at the neck on one side and near the waist with a silk/cotton belt. Male members array the kho with loose trousers. Bhutia women traditionally wear sleeveless, floor-length dresses called mo kho (or bakhu in Nepali) which is worn over a full sleeved shirt called teygho and tied to the waist with a silk belt called kyera. On the front, a loose sheet of multicolored woolen cloth with exotic geometric designs is tied, this is called the pangden which is a symbol of a married woman. This traditional outfit is complemented by embroidered leather boots worn by both men and women.

Bhutia women enjoy a much higher status than their counterparts from other communities. Pure gold tends to be favored by both women and men thus traditional jewelry is mostly made of twenty-four carat, pure gold.

== Society ==
In Sikkim, the Bhutias are mostly employed in the government sector, in agriculture, and increasingly in the business area as well. In the district of Darjeeling, Bhutias are often employed in government and commerce. Bhutias practise intermarriage within their clans and follow a very hierarchical system of bride and groom selection. Clan discrimination is widespread, and marriage outside the community is looked down upon.

== Religion ==
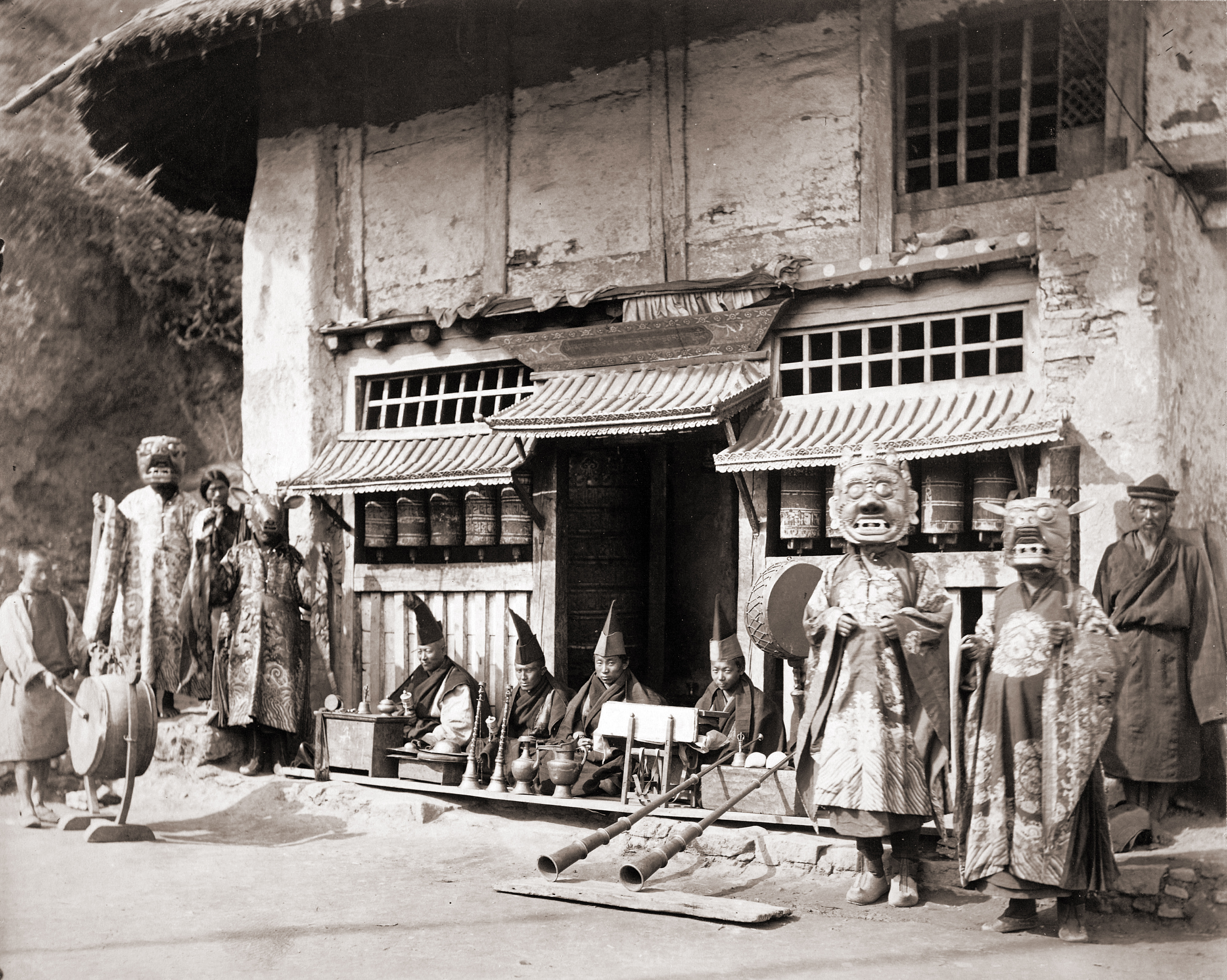
Buddhist monastery in Darjeeling, 1870

The Bhutias are followers of Vajrayana Buddhism, mainly the Nyingma and Kagyu schools. The main festivals observed by them are Losar. The first week of February is usually the time of Losar as it marks the start of the Tibetan New Year. Fire dances are common in the evenings during Losar. Losoong is usually celebrated as the end of the Tibetan year and falls at the end of the tenth Tibetan lunar month (usually December). It is the most important festival among the Bhutias in India, and is marked by the traditional Cham dancing and merry-making. Losoong is celebrated across the monasteries in Bhutan, Nepal, and Sikkim. In Sikkim, during the festival of Losoong, often dance forms depict narrativized tales from the life of Padmasambhava or Guru Ugyen.

Monasteries of the Bhutias dot various places in India, most notably the Rumtek Monastery in Sikkim and the Bhutia Busty Monastery or Karma Dorjee Chyoling Monastery in Darjeeling.

== Houses ==
A traditional Bhutia house is called a "khim" and is usually rectangular.

The Bhutias have a stone structure outside the house which is used for burning incense. It is called "sangbum". "Sang" means incense and "bum" means vase; the shape of the structure is like a vase. It is used for burning sang, a sacred offering to the deities. The deities are offered scented dried leaves/stalks of Rhododendron anthopogon, Juniperus recurva, Rhododendron setosum, or incense sticks made of pine.

== Cuisine ==
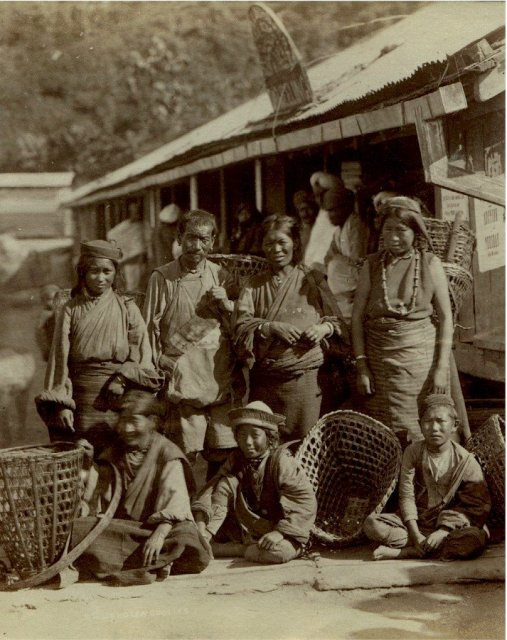
Bhutia in 1875

Bhutia people traditionally eat rice with animal-fat-fried vegetables or meat, usually pork or beef, and occasionally mutton or chicken. Other well-known foods are momo, steamed meat dumplings, and the thukpa, noodles in broth. The Losar and Loosong are two among many festivals celebrated by the Bhutia community. Almost all Bhutia festivals and holidays hold Buddhist religious significance. They are also known to utilize over 70 species of animal, fungi, and plant. Chhaang is the favorite drink of the Bhutias, and increasingly of other communities coexisting with the Bhutias. It is made of fermented barley or millet, and served in a bamboo container called the Tongba. Tea with milk and sugar, and butter tea, are also served on religious or social occasions.

== Arts, crafts, and music ==
The Bhutia have a rich tradition of dances, songs, and folktales. The popular Bhutia folk dances are Denzong-Neh-Na, Ta-Shi-Yang-Ku, Tashi Shabdo, Guru-Chinlap, Singhi Chham and Yak Chham.

Musical instruments used are flute, yangjey, drum, and yarga.

== Status within India ==
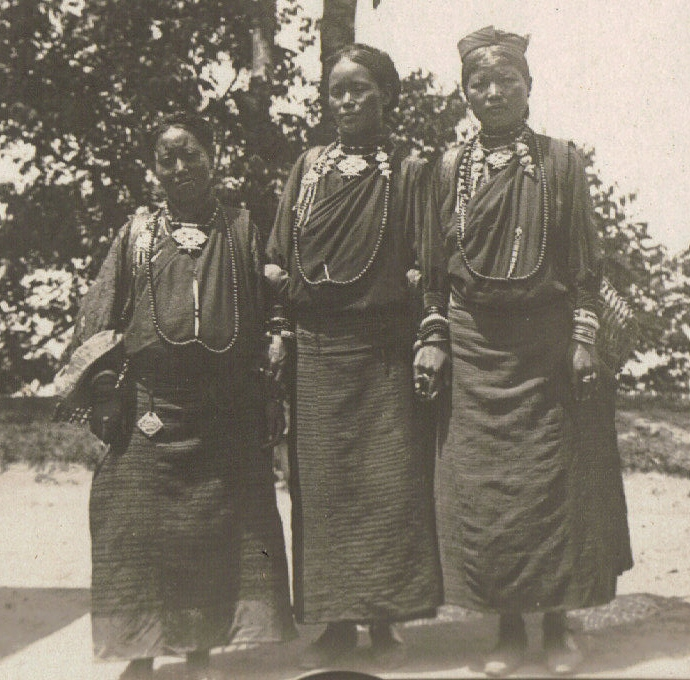
Sikkim Bhutia women about 1903

Within the Dominion of India, the Bhutias as recognized as Scheduled Tribes in the states of Sikkim, West Bengal and Tripura.

On August 26, 2015, during her visit to Darjeeling, the Mamata Banerjee-led West Bengal government, announced the formation of a separate development board for the Bhutia community.

== Notable Bhutias ==
- Bhaichung Bhutia - former Indian football captain
- Kazi Lhendup Dorjee - first chief minister of Sikkim from 1975 to 1979
- Pem Dorji - former Indian football captain
- Ganju Lama - recipient of the Victoria Cross
- Norden Tenzing Bhutia - musician, composer and singer
- Samten Bhutia - film director and writer
- Danny Denzongpa - Bollywood actor
- Karma Loday Bhutia - Sikkim politician
- Ugyen Tshering Gyatso Bhutia - Sikkim politician
- Tashi Thendup Bhutia - Sikkim politician
- Dorjee Dazom Bhutia - Sikkim politician
- Nadong Bhutia - Indian footballer
- Kunzang Bhutia - Indian footballer
- Namgyal Bhutia - Indian footballer
- Sonam Bhutia - Indian footballer
- Thupden Bhutia - Indian footballer
- Lako Phuti Bhutia - Indian women's footballer
- Tshering Bhutia - Sikkim first-class cricketer
- Karma Bhutia - Sikkim first-class cricketer
- Mandup Bhutia - Sikkim first-class cricketer
- Rinzing Bhutia - Sikkim first-class cricketer

== See also ==
- Vajrayana Buddhism
- Sikkimese language
- Indigenous peoples of Sikkim
