= Syabru (dance) =

Himalayan folk dance

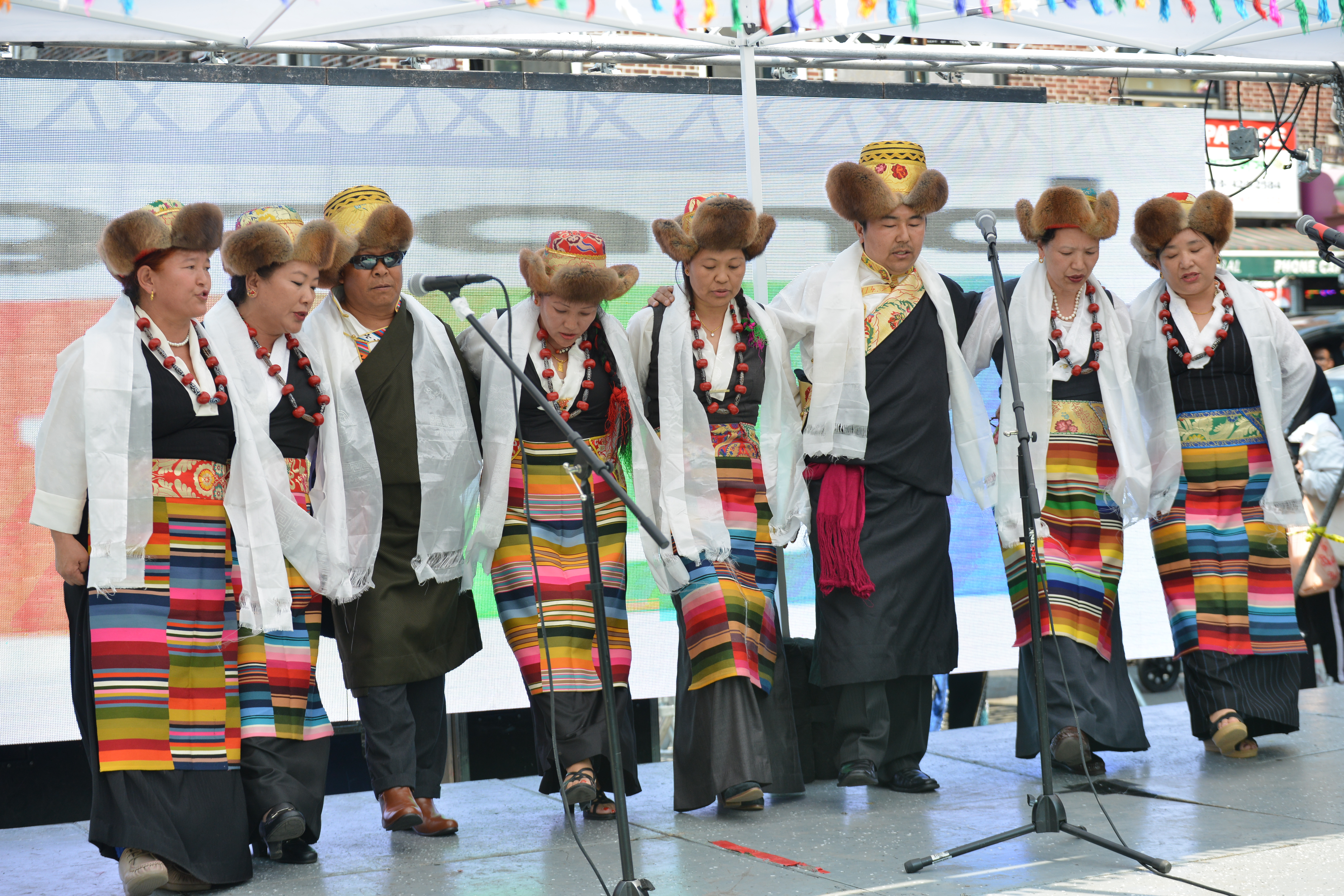
- People performing Syabru dance at Everest Day 2019 in New York
- Genre: Himalayan folk dance
- Instrument: Tungna

Syabru (Nepali: स्याब्रु नाच) is a traditional Nepalese Himalayan folk dance. It is primarily performed by the people of the Sherpa and Yolmo communities. It is also performed by other Himalayan communities of Nepal. The dance is performed in every festival, gathering as well as on various auspicious events.

== Performance ==
The dance is performed in a group, with both men and women participating. People wear their ethnic clothes while performing the dance. People sing traditional folk songs while moving slowly in a line or a circulus while performing the dance. The songs are often accompanied by traditional instruments such as Dramnyen

== Preservation ==
Alongside various folk dances of Nepal, the popularity of Syabru dance is also being decreased. In order to preserve and promote the dance form, various competitions, workshops and awareness programmes are being conducted. The dance is an essential ritual during the Gyalpo Lhosar celebration.
