= Domthok Monastery =

Buddhist monastery in Qinghai, China

Domthok Monastery is a Buddhist monastery in Yushu County, Qinghai, China. It is 60 km southeast of Gyêgu on the western bank of the Dri Chu (Yangtze River) at 32.62924, 97.53449. A footbridge crosses the river here. The monastery is affiliated with Dzongsar Monastery, south of Derge, in Garze County, Sichuan.

There are two shops, a general store run by the monks and close by another selling Tibetan medicines. Petrol can be purchased in the yard adjacent to the newly built (2011) hostel. A small Tibetan village surrounds the monastery.

== Gallery ==
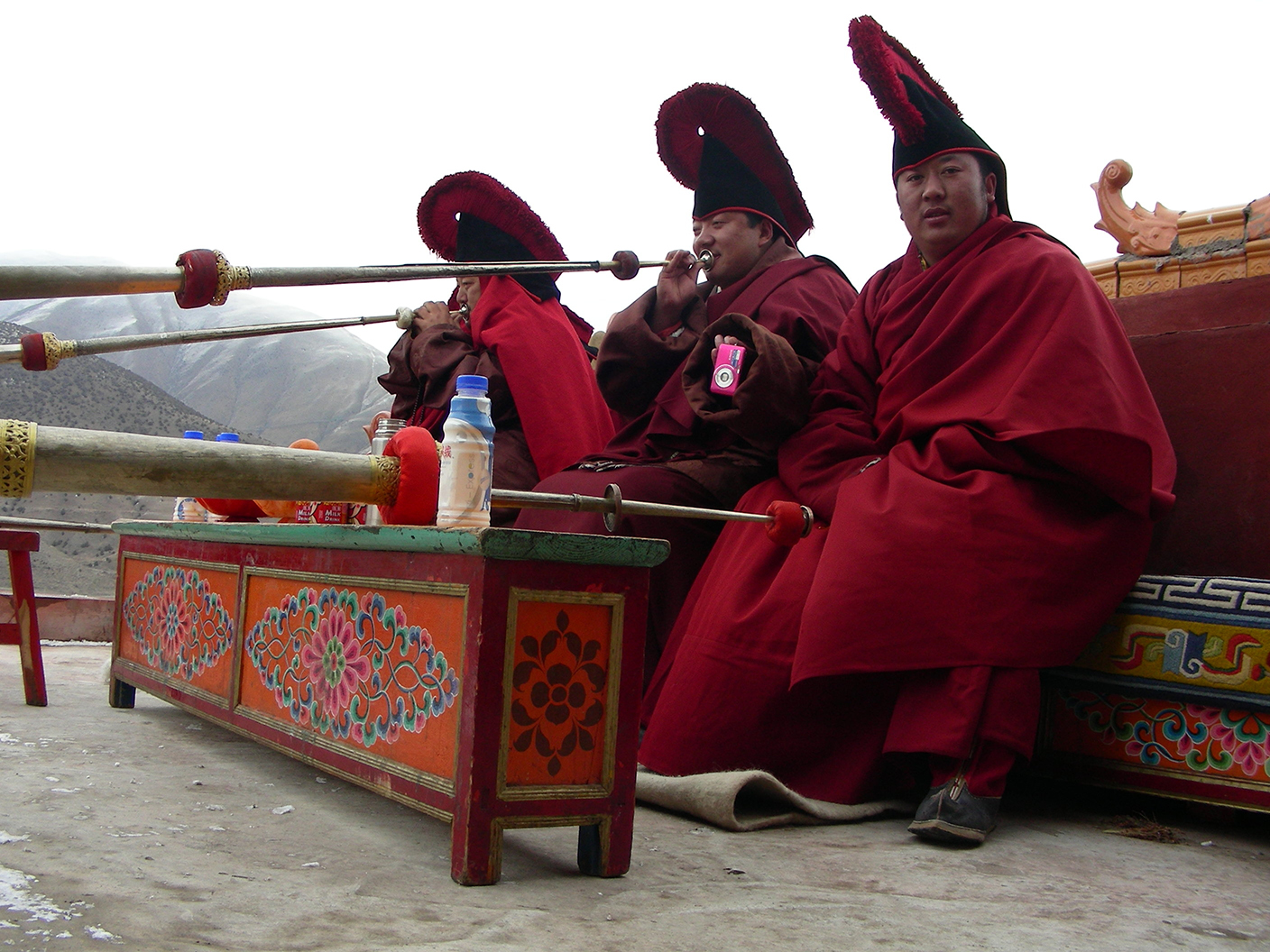
Domthok Monks playing Tibetan Trumpets

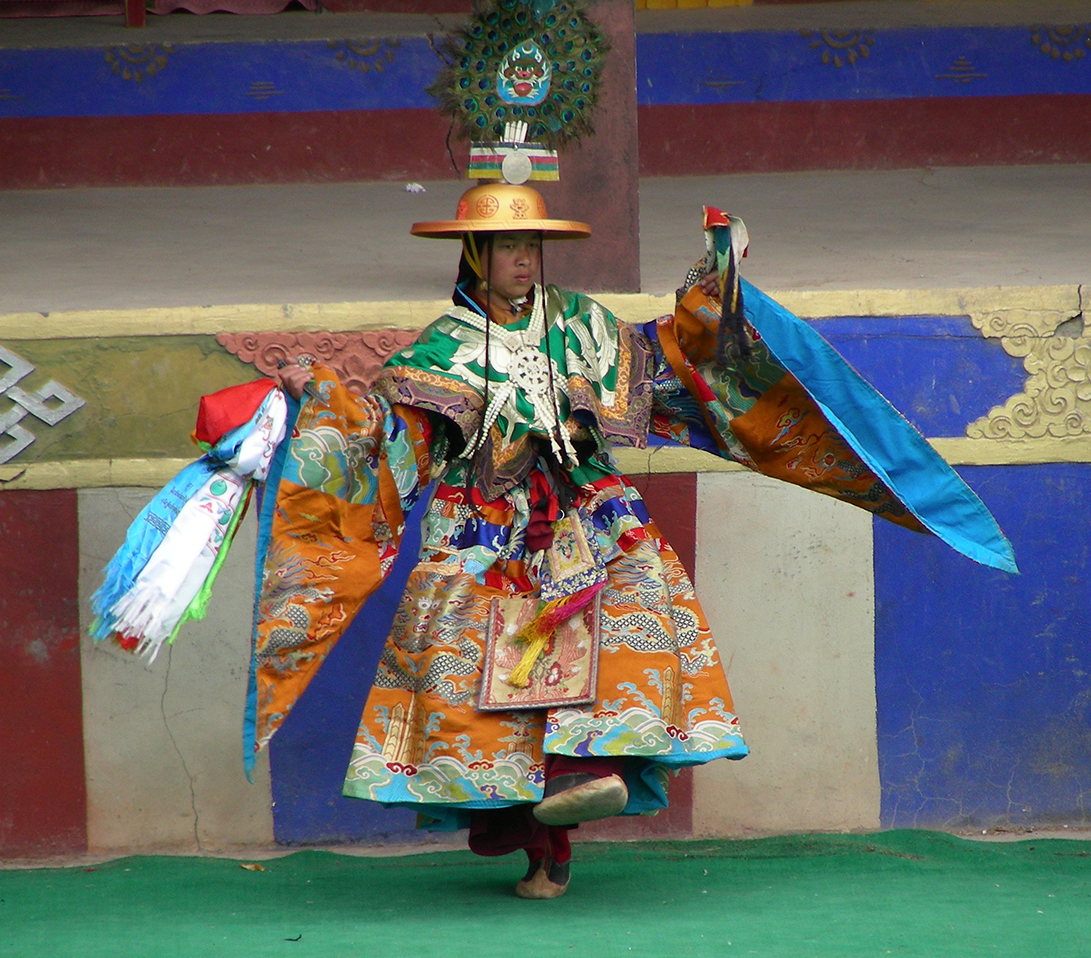
Domthok Monks dancing at Tibetan New Year

Domthok Monks at Tibetan New Year
