= Sonam Lhosar =

New year festival of Hyolmo people of Nepal

Sonam Lhochhar
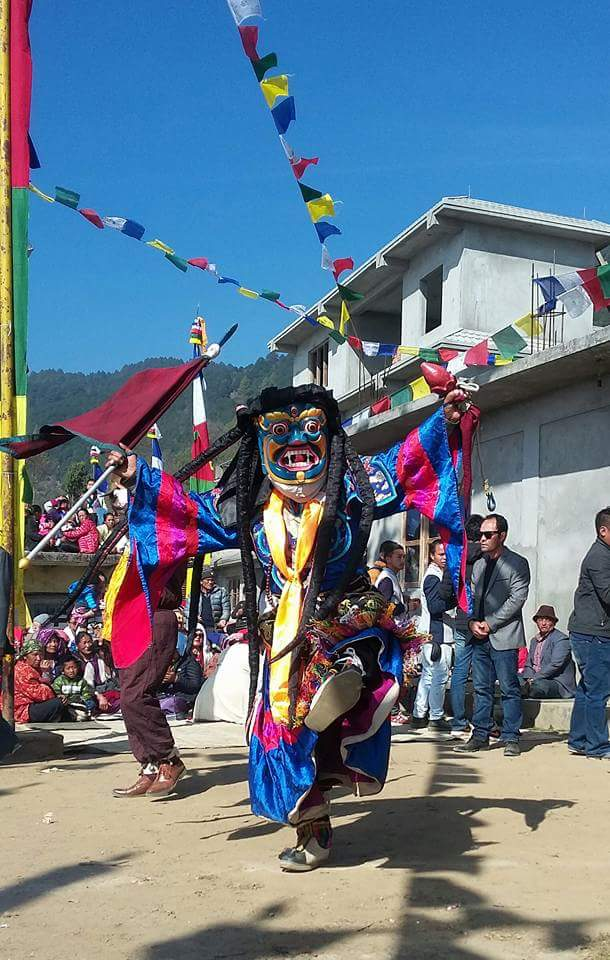
- Sonam Lhochhar celebration
- Observed by: Tamang and Hyolmo communities
- Liturgical color: Red
- Type: Tamang festival
- Significance: Marks the beginning of the Tamang New Year
- Date: Magh Shukla Pratipada
- Frequency: Annual
- Related to: Losar, Losoong

Sonam Lhochhar is a New Year's day festival of the Tamang and Hyolmo people of Nepal as well as Sikkim and Darjeeling regions of India. It falls on the second new moon after the winter solstice which is usually the Magh Sukla Pratipada based on the eastern lunar calendar.

Years are associated with 12 different animals - rat, ox, tiger, rabbit, dragon, snake, horse, goat/sheep, monkey, rooster, dog, and boar. Historically, the festival is celebrated after harvesting the crops.

== Activities ==
In Sonam Lhosar, the Tamang and Hyolmo people visit monasteries and stupas, make sacrifices, while special rituals with masked dances are performed to drive away evil spirits. The houses and surroundings are cleaned to welcome gods and goddesses.

Khapse and Babar (kind of like chapati but made of rice) and Thongsey are mainly eaten in the Hyolmo community.

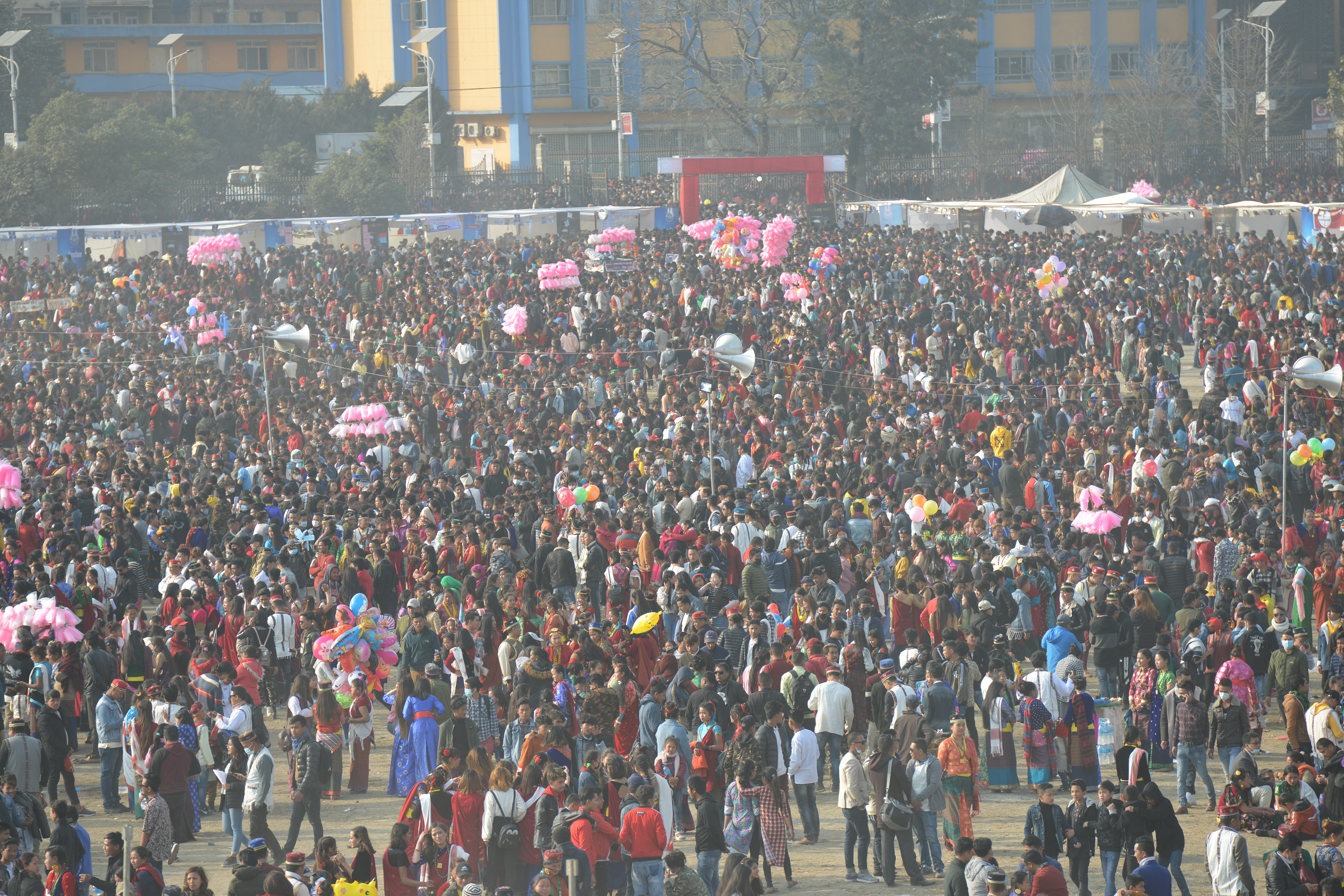
Tamang Sonam Losar celebration 2019 in Kathmandu, Nepal

People wear traditional dresses and jewellery to participate in cultural events and exchange greetings. Tamang Selo and Damphu are played in the festival for dance. Syabru is a commonly performed dance in the Hyolmo and Rasuwali Tamang communities.

== See also ==
- Sonam Lhosar, New Year's day of Tamang and Hyolmo people
- Gyalpo Lhosar, New Year's day of Sherpa people
- Tamu Lhosar, New Year's day of Gurung people
- Lhosar, Tibetan New Year's day
