= Losar =

Tibetan new year

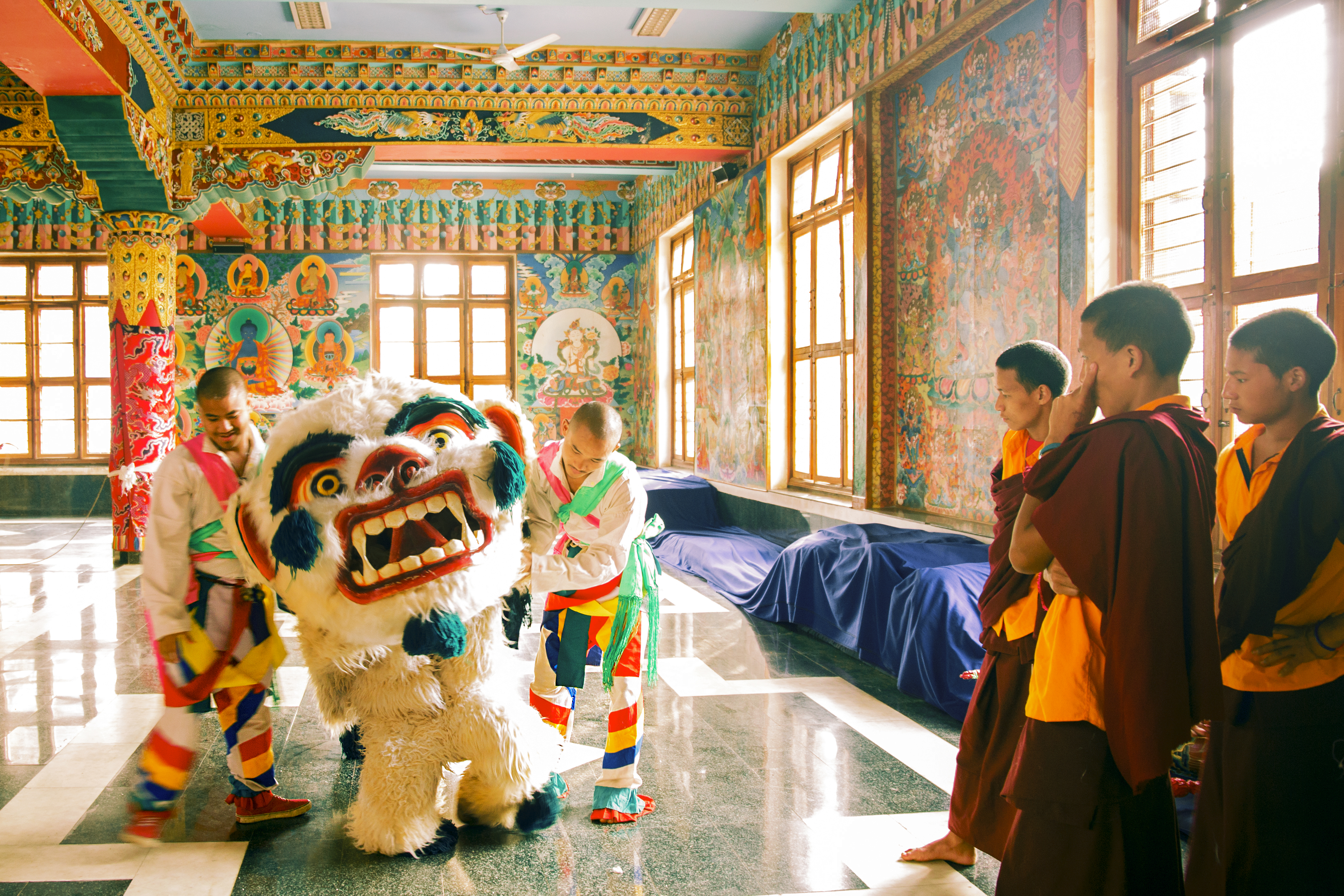
- Snow lion dance during Losar Tibetan festival
- Also called: Tibetan New Year; Losar
- Observed by: Tibetans, Bhutanese, Ladakhis, Sherpas, Tamangs, Monpas, worldwide Tibetan Buddhists
- Type: Tibetan culture, Tibetan Buddhist, New year
- Significance: Symbolizes the renewal of life, prosperity, and spiritual cleansing
- Duration: 15 days
- Frequency: Annual
- Related to: Galdan Namchot, Losoong, Gyalpo Losar, Tamu Lhosar, Sonam Lhosar, Mayfung

Losar (Tibetan: ལོ་གསར་, Wylie: lo-sar; "new year"), also known as the Tibetan New Year, is a festival in Tibetan Buddhism. The holiday is celebrated on various dates depending on location tradition (Tibet, Bhutan, Nepal, Arunachal Pradesh, Sikkim and Ladakh). The holiday is a new year's festival, celebrated on the first day of the lunisolar Tibetan calendar, which corresponds to a date in February or March in the Gregorian calendar. In 2025, the new year commenced on February 28 and was celebrated until March 2. It also commenced the Year of the Female Wood Snake.

The variation of the festival in Nepal is called Sonam Lhosar and is observed about eight weeks earlier than the Tibetan Losar.

== History ==
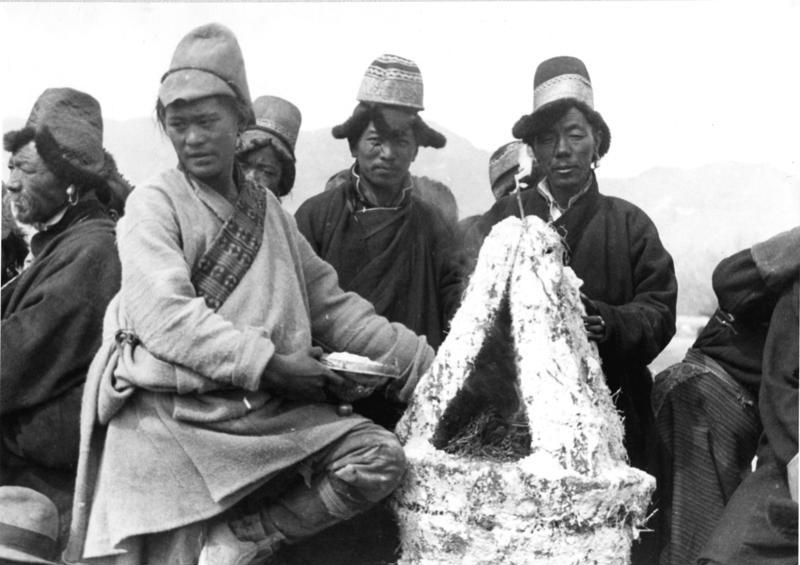
Losar celebration in Lhasa, 1938

Losar predates the arrival of Buddhism in Tibet and has its roots in a winter incense-burning custom of the Bon religion. The Tibetan new year is counted by the current year added to 127 BCE, the year the first Tibetan king Nyatri Tsenpo founded the Yarlung dynasty. During the reign of the ninth Tibetan king, Pude Gungyal (317–398 CE), it is said that this custom merged with a harvest festival to form the annual Losar festival.

The 14th Dalai Lama (1998: p. 233) frames the importance of consulting the Nechung Oracle for Losar:

For hundreds of years now, it has been traditional for the Dalai Lama, and the Government, to consult Nechung during the New Year festivals.

Tenzin Wangyal frames his experience of Tibetan cultural practice of Losar in relation to elemental celebrations and offerings to Nāga (Tibetan: Klu):

During Losar, the Tibetan celebration of the new year, we did not drink champagne to celebrate. Instead, we went to the local spring to perform a ritual of gratitude. We made offerings to the nagas, the water spirits who activated the water element in the area. We made smoke offerings to the local spirits associated with the natural world around us. Beliefs and behaviors like ours evolved long ago and are often seen as primitive in the West. But they are not only projections of human fears onto the natural world, as some anthropologists and historians suggest. Our way of relating to the elements originated in the direct experiences by our sages and common people of the sacred nature of the external and internal elements. We call these elements earth, water, fire, air, and space.

Losar is celebrated in the city of Dharamsala in India and in other Tibetan Buddhist communities.

== Practice ==
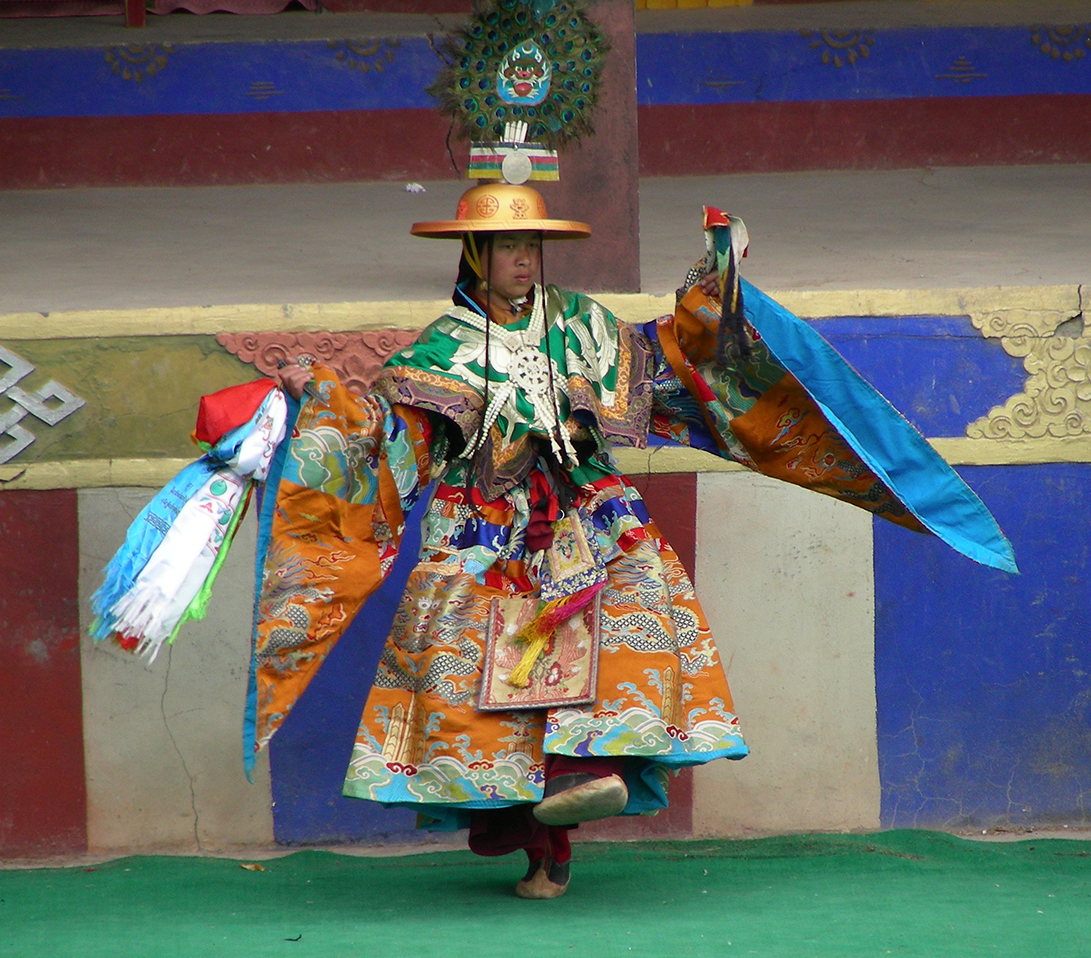
A Tibetan monk performance during Losar at Domthok Monastery in the Kham region

Losar is celebrated for 15 days, with the main celebrations on the first three days. On the first day of Losar, a beverage called changkol is made from chhaang (a Tibetan-Nepali equivalent of beer). The second day of Losar is known as King's Losar (gyalpo losar). Losar is traditionally preceded by the five-day practice of Vajrakilaya. Because the Uyghurs adopted the Chinese calendar, and the Mongols and Tibetans adopted the Uyghur calendar, Losar occurs near or on the same day as the Chinese New Year and the Mongolian New Year, but the traditions of Losar are unique to Tibet, and predate both Indian and Chinese influences.

As well as that, the Sherpas are associated with Losar and enjoy Losar in the high altitudes of the Nepal Himalayan Range. Prior to the Chinese invasion of Tibet in 1950, Losar began with a morning ritual ceremony at Namgyal Monastery, led by the Dalai Lama and other high-ranking lamas, with government officials participating, to honor the Dharmapala (dharma-protector) Palden Lhamo. After the Dalai Lama was exiled, many monasteries were destroyed and monks imprisoned. Since that time, Tibetan Buddhist practice in Tibet has been difficult to observe publicly.

Losar forms part of the culture of Ladakh for Buddhists residing in that region.

In Tibet, various customs are associated with the holiday:

Families prepare for Losar some days in advance by thoroughly cleaning their homes; decorating with fragrant flowers and their walls with auspicious signs painted in flour such as the sun, moon, or a reversed swastika; and preparing cedar, rhododendron, and juniper branches for burning as incense. Debts are settled, quarrels are resolved, new clothes are acquired, and special foods such as kapse (fried twists) are made. A favorite drink is chang (barley beer) which is served warm. Because the words "sheep's head" and "beginning of the year" sound similar in Tibetan, it is customary to fashion a sheep's head from colored butter as a decoration. Another traditional decoration that symbolizes a good harvest is the phyemar ("five-grain bucket"), a bucket with a wooden board that creates two vertical halves within. This bucket is filled with zanba (also known as tsamba, roasted qingke barley flour) and barley seeds, then decorated with barley ears and colored butter.

Losar celebrated on the first day of the lunisolar Tibetan calendar in Bhutan is called Dawa Dangpa Losar. The losar customs in Bhutan are similar to, but distinct from, customs in neighboring Tibet. Modern celebration of the holiday began in Bhutan in 1637, when Zhabdrung Ngawang Namgyal commemorated the completion of the Punakha Dzong with an inaugural ceremony, in which "Bhutanese came from all over the country to bring offerings of produce from their various regions, a tradition that is still reflected in the wide variety of foods consumed during the ritual Losar meals." Traditional foods consumed on the occasion include sugarcane and green bananas, which are considered auspicious. In Bhutan, picnicking, dancing, singing, dart-playing, archery (see archery in Bhutan), and the giving of offerings are all traditions.

The Dalai Lama blesses many Buddhists in Dharamsala during Losar, from the young to the old, and they form a queue to manage the number of people who visit the Dalai Lama's temple to do this.

== Dates ==
The Tibetan calendar is a lunisolar calendar. Losar is celebrated on the first through third days of the first lunar month.

| Gregorian Year | Year of Rabjung 60-year Cycle | Tibetan Year | Losar Date*** | Gender, Element, and Animal |
|---|---|---|---|---|
| 2008 | rab byung 17 lo 22 | 2135 | February 21 | Male Earth Mouse/Rat** |
| 2009 | rab byung 17 lo 23 | 2136 | February 10 | Female Earth Ox |
| 2010 | rab byung 17 lo 24 | 2137 | March 1 | Male Iron Tiger |
| 2011 | rab byung 17 lo 25 | 2138 | February 18 | Female Iron Hare/Rabbit** |
| 2012 | rab byung 17 lo 26 | 2139 | February 8 | Male Water Dragon |
| 2013 | rab byung 17 lo 27 | 2140 | February 26 | Female Water Snake |
| 2014 | rab byung 17 lo 28 | 2141 | February 15 | Male Wood Horse |
| 2015 | rab byung 17 lo 29 | 2142 | March 6 | Female Wood Sheep/Goat** |
| 2016 | rab byung 17 lo 30 | 2143 | February 23 | Male Fire Monkey |
| 2017 | rab byung 17 lo 31 | 2144 | February 11 | Female Fire Bird/Rooster |
| 2018 | rab byung 17 lo 32 | 2145 | March 2 | Male Earth Dog |
| 2019 | rab byung 17 lo 33 | 2146 | February 20 | Female Earth Pig/Boar** |
| 2020 | rab byung 17 lo 34 | 2147 | February 9 | Male Iron Mouse/Rat** |
| 2021 | rab byung 17 lo 35 | 2148 | February 27 | Female Earth Ox |
| 2022 | rab byung 17 lo 36 | 2149 | February 17 | Male Water Tiger |
| 2023 | rab byung 17 lo 37 | 2150 | February 6 | Female Water Hare |
| 2024 | rab byung 17 lo 38 | 2151 | February 10 | Male Wood Dragon |
| 2025 | rab byung 17 lo 39 | 2152 | February 28 | Female Wood Snake |
| 2026 | rab byung 17 lo 40 | 2153 | February 18 | Male Fire Horse |

* Note: Rabjung (Wylie: rab byung) is the name of the 60-year cycle of the Tibetan calendar that started in 1027 CE, and is currently in its 17th cycle.
** Note: These year names have more than one translation into English with different terms used by different groups.
*** Note: Losar is celebrated by some international communities at more or less the same time it is celebrated in Asia. For example, for a year when Losar starts on February 1 in Asia time zones, it may be celebrated by some in United States time zones on January 31. Losar celebrations are normally for three days.

== Variations ==
| Name | Tamu Losar | Gyalpo Losar | Sonam Losar |
|---|---|---|---|
| Ethnicity | Gurung community | Sherpa and Tibetan communities | Tamang and Hyolmo communities |
| Celebration Month | December or January | February or March | December or January |
| Days of Celebration | 1 day | 15 days | 3 to 7 days |
| Where is it celebrated | Lamjung, Gorkha, Tanahun, and Kathmandu | Boudhanath, Swayambhunath, and Solukhumbu | Boudhanath, Swayambhunath, and communities in Kathmandu |
| Festivities | Cultural programs, traditional music, and family gatherings | Cleaning and decorating homes, family gatherings, visiting monasteries for prayers, music, and dances | Cultural events, Visiting monasteries |
| Traditional Dances | Chandi and Ghatu | Ghorsey, Cham, and Syabru | Tamang Selo |
| Food and beverages | Sel roti, tongba | Guthuk soup and Khapse | Sel roti, Gundruk, Khapse |

== See also ==
- Galdan Namchot
- Losoong Festival
- Lunar New Year
- Nepali calendar
- Tibetan astrology
- Tibetan calendar
- Lunar New Year: Celebrations of Lunar New Year in other parts of Asia
- South and Southeast Asian solar New Year: Similar Asian Lunisolar New Year celebrations that occur in April:
- Mayfung
