= Tamu Lhosar =

New year festival of Gurung people of Nepal

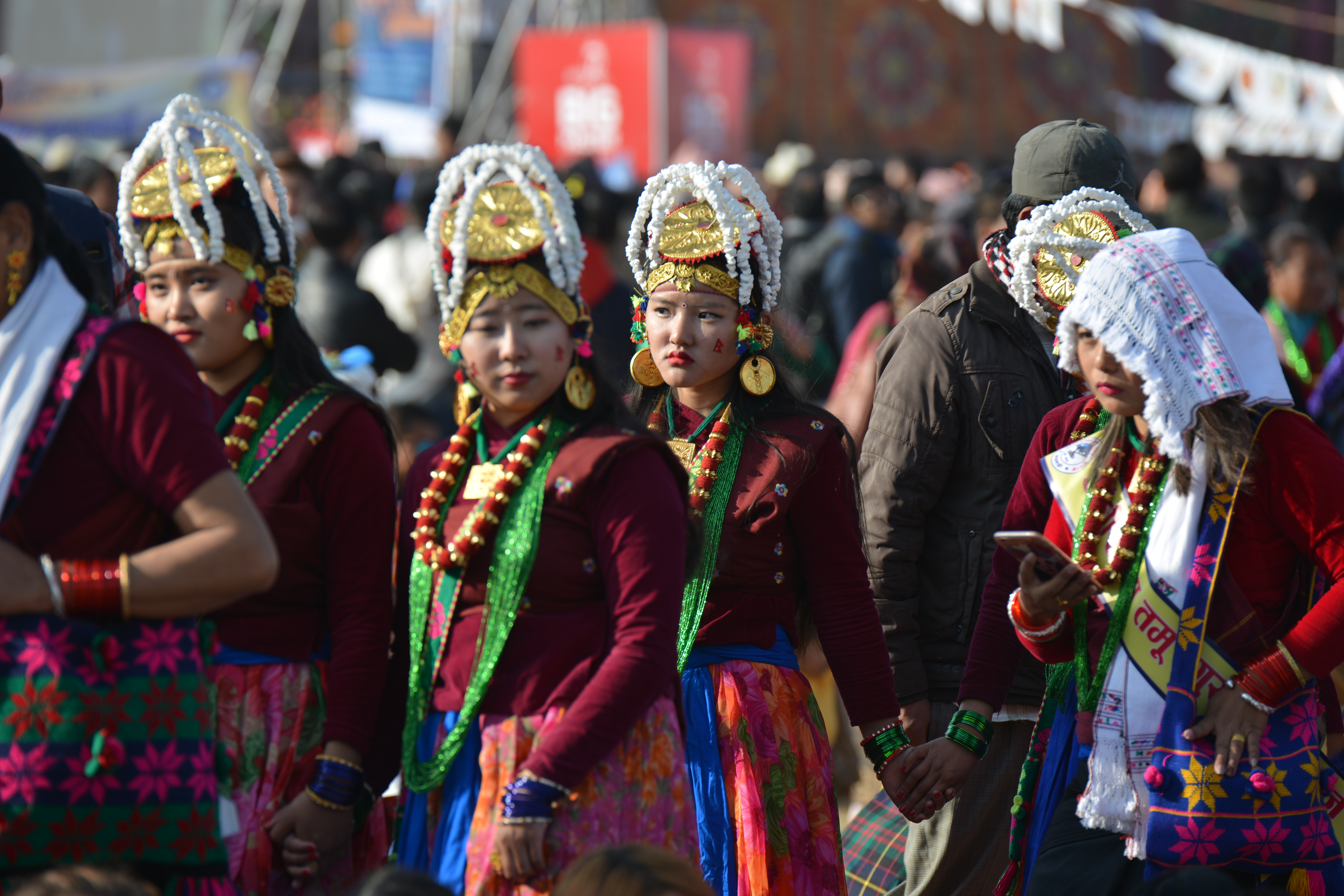
- Tamu Lhosar celebration with Ghatu Dance
- Observed by: Gurung communities
- Type: Gurung festival
- Significance: Signifies the beginning of the Tamu or Gurung calendar
- Observances: People gather together, sing traditional songs, and perform traditional dances
- Date: 15th day of the Nepali month Pausha
- Frequency: Annual
- Related to: Losar, Losoong

Tamu Lhosar is a new year festival celebrated by the Gurung people on every 15th Poush (December/January) of the Nepali calendar. It is observed as a public holiday.

Similar to the Lhosars celebrated by other ethnic groups in Nepal, such as Tamangs and Sherpas, the Gurungs divide the years into 12 cycles, known as Lohokor, with each cycle represented by a different animal. These animals are the eagle, serpent, horse, sheep, monkey, bird, dog, deer, mouse, cow, tiger and cat.

In Tamu kyi, the word Lhosar represents "new" (Lho) and "change" (Sar), with each of the 12 animals signifying a new Lho. The celebration of Lhosar signifies a farewell to the existing Lho to welcome the new one.

== Activities ==
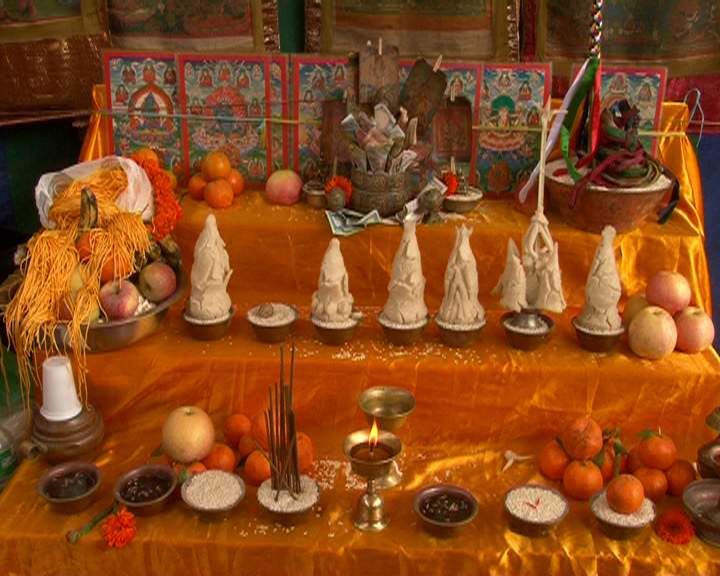
Tamu Lhosar celebration

During the festival, prayer flags are placed on major Buddhist stupas such as Swayambhunath and Boudhanath, as well as on the roofs of people's homes. People dress up in traditional attire; men wear a bhangra, a white apron and a kachhad, a Nepalese traditional white, wrap-around skirt reaching the thighs or knees. Women wear a ghalek and gunyo-cholo, a velvet blouse, and adorn gold ornaments such as earrings and semi-precious stone necklaces. Traditional dances such as the Ghatu dance and Chudka are performed, alongside songs such as "Thado Bhaka".

Home-made Raksi is served during the festivities.

== See also ==
- Gyalpo Lhosar, new year of Sherpa people
- Sonam Lhosar, new year of Tamang people
- Lhosar, new year of Tibet
