= Tirhuta calendar =

Calendar followed by the Maithils

Tirhuta Panchang (Devanagari: तिरहुता पंचांग, Tirhuta: 𑒞𑒱𑒩𑒯𑒳𑒞𑒰 𑒣𑓀𑒔𑒰𑓀𑒑, IPA: Tirhutā pan̄cāṅg) is a calendar followed by the Maithili community of India and Nepal. This calendar is one of the many Hindu calendars. It is a tropical solar Hindu calendar in which the year begins on the first day of Baishakh month i.e. Mesh Sankranti. Every year, this day falls on 13/14 April of the Gregorian Calendar

== Months ==
Names of Maithili months :Maithili Calendar

No.	Name	Pronunciation	Colloquial	Gregorian Months
1	वैशाख	Baiśākha	बैसाख	April/May
2	ज्येष्ठ	Jyeṣṭha	जेठ	May/June
3	आषाढ़	Āshāḍha	अखार	June/July
4	श्रावण	Śrāvaṇa	साओन	July/August
5	भाद्र	Bhādra	भादो	August/September
6	आश्विन	Āśvina	आसिन	September/October
7	कार्तिक	Kārtika	कातिक	October/November
8	मार्गशीर्ष (अग्रहायण)	Mārgaśīrṣa	अगहन	November/December
9	पौष	Pauṣa	पूस	December/January
10	माघ	Māgha	माघ	January/February
11	फाल्गुन	Phālguna	फागुन	February/March
12	चैत्र	Chaitra	चैत	March/April

== Months and their corresponding season ==
तिरहुता पञ्चाङ्ग (Maithili calendar)

मास Month	ऋतु Season
ज्येष्ठ/Jyeshtha; May–June	ग्रीष्म; Summer
आषाढ़/Asharha; June–July	ग्रीष्म; Summer
श्रावण/Shrabana; July–August	वर्षा Monsoon
भाद्र/Bhadra; August–September	वर्षा Monsoon
आश्विन/Ashvina; September–October	शरद; Autumn
कार्तिक/Kartika; October–November	शरद; Autumn
मार्गशीर्ष/Margashirsha; November–December	हेमन्त; Pre-winter
पौष/Pausha; December–January	हेमन्त; Pre-winter
माघ/Magha; January–February	शिशिर; Winter
फाल्गुन/Falguna; February–March	शिशिर; Winter
चैत्र/Chaitra; March–April	वसन्त; Spring
वैशाख/Baishakh; April–May	वसन्त; Spring

=== Baishakha-Jyeshtha-Asharha ===
These three months are the summer season in Mithila. Jeth and Asarh are very hot. Baisakh is the month of growing lychee. Jeth and Asarh are the months of growing mangoes.

=== Shrabana-Bhadra ===
Mithila receives heavy rainfall during these two months, often resulting in flooding. Farmers wait for the season's first rain so they can sow paddy in their fields. The holy month of Saon is devoted to Lord Shiva. Devotees visit Baidnath Dham in Deoghar to offer gangajal.

=== Ashvina-Kartika ===
These two months have moderate weather, and both represent the festive season for Mithila. Navaratra falls in Asin; Diwali and Chhath fall in Katik. Moreover, Katik is the harvesting month for farmers.

=== Margashirsha-Pausha-Magha ===
Margashirsha, Pausha and Magh are the winter seasons in Mithila. Out of these three, Pausha and Magh are the extreme winter periods, when the temperature sometimes falls to 5 °C. Makar Sankranti falls in the month of Pausha, and Basant Panchami in Magh.

=== Falguna-Chaitra ===
After winter, Falgun and Chaitra are the moderate months. Fagun and Chait again are the harvesting months. Holi falls in Fagun and Chhath falls in Chait. Chaith is the last month of the Maithili calendar.

== Days in Maithili calendar ==
Like, most of the calendars of the world, Maithili calendar also has 7 days in a week, each of 24-hour length. Rabibasar or Sunday is supposed to be the first day of the week.

- Rabibasar / Sunday : रविवासर
- Somabasar / Monday : सोमवासर
- Mangaldin / Tuesday : मंगलवासर
- Budhbasar / Wednesday: बुधवासर
- Brihaspatibasar / Thursday : बृहस्पतीवासर
- Shukrabasar / Friday: शुक्रवासर
- Shanibasar / Saturday : शनिवासर

== Significance ==
The Maithili calendar is the calendar of Mithila which originated in Mithila region. The Maithili calendar is of great importance for Maithil people in India as well as in Nepal. All auspicious dates (e.g. marriage, Mundan, Upanayana sanskar) as well as the dates of Maithili festivals (e.g. Dipawali (Diwali/Tihar), Chhath, Durga Puja, Janaki Navami) are set based on the Maithili calendar. It has deep roots in the Hindu religion and Mithila's culture.

== Related calendars ==
The Maithili calendar is related to the Hindu solar calendar, which is itself based on the Surya Siddhanta. The Hindu solar calendar also starts in mid-April, and the first day of the calendar is celebrated as the traditional New Year in the Indian states of Assam, West Bengal, Kerala, Manipur, Orissa, Punjab, Tamil Nadu, and Tripura. Bangladesh, Nepal, Thailand and Sri Lanka also celebrate new year around the same time (13–15 April). This day is also known as Mesha Shankranti.

== See also ==
- Mithila
- Tirhut
- Tirhuta script
- Maithili language
- Jur Sital (Maithili New Year)
- Muzaffarpur
- Vidyapati
