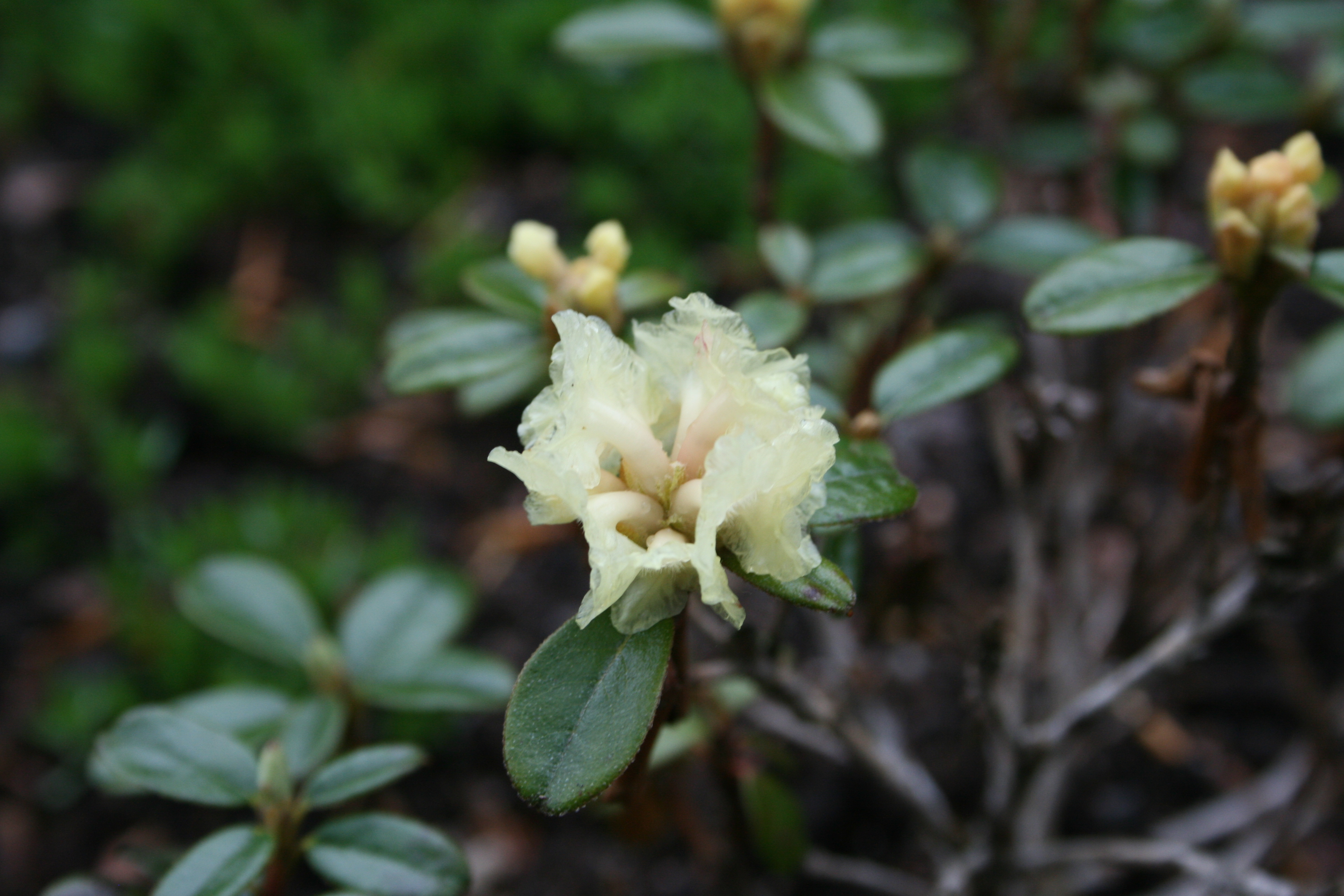
- Rhododendron anthopogon subsp. hypenanthum 'Annapurna' cultivar

Scientific classification
- Kingdom: Plantae
- Clade: Embryophytes
- Clade: Tracheophytes
- Clade: Spermatophytes
- Clade: Angiosperms
- Clade: Eudicots
- Clade: Asterids
- Order: Ericales
- Family: Ericaceae
- Genus: Rhododendron
- Species: R. anthopogon

Binomial name
- Rhododendron anthopogon D.Don

Synonyms
- Rhododendron anthopogon var. album Davidian; Rhododendron anthopogon var. hypenanthum (Balf.f.) H.Hara; Rhododendron aromaticum Wall.; Rhododendron haemonium Balf.f. & R.E.Cooper

= Rhododendron anthopogon =

Species of flowering plant

Rhododendron anthopogon, the dwarf rhododendron, is a species of flowering plant in the family Ericaceae, native to Pakistan, the Himalayas, Tibet, and Myanmar. It is used to make an essential oil. Its habitats include open slopes, thickets, hillsides, and cliff ledges.

== Subtaxa ==
The following subspecies are accepted:

- Rhododendron anthopogon subsp. anthopogon – Himalayas, Tibet, Myanmar
- Rhododendron anthopogon subsp. hypenanthum (Balf.f.) Cullen – Pakistan, Himalayas, Tibet
