= Losoong Festival =

Celebration of the Sikkimese New Year

Losoong
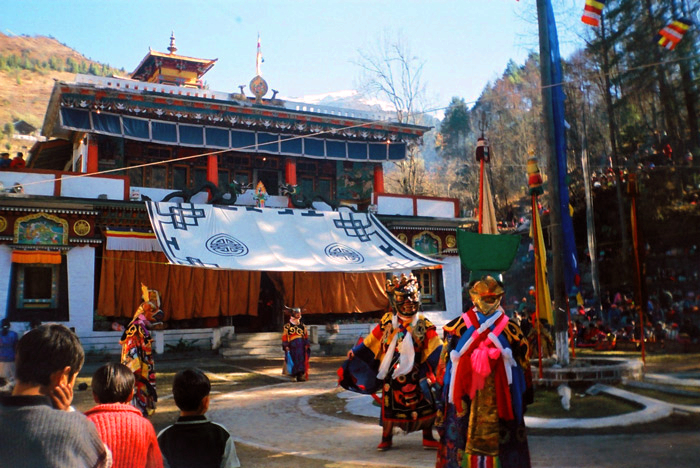
- A new year festival at Lachung monastery in North Sikkim
- Official name: Losoong
- Also called: Sonam Losoong (Bhutia), Namsoong (Lepcha)
- Observed by: Bhutias, Lepchas
- Significance: marks the beginning of the Sikkimese New Year and; commemorates the end of the harvest season
- Date: 1st day of the 11th month of the Tibetan lunar calendar.
- Duration: Several days
- Frequency: Annual
- Related to: Losar

Losoong is a traditional festival that marks the end of the harvest season, of the Bhutia tribe. It is celebrated every year in December.

== Tradition ==
Based on the Tibetan Lunar Calendar

- Losoong falls on the 1st day of the 11th month, when farmers celebrate the harvest.
- It is a traditional festival of the Bhutias. It is a time when the farmers rejoice and celebrate their harvest. The Lepchas also celebrate it and call it Namsoong. It is celebrated by inviting friends and family with traditional gaity and celebrations.
- The festival have been adapted from the traditions and rituals of the Tibetan New Year, Losar.
- The festival is preceded by masked dance at the Phodong and Rumtek Monasteries in Sikkim.

The dance forms performed in the festival depict narrativized tales from the life of Padmasambhava (or Guru Ugyen).

== Celebration ==
Celebration begins after the priest offers 'Chi-Fut', special alcohol, to the gods. After the offering to gods the effigy of the demon King is burnt. Burning the demon represents destroying the evil.

Certain competitions are organized and merrymaking lasts for several days. The festival is also called Sonam Losoong. Losoong festival is very famous in eastern India.
