= Phool Dei =

Festival of Uttarakhand, India

Phool Dei (also spelled Phooldei and known as Phool Sankranti or Phool Sangrad) is a traditional spring festival of the Indian state of Uttarakhand, observed in the Garhwal and Kumaon regions. It is held on the first day of the month of Chaitra, which coincides with Meen Sankranti and usually falls on 14 or 15 March. On the day, children known as Phulari place fresh spring flowers, and in some places rice, on the doorsteps of homes while singing folk songs that wish the household prosperity. The community welcomes the children with blessings and small gifts. In some areas the celebration lasts only a day, while elsewhere it continues for a week or a month.

== Etymology ==
The festival has several local names. In Garhwal it is commonly called Phool Sangrad or Phool Sankranti, while in Kumaon it is known as Phooldei; the children who take part are called Phulari (also spelled Fulari). Other names include Chhamma Dei, Daini Dwar and Chaitra Sankranti. In the Jaunsar area it is reported to be known as Goga. Because of its close association with children, one source also describes it as Lok Bal Parv ("people's children's festival").

Explanations of the name vary. Phool means "flower" in Hindi and the regional languages. For Dei, one account says it refers to a ceremonial pudding served to everyone on the day,[4] while others connect it to the doorstep (dwar) on which the flowers are placed, as in the refrain of the traditional song. No single etymology is established in the sources consulted.
