= Nadipinayakanahalli =

- Village
- Location in Karnataka, India Nadipinayakanahalli (India)
- Coordinates: 13.302050°N 77.864700°E
- Country: India
- State: Karnataka
- District: Chikkaballapura
- Established: 19th century (1830–1880)
- Founder: Unknown
- Named for: Unknown

Government
  - Type: Democracy
  - Body: Grama Panchayath

Area
  - Total: 6–8 km^{2} (2.3–3.1 sq mi)
- Elevation: 893 m (2,930 ft)

Population (2012)
  - Total: 1,000−1,200
  - Density: 900/km^{2} (2,300/sq mi)

Languages
  - Official: Kannada
- Time zone: UTC+5:30 (IST)
- PIN: 562102
- Telephone code: 08158
- Vehicle registration: KA 40

Nadipinayakanahalli is a Kannada-speaking village in Sidlaghatta Taluk, Chikkaballapur District. It comes under Nagamangala gram panchayat in Chikkaballapura district.

== Geography ==
Nadipinayakanahalli is located 27 km south-east of Chikballapur, the district's headquarters, and 64 km from the state capital Bangalore. Surrounding cities and towns include Vijayapura to the west, Hoskote and Devanahalli to the south, and Sidlaghatta and Chintamani to the north.

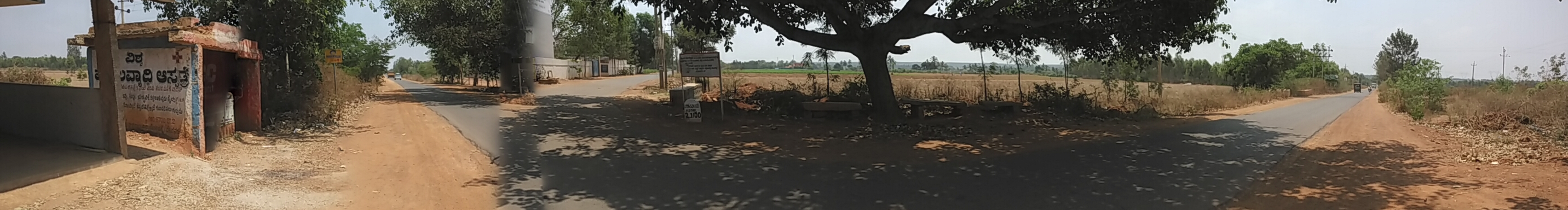
Nadipinayakanahalli Panorama

== Demographics ==
The population of the village ranges from 1000 to 1200. Most of the village inhabitants are farmers and are lower middle class. The literacy rate is above 80% thanks to the successful implementation of schemes such as Sarva Shiksha Abhiyan and illiteracy eradication schemes. Most of the village children attend Navodaya school, a government-run school located in the village. Others attend schools in Jangamakote Cross, near Jangamakote, and Vijayapura.

== Occupation ==
Sericulture and agriculture are the two major occupations, with 90% of the working population rearing silkworms. Men in this area are famously hard working. Ragi is the main crop during the rainy season. Edible fruits and vegetables such as beetroot, carrot, cabbage, grapes, potato, mango, banana, cucumber, watermelon, cashew nuts, papaya, jack fruit, and jambu are also farmed. Mulberry plants are prolific in the village.

Water is scarce in Nadipinayakanahalli. Village inhabitants have invested in bore wells, and agricultural land has been converted to drought land because of the scarcity of water. Drip irrigation is commonly used to water plants.

The lake at the end of the village covers an area of approximately 150 to 250 acres. The lake partially fills during the rainy season when rain water is collected, but is drained within days. Desperate farmers cultivate the land during the rainy season to produce ragi. This practice is strictly prohibited by the state government.

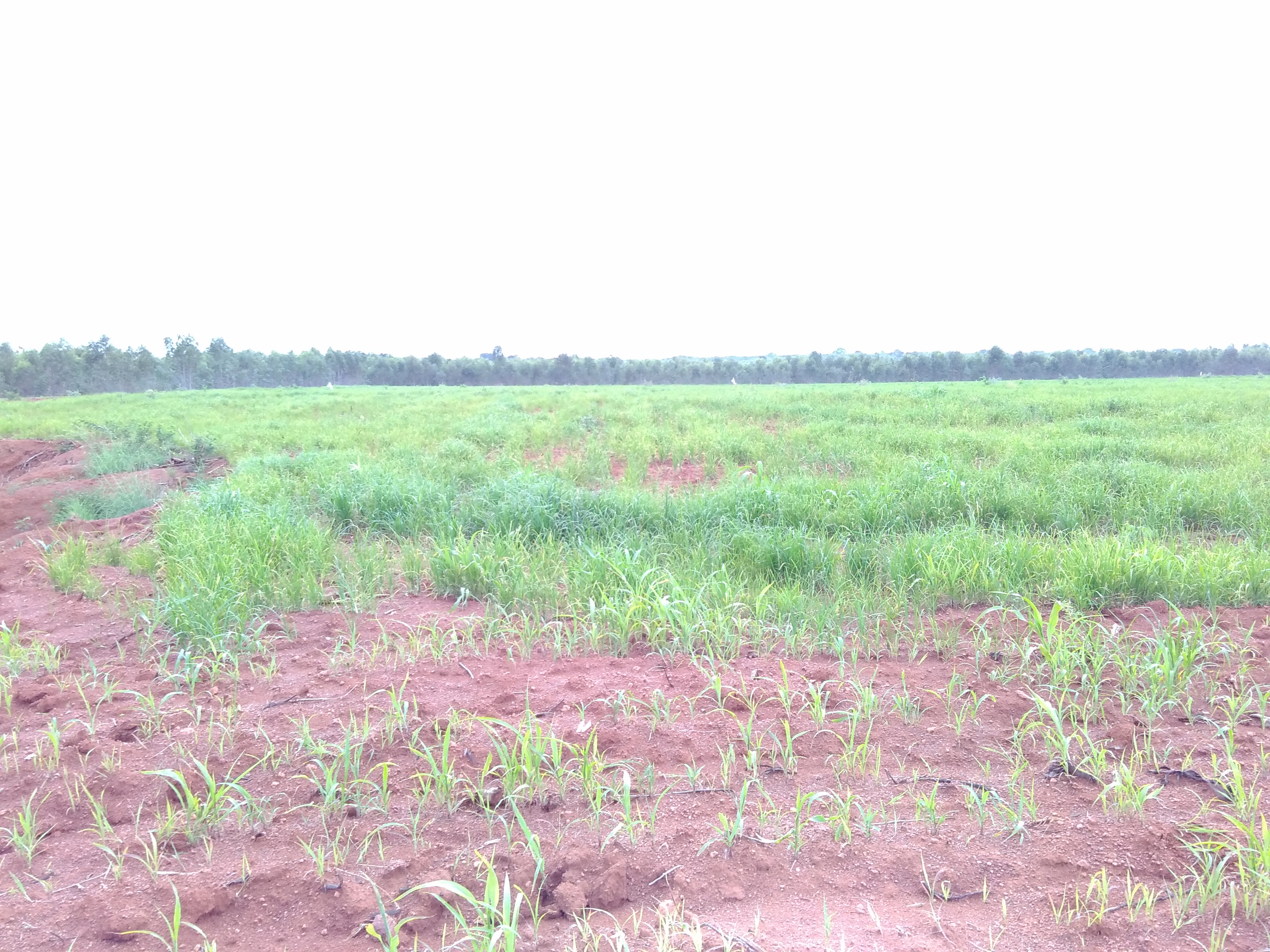
ರಾಗಿ ಬೆಳೆಯ ಪೈರು

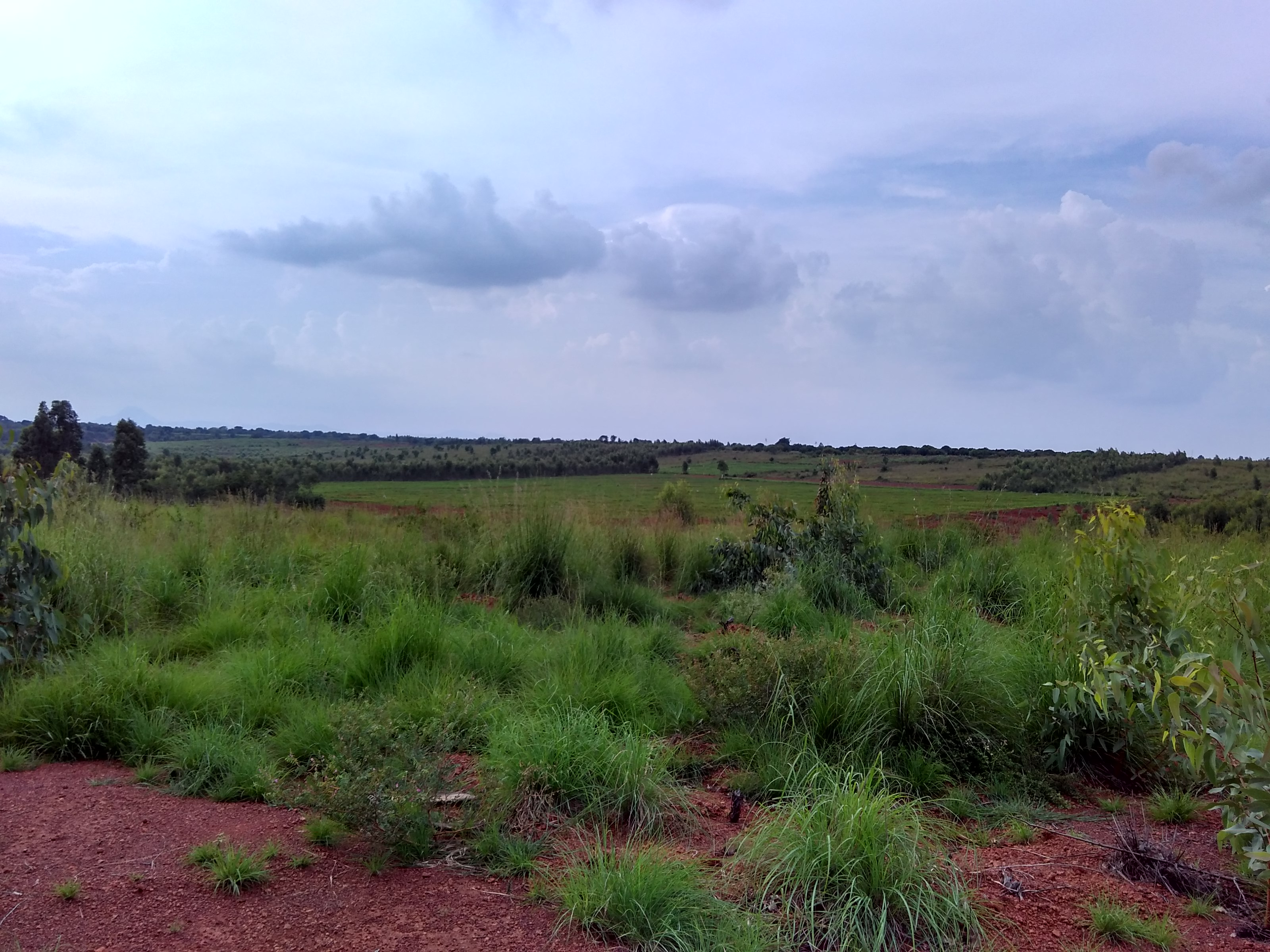
View of Ragi crops plantation from the peaks of the village

== Domestic life ==
Dairy farming (cattle rearing) is widely practiced and is a secondary source of income for average middle-class families. Two non-indigenous breeds, Holstein Frisian and Jersey, are favored because of their high production of milk. Indigenous (desi) cows like hallikar are disappearing as farmers rely on tractors for the cultivation of the land. The number of hallikar cows in the village has fallen from several hundred to under ten, due to lack of food. Cows are worshiped yearly during the Sankranthi festival.

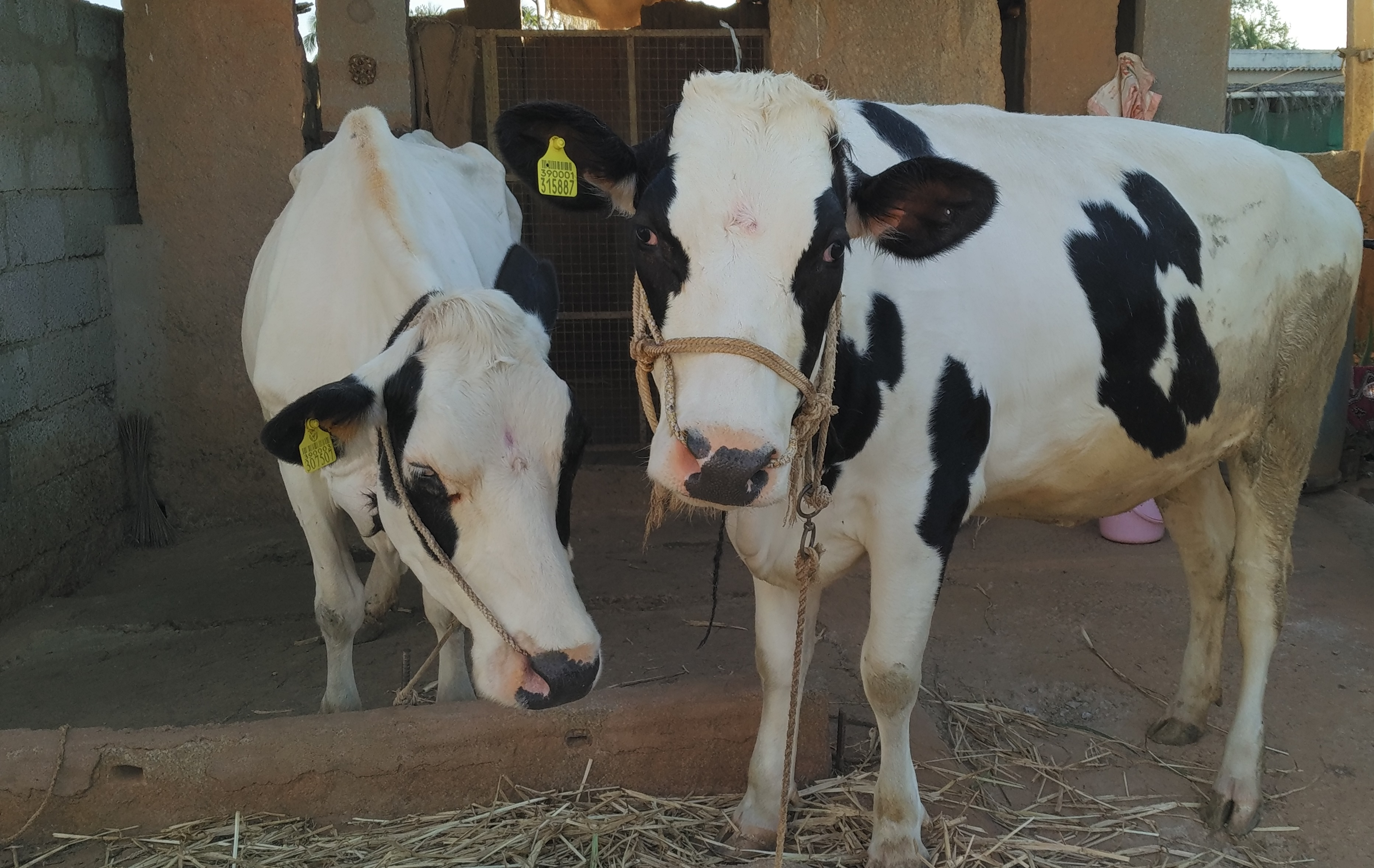
Lakshmi and Gowri

Dogs play a prominent role in Nadipinayakanahalli. Dog ownership is high because of the belief that dogs are loving, affectionate and protective. They often accompany villagers when gardening and during routine walks.

There are rare encounters between humans and snakes. Cobras sometimes enter houses looking for prey such as rats, frogs and hens. Snake bites are often reported but are successfully treated at nearby hospitals.

== Transportation ==
Every family owns one or more vehicle, such as a bike, tractor or car. There is excellent road infrastructure. In addition to vehicle parking, cows, buffalo and goats are frequently tethered on the road frontage outside a home.

== Forest Area ==
The village is surrounded by dry forest towards the east. Eucalyptus, tamarind, sandalwood, teak and other trees are grown, as well as bamboo. Forest guards patrol the boundary regularly to prevent villagers from taking trees. Tree poles from eucalyptus are in demand as building material, leading to the possibility of illegal logging. There is a forest reserve where wild animals are abundant. Forestry activities contribute to ground water level depletion.

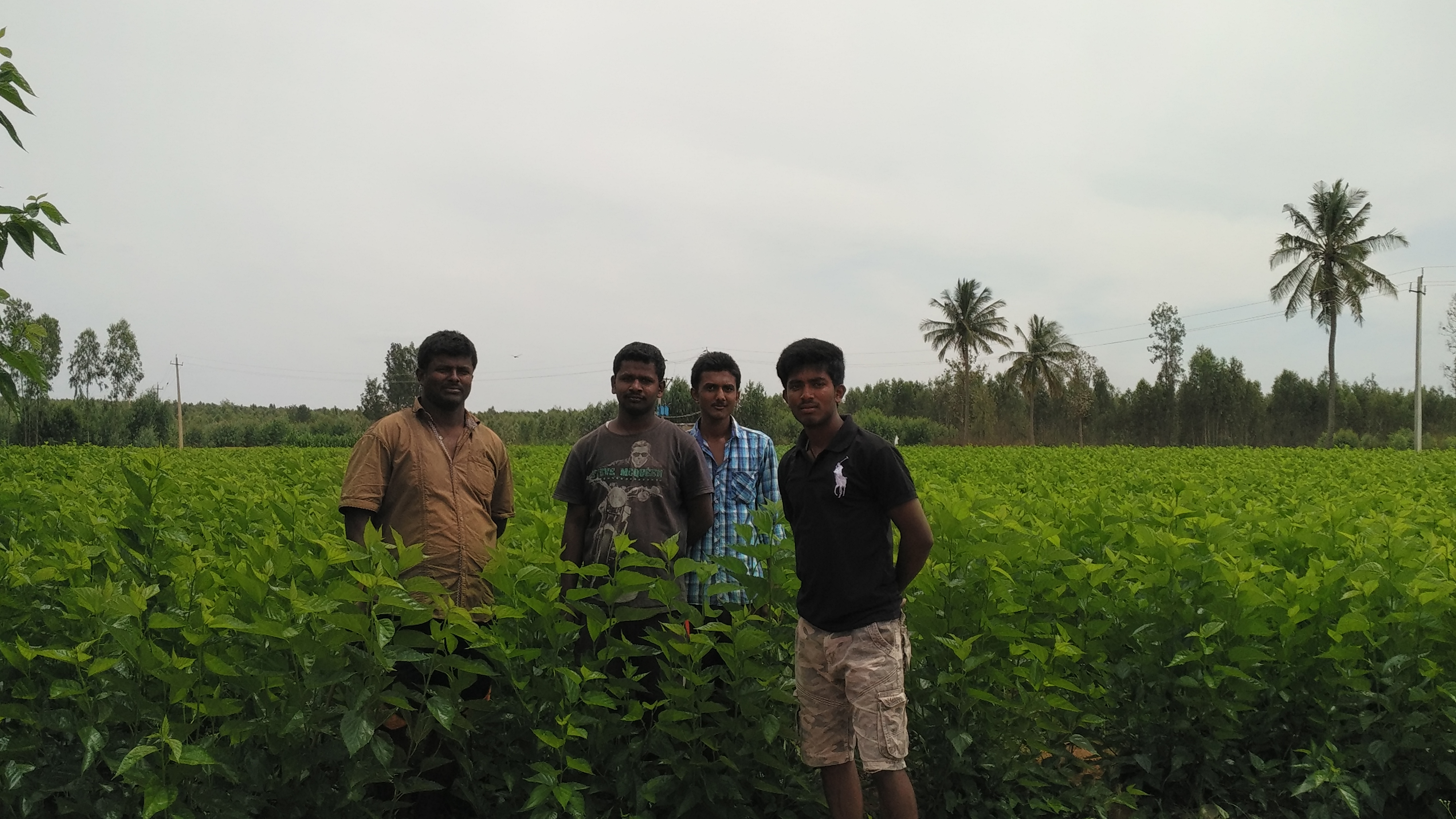
Villagers standing at the mid of mulberry plantation

== Sports ==
Cricket is popular in the village, with volleyball, and kabbadi also played occasionally.

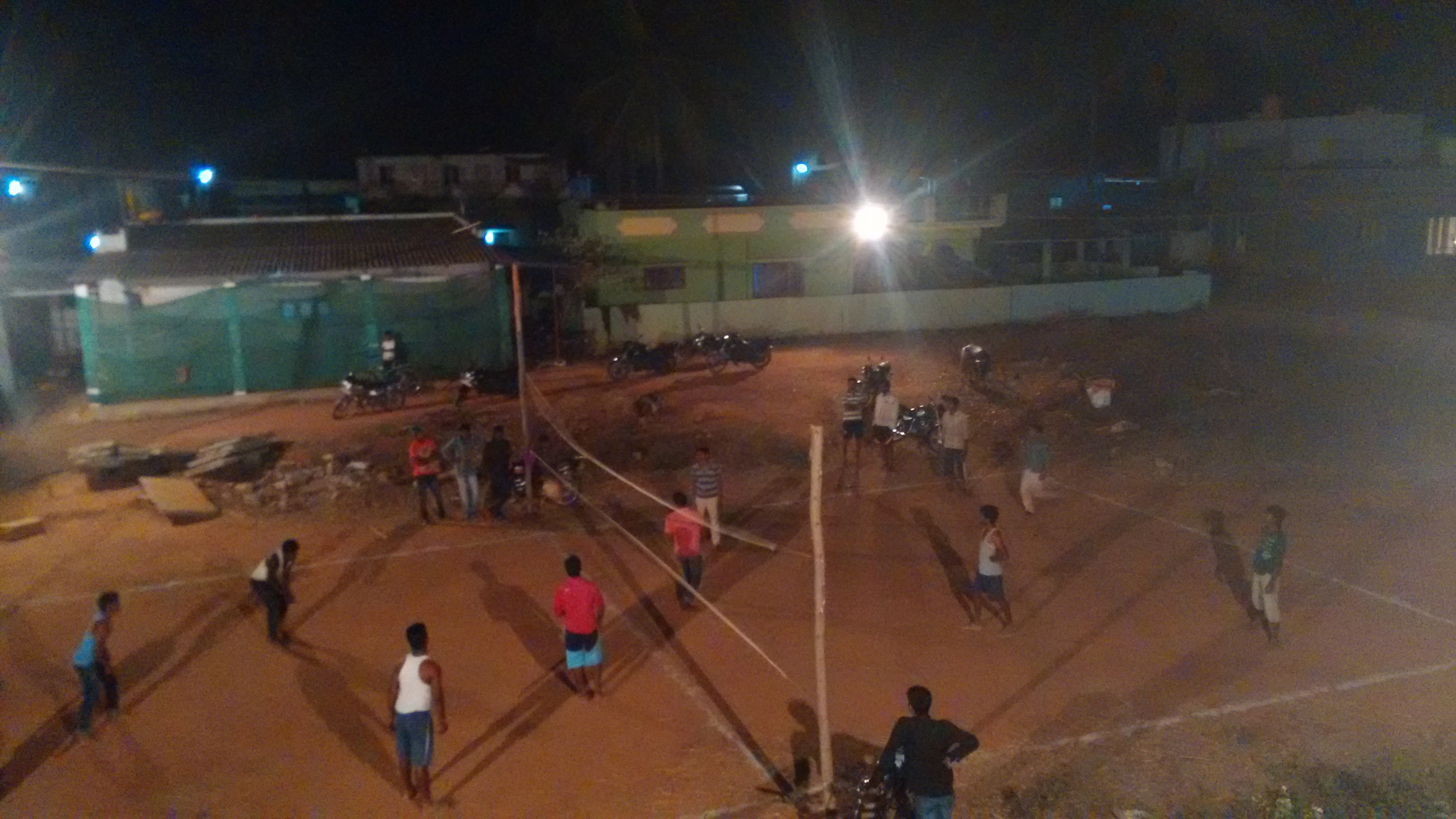
ವಾಲಿಬಾಲ್ ಆಟದ ವಿಹಂಗಮನ ನೋಟ

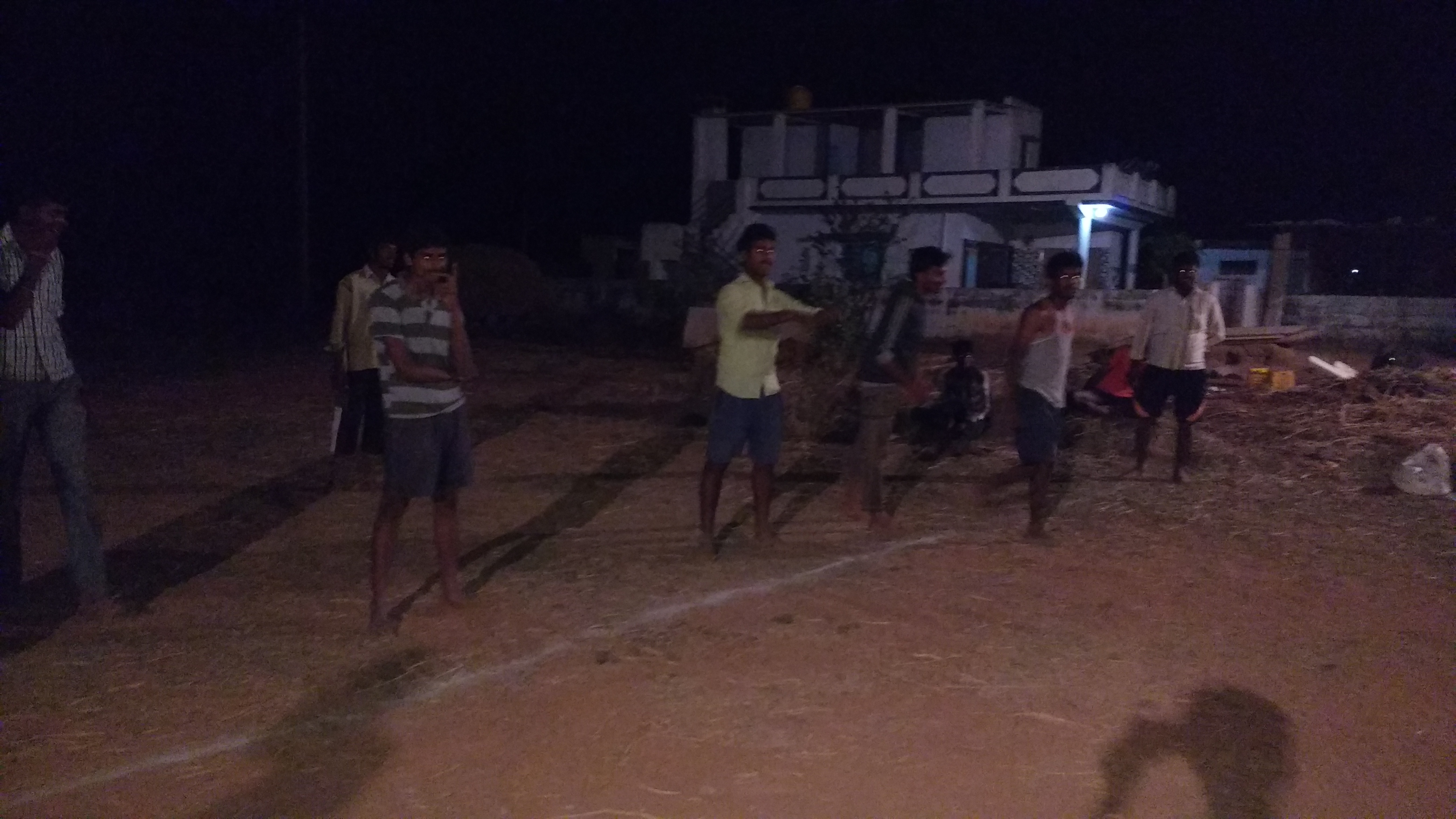
ಶಿವರಾತ್ರಿ ದಿನ ಕಬಡ್ಡಿ ಆಡುತ್ತಿರುವ ಯುವಕರು

== Village sights ==
There are several temples near the village, including temples to Hanuman, Gangamma, and Muneeswarar. Kaivara, the popular hill station is 10 km away via the forest road. There is a cave that was damaged by a landslide but is still visible. The Hanuman temple is also in poor condition.

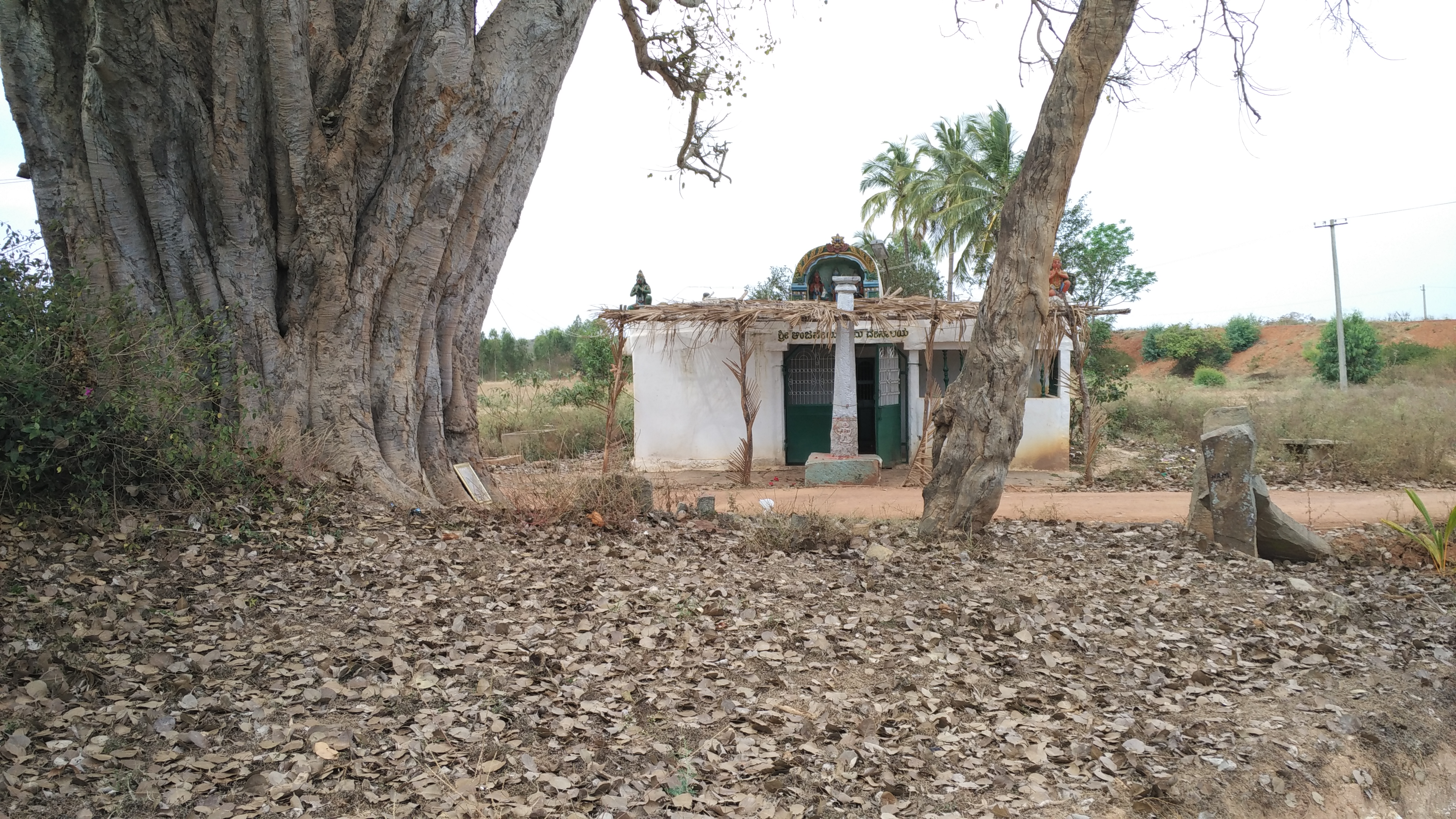
Anjaneya temple in Nadipinayakanahalli village (ನಡಿಪಿನಾಯಕನಹಳ್ಳಿ ಗ್ರಾಮದಲ್ಲಿ ಆಂಜನೇಯ ದೇವಸ್ಥಾನ)

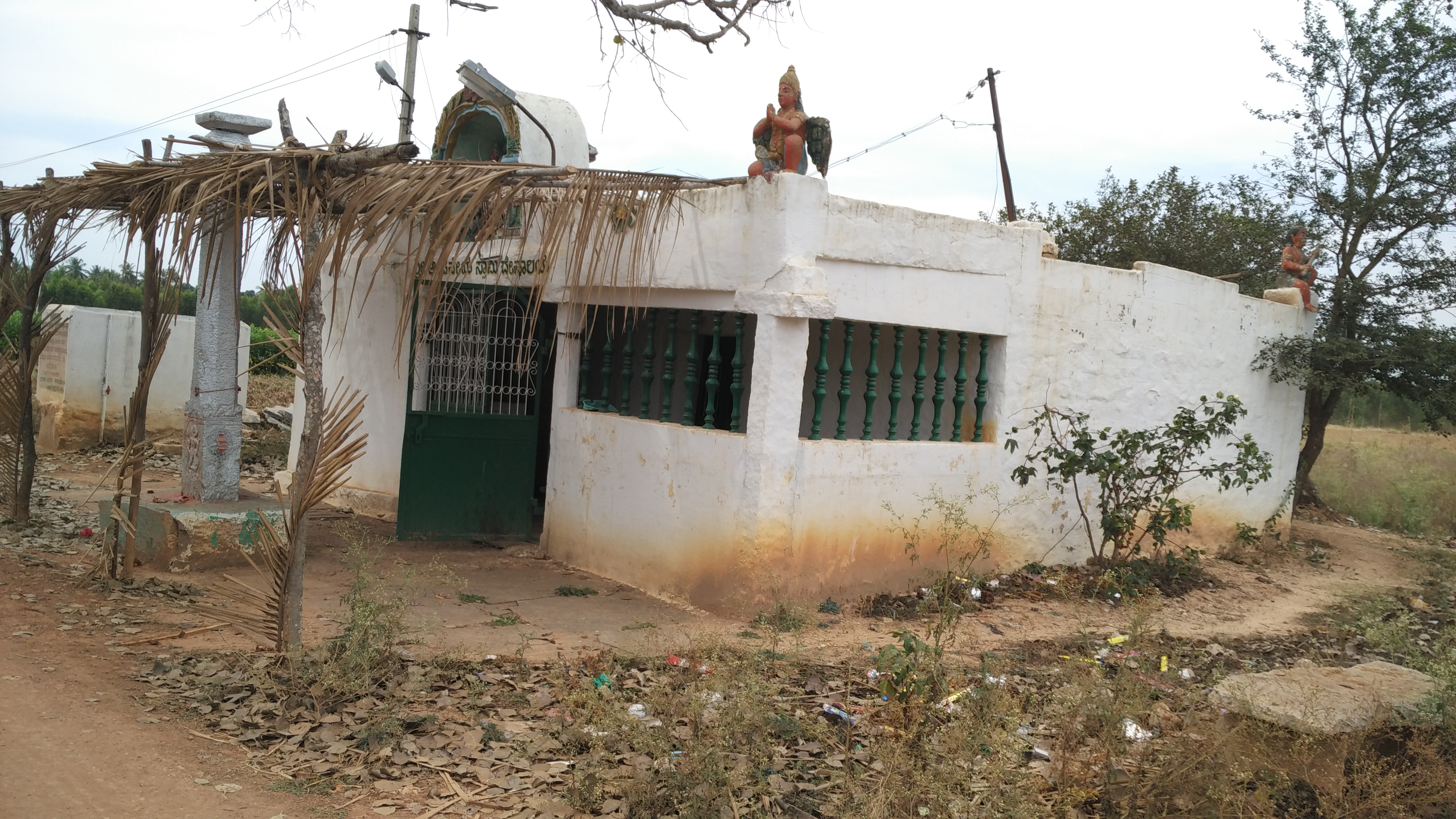
ಆಂಜನೇಯನ ದೇವಸ್ಥಾನ

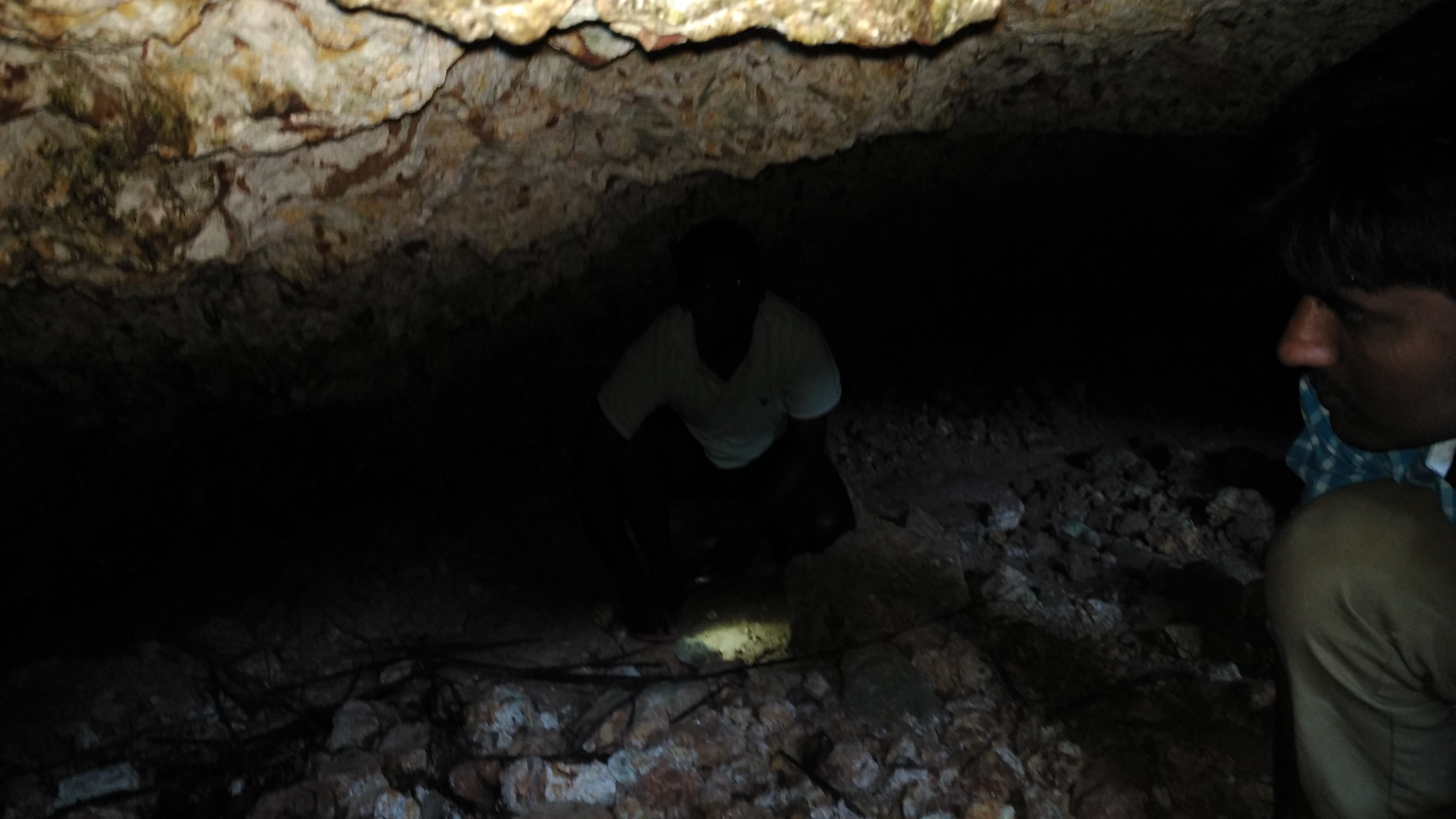
Inside view of Cave

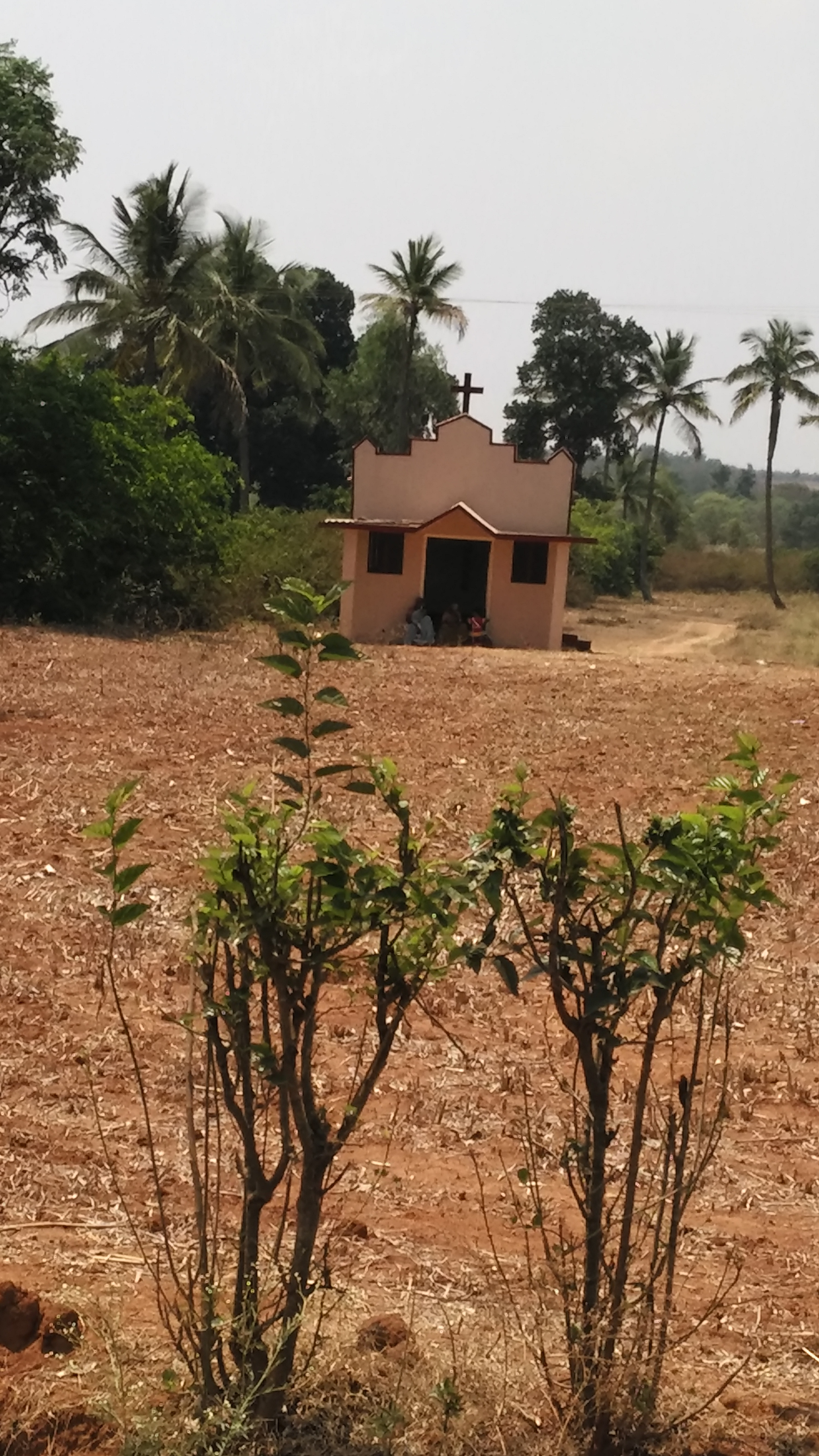
Church in the open field of Nadipinayakanahalli

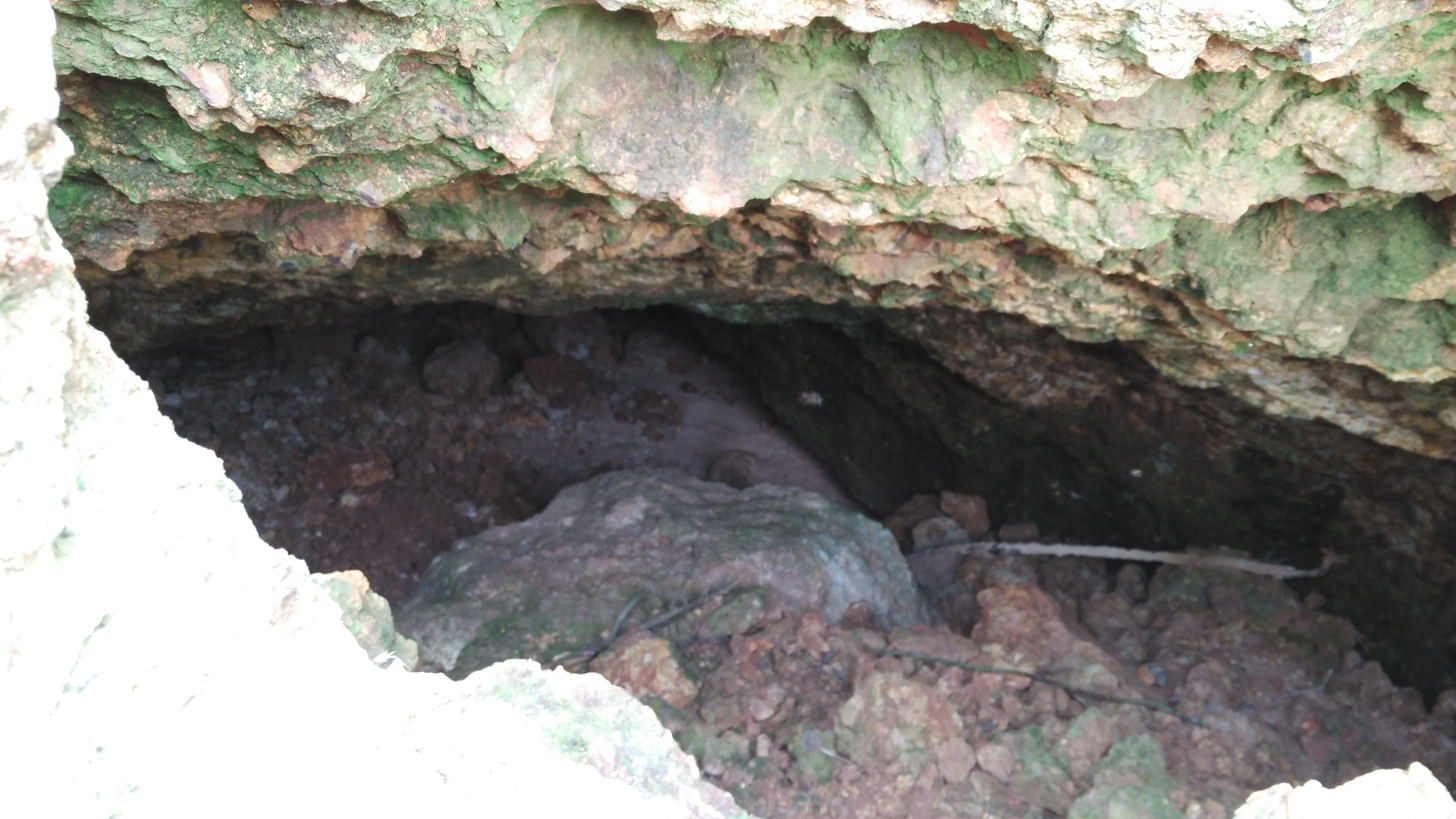
Vandalized cave

== Culture ==
Cultural events are held during Ganesh Chaturthi and Sankranthi. Fairs (ಜಾತ್ರೆ) are held every two years. Some villagers travel to religious destinations such as Tirupathi, Dharmasthala and the Nandi Hills.

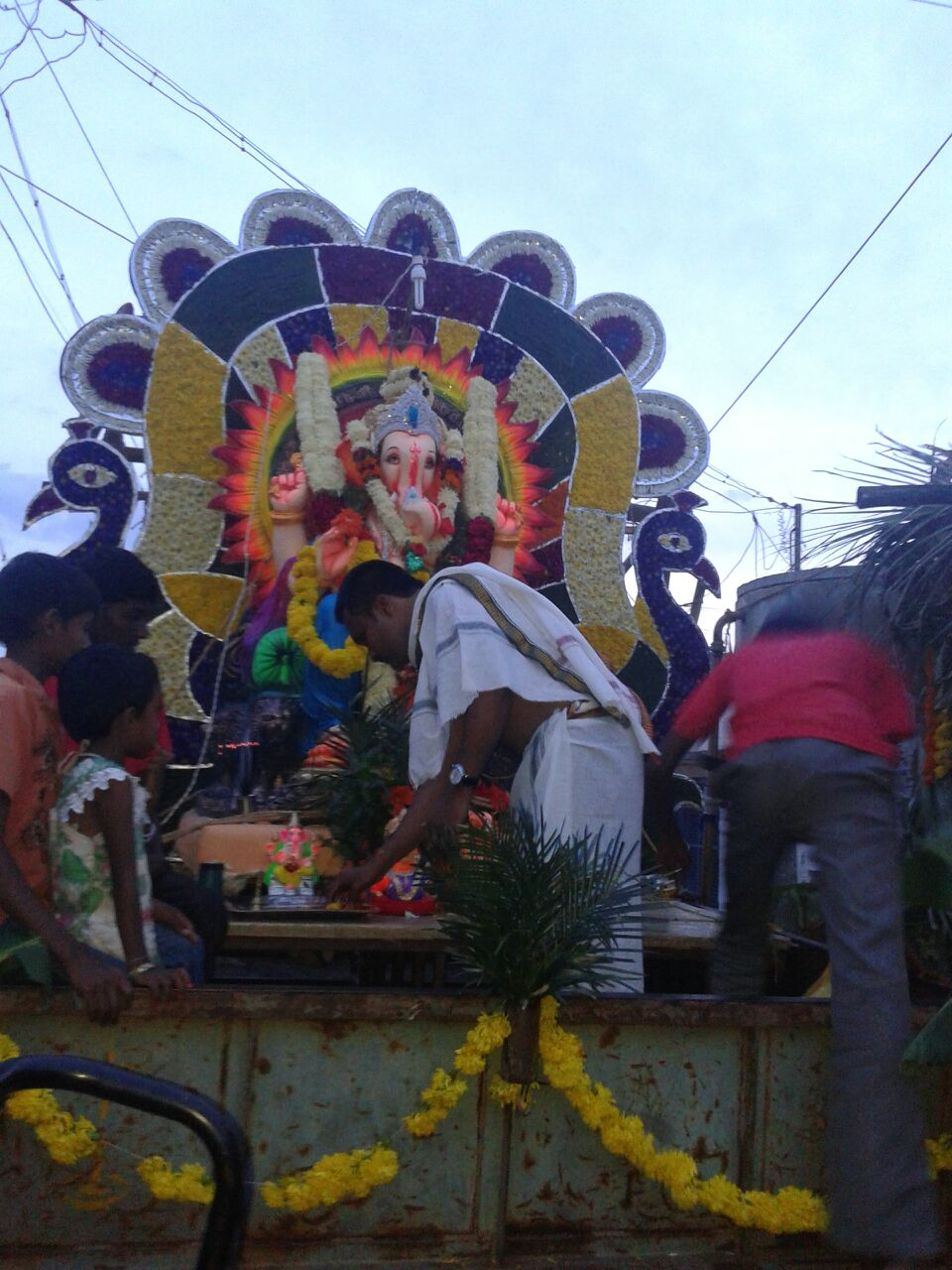
ಗಣೇಶನ ಮೆರವಣಿಗೆ.

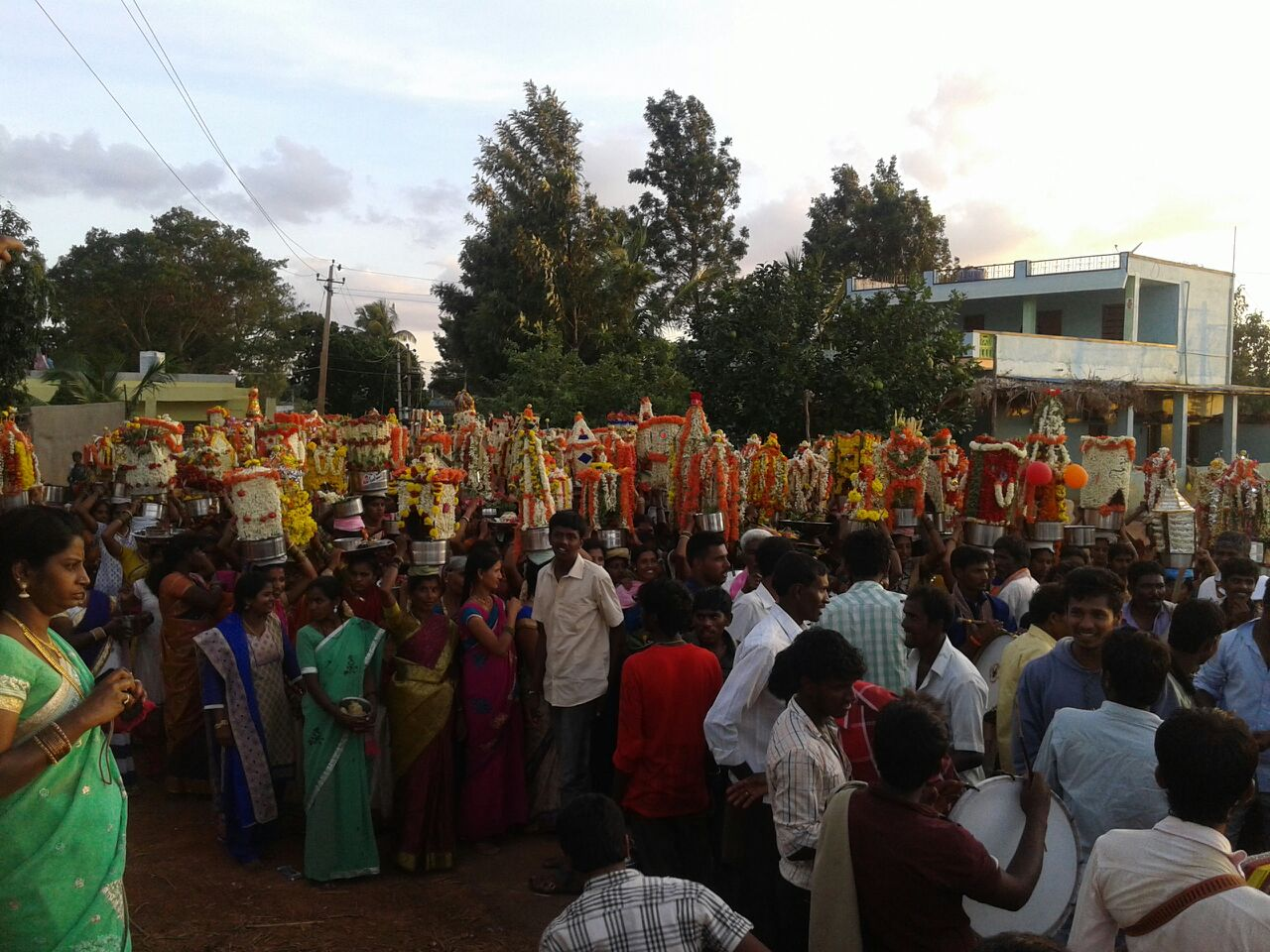
ಸಾಲು ಸಾಲಾಗಿ ಜಾತ್ರೆಯತ್ತ ಹೊರಟಿರುವ ಭಕ್ತಾದಿಗಳು.

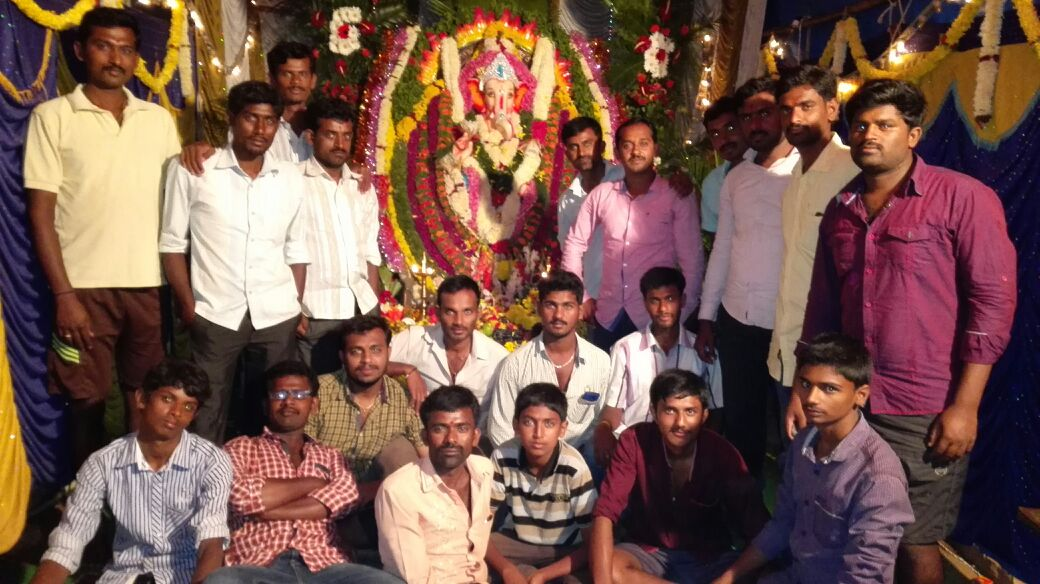
Group photo of Nadipinayakanahalli Youngsters.

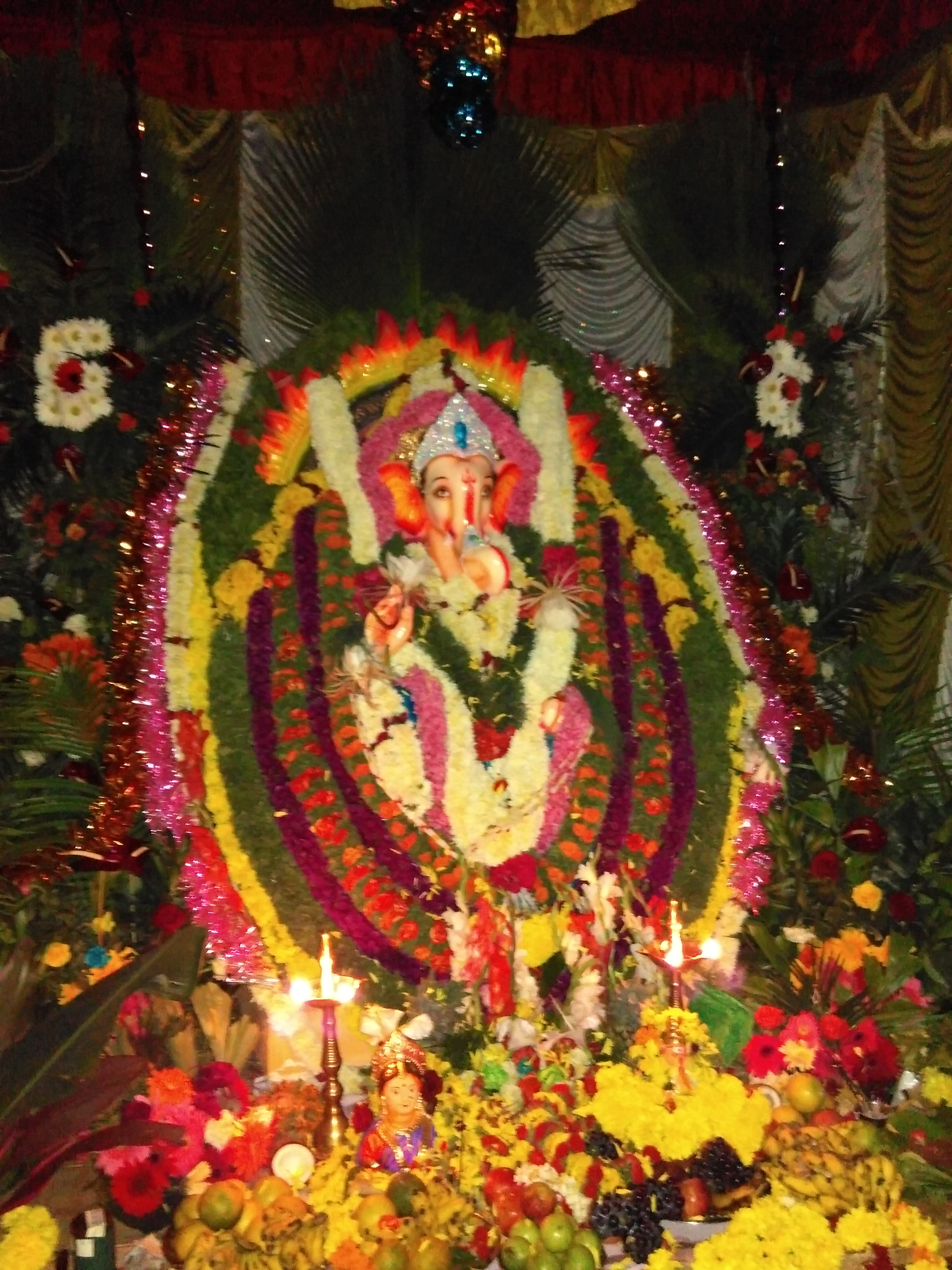
Ganesha Idol.

== Environmental issues ==
Depletion of ground water is a major challenge, with most bore wells having run dry. Rainfall is extremely low at 20 cm – 30 cm annually. A major reason for the water depletion is the absence of micro-irrigation systems and the intensive farming that occurred during the 1980s and 1990s. The state government has initiated the Gundia river/Yettinahole Project to bring new water to the district by diverting the west-flowing Nethravathi river to Chikkaballapura and Kolar, but the project has been delayed due to ecological concerns and protests.

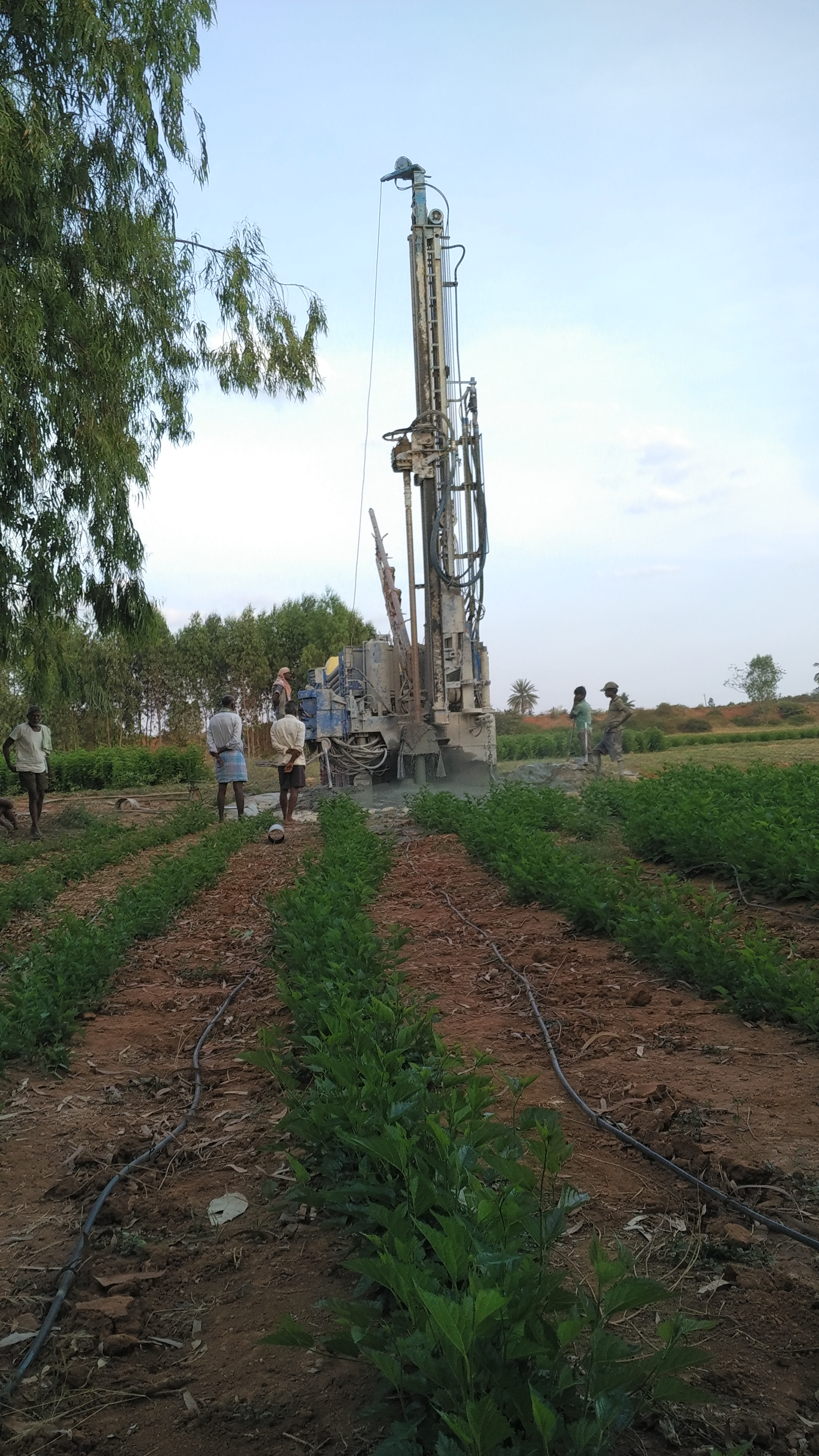
Men desperately watching for water while drilling borewell

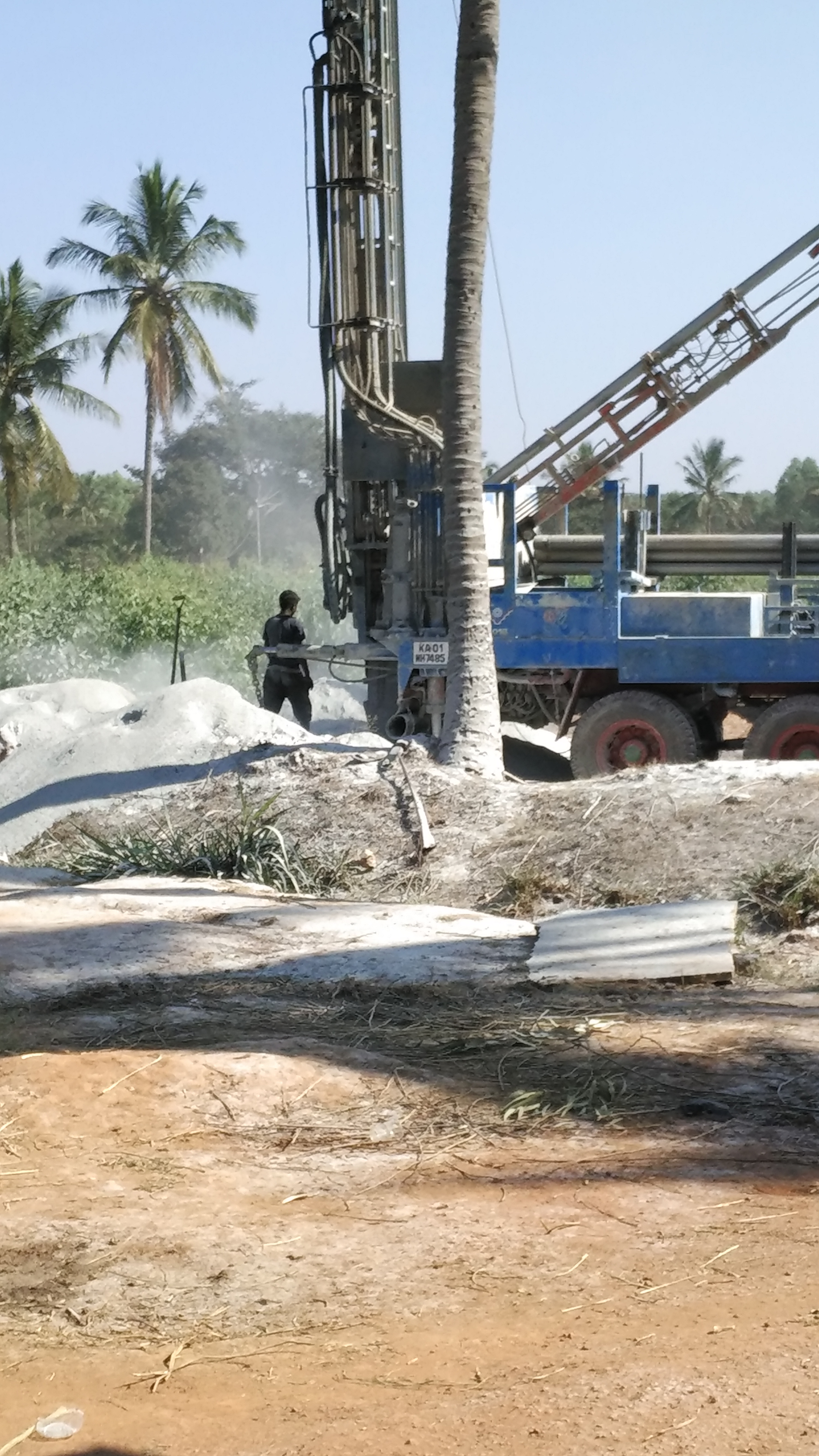
APC RIG drilling for ground water

== Criticisms ==
The village has a poor reputation for dirty caste politics and factionalism, and fights between villagers are frequent.

== Gallery ==
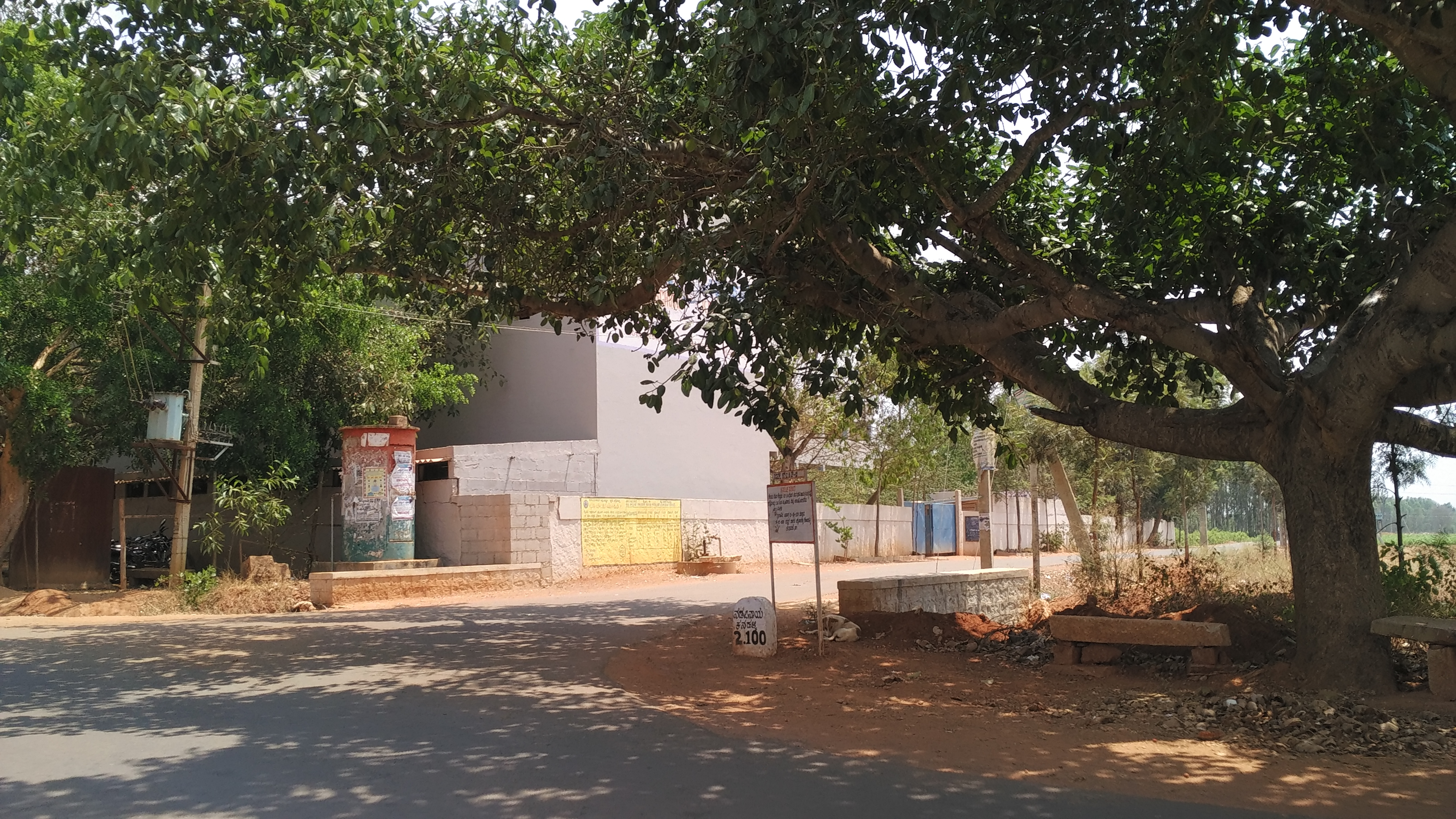
Nadipinayakanahalli entrance gate

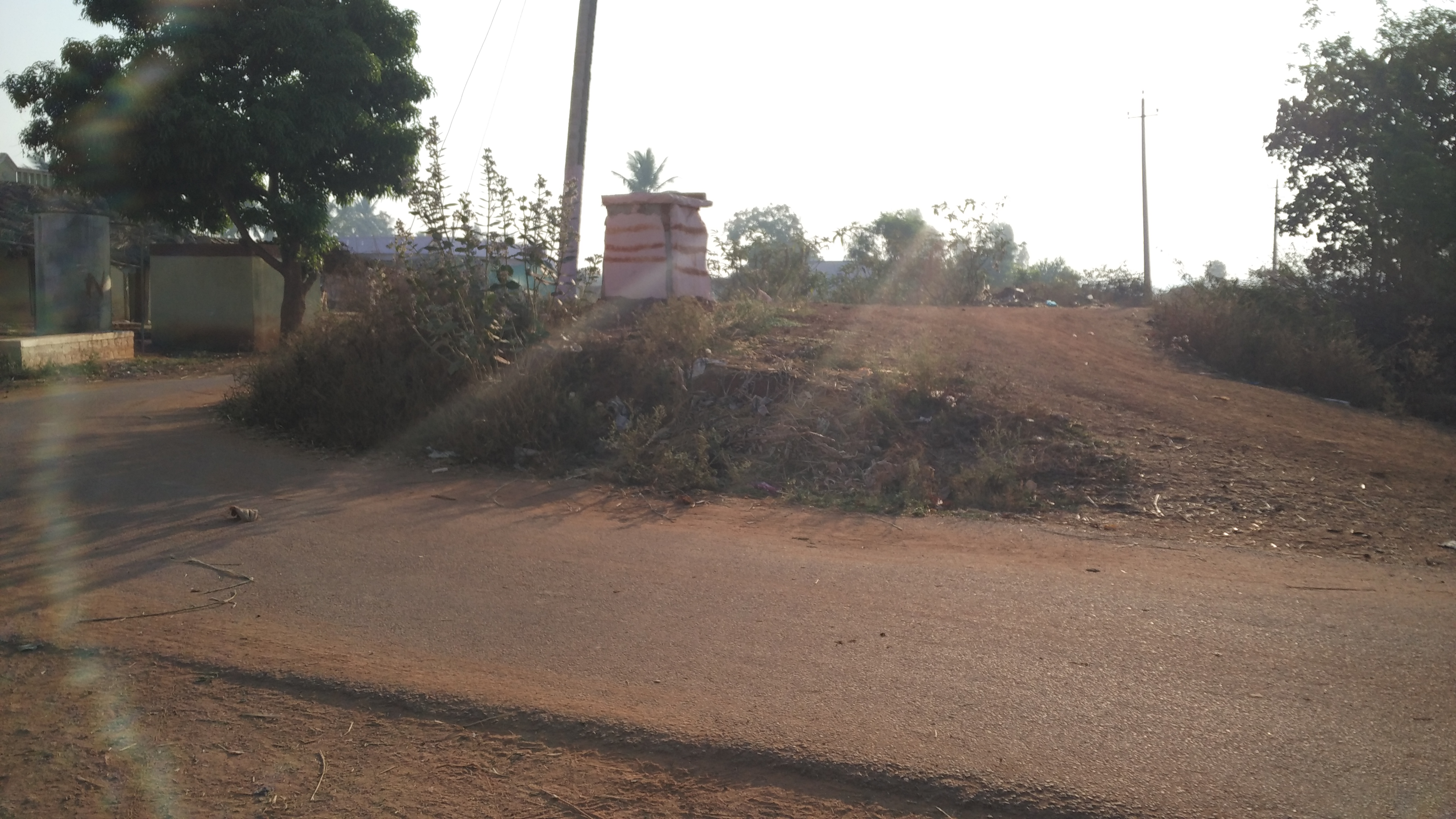
ಹಳ್ಳಿಯ ರಸ್ತೆ

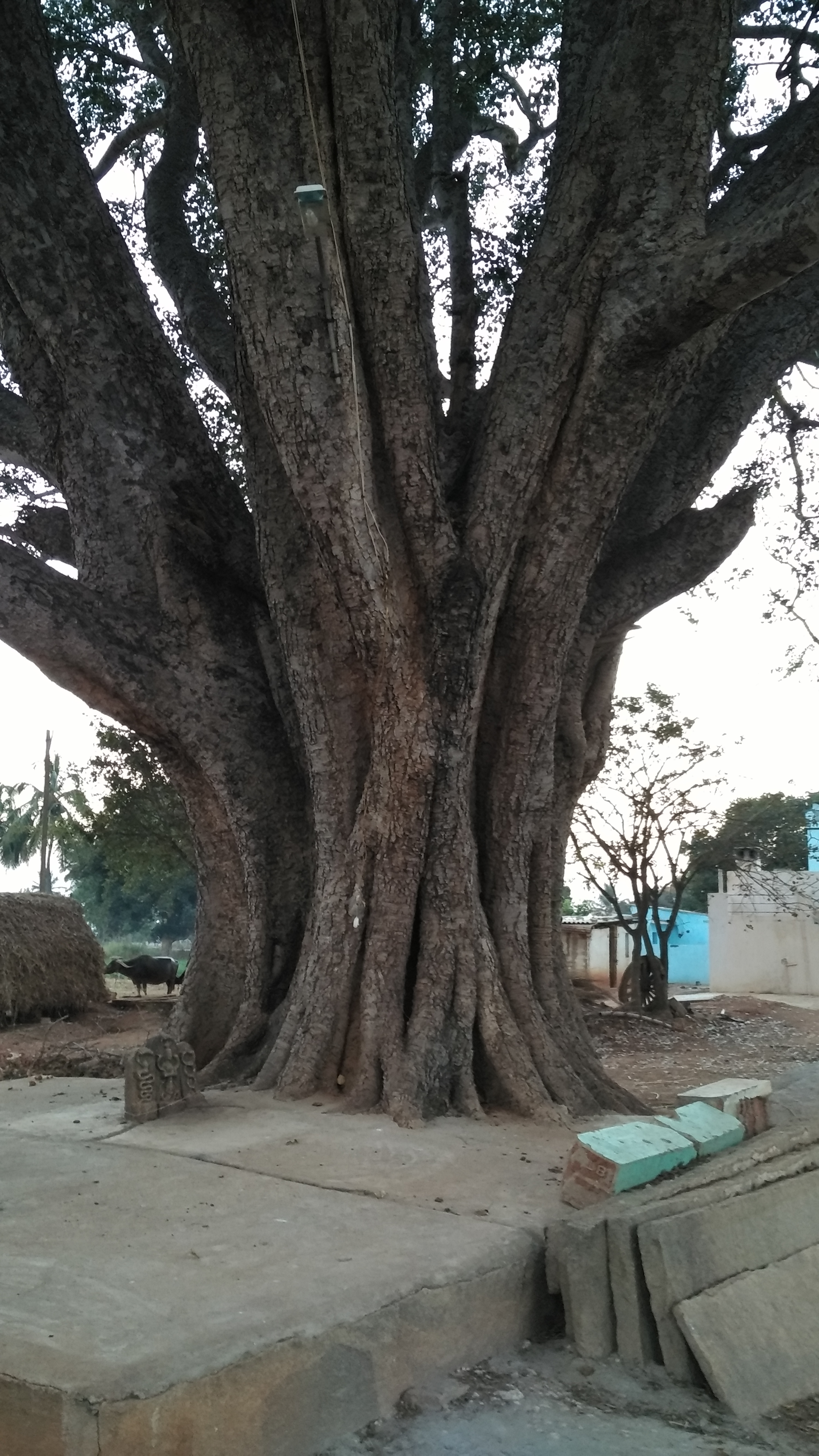
ಅಶ್ವಥ್ ಕಟ್ಟೆ

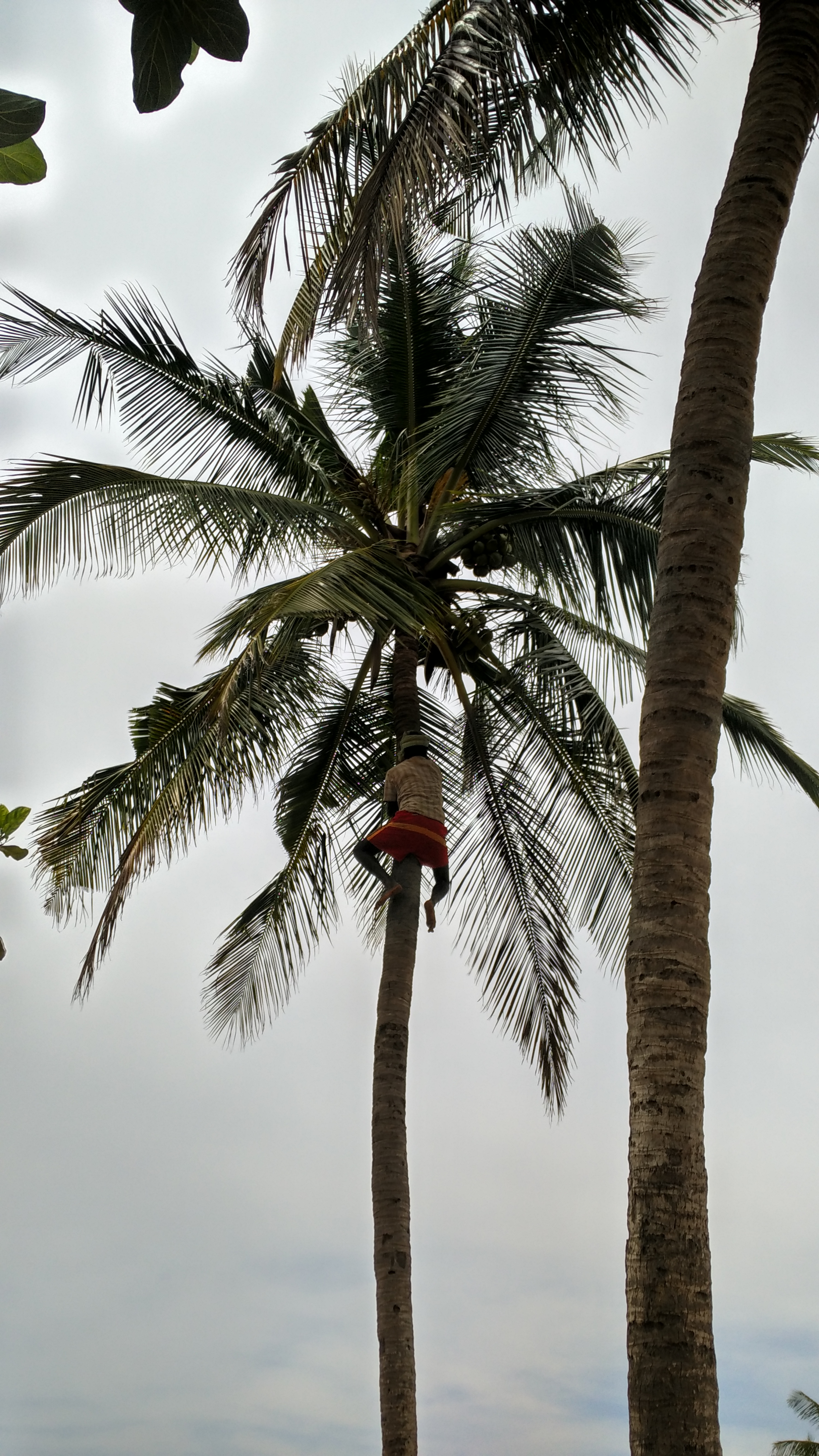
villager climbing Coconut tree

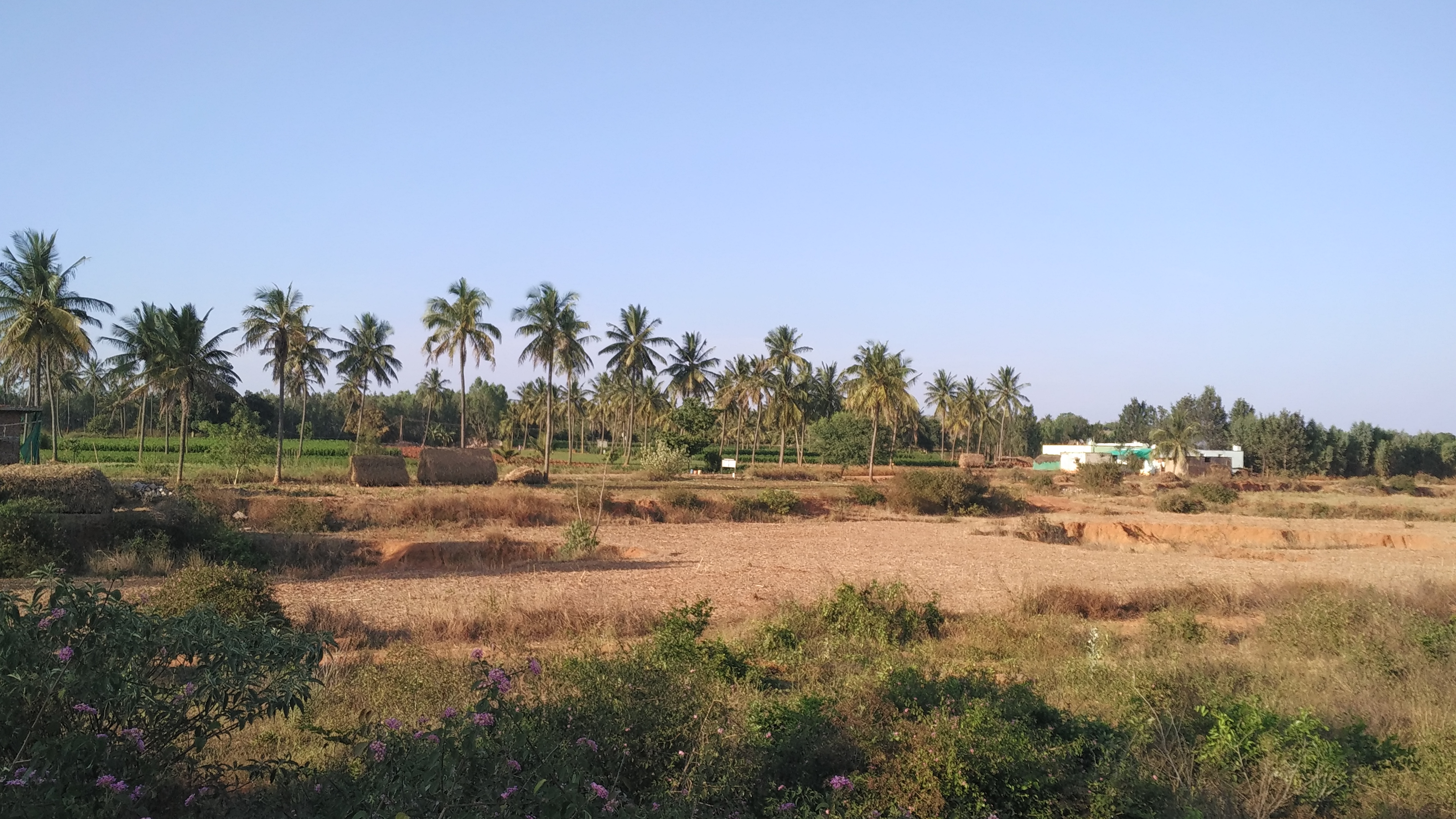
Dry lake view from Bridge

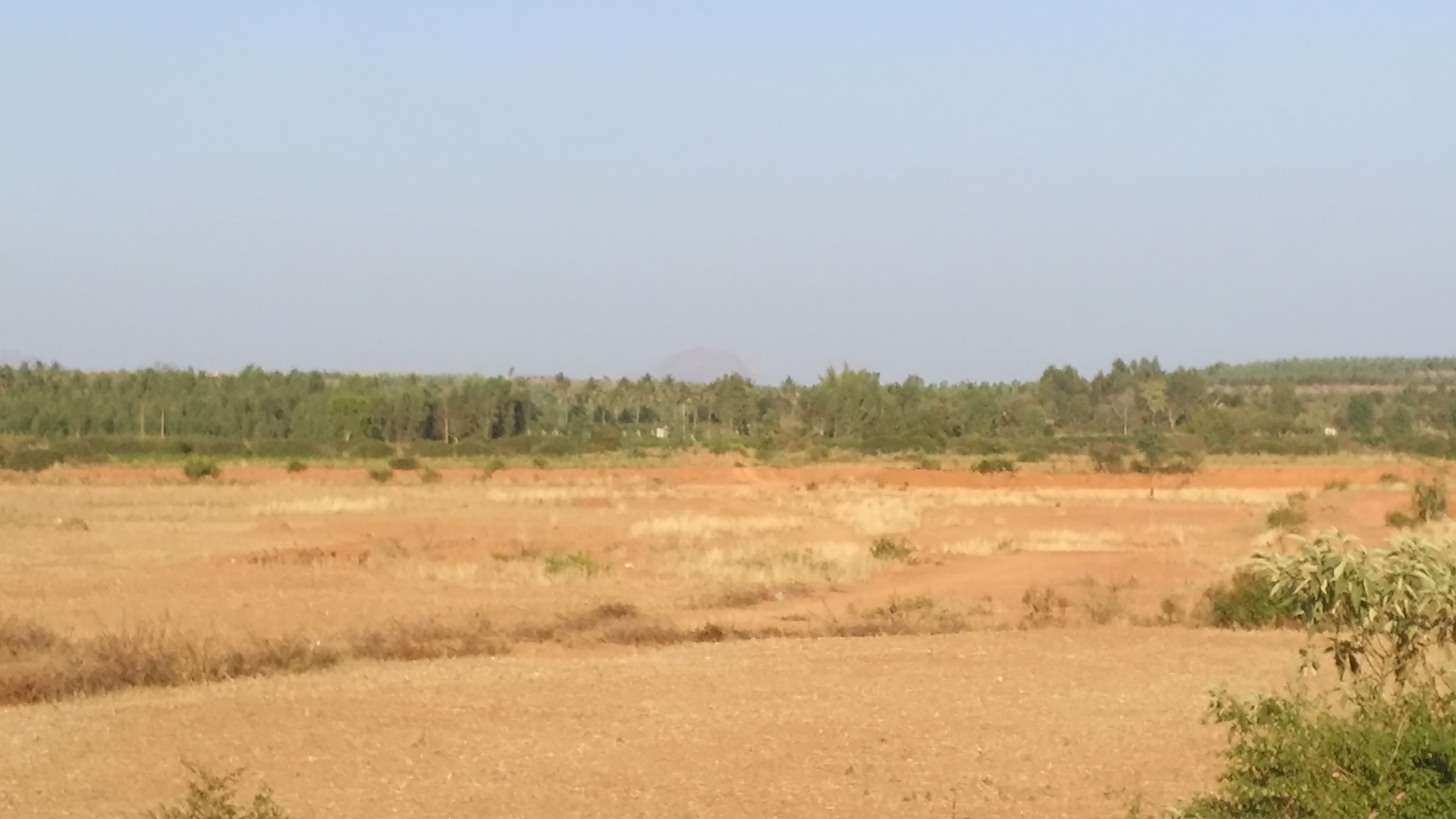
Dry field of lake

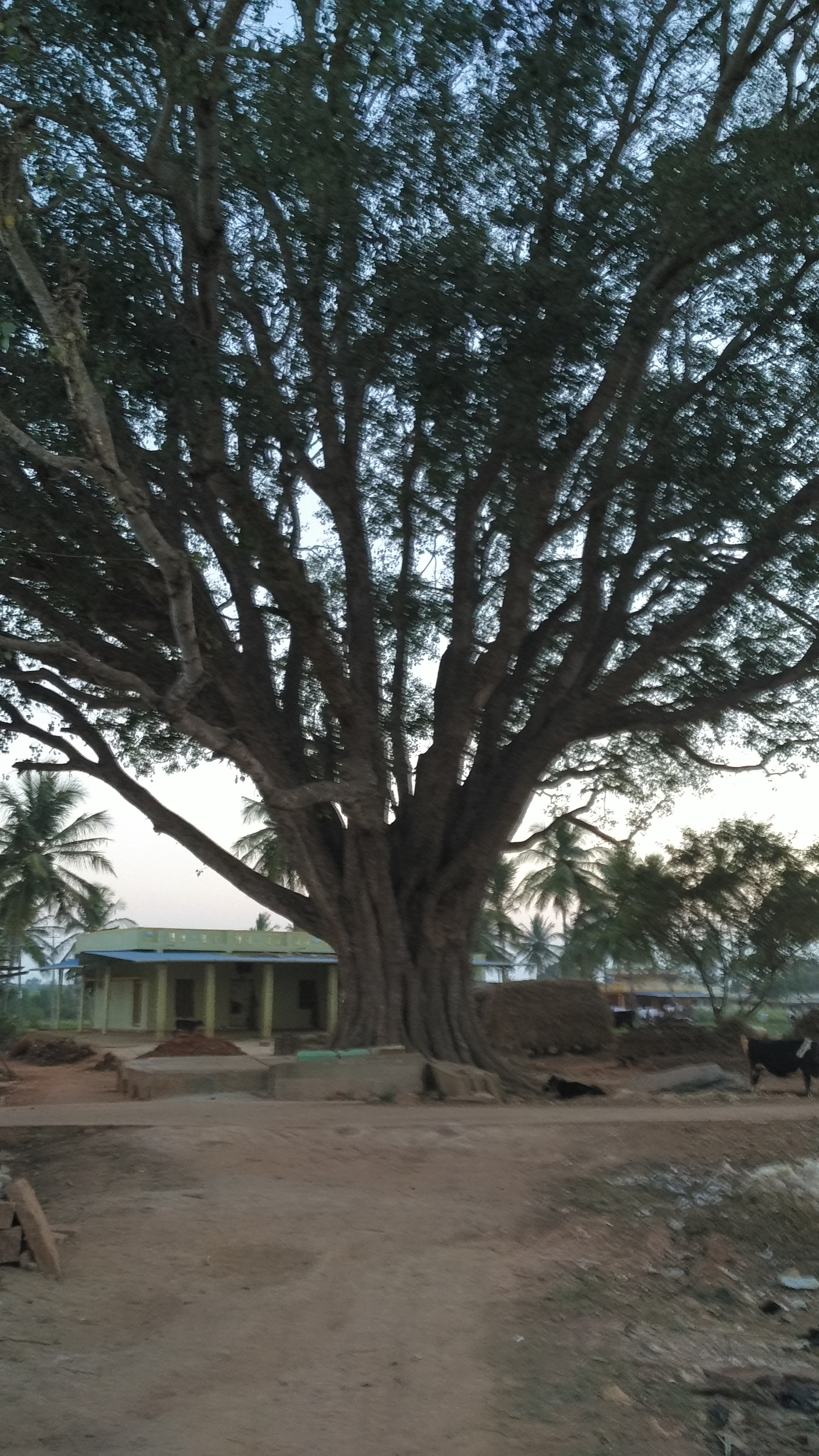
ರಾಗಿ ಮರ

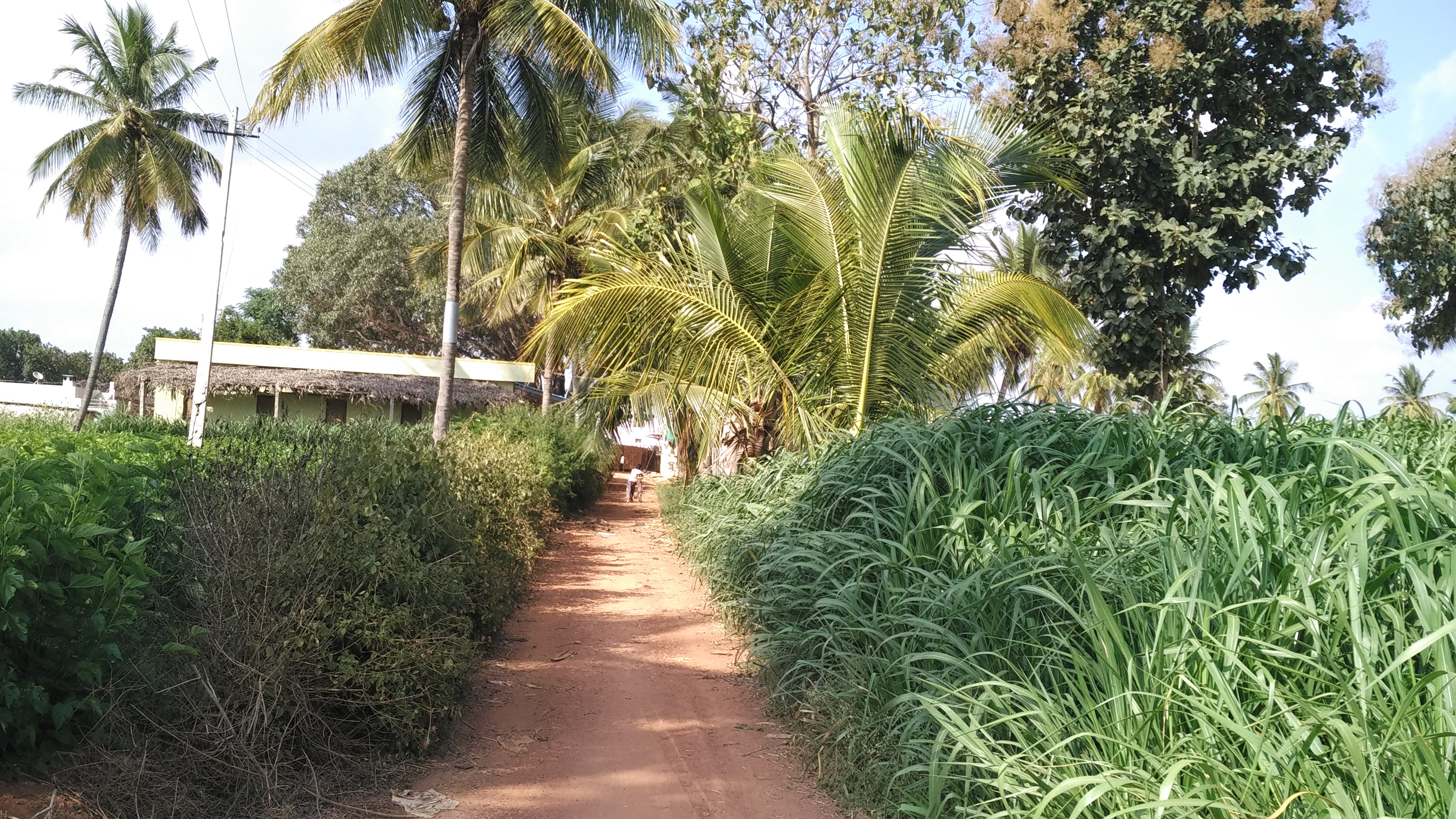
Sub way Road to Yennanguru village

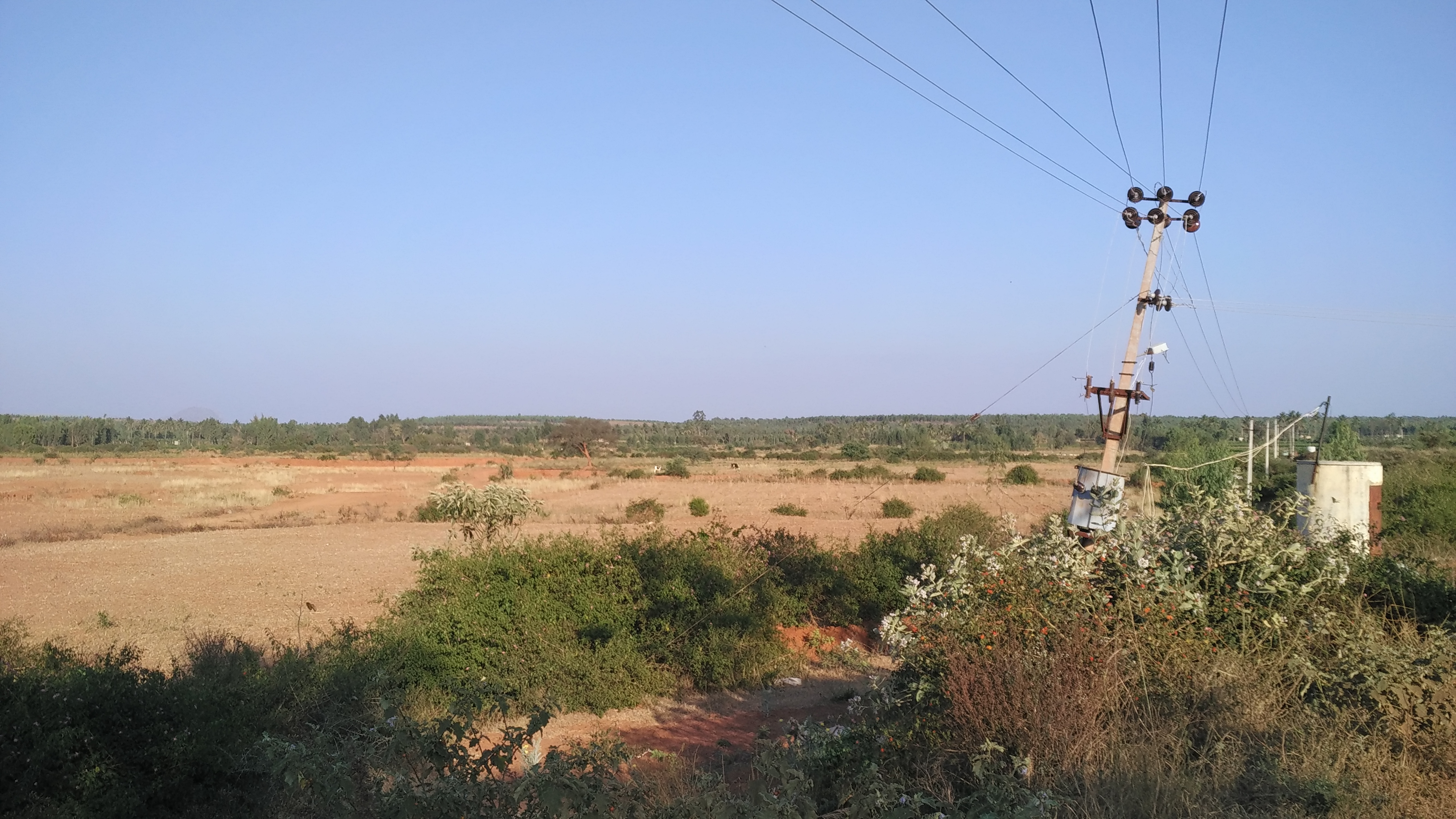
Lake view from bridge

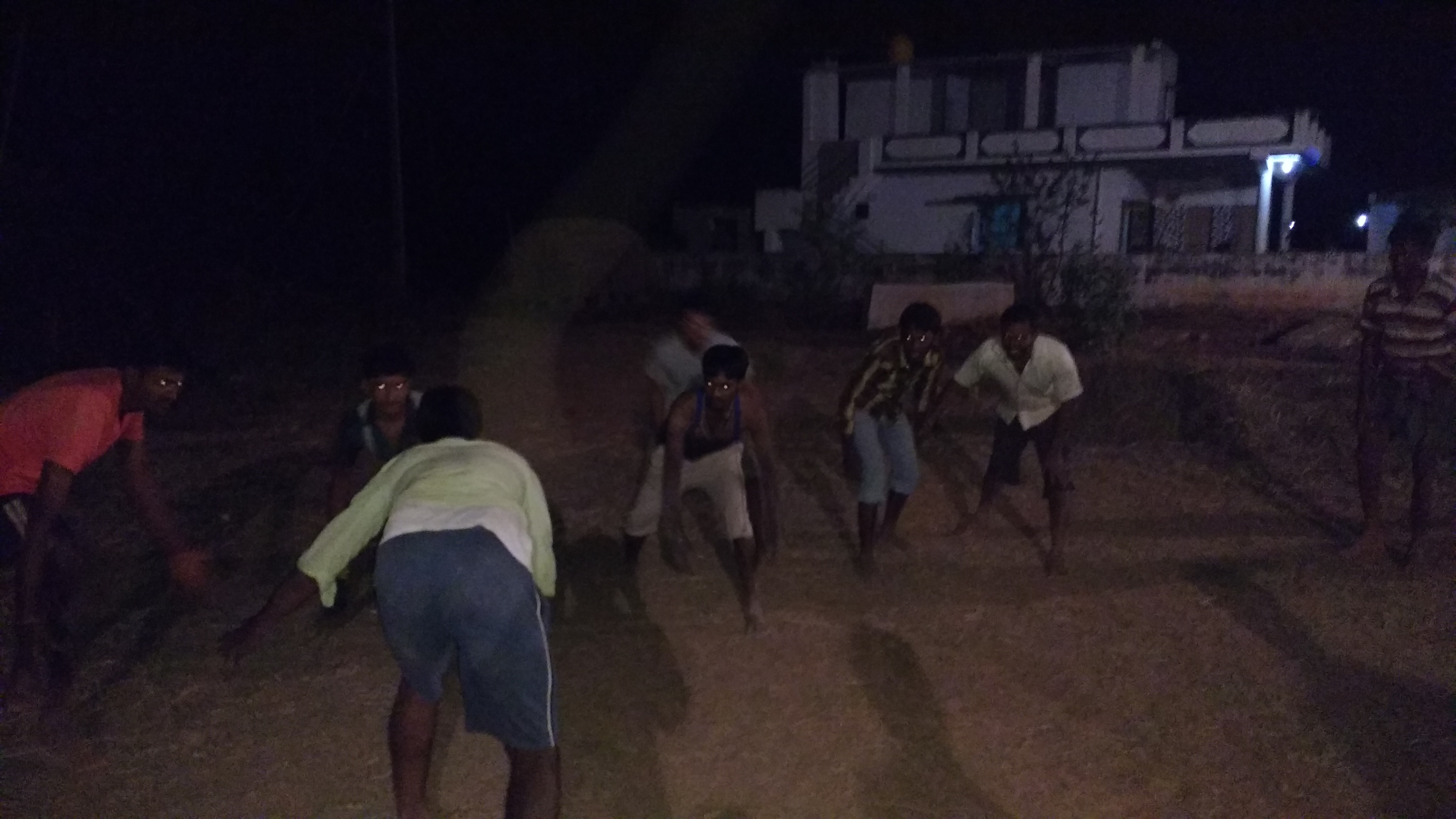
ಶಿವರಾತ್ರಿ ಹಬ್ಬದ ಸಮಯದಲ್ಲಿ ಕಬಡ್ಡಿ ಆಡುವ ಹಳ್ಳಿಗರು

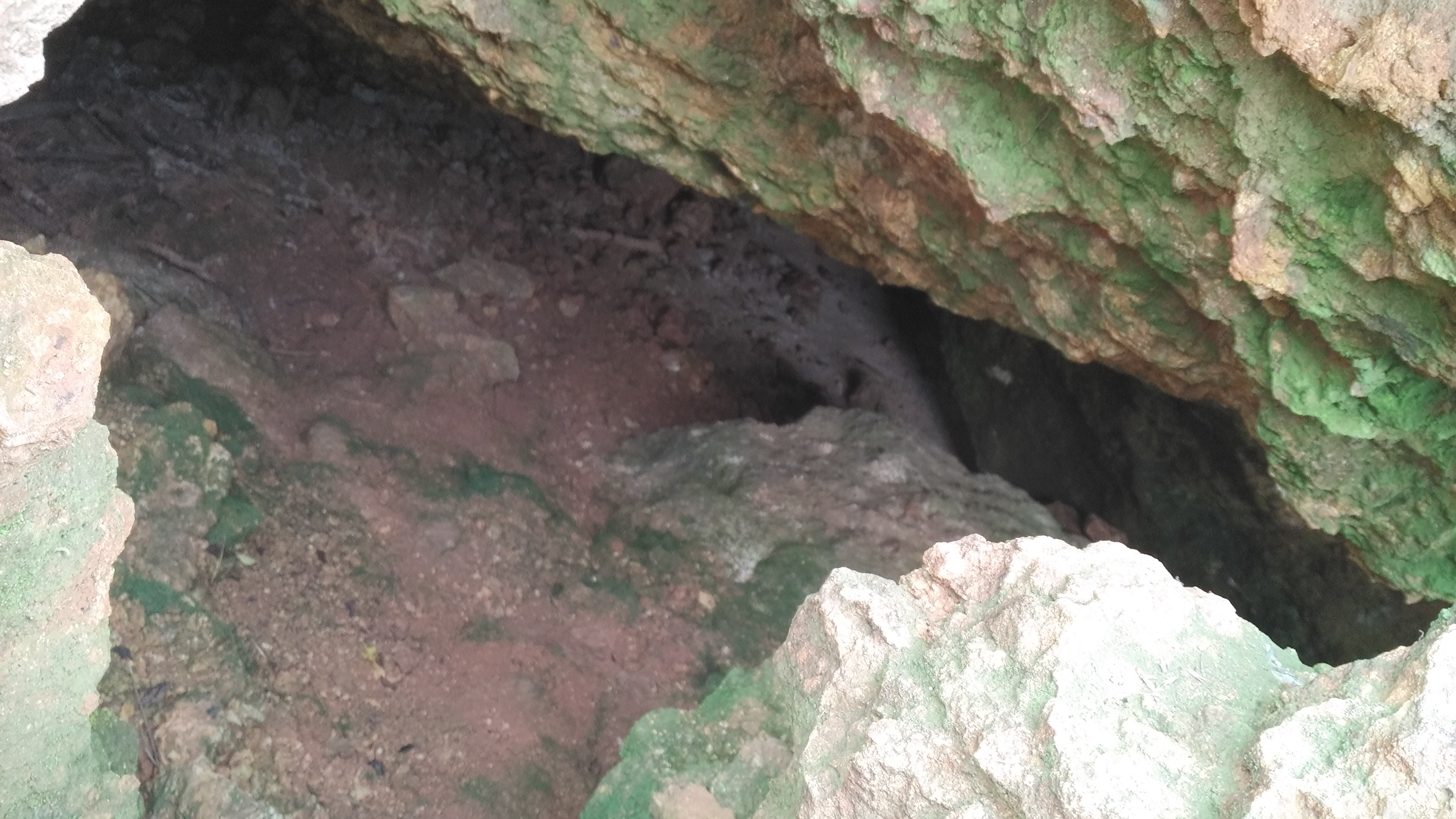
ಗುಹೆಯ ತೆರೆದ ನೋಟ

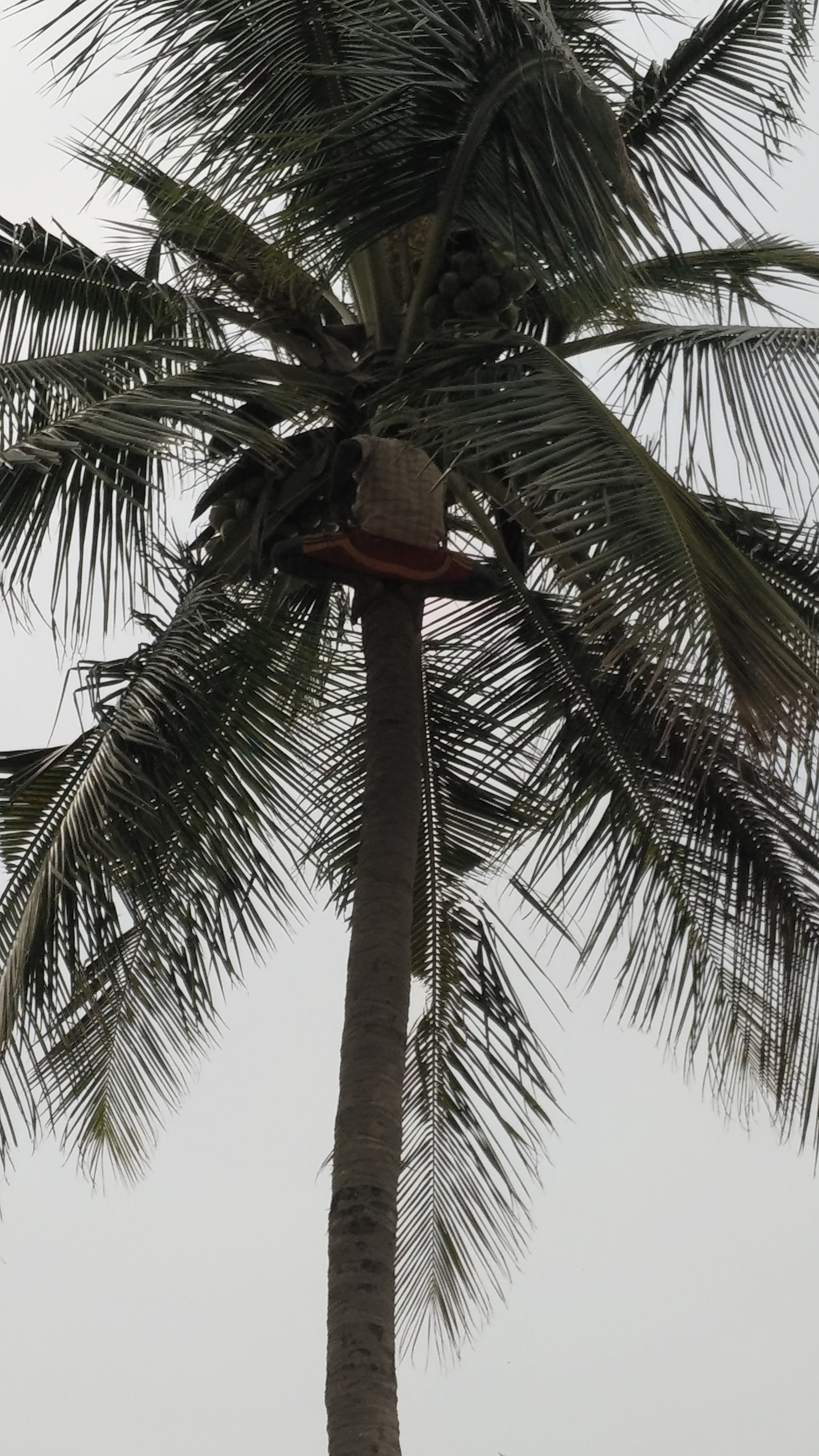
ತೆಂಗಿನ ಮರ ಏರುತ್ತಿರುವ ಯುವಕ

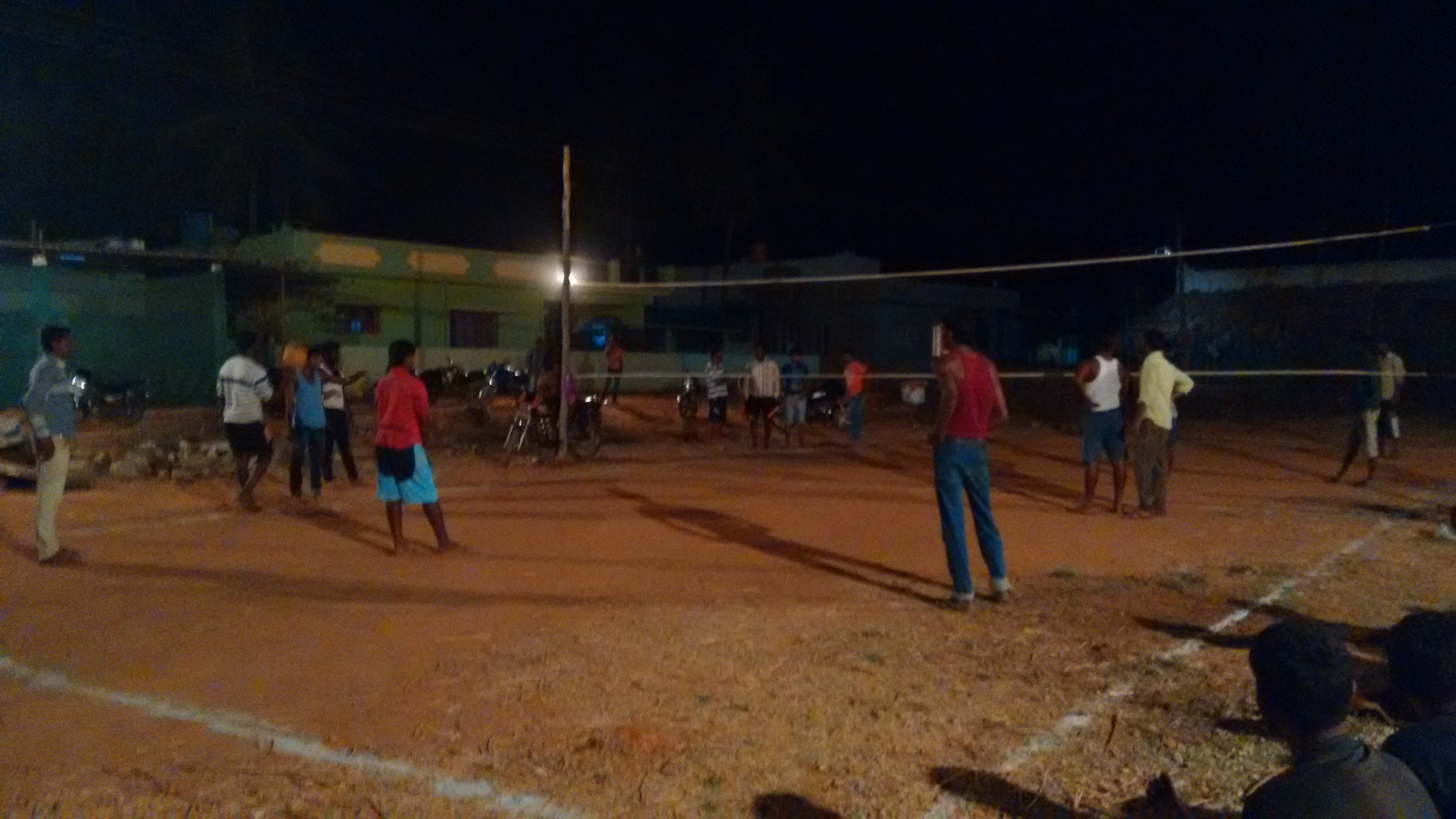
ವಾಲಿಬಾಲ್ ಆಡುತ್ತಿರುವ ಯುವಕರು

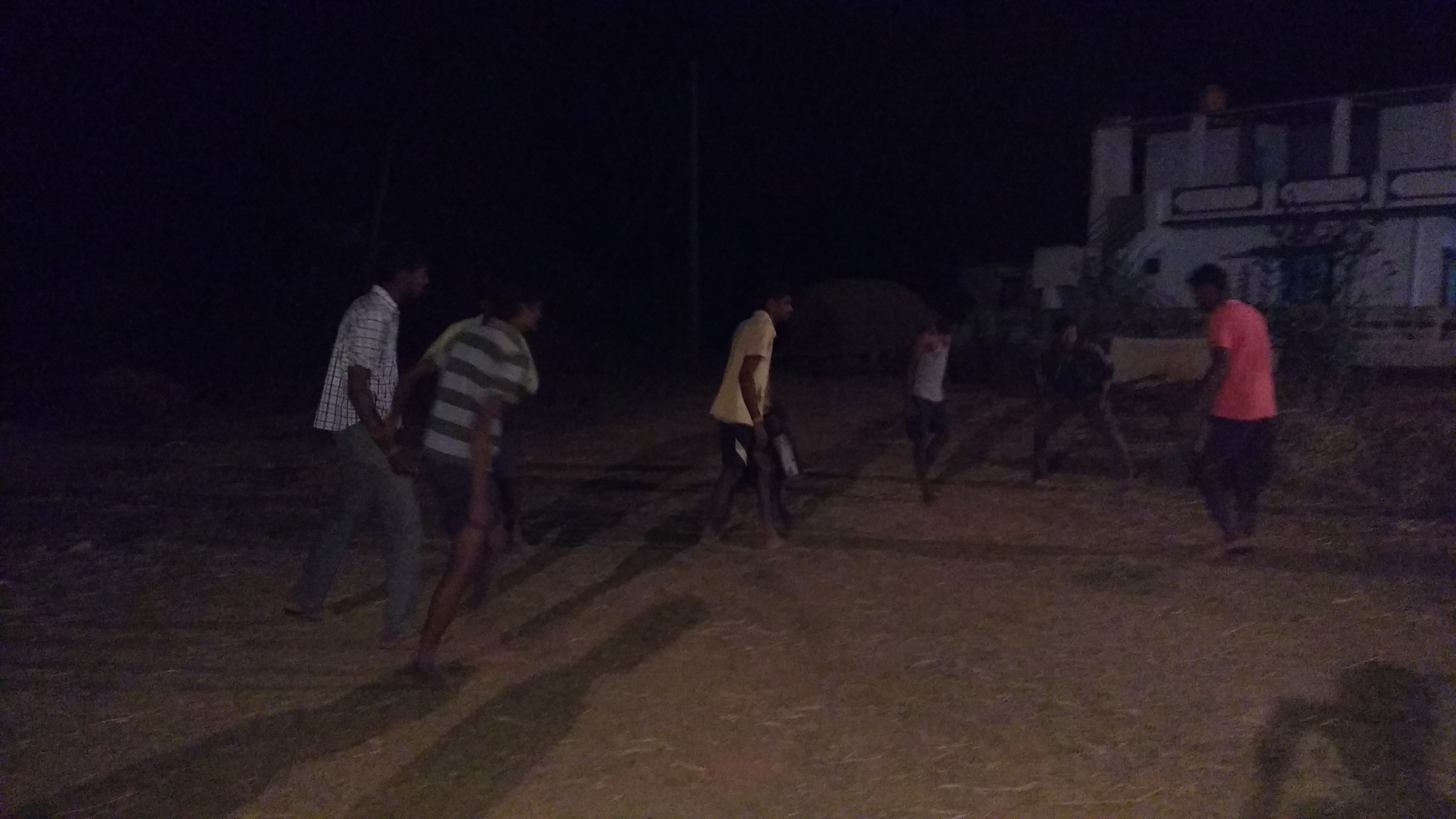
ಕಬಡ್ಡಿ ಆಟದಲ್ಲಿ ರೋಚಕ ಕ್ಷಣ

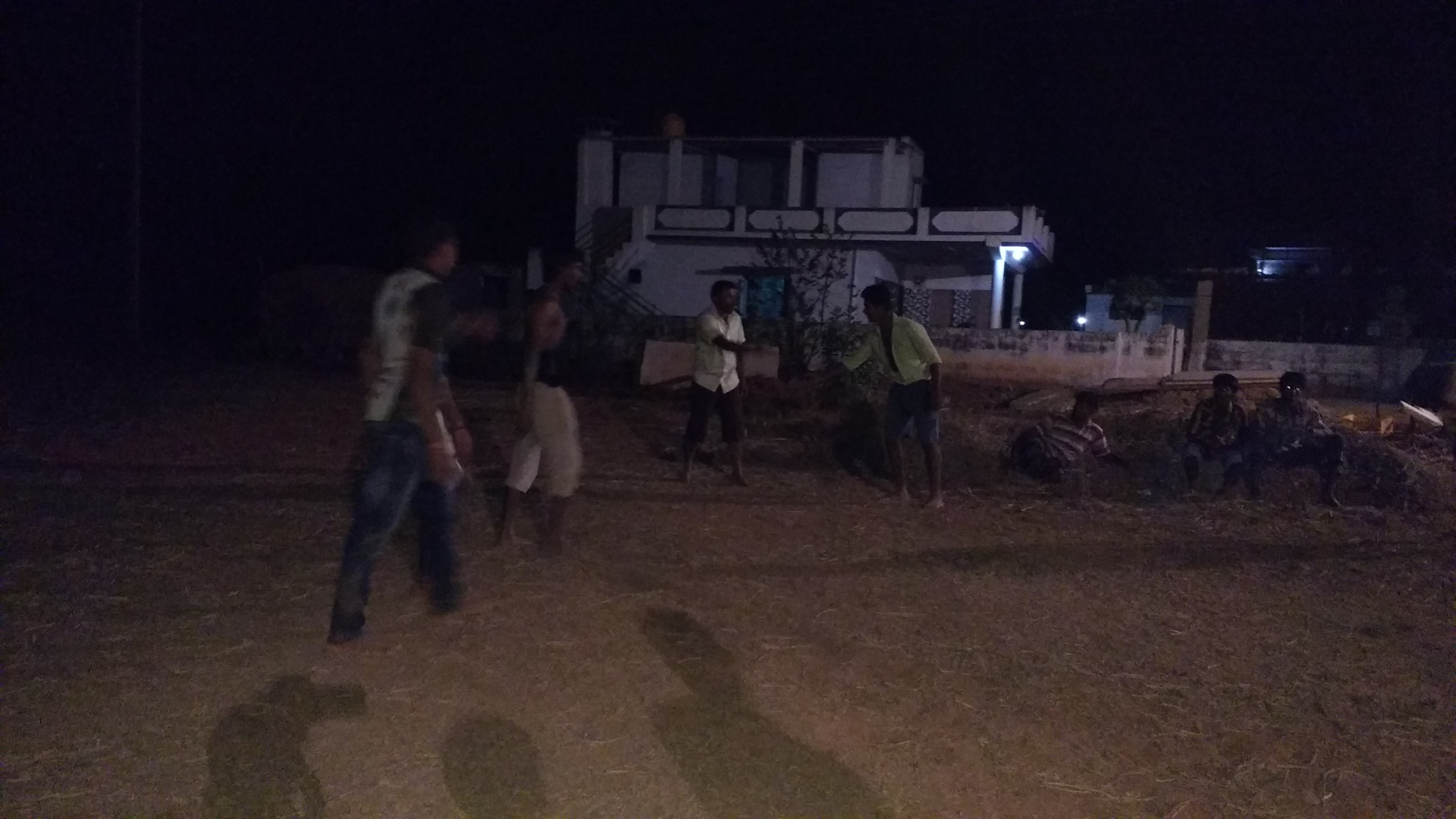
ಕಬಡ್ಡಿ ಆಡುತ್ತಿರುವ ಯುವಕರು

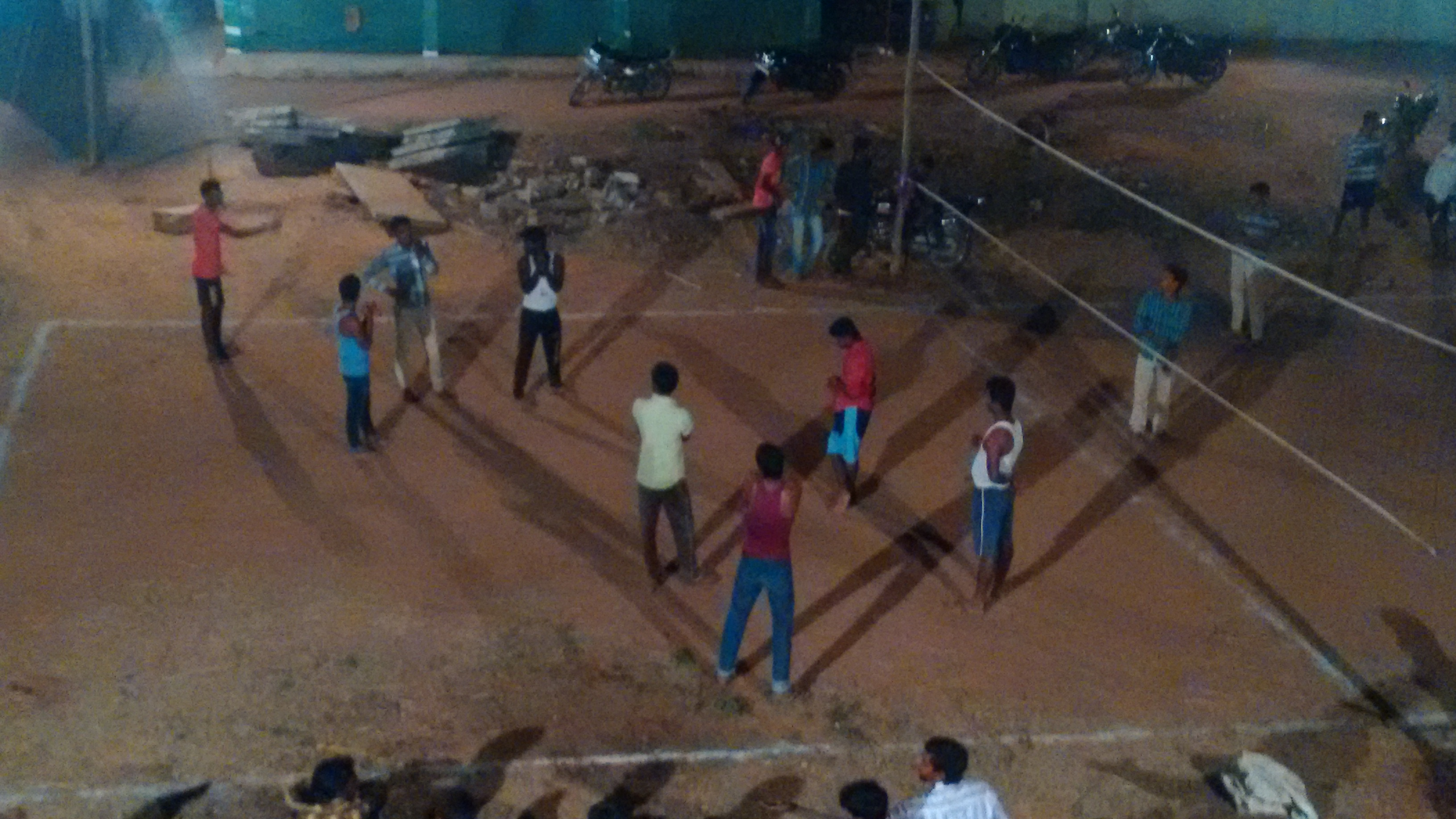
ವಾಲಿಬಾಲ್ ಆಟದ ಮೇಲಿನ ನೋಟ

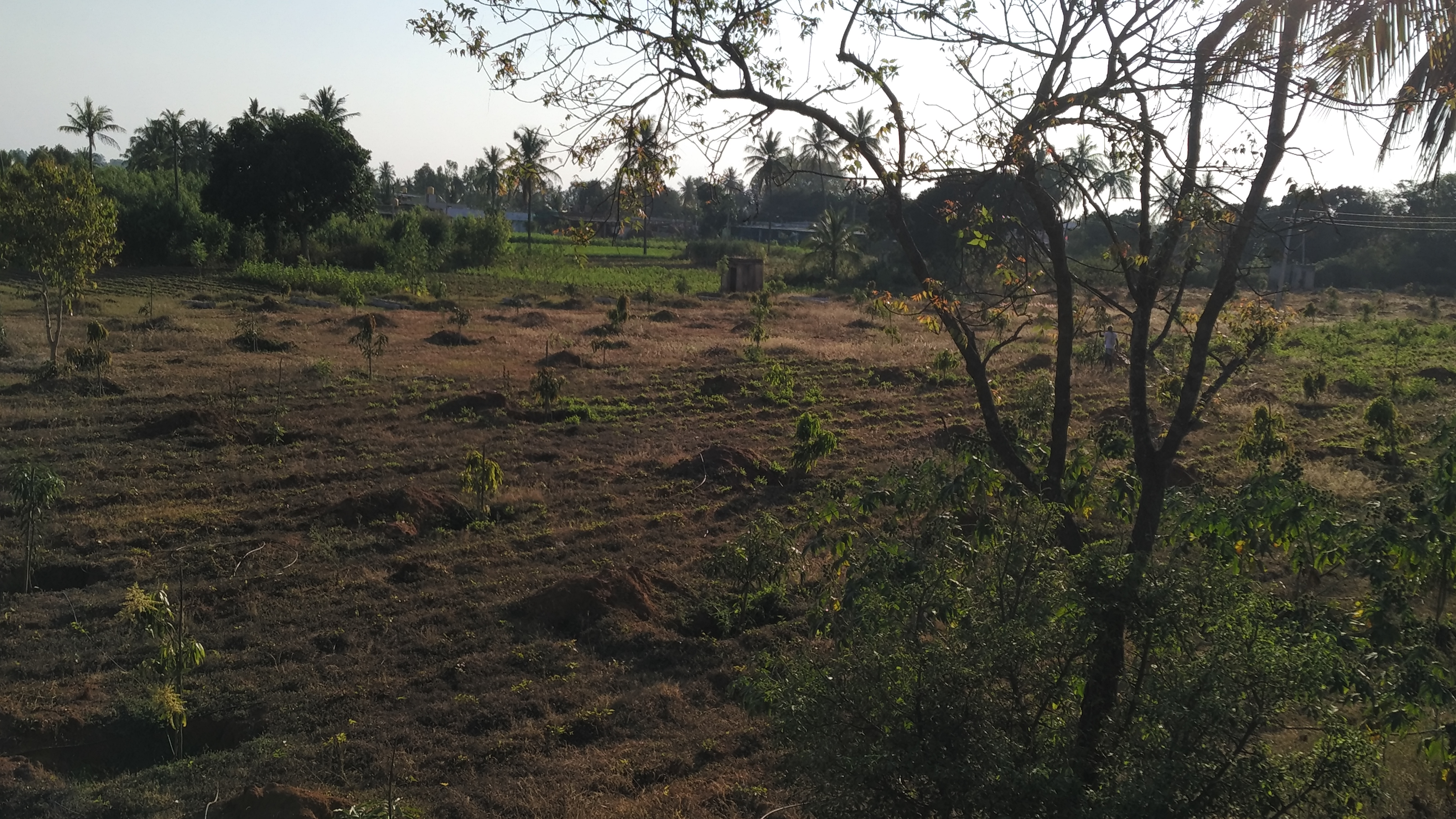
Mango plantation

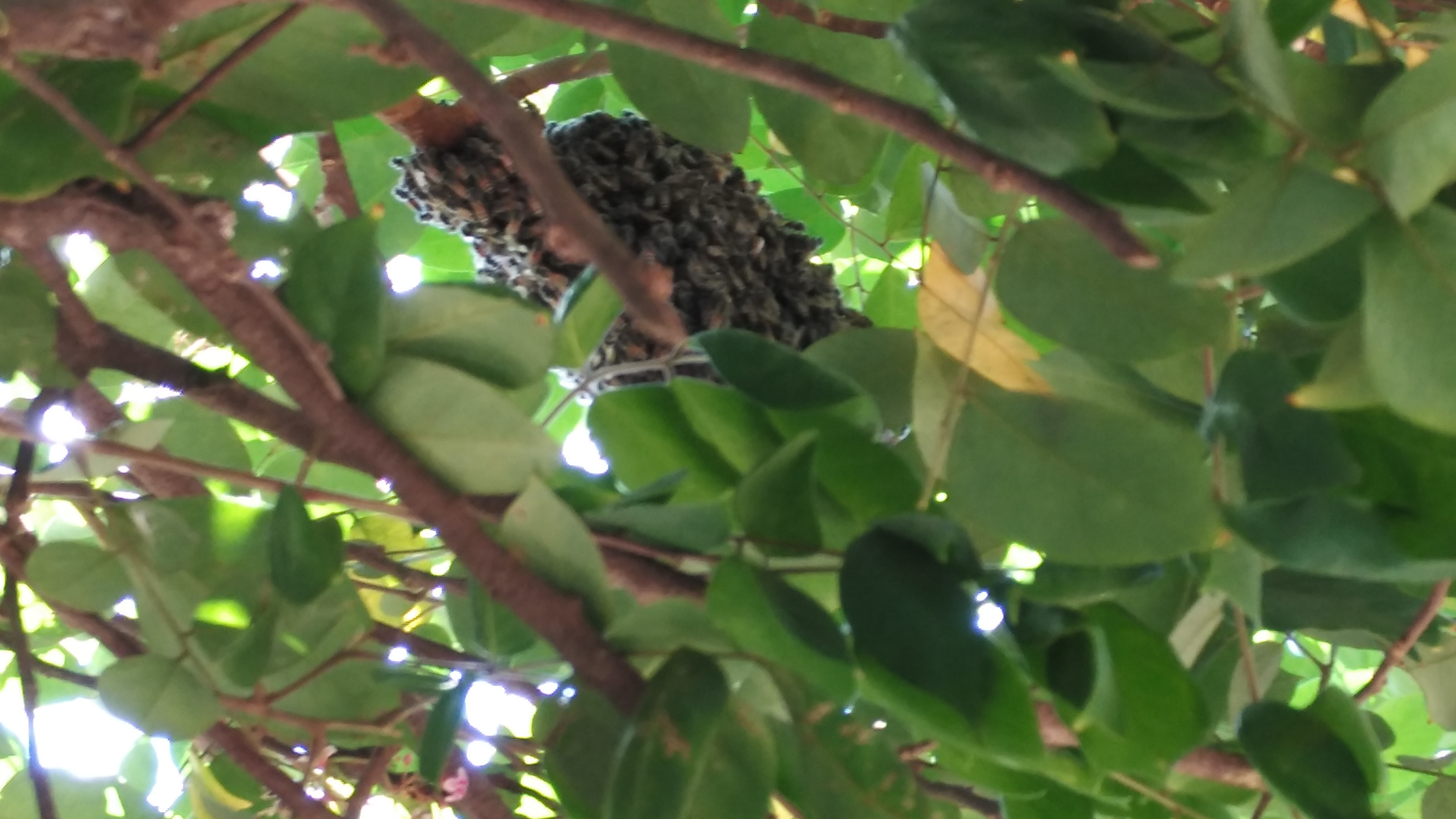
ಜೇನು ಗೂಡು
