= Mesha Sankranti =

Solar New Year in the Hindu calendar

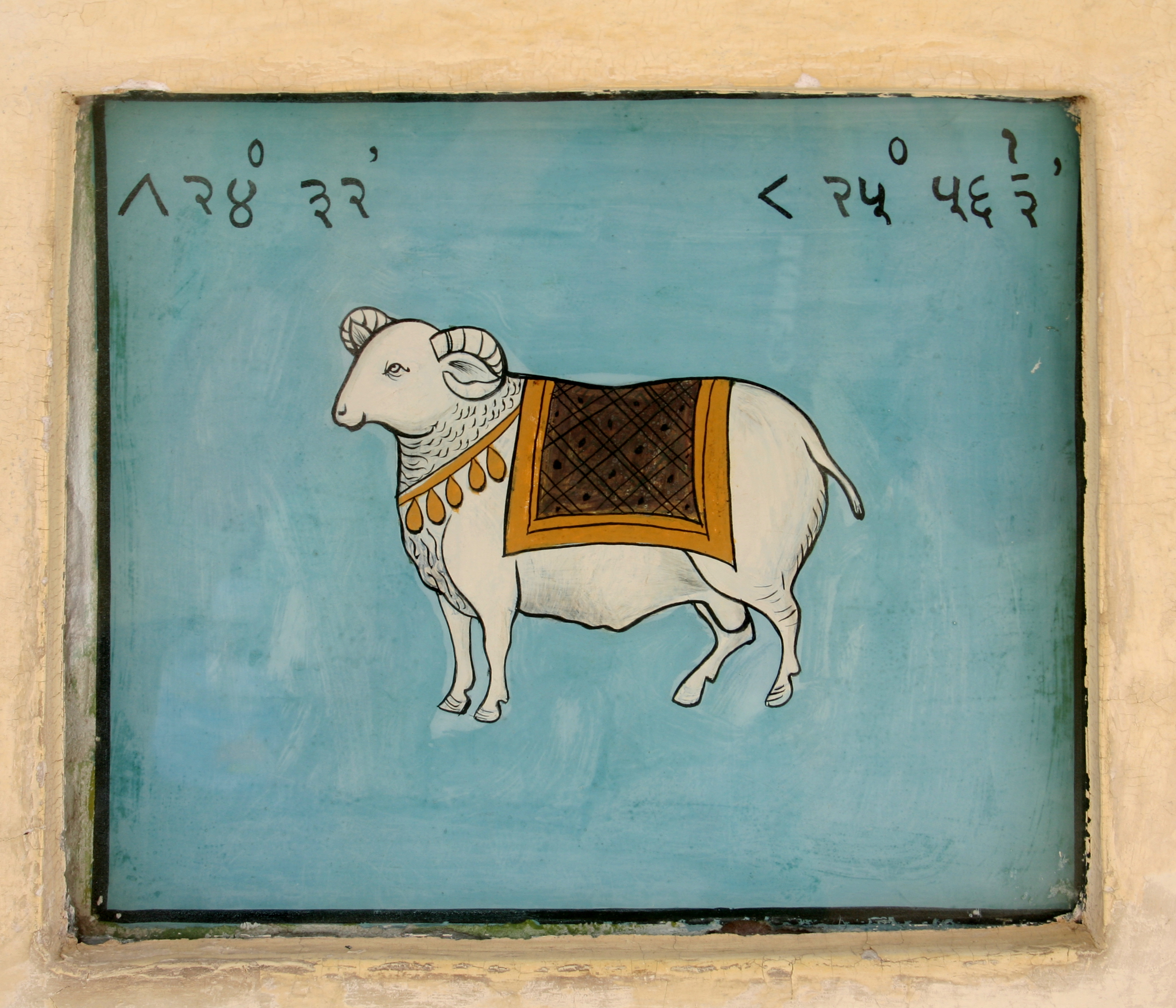
- Mesha zodiac sign in Jaipur, India
- Also called: Mesha Sankranti
- Date: First day of meṣa masa (13 Apr on leap years; 14th Apr on all other years)
- Frequency: Annual

Mesha Sankranti (also called Meta Sankramana or Mesha Sankramana or Hindu Solar New Year) refers to the first day of the solar cycle year, that is the solar New Year in the Hindu luni-solar calendar. The Hindu calendar also has a lunar new year, which is religiously more significant. The solar cycle year is significant in Malayalam, Assamese, Odia, Punjabi, Tamil, and Bengali calendars.

The day represents specific solar movement according to ancient Sanskrit texts. Mesha Sankranti is one of the twelve Sankranti in the Indian calendar. The concept is also found in Indian astronomy texts wherein it refers to the day of transition of the Sun into the Aries zodiac sign.

The day is important in solar and lunisolar calendars followed on the subcontinent. Mesha Sankranti falls on 13 April usually, sometimes 14 April. This day is the basis for Vishu and other similar major Hindu, Sikh and Buddhist festivals, of which Pohela Boishakh, Vaisakhi, and Vesak are also best known.

== Etymology ==
The phrase Mesha Sankranti consists of two Sanskrit words. Sankranti literally means "going from one place to another, transference, course change, entry into" particularly in the context of sun or planets, while Mesha means sheep or Aries constellation. The term Mesha Sankranti connotes a specific day based on time keeping practices developed in the ancient Sanskrit texts of the Vedanga field of study called Jyotisha and later texts such as the Surya Siddhanta.

== Observance ==
Many regional calendars have two elements: lunar and solar. The lunar element is based on the movement of the moon and counts each month from either new moon to new moon, full moon to full moon, or the day after the full moon to the next full moon. The lunar element forms the basis of religious calendars and begin the year in Chaitra. Many regions begin the local new year with the commencement of the lunar calendar: Gudi Padwa in Maharashtra and Goa; Cheti Chand for the Sindhi Hindus; and Navreh for the Kashmiri Hindus. In Gujarat, the regional year commences with the lunar month of Kartika after Diwali.

The solar element of lunisolar calendars begin the year on Mesha Sankranti. This day is observed by people across India, even in regions which begin the new year using the lunar calendar. However, some regions also begin the regional new year on Mesha Sankranti.

== See also ==
- Songkran, the term used to refer to the Buddhist calendar-based New Year festivals of April
- South and Southeast Asian New Year, observations based on mesha sankranti
- Zodiac
