= Sankranti =

Transmigration of the sun in Hindu astronomy

Sankranti (Sanskrit: संक्रान्ति, romanized: Saṁkrānti) refers to the transmigration of the sun from one zodiac to another in Indian astronomy. In Saurmana varsha (Hindu Solar year), there are twelve Sankrantis corresponding with twelve months of a year. The Sankrantis can be broadly classified into four main categories: Ayan (Solstice), Vishuva (Equinox), Vishupadi and Shadshitimukhi sankrantis. Each Sankranti is marked as the beginning of a month in the sidereal solar calendars followed in South Indian states: Andhra Pradesh, Telangana, Tamil Nadu, Kerala, Karnataka; Himalayan states: Jammu region, Himachal Pradesh, Uttarakhand, North Punjab and states of Eastern India: Odisha, Mithila region of Bihar and Nepal. On the other hand, in the sidereal solar Bengali calendar and Assamese calendar, a Sankranti is marked as the end of each month and the day following as the beginning of a new month.

== Important Sankrantis ==
- Makar Sankranti: Marks the transition of the Sun into Makara Râshi (Capricorn) on its celestial path, and the six-month Uttarayana period. Makar Sankranti is also called Uttarayana - the day on which the sun begins his northward journey. The traditional Indian calendar is based on lunar positions, Sankranti is a solar event. The date of Makar Sankranti remains constant over a long term, 14 January or occasionally, 15 January as the Sun begins to rise in Makara Râshi.
- Mesha Sankranti: Marks the beginning of the New Year in the traditional Hindu Solar Calendar. On this day, the sun enters the sidereal Aries, or Mesha Râshi. It generally falls on 14/15 April. Regional New Year festivals also take place on this day: Vishu in Kerala, Puthandu in Tamil Nadu, Bisu Parba in Tulu Nadu region, Vaisakhi in the Punjab region, Pana Sankranti in Odisha, Jude Sheetal in Mithila region of Bihar and Satuaan in Bhojpuri region and on the day after Mesha Sankranti, is Pohela Boishakh in Bengal and Bohag Bihu in Assam and Avuruddu in Sri Lanka, and Songkran in Southeast Asia.
- Mithuna Sankranti: celebrated as annual menstruating phase of Mother Earth as Raja Parba or Ambubachi Mela in Eastern and North Eastern provinces of India.
- Dhanu Sankranti: celebrated on the first day of the solar month. In Southern Bhutan and Nepal it is celebrated by eating wild potatoes (Darul). The 2017 date is December 17.
- Karka Sankranti: July 16, marks the transition of the Sun into Karka Râshi (Cancer). This also marks the end of the six-month Uttarayana period on the Hindu calendar, and the beginning of Dakshinayana, which itself end at Makar Sankranti.
- Simha Sankranti: It is celebrated on the first day of the solar month on the Hindu calendar i.e. Bhadrapada. The festival holds special significance in Ramban district of Jammu division. People visit Chandrabhaga river and offer floral offerings. It is popularly known by the name Singh Sankrant. Local tradition traces the origin of the festival to Pandavas.
- Nol Sankranti: It is celebrated on the first day of the solar month on the Hindu calendar i.e. Kartik (month). It is also called Dak Sankranti. Sadh Bhokhon or Godbharai is a special tradition for pregnant Hindu women. Hindu people believe that rice plants are too pregnant from the middle of September to the middle of October, so the farmers arrange a ritual for good production of paddy like the production of the Nol plant. Borassus flabellifer seeds are used as prasad. The festival holds special significance in West Bengal and Assam state.

== See also ==
- Astronomical basis of the Hindu calendar
- Sankashti Chaturthi
