= Satuaan =

Festival of Bhojpuri region

Satuaan or Satuaani (Bhojpuri: 𑂮𑂞𑂳𑂄𑂢) is an annual harvest festival of Bhojpuri people celebrated in the month of Chaita of the Hindu calendar. It usually comes on 14 April of the Gregorian calendar. People eat Satua, a whole grain flour of several cereals, with pickles and salad to celebrate the festival. People eat this after taking baths in nearby ponds and rivers, and say thanks to mother nature for providing life.
