= Impact of the COVID-19 pandemic on religion =

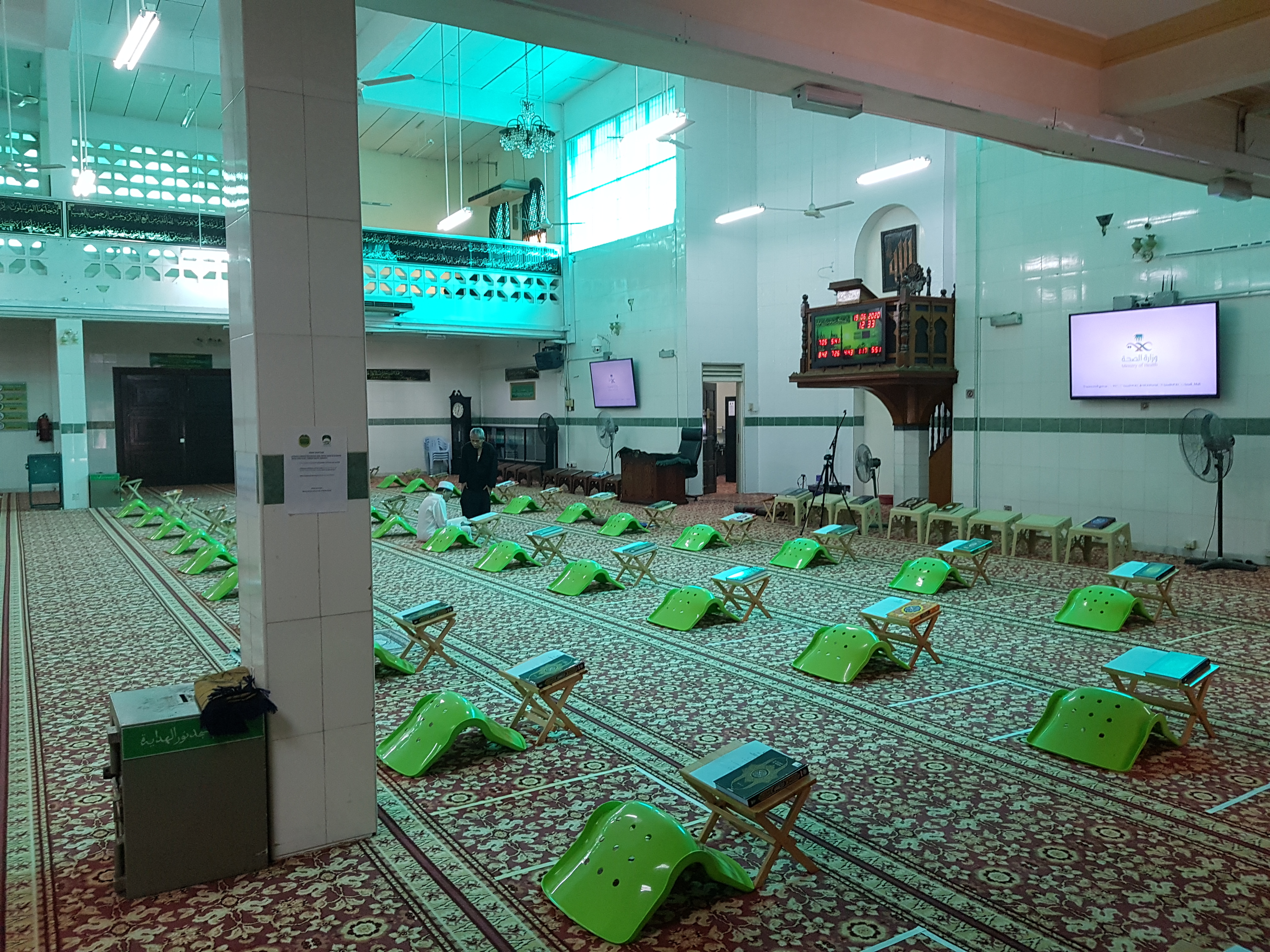
Social distancing measures implemented at a mosque in Malaysia during the movement control order

The COVID-19 pandemic has impacted religion in various ways, including the cancellation of the worship services of various faiths and the closure of Sunday schools, as well as the cancellation of pilgrimages, ceremonies and festivals. Many churches, synagogues, mosques, and temples have offered worship through livestream amidst the pandemic, or held interactive sessions on Zoom.

Relief wings of religious organisations have dispatched disinfection supplies, powered air-purifying respirators, face shields, gloves, coronavirus nucleic acid detection reagents, ventilators, patient monitors, syringe pumps, infusion pumps, and food to affected areas. Other churches have offered free COVID-19 testing to the public. Adherents of many religions have gathered together to pray for an end to the COVID-19 pandemic, for those affected by it, as well as for wisdom for physicians and scientists to combat the disease.

== Religions ==
=== Christianity ===
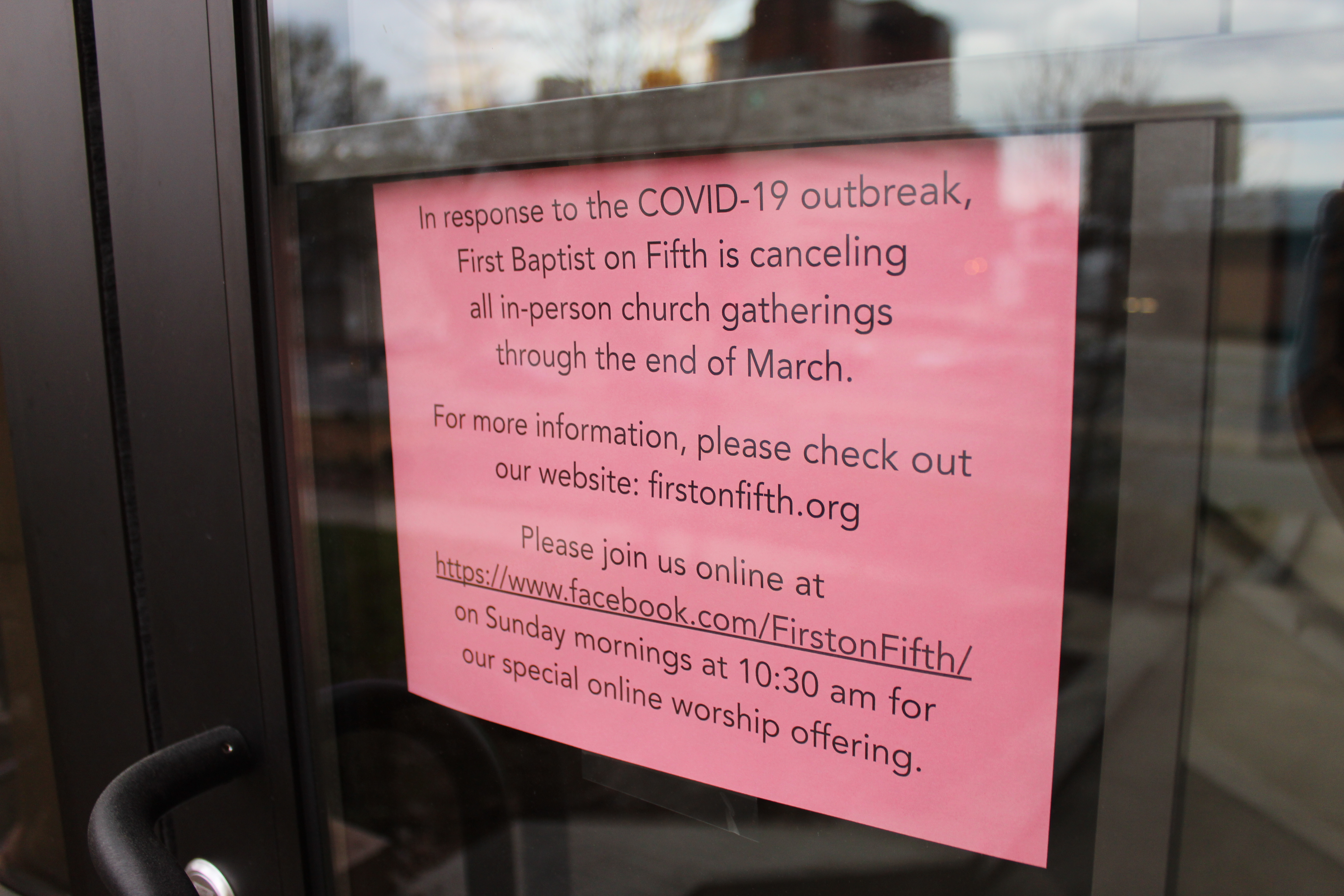
A sign on a Baptist Christian church that has been temporarily closed due to the pandemic

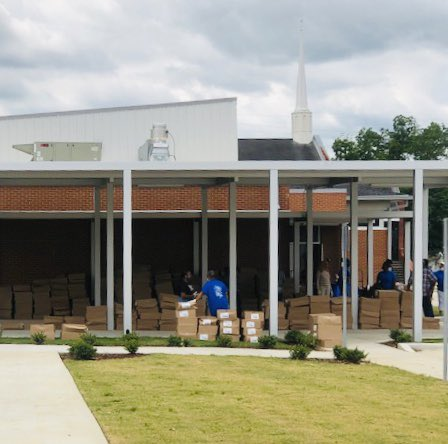
Food relief at a Baptist Christian church in Tuscaloosa, Alabama, United States, during the pandemic

==== Response and impact ====
According to a Gallup report by Frank Newport "the most dramatic result (in religion) has been the exceedingly quick shift of religious services from in-person to online worship." While for almost a hundred years, churches have used various communication methods to reach their audiences, such as radio, television and online media, Gallup says that the halting of in-person worship "is one of the most significant sudden disruptions in the practice of religion in U.S. history." A Pew Research report from March 2020 reported a change in respondents' religious habits due to the pandemic. More than half of respondents said that they have "prayed for an end to the spread of coronavirus," "attended services in person less often," and "watched religious services online or on TV instead of in person." Time magazine reported that drive-in church services have achieved a great level of attendance in the COVID-19 outbreak. As to whether the crisis had an effect on long-term personal religious life, 19% of Americans said that their faith has strengthened and only 3% said that it got worse.

In a survey conducted in late May–early June 2020 by the American Enterprise Institute, 60% of Americans said they feared that they or someone in their household might get COVID-19. Responses differed demographically, however; 69% of Black Protestants and 42% of White Evangelicals worried about infection. When it came to weighing the public health risks of returning to normal economic activity, a majority of Black Protestants (84%) and Hispanic Catholics (70%) said they would prioritize public health, while a majority of White Evangelicals (65%) and White Mainline Protestants and White Catholics (52%) prioritized the economy.

In the United Kingdom, Christian denominations including the Anglican, Catholic, Methodist, Baptist, Reformed, and Presbyterian Churches, published guidelines on adapting worship in light of the pandemic.

In July 2020, North Point Ministries—which, before the pandemic, typically hosted 30,000 churchgoers every Sunday across its seven locations in the Atlanta, Georgia area—said it would only offer services digitally through the rest of the year. The church's founder said that contact tracing for coronavirus exposure would be impossible given the church's size.

On 30 November 2020, one of the pastors at the California megachurch Water of Life died of COVID-19. He had recently been leading outdoor services.

==== Food and medical assistance and social justice work ====
World Council of Churches General Secretary Olav Fykse Tveit announced that, "This situation calls on our solidarity and accountability, mindfulness, care and wisdom... [as well as] for our signs of faith, hope and love". Amidst the COVID-19 pandemic, some churches continue to operate their food pantries that are offering bags filled with meat and toilet paper rolls for families in need. The National Cathedral of the United States, which belongs to the Episcopal Church, donated over five-thousand N95 surgical masks to hospitals of Washington, D.C., which were in shortage during the COVID-19 pandemic. Other churches, such as the Church of the Highlands, an evangelical Christian megachurch, have offered free COVID-19 tests in their parking lots. Some chaplains, such as Father Benito Rodríguez Regueiro, have chosen to remain on call 24/7 for COVID-19 patients.

In April 2020 over 200 church and civil society organisations, including Caritas and the Jesuit Refugee Service, called on the government of Greece to restore access to asylum for refugees, especially the 42,000 stated to be "trapped" and living "in horrific conditions" in the Greek islands.

==== Social distancing ====
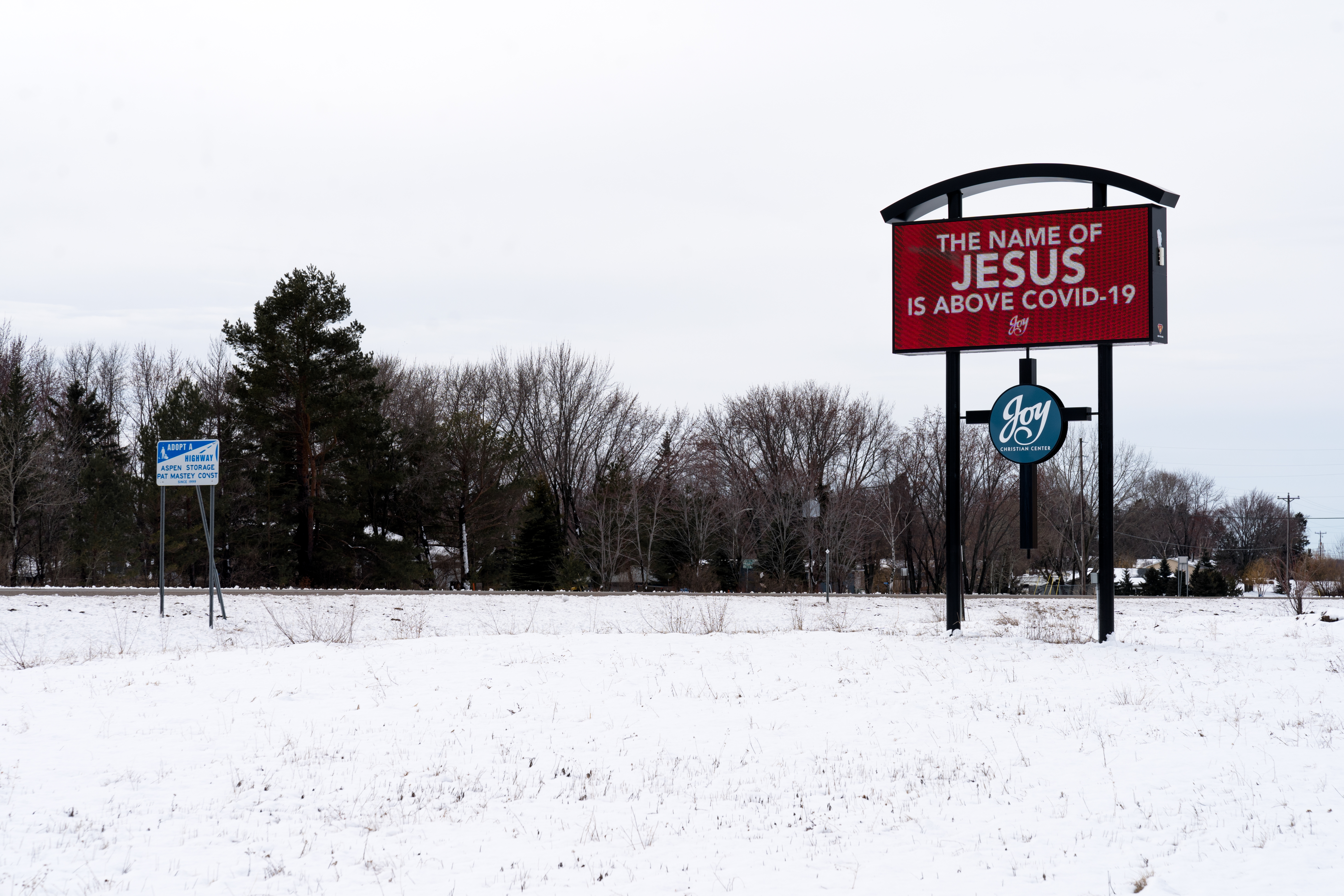
"The name of Jesus is above COVID-19": a message on a sign at Joy Christian Center in St. Cloud, Minnesota

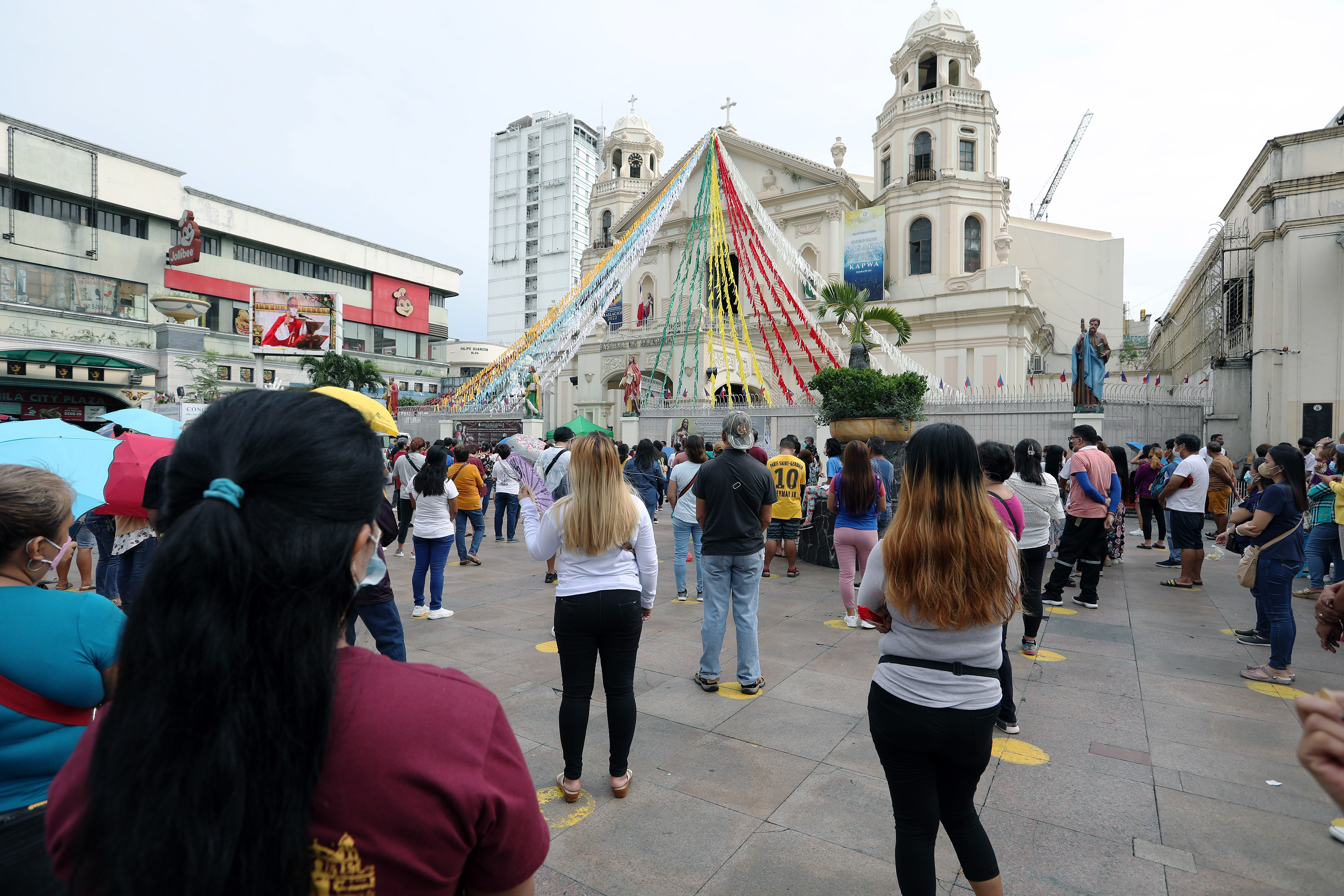
Devotees of the Black Nazarene observe social distancing as they attend Mass in front of Quiapo Church in Manila, Philippines on July 1, 2022.

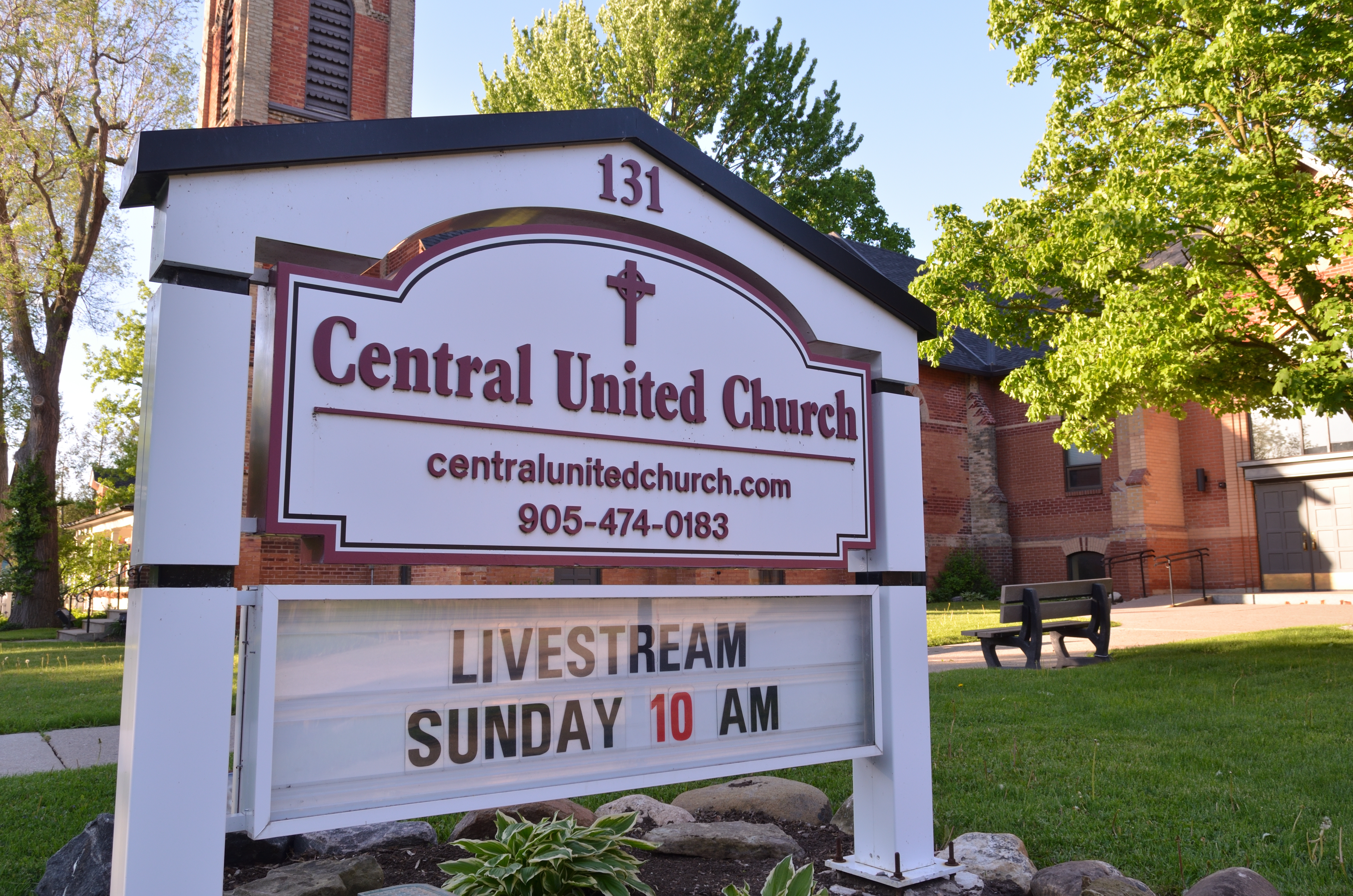
Sunday worship is livestreamed online due to social distancing.

Many Episcopal and Catholic dioceses have recommended older Christians to stay at home rather than attending Mass on Sundays, which is usually required; many churches of all Christian denominations have made church services available via radio, online livestreaming or television while others have offered drive-in services in their church parking lots, some with guidelines on how to use car functions to respond to the service. Some Christians are using online apps, which contain prayers and daily devotionals, to remain engaged with their faith.

Many Christians traditionally observe the Christian penitential season of Lent through the abstinence from meat on Fridays, especially Roman Catholics, Methodists and Anglicans; the requirement to observe this custom was lifted by some Roman Catholic bishops amidst the COVID-19 pandemic, which partially coincided with Lent in 2020. The liturgies normally held during Holy Week (especially those on Palm Sunday, Spy Wednesday, Maundy Thursday, Good Friday and Holy Saturday), the last week of Lent, were canceled by many churches belonging to mainstream Christian denominations, including the Anglican, Catholic, Lutheran, Methodist, Moravian, and Reformed Churches. These included the Royal Maundy charity service done by the monarch of the United Kingdom on Maundy Thursday.

Referencing the Christian doctrine of the Body of Christ, Anglican priest Jonathan Warren Pagán wrote that "Gathered worship in word and sacrament is therefore not an optional add-on for Christians" though the COVID-19 pandemic rendered it necessary to move to online formats for the common good. He encouraged the practice of Spiritual Communion amidst the pandemic (especially during the Anglican service of Morning Prayer), which has been used by Christians during times of plagues, as well as during times of persecution, both of which have prevented Christians from gathering on the Lord's Day to celebrate the Eucharist. Methodist clergy, as well as Pope Francis, also suggested that the faithful practice Spiritual Communion during the COVID-19 pandemic.

The celebration of Saint Patrick's Day, a feast day celebrating the arrival of Christianity in Ireland, on 17 March 2020 was affected by the COVID-19 pandemic, though services were still held in some churches and some parades still commenced.

While many churches canceled Easter services to comply with social-distancing guidelines, others planned to continue normally. On 11 April 2020, the day before Easter Sunday, the president of the American conservative think tank the Claremont Institute, tweeted for "resistance and civil disobedience to an unconstitutional lockdown" so people could enjoy "free exercise of religion."

==== Digital church services ====
Due to social-distancing guidelines, many churches needed to find alternatives to normal face-to-face church services and have turned to digital church. On Easter Sunday, Pope Francis livestreamed mass from an empty St. Peter's Basilica in Rome while the Archbishop of Canterbury, Justin Welby broadcast his sermon from the kitchen of his flat in London. Many local churches throughout the world would look into ways of digitizing church practices, though some debated how certain liturgical practices such as communion could or could not be performed online. In rural churches where access to technology was more limited, some local churches needed to be more creative, including practices such as drive-by processions of the Blessed Sacrament. Some studies in digital theology have highlighted an increased interest in watching and participating in online church services under lockdown. The interconnectivity promoted by digital technologies has helped promote the ability for individuals to participate in religious activities despite physical distance, including those who previously may have never set foot in a church. However, other studies have highlighted that Christians who regularly attended physical church services have been less keen to participate online, especially among millennials. By the fourth Easter of the pandemic, numerous churches had long since incorporated on-line services into their regular schedule. Although Zoom meetings and the like well-suited for meetings such as Bible study, and Millennials and younger demographic cohorts are accustomed to on-line forms of the fellowship, the number of Catholics attending (required) weekly Mass has been estimated to have declined from 22% in 2019 to 17% by 2023.

==== By denomination ====
===== Lutheranism =====
Lutheran Disaster Response, the relief wing of the Evangelical Lutheran Church in America (ELCA) has provided supplies to China, whence the disease originated; these include disinfection supplies, powered air-purifying respirators, face shields, gloves, coronavirus nucleic acid detection reagents, ventilators, patient monitors, syringe pumps, infusion pumps, and food to affected areas.

As most supplies are being sent to developed countries, Lutheran World Relief is working to send resources to Africa, where Allyson Bear says "widespread poverty and crowded urban slums put Africans at extreme risk." At Lutheran World Relief clinics in Nairobi, where multiple months of HIV medication are provided to patients, people were educated on the importance of handwashing and protective equipment has been repurposed to address the COVID-19 pandemic.

Lutheran Disaster Response is supporting congregational feeding ministries to "do the critical work of providing those who are in need in their communities with food." ELCA is also sending food, medical and essential supply deliveries to New Orleans, Southern California, Italy, Palestine and Sierra Leone and working with the Lutheran World Foundation and the ACT Alliance.

===== Anglicanism =====
The Church of England, the state church, as well as other ecclesiastical provinces of the Anglican Communion in the world such as the Church in Wales, and the Scottish Episcopal Church, suspended in-person worship amidst the pandemic.

The General Synod (Remote Meetings) Measure 2020 (No. 3) (originally the General Synod (Remote Meetings) (Temporary Standings Orders) Measure 2020) is a measure passed by the General Synod of the Church of England enabling remote meetings. It was passed in a special one-day sitting of the General Synod in September 2020. The measure was amended by the Church of England (Miscellaneous Provisions) Measure 2024 so that the hybrid meeting arrangements became permanent.

The Archbishop of Canterbury led a virtual Eucharist that was broadcast on thirty-nine BBC stations. The Church of Ireland Archbishop of Dublin and Bishop of Glendalough of the United Diocese of Dublin and Glendalough Most Reverend Michael Jackson has: A Prayer in the Time of the Coronavirus. In Time magazine, Anglican theologian and University of Oxford professor N. T. Wright characterised the COVID-19 pandemic as one that focuses on the Christian theme of lamentation, in which both God and humanity mourn together:

A priest wearing a mask matching her vestments preparing for Eucharist outdoors at an Episcopal Church in Minnesota

The point of lament, woven thus into the fabric of the biblical tradition, is not just that it's an outlet for our frustration, sorrow, loneliness and sheer inability to understand what is happening or why. The mystery of the biblical story is that God also laments. Some Christians like to think of God as above all that, knowing everything, in charge of everything, calm and unaffected by the troubles in his world. That's not the picture we get in the Bible. God was grieved to his heart, Genesis declares, over the violent wickedness of his human creatures. He was devastated when his own bride, the people of Israel, turned away from him. And when God came back to his people in person—the story of Jesus is meaningless unless that's what it's about—he wept at the tomb of his friend. St. Paul speaks of the Holy Spirit "groaning" within us, as we ourselves groan within the pain of the whole creation. The ancient doctrine of the Trinity teaches us to recognize the One God in the tears of Jesus and the anguish of the Spirit. —N.T. Wright, Anglican bishop and University of Oxford professor

The Cathedral of Saint John the Divine, which belongs to the Protestant Episcopal Diocese of New York, volunteered itself to be turned into a field hospital for coronavirus patients, which will be cared for by Samaritan's Purse health workers, who have offered their services. It will house over two hundred patients with the ailment.

In the statement, The Archbishop of Canterbury, Anglican Consultative Council Chair and the Anglican Communion Secretary General wrote a joint letter to the Anglican Communion. The letter states, "In our prayers, in addition to praying for those who are ill, and for those who are lonely, we should pray for wisdom for those in authority and for strength to be given to medical workers. We should do more than pray. We should also act by heeding the advice of our respective national and regional authorities who are working to contain the virus; and, we should care for those who are unable to care for themselves."

The Church of England released a statement on 5 May 2020 regarding guidelines for churches as nations around the world gradually re-open. The House of Bishops mentioned the possibility of "very limited access to church buildings for activities such as streaming of services or private prayer by clergy in their own parishes, so long as the necessary hygiene and social distancing precautions are taken".

According to official statistics, Anglican churches in North America saw substantial attendance declines even after in-person services were resumed in 2021. Average Sunday attendance in the Episcopal Church "declined 35 percent from the already-depressed levels of 2020," falling to 312,691, 43 percent below the figures for 2019, the last full year prior to the pandemic. Likewise, the Anglican Church in North America saw attendance in 2021 roughly 30 percent lower than prior to COVID. While statistics for the Anglican Church of Canada had not yet been released as of January 2023, Bishop Susan Bell told the Diocese of Niagara synod in November 2022 that congregations in that diocese were seeing worshipers return at rates of 50–65 percent and that diocesan revenue was forecast to fall by 23 percent in 2023. The church's statistician said that the decline in ACC membership (not attendance) accelerated from about 2.5 percent per year to 10 percent per year during the pandemic.

===== Methodism =====
L. Jonathan Holston, bishop of the South Carolina Annual Conference of the United Methodist Church recommended that churches "proceed with worship services—providing increased vigilance regarding cleaning worship areas, providing hand-washing stations, and educating members about social distancing and other preventive measures." On 13 March 2020, Bishop Elaine JW Stanovsky of the Pacific Northwest Annual Conference of the United Methodist Church issued a statement that would be updated no later than the start of Holy Week, which directed "the local churches of any size and other ministries in the states of Alaska, Idaho, Oregon and Washington to suspend in-person worship and other gatherings of more than 10 people for the next two weeks". Many parts of the Methodist Churches, which uphold Sunday Sabbatarian teaching, have transitioned their church services online; ninety percent of the parishes within the Pacific Northwest Annual Conference of the United Methodist Church, for example, are now offering worship via internet livestream.

===== Catholicism =====
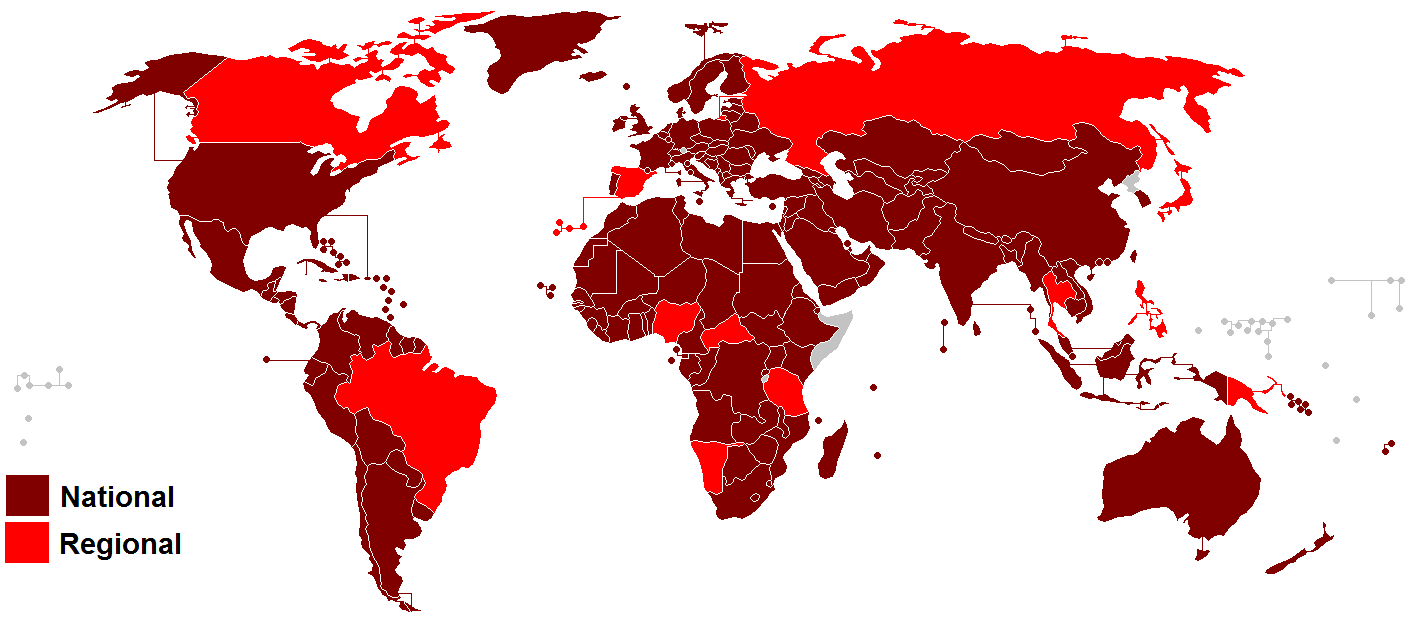
Countries where there were suspensions of Catholic Masses with the presence of the people during the COVID-19 pandemics, at regional level (in red) or national level (in burgundy)

Many churches rang their church bells five times a day for the Liturgy of the Hours as a call to prayer during the coronavirus outbreak. In Spain, many cities canceled their Semana Santa festivities (5–11 April)—normally large events with parades and significant tourism spending—by mid-March as a result of the pandemic; in Seville, it was the first time that the events had been canceled since 1933.

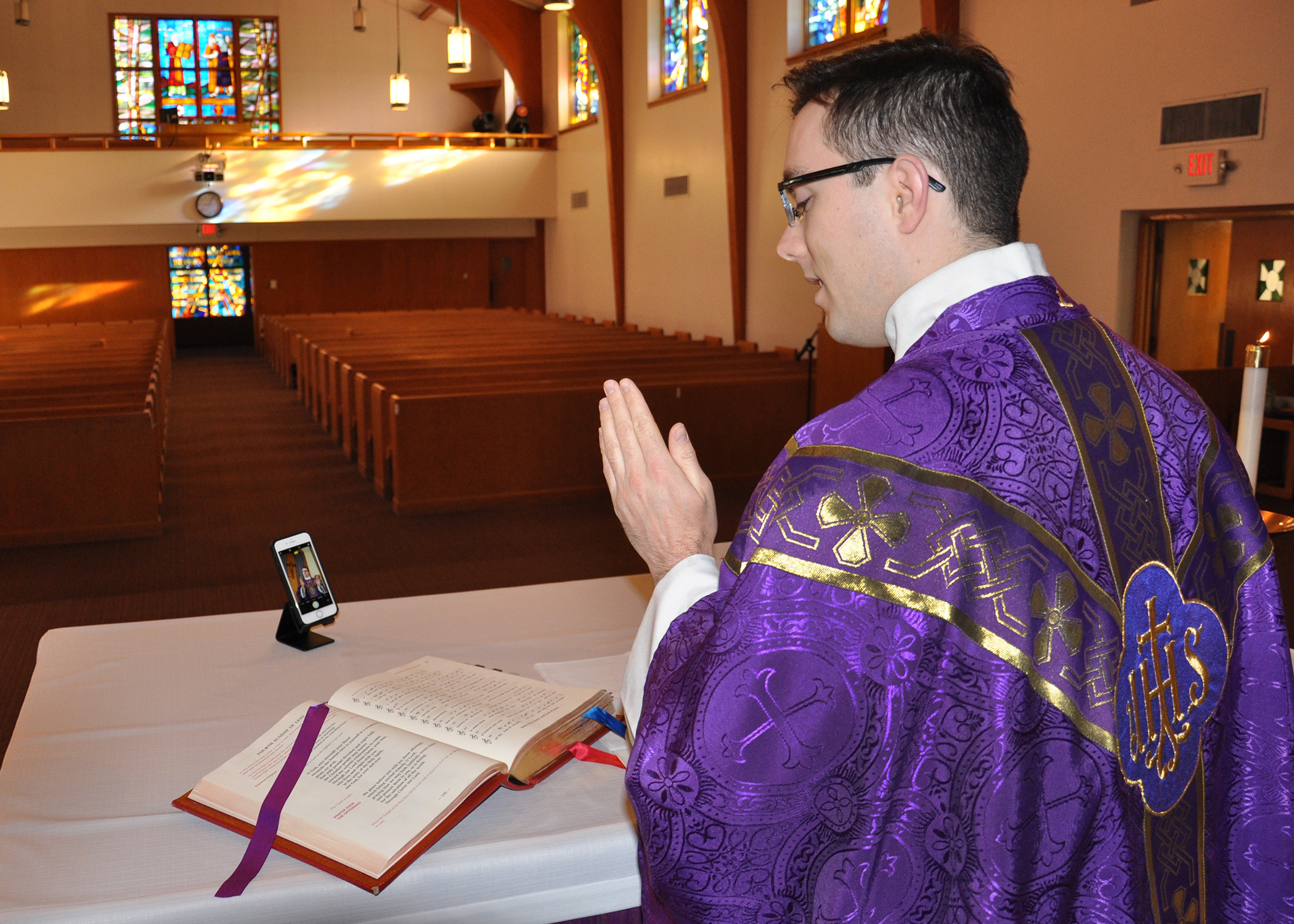
An American military chaplain prepares for a live-streamed service in an empty chapel at Offutt Air Force Base in March 2020.

The Vatican announced that Holy Week observances in Rome, which occur during the last week of the Christian penitential season of Lent, have been canceled. With the Diocese of Rome closing its churches and chapels, Saint Peter's Square is now empty of Christian pilgrims; on the other hand the Archdiocese of New York, though cancelling services, has left its churches open for prayer. Setting an example for churches unable to celebrate public masses due to the lockdown, Pope Francis began livestreaming daily masses from his home at Domus Sanctae Marthae on 9 March. In the Archdiocese of Portland in Oregon, a different approach was briefly taken as Archbishop Alexander Sample instructed parishes to offer more masses so that each mass would be more sparsely attended; however, tightening restrictions on public gatherings in Oregon led to even Archbishop Sample suspending public masses beginning on 17 March.

By 20 March 2020, every Roman Catholic diocese in the United States had suspended the public celebration of Mass and dispensed with the obligation to attend Sunday Mass; the Ukrainian Greek Catholic Church in the United States also suspended public Divine Liturgies, as did the Ruthenian Greek Catholic Eparchy of Passaic.

The Supreme Tribunal of the Apostolic Penitentiary on 20 March 2020 granted plenary indulgences to various people affected by the coronavirus. Additionally, those who cannot receive the sacrament of the anointing of the sick, especially those afflicted with the coronavirus, may receive a plenary indulgence by reciting prayers, especially the Chaplet of the Divine Mercy, on their own, with the presence of a crucifix being recommended.

With social distancing restricting public celebration of the Sacraments, many churches began looking to innovate. Some priests began offering drive-thru confessions. A parish in Quezon City announced an online general absolution via live stream but cancelled the event upon discovering that the priest who absolves and the penitent people receiving absolution must be physically in the same place. Similarly, the Archdiocese of Kansas City attempted to allow confessions to be heard via cell phone but ran into the same issue regarding absolution. Archbishop Leonard Blair wrote in a memo to the U.S. bishops, "With regard to Penance, it is clear that the Sacrament is not to be celebrated via cell phone." The Diocese of Springfield in Massachusetts attempted to allow nurses to anoint patients while priests recite prayers for Extreme Unction but this policy was quickly rescinded because anointing cannot be validly delegated. On the other hand, Johann Pock, the dean of the Faculty of Catholic Theology at the University of Vienna, wrote that if the Pope could impart a "complete indulgence" to the world via television, "why then can't the bishop… celebrate the Eucharist for his entire diocese, with believers in front of their screens actively participating and making this not just a spiritual, but an actual communion with bread (and wine) at the table?"

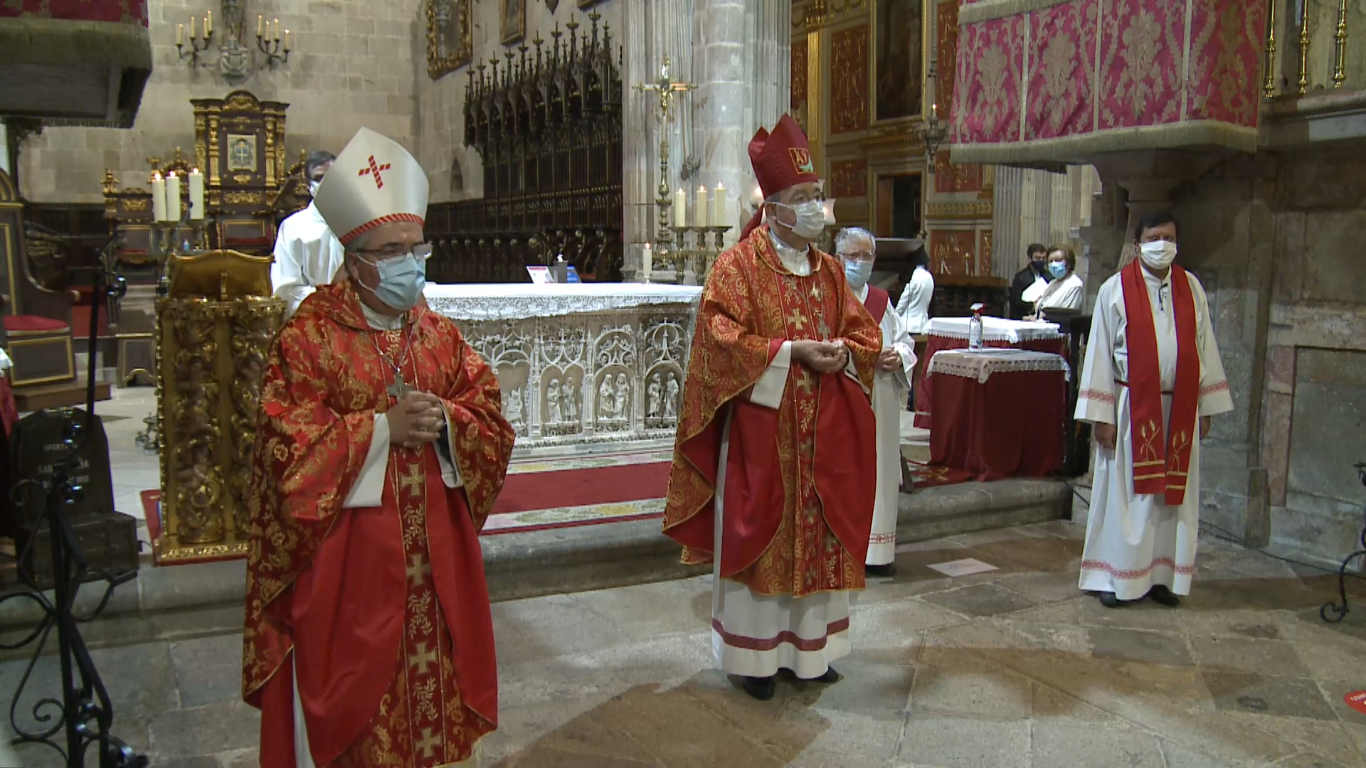
Jorge Ortiga, Archbishop of Braga wearing a protective mask during Pentecost Mass in May 2020

By mid-March the Maronite Church in Lebanon authorized the reception of the Eucharist in the hand, a practice previously not permitted, to stem the spread of the virus. Some parishes allowed for two lines of communicants: one for those who wished to receive traditionally on the tongue and those who wished to receive in the hand. This led to protests from traditional Maronites, including an 8 March incident in an Ajaltoun church where protesters shouted "We are the Church" in response to a priest requesting obedience to Church requests.

As an outbreak began to accelerate in New Orleans, on 24 March 2020 Louisiana governor John Bel Edwards called for a day of prayer and fasting. Bel Edwards wrote that he and his wife "believe in the power of prayer and know, based on our Catholic Christian faith, that prayer coupled with fasting is pleasing to God." The day prior, the Archdiocese of New Orleans announced that Archbishop Gregory Aymond had tested positive for COVID-19 on 23 March. The 70-year-old Archbishop stated that he had not been feeling well and was tested with his symptoms. He stated that he will continue to stream reflections on the crisis to Facebook and the Archdiocese's website.

On 20 March 2020, Pope Francis announced the launch of the Vatican COVID-19 Commission, that would work under the direction of the Dicastery at the Service of Integral Human Development to think possibles solutions for the problems that the COVID-19 pandemic would bring.

On 27 March 2020, Pope Francis imparted the Urbi et Orbi blessing, normally reserved for Christmas and Easter, from an empty Saint Peter's Square following a prayer for the health of all the world. For the prayer service, Francis brought the crucifix from San Marcello al Corso which had processed through the streets of Rome during the miraculous plague cure of 1522.

Catholic dioceses and religious institutes offered church facilities to accommodate healthcare operations and provide housing for the needy in the crisis and the Holy See implemented measures to protect its high-risk residents who were more susceptible to developing complications from COVID-19. In Bergamo, the hardest hit city in Italy where morgues ran out of space, Bishop Francesco Beschi ordered the churches to be used as mortuaries, as "an act of tenderness towards people who die alone and [whose] bodies are likely to remain piled up." Pope Francis asked the Church to welcome and provide refuge to the homeless amidst the pandemic, and on 6 April 2020, Francis donated US$750,000 to mission countries for combatting the COVID-19 pandemic.

In reflecting on the coronavirus pandemic, Bishop Heiner Wilmer of Hildesheim stated that "The [coronavirus] crisis is not a punishment from God" and recalled Martin Luther's question of accessing God directly, suggesting that the faithful turn their focus on the Bible and house churches of early Christianity. Cardinal António Marto, Bishop of Leiria-Fátima called the view that the pandemic was God's punishment "unchristian", and further said that such views could only be justified through "ignorance, sectarian fanaticism, or madness". On 25 March, Cardinal Marto renewed the consecration of Portugal and Spain to the Sacred Heart of Jesus and the Immaculate Heart of Mary, and added the names of twenty-four other countries at the request of their respective episcopal conferences.

Markus Blümel from the Catholic Social Academy of Austria appealed to Catholic social teaching to advocate for a universal basic income on 3 April 2020 in response to the pandemic. In his Easter message on 12 April 2020, Pope Francis echoed this call, writing "This may be the time to consider a universal basic wage which would acknowledge and dignify the noble, essential tasks you carry out. It would ensure and concretely achieve the ideal, at once so human and so Christian, of no worker without rights." Francis celebrated Holy Week and Easter in a nearly empty St. Peter's Basilica.

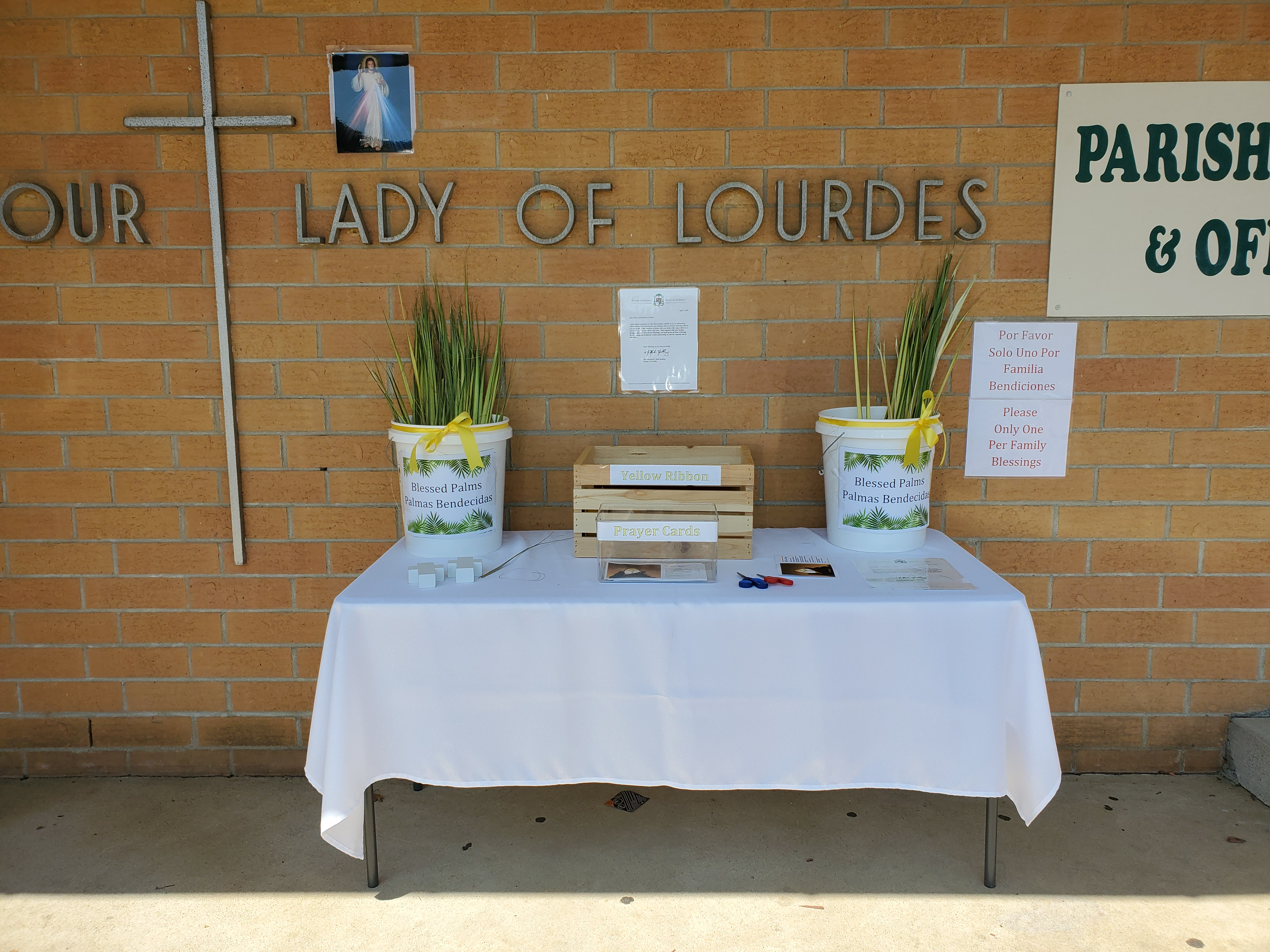
Due to masses being canceled, a table was set up with blessed palms, yellow ribbons, and prayer cards on Palm Sunday at Our Lady of Lourdes Catholic Church in Springfield, Tennessee.

Across Europe, church leaders urged "solidarity and prudence" in response to the COVID-19 pandemic. In some European countries, Catholic masses were completely halted while in others smaller groups continued to congregate. In Spain, the Bishops' Conference "suspended all talks, concerts and catechesis sessions on church premises, and urged Catholics 'with chronic diseases, elderly, weakened or with potential risk, and those who live with them' to follow Masses via the media." In Poland, the Bishop's conference canceled its March plenary. In Italy's northern Bergamo Diocese, clergy tested positive for COVID-19 with six deaths as of March 2020.

In Germany, the head of the German's bishop conference Bishop Georg Bätzing expressed disappointment over the church services ban being kept in place as announced 15 April by Chancellor Angela Merkel. Bätzing emphasized religious freedom and said that he was confident that discussing the matter with the federal government "will very soon lead to a consensus that will make responsible forms of worship in our churches possible again."

Eastern European Catholics supported measures to mitigate the spread of COVID-19, but for some the pandemic "revived painful memories of communist rule." Questioning and resistance also emerged in Western Europe, "where some Catholics have questioned the right of civil authorities to prohibit religious worship." Polish radio presenter Glabisz-Pniewska described the sight of empty church "terrifying," drawing a parallel between the situation and the hypothetical Catholic Church today "if past anti-Catholic hostilities had prevailed." Romanian bishop Virgil Bercea, from a church who experienced persecution under communist régimes, said although church closures were questioned in Romania, he predicted that most critics would have a different reaction if their own families were affected by COVID-19. "We've experienced this before, when having nothing was normal. At that time, it was communism, and now it's the coronavirus. The situation is different, but the realities are much the same." Post lock down in Italy for Church gatherings Italian bishops negotiated an agreement with the government for religious gatherings while maintaining safety measures like masks, gloves and safe distancing, but the Italian government buckled under pressure to drop requirement of thermometers.

The 2020 fiscal report for the Vatican showed a decrease in revenue of about 50%, but the Institute for the Works of Religion contributed more income. Expenses were reduced by $3.88 million. The Vatican also planned to increase their liquid capital in response to market uncertainty in order to avoid selling Church assets in unfavorable market conditions. On January 10, 2022, Pope Francis issued a statement on COVID-19 vaccines, Pope Francis stated that COVID-19 vaccines was a "moral obligation" and denounced "how people had been swayed by 'baseless information' to refuse one of the most effective measures to save lives".

===== Eastern Orthodoxy =====
The Greek Orthodox Ecumenical Patriarchate of Constantinople issued a worldwide suspension of all "divine services, events, and rites, with the exception of private prayer in churches that will remain open, until the end of March".

Patriarch Theodore II of Alexandria, head of the Greek Orthodox Patriarchate of Alexandria, has exhorted clergy throughout the continent to "comfort and support our fellow Africans, teach them ways of elementary health and cleanliness, because most do not have access to clean water. And, as the situation is serious, I recommend that you comply with the orders and decisions of the countries in which you serve".

The Greek Orthodox Patriarchate of Antioch and All the East issued a joint statement with the heads of other churches in Syria and Lebanon declaring "the suspension of all general prayer services, including liturgies, in all churches from today's date and until further notice."

In a joint communique with the heads of other Jerusalem churches, the Greek Orthodox Patriarchate of Jerusalem urged members "to adhere by the provisions and instruction of the civil authorities" regarding COVID-19.

The Russian Orthodox Church has yet to suspend church services, but has implemented precautionary measures to reduce the potential spread of infection. The Romanian Orthodox Church, Serbian Orthodox Church, Bulgarian Orthodox Church, and Georgian Orthodox Church have implemented similar precautions without suspending services.

In a homily given on 29 March, Patriarch Kirill of Moscow called upon the faithful to temporarily refrain from attending church services, and to commit "to strictly following all the regulations coming from the sanitary authorities in Russia,".

====== Serbian Orthodox Church ======
In total, four bishops and the head of Serbian Orthodox Church died from COVID-19 as of July 2021.

Patriarch Irinej, the head of the Church died from COVID-19 on 20 November 2020. He became infected earlier that month after attending the funeral of Amfilohije Radović, the Serbian Orthodox metropolitan bishop of Montenegro and the Littoral, who had also died from COVID-19. Bishop Amfilohije's funeral in Podgorica was held in violation of Montenegrin social distancing guidelines and is believed by officials to be a superspreader event. Following the Podgorica outbreak, Serbian Orthodox priests began appealing to their parishioners to take the virus more seriously. Two more bishops of the Serbian Orthodox Church, Milutin Knežević and Artemije Radosavljević, died from COVID-19 in 2020. Bishop emeritus Atanasije Jevtić died on 4 March 2021, from complications due to COVID-19.

====== Independent Eastern Orthodoxy ======
Patriarch Filaret, former honorary Patriarch of the Orthodox Church of Ukraine, founder and patriarch of the second independent Ukrainian Orthodox Church – Kyiv Patriarchate, contracted COVID-19 in September 2020. He became the first independent autocephalous leader or patriarch in Eastern Orthodoxy to contract the disease. Months earlier, he had stated that the pandemic was God's punishment for same-sex marriage, which is currently not legally recognized in Ukraine.

===== Anabaptism =====
After Ohio Governor Mike DeWine ordered no gatherings of more than ten people, Ohio's Amish steering committee advised all church districts to heed the state's orders, telling Amish "to cancel or postpone weddings, youth and family gatherings until further notice." Amish weekly newspaper The Budget had by 10 April "devoted more than 50 pages to dispatches from Amish communities across the country struggling to reconcile social distancing with a way of life that survives through communal work and worship".

===== Pentecostalism =====
In Mississippi in April 2020, the First Pentecostal Church of Holly Springs successfully led a legal battle against its city's government over a stay-at-home order after local police broke up an Easter service and a Bible study. The church was burned to the ground a month later on 21 May 2020 in a church arson and a message was written in the parking lot, reading "Bet you stay home now you hypokrits [sic]."

===== Nondenominational Christianity =====
Other Christian churches, including non-denominational churches, have begun using livestreams with a chat feature and emphasizing gathering in small groups, such as immediate families, while suspending in-person church attendance. This includes Life.Church's Church Online Platform and an encoder device known as Living As One. Articles are being published to aid those who have not started a livestream in the past. In compliance with local recommendation, churches such as Cornerstone Fellowship in the California East Bay were moving exclusively to online, emphasizing it not being done out of fear or panic, but out of concern for the elderly. In Hong Kong, churches have moved to Life.Church's Open Network Church Online platform as well.

===== Church of Jesus Christ of Latter-day Saints =====
The Church of Jesus Christ of Latter-day Saints has implemented a temporary suspension of all worship services across the globe as a result of the COVID-19 pandemic. On 25 March, all temples were temporarily closed worldwide. Some LDS members were involved in providing aid to international communities where members reside. On 4 April, LDS church President Russell M. Nelson called for a worldwide fast to take place the following Friday stating: "I invite all, including those not of our faith, to fast and pray on Good Friday, April 10, that the present pandemic may be controlled, caregivers protected, the economy strengthened, and life normalized." They described a fast as "going without food or water for either two consecutive meals or 24 hours."

LDS Charities donated food healthcare supplies to 16 countries affected by COVID-19. The church partnered with Project HOPE to offer personal protective equipment or PPEs, Moms Against Poverty and INTERSOS, a disaster relief nonprofit. The LDS church donated protective and respiratory supplies to China and food to local food distributions in the United States.

On 6 May 2020, The Church of Jesus Christ of Latter-day Saints released a video, as they try to decide when worship services will return to gathering after being suspended during the COVID-19 outbreak. "We will continue to be prayerful and proceed with an abundance of caution. Your safety and well-being will always be our utmost concern," said President Russell M. Nelson.

=== Islam ===
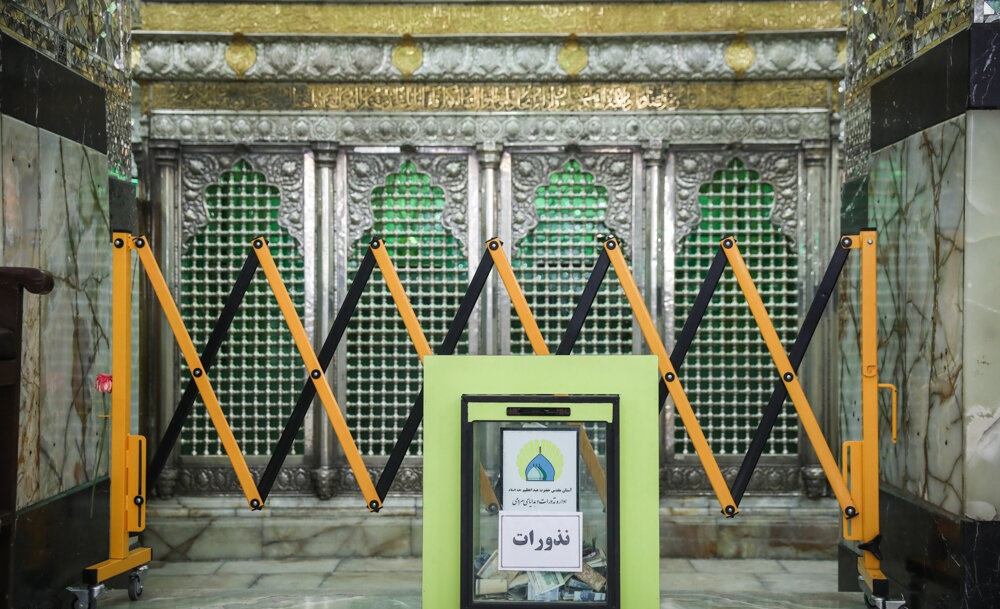
Closed Shah Abdol-Azim Shrine in Rey, Iran

Muslim scholars highlighted the importance of pandemic regulations such as quarantine, social distancing, travel ban, and face masks as according to the teachings of the Prophet.

==== Religious masses ====
Many Muslim jurists came to a consensus on the need to avoid praying in masses, despite congregational prayers being a demand in Islam during normal times.

Prior to lockdown measures, Malaysian officials reported on 20 March that 624 of the nation's 1,030 COVID-19 cases were linked to a gathering organized by the Tablighi Jamaat missionary movement at a mosque outside of Kuala Lumpur from late February.

The Islamic Society of North America, Muslim Medical Association of Canada and the Canadian Council of Imams recommended that congregations suspend gatherings including Friday congregational prayers, which would otherwise be compulsory for all male Muslims. Mosques within the United Kingdom have suspended congregations, including traditional Friday prayers as government documents revealed that social distancing might need to be implemented in Britain until autumn. Burhan Kesici, speaker of the Islamic Council for the Federal Republic of Germany, said that many mosques had financial difficulties due to reduced donations, which are usually collected after prayers.

The Dome of the Rock has closed, though Muslim prayers are still occurring in the Temple Mount. Religious leaders in both Kuwait and Saudi Arabia have strongly urged people to pray in their homes and avoid going to Mosques for regular and Friday prayers. Turkish Directorate of Religious Affairs imposed a nationwide ban on prayer gatherings in mosques, including Friday prayers. Imam Reza Shrine, Fatima Masumeh Shrine, Shah Abdol-Azim Shrine and Jamkaran Mosque in Iran were closed temporarily. Friday prayers were also suspended in Iran.

In Southeast Asia, mosques have closed in Malaysia, Singapore and Brunei. The Indonesian Ulema Council issued a fatwa advising Muslims to pray at home and avoid mosques where the disease had spread severely.

A Tablighi Jamaat event in Delhi, India was claimed to have contributed to a cluster of more than 900 cases nationwide. However, experts from Mahatma Gandhi Memorial Medical College in Indore stated that they have no data to link the spread of the pandemic to the congregation. There were several fake news and misreports of Tablighi members not cooperating with authorities, misbehaving with medical personnel, hiding their travel history and going into hiding, while police authorities in some states had announced set up bounties for information regarding the attendees. This incident also led to a rise in Islamophobic and communal sentiments in India. A large number of cases in Southeast Asia were tied to another large Tabligh Akbar religious event held in late February 2020. On 19 March 2020, 25,000 people gathered in Bangladesh to listen to "healing verses" from the Holy Qur'an "to rid the country of the deadly virus."

In Pakistan, mosques were allowed to remain open, in midst of opposing pressures of medical fraternity of Pakistan and conservative outlook of clergy and masses. The scientific community criticised this motion, expressing their concerns over how far people will follow negotiated list of rule points in practice and may lead to the continuance of the pandemic. The President of Pakistan mediated a 20-point consensus (ijma) with the clergy, detailing precautionary measures to be followed during festive Islamic religious gatherings during the lock down period.

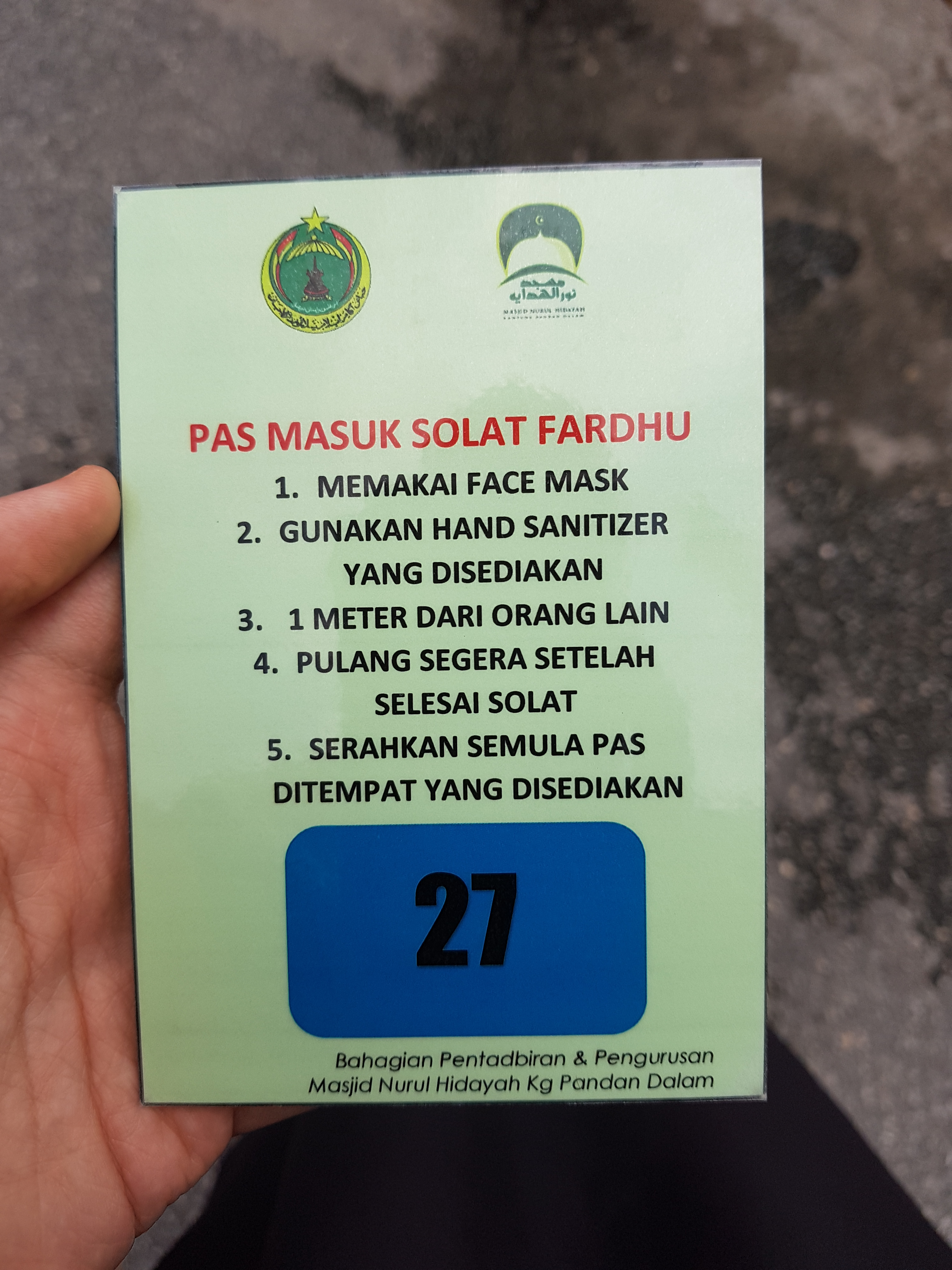
In Malaysia, entry passes were issued by the State Religious Department and given to selected people for Friday prayers during the conditional movement control order.

Mosques eventually begin loosening their restrictions in stages. Malaysia began opening their mosques in stages, starting 19 June when a limited amount of people were allowed to attend Friday congregational prayers with strict procedures and screening. Selected people were given entry passes which were required to enter the mosques, and are subject to strict timing and regulations. Attendees were also mandated to be vaccinated as vaccines began to be distributed. However, the restrictions were occasionally tightened, including complete closure, as cases fluctuated from time to time.

==== Celebration of Ramadan and Eid ====
There is concern that the virus may be hard to control during the travel and gatherings around Ramadan, Eid al-Adha, and Eid al-Fitr. Congregations for Taraweeh prayers during Ramadan were cancelled in several countries as mosques worldwide were shut down. Council of Senior Scholars from Saudi Arabia urged the Muslim world in general to prepare for Ramadan while abiding to precautionary and preventive health measures regarding acts of worship, which includes avoiding gatherings such as communal Iftar and Suhur meals. Muslims in certain countries were unable to afford livestock to slaughter for Eid al-Adha on 31 July 2020 due to price increases as a result of the pandemic. Somalia was one country reported to be impacted, and in parts of West Africa the price of livestock had doubled.

==== Hajj pilgrimage ====
Saudi Arabia closed the Great Mosque of Mecca for Umrah visitors and banned touching Kaaba on 5 March, after which it was partially reopened on 7 March. On 5 March, the Saudi government added further steps towards the Great Mosque of Mecca and Masjid al-Nabawi in Medina, which included a temporary closure of the Great Mosque for sterilisation purposes. On 20 March, both mosques were closed to the public, and the closure continued throughout Ramadan.

The hajj pilgrimage beginning 28 July 2020 only had about 1,000 pilgrims, a sharp decline from the previous year's 2.5 million. Pilgrims were restricted to those already in Saudi Arabia between the ages of 20 and 50 years of age who had been approved as part of an online screening process. They were required to agree to follow strict protocols including quarantine before and after the hajj.

=== Judaism ===
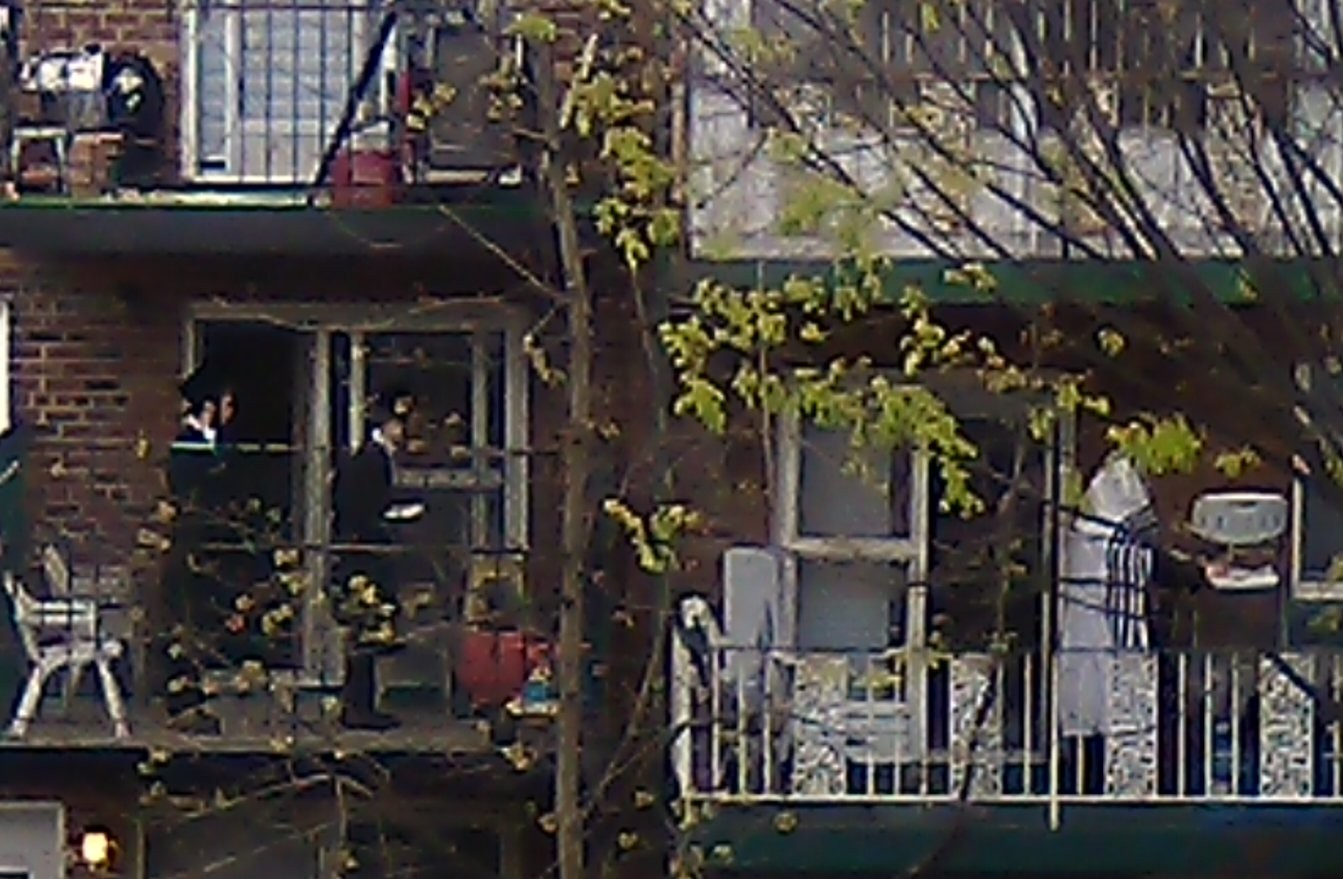
Orthodox Jews praying on their porches due to closure of Synagogues. April 2020 in Borough Park, Brooklyn

At the Western Wall, thousands of Jews gathered to pray on 15 February for an end to the coronavirus pandemic and this was led by Chief Rabbi of Safed Shmuel Eliyahu. By 12 March, when following a police request Israel's chief rabbis David Lau and Yitzhak Yosef instructed observant Jews to avoid visiting the holy site, few people continued praying there. However, even when the government prohibited collective prayings with a minyan (public prayer quorum of 10 people or more) on 30 March, a special exemption was provided so that prayers could continue at the Western Wall three times a day.

Many gatherings related to the Jewish celebrations of Purim and Passover were canceled due to the COVID-19 pandemic.

The Rabbinical Council of America, speaking on behalf of Orthodox Judaism, issued a guideline stating that "public gatherings in synagogues and schools should be severely limited". The Rabbinical Assembly, speaking for Conservative Judaism, stated that "Protecting human life overrides almost every other Jewish value" and recommended that weddings be postponed.

Chief Rabbi Warren Goldstein suspended South Africa Synagogues.

The chief rabbi in the United Kingdom advised the suspension of Jewish worship in synagogues.

Other religious leaders called for introspection and improvement.

=== Hinduism ===
On the occasion of Ram Navami, Temple Ram Mandir in the heart of Bhubaneswar is seen deserted.

The festival of Panguni Uthiram, which is usually associated with processions, was canceled due to the COVID-19 pandemic. Nepal government has given permission to only 25 pilgrims at once in the holy Pashupatinath Temple in Kathmandu, Nepal.

On 9 March 2020, thousands of devotees participated in Attukal pongala, a festival where offerings are made to a Hindu goddess, despite the "high alert" issued by the state government in India.

The Hindu festival of Holi was celebrated with caution before governments started enforcing lockdowns Other Hindu festivals such as Navaratri, Ram Navami, Hanuman Jayanti, and various regional Hindu new year days such as Vaisakhi, Nyepi, Ugadi, Gudi Padwa, Bohag Bihu, Vishu, Pahela Baishakh, Jude Sheetal, Pana Sankranti, Navreh, Cheti Chand, Puthandu, Aluth Avurudda, Sajibu Nongma Panba, Bwisagu, and Mesha Sankranti have to all be celebrated at home by Hindus around the world due to the strict lockdown in India and elsewhere. Prayer services have been live-streamed for viewers to watch at home.

On 2 April 2020, thousands of devotees assembled in temples in various parts of West Bengal on the occasion of Ram Navami ignoring social distancing norms prescribed by the government during the ongoing nationwide lockdown period.

Ganesh Chaturthi celebration was also widely impacted in India. In Mumbai, which is the epicenter of the festival, saw a muted version of the festival. There were height restrictions placed on the idols placed by mandals, to not exceed 4 feet. This was also done keeping in mind the city's corporation creating over 100 artificial ponds for immersion to avoid large crowd gathering at centralised areas. The most popular mandal Lalbaugcha Raja conducted a blood donation camp throughout the festival and did not install an idol for the first time since its 86 years of ritual.

Despite concerns surrounding the possibility of a second wave of COVID-19 in the country, the Hindu spring festival of Holi on 29 March 2021 was met with large crowds, with many of them flouting health and safety guidance such as social distancing.

=== Jainism ===
Mahavir Jyanti, the major festival of Jains associated with the birth of Lord Mahavira that falls on 6 April 2020 is usually celebrated by taking out large Procession has been cancelled throughout the country and the followers of the religion have been instructed to carry religious rituals at home by the religious leaders.

=== Sikhism ===
The Sikh Coalition recommended the cancelling of services at gurdwaras. Additionally, many Sikh gurdwaras have suspended the offering of free food to gurudwara visitors and decided to broadcast the reading of scriptures on live stream. The Central Sikh Gurdwara Board has recommended that elderly Sikhs stay at home, though it has permitted weddings that have been scheduled to proceed. The Nagar Kirtans associated with the holiday of Vaisakhi in the spring have also been suspended or postponed.

The Sikh Center of New York prepared more than 30,000 home-cooked meals for Americans in self-isolation amid the novel coronavirus outbreak. The Sikh community was approached by New York's Mayor office for food packages that were handed out to several distributing federal agencies in the area.

Shiromani Gurdwara Parbandhak Committee offered a helping hand to treat coronavirus-positive patients at its hospitals. Delhi Sikh Gurudwara Management Committee provided its rooms to hospital staff as they were facing harassment at the hands of landlords and neighbours.

=== Buddhism ===
Buddhists in Singapore and around the world adapted, observing Vesak Day virtually for the first time. In the morning of Vesak, several Buddhist temples and centres kicked off the online celebrations – hosting morning puja, guided meditation and talks. Puja is a reflective ritual that is meant to deepen one's appreciation of Buddha and his teachings and calm one's mind.

Thailand's Sangha Supreme Council has ordered all temples under its jurisdiction both in the country and overseas to suspend all religious rituals for the Visakha Bucha Day, to prevent the spread of the COVID-19. However, a religious service held at Wat Bowonniwet Vihara will be broadcast live on the temple's Facebook page. The service will begin at 7 pm with monks circling the temple with lighted candles, followed by a sermon from the abbot and prayers until the morning of the following day.

The Cultural Corps of Korean Buddhism, which allows visitors to experience monastic life in one hundred and thirty-seven temples, has suspended that program.

The Buddhist Churches of America have cancelled services for the spring Higan holiday and other events at many of their temples.

The Dalai Lama expressed in a Time magazine article that there is a need to fight the crisis with compassion. The Buddhist spiritual leader emphasized "from the Buddhist perspective we have the capacity to use our minds to conquer anger and panic and greed." He stated, "The outbreak of this terrible coronavirus has shown that what happens to one person can soon affect every other being. But it also reminds us that a compassionate or constructive act – whether working in hospitals or just observing social distancing – has the potential to help many."

Venerable Phra Paisal Visalo, a respected monk in Theravadin tradition, offers a Buddhist perspective on this turbulent situation, "We have to find a careful balance between carelessness and craziness. We should be aware that the coronavirus is not the only dangerous virus that is spreading in our society. Fear is also harming our minds and affecting our humility, causing us to become selfish and to look down on those who are infected. Therefore, recognizing that we need to act to prevent COVID-19 from infecting our body, we should also ensure that we prevent our fear of COVID-19 from infecting our mind. Let's support each other on both levels. This situation has great potential to help each of us to reduce our selfish behaviors and attitudes and increase our generosity in support of each other. We need to stay connected and encourage people to express their goodness from within, which ultimately helps others."

=== Unitarian Universalism ===
The national office of the Unitarian Universalist Association of Congregations is strongly recommending that congregations plan for ongoing virtual gathering and operations through May 2021. This will apply to worship, events, committee meetings, staff meetings, one-on-one visits, rites of passage, and more. While smaller gatherings may be able to resume sooner if conditions improve, planning for virtual operations that could continue for a full year is advisable.

=== Druze ===
Ziyarat al-Nabi Shu'ayb is a Druze festival called Ziyara celebrated between 25 and 28 April which is officially recognized in Israel as a public holiday. Mowafaq Tarif, the current spiritual leader of the Druze community in Israel, announced that the traditional festivities of the Ziyarat al-Nabi Shu'ayb were canceled for the first time in the history of the Druze community due to the COVID-19 pandemic.

== Legal issues ==
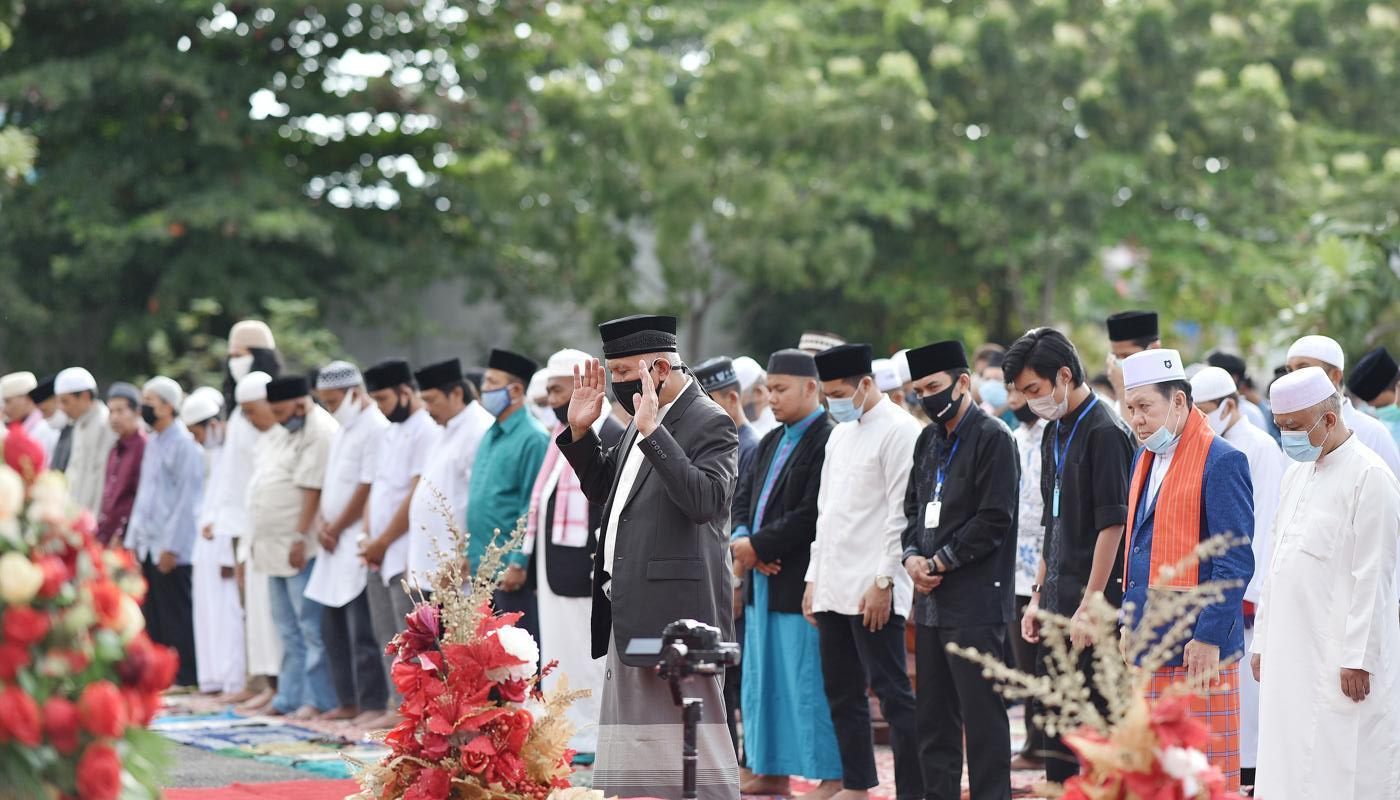
Muslims wearing face masks gather for the Eid al Adha prayer in Indonesia.

While many religious organizations suspended in-person services, activities and events, some gatherings happened despite advice or regulations to not meet in large groups. Some governments exempted religious organizations from the requirements on the number of people allowed to be present at in-person gatherings during the COVID-19 pandemic.

During the COVID-19 pandemic, limitations on religious activities is not only the problem of China and United States. Based on Pew Research Center research, many countries implemented restrictions on religious gatherings. Some countries even enforce public health regulation through arrests, detentions or other coercive. Some groups cooperated with the government in implementing epidemic prevention measures. Others criticize these regulations violate religious freesom or unfairly targeted them. These phenomenons show that the debate on religious law were not only about the religion itself but were also related to the tensions between public health policy, state authority and religious freedom.

Research shows that the conflicts between governments and religious groups are mainly caused by the tension between religious freedom and public health measures. Governments usually restrict large-scale religious gatherings on the grounds of "public health". However some groups believe these restrictions limit their religious freedom, and are unfair. In addition, the conflicts are also related to the level of trust in the government. When religious groups have low trust in government policies, they are more likely to produce question or resist, which can increased social tensions.

=== United States ===
The First Liberty Institute, a non-profit legal firm based in the United States, has issued guidance for religious institutions related to the suspension of their work during the COVID-19 pandemic.

California reported over 100,000 confirmed cases of coronavirus (COVID-19) and more than 4,000 deaths. To protect public health, the state ordered that nonessential retail and worship services halt for more than two months. California Governor Gavin Newsom, a Democrat, issued an order limiting congregations to the lower of 100 attendees or 25% of capacity. South Bay United Pentecostal Church sued to remove the limits, stating that its services typically attract 200 to 300 congregants. Noting that "Similar or more severe restrictions apply to comparable secular gatherings, including lectures, concerts, movie showings, spectator sports and theatrical performances, where large groups of people gather in close proximity for extended periods of time," the United States Supreme Court upheld the state's right to impose limits on congregations as well as secular activities in the protection of public health. The Court held that "Although California's guidelines place restrictions on places of worship, those restrictions appear consistent with the Free Exercise Clause of the First Amendment... "

In April 2020, the United States Justice Department stated that the "government may not impose social restrictions on religious activity that do not also apply to similar nonreligious activity" in response to the citation of Temple Baptist Church members in Greenville, Mississippi for holding parking lot worship services. The congregants listened to the church sermon over car radios while remaining in their cars. The Greenville churchgoers were fined $500 per person. The Justice Department emphasized religious freedom in the response of any state of local government to their COVID-19 responses and sided with the church.

In July 2020, a federal judge blocked religious restrictions in New York State where they were limited to 25% while others operated at 50%. Governor Andrew Cuomo and NYC Mayor Bill de Blasio were sued by Jewish and Christian groups alleging religious discrimination. In October, Mayor Bill de Blasio apologized to the Orthodox Jewish community for his handling of the pandemic. On Thanksgiving Eve, the U.S. Supreme Court blocked additional religious restrictions imposed by Cuomo for areas with high infection rates. Cuomo described the decision as "irrelevant" and "really more an opportunity for the court to express its philosophy and politics." See Judicial activism in the United States.

=== China ===
The government of China, which upholds a policy of state atheism, used the COVID-19 pandemic to continue its antireligious campaigns, demolishing Xiangbaishu Church in Yixing and removing a Christian cross from the steeple of a church in Guiyang County. In Shandong, "officials issued guidance forbidding online preaching, a vital way for churches to reach congregants amid both persecution and the spread of the virus".

== Research ==
On 8 March 2020 Italian scholars of law and religion at the Association of Academics of the Legal Regulation of the Religious Phenomenon started a research project, coordinated by Professor Pierluigi Consorti of the University of Pisa. They set up a website for collecting documents and brief comments about religion, law and the COVID-19 emergency.

Attendance at religious services has seen some shifts, with virtual participation in worship services declining as in-person attendance rebounded and then plateaued. Pew Research Center has conducted a survey concluding the following: As of November 2022, 12% of Americans reported participating only virtually in the past month, a decrease from 27% at the pandemic's outset, while 16% attended only in person, up from 4% in 2020. Despite the reopening of congregations, the total share of U.S. adults participating in religious services remained around four-in-ten. Demographic differences in attendance patterns were evident, with white evangelical Protestants consistently more likely than other groups to attend services in person and Black Protestants the most likely to participate in services virtually.

== See also ==
- Impact of the COVID-19 pandemic on education
- Impact of the COVID-19 pandemic on politics
- Impact of the COVID-19 pandemic on sports
- Impact of the COVID-19 pandemic on cinema
- Impact of the COVID-19 pandemic on aviation
- Impact of the COVID-19 pandemic on science and technology
- Travel restrictions related to the COVID-19 pandemic

== Bibliography ==
- Biswas, Debleena (2021). "Belief System, Deity, and Pandemics: A Sociological Analysis". In Saptarshi Chatterjee (ed.). COVID-19: Tackling Global Pandemics through Scientific and Social Tools. Academic Press. pp. 109–113. doi:10.1016/B978-0-323-85844-1.00011-8. ISBN 978-0-323-85844-1. S2CID 244097717.
