= Gregory Price Grieve =

American historian

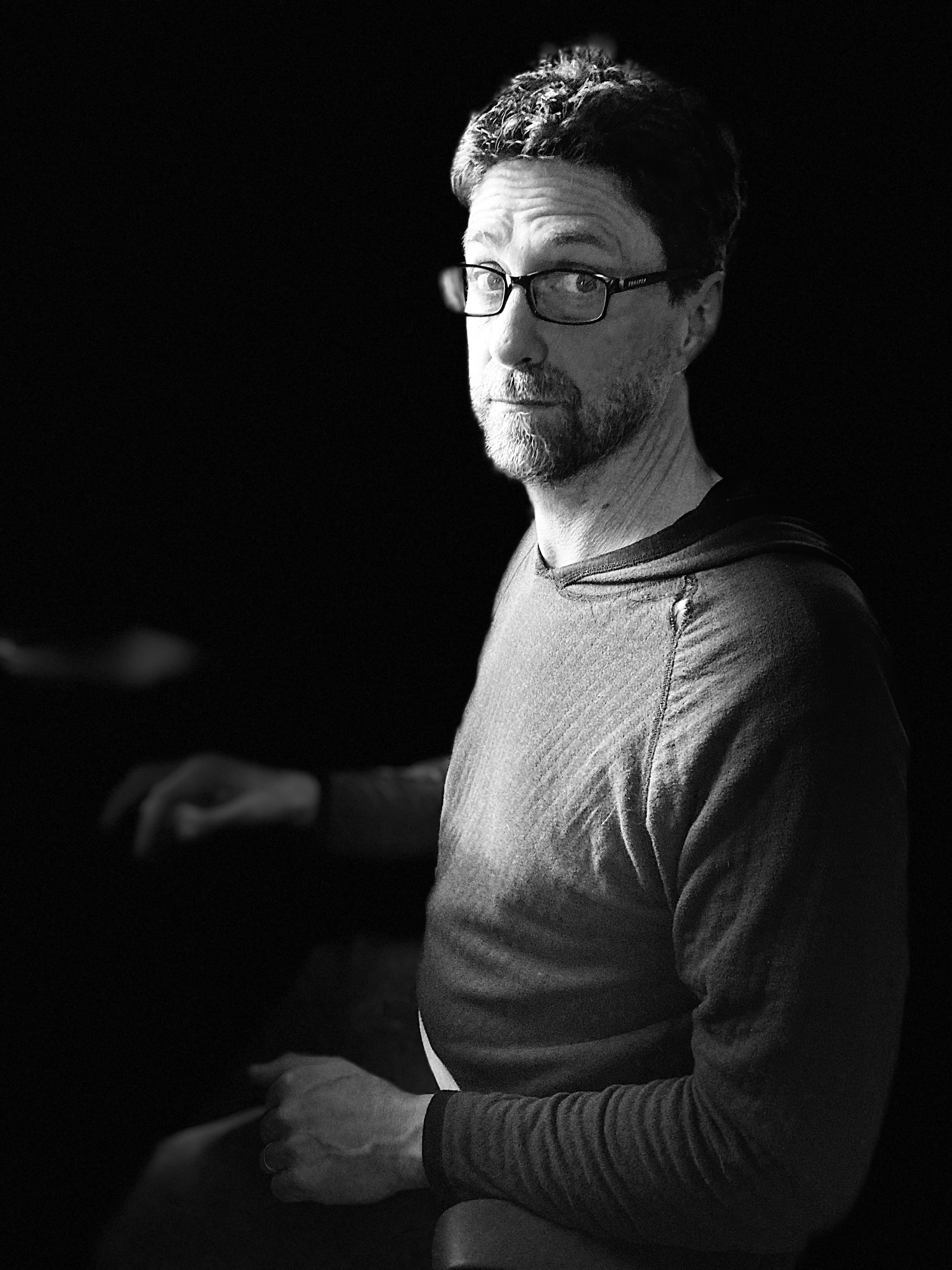
- Occupations: Historian of religions, academic and researcher
- Awards: Fulbright-Hays Doctoral Dissertation Research Fellowship; Social Sciences and Humanities Research Council of Canada; Excellence in Teaching Award, North Carolina Board of Governors

Academic background
- Education: B.A, Film Studies; Ph.D., Divinity
- Alma mater: San Francisco State University; University of Chicago

Academic work
- Institutions: University of North Carolina at Greensboro

Gregory Price Grieve is an American historian of religions, academic and researcher. He is a Professor and Head of the Religious Studies Department at The University of North Carolina at Greensboro.

Grieve researches digital religion, particularly the study of video games and the Problem of Evil. His research also concerns everyday religious practice, specifically Buddhist, Hindu, Christian, and neo-Pagan practices. His research projects primarily focus on online Zen Buddhism, religion in Nepal as well as religion in digital games. He has authored five books, as well as book chapters and journal articles. His monograph, Cyber Zen: Imagining Authentic Buddhist Identity, Community, and Practices in the Virtual World of Second Life focuses on online silent meditation.

Grieve is a founding member of the International Academy for the Study of Religion and Digital Games. He is the editor of Routledge's Studies in Religion and Digital Culture, and De Grunter's Series on Digital Humanities and Religion.

== Education ==
Grieve studied at San Francisco State University and graduated with a B.A. degree in film studies in 1987. He then enrolled at University of Chicago and obtained his master's degree in General Studies in the Humanities in 1993 and in History of Religions in 1994. He earned his Doctoral degree in divinity from the same institute in 2002.

== Career ==
Grieve held appointment as a lecturer at The Graham School of Humanities at University of Chicago in 1998. He then joined DePaul University in 2001 as a lecturer at Department of Religious Studies. In 2002, he was appointed by University of North Carolina at Greensboro as assistant professor at Department of Religious Studies. He was promoted to associate professor in 2008 and to Professor in 2015. Grieve is the Head of the Department of Religious Studies at University of North Carolina at Greensboro. In 2023 he became the executive director of the Department of Liberal and Professional Studies, which, as of 2024, houses religious studies as a concentration.

== Research ==
Grieve researches digital religion, and has particularly worked on video games and the Problem of Evil. His research also focuses on everyday religious practice, specifically Buddhist, Hindu, Christian, and neo-Pagan practices.

Grieve has authored Cyber Zen: Imagining Authentic Buddhist Identity, Community and Practices in the Virtual World of Second Life, and Retheorizing Religion in Nepal (Religion/Culture/Critique), and is the co-editor of several books, including Buddhism, the Internet, and Digital Media: The Pixel in the Lotus, Religion in Play: Finding Religion in Digital Gaming, and Historicizing 'Tradition' in the Study of Religion.

=== Religion and digital religion ===
Grieve focused on the paradox that neo-Paganism is a "self-proclaimed nature religion, which pervades cyberspace" and answered this paradox in his study. He emphasized the ability of neo-Pagan practitioners to imagine a religious community which is not dependent on presence, but is sustained by the notion of a religious 'energy' which is created and circulated by 'personal rituals’. He also highlighted their 'feeling of energy' which binds them together in cyberspace, and enables them to imagine a virtual religious community. Furthermore, he documented second life residents and religious cloud communities using the cardean ethnographic method, and explored the Buddhist informed ethnography of the virtual world of second life using the middle way method.

In his book entitled, Cyber Zen: Imagining Authentic Buddhist Identity, Community, and Practices in the Virtual World of Second Life, Grieve explored the Buddhist practices in context of the online virtual world of Second Life, and described how Second Life Buddhist admire form communities, locations, identities, and practices that are both products of and responses to contemporary Network Consumer Society. In 2019, Calvin Mercer reviewed the book writing that "Second Life Zen has only a family resemblance to canonical Buddhism, but that it is authentic Buddhism nonetheless, because users do existentially explore and create alternative identities and communities."

Grieve published a paper in 2010 and discussed a Cardean Ethnographic research method that emerged from two years of study in Second Life's Zen Buddhist cloud communities. Through this method, he theorized the virtual world as desubtantialized and the worlds opened up by cyberspace as nondualistic.

=== Video games and religion ===
In his study regarding video games and religion, Grieve discussed the importance of value formations in terms of understanding how gamevironments generate meaning and reflect broader social and cultural discourses and how this is connected to religion. He along with co-authors studied the gamevironments of Far Cry 5’s mission Paradise Lost, and proposed a theory of value formations. In 2017, he conducted research focused on the role of video games regarding the construction of cultural heritage and national identities. He conducted interviews with individual game developers and game development companies in India, Japan, Nepal and the Philippines, and investigated the interpretations and constructions of cultural heritage in context of video games. Grieve determined key perspectives in video gaming and religion, and highlighted the methodological approaches regarding the field of religion and digital games studies, the role religion plays in mainstream games, and the way gaming can be seen as a form of “implicit religion".

=== Religions in Nepal ===
Grieve used ethnographic material as well as poststructuralist and postcolonialist approaches to Nepali religion to critique and expand religious studies as a discipline. Furthermore, he explored Nepal's Cow Procession and the Improvisation of Tradition, and regarded the "forged" sacrifice as a means for new suburban neighborhood of Suryavinayak to operate and improvise new mandalic space in context of the city's traditional cultic territory. He also focused the history of development, politics, and tourism in bhaktapur, and highlighted Coca-Cola advertisement and road signs in this context. Results of his study indicated that tradition is tied to local culture of a country.

== Awards and honors ==
- 1996 - Fellowship, University of Chicago Brauer
- 1996, 1998 - Fellowship, Foreign Language Enhancement Program
- 1998–1999 - Fulbright-Hays Doctoral Dissertation Research Fellowship
- 2004–2005 - Fellow, Center for Religion and Media at New York University
- 2008 - Fellow, Lloyd International Honors College
- 2015 - Chancellor's fellow, Lloyd International Honors College
- 2016 - Excellence in Teaching Award, North Carolina Board of Governors

== Bibliography ==
=== Books ===
- Historicizing Tradition in the Study of Religion (2005) ISBN 9783110188752
- Retheorizing Religion in Nepal (Religion/Culture/Critique) (2006) ISBN 9781403974341
- Playing with Religion in Digital Games (Digital Game Studies) (2014) ISBN 9780253012531
- Buddhism, the Internet, and Digital Media: The Pixel in the Lotus (2015) ISBN 9781317950349
- Cyber Zen: Imagining Authentic Buddhist Identity, Community, and Practices in the Virtual World of Second Life (2016) ISBN 9781317293262

=== Selected articles ===
- Campbell, H. A., Wagner, R., Luft, S., Gregory, R., Grieve, G. P., & Zeiler, X. (2016). Gaming Religionworlds: Why Religious Studies Should Pay Attention to Religion in Gaming. Journal of the American Academy of Religion, 84, 641–664.
- Grieve, G. P., & Campbell, H. A. (2014). Studying Religion in Digital Gaming. A Critical Review of an Emerging Field. Heidelberg Journal of Religions on the Internet, 5. doi:https://doi.org/10.11588/rel.2014.0.12183
- Grieve, G. P., Helland, C., Radde-Antweiler, K., & Zeiler, X. (2017). Video Game Development in Asia. A Research Project on Cultural Heritage and National Identity. gamevironments, 102–115.
- Grieve, G. P., Radde-Antweiler, K., Zeiler, X., & Helland, C. (2018). Video Game Development In Asia: Voices From The Field. Gamenvironments, 1–9.
- Grieve, G., Radde-Antweiler, K., & Zeiler, X. (2020). Paradise Lost: Value Formations as an Analytical Concept for the Study of Gamevironments. gamevironments, 77–113.
