= Heidi Campbell =

Heidi Campbell is the name of:

- Heidi Campbell (politician), Tennessee state senator
- Heidi Campbell (professor), communications professor at Texas A&M University
