= Digital theology =

Study of the relationship between theology and digital technology

Digital theology or cybertheology is the study of the relationship between theology and digital technology.

== Terminology ==
In Catholic discourse, the more dominant term has been cybertheology. There has also been the yearly Theocom symposium since 2012 at Santa Clara University, which has explored topics related to theology and digital communications.

In more recent discourse related to digital humanities and digital religion, some scholars have begun to use the term "digital theology." They identify four kinds of digital theology:

1. Digital technology as a pedagogical tool to teach theology
2. Digital technology that opens new methods for theological research
3. Theological reflection on digitality or digital culture
4. The reappraisal and critique of digitality based on theological ethics

They also suggest a fifth aspect of digital theology, which offers a more integrated yet critical use of digital technology in the study of theology and religious belief and practice.

However, as digital theology is a burgeoning field, much of the literature has been critiqued as having a poor understanding of technology and digital culture.

== Digital church ==
Much of the research on digital theology relates to church communities online. Some studies have explored churches which only have online existence, whereas others explore the relationship between how people connect through online and offline communities. Often the conversation is around the nature of Christian worship and how it changes when in an online format.

In the midst of the COVID-19 pandemic, many churches have needed to implement social distancing measures and make choices to run services online. However, these decisions were often made quite haphazardly and for practical reasons, as opposed to more considered choices about the implications of digitizing church services. This has resulted in revived discussions around what it means to be a church and what being socially distant and being online does to ecclesiology.

Digital church has become involved in applications of virtual reality softwares and the creation of metaverse churches. These churches have become more popular due to their ease of access and accessibility from anywhere in the world. They have also faced criticisms, mainly surrounding the debate of metaverse spirituality and what it means for Christianity if its congregations are not gathering in person.

== See also ==
- Hyper-real religion – New consumer trend in acquiring and enacting religion
