= Internet church =

The terms internet church, online church, cyberchurch, and digital church refer to a wide variety of ways that Christian religious groups can use the internet to facilitate their religious activities, particularly prayer, discussion, preaching and worship services. The internet has become a site for religious experience which has raised questions related to ecclesiology.

Some Christian denominations insist that an online gathering is not a real substitute for meeting in person, for example, the Roman Catholic Pontifical Council for Social Communications declared in 2002 that "the virtual reality of cyberspace cannot substitute for real interpersonal community, the incarnational reality of the sacraments and the liturgy, or the immediate and direct proclamation of the gospel", while acknowledging that the internet can still "enrich the religious lives of users".

== History ==
Internet-based Christian communities, better known as "online churches" or "internet churches", began gaining popularity in the early 2000s. Since then, they have prospered dramatically in response to institutional investment, the rise of more sophisticated social media and the emergence of free-access virtual worlds. As online communication became more popular and home computers became less expensive, computer-meditated communication expanded, causing religion to flourish on the Internet.

In the beginning of the internet, many ministries began posting informational and sermon-like messages to visitors. Through the years this method of teaching has evolved in the form of video, audio podcasts and blogs. A 1996 study recommended that church organizations quickly establish their presence in cyberspace, or they would lose touch with many of their parishioners and risk losing the ability to advise them in an era of technological growth. They were essentially urged to establish an electronic presence before it was too late. Had they not made their presence known, the influence of the Church could have been lost to unofficial religious groups.

Many of today's internet churches are descendants of brick-and-mortar churches, offering members an alternative to the traditional physical meetings within a church building. Some, such as the Church of Fools, offer church experiences through entirely 3D virtual reality environments.

Internet churches now exist all around the world; however, they are still criticized for their lack of "human connection". The Methodist Church in the UK affirmed at its 2023 Conference "the possibility of predominantly online churches", subject to further discernment "in respect of online communion".

Recently, internet-based churches have begun to use virtual reality softwares in order to increase their outreach to a wider congregation. These include the creation of metaverse churches which allow user participation from anywhere in the world, by use of an avatar.

== Overview ==
Internet church is a gathering of religious believers facilitated through the use of online video stream, audio stream and/or written messages whose primary purpose is to allow the meeting of a church body of parishioners using the internet.

It includes different aspects of Christian community online, especially by those who view this phenomenon as a subset of emerging church, the developing expressions of the faith in relation to culture change. A cyberchurch is a ministry that exists primarily as a private website, an interactive space on a public website or social networking site.

An internet church describes an institution that has all or a majority of its members meet, connect or congregate, and teaches and practices its religious beliefs, entirely or primarily through online methods. Though there are hundreds of churches which have live broadcasts (and/or rebroadcasts) online (including nearly all megachurches), most would not be classified as internet churches as they also meet in a physical location, and generally use online services as a supplement, primarily to benefit 1) members who due to health or other reasons cannot attend actual services, 2) people living in areas where a church of their denomination or preference does not exist or is too far away to attend, or 3) to introduce prospective members to the church (i.e. a family moving to a new location and wanting to check out churches nearby).

Internet church campuses are the same thing as a traditional church campus, except online. An online churchgoer can attend a Bible study, donate, attend live services, and watch past services, attend conferences, and more.

Members keep in contact with pastors and ministers and collaborate with other believers through web communication tools provided. In some cases members communicate by phone with ministers.

As Internet usage continues to thrive, Christians are using websites, blogs, social networking sites, media services, chatrooms, discussion boards, and other electronic means to provide social connection, education, and enrichment of their faith.

Online church can also offer convenience to those who are too isolated or unable to attend an in-person church service.

=== Online churches ===
The word cyberchurch was used by web-developer Tim Bednar's paper "We Know More Than Our Pastors" which detailed the blogging movement's influence on the experience of faith. Religious pollster and author George Barna used the term in his book Revolution to describe "the range of spiritual experiences delivered through the Internet". Barna sees Cyberchurch as one of the future "macro-expressions" (large scale forms) of church in the future; one that will soon account for one-third of American spirituality, together with other "revolutionary" forms of church.

=== Social networking sites ===
Christians, like many Internet users, are increasingly using social networking sites like Facebook. These sites incorporate much of the technology of blogging but forge more concrete connections between users, allowing them to "message" each other within the system, connect officially as "friends", rate and rank each other, etc. These connections may or may not materialize in the real world, but many people now consider on-line relationships a significant part of their lives, increasing the potential influence of a Christian presence in these environments. Criticism of Christian use of these sites has grown, however, due to prevalence of questionable content and issues of safety. As a result, several Christian alternatives for social networking have been developed. On the other hand, some advocate a missional stance, using social networking sites and networking components of other Internet mediums like blogging, chat, and instant messaging to proselytize new converts and spread the Gospel.

There has been some speculation and experimentation with the idea of starting churches within such "virtual environments". LifeChurch.tv is at the forefront of developing a platform to support the Online "Church Online" Campus offering their platform to other churches. For instance, a quick google search will reveal their platform is being utilized at East Lake Church in Chula Vista, CA The Ridge Community Church in Milwaukee, WI and Seacoast Church in Charleston, South Carolina. True, LifeChurch does not limit themselves and has also used other platforms to plant a cyberchurch within the Facebook community using an "Internet Campus" technology. Likewise, churches are beginning to appear in the Second Life virtual world where people can attend as avatars and worship together. Many of these churches retain elements that can be found in traditional churchgoing, such as sermons (e.g., Internet Chapel). However, they also attempt to adapt to the unique social norms of digital media; users attending these churches are often referred to by their online usernames and there are sometimes chat sessions before, after, and even during services.

=== On-line multimedia ===
Podcasting, streaming audio and video, media downloads, and self-broadcasting websites have made it possible to share the sights and sounds of belief. While religious recordings of different types have certainly existed before, it is the Internet's ability to make these files public for millions of users that has led to the growth and influence of this component of cyberchurch. Now there are millions of audio sermons, conference and seminar recordings, home videos, documentaries, faith-themed films and more accessible on the World Wide Web.

Tech-savvy bloggers can use multimedia to create audioblogs and videoblogs that present experiences, opinions, dialogs, stories, and teachings, creating a more live feel to the blogging experience. Many prominent thinkers, authors, and leaders have blogs that present a podcast or streaming audio of speeches, lectures, or sermons. Video sharing sites like YouTube and Google Video allow anyone with a web camera to post video alongside professional religious movie producers and make it available to millions of users. This allows believers to share ideas about faith in new and creative ways. One example is a church in Orange County, California, where you can share prayers via a web forum before even having met another person. Most of these sites allow people to embed video hosted remotely onto their blog or website, powering video-based communication across the Internet. Christian-specific sites have also recently sprung up to provide faith-based video sharing services.

In more recent years, internet church has taken yet another step forward with the creation of applications. In 2018, celebrity pastor Judah Smith created what is essentially church via an app. This app included forums and the ability to pray for others.

=== Impact of internet church ===
The communication revolution and the rise of online church has effected the perceptions of the Church, as well as had an impact on their structures and modes of functioning. The constant availability of images and ideas, and their rapid transmission across the world, have profound consequences, both positive and negative. This can effect perception and transmission of values, world views, ideologies, and religious beliefs.

One problem in particular is the digital divide. The digital divide creates two groups, the rich and the poor, on the basis of access, or lack of access, to new information and communication technology.

Another concern is the idea that the wide range of choices available on the Internet may encourage a "consumer approach" to matters of faith. Data suggests that some visitors to religious websites pick and choose elements of customized religions to suit their personal tastes, which is recognized as a problem in the Church. There is also the concern that many churches believe the Internet can not replace in-person worship among a community. Critics believe that virtual worship separates followers from spiritual essentials found in brick-and-mortar Christian churches.

=== Other religions ===
All major and most minor Christian denominations are presented through online churches. However, most Jewish, Muslim, Buddhist, and Hindu traditions are as well. In each case, unofficial expressions of these religions as well as individuals wanting to communicate their personal religious and spiritual beliefs have appeared on the medium. The trend has become even more prominent as individuals can now create their own sites much easier than in the past.

== See also ==
- Digital theology
- Religion and the Internet

== Sources ==
- Cyberchurch by Patrick Dixon (Kingsway Publications, 1997, ISBN 0-85476-711-8)
- The internet church by Walter P. Wilson (Word Publications, 2000) ISBN 0-8499-1639-9
- Exploring religious community online: we are one in the network by Heidi Campbell (Peter Lang Publications, 2005) ISBN 0-8204-7105-4
- The Blogging Church by Brian Bailey and Terry Storch (Jossey Bass, 2007) ISBN 978-0-7879-8487-8
- The Wired Church 2.0 by Len Wilson (Abingdon Press, 2008) ISBN 978-0-687-64899-3
- Church of Facebook: How the Hyperconnected Are Redefining Community by Jesse Rice (David C. Cook, 2009) ISBN 1-4347-6534-2
- SimChurch: Being the Church in the Virtual World by Douglas Estes (Author) Zondervan, 2009) ISBN 0-310-28784-7
- Under The Radar: Learning From Risk Taking Churches by Bill Easum and Bill Tenny-Brittian (Authors) Abingdon Press, 2005) ISBN 0-687-49373-0, a book citing Alpha Church for sacraments of Baptism and Holy Communion on the internet, p. 33.
