= Heidi Campbell (professor) =

American scholar of digital religion

Heidi A. Campbell (born August 26, 1970) is a professor of communications at Texas A&M University. She is known for her work in digital religion, and studies related to religion and new media.

== Biography ==
Campbell received her BA in Communication from Spring Arbor University in Michigan (1992), an MTh in Theology and Ethics of Communication from the University of Edinburgh (1997), and a PhD from the University of Edinburgh (2002) where she studied the intersection of Computer-Mediated Communication and Practical Theology. Her PhD thesis was entitled "Investigating Community Through an Analysis of Christian Email Online Communities", which was revised and published as her first book entitled Exploring Religious Community Online (2005).

Campbell was appointed assistant professor of communications in the Department of Community at Texas A&M in 2005, and became full professor in 2018. Since 2010, she has also been affiliated with the Texas A&M's department of Religious Studies.

== Religious-social shaping of technology ==
In her book When Religion Meets New Media (2010), Campbell developed the Religious-Social Shaping of Technology (RSST) approach to examine religious user communities negotiation processes related to media technologies. This approach builds upon ideas drawn the social shaping of technology (SST), which sees technological change and user innovation as a social process. RSST views the interrelationship between religious groups and new technologies as a dialectical process, in which the ethos and identity of a religious groups dictates expectations regarding members’ engagement with new media.

A key premise underlying the RSST is that religious communities typically do not reject new forms of technology outright, rather they undergo a sophisticated negotiation process based on their communal background and beliefs. This informs their response to the various affordances offered by a given technology and potential impacts they perceive it may have on their community. The RSST approach employs four layers of investigation within a community:

- History and tradition
- Core beliefs
- Negotiation
- Communal framing

In her study, the RSST approach was used in a variety of case studies such as the Amish response to technology, Ultra-Orthodox Jewish use of the "Kosher" phone, Christian and Baháʼí use of the Internet, and modern Islamic discourses about computers.

== Digital religion ==
Campbell has contributed to the study of "digital religion", which finds itself at the intersection of new media, religion and digital culture. Often seen as a subfield within Internet studies, digital religion is concerned with not only the practice of religion online, but also in how religious communities interact with media and negotiate their online and the offline existence.

As an effort to create an international interdisciplinary conversation related digital religion, Campbell established the "Network for New Media, Religion and Digital Culture Studies."

== Works ==
- Campbell, Heidi (2005). Exploring Religious Community Online: We are One in the Network. Peter Lang. ISBN 9780820471051.
- Campbell, Heidi (2010). When Religion Meets New Media. Routledge. ISBN 9781134272136.
- Campbell, Heidi (2012). Digital Religion: Understanding Religious Practice in New Media Worlds. Routledge. ISBN 9780415676106.
- Campbell, Heidi A.; Garner, Stephen (2016). Networked Theology: Negotiating Faith in Digital Culture. Baker Academic. ISBN 9781493404391.

Campbell also edited a number of open-access eBooks related to the COVID-19 pandemic:

- Campbell, Heidi, ed. (April 2020). The Distanced Church: Reflections on Doing Church Online. Digital Religion Publications. doi:10.21423/distancedchurch.
- Campbell, Heidi, ed. (May 2020). Religion in Quarantine: The Future of Religion in a Post-Pandemic World. Digital Religion Publications. doi:10.21423/religioninquarantine.
- Campbell, Heidi, ed. (August 2020). Digital Ecclesiology: A Global Conversation. Digital Religion Publications. doi:10.21423/digitalecclesiology.
- Campbell, H., & Grieve, G. P. (Eds.). (2014). Playing with Religion in Digital Games. Indiana University Press. https://iupress.org/9780253012531/playing-with-religion-in-digital-games/
