= Digital religion =

Digital religion is the practice of religion in the digital world. With the rise of digital technologies within religious spaces, there has been increased academic study of such religious practices.

== History ==
Digital religion is the practice of religion in the digital world, and the academic study of such religious practice. It is a modern sub-field of digital culture studies that examines how religious beliefs, rituals, communities, and authority structures are reshaped by online environments, and digital technologies, as well as how the digital and the offline intersect in everyday religious life. In the mid-1990s, "cyber-religion" was a term that arose to describe the interface between religion and virtual reality technologies. Most scholars started documenting how religious groups moved worship online and how religious rituals were performed. By the first decade of the 21st century, the term "digital religion" became more dominant, and has often been studied in terms of religion's developments in the Web 2.0 world. It has tended to also make a distinction between "religion online" (religious practice facilitated by the digital) and "online religion" (religious practice transforms and offers new forms of religiosity in the digital). Scholars have argued that this distinction, while still useful, has become increasingly blurred as users move between offline congregations and online platforms in their everyday religious lives.

As Heidi Campbell's work emphasizes about Digital Religion in the Digital Creatives and the Rethinking of Religious Authority it is imperative to re-frame one's spirituality in conjunction with navigating in an online community. Different religions and cultures may incorporate the use of digital mediums and religion using various reasons and practices to accomplish goals. One common theme in digital religion that they typically all have virtual religious spaces. Campbell's survey of the field identifies several recurring theoretical approaches within digital religion studies, including work on religious community, identity, authority, ritual, and religion in everyday digital life, which together form the core framework scholars use to study how faith operates online. The Oxford Handbook of Digital Religion further expands this scope by examining show religion is shaped by social media, websites, gaming environments, virtual and augmented realities, and artificial intelligence.

Scholarly inquiry into the intersection of modern technology and existential health notes that while conversational artificial intelligence can simulate empathetic language and encourage narrative reflection or meaning-making, it lacks an embodied inner life, raising critical questions regarding authentic presence and the nature of spiritual guidance.

=== Impact of the COVID-19 Pandemic ===
The COVID-19 pandemic was a major turning point in the development of digital religion. When governments imposed lockdowns and restrictions on in-person gathering beginning in 2020, religious communities around the world were forced to move their services and communal activities online in order to continue functioning. A systematic review of 40 publications on post-pandemic religious practice found that livestreamed worship, video conferencing tools such Zoom, and pre-recorded services rapidly became standard models of participation across a wide range of faith traditions.

This shift accelerated trends in digital worship that had been developing for years but were previously limited to smaller segment of congregations. Churches, synagogues, mosques, temples, and other religious communities invested in streaming equipment, social media pages, and online giving platforms, often for the first time. Scholars have noted that even after in-person services resumed, many communities retained hybrid models that combine physical gatherings with livestreams and online small groups, suggesting that the pandemic produced lasting changed in how religion is practiced rather than a temporary adaption.

The pandemic also brought up ongoing debates about what counts as "authentic" religious participation. Some practitioners and leaders raised concerns that online services could not fully replicate the embodied and communal aspects of worship, while others emphasized the increased accessibility and inclusivity that digital formats offered to people who could not attend in person.

=== Online Worship, Live streaming, and Video Conferencing ===
The practice of engaging others in religion using virtual methods such as streaming services, mobile phone apps, social media platforms has expanded significantly in recent years. Livestreamed services, in which a camera broadcasts a worship service in real time, have become one of the most common forms of digital religious participation because they allow large numbers of viewers to attend without logging in or interacting directly.

Video conferencing platforms such as Zoom play a different role. Rather than functioning primarily as one-way broadcasts, they support smaller, more interactive gatherings such as Bible study groups, prayer meetings, catechism classes, religious education sessions, and support groups. Participants in these meetings can see one another, speak, and contribute in ways that more closely resemble in-person small groups, which scholars argue helps sustain a sense of community and belonging that pure livestreams may not provide. The combination of livestreamed large-group worships and interactive smaller meetings on video conferencing tools has become a defining feature of contemporary digital religious life.

=== Social Media and Religious Content Creators ===
Beyond formal religious institutions, social media platforms such as TikTok, Instagram, and YouTube have become important sites for digital religion. Religious content creators use these platforms to share short sermons, scripture reflections, spiritual advice, testimony, and theological discussion with broad audiences. Scholars studying this phenomenon note that these creators often reach people who are not formally affiliated with a religious institution, which has broadened the audience for religious teaching and made it possible to encounter religious ideas in casual, everyday digital contexts.

This development has raised important questions about religious authority. Traditional religious authority has often been tied to institutional training, ordination, or formal recognition within a tradition, but popular social media figures can build large followings without these credentials. Researchers describe this as reshaping of religious authority in which influence flows partly through follower counts, algorithmic visibility, and audience engagement rather than only through established hierarchies. As a result, traditional religious practice is increasingly intertwined with, and sometimes challenged by, content produced on social media, and many institutions have responded by establishing their own official accounts to remain visible in these spaces.

=== Impacts of Digitalization ===
The digitalization of religion has produced a range of impacts that scholars describe as both beneficial and challenging. On the positive side, digital platforms significantly improve accessibility. People who are homebound, disabled, chronically ill, traveling, or living in regions without a nearby congregation can now participate in worship services, religious education, and community life online. Digital tools also make religious content more abundant and more easily searchable, allowing individuals to explore traditions, sermons, and teachings that would previously have required travel or institutional access.

At the same time, scholars have identified several concerns. The shift to online participation can reduce the embodied, communal, and sensory dimensions of worship, such as shared meals, physical greetings, and collective singing in a shared space. Researchers have also noted issues of digital inequality, since older adults and those without reliable internet access may be excluded from online religious life, as well as concerns about misinformation, oversimplified theology, and the influence of platform algorithms on which religious content is amplified.

A 2024 study in the psychology of religion examined how AI-powered religious applications, virtual faith communities and online services are changing religious practice, and the questions they raise about authenticity, inclusiveness and ethics.

=== Virtual Christianity ===
The practice of engaging others in the Christian religion using virtual methods such as streaming services, mobile phone apps, social media platforms. Cyber- Christian spaces engage with people in their congregations, organizations and non-practicers of the faith. Some use technology to hold bible studies, worship services and even as a Christian dating tool. Virtual Christianity is commonly referred to as Virtual Church instead of a direct reference to religious affiliation. There has been an increased application of innovative technologies in Christianity in recent years, including the use of various virtual reality software in the creation of metaverse churches. These technologies have resulted in various criticisms, including questions surrounding what they mean for Christian fellowship and the theology of presence.

=== Virtual Buddhism ===
The practice of engaging others in the Buddhism religion using virtual methods such as streaming services, mobile phone apps, social media platforms. Connelly suggests that it is important to identify the positioning of Buddhists in society and in the virtual world as well. Buddhism approaches a virtual reality through an interdisciplinary approach.

=== Virtual Judaism ===
The practice of engaging others in the Judaism religion using virtual methods such as streaming services, mobile phone apps, social media platforms. In particular the Chabad, a Jewish ultra-Orthodox movement, sheds light on a fundamentalist society interacting with new media, by negotiating between modernity and religious piety.

=== Virtual Hikari no Wa ===
The practice of engaging others in the Hikari no Wa religion using virtual methods such as streaming services, mobile phone apps, social media platforms. Japanese New Religions Online: Hikari no Wa and Net Religion use different forms of technology and as a result of different forms. For instance they use tech for training members and leaders, communication, broadening the reach of their messages, and hopefully to connect with new converts.
