= Cheti Chand =

New year day of Sindhi Hindus

Chetri Chandra or Cheti Chand
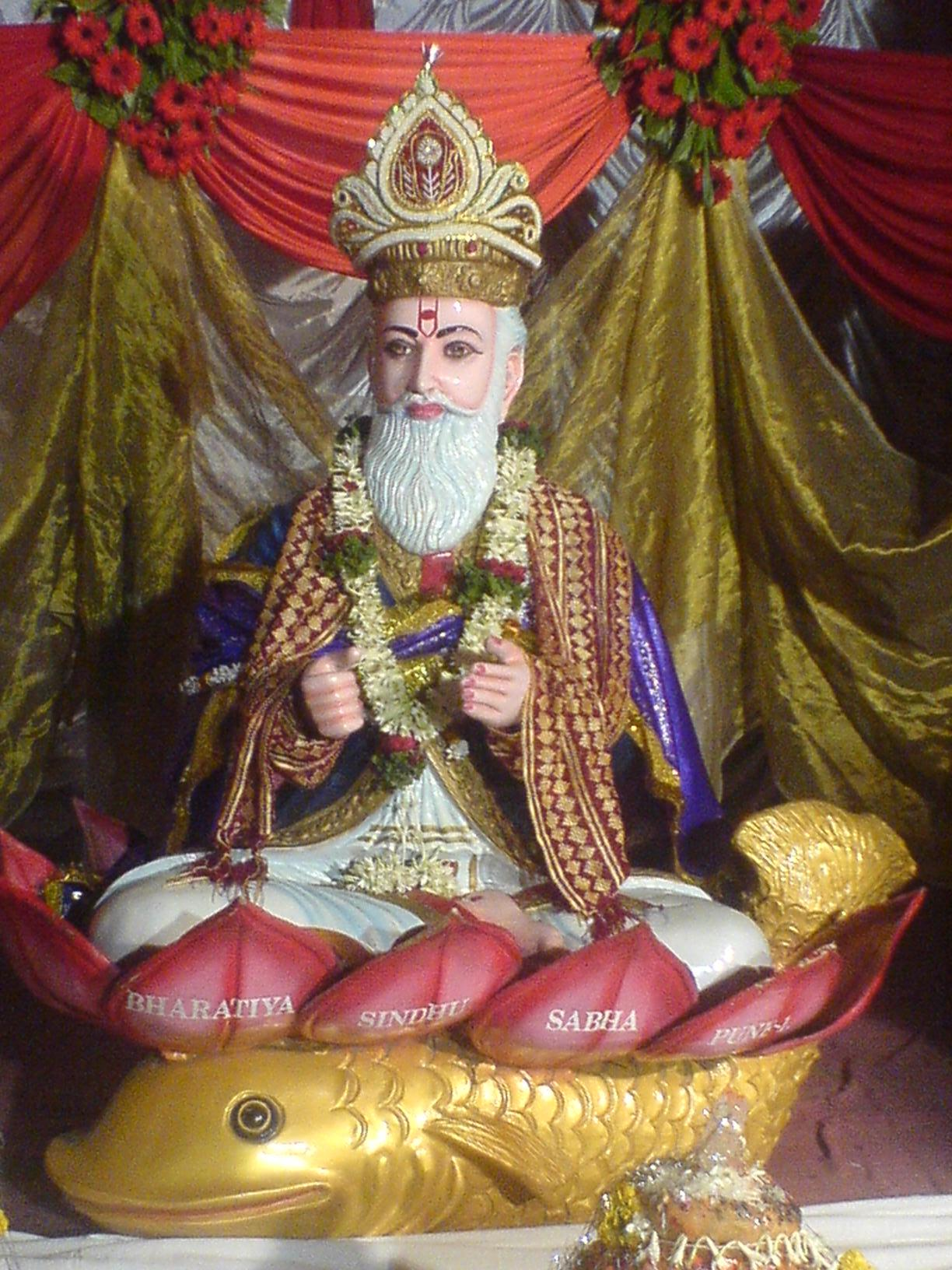
- Jhulelal, the Ishta Devta of the Sindhi Hindus
- Also called: Sindhi new year
- Observed by: Sindhi Hindus
- Type: Hindu
- Significance: marks the beginning of the Lunar Hindu New Year for Sindhi Hindus.
- Celebrations: 2 days
- Observances: Sindhi New Year's Day, mela (fairs), social feast, processions, dancing
- Date: March/April
- Related to: Ugadi, Gudi Padwa

Chetri Chandra (Sindhi: چيٽي چنڊ, Moon of Chaitra) is a festival that marks the beginning of the Lunar Hindu New Year for Sindhi Hindus. The date of the festival is based on the lunar cycle of the lunisolar Hindu calendar, falling on the first day of the year, in the Sindhi month of Chet (Chaitra). It typically falls in late March or early April in the Gregorian calendar on or about the same day as Gudi Padwa in Maharashtra, Ugadi in other parts of the Deccan region and Hindu Samvat Nav Varsha or beginning on New Year in Hindu Samvat Calendar of India.

== Overview ==
The festival marks the arrival of spring and harvest, but in the Sindhi community, it also marks the birth of Uderolal in 1007, after they prayed to the Hindu god Varun Dev on the banks of River Indus to save them from the persecution by the tyrannical Muslim ruler Mirkhshah. Varun Dev morphed into a warrior and old man who preached and reprimanded Mirkhshah that Muslims and Hindus deserve the same religious freedoms. He, as Jhulelal, became the champion of the people in Sindh, from both religions. Among his Sufi Muslim followers, Jhulelal is known as "Khwaja Khizir" or "Zindapir". The Hindu Sindhi, according to this legend, celebrate the new year as Uderolal's birthday.

The tradition likely started with Daryapanthis. During the British colonial rule era, major annual fairs (melas) used to be held in Uderolal and Zindapir (near Hyderabad, Pakistan). In contemporary times, the Sindhi community celebrates the festival of Cheti Chand with major fairs, feast parties, processions with jhankis (glimpse stage) of Jhulelal (an avatar of [Varun dev], similar to Vithoba), other Hindu deities, and social dancing.

On this day, many Sindhis take Baharana Sahib, a representation of Jhulelal, to a nearby river or lake. Baharana Sahib consists of jyot (oil lamp), misiri (crystal sugar), fota (cardamom), fal (fruits), and akha. Behind is kalash (water jar) and a nariyal (coconut) in it, covered with cloth, phool (flowers) and patta (leaves). There is also a Murti (statue) of Pujya Jhulelal Devta. Cheti Chand is a major festival of Sindhi Hindus in India and Pakistan, and also celebrated by the Hindu Sindhi diaspora around the world.

== Months (lunar) ==
Month no.	Name	Sindhi Naskh	Sindhi Nagari	Western months
1	Vesākhu	ويساک	वेसाखु	Mid April – Mid May
2	Jēṭhu	ڄيٺ	ॼेठु	Mid May – Mid June
3	Ākhāru	آکاڙ	आखरु	Mid June – Mid July
4	Sānvaṇu/Srāṇu	سانوڻ/سراڻ	सांवणु/स्राणु	Mid July – Mid August
5	Baḍo	بڊو	बडो	Mid August – Mid September
6	Asav/Asu	آساو/اسو	आसव/अस्सू	Mid September – Mid October
7	Katī	ڪتي	कती	Mid October – Mid November
8	Nahri/Nāhari/Manghiru	نھري/ناھري/منگھر	नाहरी	Mid November – Mid December
9	Pōhu	پوھ	पोहु	Mid December – Mid January
10	Mānghu/Māghu	مانگھ/ماگھ	मांघु	Mid January – Mid February
11	Phaguṇu/Phāgu	ڦڳڻ/ڦاڳ	फाॻुणु	Mid February – Mid March
12	Ceṭu	چيٽ	चेटु	Mid March – Mid April
