= Punjabi calendar =

Luni-solar calendar used by the Punjabi people

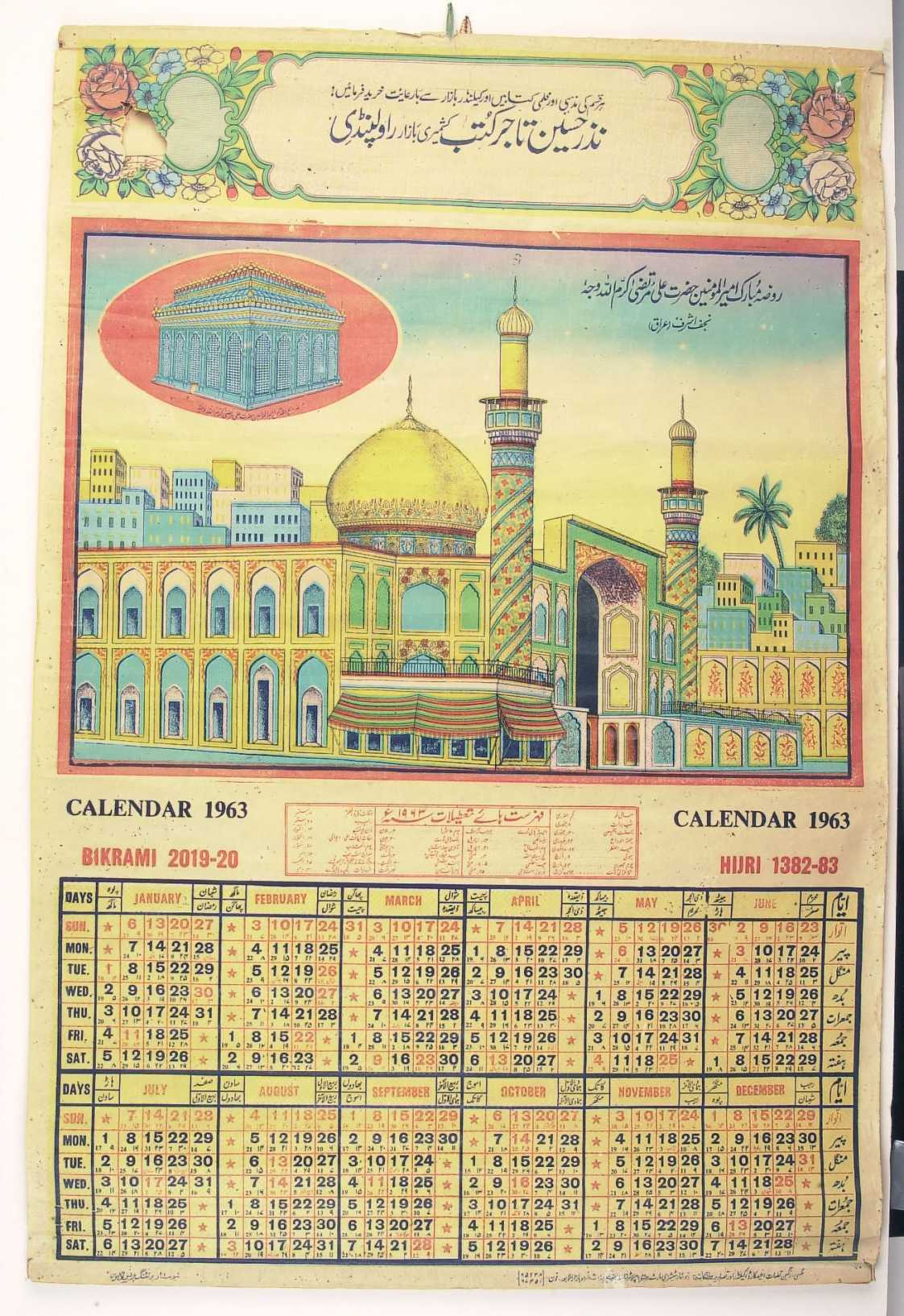
Punjabi calendar for the year 1963 from Rawalpindi, Pakistan. This corresponds with the year 1382-83 of the Islamic era (hijri), as the calendar indicates.

The Punjabi calendar (Punjabi: ਪੰਜਾਬੀ ਜੰਤਰੀ, پنجابی جنتری) is a luni-solar calendar used by the Punjabi people in Punjab, and around the world. Punjabi Muslims use the calendar for agricultural purposes as it corresponds well with the climate and seasons of Punjab while Hindus and Sikhs also use it for religious purposes.

The traditional Punjabi calendar is the Bikrami calendar which is currently only in use by Punjabi Hindus and Punjabi farmers and agriculturalists. Sikhs historically followed the Bikrami calendar but since 2003, the Nanakshahi calendar which uses the tropical years and keeps the calendar aligned with the western Gregorian calendar, has been used. The Nanakshahi calendar was adopted by the Shiromani Gurudwara Parbandhak Committee for Sikhs in 1999. The dates of festivals based on the Nanakshahi calendar are always fixed. The most major Sikh holidays such as Diwali/Bandi Chhor Divas, Guru Nanak Gurpurab, Guru Gobind Gurpurab, and Hola Mohalla are still observed based on the Bikrami calendar. The Punjabi festivals of Lohri, Maghi, and Vaisakhi along with the Sikh celebration of Vaisakhi called Khalsa Sajna Diwas are observed based on the solar calculations of the Bikrami calendar.

Punjabi Muslims also use the Hijri calendar alongside the Punjabi calendar for religious purposes. Many festivals in Punjab, Pakistan are determined by the Punjabi calendar, such as Muharram which is observed twice, once according to the Muslim year and again on the 10th of Harh or the 18th of Jeth. The Punjabi calendar is the calendar followed by the rural (agrarian) population in Pakistani Punjab. (Note: The Punjabi periodicals published in Pakistan print Punjabi calendar figures.)

In Punjab, the traditional Bikrami or Punjabi calendar is based on both the lunar and solar cycles. The lunar calendar used is purṇimānta, or calculated from the ending moment of the full moon: the beginning of the "dark fortnight" (waning moon). Chet is considered to be the first month of the lunar year. The lunar year begins on Chet Sudi: the first day after the new moon in Chet. This means that the first half of the purṇimānta month of Chet goes to the previous year, while the second half belongs to the new Lunar year.

The Punjabi solar new year starts on the first of Vaisakh. The day is considered from sunrise to next sunrise and for the first day of the solar months, the Orissa rule is observed: day 1 of the month occurs on the day of the transition of monthly constellations, or sangrānd in Punjabi. Sandrand is the Punjabi word for Sankranti, the transmigration of the sun from one zodiac to another in Hindu astronomy.

The traditional lunisolar Punjabi or Bikrami calendar uses the sidereal year. The Bikrami calendar days are based on the lunar phases called tithis, thus the festivals based on the lunar calendar fluctuate. The first half of a lunar month is called the Badi Pakh or Nehr Pakh in Punjabi, and Krishna Paksha in Sanskrit. Nehr Pakh and Krishna Paksha both mean ‘dark fortnight.’ The second half of a lunar month is called the Sudi Pakh or Chanan Pakh in Punjabi, and Shukla Paksha in Sanskrit. Chanan Pakh and Shukla Paksha both mean ‘bright fortnight.’ There are 15 tithis in each Pakh/Paksha or half of a lunar month. The first fourteen tithis of each half in Punjabi are Ekam (Pratipada), Dooj (Dwitiya), Teej (Tritiya), Chauth (Chaturthi), Panchmi/Panjmi (Panchami), Shhathay/Chhath (Shashthi), Sattay/Saptmi (Saptami), Attay/Attmi/Ashtmi (Ashtami), Naumi (Navami), Dasmi (Dashami), Giyaras/Ekadshi (Ekadashi), Baras/Dwadshi (Dwadashi), Teras/Trodashi (Trayodashi), and Chaudas (Chaturdashi). The fifteenth tithi of the first half or Nehr Pakh is the Masseya (Amavasya) or the new moon. The fifteenth tithi of the second half or Chanan Pakh is the Puranmashi/Punnya (Purnima) or the full moon.

The Bikrami or traditional Punjabi new year begins on the Ekam of the Chanan Pakh during the month of Chet, or simply the 16th tithi of Chet. Historically, the Indic and Hindu lunar new year was celebrated on the sixteenth tithi of Chet/Chaitra while the Indic and Hindu solar new year was celebrated on the Sangrand/Sankranti of Vaisakh/Vaisakha. In the precolonial era, the first day of the new year was regarded as the sixteenth lunar tithi of Chet and the new year celebrations and fairs continued until the Sangrand of Vaisakh known as Vaisakhi, which was regarded as the first harvest of the year and culmination of the new year celebratory season. The famous new year fairs of the saint Valmiki near Amritsar and the fairs at numerous other Hindu tirthas in Punjab were held over the period starting from the sixteenth tithi of Chet to the day of Vaisakhi. On the two days before the new year, the Chaudas and Masseya of the Nehr Pakh of Chet, Punjabi Hindus would bathe in sarovars and rivers such as the Satluj, Ravi, Jhelum, Chenab, Beas, and Indus to cleanse themselves of the ceding year’s sins. This practice was documented to still be practiced by the Hindus in the city of Ludhiana during the colonial era before the pollution of the Satluj River and its canals.

== Months (Solar) ==
No.	Name	Gurmukhi	Shahmukhi	Western months	Important days based on this calendar
1	Vaisakh	ਵਿਸਾਖ	وساکھ	Mid April – Mid May	Vaisakhi, Guru Har Rai Gurpurab, Guru Angad Gurpurab, Guru Tegh Bahadur Gurpurab, Guru Arjan Gurpurab
2	Jeth	ਜੇਠ	جیٹھ	Mid May – Mid June	Guru Amar Das Gurpurab
3	Harh	ਹਾੜ੍ਹ	ہاڑھ	Mid June – Mid July	Guru Hargobind Gurpurab
4	Sawan	ਸਾਓਣ	ساؤݨ	Mid July – Mid August	Guru Har Krishan Gurpurab, Urs of Waris Shah
5	Bhadon	ਭਾਦੋਂ	بھادوں	Mid August – Mid September	Guru Granth Sahib Parkash Purab
6	Assu	ਅੱਸੂ	اسو	Mid September – Mid October	Guru Ram Das Gurpurab
7	Kattak	ਕੱਤਕ	کتک	Mid October – Mid November	
8	Magghar	ਮੱਘਰ	مگھر	Mid November – Mid December	
9	Poh	ਪੋਹ	پوہ	Mid December – Mid January	Lohri
10	Magh	ਮਾਘ	ماگھ	Mid January – Mid February	Maghi
11	Phaggan	ਫੱਗਣ	پھگݨ	Mid February – Mid March	
12	Chet	ਚੇਤ	چیت	Mid March – Mid April	

== Months (Lunisolar) ==
No.	Name of Month Roman	Punjabi Gurmukhi	Punjabi Shahmukhi	Western months	Season	Lunisolar festivals
1	Chet (Chaitra)	ਚੇਤ	چیت	March-April	Basant (Vasanta)	Hola Mohalla, Chet Naurate, Ram Naumi
2	Vaisakh (Vaisakha)	ਵੈਸਾਖ	وساکھ	April-May	Basant (Vasanta)	Akha Teej
3	Jeth (Jyesththa)	ਜੇਠ	جیٹھ	May-June	Garikham (Grishma)	
4	Harh (Ashadha)	ਹਾੜ	ہاڑھ	June-July	Garikham (Grishma)	Guru Punnia
5	Sawan (Shravana)	ਸਾਵਣ	ساؤݨ	July-August	Baras (Varsha)	Hariyali Teej/Teeyan, Nag Panchami, Rakhri
6	Bhadon (Bhadrapad)	ਭਾਦੋਂ	بھادوں	August-September	Baras (Varsha)	Janmashtami, Guga Naumi
7	Assu (Ashvin)	ਅੱਸੂ	اسو	September-October	Sard (Sharada)	Shraadh, Naurate/Sanjhi, Dusshehra, Gadbade
8	Kattak (Kartika)	ਕੱਤਕ	کتک	October-November	Sard (Sharada)	Karwa Chauth, Jhakria, Dhanteras, Choti Diwali, Diwali/Bandi Chhor Divas, Gowardhan/Bishkarma, Tikka, Kattak Punnia/Guru Nanak Gurpurab
9	Magghar (Margshirsa)	ਮੱਘਰ	مگھر	November-December	Himkar (Hemanta)	
10	Poh (Pausha)	ਪੋਹ	پوہ	December-January	Himkar (Hemanta)	Guru Gobind Singh Gurpurab
11	Magh (Magha)	ਮਾਘ	ماگھ	January-February	Sisiar (Shishira)	Sankat Chauth/Bhugga, Basant Panchami
12	Phaggan (Phalguna)	ਫੱਗਣ	پھگݨ	February-March	Sisiar (Shishira)	Maha Shivratri, Choti Holi, Holi
inter.	Adhik (Adhika)	ਅਧਿਕ	ماس	varies	varies	

== See also ==
- Hindu calendar
- Islamic calendar
- Nepal Sambat
