= Vaisakha (disambiguation) =

Vaisakha (Sanskrit: Vaiśākha) may refer to the following:

- Vaisakha, the second lunar month of the Hindu calendar (April-May)
- Vaisakh, the second month of the Sikh Nanakshahi calendar (April-May)
  - Vaisakhi, Sikh New Year
- Vesak, Buddhist New Year, named after the Pali equivalent to the Hindu month
