= Nanakshahi calendar =

Calendar used in Sikhism

The Nanakshahi calendar (Gurmukhi: ਨਾਨਕਸ਼ਾਹੀ, romanized: Nānakshāhī), or Sikh calendar, is a tropical solar calendar used in Sikhism. It is based on the "Barah Maha" (Twelve Months), a composition composed by the Sikh gurus reflecting the changes in nature conveyed in the twelve-month cycle of the year. The year begins with the month of Chet, with 1 Chet corresponding to 14 March. The reference epoch of the Nanakshahi calendar is the birth of Guru Nanak Dev, corresponding to the year 1469 CE. The Nanakshahi calendar allows for all important dates to occur on the same day as the Gregorian calendar indicates.

In modern-times, Sikhs also use the Gregorian calendar and historically, the Bikrami and Hijri calendars were influential. For centuries, Sikhs used the Bikrami calendar predominantly but the proposal of an independent Sikh calendar first arose in the 1960s by Pal Singh Purewal to help demarcate the religion from Hinduism. By the 1990s, the sidereal-year calendar Purewal created was adopted by Sikh institutions in Punjab, with slight changes by a committee to correct the differences it had with the tropical-year Gregorian calendar. Since 1999, the calendar is used to determine the dates of important Sikh events, holidays, celebrations, and festivals, aside from three, namely Guru Nanak Gurpurab, Vaisakhi, and Bandi Chhor Divas, which are still determined based upon the traditional Bikrami calendar. Other sources also state that the date of observing Hola Mohalla is also based upon the Bikrami calendar still. The Punjabi cultural festivals of Basant and Lohri are also still determined through the Bikrami rather than the Nanakshahi calendar. The celebration of those specific events based upon the Bikrami calendar was done to continue the joint-celebration of these holidays as part of a common cultural tradition shared by both Sikhs and Hindus. The dates of celebrations of all gurpurabs aside from Guru Nanak's are now fixed, with for example Guru Gobind Singh's always being celebrated on January 5. The Shiromani Gurdwara Parbandhak Committee officially approved the Nanakshahi calendar in January 2003. However, the adoption of the calendar has been controversial and its acceptance in the wider Sikh community is an ongoing process.

== Etymology ==
The Nanakshahi Calendar is named after the founder of the Sikh religion, Guru Nanak. The names of the months of the calendar are the Punjabi forms of general Indic month names.

== History ==
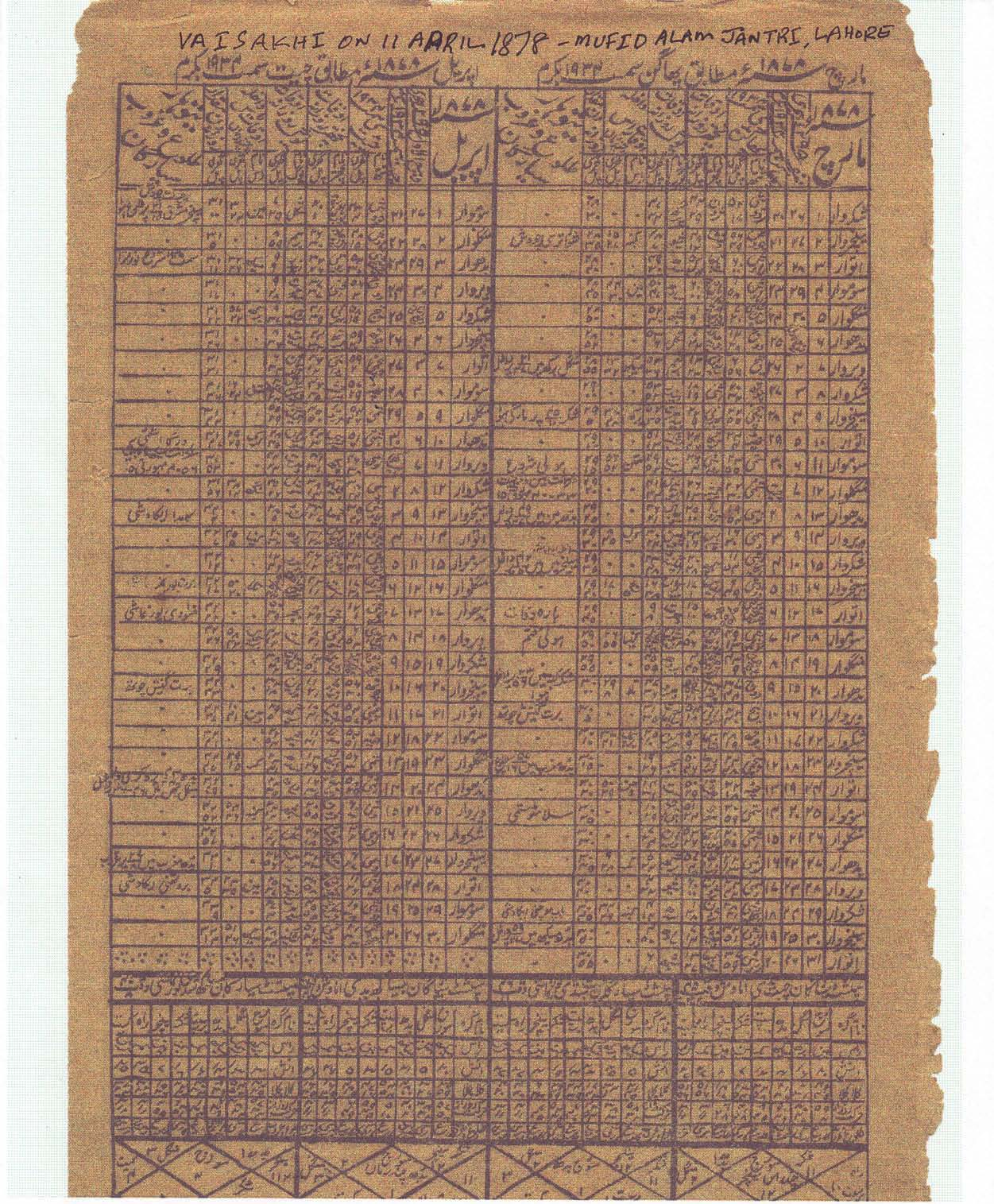
Punjabi calendar, with Vaisakhi marked for 11 April 1878, Mufid Alam Jantri, Lahore, c.1878

The predominant calendar systems in Northern India at the time of the emergence of Sikhism were the Bikrami and Hijri calendars. The Bikrami calendar was used predominantly by Hindus while the Hijri calendar was used by Muslims. Later, the Fasli calendar was introduced during the reign of Akbar in 1573 CE for revenue records, as it was better suited to the harvest seasons. Meanwhile, there is also the Saka calendar (which was officially adopted by the government of India). The arrival of the British introduced the Christian calendar, with its use amongst Sikhs increasing due to colonization. Due to a reform of the Gregorian calendar regarding leap-years, it no longer corresponded well with the Indic calendars, with the gap being eleven days by the time the British adopted the Gregorian calendar in September 1752. Therefore, the British decided that the next Wednesday, on 2 September 1752, would become a Thursday, 14 September 1752. Therefore, this change also impacted when comparing Indic and Gregorian dates with one another, with there being a difference in the length of the solar year (365 days, 5 hours, 49 minutes and 46 seconds [Gregorian] versus 365 days 6 hours 13 minutes and 30 seconds [Indic]). This leads to greater differences between the correspondence of dates between the Gregorian and Indic calendars over-time.

Historical Sikh chroniclers tended to use the lunar-Bikrami calendar to record dates, thus important dates recorded in Sikh history, such as the births, guruship term, and death of the Sikh gurus, were originally recorded as a lunar-Bikrami date. However, the solar-Bikrami calendar was also used by historical Sikhs, such as for marking the celebrations of Baisakhi, Lohri, and Maghi, and also to commemorate the anniversaries of the Battle of Chamkaur and Battle of Muktsar. The martyrdom dates of the sons of Guru Gobind Singh are also traced using the solar-Bikrami calendar. Furthermore, Sikhs traditionally celebrated the first day of every month as per the solar-Bikrami calendar as sangrand (Sanskrit: sankranti). The Islamic Hijri calendar was also historically used in-relation to Sikhs, especially by Muslim writers when recording events related to Sikhs but also by non-Muslim writers occasionally. The Sikhs historically used the Fasli calendar in documents such as revenue grants. The Haijri calendar is a completely lunar system, thus is based entirely on the phases of the Moon. There are two calendars which are exclusively Sikh in-origin: the Nanakshahi and Khalsa calendars. However, according to Louis E. Fenech, the usage of the Nanakshahi calendar was not common until the later 20th century.

Sikhs have traditionally recognised two eras and luni-solar calendars: the Nanakshahi and Khalsa. Traditionally, both these calendars closely followed the Bikrami calendar with the Nanakshahi year beginning on Kattak Pooranmashi (full moon) and the Khalsa year commencing with Vaisakhi. The methods for calculating the beginning of the Khalsa era were based on the Bikrami calendar. The year length was also the same as the Bikrami solar year. According to Steel (2000), (since the calendar was based on the Bikrami), the calendar has twelve lunar months that are determined by the lunar phase, but thirteen months in leap years which occur every 2–3 years in the Bikrami calendar to sync the lunar calendar with its solar counterpart. Kay (2011) abbreviates the Khalsa Era as KE.

References to the Nanakshahi Era have been made in historic documents. Banda Singh Bahadur adopted the Nanakshahi calendar in 1710 CE after his victory in Sirhind (12 May 1710 CE) according to which the year 1710 CE became Nanakshahi 241. However, Singh (2008) states the date of the victory as 14 May 1710 CE. According to Dilgeer (1997), Banda "continued adopting the months and the days of the months according to the Bikrami calendar". Banda Singh Bahadur also minted new coins also called Nanakshahi. Herrli (1993) states that "Banda is supposed to have dated his coins according to his new calendar. Although Banda may have proclaimed this era, it cannot be traced in contemporary documents and does not seem to have been actually used for dating". According to The Panjab Past and Present (1993), it is Gian Singh who "is the first to use Nanak Shahi Samvats along with those of Bikrami Samvats" in the Twarikh Guru Khalsa. According to Singha (1996), Gian Singh was a Punjabi author born in 1822. Gian Singh wrote the Twarikh Guru Khalsa in 1891. In around 1926, a blueprint for a Nanakshahi pocket-watch was designed by the Sri Guru Nanak Sahi Karkhana, Ludhiana, but likely never crafted.

The revised Nanakshahi calendar was designed by Pal Singh Purewal to replace the Bikrami calendar. The epoch of this calendar is the birth of the first Sikh Guru, Nanak Dev in 1469 and the Nanakshahi year commences on 1 Chet. New Year's Day falls annually on what is 14 March in the Gregorian Western calendar. The start of each month is fixed. According to Kapel (2006), the solar accuracy of the Nanakshahi calendar is linked to the Gregorian civil calendar. This is because the Nanaskhahi calendar uses the tropical year instead of using the sidereal year which is used in the Bikrami calendar or the old Nanakshahi and Khalsa calendars.

The amended Nanakshahi calendar was adopted in 1998 and released in 1999 by the Shiromani Gurdwara Prabhandak Committee (SGPC) to determine the dates for important Sikh events. Due to controversy surrounding the amended calendar, it was shortly retracted. The calendar was re-released in 2003 by the SGPC with three dates: Guru Nanak Dev Ji's Birth, Holla Mohalla, and Bandi Chhor Divas kept movable as per the old Bikrami system as a compromise. The calendar was implemented during the SGPC presidency of Sikh scholar Prof. Kirpal Singh Badungar at Takhat Sri Damdama Sahib in the presence of Sikh leadership. The Mool Nanakshahi Calendar recognizes the adoption event, of 1999 CE, in the Sikh history when SGPC released the first calendar with permanently fixed dates in the Tropical Calendar. Therefore, the calculations of this calendar do not regress back from 1999 CE into the Bikrami era, and accurately fixes for all time in the future.

The dates of Sikh celebrations are now calculated by the Nanakshahi calendar, however the observances of Guru Nanak Gurpurab, Vaisakhi, and Bandi Chhor Divas continue to be calculated according to the traditional Bikrami calendar.

== Structure and system ==
=== Nanakshahi and Khalsa ===
The Nanakshahi and Khalsa calendars are extremely similar to the traditional Bikrami calendar, with the key difference being the reference epoch. The reference epoch for the Nanakshahi calendar is the birth year of Guru Nanak (1469 CE) whilst the one for the Khalsa calendar is the officiailization of the Khalsa order (1699 CE). There is a difference between the start of the year between the Nanakshahi and Khalsa calendars, with the start-date for the Nanakshahi calendar being puranmashi (full-moon) of Kattak (which is likely an error, as most scholars agree that Guru Nanak was born actually in the month of Baisakh rather than Kattak), meanwhile the Khalsa year starts on the first day of the month of Baisakh. The Nanakshahi calendar is abbreviated as N.S., whilst the Khalsa calendar can be abbreviated as K.E. The Mool Nanakshahi calendar is abbreviated as M.N.S.C. or M.S.N.

=== Earlier calendars ===
==== Bikrami ====
The Bikrami calendar, also known as Malwa Sammat, which was historically used by Sikhs is luni-solar, where the year is determined by time taken for the Earth to complete one revolution whilst the month is determined by both solar and lunar divisions. The week is divided into seven days. The day is traditionally divided into jam or pahir (1/8th of a day), ghari (1/8th of a pahir), and pal (1/60th of a ghari). However, Western influence has meant the divisions of the day have been replaced with the hour-minute-second system. The solar-bikrami calendar begins on the first day of the month of Baisakh whilst the lunar-bikrami calendar begins on the day following no-moon (known as amāvas) of the month of Chet. The months of the calendar in-order are: Chet, Baisakh, Jeth, Har, Savan, Bhadon, Assu, Kattak, Maghar, Poh, Magh, and Phagun. Dates of the solar-calendar's months, known as parvishte, follow consecutively throughout the month. The lunar-months are divided into two halves, which are known as paksas, with the two halves being dark (krishan) and shukal (shukal). The beginning of a lunar-month is marked on the day following the puranmashi (full-moon). In-regards to dates, which are known as tithi or thit, the first half are given the prefix of vadi for 1–14 or 15, while dates of the remaining half are prefixed by the term sudi. Solar Bikrami years are 365 days-long, with the four year cycle consisting of three-years that are 365 days long and one year that is 366 days long. The Lunar Bikrami years are 254 days long due to the Moon's revolution around the Earth only being twenty-nine and a half days. To account for this difference in annual length, every three lunar-years, a lunar-month named laund or adhik (intercalary or embolismal) is repeated to keep both the solar and lunar Bikrami calendars aligned to one another. The dates of the solar calendar were divided into twelve zodiac signs. The Bikrami calendar is popularly seen as beginning during the reign of Raja Vikramaditya (known as Bikramajit in Punjabi) of Ujjain. Its reference epoch is 57 BCE. The calendar is abbreviated as Bk., V.S., or S. Whilst the calendar notation is commonly abbreviated as V.S. ("Vikram Samvat"), another alternative abbreviation is Bk. ("Bikrami") or simply as S. ("Sammat"). The Bk. abbreviation is often used by Punjabis.

==== Hijri ====
The Hijri calendar, sometimes used in-relation to Sikhs in historical literature, is a completely lunar-system. Therefore, months and years are based upon the Moon's revolution around the Earth. The reference epoch was Prophet Muhammad's hijrat (migration) from Mecca to Medina, in 622 CE. A full revolution of the Moon around the Earth is one month whilst twelve of them is one lunar year. Thus, the lunar-year ends up being eleven days shorter than a solar year since it takes the Moon twenty-nine and a half days on-average to complete one revolution around the Earth. The Hijri calendar begins on the first day of Muharram, with the following months being Safar, Rabi ul-Awwal, Rabi us-Sani, Jamadi ul-Awwal, Jamadi us-Sani, Rajab, Shaban, Ramzan, Shawwal, Ziqadah, and Zi ul-Hajj. Its abbreviation is A.H., which stands for anno hegirae. Meanwhile, Persian years are abbreviated as A.P., meaning anno persico.

==== Fasli ====
The Fasli calendar (derived from the word fasal, meaning "harvest"), introduced during the reign of Akbar, was also used during the development of Sikhism. The calendar consists of lunar-months which have Bikrami names but are not divided into dark and light fortnights. Furthermore, a mah i-kabisah (intercalary month) is added every third year to make the calendar correspond to the solar one. However, the reference epoch for the Fasli calendar is still the same as the Hijri one, therefore the year 1573 CE when the Fasli calendar was introduced corresponds to the date 1 Assu 980 Fasli, the same as the Hijri calendar (A.H. 980) and different from the Bikrami date of 1 Assu 1630 Bk. However, since the Hijri calendar is completely lunar whilst the Fasli calendar is not, the years quickly did not correspond between the two calendars, as lunar years are 11 days shorter than the Fasli year.

== Features of the Nanakshahi calendar (2003) ==
Features of the original Nanakshahi calendar (2003 Version):

- Uses the accurate Tropical year (365 Days, 5 Hours, 48 Minutes, 45 Seconds) rather than the Sidereal year
- Called Nanakshahi after Guru Nanak (Founder of Sikhism)
- Year 1 is the Year of Guru Nanak's Birth (1469 CE). As an example, 16 September 2026 CE is Nanakshahi 558.
- Is Based on Gurbani – Month Names are taken from Guru Granth Sahib
- Contains 5 Months of 31 days followed by 7 Months of 30 days
- Leap year every 4 Years in which the last month (Phagun) has an extra day
- Approved by Akal Takht in 2003

=== Months ===
The months in the 2003 version (also known as the Mool Nanakshahi Calendar) are:

No.	Name	Punjabi	Days	Gregorian Months	Season
1	Chet	ਚੇਤ	31	14 March – 13 April	Basant (Spring)
2	Vaisakh	ਵੈਸਾਖ	31	14 April – 14 May	Basant (Spring)
3	Jeth	ਜੇਠ	31	15 May – 14 June	Garikham (Summer)
4	Harh	ਹਾੜ	31	15 June – 15 July	Garisham (Summer)
5	Sawan	ਸਾਵਣ	31	16 July – 15 August	Rut Baras (Rainy season)
6	Bhadon	ਭਾਦੋਂ	30	16 August – 14 September	Rut Baras (Rainy season)
7	Assu	ਅੱਸੂ	30	15 September – 14 October	Sard (Autumn)
8	Kattak	ਕੱਤਕ	30	15 October – 13 November	Sard (Autumn)
9	Maghar	ਮੱਘਰ	30	14 November – 13 December	Sisiar (Winter)
10	Poh	ਪੋਹ	30	14 December – 12 January	Sisiar (Winter)
11	Magh	ਮਾਘ	30	13 January – 11 February	Himkar (late Winter/early Spring)
12	Phaggan	ਫੱਗਣ	30/31	12 February – 13 March	Himkar (late Winter/early Spring)

== Festivals and events (2003 version) ==
Dates of observance of festivals as determined by reference to the 2003 version.

Festivals and events (Original Nanakshahi calendar)	Nanakshahi date	Gregorian date
Guru Har Rai becomes the 7th Guru; Nanakshahi New Year Commences	1 Chet	14 Mar
Guru Hargobind merges back to the Creator	6 Chet	19 Mar
The ordination of the Khalsa; Birth of Guru Nanak (Vaisakhi Date)	1 Vaisakh	14 Apr
Guru Angad merges back to the Creator; Guru Amar Das becomes the 3rd Guru; Guru Harkrishan merges back to the Creator; Guru Tegh Bahadur becomes the 9th Guru	3 Vaisakh	16 Apr
Birth of Guru Angad, the 2nd Guru; Birth of Guru Tegh Bahadur, the 9th Guru	5 Vaisakh	18 Apr
Birth of Guru Arjan, the 5th Guru	19 Vaisakh	2 May
Birth of Guru Amar Das, the 3rd Guru	9 Jeth	23 May
Guru Hargobind becomes the 6th Guru	28 Jeth	11 Jun
Guru Arjan, the 5th Guru, is martyred	2 Harh	16 Jun
Foundation Day of the Akaal Takht	18 Harh	16 Jun
Birth of Guru Hargobind, the 6th Guru	21 Harh	5 Jul
Miri-Piri is established by Guru Hargobind	6 Sawan	21 Jul
Birth of Guru Harkrishan, the 8th Guru	8 Sawan	23 Jul
The writing of the Guru Granth Sahib, the Sikh Scripture, is completed at Damdama Sahib	15 Bhadon	30 Aug
Guru Granth Sahib, the Sikh Scripture, is installed at the Golden Temple for the first time	17 Bhadon	1 Sep
Guru Amar Das merges back to the Creator; Guru Ram Das becomes the 4th Guru; Guru Ram Das merges back to the Creator; Guru Arjan becomes the 5th Guru	2 Assu	16 Sep
Guru Angad becomes the 2nd Guru	4 Assu	18 Sep
Guru Nanak merges back to the Creator	8 Assu	22 Sep
Birth of Guru Ram Das, the 4th Guru	25 Assu	9 Oct
Guru Har Rai merges back to the Creator; Guru Harkrishan becomes the 8th Guru; The Guru Granth Sahib is declared as the Guru for all times to come by Guru Gobind Singh, the 10th and the last human Guru	6 Katak	20 Oct
Guru Gobind Singh merges back to the Creator	7 Katak	21 Oct
Guru Gobind Singh becomes the 10th Guru	11 Maghar	24 Nov
Guru Tegh Bahadur martyred in Delhi by Aurangzeb for defending the oppressed	11 Maghar	24 Nov
Ajit Singh, and Jujhar Singh, the two elder sons of Guru Gobind Singh, martyred in the battle of Chamkaur	8 Poh	21 Dec
Zorawar Singh, and Fateh Singh, the two younger sons of Guru Gobind Singh, executed in Sirhind	13 Poh	26 Dec
Birth of Guru Gobind Singh, the 10th Guru	23 Poh	5 Jan
Birth of Guru Har Rai, the 7th Guru	19 Magh	31 Jan

Movable dates for Sikh Festivals in the 2003 and 2010 versions. (These change every year in line with the lunar phase.)

Year	Hola Mohalla	Bandi Chhor Divas	Birth of Guru Nanak Dev
2003	19 Mar	25 Oct	8 Nov
2004	7 Mar	12 Nov	26 Nov
2005	26 Mar	1 Nov	15 Nov
2006	15 Mar	21 Oct	5 Nov
2007	4 Mar	9 Nov	24 Nov
2008	22 Mar	28 Oct	13 Nov
2009	11 Mar	17 Oct	2 Nov
2010	1 Mar	5 Nov	21 Nov
2011	20 Mar	26 Oct	10 Nov
2012	9 Mar	13 Nov	28 Nov
2013	28 Mar	3 Nov	17 Nov
2014	17 Mar	23 Oct	6 Nov
2015	6 Mar	11 Nov	25 Nov
2016	24 Mar	30 Oct	14 Nov
2017	13 Mar	19 Oct	4 Nov
2018	2 Mar	7 Nov	23 Nov
2019	21 Mar	27 Oct	12 Nov
2020	10 Mar	14 Nov	30 Nov

== Controversy ==
In 2010, the SGPC modified the calendar so that the dates for the start of the months are movable so that they coincide with the Bikrami calendar and changed the dates for various Sikh festivals so they are based upon the lunar phase. This has created controversy with some bodies adopting the original 2003 version, also called the "Mool Nanakshahi Calendar" and others, the 2010 version. By 2014, the SGPC had scrapped the Nanakshahi calendar from 2003 and reverted to the Bikrami calendar entirely, however it was still published under the name of Nanakshahi. The Sikh bodies termed it a step taken under pressure from the RSS and Shiromani Akali Dal. There is also some controversy about the acceptance of the calendar altogether among certain sectors of the Sikh world.

According to Ahaluwalia (2003), the Nanakshahi calendar goes against the use of lunar Bikrami dates by the Gurus themselves and is contradictory. It begins with the year of birth of Guru Nanak Dev, but the first date, 1 Chet, is when Guru Har Rai was installed the seventh Guru. However, the first date of the Nanakshahi calendar (1 Chet) is based upon the Barah Maha of the Guru Granth Sahib, which has Chet as the first month. Pal Singh Purewal, as reported in the Edmonton Journal (March 2018) has stated that his aims in formulating the Nanakshahi calendar were, "first and foremost, it should respect sacred holy scriptures. Second, it should discard the lunar calendar and use only a solar one. Third, all the dates should be fixed and not vary from year to year." In reality however, state Haar and Kalsi (2009), the introduction of the Nanakshahi calendar has resulted in many festivals being "celebrated on two dates depending on the choice of the management of the local gurdwaras."

In 2017, a conference was held in Chicago where it was decided to fix the three movable dates from the 2003 version and fully follow the original version published in 1999.

In 2018, the Akal Takhat Jathedar at the time, Giani Gurbachan Singh asked that the Sikhs should unite and adopt the new Nanakshahi Calendar and that the "majority of Sikh sects, including Nihangs, Nirmalays, Udhasis and Damdami Taksal, observe and want to observe Sikh religious days according to the (amended) Nanakshahi calendar." SGPC president, Gobind Singh Longowal, on 13 March 2018 urged all Sikhs to follow the current (2014) Nanakshahi calendar. The previous SGPC President before Longowal, Prof. Kirpal Singh Badungar, tried to appeal the Akal Takht to celebrate the birthday of Guru Gobind Singh on 23 Poh (5 January) as per the original Nanakshahi calendar, but the appeal was denied.

The PSGPC and a majority of the other gurdwara managements across the world are opposing the modified version of the calendar citing that the SGPC reverted to the Bikrami calendar. They argue that in the Bikrami calendar, dates of many gurpurbs coincide, thereby creating confusion among the Sikh Panth.

Sikh historian Harjinder Singh Dilgeer has rejected this calendar fully.

== Mool Nanakshahi Calendar ==
The "Mool" prefix, means "original". SGPC released a calendar that was close to this one on the 300th year of Khalsa's Creation in 1999. In 2003, Pal Singh Purewal, who had been working towards the Sikh calendar since the 1960s, introduced the Nanakshahi Calendar. The Shiromani Gurdwara Prabandhak Committee had implemented and launched the copies of the Mool Nanakshahi Calendar on 14 April 2003 from the land of Takhat Sri Damdama Sahib under the presidency of prominent Sikh scholar Prof Kirpal Singh Badungar and Akal Takhat Jathedar Giani Joginder Singh Vedanti (chairman of the committee for Mool Nanakshahi Calendar) on the occasion of Baisakhi in the presence of large community gathering (unlike Bikrami calendar which is based on lunar setup the Mool Nanakshahi Calendar was largely based on solar system). As per the SGPC records 21 meetings were held having deep deliberations before the implementation of this Calendar. Sikhs throughout the world have embraced the Mool Nanakshahi Calendar with full reverence as the Sikh scholars with empirical research have held that the Calendar had its roots to the First Khalsa Raj established by Baba Banda Singh Bahadur who first released and implemented it.

A Calendar Reform Committee composed of many scholars and representatives of various academic institutions met at the Institute of Sikh Studies in Chandigarh in 1995. In 1996, a formal proposal was submitted to the Shiromani Gurdwara Prabandhak Committee (SGPC). The SGPC issued a General House Resolution asking the Sikhs across the world to adopt the Sikh Calendar. In 2003, although some of the dates were largely adopted as fixed dates, some due to cultural and political concerns were dismissed and reverted to Bikrami dates, which were later synchronized in 2017 when the Mool Nanakshahi Calendar was introduced to fix all dates.

Pal Singh Purewal, introduced the term Mool (original) Nanakshahi Calendar in 2017. The new term meant to distinguish from the current Nanakshahi Calendar which was altered in 2003 to include movable Bikrami dates in addition to the new adopted dates by the SGPC in 1999. This pre-altered versional of the calendar was the one proposed by the Calendar Reform Committee in 1995 and accepted by the SGPC in 1999. The original calendar synchronized Mool Nanakshahi (religious) Calendar with Common Era (CE) Calendar, permanently and hence termed Mool Nanakshahi Calendar.

There are notable differences between the Nanakshahi Calendar and the Mool Nanakshahi Calendar. Understanding the motivation and decades of research to reflect the accuracy of historical events is essential. The Mool Nanakshahi Calendar continues to gather support across the world as Sikhs yearn to follow fixed dates which are an accurate historical representation of the Sikh History and an attempt at adding integrity to the Sikh identity. This provides the platform for Sikhs to agree on a common calendar. Sardar Pal Singh Purewal, the main architect of the calendar, has written scholarly articles on this issue and explains the difference between the Mool Nanakshahi Calendar and Bikrami Calendars. There is a difference between the Nanakshai Calendar and the Mool Nanakshahi Calendar as such as the Mool Nanakshahi Calendar fixes dates which were movable in the Nanakshahi Calendar.

The Sikh Youth of Punjab (SYP) embraces this version of the calendar.

=== In the news ===
The extensive 2 day Mool Nanakshahi Calendar Implementation Conference in Chicago detailed the significance of the changes. Several scholars and topics on this topic lead the presentations and discussions.

- Mool Nanakshahi Calendar gains momentum across the world.
- March 2020, Pakistan Sikh Gurdwara Prabadhak Committee released the Mool Nanakshahi Calendar.

=== Significant resolutions ===
Significant resolutions were adopted at the Chicago conference in December 2017. More importantly three dates were fixed for the upcoming years so that the Nanak's Gurpurab, Bandee Chorrd Divas, and Holla-Muhalla fall on the same date each year. The fixed dates, in addition to the already constant Vaisakhi 14 April date, are:

- Bandee Chorrd Divas – 12 February every year
- Holla-Muhalla – 14 March every year
- Guru Nanak's Gurpurab – 14 April every year
- Vaisakhi – 14 April every year

== Months (2014 version) ==
The start date of the months in the modified Nanakshahi calendar are not fixed and hence do not correspond to the seasons.

No.	Name	Punjabi	Gregorian Months
1	Chet	ਚੇਤ	March – April
2	Vaisakh	ਵੈਸਾਖ	April – May
3	Jeth	ਜੇਠ	May – June
4	Harh	ਹਾੜ	June – July
5	Sawan	ਸਾਵਣ	July – August
6	Bhadon	ਭਾਦੋਂ	August – September
7	Assu	ਅੱਸੂ	September – October
8	Kattak	ਕੱਤਕ	October – November
9	Maghar	ਮੱਘਰ	November – December
10	Poh	ਪੋਹ	December – January
11	Magh	ਮਾਘ	January – February
12	Phaggan	ਫੱਗਣ	February – March

== See also ==
- Punjabi calendar
- Indian national calendar
- Hindu calendar
- Bengali calendar
