= Shaheedi Diwas of Guru Arjan =

Sikh observation

The Shaheedi Diwas of Guru Arjan commemorates the day of martyrdom of the fifth Sikh guru, Guru Arjan, who was executed by the Mughals in 1606. It is a regional gazetted holiday in Punjab and Haryana. The observation is held on the 24th day of Jeth, falling in either May or June in the Gregorian calendar.
