= Guru Nanak Gurpurab =

Sikh festival

Nanak Gurpurab ਗੁਰੂ ਨਾਨਕ ਗੁਰਪੁਰਬ
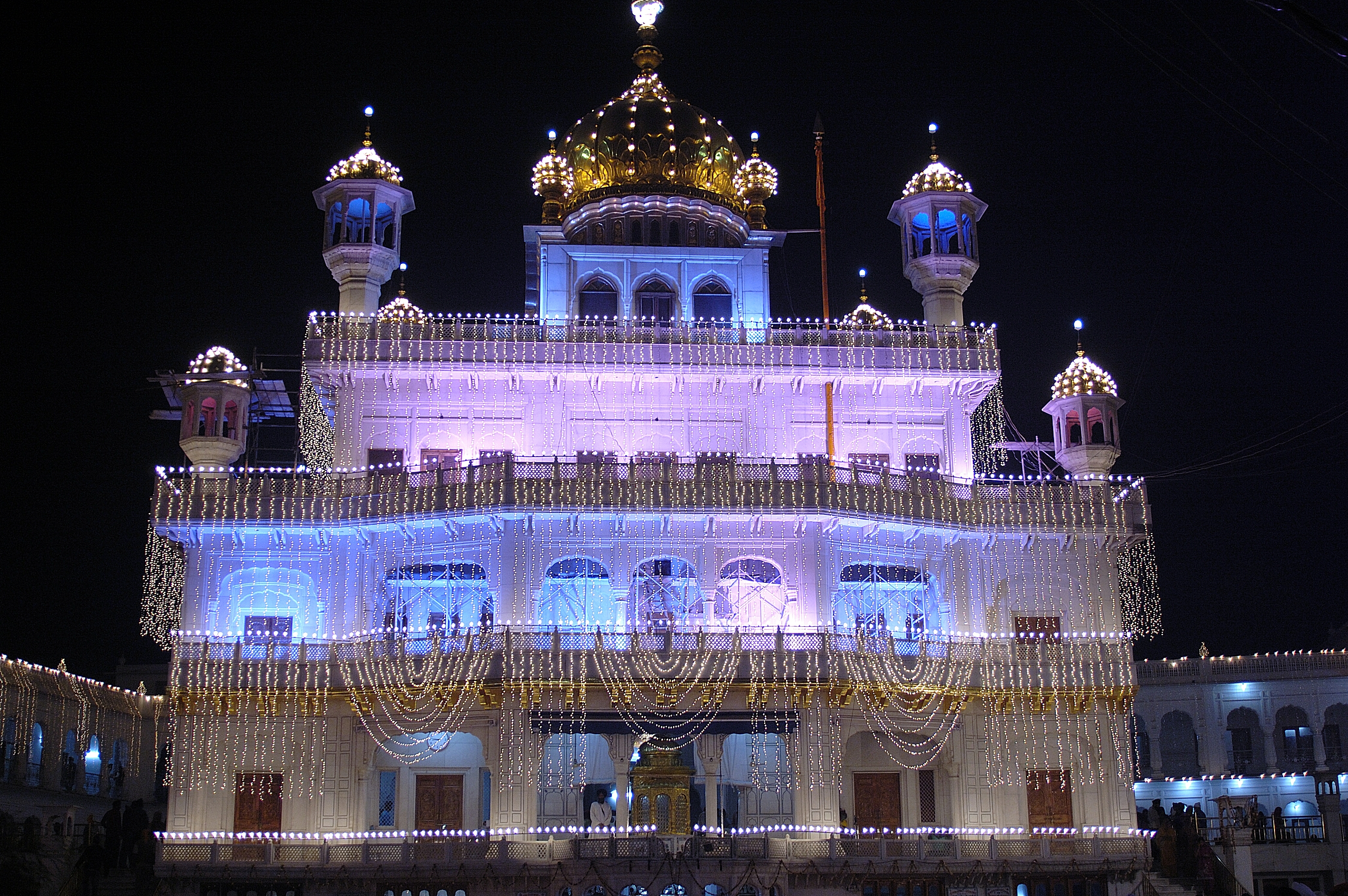
- Akal Takht illuminated on Guru Nanak's Birthday, in Harmandir Sahib complex, Amritsar.
- Official name: Guru Nanak Gurpurab Bal
- Also called: Parkash Purab Guru Nanak
- Observed by: Sikhs, Nanakpanthi and many non-Sikhs
- Type: Religious, cultural, international
- Significance: Commemoration of the nativity of Nanak
- Celebrations: gift-giving, gurdwara services
- Observances: Festival
- Date: Katak Puranmashi 1469
- 2025 date: 5 November
- 2026 date: 24 November
- Started by: Nanak

Guru Nanak Gurpurab (Punjabi: ਗੁਰੂ ਨਾਨਕ ਗੁਰਪੁਰਬ (Gurmukhi)), also known as Guru Nanak Prakash Utsav (ਗੁਰੂ ਨਾਨਕ ਪ੍ਰਕਾਸ਼ ਉਤਸਵ) and Guru Nanak Jayanti (ਗੁਰੂ ਨਾਨਕ ਜਯੰਤੀ), celebrates the birth of the first Sikh guru, Guru Nanak. One of the most celebrated and important Sikh gurus and the founder of Sikhism, Guru Nanak is highly revered by the Sikh community. This is one of the most sacred festivals in Sikhism, or Sikhi. The festivities in the Sikh religion revolve around the anniversaries of the 10 Sikh Gurus. These Gurus were responsible for shaping the beliefs of the Sikhs. Their birthdays, known as Gurpurab, are occasions for celebration and prayer among the Sikhs.

It is one of three Sikh celebrations still calculated using the traditional Bikrami calendar, alongside Vaisakhi and Bandi Chhor Divas, where as the rest are determined now as per the Nanakshahi calendar.

== Background ==
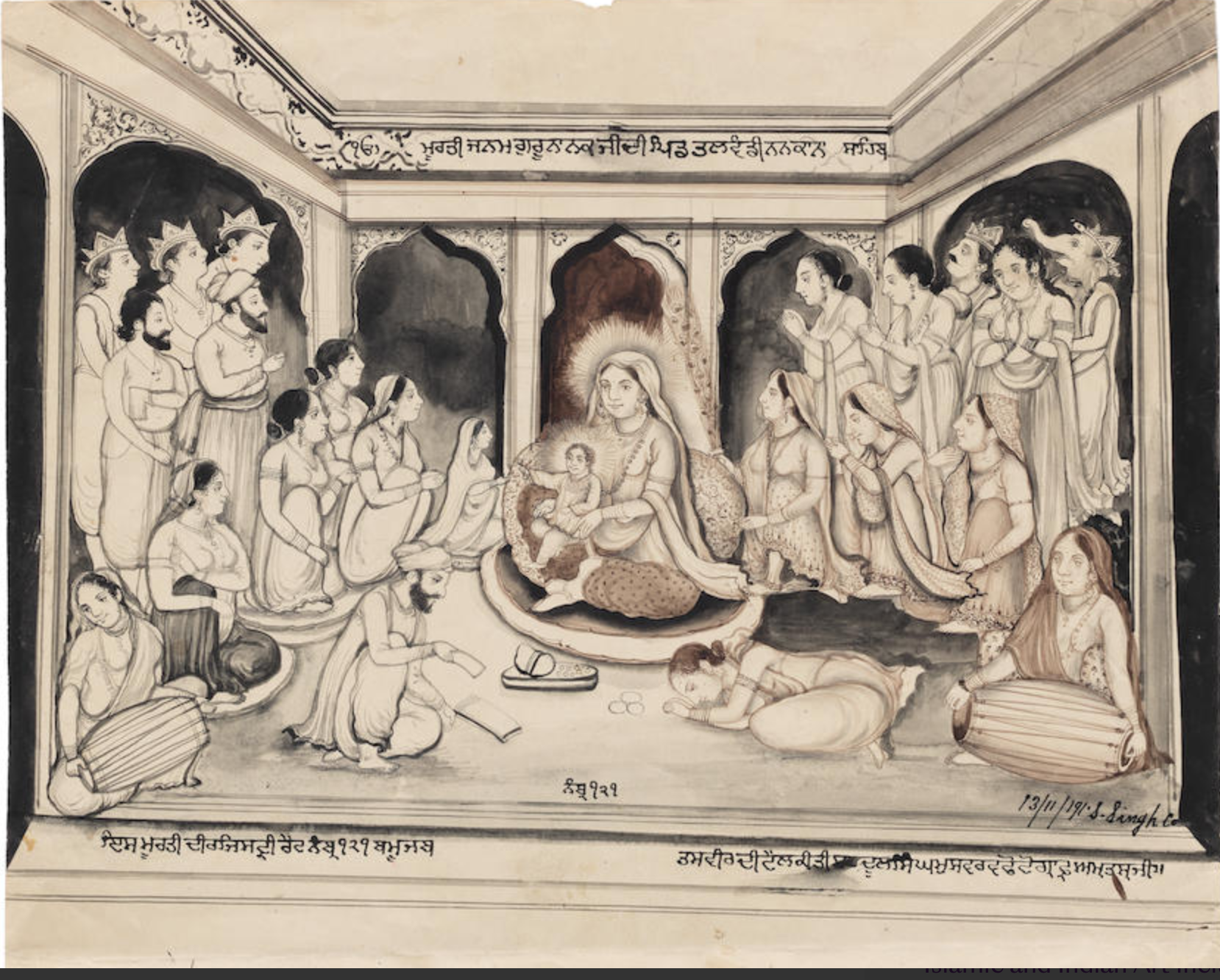
The Birth of Guru Nanak, by the artist Sardul Singh in 1910.

Guru Nanak, the founder of Sikhism, was born on Puranmashi of Kattak in 1469, according to the Vikram Samvat calendar in Rai-Bhoi-di Talwandi in the present Shekhupura District of Pakistan, now Nankana Sahib. It is a Gazetted holiday in India. The controversial Bhai Bala Janamsakhi claims Guru Nanak was born on the Full Moon (Pooranmashi) of the Indian Lunar Month Kartik. The Sikhs have been celebrating Guru Nanak's Gurpurab around November for this reason, and it has been ingrained in Sikh Traditions.

However, some scholars and organizations believe the Birthday should be celebrated on Vaisakhi, which falls on 27 November according to the Mool Nanakshahi Calendar. Other people and organizations would like to keep the traditional date by celebrating on the Full moon day, called Pooranmashi or Purnima, of the Lunar Month Kartik. The Nanakshahi Calendar follows the Gregorian calendar and celebrates it on Kartik Purnima.

The different dates reflect a mismatch between different time units. The problem with designing an accurate calendar is that the three natural units of time – the day, the month and the year – are based on different movements – the Earth's rotation about its axis, the Moon's revolution around the Earth and the Earth's revolution around the Sun. Their periods are not integer multiples of each other. The challenge in aligning solar and lunar calendars arises from the discrepancy in their respective durations. A solar year spans approximately 365.25 days, while a lunar month is around 29.53 days. The sum of twelve lunar months falls short of a solar year by 11 days, 1 hour, 31 minutes, and 12 seconds. Over three years, this discrepancy nearly equals one month. The Moon's orbit takes about 27.3 days, causing it to lag behind the Earth's orbit around the sun, resulting in a 10.87-day difference between a lunar year (354.372 days) and a solar year (365.2422 days).

== Significance ==
Guru Nanak preached that any person could connect to God by worshipping with a clear conscience. His teachings are included in Guru Granth Sahib.

== The festival ==
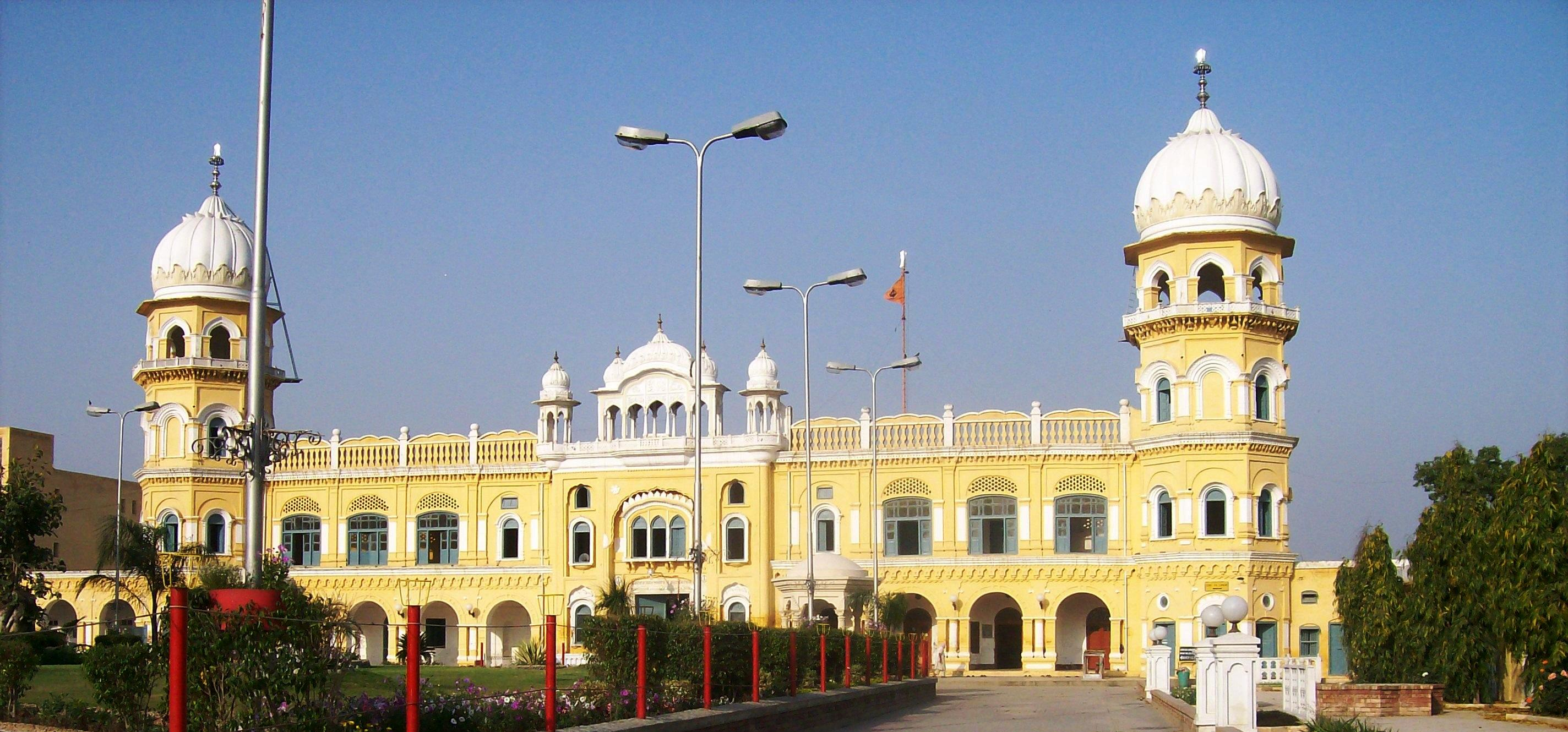
Gurdwara Nankana Sahib, Pakistan, the birthplace of Guru Nanak

The celebration is generally similar for all Sikhs; only the hymns are different. The celebrations usually commence with Prabhat Pheris. Prabhat Pheris are early morning processions that begin at the Gurudwaras and proceed around the localities singing hymns. Generally, two days before the birthday, Akhand Path (a forty-eight-hour non-stop reading of the Guru Granth Sahib, the holy book of the Sikhs) is held in the Gurdwaras.

The day prior to the birthday, a procession, referred to as Nagarkirtan, is organised. This procession is led by the Panj Pyaras (Five Beloved Ones). They head the procession carrying the Sikh flag, known as the Nishan Sahib and the Palki (Palanquin) of Guru Granth Sahib. They are followed by teams of singers singing hymns and devotees sing the chorus. There are brass bands playing different tunes and 'Gatka' teams display their swordsmanship through various martial arts and as mock battles using traditional weapons. The procession pours into the streets of the town. The passage is covered with banners and gates are decorated flags and flowers, for this special occasion. The leaders spreading the message of Guru Nanak.

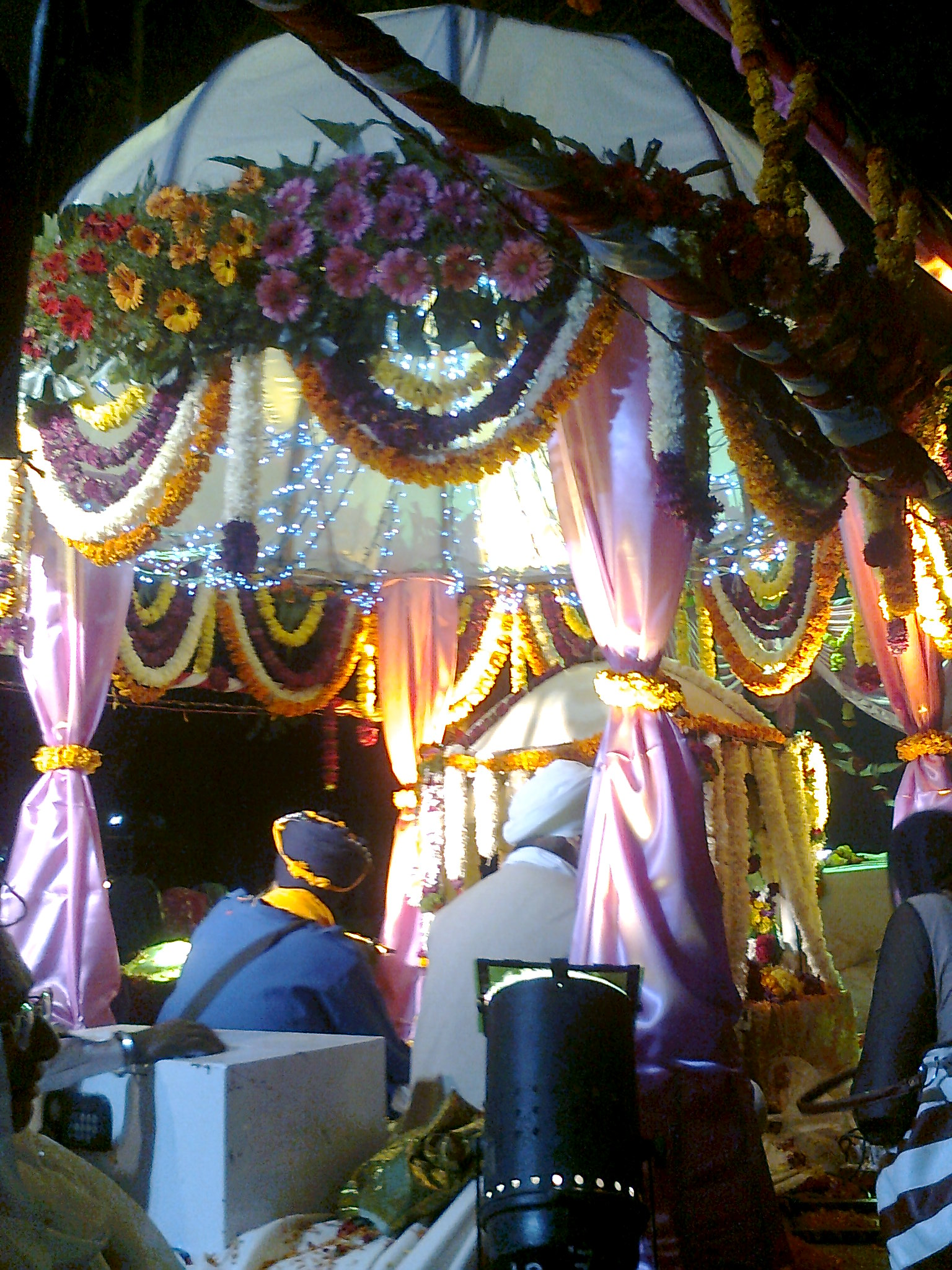
Guru Nanak Gurpurab 2010 at Pune, Maharashtra, India

On the day of the Gurpurab, the celebrations commence/begin early in the morning at about 4 to 5 a.m. This time of the day is referred to as Amrit Vela. The day begins with the singing of Asaa-Ki-Vaar (morning hymns). This is followed by any combination of Katha (exposition of the scripture) and Kirtan (hymns from the Sikh scriptures), in the praise of the Guru. Following that is the Langar, a special community lunch, which is arranged at the Gurudwaras by volunteers. The idea behind the free communal lunch is that everyone, irrespective of gender, caste, class or creed, should be offered food in the spirit of seva (service) and bhakti (devotion).

Night prayer sessions are also held in some Gurudwaras, which begin around sunset when Rehras (evening prayer) is recited, followed by Kirtan till late at night. The congregation starts singing Gurbani at about 1:20 a.m., which is the actual time of birth of Guru Nanak. The celebrations culminate at around 2 a.m. Guru Nanak Gurpurab is celebrated by the Sikh community all over the world and is one of the most important festivals in the Sikh calendar. The celebrations are especially colorful in Punjab, Haryana, and Chandigarh and many more locations like in parts of Pakistan and England. Even some Sindhis celebrate this festival. Celebrating the auspicious day, the Punjab government has announced that it will install chairs dedicated to the great saint in 11 universities. The announcement was made on 11 November 2019.

=== Public Holiday ===
Guru Nanak Gurpurab is celebrated as public holiday in the following places:

Country	States/Provinces
India	Punjab, Haryana, Rajasthan, Delhi, Jammu and Kashmir, Uttar Pradesh, Madhya Pradesh, Gujarat, Maharashtra, Jharkhand, Odisha, West Bengal, Chhattisgarh, Chandigarh, Himachal Pradesh, Uttarakhand, Assam

== See also ==
- Gurpurb – Sikh celebration of a Guru's birthday
- Guru Gaddi – Sikh term meaning "seat of the guru"
- Joti Jot – Sikh term referring to the physical death of a person
