= Vaisakh =

Second month of the Punjabi calendar

Vaisakh (Shahmukhi: وساکھ; Gurmukhi: ਵਿਸਾਖ, Punjabi pronunciation: [ʋɪsaːkʰᵊ]) is the first month in the Punjabi calendar and the second month of the Nanakshahi calendar. The Nanakshahi solar month begins on 14 April, after Chet, and ends on 5 May, with 1 Jeth following. The traditional Punjabi Bikrami lunisolar month begins on the day after the Chet full moon and ends on the Vaisakh full moon.

This month coincides with April and May in the Gregorian calendar, Boishakh in the Bengali calendar, and Vaisakha in the Hindu calendar and the Indian national calendar; it comprises the time of crop-harvesting in the Punjab region.

Vaisakhi is the most important festival in the Sikh calendar, taking place on the first day of Vaisakh, which falls on 14 April each year. On this day, the Khalsa was created and much celebration takes place in the form of Samagams, Nagar Kirtan, Gatka exhibitions, Akand Paths and so on. Chet is the first month of the Nanakshahi calendar, however the Punjabi peasantry celebrate their new year on 1 Vaisakh (14 April) as it is when their harvest is due. The Nanakshahi solar calendar used by Sikhs observes 14 April as 1 Vaisakh, while the traditional Punjabi lunisolar calendar used primarily by Hindus and farmers observes all months based on the lunar cycle, thus the first day of Vaisakh is the day after the Chet full moon in the lunar calendar. In the traditional Punjabi lunisolar calendar, the festival of Vaisakhi may fall in either Chet or Vaisakh.

== Important events during this month ==
=== April ===
- 14 April (1 Vaisakh) - Vaisakhi (see above)
- 16 April (3 Vaisakh) - Joti Jot of Guru Angad Dev Ji
- 16 April (3 Vaisakh) - Gur Gadi of Guru Amar Das Ji
- 16 April (3 Vaisakh) - Joti Jot Guru Har Krishan Ji
- 16 April (3 Vaisakh) - Gur Gadi of Guru Tegh Bahadur Ji
- 18 April (5 Vaisakh) - Birth of Guru Angad Dev Ji
- 18 April (5 Vaisakh) - Birth of Guru Tegh Bahadur Ji

=== May ===
- 2 May (19 Vaisakh) - Birth of Guru Arjan Dev Ji
- 15 May (1 Jeth) - The end of the month Vaisakh and the start of Jeth

=== Hindu Festivals Based on Lunar Dates ===
- 3 Vaisakh (lunar reckoning): Akha Teej (ਅੱਖਾ ਤੀਜ) - A festival considered auspicious to start any new beginnings, new ventures, charity, and large purchases especially purchases of gold. Any good deeds or investments made on this day are believed to be everlasting. Lord Vishnu and Goddess Lakshmi are worshipped on this day.

=== Hindu Festivals Based on Solar Dates ===
The following festival may fall in the month of Chet or Vaisakh:

- April 13/14: Vaisakhi (ਵਿਸਾਖੀ) - A festival marking the sun's transit into Mesha (Aries), the approaching summer, and the beginning of the Hindu solar year. It is observed as a day of thanksgiving to celebrate the harvest of the Rabi crops. Devotees take purifying dips into local waterbodies, rivers, and sarovars while offering prayers to Surya and donate fruits, water pitchers, and other summer items to the poor for the approaching summer heat. Vaisakhi is also a very important holy day for Sikhs as it commemorates the day when Guru Gobind Singh established the Khalsa Panth. The Sikh celebrations usually involve nagar kirtans. In other regions of South Asia, this festival has various names, including Mesha Sankranti, Puthandu, Vishu, Bisu Parba, Buisu, Bohag Bihu, Maha Bishuba Sankranti, Pohela Boishakh, Jur Sital, Bizhu, and Sangken.

== Sources ==
- p. 133 of the Sri Guru Granth Sahib on Sri Granth

== See also ==
- Vaisakha (Hindu and Indian calendars)
