= Tripuri calendar =

Traditional luni-solar calendar used by the Tripuri people

The Tripuri calendar is the traditional solar calendar used by the Tripuri people, especially in the context of Tripuri irredentism. Its era, the "Twipra Era", "Tripura Era" or Tripurabda is set at 15 April AD 590.

The Tripura Era's New Year is on the 1st of Vaishak which corresponds to 14 or 15 of April of Common Era, depending on whether that year is a leap year or not. The months are named in pan Indian months, time since its inception 1419 years back by Tripur king Hamtorfa alias Himtifa alias Jujharufa in 512 Saka Era.

Historically, the Tripura Era was prevalent in all official matters of the princely state of Tippera under the British Raj. Tradition holds that the era marks the conquest of Bengal by the 118th Tripuri king in the Rajmala chronicle, Hamtor Fa (also Jujaru Fa or Himti or Birraj). In historical reality, however, the Tripuri era, just as the Bengali era, is an adoption of the Mughal Fasli era introduced by emperor Akbar in 1563. Its use in Tripura (Twipra) can be traced to the 163rd king in Tripuri reckoning, Govinda Manikya (fl. 1660), and the characteristic shift by three years is first recorded under his successor, Chhatramanikya in 1663/4, who can thus be considered to have introduced the "Tripuri calendar".

With the accession of Tripura to the Republic of India in 1949, official use of the Tripuri calendar was discontinued. There have long been calls to revive the Tripuri calendar in Tripuri nationalism. In 1991, the Tripuri era was first cited in the State Government calendar and diaries. In 2001, the Tripura Tribal Areas Autonomous District Council (TTAADC) authorities organized a three-day "Tring festival", which concluded at the TTAADC headquarters Khumulwng in West Tripura.

== See also ==
- Buisu
- Tripuri people
- Twipra kingdom
