= Chet (month) =

First month of the Punjabi calendar

Chet (Shahmukhi: چیت; Gurmukhi: ਚੇਤ, Punjabi pronunciation: [t͡ʃeːt̪ᵊ]) is the last month of the Punjabi calendar and the first month of the Nanakshahi calendar, which is used within Sikhism. The Nanakshahi solar month begins on March 14th and ends on April 14th, being followed by Vaisakh. It is the first month of the Nanakshahi calendar, however the Punjabi peasantry celebrate their new year on Vaisakh 1 on April 14th as it is when their harvest is due. The traditional Punjabi Bikrami lunisolar month begins on the day after the Phaggan full moon and ends on the Chet full moon.

This month coincides with Chaitra in the Hindu calendar and the Indian national calendar, and March and April in the Gregorian and Julian calendars and is 31 days long.

== Important events during this month ==
=== March ===
- 14 March (1 Chet) – Nanakshahi New Year
- 14 March (1 Chet) – Gur Gadi of Guru Har Rai
- 19 March (6 Chet) – Joti Jot of Guru Hargobind
- Hola Mohalla

=== April ===
- 9 April (27 Chet) – Birthday of Sahibzada Jujhar Singh Ji
- 14 April (1 Vaisakh) – The end of the month Chet and the start of Vaisakh

=== Hindu Festivals Based on Lunar Dates ===
- First Monday or Friday of Chet: Basadiya (ਬਸਾਡੀਆ) - A festival observed on the first Monday or Friday of Chet after Holi which is dedicated to Goddess Shitala. No fire or stove is lit at home and no cooking is done on this day for protection against disease. Only cold and stale food cooked on the day before is eaten on this day. Sweets such as gulgule are offered at shrines of Shitala which range from large temples to small village mounds.
- Chet 14: Chet Chaudas - A festival observed before the lunar new year when Punjabi Hindus would bathe in temple tanks or sacred waterbodies such as the Satluj, Beas, Ravi, Jhelum, Chenab, and Sindhu rivers.
- Chet 16-24: Chet Naurate/Basant Naurate (ਚੇਤ ਨੌਰਤੇ/ਬਸੰਤ ਨੌਰਤੇ) - A nine day period dedicated to Goddess Durga and her nine forms which marks the beginning of the Hindu lunar year. The Naurate of Assu is more significant.
- Chet 24: Ram Naumi (ਰਾਮ ਨੌਮੀ) - The last day of Chet Naurate which commemorates the culmination of the spring Devi worship period and the birth of Rama, the seventh avatar of Lord Vishnu.

=== Hindu Festivals Based on Solar Dates ===
The following festival may fall in the month of Chet or Vaisakh:

- April 13/14: Vaisakhi (ਵੈਸਾਖੀ) - A festival marking the sun's transit into Mesha (Aries), the approaching summer, and the beginning of the Hindu solar year. It is observed as a day of thanksgiving to celebrate the harvest of the Rabi crops. Devotees take purifying dips into local waterbodies, rivers, and sarovars while offering prayers to Surya and donate fruits, water pitchers, and other summer items to the poor for the approaching summer heat. Vaisakhi is also a very important holy day for Sikhs as it commemorates the day when Guru Gobind Singh Ji established the Khalsa Panth. The Sikh celebrations usually involve nagar kirtans. This festival is known as Mesha Sankranti, Puthandu, Vishu, Bisu Parba, Buisu, Bohag Bihu, Maha Bishuba Sankranti, Pohela Boishakh, Jur Sital, Bizhu, and Sangken in other regions of South Asia.

== See also ==
- Chaitra
