= Pal Singh Purewal =

Canadian engineer (1931/32–2022)

Pal Singh Purewal (1931/1932 – 22 September 2022) was a Punjabi engineer, author, scholar and a teacher. He was commonly known as the architect of the Mool Nanakshahi Calendar. He was also known as a role model in the Sikh community. He immigrated to the United Kingdom in 1965 and worked as a senior engineer at Texas Instruments. He moved to Canada in 1974. He has authored various research papers establishing the authenticity of the Sikh calendar since 1960s.

== Calendar ==
In his coordinated effort with the Institute of Sikh Studies and after making efforts for several years with other prominent scholars, a proposal to implement and adopt a Sikh calendar, called Nanaksahi Calendar was introduced and was accepted by the Shiromani Gurdwara Prabandhak Committee in 1996. Subsequently, at the 300th anniversary of the Khalsa panth, it was released by the SGPC after passing a general house resolution in 1999 and accepted by the Akal Takht (in part) in 2003. This created controversy in the Sikh community. He introduced implementation of the Mool (original) Nanakshahi Calendar in 2017, which refers to the pre-altered version of the calendar introduced and first accepted in 1999 which permanently synchronized Mool Nanakshahi (religious) Calendar with Common Era (CE) Calendar.

== Bibliography ==
His published texts include:

- Jantri 500 YEARS - An Almanac, published by Punjab School Education Board in November 1994
- Hijri Calendar - A book for which he received "lifetime achievement" award
