= Phaggan =

Twelfth month of the Punjabi calendar

Phaggaṇ (Shahmukhi: پھگݨ; Gurmukhi: ਫੱਗਣ, Punjabi pronunciation: [pʰəgːəɳᵊ]) is the twelfth and last month of the Punjabi calendar as well as the Nanakshahi calendar, which governs activities within Sikhism. The Nanakshahi solar month begins on February 12th, after Magh, and ends on March 14th, which marks the start of a new-year and beginning of Chet. The traditional Punjabi Bikrami lunisolar month begins on the day after the Magh full moon and ends on the Phaggan full moon.

This month coincides with Phalguna in the Hindu calendar and the Indian National calendar, and February and March of the Gregorian and Julian calendars and is 30 or 31 days long.

== Notable dates ==
- Phaggan 14: Maha Shivratri (ਸ਼ਿਵਰਾਤਰੀ)
- Phaggan 29: Choti Holi (ਛੋਟੀ\ ਹੋਲੀ)
- Phaggan 30: Holi

== See also ==
- Punjabi calendar
