= Poh =

Tenth month in the Punjabi calendar

Poh (Shahmukhi: پوہ; Gurmukhi: ਪੋਹ, Punjabi pronunciation: [póː]) is the tenth month of the Punjabi calendar as well as the Nanakshahi calendar, which governs the activities within Sikhism. The Nanakshahi solar month begins on December 14th, after Magghar, and ends on January 13th, being followed by Magh. The traditional Punjabi Bikrami lunisolar month begins on the day after the Magghar full moon and ends on the Poh full moon.

This month coincides with Pausha in the Hindu calendar and the Indian national calendar, and December and January in the Gregorian and Julian calendars and is 30 days long.

== Important events during this month ==
=== December ===
- December 23 (Poh 10) - Shaheedi divas of Sahibzada Baba Ajit Singh and Sahibzada Baba Jujhar Singh, the two elder sons of Guru Gobind Singh Ji
- December 26 (Poh 13) - Shaheedi divas of Sahibzada Zorawar Singh and Sahibzada Fateh Singh, the two younger sons of Guru Gobind Singh Ji

=== January ===
- January 5 (Poh 23) - Birth of Guru Gobind Singh Ji

=== Hindu Festivals Based on Solar Dates ===
The following festivals may fall in the month of Poh or Magh:

- January 13: Lohri (ਲੋਹੜੀ) - A bonfire festival celebrated on the eve of Maghi when devotees and families circle a sacred fire and offer sesame seeds, jaggery, and peanuts to the fire god for the commencement of the coming longer and warmer days. Lohri is also celebrated as a secular and important cultural festival of Punjab honouring Dulla Bhatti, a Punjabi Muslim zamindar who defied the oppressive Mughal rule by redistributing wealth and saving Punjabi Hindu girls from slavery and persecution under the Mughals. This festival is known as Lal Loi and Bhogi in other parts of South Asia.
- January 14: Maghi (ਮਾਘੀ) - A highly auspicious day marking the sun's journey into the northern hemisphere and the return of warmth and longer days. This day marks the sun's transition into the sign of Makar (Capricorn). It is celebrated with chanting prayers to Surya while taking purifying dips into local waterbodies, rivers, and sarovars and the donation of sesame seeds, jaggery, nuts, and warm clothing to the poor. This festival is known as Makar Sankranti, Pongal, Magh Bihu, Uttarayan, Makara Jyothi, Ghughutiya, Shakrain, and Maghe Sankranti in other parts of South Asia.

== See also ==
- Punjabi calendar
