= Bhadon =

Sixth month of the Punjabi calendar

Bhādõ (Shahmukhi: بھادوں; Gurmukhi: ਭਾਦੋਂ, Punjabi pronunciation: [pàːdːõː]) is the sixth month of the Nanakshahi calendar and Punjabi calendar. The Nanakshahi solar month begins on August 16th, following Sawan, and ends on September 5th, being followed by Asu I. The traditional Punjabi Bikrami lunisolar month begins on the day after the Sawan full moon and ends on the Bhado full moon.

This month coincides with Bhadra in the Hindu calendar and the Indian national calendar, and August and September in the Gregorian and Julian calendars, and is 31 days long.

== Important events during this month ==
=== August ===
- August 16 (1 Bhadon) – The start of the month
- August 30 (15 Bhadon) – The completion of the Sri Guru Granth Sahib (Adi Granth)

=== September ===
- September 1 (17 Bhadon) – First Prakash of the Sri Guru Granth Sahib Ji
- September 12 (28 Bhadon) – Battle of Saragarhi

=== Hindu Festivals Based on Lunar Dates ===
- Bhadon Mondays: Fulam (ਫੁਲਮ) - A day of worship which can be performed on any chosen Monday before Shraadh during the month of Bhadon when flowers especially yellow flowers are offered in household shrines by families to prevent skin diseases and ailments.
- Bhadon 8: Janmashtami (ਜਨਮਾਸ਼ਟਮੀ) - A major Hindu festival commemorating the birth of Krishna, the eighth avatar of Lord Vishnu. Fasts are broken after midnight after singing the arti of Krishna and swinging his idol in a swing. In Punjab, families make seven thapa marks (handprints) using oil and turmeric on the wall on this day during the puja.
- Bhadon 9: Guga Naumi (ਗੁੱਗਾ ਨੌਮੀ) - A day of worship dedicated to Gogaji for protection against snakebites observed with the worship of snakes.
- Bhadon 23: Sutre Vart (ਸੂਤਰ ਵਰਤ) - The first day of a sixteen-day fasting period dedicated to Goddess Mahalakshmi during which a yellow thread with sixteen knots is prepared.
- Bhadon 30: Shraadh (ਸਰਾਧ) - The first day of Shraadh occurs on the last day of Bhadon and continues into the next month, ending on the fifteenth day or masseya (new moon) of Assu.
