= Magghar =

Ninth month of the Punjabi calendar

Magghar (Shahmukhi: مگھر; Gurmukhi: ਮੱਘਰ, Punjabi pronunciation: [mə́gːəɾᵊ]) is the ninth month of the Punjabi calendar as well as the Nanakshahi calendar, which governs the activities within Sikhism. The Nanakshahi solar month begins on November 14th, after Katik I, and ends on December 14th, being followed by Poh. The traditional Punjabi Bikrami lunisolar month begins on the day after the Kattak full moon and ends on the Magghar full moon.

This month coincides with Agrahayana also known as Margshirsh in the Hindu calendar and the Indian national calendar, and November and December in the Gregorian and Julian calendars and is 30 days long.

== Important events during this month ==
=== November ===
- November – Birth Anniversary of Guru Nanak Dev Ji
- November 14 (1 Magghar) – The start of the month Maghar
- November 24 (11 Magghar) – Shaheedi (martyrdom) of Guru Tegh Bahadur Ji
- November 24 (11 Magghar) – Shaheedi of Bhai Mati Das and Bhai Sati Das Ji
- November 24 (11 Magghar) – Gur Gadi of Guru Gobind Singh Ji
- November 28 (15 Magghar) – Birthday of Sahibzada Zorawar Singh Ji

=== December ===
- December 12 (29 Magghar) – Birthday of Sahibzada Fateh Singh Ji
- December 14 (1 Poh) – The end of the month Maghar and the start of Poh

=== Hindu Festivals Based on Lunar Dates ===
- Magghar 8: Kalashtami (ਕਾਲਾਸ਼ਟਮੀ) – A day of rituals and all-night vigils dedicated to Bhairava that is celebrated in Jammu, a region of Greater Punjab. It is not celebrated in other parts of Punjab.

== See also ==
- Punjabi calendar
