= Sawan =

Fifth month of the Punjabi calendar

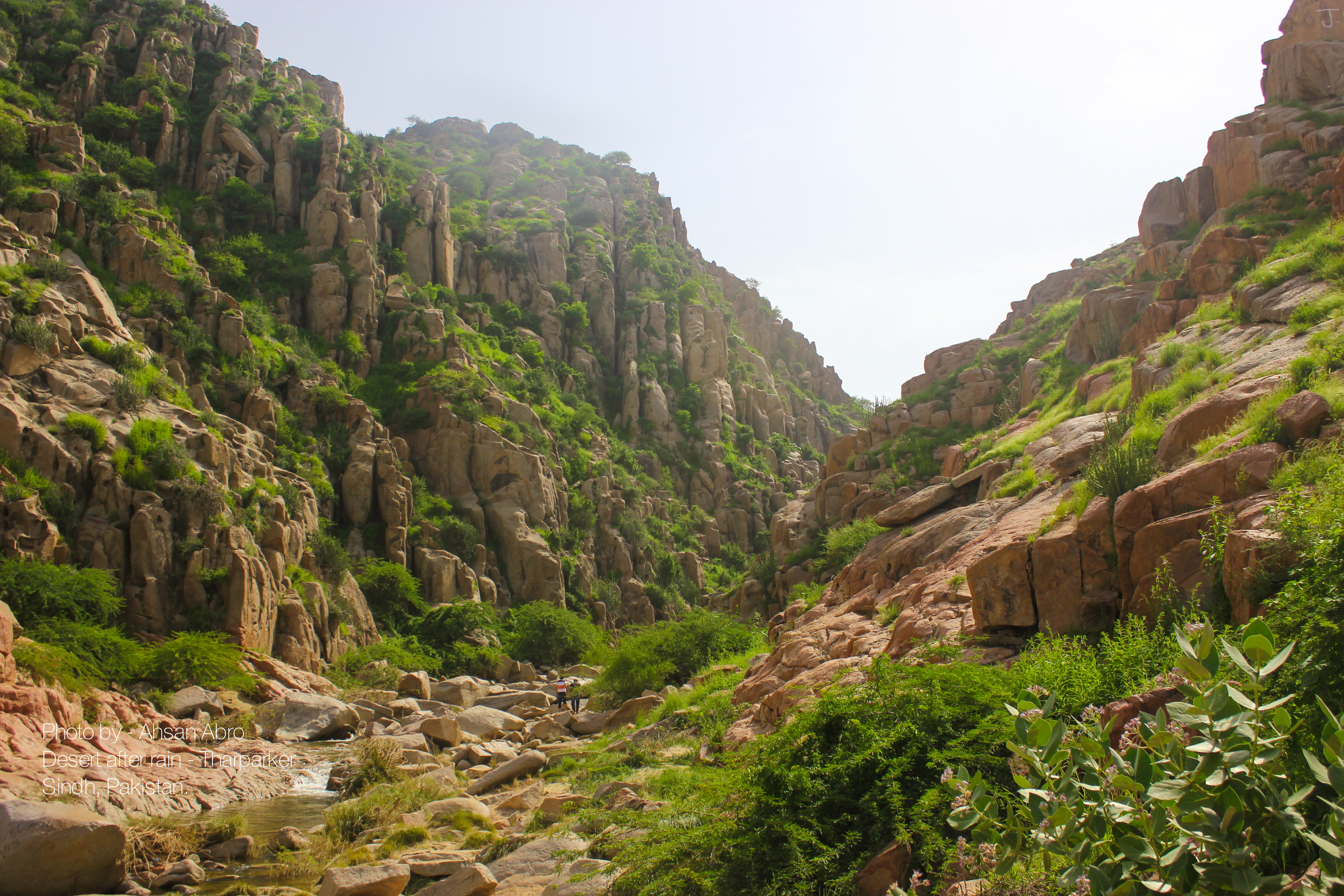

Sāwaṇ or Sāuṇ (Shahmukhi: ساؤݨ; Gurmukhi: ਸਾਵਣ, ਸਾਉਣ, Punjabi pronunciation: [saːʋəɳᵊ, saːʊɳᵊ]) is the fifth month in the Punjabi calendar and the Nanakshahi calendar. The Nanakshahi solar month begins on July 16th, after Harh, and ends on August 16th, being followed by Bhadon. The traditional Punjabi Bikrami lunisolar month begins on the day after the Harh full moon and ends on the Sawan full moon.

Many Indian calendars started in different eras such as the Shaka Calendar (national calendar of India), the traditional Vikrama, and as well as the Nanakshahi calendar which governs the activities within Sikhi. This month coincides with the Sanskrit Shraavana (श्रावण) month in the Hindu calendar and the Indian national calendar, with which it shares derivation, and with July and August in the Gregorian and Julian calendars and is 31 days long, like the Gregorian and Julian calendars.

This month is the most humid month of the year in South Asia.

== Important events during this month ==
=== July ===
- July 16 - Aug 15 (1 Sawan) - The start of the month Sawan
- July 23 (8 Sawan) - Birth of Guru Har Krishan

=== August ===
- August 16 (1 Bhadon) - The end of the month Sawan and the start of Bhadon

=== Hindu Festivals Based on Lunar Dates ===
- Sawan Mondays: Sawan Somvar Vart (ਸਾਵਣ ਸੋਮਵਾਰ ਵਰਤ) - Sacred fasts dedicated to Lord Shiva which are observed on every Monday of the month of Sawan.
- Sawan 18-30: Teeyan (ਤੀਆਂ) - A thirteen day period when married women return to their maternal homes to celebrate the monsoon season and union of Shiva and Parvati with the traditions of giddha, swinging, and singing boliyan. The first day of Teeyan is called Teej.
- Sawan 20: Nag Panchami (ਨਾਗ ਪੰਚਮੀ) - A day of worship dedicated to snakes and Shiva when devotees perform rituals to protect themselves from snakebites.
- Sawan 30: Rakhri (ਰੱਖੜੀ) - The last day of Teeyan celebrated with women and girls tying sacred threads around the wrists of their brothers to signify their bond and protection. Historically, husbands would arrive to the villages of their wives to take them back to their villages of marriage after the wives performed the rite of Rakhri on the last day of Teeyan.

== See also ==
- Punjabi calendar
