= Kattak =

Eighth month of the Punjabi calendar

Kattak (Shahmukhi: کتک; Gurmukhi: ਕੱਤਕ, Punjabi pronunciation: [kət̪ːəkᵊ]), also spelt as Katik, and also known as Katte is the eighth month of the Punjabi calendar and the Nanakshahi calendar. The Nanakshahi solar month of Katik I begins on October 5th, after Asu I, and ends on November 14th, being followed by Maghar. The traditional Punjabi Bikrami lunisolar month begins on the day after the Assu full moon and ends on the Kattak full moon.

This month coincides with Kartik in the Hindu calendar and the Indian national calendar, and October and November in the Gregorian and Julian calendars and is 30 days long.

== Important events during this month ==
=== October ===
- October 15 (1 Kattak) - The start of the month Katak
- October 20 (6 Kattak) - Joti Jot of Guru Har Rai Ji
- October 20 (6 Kattak) - Gur Gadi of the Sri Guru Granth Sahib Ji
- October 20 (6 Kattak) - Gur Gadi of Guru Har Krishan Ji
- October 21 (7 Kattak) - Joti Jot of Guru Gobind Singh Ji

=== November ===
- November 14 (1 Magghar) - The end of the month Katak and the start of Maghar

=== Hindu Festivals Based on Lunar Dates ===
- Kattak 4: Karwa Chauth
- Kattak 8: Chakri,also known as Ahoi Ashtami.
- Kattak 13: Dhanteras
- Kattak 14: Choti Diwali, known as Naraka Chaturdashi in other parts of India.
- Kattak 15: Diwali
- Kattak 16: Govardhan Puja
- Kattak 17: Tika, known as Bhai Dooj in other parts of India.
- Kattak 26-30: Tulsi Viah
- Kattak 30: Kattak Punnia

== See also ==
- Punjabi calendar
