= Harh =

Fourth month of the Punjabi calendar

Hāṛh (Gurmukhi: ਹਾੜ੍ਹ; Shahmukhi: ہاڑھ, Punjabi pronunciation: [ɦáːɽᵊ]) is the fourth month of the Punjabi calendar and the Nanakshahi calendar. The Nanakshahi solar month begins on June 15th, after Jeth I, and ends on July 16th, with Sawan following. The traditional Punjabi Bikrami lunisolar month begins on the day after the Jeth full moon and ends on the Harh full moon.

This month coincides with Ashadha in the Hindu calendar and the Indian national calendar, and June and July of the Gregorian and Julian calendars and is 31 days in length.

== Important events during this month ==
=== June ===
- June 15 (1 Harh) - The start of the month Harh
- June 16 (2 Harh) - Shaheedi (Martyrdom) of Guru Arjan Dev Ji

=== July ===
- July 2 (18 Harh) - Formation of Sri Akal Takht
- July 5 (21 Harh) - Birth of Guru Har Gobind Ji / 21 Harh
- July 16 (1 Sawan) - The end of the month Harh and the start of Sawan

=== Hindu Festivals Based on Lunar Dates ===
- Harh 30: Guru Punnia (ਗੁਰੂ ਪੁੰਨਿਆ) - A day commemorating ancient sages and scholars such as Veda Vyasa, the author of the Mahabharata. Hindus express gratitude to their gurus (spiritual teachers) on their day and offer dakshina to their gurus.

== See also ==
- Punjabi calendar
