= Magh (Punjabi calendar) =

Eleventh month of the Punjabi calendar

Māgh (Shahmukhi: ماگھ; Gurmukhi: ਮਾਘ, Punjabi pronunciation: [máːgᵊ]) is the eleventh month of the Punjabi calendar as well as the Nanakshahi calendar, which governs the activities within Sikhism. The Nanakshahi solar month begins on January 13, after Poh, and ends on February 12, being followed by Phagan. The traditional Punjabi Bikrami lunisolar month begins on the day after the Poh full moon and ends on the Magh full moon.

This month coincides with Magha in the Hindu calendar and the Indian national calendar, and January and February in the Gregorian and Julian calendars and is 30 days long.

== Important events during this month ==
=== January ===
- January 14 (1 Māgh) - The start of the month Magh
- January 31 (19 Māgh) - Birth of Guru Har Rai Ji

=== February ===
- February 11 (30 Māgh) - Birthday of Sahibzada Ajit Singh Ji
- February 12 (1 Phaggan) - The end of the month Magh and the start of Phaggan

=== Hindu Festivals Based on Lunar Dates ===
- Magh 4: Sakat Chauth/Bhugga (ਸਕਟ ਚੌਥ/ਭੁੱਗਾ) - A day of fasting dedicated to Ganesha and observed by mothers for their children. Special sweets made of til (sesame) and gur (jaggery) along with pinnis which are round sweet balls made of wheat flour, ghee, and sugar.
- Magh 20: Basant/Basant Panchami (ਬਸੰਤ/ਬਸੰਤ ਪੰਚਮੀ) - A festival dedicated to Goddess Saraswati commemorating the arrival of spring when people wear yellow to mirror the blooming mustard fields. After Saraswati Puja is performed in the morning and sweeted yellow rice is eaten as parshad, families fly kites for the remainder of the day.

=== Hindu Festivals Based on Solar Dates ===
The following festivals may fall in the month of Poh or Magh:

- January 13: Lohri (ਲੋਹੜੀ) - A bonfire festival celebrated on the eve of Maghi when devotees and families circle a sacred fire and offer sesame seeds, jaggery, and peanuts to the fire god for the commencement of the coming longer and warmer days. Lohri is also celebrated as a secular and important cultural festival of Punjab honouring Dulla Bhatti, a Punjabi Muslim zamindar who defied the oppressive Mughal rule by redistributing wealth and saved Punjabi Hindu girls from slavery and persecution under the Mughals. This festival is known as Lal Loi and Bhogi in other parts of South Asia.
- January 14: Maghi (ਮਾਘੀ) - A highly auspicious day marking the sun's journey into the northern hemisphere and the return of warmth and longer days. This day marks the sun's transition into the sign of Makar (Capricorn). It is celebrated with chanting prayers to Surya while taking purifying dips into local waterbodies, rivers, and sarovars and the donation of sesame seeds, jaggery, nuts, and warm clothing to the poor. This festival is known as Makar Sankranti, Pongal, Magh Bihu, Uttarayan, Makara Jyothi, Ghughutiya, Shakrain, and Maghe Sankranti in other parts of South Asia.

== See also ==
- Punjabi calendar
