= Assu =

Seventh month of the Punjabi calendar

Assū (Shahmukhi: اسو; Gurmukhi: ਅੱਸੂ, Punjabi pronunciation: [əsːuː]), also spelt as Asu, is the seventh month of the Punjabi calendar, as well as the Nanakshahi calendar, which governs the Sikh tradition. The Nanakshahi solar month of Asu I begins on September 5th, after Bhadon, and ends on October 5th, being followed by Katik I. The traditional Punjabi Bikrami lunisolar month begins on the day after the Bhadon full moon and ends on the Assu full moon.

This month coincides with Ashvin in the Hindu calendar and the Indian national calendar, and September and October in the Gregorian and Julian calendars and is 30 days long.

== Important events during this month ==
=== September ===
- September 15 (1 Assu) - The start of the month Assu
- September 16 (2 Assu) - Joti Jot of Guru Amar Das Ji
- September 16 (2 Assu) - Gur Gadi of Guru Ram Das Ji
- September 16 (2 Assu) - Joti Jot of Guru Ram Das Ji
- September 16 (2 Assu) - Gur Gadi of Guru Arjan Dev Ji
- September 18 (4 Assu) - Gur Gadi of Guru Angad Dev Ji
- September 22 (8 Assu) - Joti Jot of Guru Nanak Dev Ji

=== October ===
- October 9 (25 Assu) - Birth of Guru Ram Das Ji
- October 15 (1 Katak) - The end of the month Assu and the start of Katak

=== Hindu Festivals Based on Lunar Dates ===
- Assu 1-15: Shraadh (ਸਰਾਧ) - A sixteen day period when Hindus honour and perform rites dedicated to their deceased ancestors which begins on the last day of Bhadon and ends on the 15th day of Assu. It is known as Pitru Paksha in other parts of India
- Assu 8: Sutre Vart (ਸੂਤਰ ਵਰਤ) - The last day of the sixteen-day Mahalakshmi fasting period when fasts are broken on this day after offering prayers to the moon and stars.
- Assu 16-23: Naurate (ਨਰਾਤੇ) - The major Hindu 9 day festival of fasting, dancing, and merrymaking dedicated to Goddess Durga and her avatars which is also known in Punjab as Sanjhi (ਸਾਂਝੀ) and as Navratri in other parts of India. It is observed with the sowing of barley in household pots and the tradition of making a barota (banyan tree) and Sanjhi Mata (Goddess Parvati) out of earthen material to worship for nine days.
- Assu 22: Durga Atthe (ਦੁਰਗਾ ਅੱਠੇ) - The 8th day of Naurate when young girls are worshipped as forms of the goddess in a rite called kanjakan when puris with kala chana along with halwa is offered as parshad. It is known as Durga Ashtami in other parts of India
- Assu 23: Maha Naumi (ਮਹਾਂ ਨੌਮੀ) - The 9th day of Naurate. Fasts are usually broken on this day or on the 8th day of Naurate. It is known as Maha Navami in other parts of India
- Assu 24: Dushehra (ਦੁਸ਼ਹਿਰਾ) - The 10th day culminating Naurate which celebrates the victory of Durga over Mahishasura and Rama over Ravana. The earthen made Sanjhi Mata is immersed in local waterbodies during the early morning and the offerings collected during the nine days are offered to ants and banyan trees. The barley shoots are placed on the ears of Punjabi Hindu men and boys by their sisters. It is known as Vijayadashami in other parts of India.
- Assu 30: Gadbade (ਗੜਬੜੇ) - The full moon and last day of Assu when Punjabi and Haryanvi Hindu children carry decorated earthen pots containing lamps and go house to house to collect money and sweets. It is believed to be the day when Radha and Krishna performed the raslila. It is known as Sharada Purnima in other parts of India.

== See also ==
- Punjabi calendar
