= Maghi =

Indian harvest festival

- Observed by: Punjabis
- Type: Religious and cultural
- Significance: Midwinter festival, celebration of winter solstice
- Celebrations: eating traditional food, temple celebrations
- Date: 14 January
- Frequency: Annual
- Related to: Makar Sankranti, Lohri

Maghi is a Punjabi cultural festival, the Indian harvest festival celebrated on winter solstice. Maghi falls on the first day of the month of Magh and is celebrated in Punjab, Haryana, Jammu and Himachal Pradesh. It follows on the heels of the mid-winter festival of Lohri which is marked by bonfires in North Indian fields and yards. The next morning is seen as an auspicious occasion for ritual bathing in ponds and rivers.

In Himachal Pradesh, the festival is also known as Maghi Saaji or Magha Ra Saza. It is known as Maghi Sangrand or Uttarain (Uttarayana) in Jammu and Sakrat in Haryana.

== In Hinduism ==
Makar Sankranti always falls on the first day of the month of Magha in the Vikram Samvat calendar. On Maghi, when the sun takes its northern journey on entering the sign of Makara or Capricorn, the Hindus take a bath in the River Ganga, or if that is not possible, in some other river, rivulet, canal, or pond. In the ancient Indian epic the Mahabharata, it was on Maghi (Makar Sankranti) that Bhishma attained mukti (liberation) after having heard discourses about the mysteries of life and death since Kartik Purnima during the Mahabharata War.

It follows the festival of Lohri in north India, particularly popular in the Punjab region.

=== Himachal Pradesh ===
Maghi is popularly referred to as Magha Ra Saza in some parts of Himachal Pradesh. As Magh is the coldest month in the hills when agriculture comes to a standstill, this month is dedicated to worship of Agni. In the villages of Himachal, Lohri night is part of Maghi celebrations and is referred to as Masant. Another ritual associated with Maghi is Madraison Puja when the houses are cleaned and decorated.

== In Sikhism ==
For Sikhs it is a community gathering to commemorate martyrdom of forty Sikhs (Chalis Mukte) who once had deserted the tenth and last human Guru of Sikhism, Guru Gobind Singh at Anandpur Sahib, but later rejoined the Guru and died while fighting the Mughal Empire army led by Wazir Khan in 1705. Sikhs make a pilgrimage to the site of the war, and take a holy dip in the sacred water pond of Gurdwara Sri Tootti Ganddi Sahib in Muktsar.

A fair (mela) is held at Muktsar every year and called the Mela Maghi which is held in memory of the forty Sikh martyrs. Before this tradition started to commemorate the Sikh martyrs who gave their lives to protect the tenth Guru, the festival was observed and mentioned by Guru Amar Das, the third Guru of Sikhism.

== Cultural celebration ==
In Punjab, Maghi is celebrated by eating kheer such as rauh di kheer which is an old dish where rice is cooked in sugarcane juice. The dish is prepared in the evening before Maghi and is kept to cool. It is served cold next morning on Maghi with red-chili mixed curd. In some parts of Punjab, India, it is also traditional practice to eat khichdi mixed with lentils, consume raw sugarcane and jaggery, Fairs are held at many places in Punjab on Maghi.

According to the Indian Panorma, "Maghi is observed across Punjab as:

- The beginning of the new agricultural year.
- A time for settling land leases and accounts.
- A marker of seasonal transition and renewed labour."

== See also ==
- Magh Mela
- Mela Maghi
- Makar Sankranti
- Sankranti
- Thai Pongal
- Winter solstice
- Lohri
- Maghe Sankranti
