= Buisu =

Tripuri new year

Buisu Tripuri New Year
- Official name: Buisu
- Observed by: Tripuri
- Type: Social, Cultural, Religious
- Significance: Tripuri New Year
- Celebrations: Three days
- Begins: First day of the
- Date: 12-14 April
- Frequency: Annual
- Related to: South and Southeast Asian solar New Year

Buisu is the new year festival of Tripuri People of Tripura state in India and Bangladesh.

The word buisu has been derived from the Tripuri language Tripuri root word bisi which means a year. Buisu is one of the ancient Tripuri/Tripura festival celebrated with lot of joy enthusiasm in every Tripuri/Tripura household.

== See also ==
- Indian New Year's days
- Tripuri calendar
