= Hola Mohalla =

Annual Sikh festival

Holla Mohalla ਹੋਲਾ-ਮਹੱਲਾ
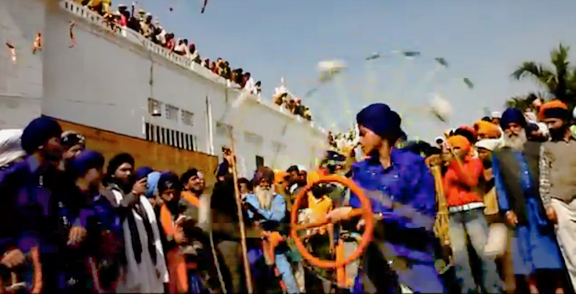
- The Khalsa celebrating the Sikh festival Hola Mohalla or simply Hola.
- Also called: Hola
- Observed by: Sikhs
- Type: Sikhism
- Celebrations: Three-day fair at the Anandpur Sahib ending on Hola Mohalla, Martial arts
- Date: Second day of lunar month of Chet
- Frequency: Annual
- Related to: Holi, Shigmo and Yaosang

Hola Mohalla (Gurmukhi: ਹੋਲਾ-ਮਹੱਲਾ hōlā muhalā), also called Hola, is a three-day long Sikh festival which normally falls in March. It takes place on the second day of the lunar month of Chett, usually a day after the Hindu spring festival of Holi, but sometimes coincides with it. Hola Mohalla is a big festive event for Sikhs around the world.

The fair held during Holi and Hola at Anandpur Sahib is traditionally a three-day event but pilgrims visit Anandpur Sahib for a week, camping out and enjoying various displays of fighting prowess and bravery, and listening to kirtan, music and poetry. For meals, which is an integral part of the Sikh institution (Gurdwara), visitors sit together in Pangats (queues) and eat lacto-vegetarian food of the Langars. The event concludes on the day of Hola Mohalla with a long, "military-style" procession near Takht Kesgarh Sahib, one of the five seats of temporal authority (referred as "Panj Takht") of the Sikhs.

== Etymology ==
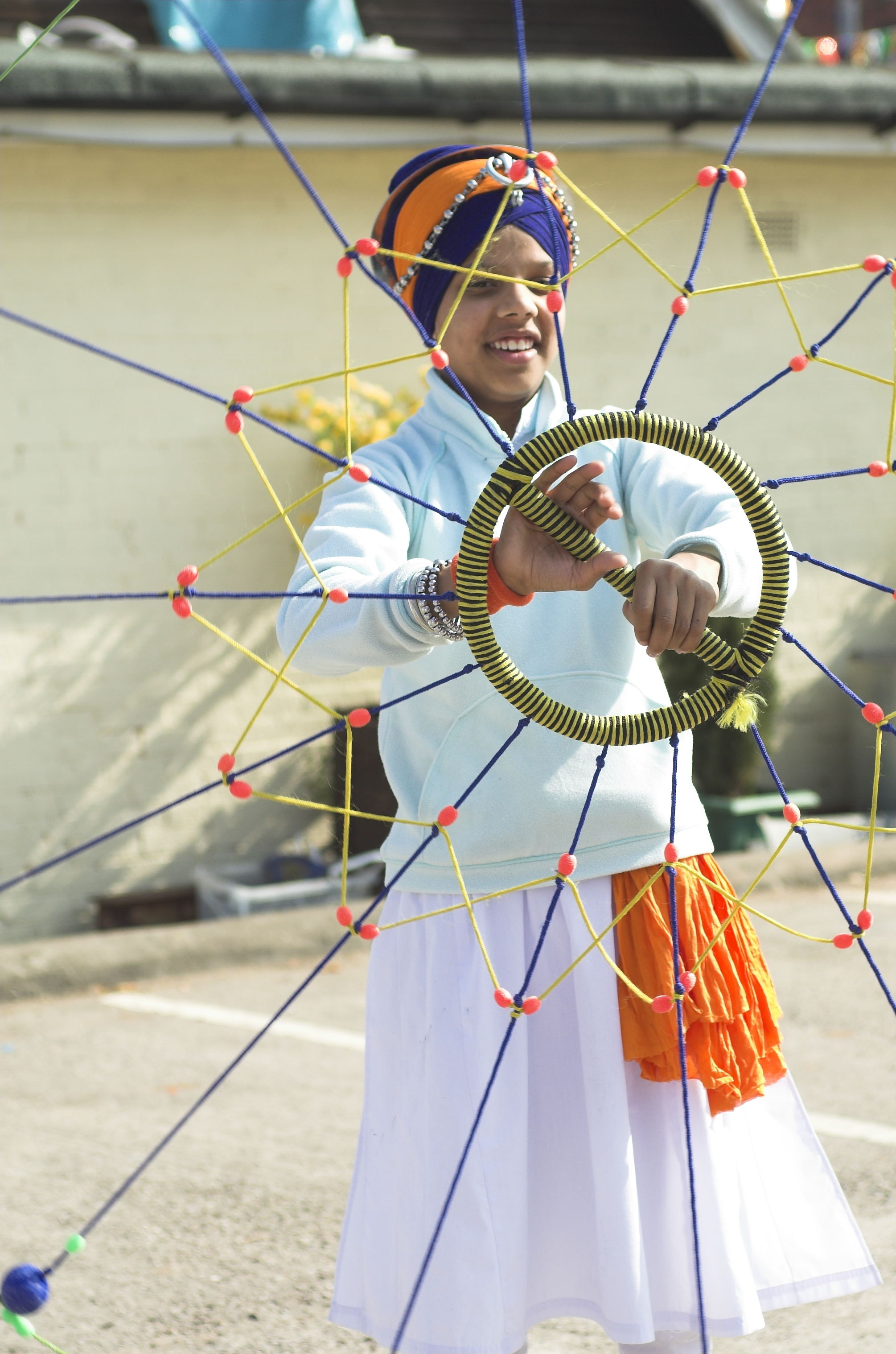
A young practitioner with chakari

Bhai Kahan Singh, who compiled the Mahan Kosh, the first Sikh encyclopedia, at the turn of the 20th century, explained, "Hola is derived from the word halla (a military charge) and the term mohalla stands for an organized procession or an army column. The words 'Hola Mohalla' would thus mean 'the charge of an army.' " Dr. M.S. Ahluwalia notes that the related Punjabi term mahalia (which was derived from the root hal, meaning to alight or descend) refers to "an organized procession in the form of an army column accompanied by war drums and standard-bearers, and proceeding to a given location or moving in state from one to another."

Hola is a Sanskrit word meant to be distinguished from Holi, the Hindu spring festival of colors (Holi) which takes place the day before Hola Mohalla.

== History ==
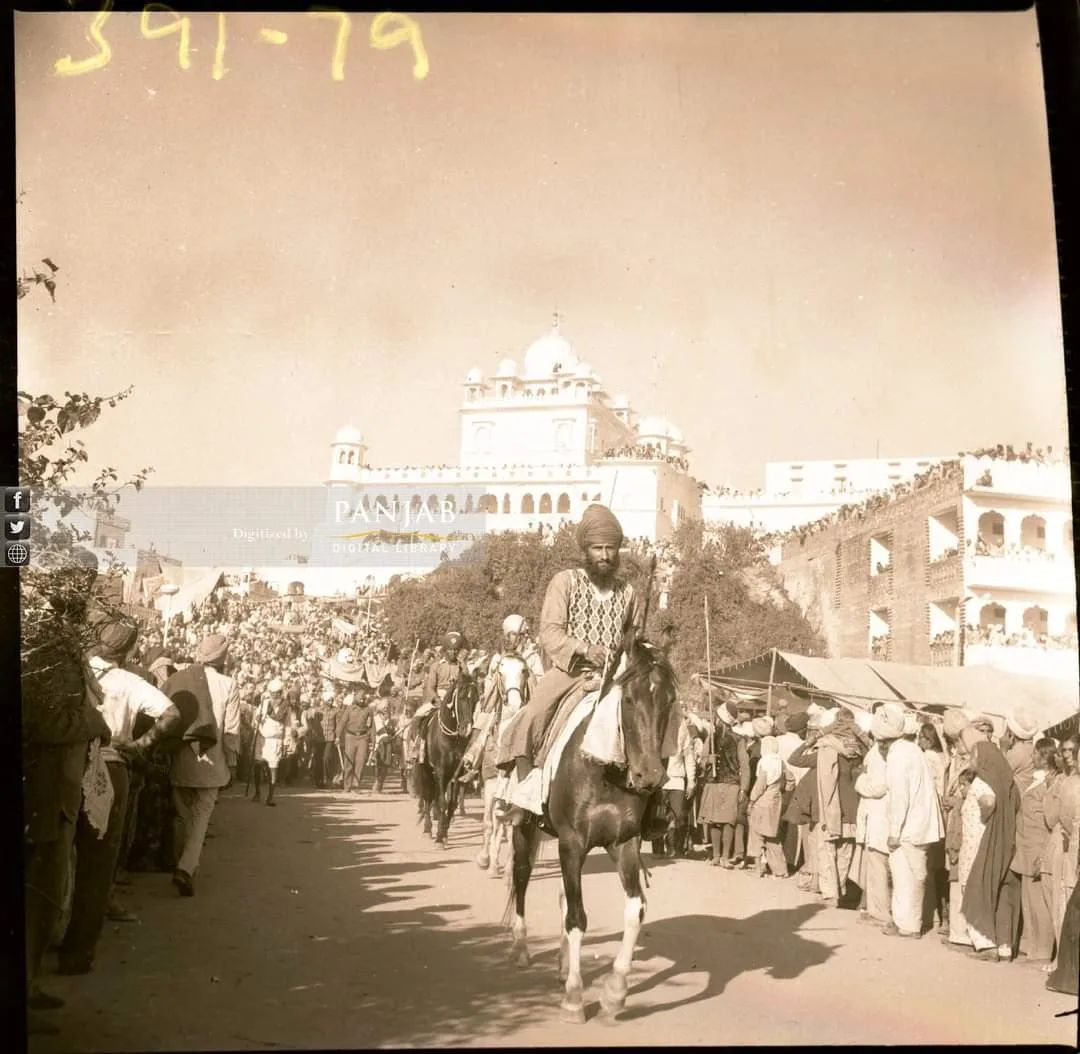
A vintage photograph from 1979 of Hola Mohalla being celebrated at Anandpur Sahib. Digitized by Panjab Digital Library.

Hola Mohalla builds upon the Spring festival of Holi. The Guru Granth Sahib contains passages prescribing the celebration of Holi by serving God. The colours of Holi manifest in the Lord's love. (Note: The celebration is described as follows: One Universal Creator God. By The Grace Of The True Guru: I serve the Guru, and humbly bow to Him. Today I am in supreme bliss. My anxiety is dispelled, and I have met the Lord of the Universe. Today, it is springtime in my household. I sing Your Glorious Praises, O Infinite Lord God. Today, I am celebrating the festival of Phalgun. Joining with God's companions, I have begun to play. I celebrate the festival of Holi by serving the Saints (Lord). I am imbued with the deep crimson colour of the Lord's Divine Love. My mind and body have blossomed forth, in utter, incomparable beauty. They do not dry out in either sunshine or shade; they flourish in all seasons. It is always springtime, when I meet with the Divine Guru. The wish-fulfilling Elysian Tree has sprouted and grown. It bears flowers and fruits, jewels of all sorts. I am satisfied and fulfilled, singing the Glorious Praises of the Lord. Servant Nanak meditates on the Lord, Har, Har, Har (God).) As Holi starts with Holika Dahan on the full moon night of Phagan or Phalguna, the festival of Holi is referred to as the festival of Phalguna even though the actual day of Holi falls on the first day of the lunar month of Chett. Guru Gobind Singh built upon this method of celebrating Holi by adding a martial element and creating Hola Mohalla to be celebrated a day after Holi.

The festival also has roots in the story of the child Prahlada who would not accept his father, Hiranyakashipu, as god. According to Gandhi (2007), "in order to please her brother, Holka planned to burn Prahlad. She took him in her lap, sat in the midst of a heap of easily combustible straw". Holika thought she would be protected by a cloth but it was Prahlada who survived and Holika perished in the fire. The event gave rise to the belief that good triumphed over evil. According to regional tradition, Harnaksh (Hiranyakashipu), the King of Multan, was defeated by good in the form of Prahlada. According to Lorenzen (1996), the story of Prahlada was popular with the early Sikhs. The Guru Granth contains verses reciting Prahald by the saints Namdev and Kabir, and also by the third Guru Amar Das.

=== Customs ===
Guru Gobind Singh, the tenth Sikh Guru built upon the story of Prahlad and founded the festival of Hola Mohalla. According to Thompson (2000), Guru Gobind Singh established Hola Mohalla in the spring of 1701. Similarly, Cole (1994) states that Guru Gobind Singh summoned his followers to attend Anandpur on Holi when he introduced a new rally in 1680 to coincide with Holi where his followers could practice manoeuvres and combat training. However, Guru Gobind Singh organised the first procession accompanied by drums in Anandpur on 22 February 1701 A.D. The new tradition of overseeing mock battles and poetry contests at Lohgarh Fort has since spread from the town of Anandpur Sahib to nearby Kiratpur Sahib and the foothills of the Shivaliks, and to other Gurdwaras around the world. According to Singh (2018), "during the celebrations of Hola Mohalla a sword is most in demand at Nanded, since each participant in the procession must have it in his hand".

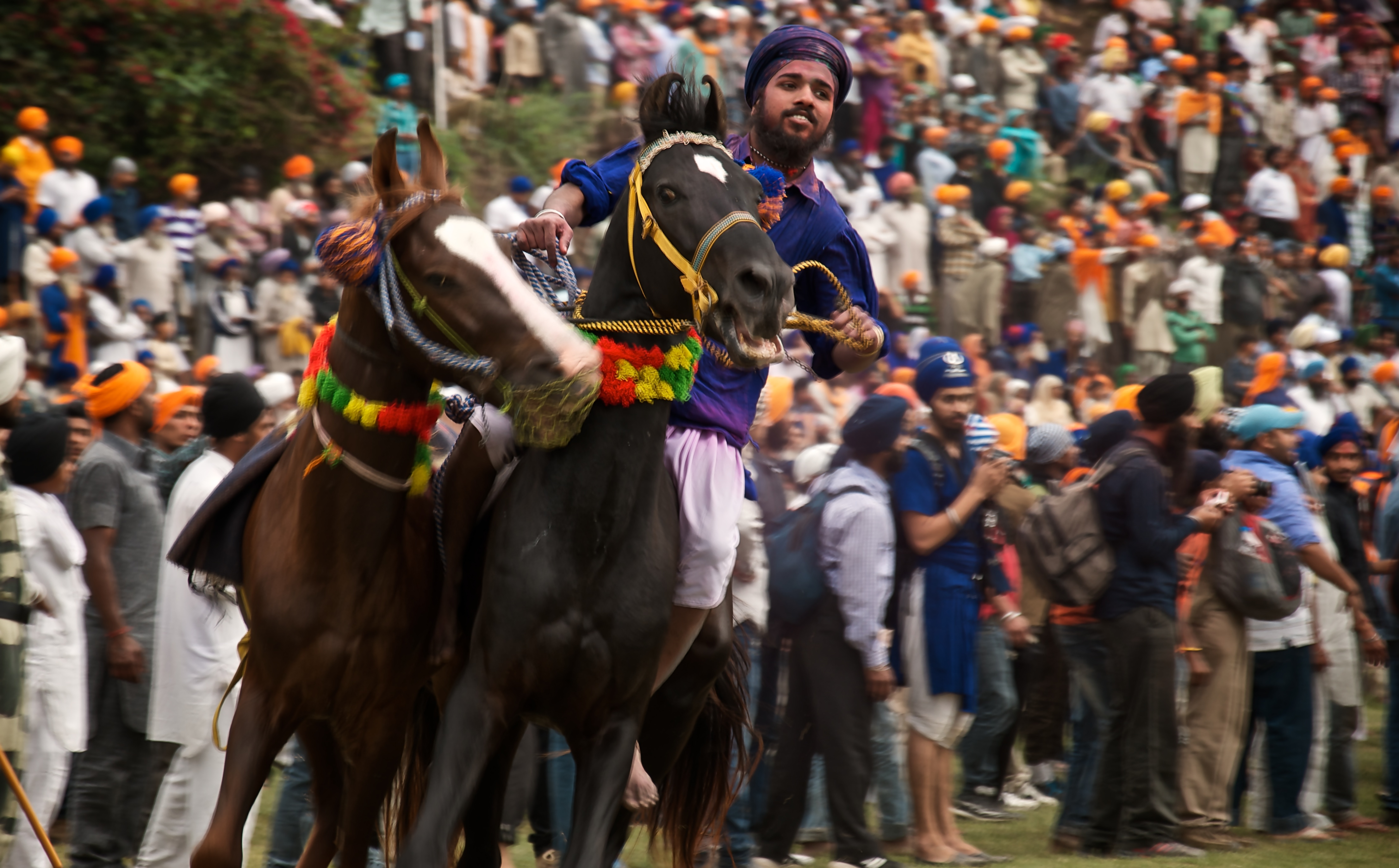
Hola Mohalla festival and sports, Anandpur Sahib Punjab India

=== Colours ===
According to Guru Gobind Singh's court poet Bhai Nand Lal, colours were thrown by the participants after completion of the mock battles: rose water, amber, musk and saffron-coloured water was used. Sikh tradition holds that Guru Gobind Singh also participated in the colourful festival with the use of gulal which has survived into modern times with Nihangs "splashing gulal (red farinaceous powder) on each other and the audience". The alternative view is that the practice of throwing colours was not observed by Guru Gobind Singh.

== Details ==
Hola Mahalla is a Sikh event which takes place on the second day of the lunar month of Chet, which usually falls in March.

Mahalia, is a Punjabi word that implies an organized procession in the form of an army column accompanied by war drums and standard-bearers, and proceeding to a given location or moving in state from one place to another.

Holi, when people playfully sprinkle colored powders, dry or mixed in water, on each other on the first day of Chet was given a new dimension by establishing Hola to be celebrated a day after. However, Guru Gobind Singh (1666–1708) held the first march at Anandpur on Chet vadi 1, 1757 Bk (22 February 1701) and therefore festivities start before the second of Chet. In Anandpur Sahib, the festival lasts for three days.

The Guru made Hola Mahalla an occasion for the Sikhs to demonstrate their martial skills in simulated battles. This was probably done to forestall a grimmer struggle against the imperial power and channeling people's energy into a more useful activity. Hola Mahalla became an annual event held in an open ground near Holgarh, a fort across the rivulet Charan Ganga, northwest of Anandpur sahib.

The popularity of this festival may be judged from the fact that out of five Sikh public holidays requested by the Khalsa Diwan, of Lahore in 1889, the Government approved only two - Hola Mahalla and the birth anniversary of Guru Nanak. Hola Mahalla is presently the biggest festival at Anandpur.

== Anandpur Sahib ==
Anandpur Sahib (lit. City of Bliss) is situated on one of the lower spurs of the Shiwalik Hills in Rupnagar District of Punjab and is well connected with the rest of the country both by road and rail. It lies 31 km north of Rupnagar (Ropar) and 29 km south of Nangal Township. Being one of the supremely important historical centers of the Sikhs it has been reverently called Anandpur Sahib. It was here at Anandpur that on Baisakhi of 1699, Guru Gobind Singh inaugurated the Khalsa and the Panj Piare (the five beloved ones); hence inaugurating the order of Saint-Soldiers who pledged their dedication to defend the needy, poor and oppressed and their respective social, economic and political rights. This was a tradition of one of the world's greatest martyrs Guru Tegh Bahadur (the 9th Guru) who laid down his life in the defense of the Hindus on behalf of the Pandits of Kashmir.

The order of the Khalsa, at the wish of Guru Gobind Singh's would henceforth be distinguished by five symbols (a uniform of 5Ks), viz. Kes (uncut hair), Kangha (comb), Kacherra (drawers), Kara (an all-steel bracelet) and Kirpan (a sword) so that they could easily be recognized by anyone under attack. Sikhs were further instructed to live to the highest ethical standards, and to be always ready to fight tyranny and injustice.

== Nihang Singhs ==
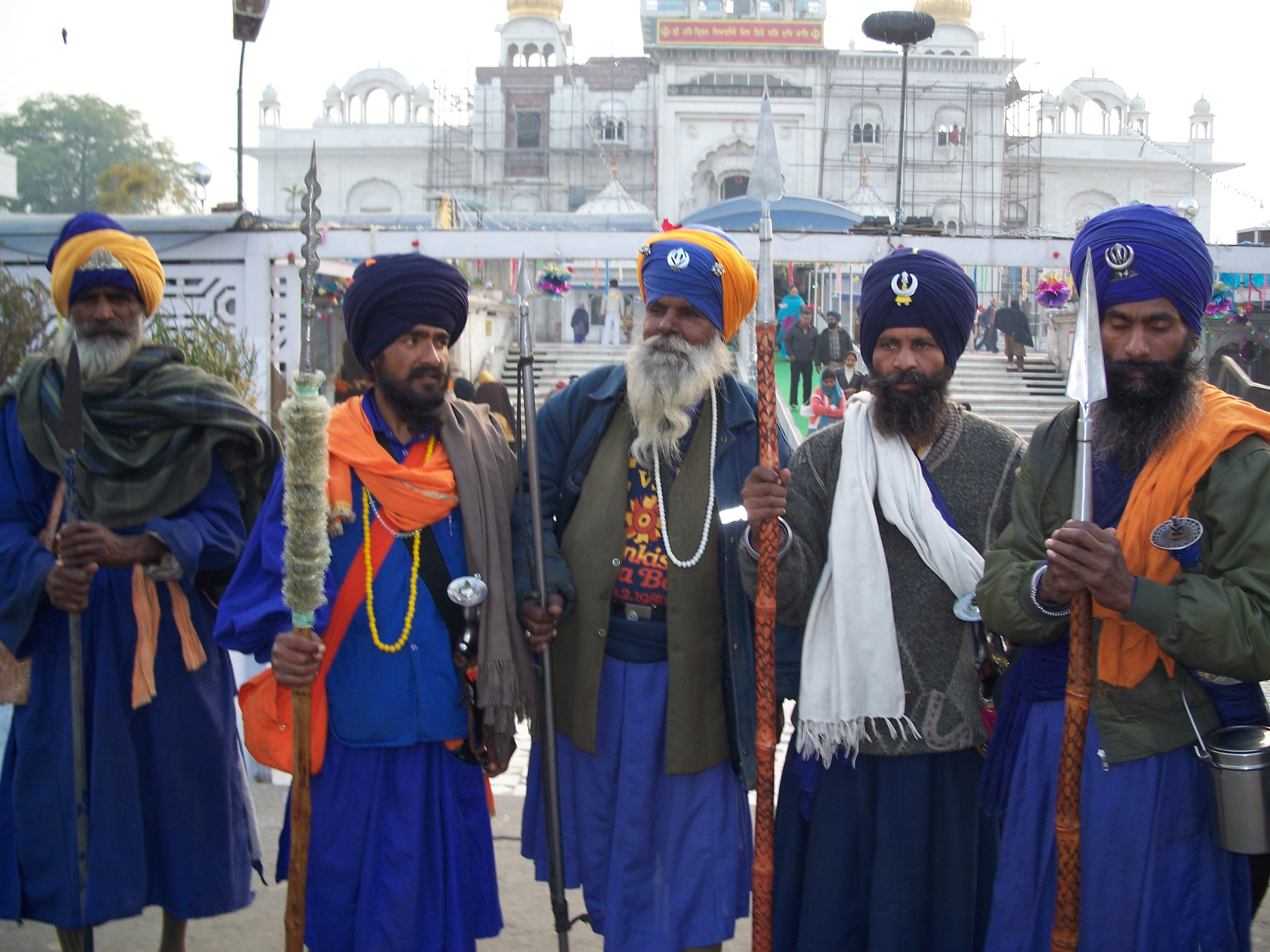
A group of Nihang Singhs

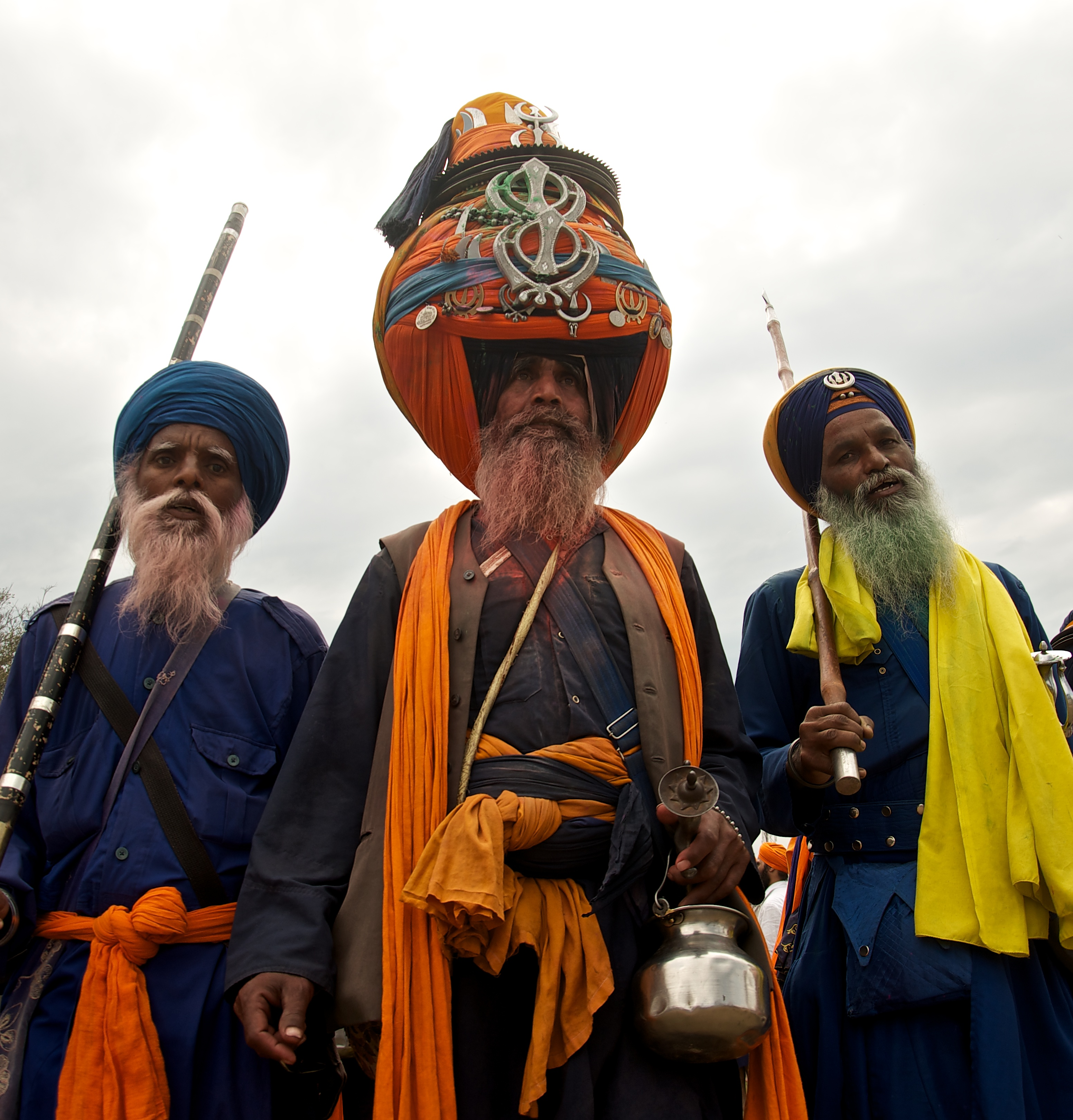
Sikhs gathered at Hola Mohalla Holi festival in Anandpur Sahib

The Nihang are the members of the Khalsa Army known for their distinctive blue traditional robes and dumala, which are often embellished. They are prominent at the Hola Mahalla festival.
