= Fasli calendar =

Harvest-based calendar system

Fasli calendar or Fasli era (Fasli; Urdu: فصلی, Arabic: فصلى; lit. 'Harvest') is a set of harvest-based calendar system that was used across South Asia during Mughal and British period but today is mainly used in the Deccan. The Fasli calendars are of two different systems: luni-solar and fully solar year counting. A version of fully solar Fasli calendar was the official calendar of Hyderabad Deccan.

The lunisolar Fasli calendar begins in September, after the Bhadra full moon day. It retains the Indian month names and the Purnimanta system of month reckoning but employs solar years. However instead of separate fortnight counting popular in India, this calendar employs 29/30 full number of days. This was the accepted native calendar system in courts of Behar and Benares provinces during British India.

The solar Fasli year, again, has two versions: one current in the Deccan and another hisotorically used in Bombay province. The Deccan Fasli year is a period of 12 months from July to June. In both systems, adding 590 to solar Fasli year comes to Gregorian calendar, corresponding Gregorian year for Fasli year 1410 was from July 2000 – June 2001.

== Formation ==
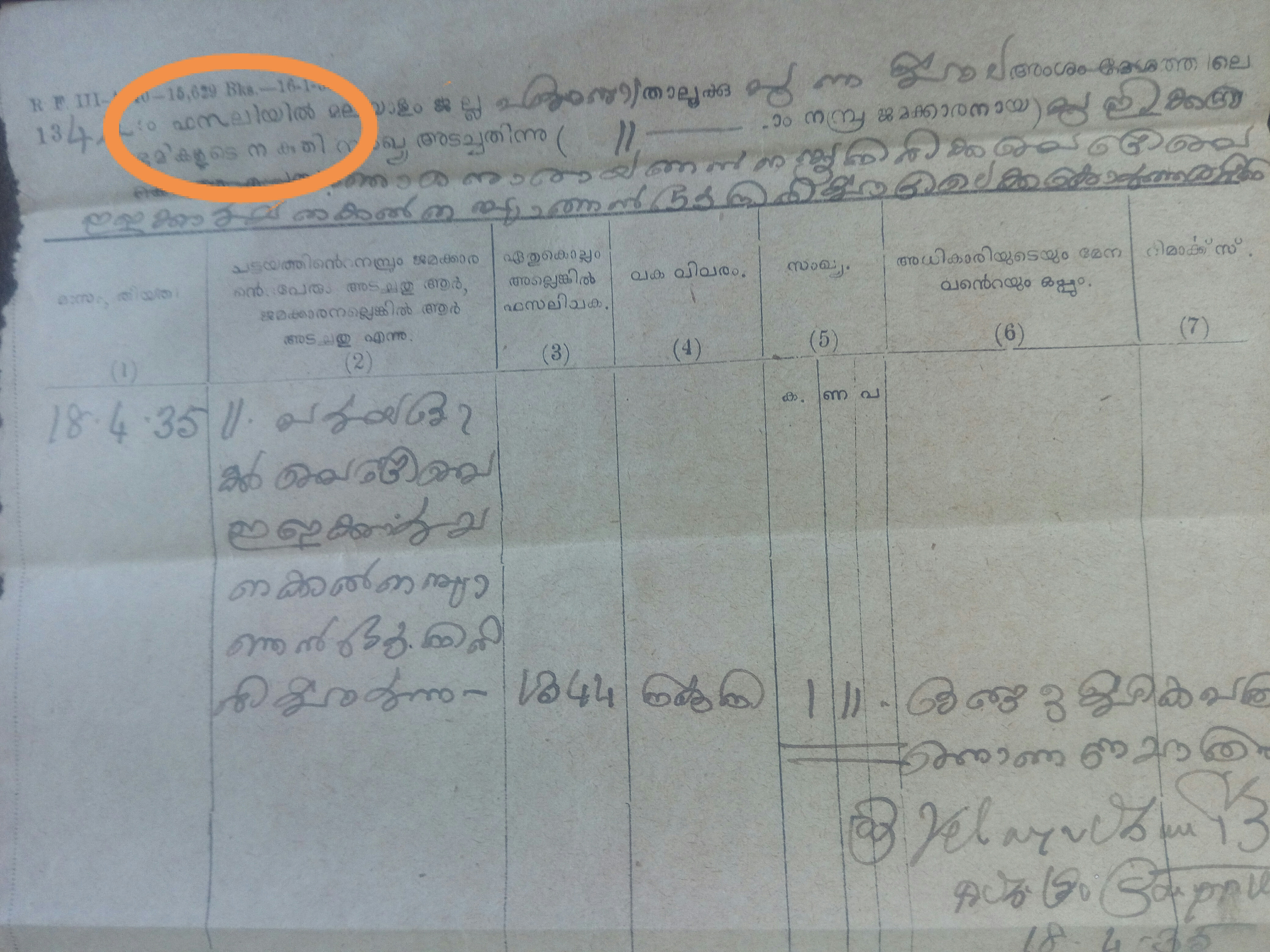
a document with fasli reference from Kerala, india

The calendar formation year is considered as 963 Hijra (A. H.) in the Islamic calendar. From that year onward, the Fasli calendar has been a solar year. The name and number of the Days and the Months are the same as Islamic calendar. The first day of the year is 7 or 8 June.

The Fasli calendar dated from the accession year of Akbar. Thus the beginning of the Fasli era is equal to below calendars.

- 963 AH (Islamic calendar)
- 1556 AD (Julian calendar)
- 1612 SE (Hindu Samavat Calendar)

== History ==
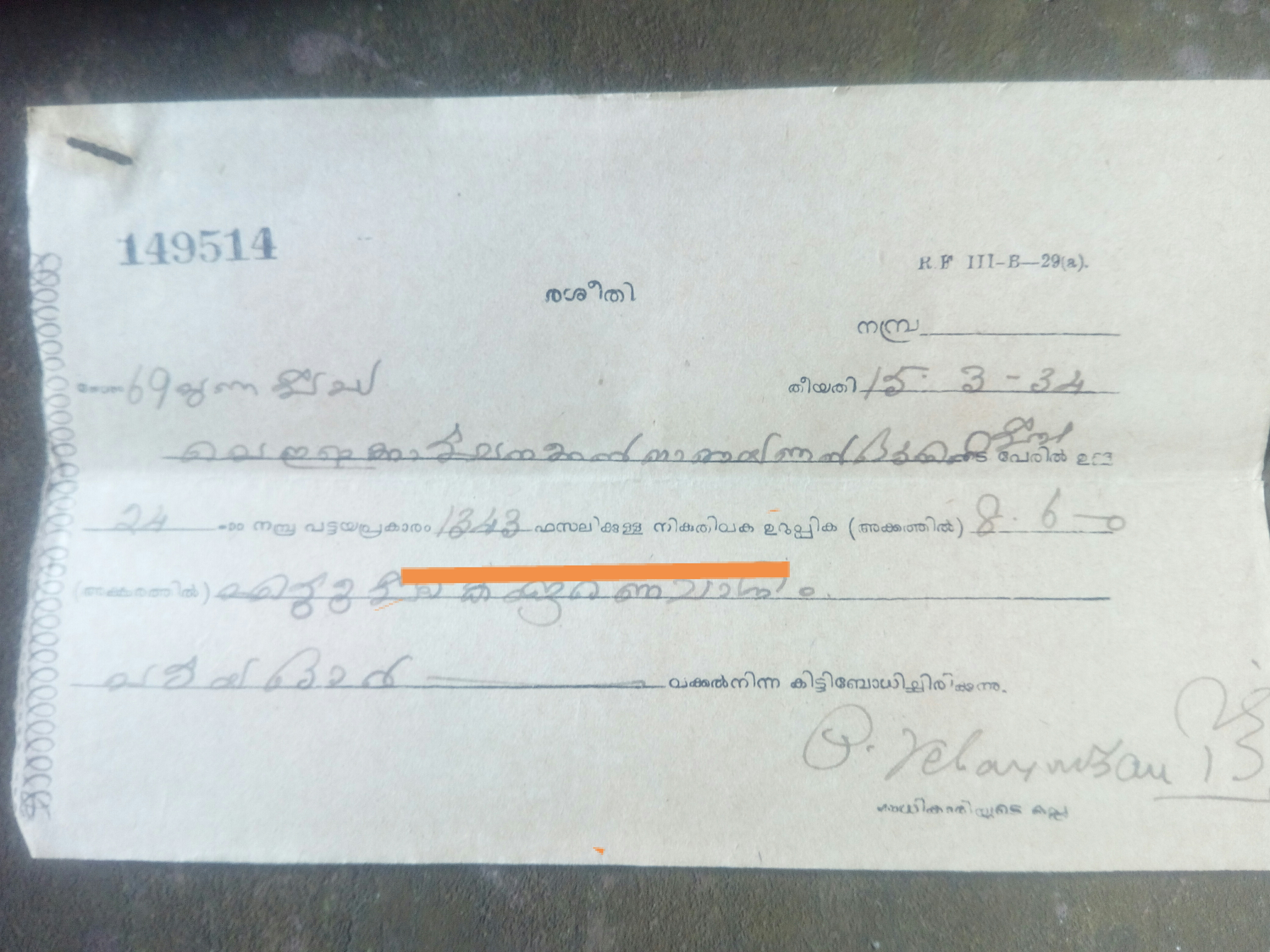
another document of fasliyear 1343 ic. AD 1933

Fasli Calendar is a chronological system introduced by the Mughal emperor Akbar basically for land revenue and records purposes in northern India, The differences in records dates due to the Muslim lunar calendar because of moon sighting have led him to introduce an alternate calendar which follows simultaneously with Islamic Lunar calendar and Hindu Samavat solar Calendar. Which can give the fixed dating system.

Akbar insistence to equalize the Fasli calendar according to Islamic calendar accordingly with Hindu calendar, thus he took 649 years from the Hindu calendar year to make the Fasli year 963. Since then, the Fasli calendar proceeded according to the Hindu calendar.

=== Introduction in Deccan ===
Shah Jahan the grandson of Akbar, introduced the Fasli Calendar to Deccan Suba (South India) in 1630 AD, which continued as an official calendar of Asaf Jahi rulers of the Hyderabad State, until last Nizam, Mir Osman Ali Khan acceded the Hyderabad State to the Indian Union.

== Current status ==
After the accession of the Hyderabad State, the Nizam continued as the Rajpramukh (princely Head of State) and used to follow the Fasli calendar in his official sanctions and records. Currently Andhra Pradesh State Wakf Board, Nizam Trust follows the Fasli calendar simultaneously with Gregorian calendar and Islamic calendar to maintain records. The Andhra Pradesh Government, Karnataka Government and the Tamil Nadu Government still use Fasli year in all of their revenue and judiciary purposes.
