= Jeth =

Third month of the Punjabi calendar

Jeṭh (Shahmukhi: جیٹھ; Gurmukhi: ਜੇਠ) is a third month of the Punjabi calendar and the Nanakshahi calendar, which governs the activities within Sikhism. The Nanakshahi solar month begins on May 5th, after Vaisakh, and ends on June 15th, with Harh following. The traditional Punjabi Bikrami lunisolar month begins on the day after the Vaisakh full moon and ends on the Jeth full moon.

This month coincides with Jyeshtha in the Hindu calendar and the Indian national calendar, and May and June in the Gregorian and Julian calendars and is 31 days long.

== Important events during this month ==
=== May ===
- May 15 (1 Jeth) - The start of the month Jeth
- May 23 (9 Jeth) - Birth of Guru Amar Das

=== June ===
- June 11 (28 Jeth) - Gur Gadi of Guru Har Gobind
- June 15 (1 Harh) - The end of the month Jeth and the start of Harh

=== Hindu Festivals Based on Lunar Dates ===
- Jeth 30: Sant Kabir Praakat Diwas (ਸੰਤ ਕਬੀਰ ਪ੍ਰਾਕਟ ਦਿਵਸ) - The birth anniversary of the famed Sant Kabir who is known all over India for his spiritual poetry and his teachings of unity and transcending religious boundaries.

== See also ==
Punjabi calendar
