= Joti Jot =

Sikh term referring to the physical death of a person

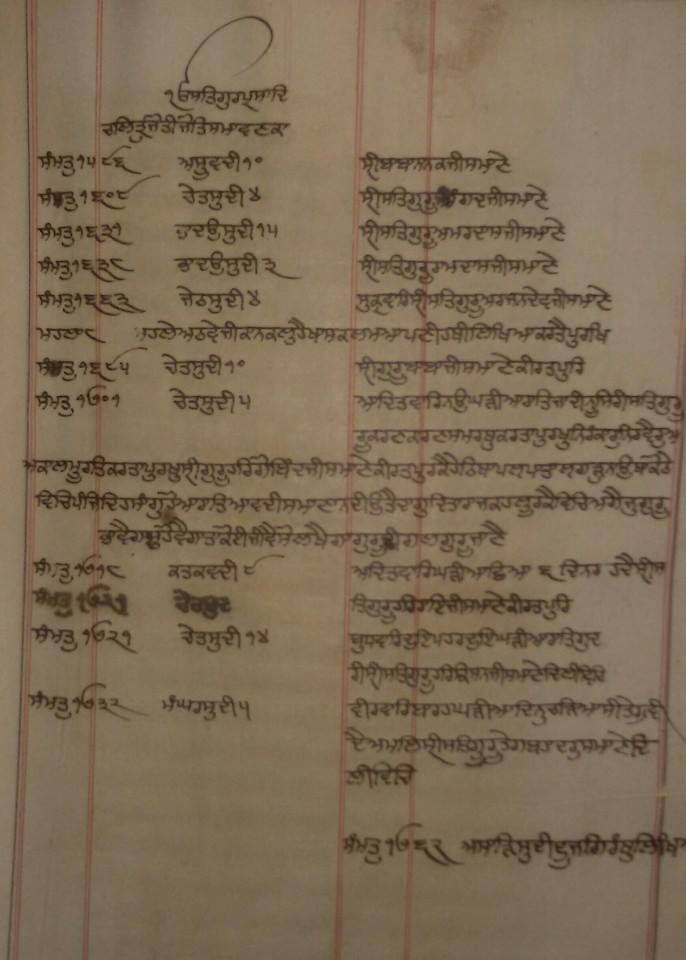
Page from a Guru Granth Sahib manuscript dated to 1705 giving dates of Joti Jot (death) of the Sikh gurus from Guru Nanak to Guru Tegh Bahadur

Joti Jot (Punjabi: ਜੋਤੀ ਜੋਤ; meaning: immersed in the Eternal Light), alternatively transliterated as Jyoti Jot, is a phrase used in Sikhism to describe the physical passing (death) of the Sikh gurus and other spiritually liberated (mukt) individuals. The Sikh gurus and the Sikh scriptures teach that if someone is immortal (or attained immortality during the course of their life, known as jeevan mukt), when they leave this existence they have not died but rather they have rejoined with God, as someone who is an immortal cannot die. This special condition is given the word Joti Jot.

== See also ==
- Gurpurab
- Guru Gaddi
- Martyrdom in Sikhism
