= Karahe Wala =

- Village
- Location in Punjab, India Karahe Wala (India)
- Coordinates: 31.053810°N 75.064901°E
- Country: India

Area
  - Total: 4.54 km^{2} (1.75 sq mi)

Population (2011)
  - Total: 949
  - Density: 209/km^{2} (541/sq mi)

Languages
- Time zone: UTC+5:30 (IST)
- 142044: 142044
- Vehicle registration: PB 76

Karahe Wala is a small village in Moga district of Punjab state of India.

Karahe Wala is a village in Kot-ise-khan tehsil in the Moga District of Punjab State, India. It is located 33 km north of district headquarters Moga and 185 km from the state capital Chandigarh. Moga, Zira, and Makhu are the nearby cities.

== Geography ==
Karahe Wala is on the border of the Moga and Firozepur district. Firozepur District Zira is toward the west.

== Demographics ==
As per 2011 Census of India, total population of Karahe Wala was 949 persons. Total number of households in village was 180 as per 2011 census. There were total of 501 male persons and 448 females and a total number of 87 children of 6 years or below in this village.

== Climate ==
Agricultural fields of Punjab in Monsoon Karahe Wala's climate is characterised by extreme hot and extreme cold conditions. Annual temperatures in Punjab range from 1 to 46 °C (34 to 115 °F) but can reach 49 °C (120 °F) in summer and 0 °C (32 °F) in winter. The northeast area lying near the foothills of the Himalayas receives heavy rainfall, whereas the area lying further south and west receives less rainfall and experiences higher temperatures. Average annual rainfall ranges 460 millimetres (18 inches) in the plains.

Karahe Wala has three seasons: summer (April to June), when temperatures typically rise as high as 38 °C (100 °F); monsoon season (July to September), when the majority of rainfall occurs; and winter (December to February), when temperatures typically fall as low as 0 °C (32 °F).

== Transportation ==
Main articles: Punjab Roadways and PEPSU Road Transport Corporation

Public transportation in the village is provided by buses. The main bus stand is 500 m away on the national highway.

== Economy ==
Karahe Wala is one of the most fertile regions in Punjab. The region is ideal for wheat growing. Rice, maize, fruits and vegetables are also grown.

== Politics ==
S. Ajaypal Singh Sandhu is the current sarpanch of village Karahe Wala.

== Religion ==
Sikhism is the predominant faith in village, followed by more than 90% of the populace. There are one. gurudwara situated in the village.

== Language ==
The Punjabi language, written in the Gurmukhi script, is the official language of the village. Punjabi is the ninth most spoken language in the world and fourth most spoken language in Asia.

== Education ==
There are two primary and secondary schools in the village. There are also a number of private school around the village.

== Culture ==
The culture of village has many elements including music such as bhangra, an extensive religious and non-religious dance tradition, a long history of poetry in the Punjabi language, and harvest festivals such as Lohri, Basant, Vaisakhi and Teeyan, all of which are celebrated in addition to the religious festivals of India.

== Cuisine ==
One of the main features of village cuisine is its diverse range of dishes. Some food items are eaten on a daily basis while some delicacies are cooked only on special occasions.
