= Khohari =

Khohari khori
- village
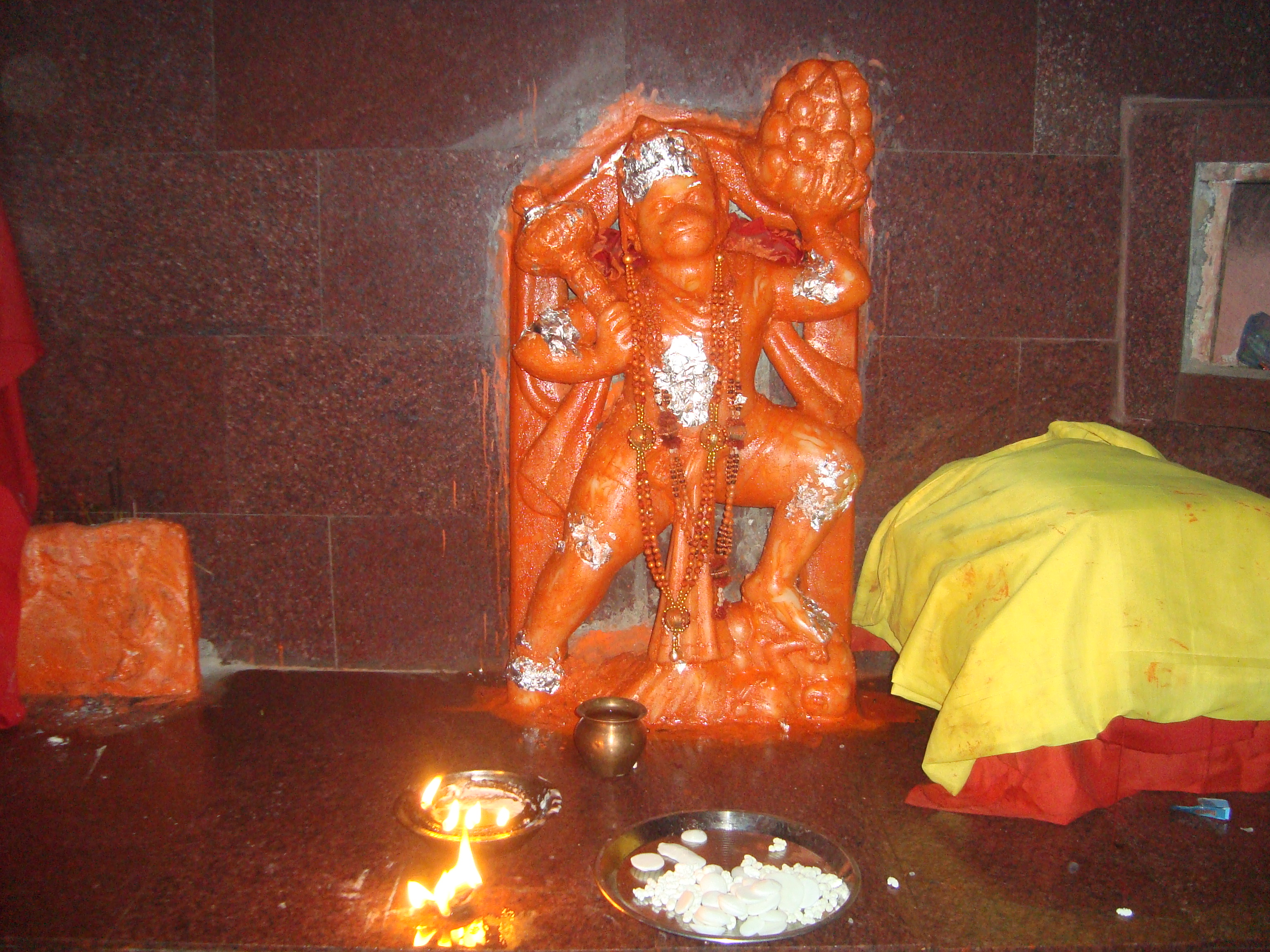
- Khohari hanuman temple

- Location in Rajasthan, India Khohari (India)
- Coordinates: 27°54′47″N 76°13′38″E
- Country: India
- State: Rajasthan
- District: Alwar

Population
  - Total: 2,500

Languages
  - Official: Hindi
- Time zone: UTC+5:30 (IST)
- ISO 3166 code: RJ-IN
- Nearest city: Behror

Khohari is a village in the Behror tehsil the Kotputli-behror district of Rajasthan state in India, with a population of around 5500.

== History ==
There is no clear evidence but it is believed that khohari was founded about 1850. The village was first founded in the valley of the Aravalli Range and was later established 1 km to the east of the Aravalli Range.

== Culture ==
Due to its location, the village culture has been influenced by Haryana. Rath is the main spoken language. Khohari is a village of 100% Hindu population, hence the culture involves all Hindu festivals and rituals. Holi, Deepawali, Gangaur, and Raksha Bandhan are the major festivals. The village has two temples, to Hanuman and to Shiva.

== Economy ==
Formerly, the economy of Khohari was based mainly on agriculture and government employment, predominantly in teaching, the army and the police services, but this has lately been undergoing a change because of the poor financial prospects in agriculture and greater awareness of the importance of education. The village has all basic facilities, including one private school and two government schools for education up to the class of ten; a post office and a water supply system.

== Education ==
In the past, education was lacking, but is now the top priority of the villagers.
