= Teej =

Special festivals of Hindu women

Tīja
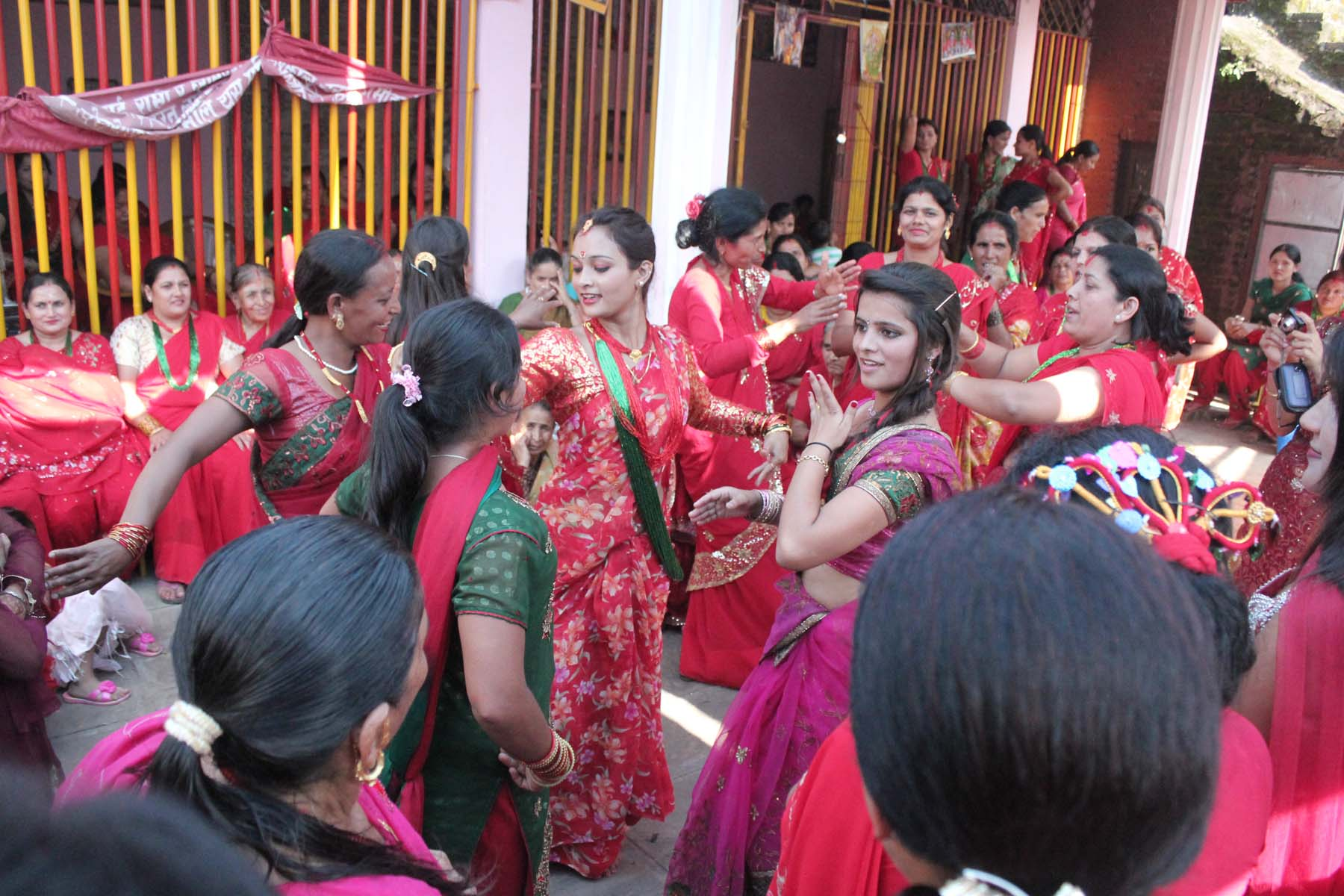
- Women celebrating Teej in Nepal
- Observed by: Hindu women
- Liturgical color: Red
- Type: Hindu
- Significance: Signifies the penance made by goddess Parvati to receive Shiva as her husband
- Celebrations: Day 1 : enjoying a grand feast, Day 2: observing a day-long fasting, with praying, dancing and visiting Shiva temples Day 3: Taking a holy bath and performing Rishi Panchami
- Date: July–September
- Frequency: Annual

Two Lambada young men speak in Lambani, discussing Teej, Seethla/Ghargharer festivals

Teej (Sanskrit: तीज, meaning "third") is a collective term for three Hindu festivals dedicated to the goddess Parvati and her consort Shiva. It is mainly celebrated by married women and unmarried girls, to pray for the long life of their husband or future husband and to welcome the arrival of the monsoon through singing, swinging, dancing, joyous celebration, pūjā, and often fasting.

Tīja collectively refers to three festivals: Haryālī Tīja, Kajari Tīja, and Hartālikā Tīja. Haryālī Tīja (lit. 'green Tīja'), also known as Sindhārā Tīja, Chhoṭī Tīja, Śrāvaṇa Tīja, or Sāvana Tīja, falls on the third day after the new moon in the month of Śrāvaṇa. It marks the day when Śiva consented to Pārvatī’s wish to marry him. Women visit their parental homes, prepare swings, and celebrate with song and dance.

Kajari Tīja (lit. 'dark Tīja'), also known as Baṛī Tīja, is celebrated 15 days after Haryālī Tīja during the dark (waning) phase of the moon.

Hartālikā Tīja (from Harat meaning "abduction" and Ālikā meaning "female friend") falls one lunar month after Haryālī Tīja on the third day after the new moon in the month of Bhādrapada. It commemorates the occasion when Pārvatī encouraged her friends to abduct her to avoid marriage with Viṣṇu, which her father Himālaya had arranged. Married women observe nirjala vrata (a fast without water) on this day for the well-being of their husbands.

== Etymology ==
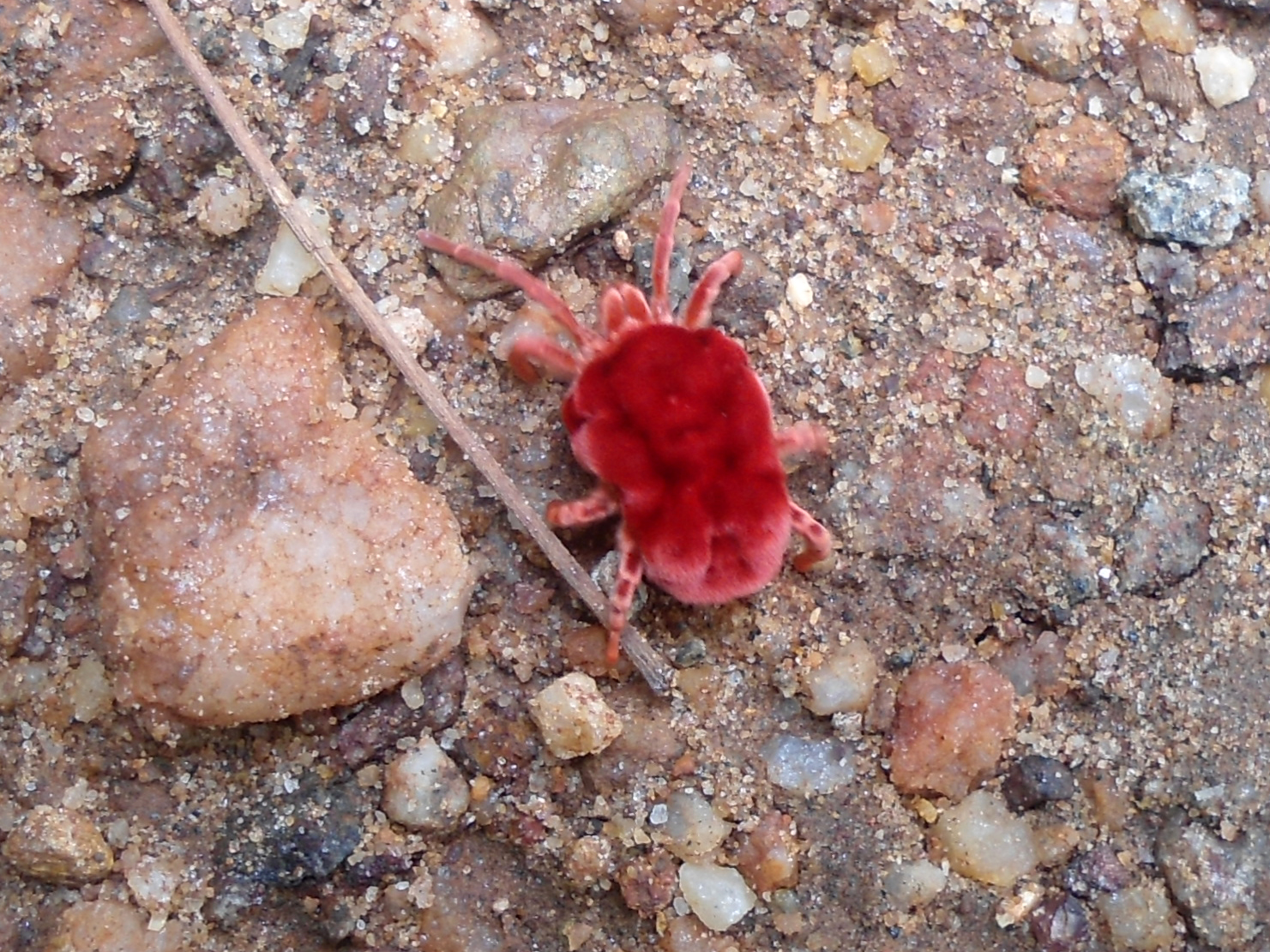
Red velvet mite (Trombidium), also called Teej, appears during the monsoon season.

Teej refers to the third day that falls every month after the new moon (amavasya), and the third day after the full moon night of every lunar month. According to Kumar (1988), Kajari Teej and Hartalika Teej fall in Bhadrapada.

The festivals celebrate the bounty of nature, arrival of clouds and rain, greenery and birds with social activity, rituals, and customs. The festivals for women, include dancing, singing, getting together with friends and telling stories, dressing up with henna-coloured hands and feet, wearing red, green or orange clothes, sharing festive foods, and playing under trees on swings on Haryali Teej. The monsoon festival in Rajasthan is dedicated to Parvati.

== Haryali Teej ==
Haryali Teej (lit. Green Teej) is celebrated on the third day after the new moon in the month of Shraavana/Sawan (of the Hindu calendar). As Shraavana falls during the monsoon or rainy season when the surroundings become green, the Shraavana Teej is also called Hariyali Teej.

The Hariyali Teej festival is also celebrated to remember the day when Shiva accepted Parvati as his wife. Parvati fasted and was austere for many years and was accepted by Shiva as his wife in her 108th birth. Parvati is also known as Teej mata (lit. Teej mother).

=== Sindhara ===
On Teej married daughters receive the gifts by her mother such clothes, bangles, bindi, mehandi, etc. Ghevar, a special sweet, are given to them on this day. These gifts are known as Sindhara. According to Bhatnager (1988), Sindhara is derived from the Sanskrit word sringar which means "decoration of women and their charming beauty".

=== Observance of Haryali Teej ===
Haryali Teej is celebrated in Punjab, Haryana, Western UP and Rajasthan. The festival is also celebrated in Chandigarh.

==== Chandigarh ====
Chandigarh administration makes special arrangements for Teej celebration in the Rock Garden in the city. School children present plays and other cultural programs on this day. The female members of the family, especially daughters, are given gifts and dresses.

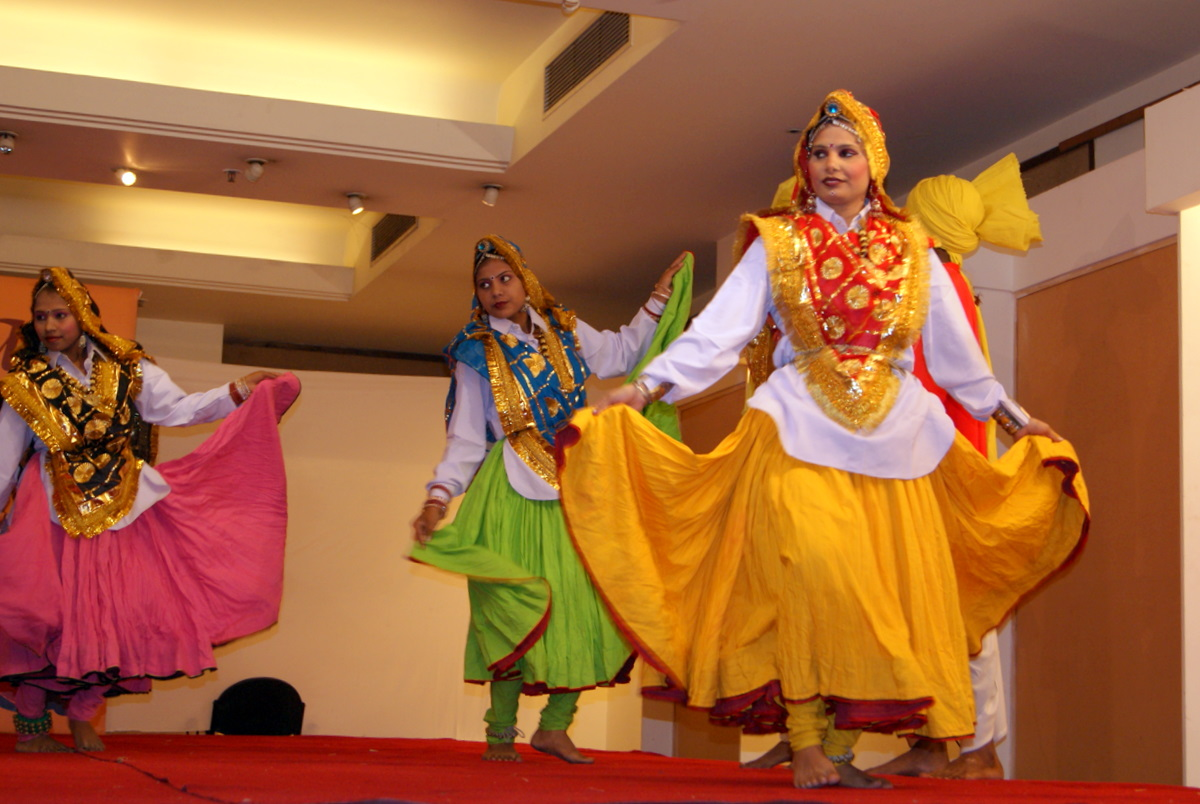
Haryali Teej Performance

==== Haryana ====
Haryali Teej is one of the famous festivals of Haryana, and is celebrated as an official holiday. Many functions are organised by the Government of Haryana to celebrate this festival, which welcomes the rainy season. Boys traditionally flew kites from morning to evening, though this tradition is losing its charm in big cities due to high rise buildings and lack of terrace space.

Swings are set up in open courtyards, under trees for the season. Girls apply henna to their hands and feet and are excused from household chores on this day. On Teej, girls often receive new clothes from their parents.

On Teej, just as on Karva Chauth, the mother sends a baya or gift. The puja is performed in the morning. The baya, which consists of a variety of foodstuffs, is placed on a thaali at a place of worship where a chowk (square) has been decorated, and an idol or picture of Parvati has been installed. The evenings are set aside for folk singing and dancing, including the women's prayers for their husbands' longevity and their families.

==== Punjab ====
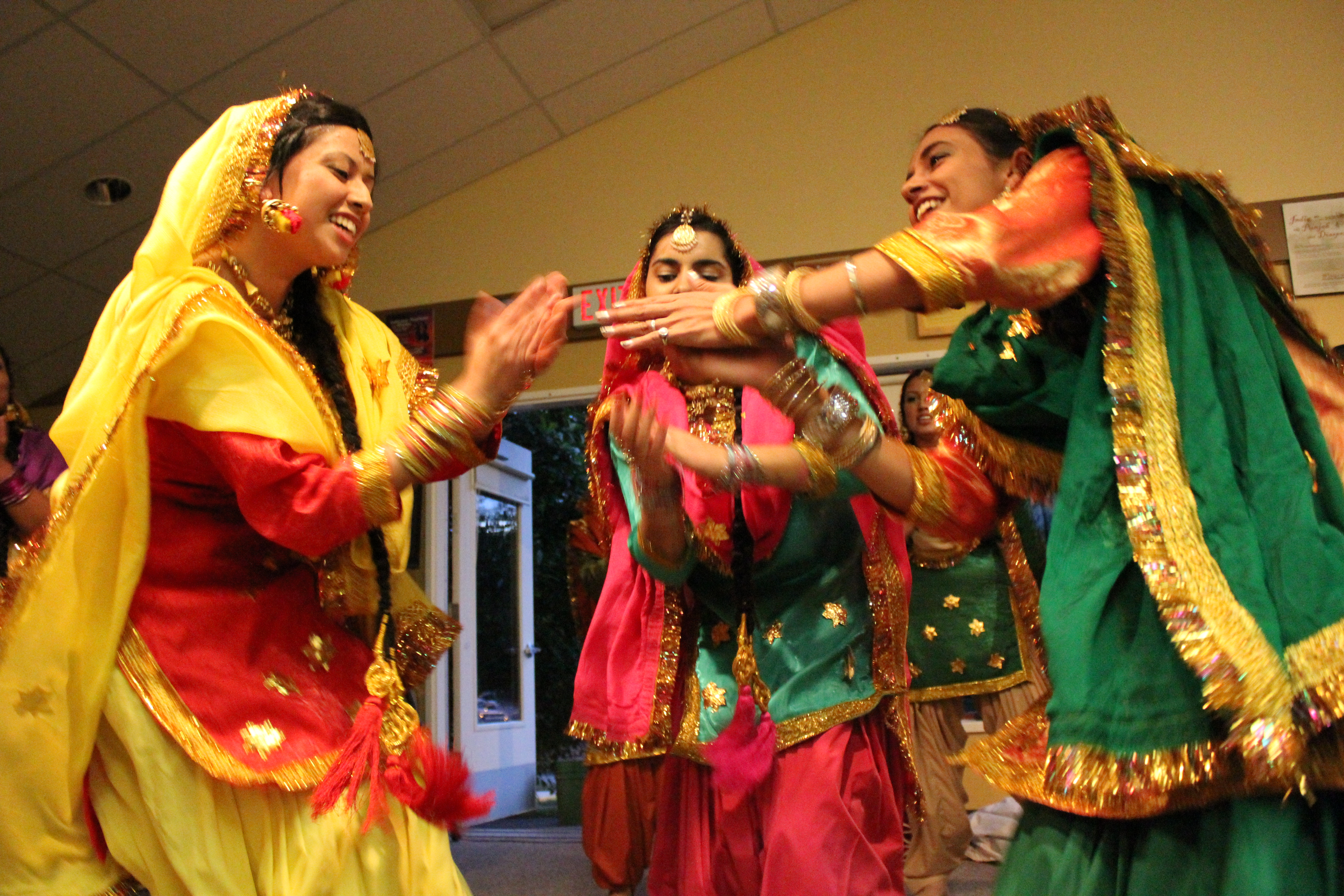
A dance during Teeyan.

Teej is known as Teeyan in Punjab and is seen as a seasonal festival which is dedicated to the onset of the monsoon. The festival is celebrated by women of all faiths, and lasts from the third day of the bright half of the lunar month of Sawan as per the Bikrami calendar (Punjabi calendar) to the full moon of Sawan (about 13 days). Teeyan involves women getting together and performing Gidda, married women visiting their families and receiving gifts. It is also traditional for women to ride on swings.

Fairs are organised in schools and colleges where dance competitions are held.

Teeyan is a festival when girls play on swings that are set up under trees or open courtyards. During Teeyan, family members give gifts, typically new clothes and accessories, to girls and women. Sweets are prepared especially Ghevar in some parts of Punjab.

==== Rajasthan ====
Teej welcomes the monsoon and observed in the month of Shravan (July/August). The monsoon rains fall on the parched land and the pleasing scent of the wet soil rises into the air. Swings are hung from trees and women dressed in green clothes sing songs in celebration of the advent of the monsoon.

This festival is dedicated to Parvati, commemorating her union with Shiva. Parvati is worshipped by seekers of conjugal bliss and happiness. An elaborate procession is taken out in Jaipur for two continuous days on the festive occasion which is watched by people in large numbers. The Teej idol is covered with a canopy whereas the Gangaur idol is open. The traditional Ghevar sweet is also associated with the festival.

During Teej, Parvati is worshiped. The day before Haryali Teej, is celebrated as Sinjara, wherein women put mehndi on their hands and feet.

== Kajari Teej ==
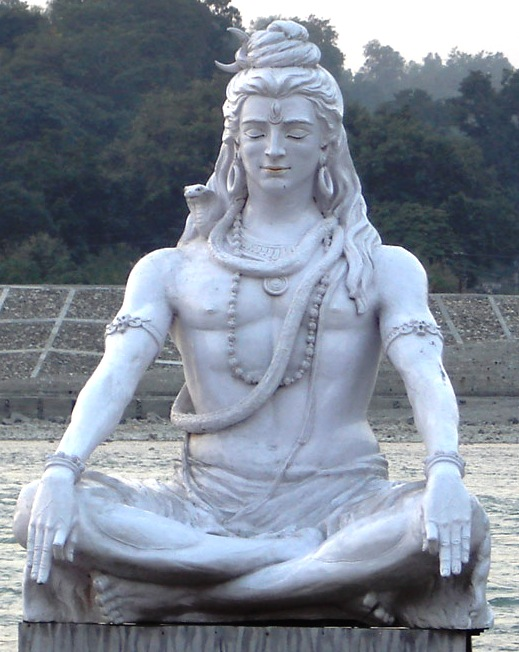
Statue of Shiva in Rishikesh.

Kajari Teej is celebrated in the Bikrami lunar month of Bhadrapada: the third day of the dark fortnight of Bhadrapada. Kajari Teej is also called Boorhi Teej. In Rajasthan, Kajari Teej is called Badi Teej (lit. Bigger Teej) as it follows Haryali Teej, which is known as Chhoti Teej (lit. Smaller Teej).

Women in Bhojpuri region of Uttar Pradesh pray to Shiva on Kajari Teej. It is also customary to sing folk songs known as kajris. The focus of the lyrics is usually on separation expressing the pining of a woman for her beloved in her parents' home, where she has been sent to celebrate Teej, or waiting in anticipation to be collected by brothers to celebrate Teej. The Kajari is a folk song composed and sung in the Bhojpuri region of Uttar Pradesh, Bihar, Jharkhand and the Terai region of Nepal.

Women who observe the Kajari Teej fast go without food and water. Kajari Teej is associated closely with Kajali Teej, which also involves praying to the moon. The fast is broken by eating sattu. The other focus of the day is to pray to the neem tree. A fair named Kajali Teej Mela is held in Bundi in Rajasthan to celebrate Kajari Teej.

== Hartalika Teej ==
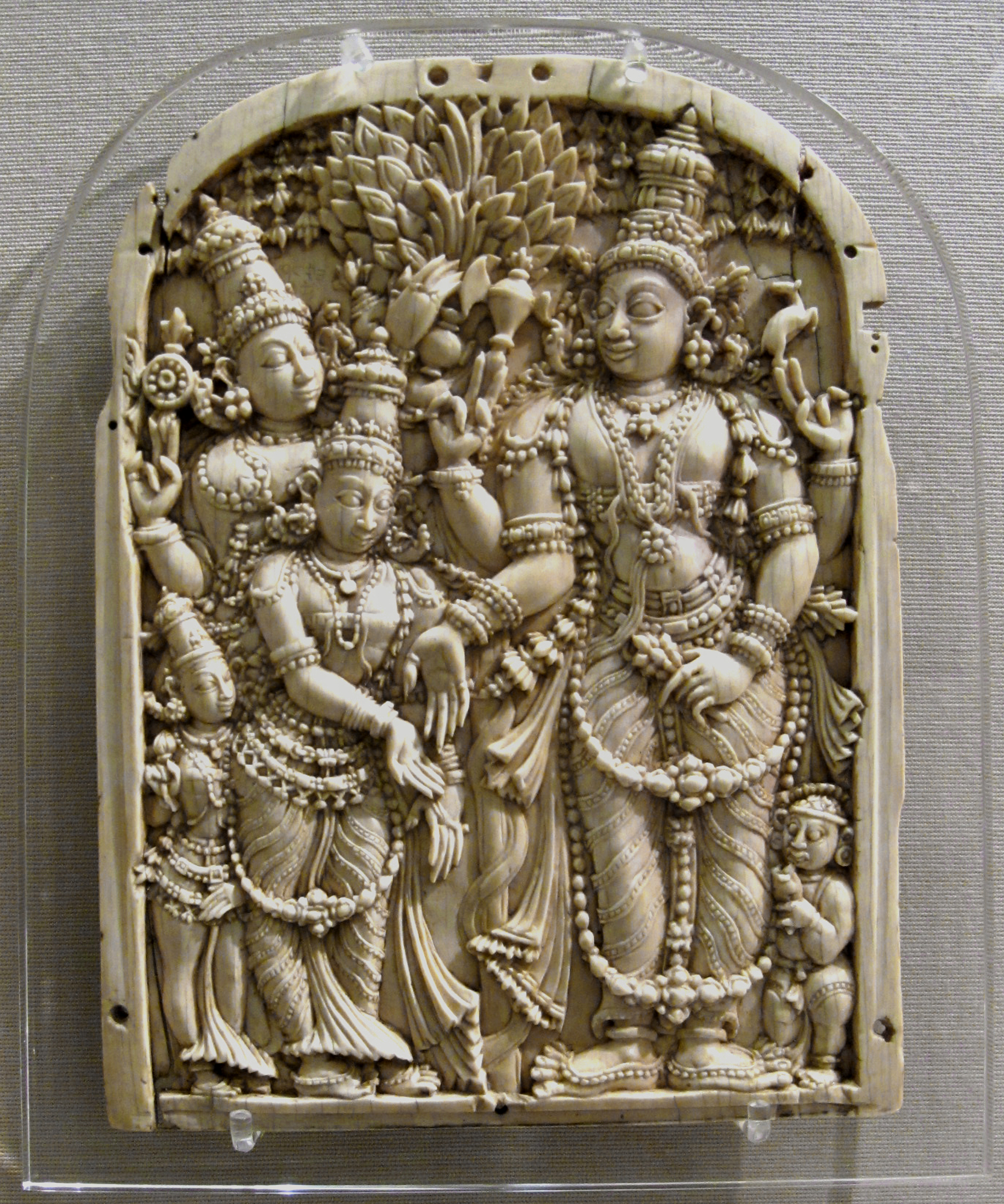
The wedding of Shiva and Parvati. Collection of the Victoria and Albert Museum.

Hartalika is a combination of the Sanskrit words harit and aalika which means "abduction" and "female friend" respectively. According to the legend of Hartalika Teej, Parvati, incarnated as Shailaputri

On the third day of the bright half of Bhadrapada, Parvati made a shiva lingam out of sand and silt of Ganga and prayed. Shiva was so impressed that he gave his word to marry Parvati. Eventually, Parvati was united with Shiva and was married to him with her father's blessing. Since then, the day is referred to as Hartalika Teej as Parvati's female (aalika) friend had to abduct (harit) her in order for the goddess to achieve her goal of marrying Shiva.

Accordingly, Hartalika Teej is seen as a major festival and is celebrated on the third day of the bright half of the Indian/North Nepali Lunar month of Bhadrapada. The festival women feasting during the evening of Hartalika Teej, praying to Parvati and Shiva, remembering their wedding and staying up all night listening to prayers. The fast (also called nishivasar nirjala vrat) commences during the evening of Hartalika Teej and is broken the next day after a full day's observance which involves women not even drinking water. The focus is on praying to Parvati whom Shiva desired should be worshipped under the name Hartalika. The main areas of celebration are Bihar, eastern Uttar Pradesh, Jharkhand, Rajasthan, Uttarakhand and Nepal. In Rajasthan, an idol of Parvati is taken out in procession in the streets accompanied by singing, and music. Hartalika Teej has also spread to parts of Madhya Pradesh, Chhattisgarh .

In Maharashtra Hartalika teej also known as Hartalika tritiya vrat, which is celebrated in similar manner like northern India. It is observed by married women for the welfare, health, and long life of their husbands and for a happy married life and unmarried girls for being blessed with a good husband. It is Nirjala Vrat, they fast for one and half day. Women do Sola shrungar, apply mehndi, wear new red or green sari, observe fast, make idol of Shiva, Gauri, Sakhi and Ganesha with clay or river sand, read katha. They do bhajan sangeet pooja in night as well and open vrat on the second day. It is very auspicious vrat for women in India to worship goddess Parvati in the form of Gauri along with Shiva parivar.

In eastern Uttar Pradesh, Bihar and Jharkhand, married women keep Nirjala Upvas for the whole day of Teej, & deck up with Shringaars like Aalta, Mehndi, e.t.c.. In the evening, the women get decked up in heavy sarees, gold jewellery,their wedding Chunris, & don the traditional orange Sindoor from the tip of their nose. In many homes, it is a tradition to wear their wedding Banarasi Saree, on the eve of Teej. They make & worship small clay idols of Shiva, Gauri, Ganesh & Kartikeya. They offer flowers, garlands, Fruits, sweets & items of 16 Shringaar to Maa parvati. Then they recite & listen to the Hartālikā Teej Katha,& offer reverence to the deities. Very early in the next morning,before sunrise, the women get ready & worship the idols again & finally conclude their fasts. The idols are later immersed in a holy water body. In Bhojpuri region, traditional delicacies such as Thekua, Pidukia, e.t.c. are prepared for offering. Traditional folk songs are sung, & women adorn Sindoor from their wedding Sinhora.

== Elsewhere in India ==
=== Akha Teej ===
Akha Teej (also called Akshaya Tritiya) falls on the third day after full moon in the month of Vaisakha. It is an auspicious day of the birthday of Parashurama, the sixth incarnation of Vishnu. On this day, Vyasa and Ganesha began to write the Mahabharata. Jains celebrate this day to commemorate Tirthankara Rishabha's ending of his fast by consuming sugarcane juice poured into his cupped hands. According to Gagne (2013), Akha Teej is an important festival in the Hindu calendar.

=== Awra Teej of Madhya Pradesh and Chhattisgarh ===
Awra Teej is celebrated in the month of Vaisakh in parts of Madhya Pradesh and Chhattisgarh. This festival of Teej falls in Spring. The month of Vaisakh occurs during spring.

=== Jhulan Utsav ===
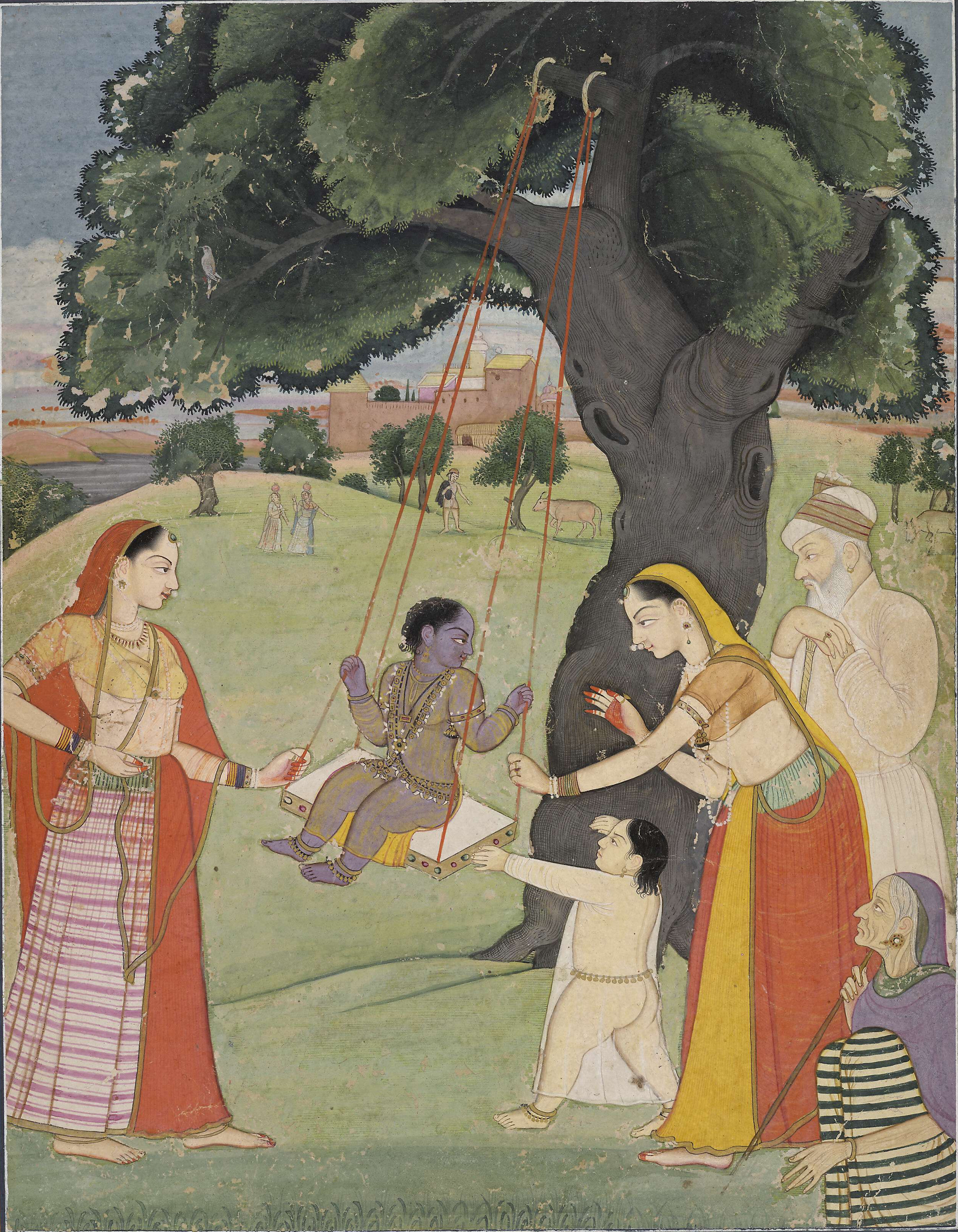
Krishna on a swing (jhula), ca. 1755. Collection of the British Museum.

Haryali Teej coihojpudi regiones with the swing festival of Jhulan Leela also known us Jhulan Utsav or Hindola Utsav which is associated with Krishna and Radha, and is celebrated at Banke Bihari Temple and other temples in the Vrindavan area of Uttar Pradesh. The festival lasts until Krishna Janmashtami for 13 days.

On the day of Teej, idols of Krishna and Radha are placed on swings in the temples and the focus of Jhulan Leela is religious. The green theme, popular in neighbouring Rajasthan and Haryana on Haryali Teej, can also be seen in the Jhulan Utsav. Idols of Krishna and Radha are dressed in green clothes.

Haryali Teej and Jhulan Utsav fall on the same day, but the Teej is a monsoon festival dedicated to Parvati whereas, Jhulan Utsav is dedicated to Krishna and Radha.

=== Kajal Teej of Telangana ===
Teej in Telangana forms part of a wider celebration which is a forerunner to other festivals being celebrated and is known as Kajal Teej. Kajal Teej is one of the Banjara tribe's biggest festivals.

=== Kevada Teej of Gujarat ===
Kevada Teej, also known as Kevda Trij, is a festival observed mainly in Gujarat. The festival is celebrated on the third day of the Shukla Paksha (waxing of the moon) of Bhadra in Gujarat. This observance is similar to the Hartalika Teej fast (vrat). Married and unmarried women observe a fast on the day and offer the kevada flower (pine screw) to Parvati and Shiva.

== Haritalika Teej observance in Nepal ==
Dedicated to Parvati, commemorating her union with Shiva, the festival is celebrated for well-being of spouse and children and purification of one's body and soul. The festival is a three-day-long celebration that combines sumptuous feasts as well as rigid fasting. Teej (also romanised Tij) is celebrated by women, for the long life of her husband and long and firm relationship between them in this life and all the lives to come. It is particularly celebrated by women from various ethnicities and castes of Nepalese society, particularly the Bhojpuriyas, Maithils (Native Madheshis), Bahun, Chettri, Newairs and Kiratis, on the third day after the new moon of the month of Bhadra (mid-August to mid-September).

=== First day ===
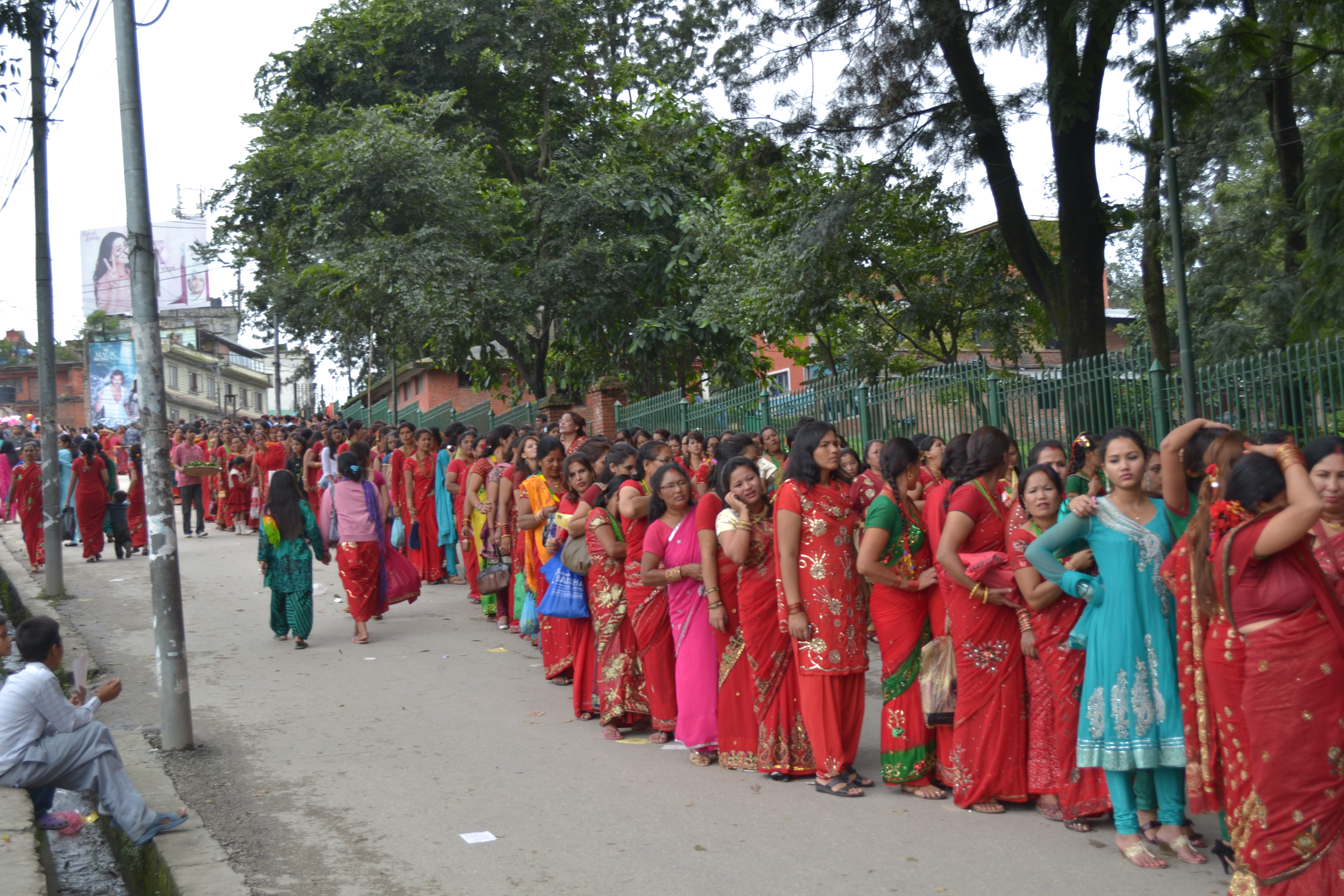
Women line up to making offerings to Parvati and Shiva at Pashupatinath Temple

The first day of Teej is called Dar Khane Din. On this day the women assemble at one place in their finest attire and start dancing and singing devotional songs. Amidst all this, the grand feast takes place. The feast is hosted by men as usual. Women, who work hard throughout the year, do not have to do anything that day. That is the day for them to embellish themselves in sorha singaar — dressing up and using make up to the full extent, indulge in good food, and dance. Oftentimes, because women are invited by multiple brothers for the feast, they try to dance off some food before they are ready to eat more. The food served is supposed to be rich and abundant.

This is probably the only day in a year that allows women full freedom of expression. Consequently, women have traditionally used this occasion to express their pains and pang in the songs they sing while dancing. With the advancement of communication and awareness, women these days use this occasion to voice their concerns about social issues and discrimination against women. The jollity often goes on until midnight, after which the 24-hour fast starts.

=== Second day ===
The second day is the day of fasting. Some women don't eat or drink food and water while others drink liquids and eat fruit. The fasting is observed by married and unmarried women. Married women abstain strictly from food and drinks with a belief that their devotion to the gods will be blessed with longevity, peace and prosperity of their husband and family. Unmarried women observe the fast with a hope of being blessed with a good husband.

They dress gaily and visit a nearby Shiva temple singing and dancing on the way. The Pashupatinath Temple gets the highest number of devotees. At the temple, women circumambulate the shiva lingam, which symbolizes Shiva. The main pooja (religious ceremony) takes place with offerings of flowers, fruits, etc., made to Shiva and his wife Parvati, beseeching them to grant their blessing upon the husband and family. The important part of the puja is the oil lamp which should be alight throughout the night. It is believed that by the light of an oil lamp all night will bring peace and prosperity to the husband and family.

=== Third day ===
The third day of the festival is Rishi Panchami. After the completion of the previous day's puja, women pay homage to seven saints or sages, offer prayers to deities, and bathe with red mud found on the roots of the sacred datiwan bush, along with its leaves. The Rishi Panchami revolves around the purity of women. During this festival, which occurs two days after the Teej, the women participate in ritual baths and puja (worship). One of the defining characteristics of the Teej Festival is the songs the women sing. Traditionally, these songs emphasized the subservient role of women in Nepalese society in addition to reinforcing traditional Hindu ideology of gender relations. Within the past few decades, as Nepal and the surrounding area experiences rapid development and modernization, the Teej songs have become more of a critical commentary on gender relations from women's perspectives. These songs "extend the women's thoughts and experiences of hardships from an intimate conversation to a public setting". The Teej songs allow women to effect change in their respective societies by giving them a public voice.

== Sources ==
- Bhatnagar, Manju (1988). "The Monsoon Festival Teej in Rajasthan". Asian Folklore Studies. 47 (1): 63–72. doi:10.2307/1178252. JSTOR 1178252.
- Levy, Robert Isaac; Rājopādhyāya, Kedar Rāj (1990). Mesocosm: Hinduism and the Organization of a Traditional Newar City in Nepal. Berkeley, California: University of California Press. ISBN 0-585-13103-1. OCLC 43476658.
- Skinner, Debra; Holland, Dorothy; Adhikari, G. B. (1994). "The Songs of Tij: A Genre of Critical Commentary for Women in Nepal". Asian Folklore Studies. 53 (2): 259–305. doi:10.2307/1178647. JSTOR 1178647.
