= Ghevar =

Indian dessert

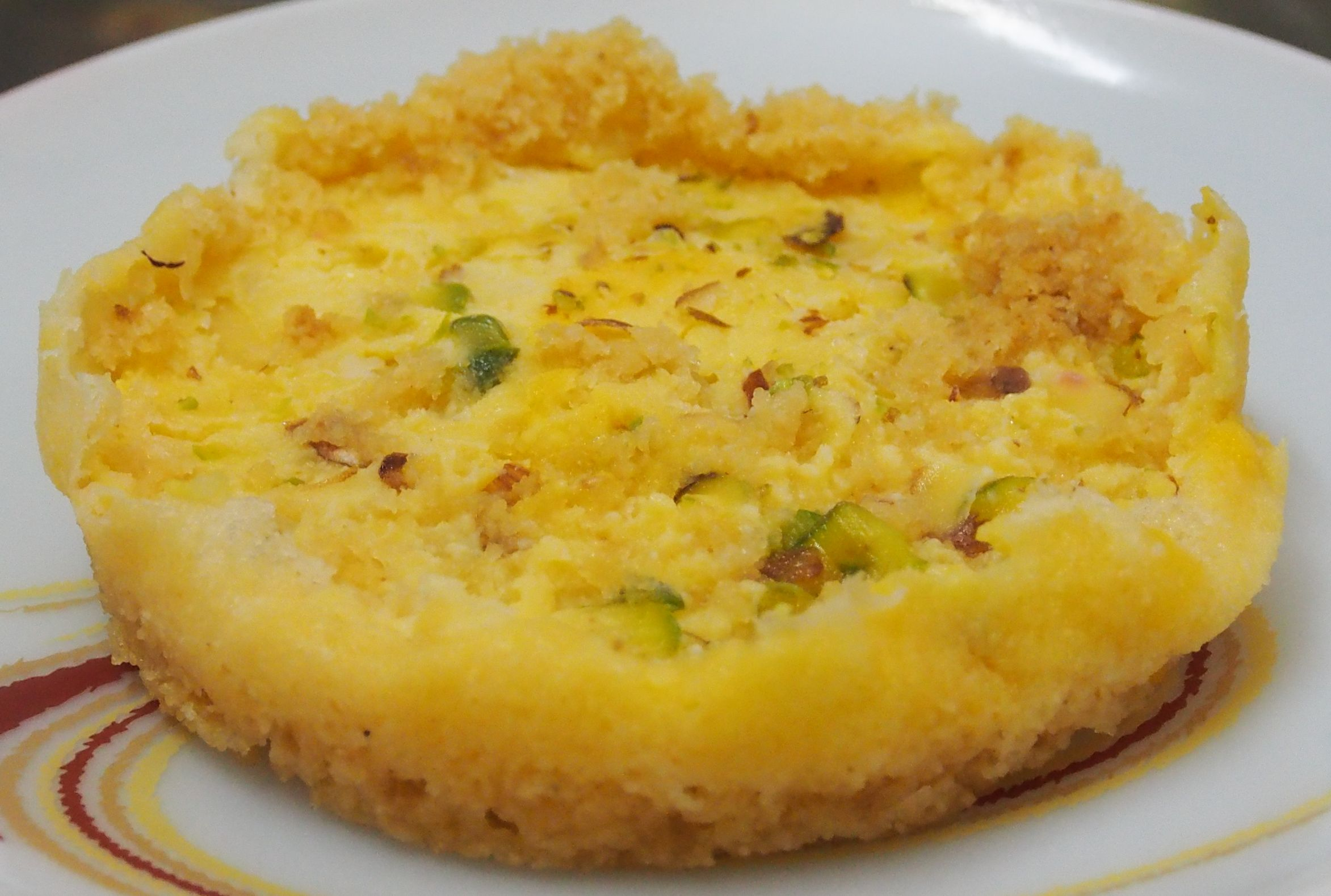
- Ghevar with Malai Topping
- Course: Dessert
- Place of origin: India
- Region or state: Rajasthan
- Main ingredients: Maida, ghee, sugar, milk
- Ingredients generally used: Almonds, pistachio, saffron, green cardamom, kewra
- Variations: Plain Ghevar, Mava Ghevar, Malai Ghevar & Rabdi Ghevar

Ghevar or ghewar is a disc-shaped Rajasthani sweet with a honeycomb-like texture, made from ghee, maida, and sugar syrup. It is traditionally associated with the month of Shraavana and the festivals of Teej and Raksha Bandhan. It is a part of Rajasthani tradition and is gifted to newly married daughter on Sinjara, the day preceding Gangaur and Teej. It is also one of the Chhapan Bhog (56 dishes) served to the Lord Krishna. Besides Rajasthan, it is also famous in the adjoining states of Haryana, Delhi, Gujarat, Uttar Pradesh, and Madhya Pradesh.

Master chef Sanjeev Kapoor is an appreciator of ghevar. Ghevar made its way into the coveted MasterChef Australia when Depinder Chhibber served the sweet in audition round of Season 13.

== Etymology ==
The word "ghevar" is connected to the Sanskrit term "ghṛtapūra" (घृतपूर), which breaks down into "ghṛta" (घृत), meaning "ghee" (clarified butter), and "pūra" (पूर), meaning "filled" or "cake." This term translates to "ghee cake," reflecting the sweet's use of ghee and its cake-like texture. 16th century saint poet Mira Bai, offers Ghevar to Krishna in one of her poems.

== Origin ==
The origin of Ghevar can be traced back to the royal courts of Rajasthan, where chefs crafted this delicacy for the Maharajas, before eventually making its way to the common people of Rajasthan and India.

== Preparation ==
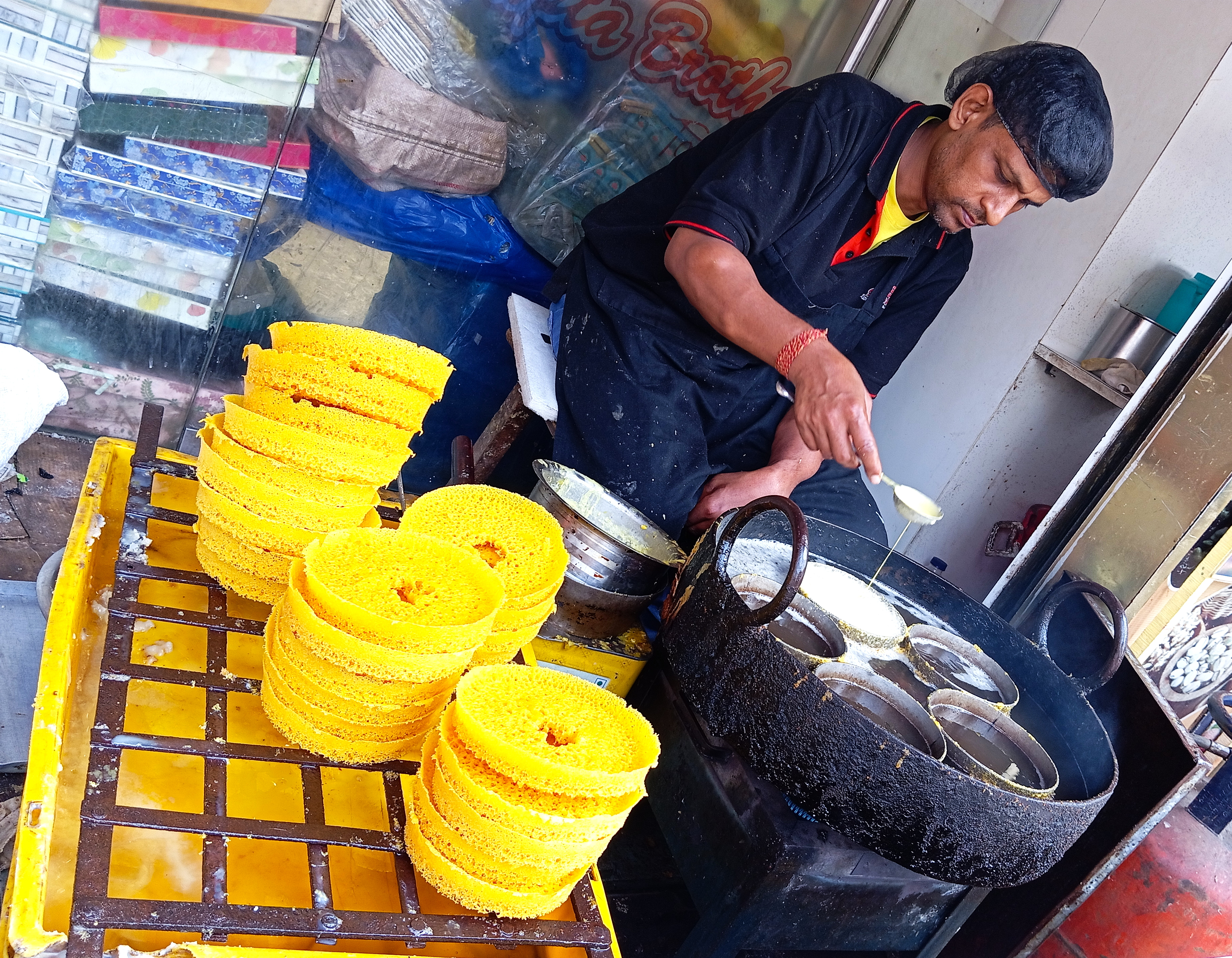
Rajasthani Ghevar Sweet making inside a street stall in Kolkata, India

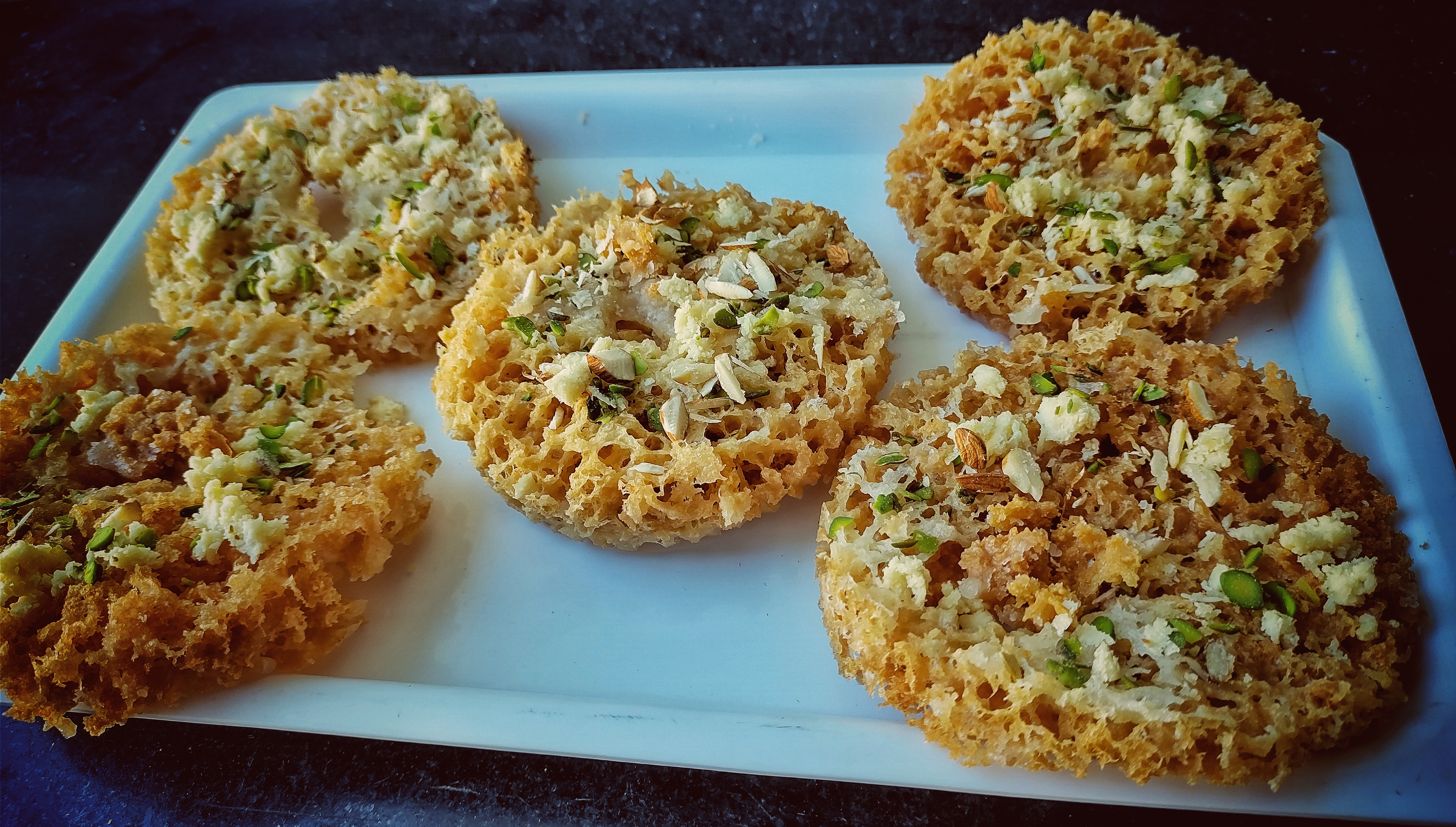

Ghevar is a disc-shaped sweet cake made with flour, ghee (clarified butter), and soaked in sugar syrup. Flour, ghee, milk, and water are mixed to make a batter. The batter is then poured in ghee in disc shape and is fried to a golden honeycomb-like texture. Common toppings include saffron, spices and nuts.

== Variations ==
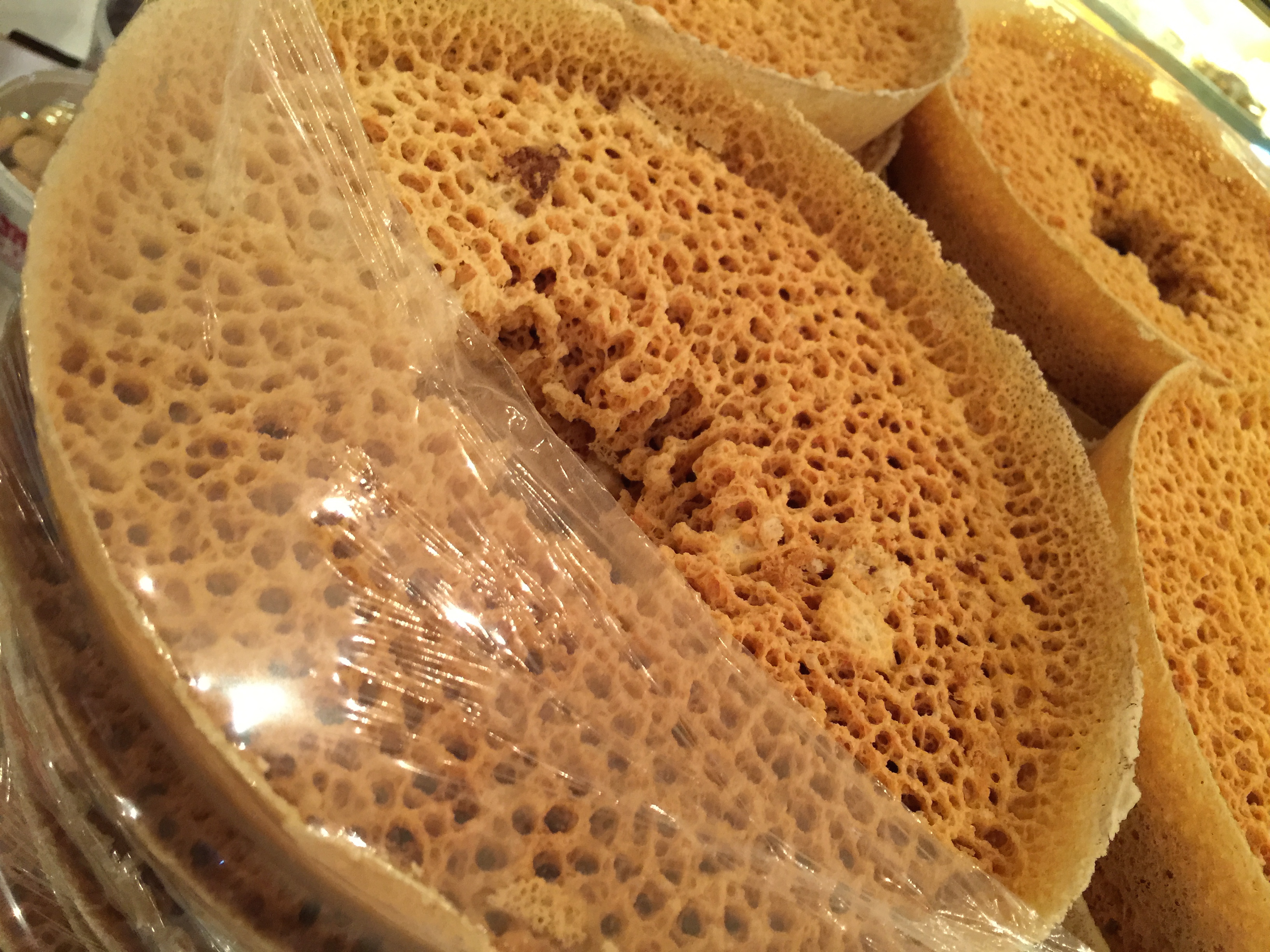
Plain Ghevar

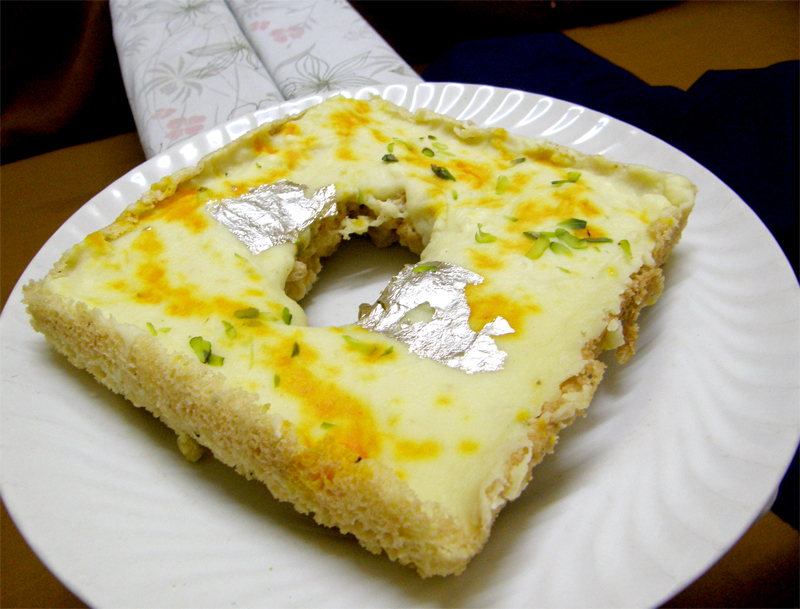
Malai Ghevar

Ghevar comes in multiple varieties, including plain, mawa, and malai ghevar. Jaipur's LMB introduced variations like Chhena Ghevar in 1961. Ghevar can be soaked in sugar-water syrup or is often topped with rabdi. A special variation for weight watchers and diabetics is its sugar free version available nowadays.
