= Gangaur =

Indian festival

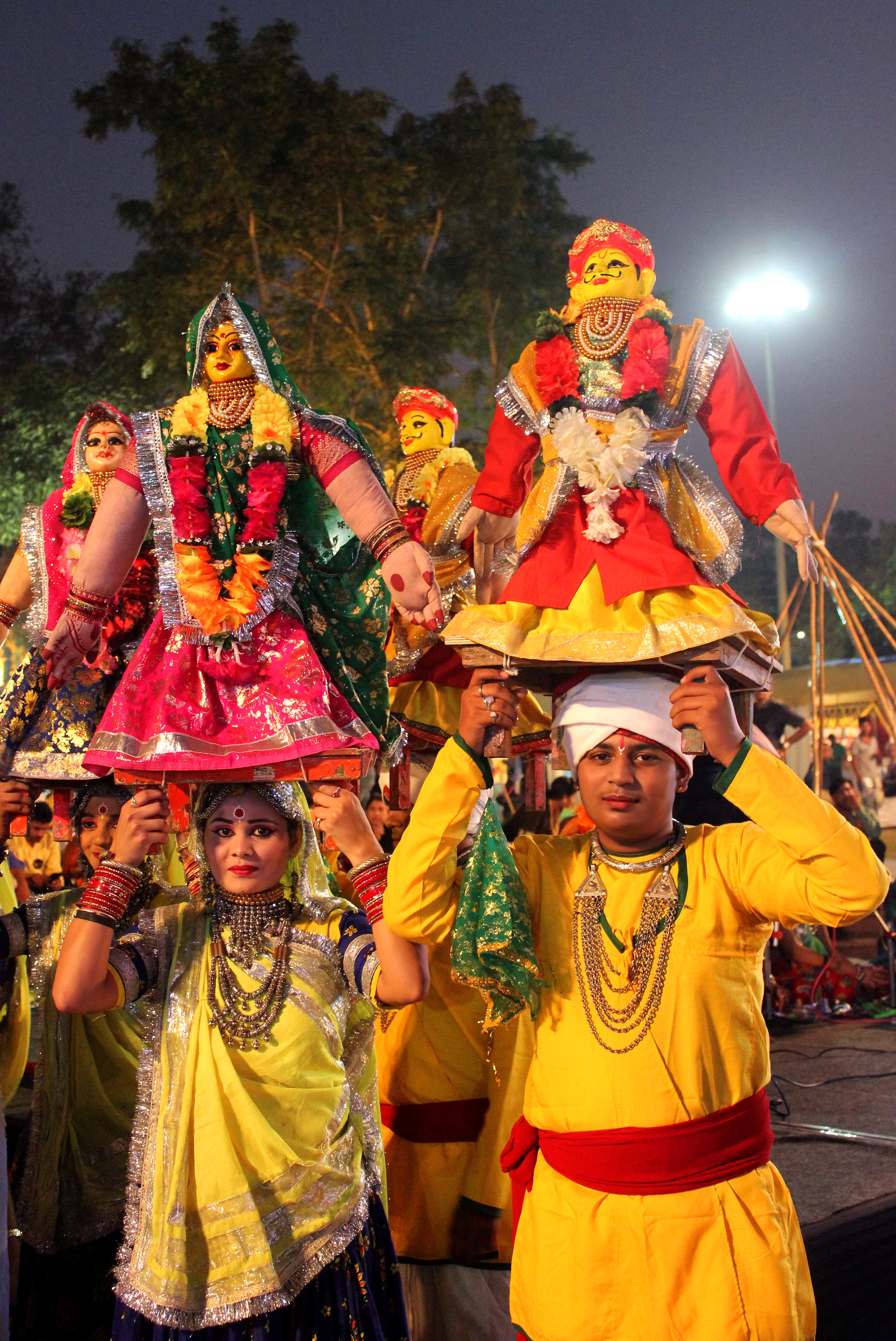
- Dancers worshiping Gangaur
- Observed by: Hindu women of northern and western India
- Type: Religious
- Celebrations: 16 days
- Observances: Worship of the divine couple Shiva and Parvati
- Begins: First day of Chaitra
- Ends: Third day of shukla paksha of Chaitra
- 2024 date: March 25 - April 11
- Duration: 16 days
- Frequency: Annual
- Related to: Karva Chauth; Varalakshmi Vratam

Gangaur (Sanskrit: गणगौर, IAST: Gaṇagaura) is a Hindu festival celebrated in the Indian states of Rajasthan, Haryana, Fazilka District of Punjab, the regions of Malwa, Nimar (Manawar, Barwani, Khargone, Khandwa) of Madhya Pradesh and the Braj and Bundelkhand regions of Uttar Pradesh. It is also celebrated in some parts of Gujarat and West Bengal. A variation of the same festival known as Chaitra Gauri Vrat is observed on the same day in the states of Maharashtra and northern Karnataka. Another variation called Saubhagya Gauri Vratam is observed in the states of Telangana and Andhra Pradesh.

Gangaur is a colourful festival which is one of the most important celebrations of the people of Rajasthan and the Fazilka district of Punjab. It is observed throughout the state with great fervor and devotion by Hindu womenfolk who worship the goddess Gauri (Parvati), the consort of Shiva during the Hindu month of Chaitra (March–April). It is the celebration of spring, harvest, marital fidelity, conjugal blessedness, and childbearing. Unmarried women worship the goddess in hopes of being blessed with a good husband, while married women do so for the welfare, health, and long life of their husbands.

== Etymology ==
Gana is a Sanskrit term that means group, associated with Shiva, while Gauri is an epithet of Parvati.

== Description ==
The festival commences on the first day of Chaitra, the day following Holi, and continues for 16 days. For a newly-wedded girl, it is binding to observe the full course of 18 days of the festival that succeeds her marriage. Unmarried girls fast for the full period of 16 days and eat only one meal a day. The festivities conclude on the third day of the shukla paksha (the first fortnight between the new moon day and the full moon day) of Chaitra. Gangaur melas (fairs) are held throughout the 18-day period. Numerous folklores are associated with Gangaur associated with the regions of Rajasthan, Madhya Pradesh, Haryana, and Gujarat.

Murtis (idols) of Shiva and Parvati are made of clay for the festival. In some families, permanent wooden images are painted afresh every year by reputed painters called matherans on the eve of the festival. A distinct difference between the idols of Teej and Gangaur is that the idol will feature a canopy in the Teej festival while the Gangaur idol does not have a canopy.

Women decorate their hands and feet by drawing designs with mehndi (myrtle paste). The figures drawn range from the Sun, Moon, and the stars to simple flowers or geometrical designs. Ghudlias are earthen pots with numerous holes all around and a lamp lit inside them. On the evening of the 7th day after Holi, unmarried girls go around singing songs of ghudlia carrying the pots with a burning lamp inside, on their heads. On their way, they collect small presents of cash, sweets, jaggery, ghee, oil etc. This continues for 10 days i.e. up to the conclusion of the Gangaur festival when the girls break their pots and throw the debris into the well or a tank and enjoys a feast with the collection made.

The festival reaches its climax during the last three days. The images of Gauri and Isar (Shiva) are dressed in new garments especially made for the occasion. Unmarried girls and married women decorate the images and make them look like living figures.

At an auspicious hour in the afternoon, a procession is taken out to a garden, bawdi, johad, or well with the images of Isar and Gauri, placed on the heads of married women. Songs are sung about the departure of Gauri to her husband's house. The procession comes back after offering water to the first two days. On the final day, the procession concludes with the immersion of all the images into the waters of a tank or a well.

== Legend ==
The story behind the festival (vrata kathā) is narrated as follows:

Once, Shiva, along Parvati and Narada, toured the earth. When they came across a village, the poor women of the settlement, who learnt of their identities, offered whatever water, fruits, and flowers were available to honour the divine couple. Shiva and Parvati were pleased by the devotion of the women. Parvati collected the water in her hand and sprinkled it as nectar upon the women, blessing them with lasting marriages. After their departure, the richer women of the village propitiated the couple, offering them a choice of dishes. Shiva asked his consort how she intended to bless these women, having distributed all her nectar upon the poor women before. Parvati responded that she would offer the rich women with the same fortune as herself, cutting one of her own fingers, sprinkling the blood upon the women before her, which turned into more nectar, blessing them as well. Following this event, Parvati bathed in a nearby river and worshipped Shiva in the form of a lingam, which she created from sand. Propitiated, Shiva appeared before her and proclaimed that all married women who worshipped his consort and he on the third lunar day of the fortnight of Chaitra would be granted a lasting marriage.

== Celebrations ==
=== Jaipur ===
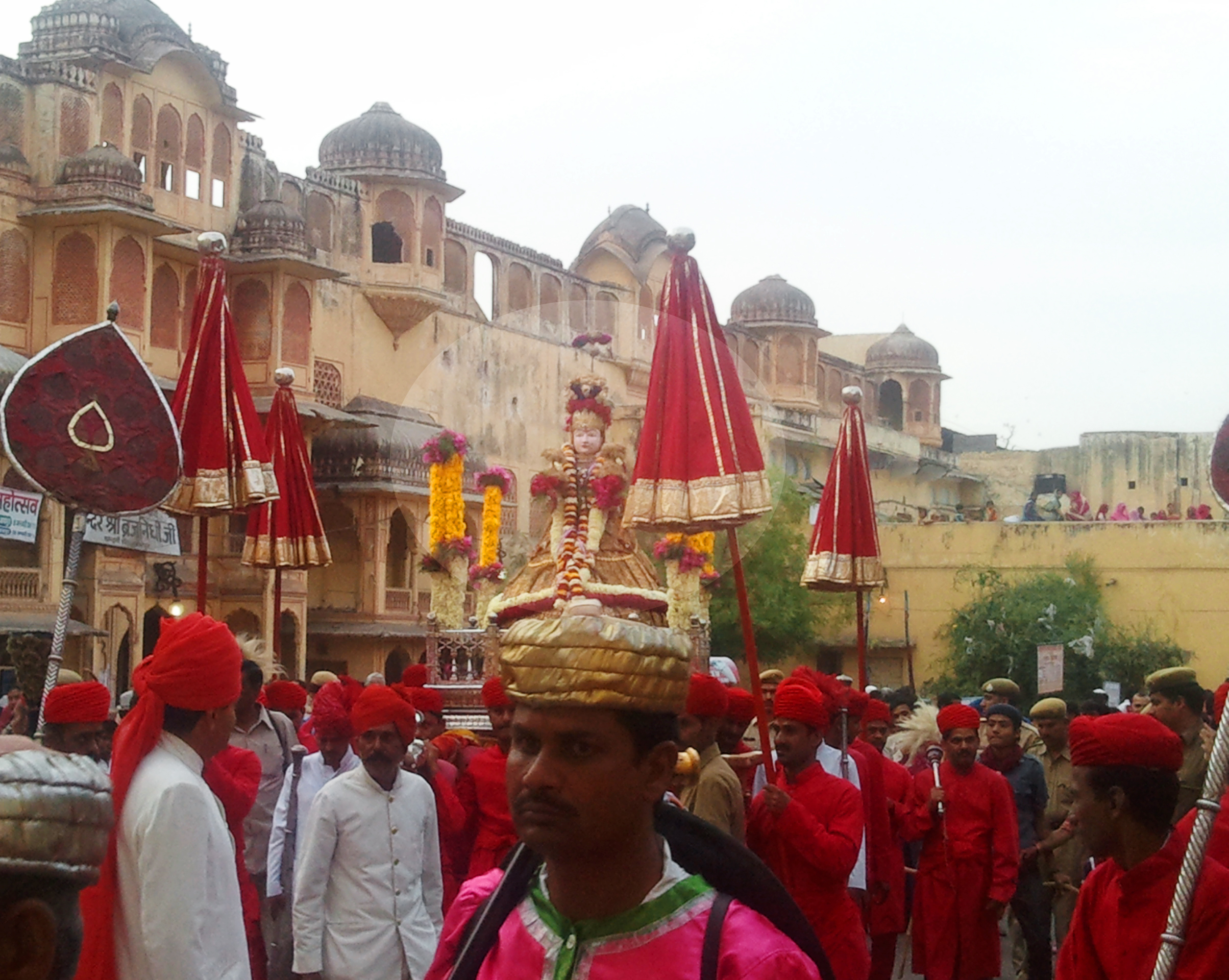
Gauri's procession commencing from the Zanani-Deodhi of the City Palace

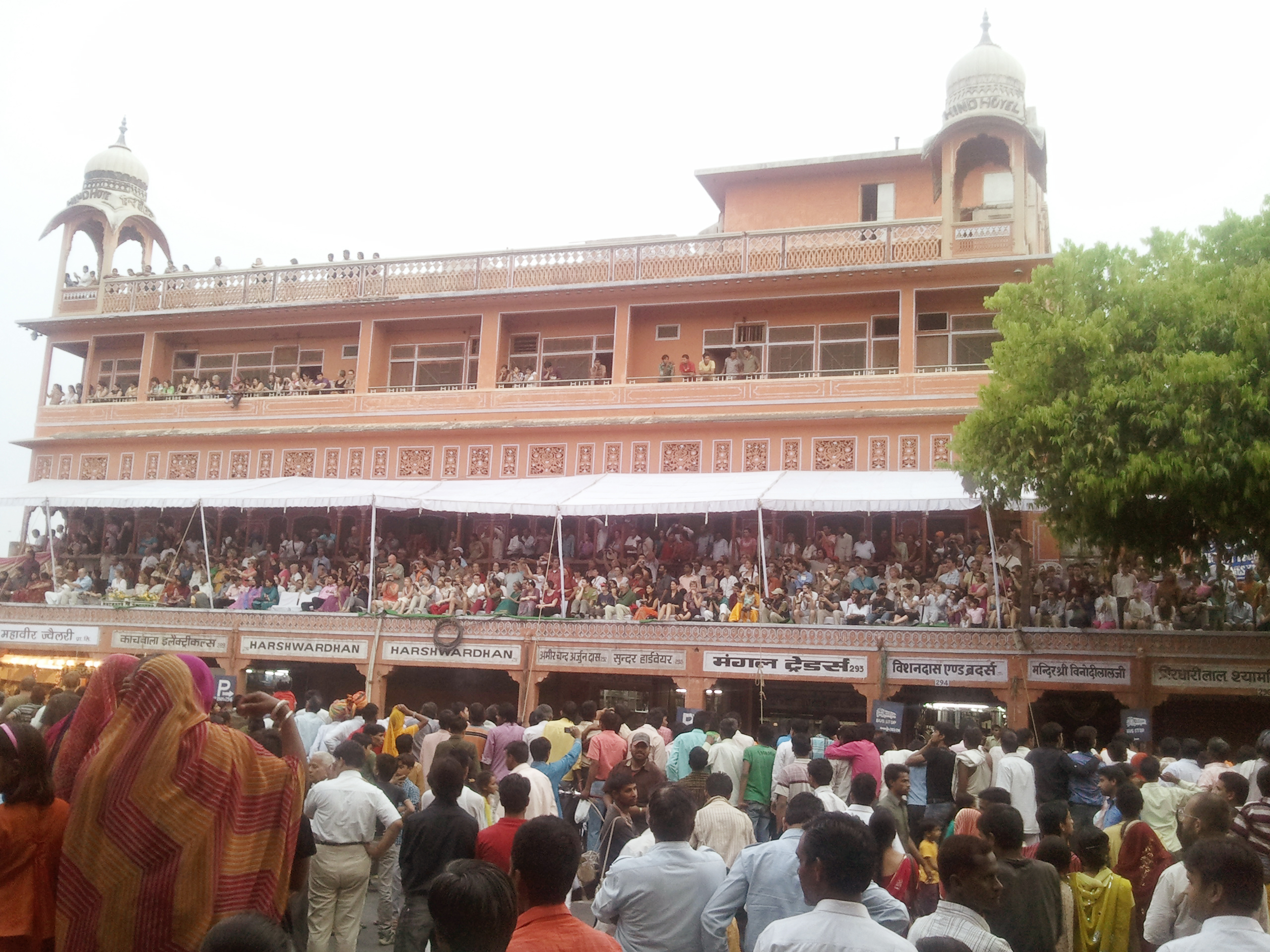
Crowd watching the procession on Gangaur festival, 2011

In Jaipur, a sweet dish called a ghevar is characteristic of the Gangaur festival. People buy ghevar to eat and distribute it among their friends and relatives. A procession, with the image of Gauri, commences from the Zanani-Deodhi of the City Palace. It then passes through Tripolia Bazaar, Chhoti Chaupar, Gangauri Bazaar, Chaugan stadium and finally converge near the Talkatora. People from all walks of life come to witness the procession.

=== Udaipur ===
Udaipur has a dedicated ghat named after Gangaur. Gangaur Ghat or Gangori Ghat is situated on the waterfront of Lake Pichola. This ghat serves as prime location for celebration of multiple festivals, including Gangaur festival. Traditional processions of Gangaur commences from the City Palace, and several other places, which passes through various areas of the city. The procession is headed by old palanquins, chariots, bullock carts and performance by folk artistes. After the processions are complete, the idols of Isar and Gauri are brought to this ghat and immersed into Lake Pichola.

== See also ==
- Gaura Parva, a similar festival celebrated in Nepal and Indian state of Uttarakhand
- Karva Chauth
- Varalakshmi Vratam
