= Teeyan =

Regional name for the Punjabi festival of Teej

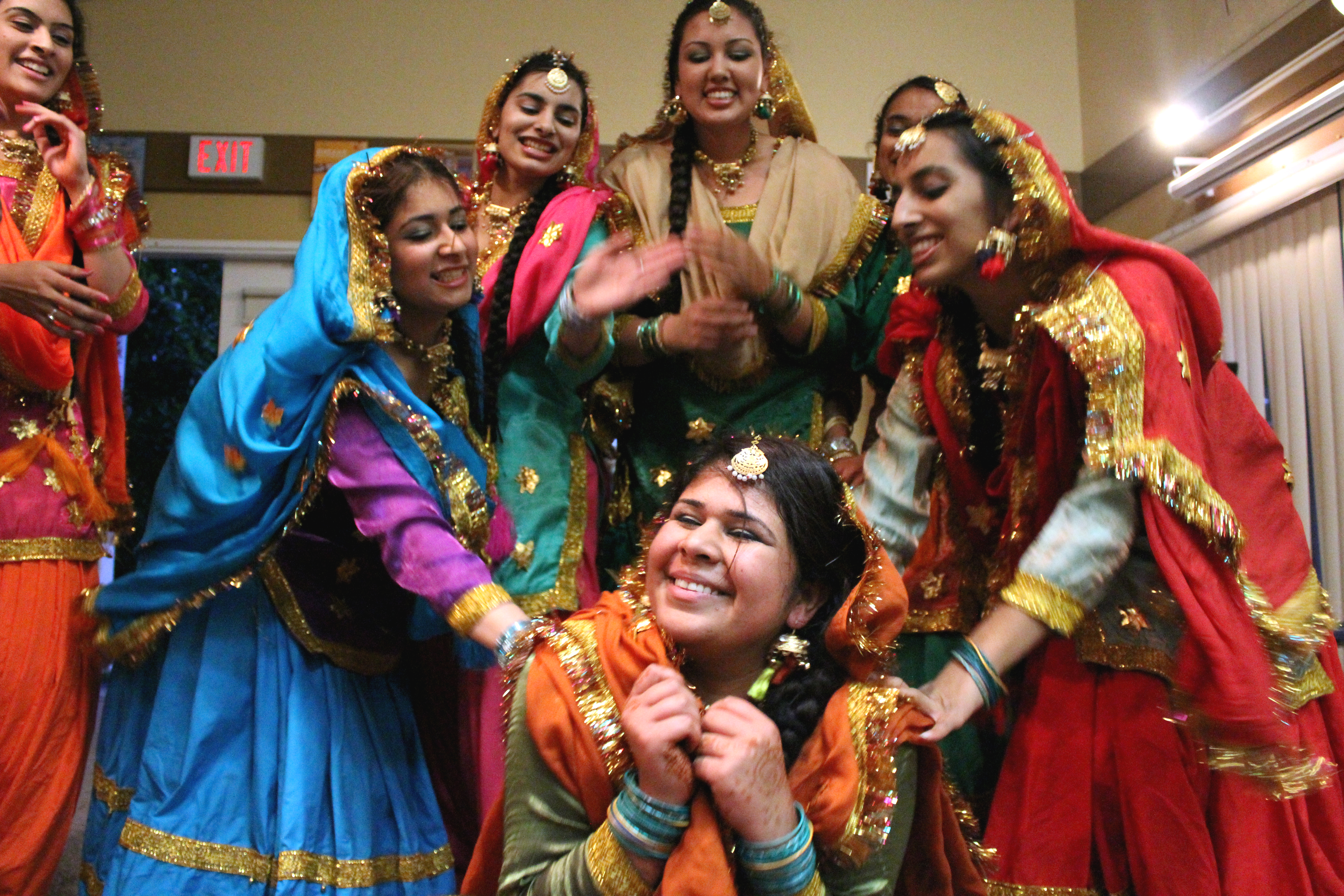
- Women celebrating Teeyan in traditional Punjabi clothing
- Official name: Teeyan Da Teohar
- Also called: Teej
- Observed by: Punjabi Women
- Type: Monsoon festival/seasonal
- Celebrations: Boliyan, Giddha
- Begins: Third day of the month of Sawan
- Ends: Full Moon in the month of Sawan
- Date: July/August

Teeyan (Punjabi: ਤੀਆਂ), also known as Teeyan Da Teohar (trans: the festival of women) or Teej, is a festival celebrated throughout Punjab which is dedicated to the onset of the monsoon and focuses on daughters sisters, and mothers.

== Celebration ==
The festival is celebrated during the monsoon season from the third day of the lunar month of Sawan on the bright half, up to the full moon of Sawan (about 13 days), by women. Married women go to their maternal house to participate in the festivities. In the past, it was traditional for women to spend the whole month of Sawan with their parents.

== Gifts ==
Whether or not a married woman goes to her parents, brothers take a gift set to their sisters called a 'sandhara'. A sandhara includes a Punjabi Suit/sari, laddoo, bangles, mehndi (henna) and a swing.

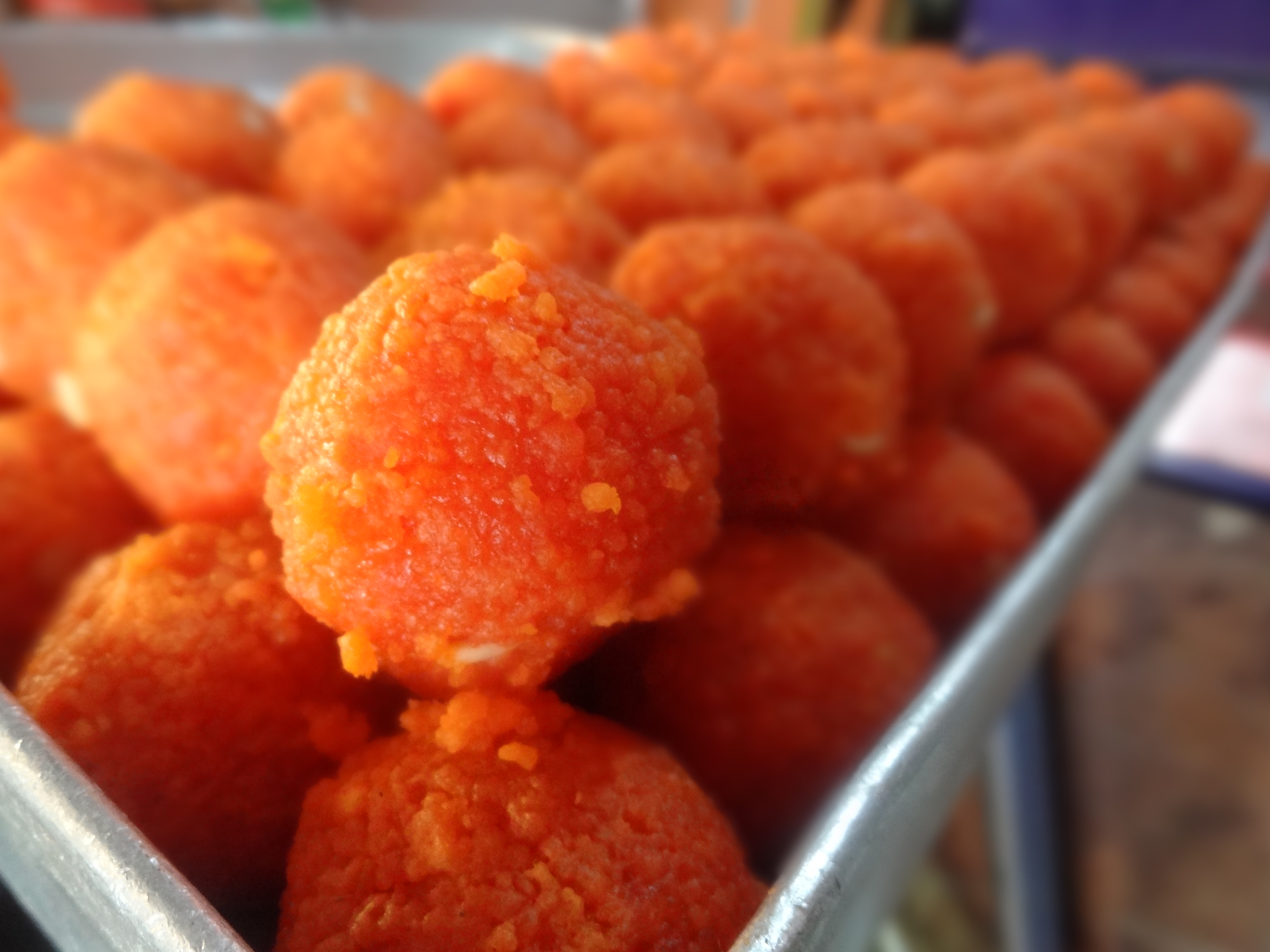
Boondi laddoo

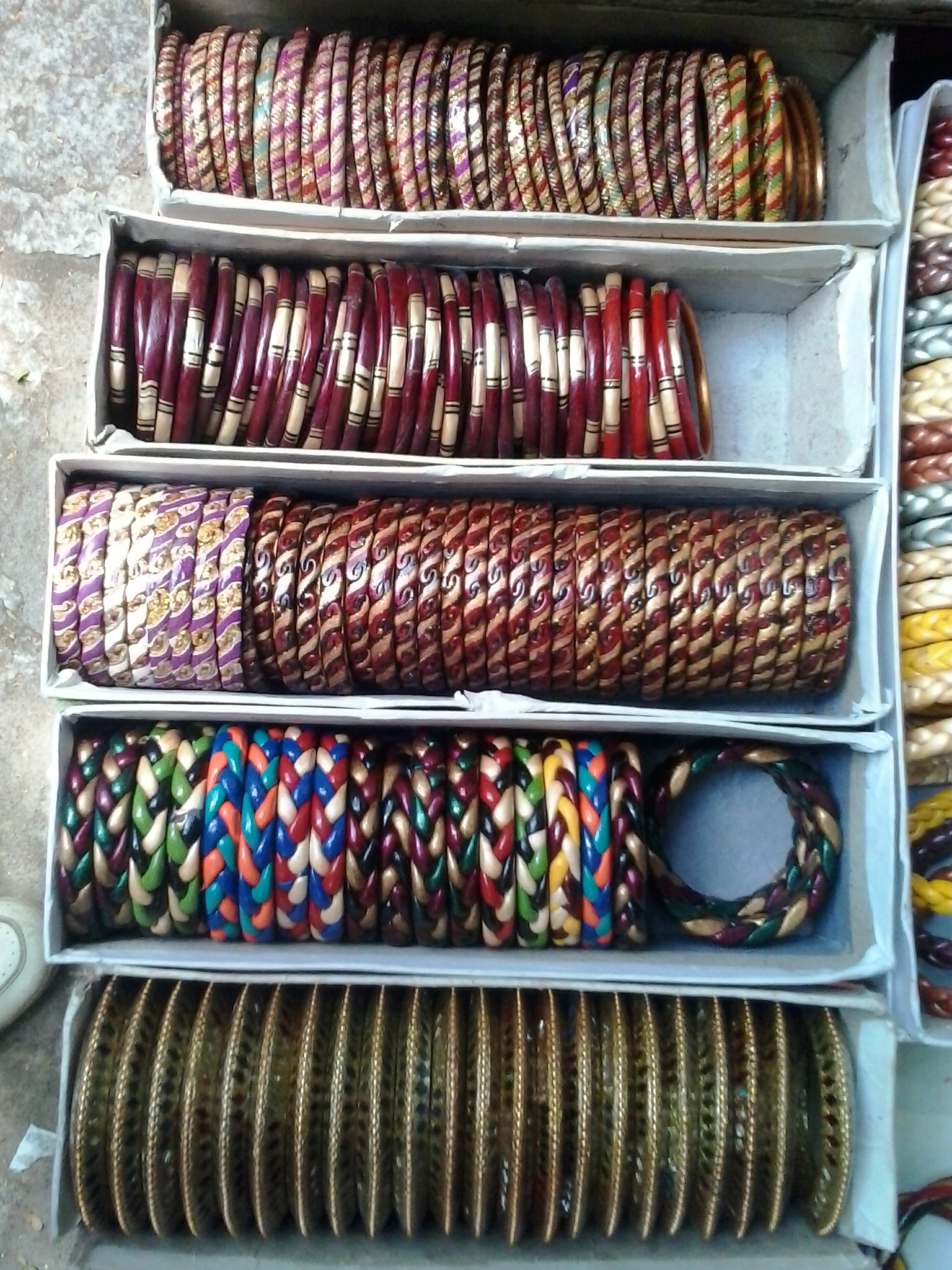
Bangles

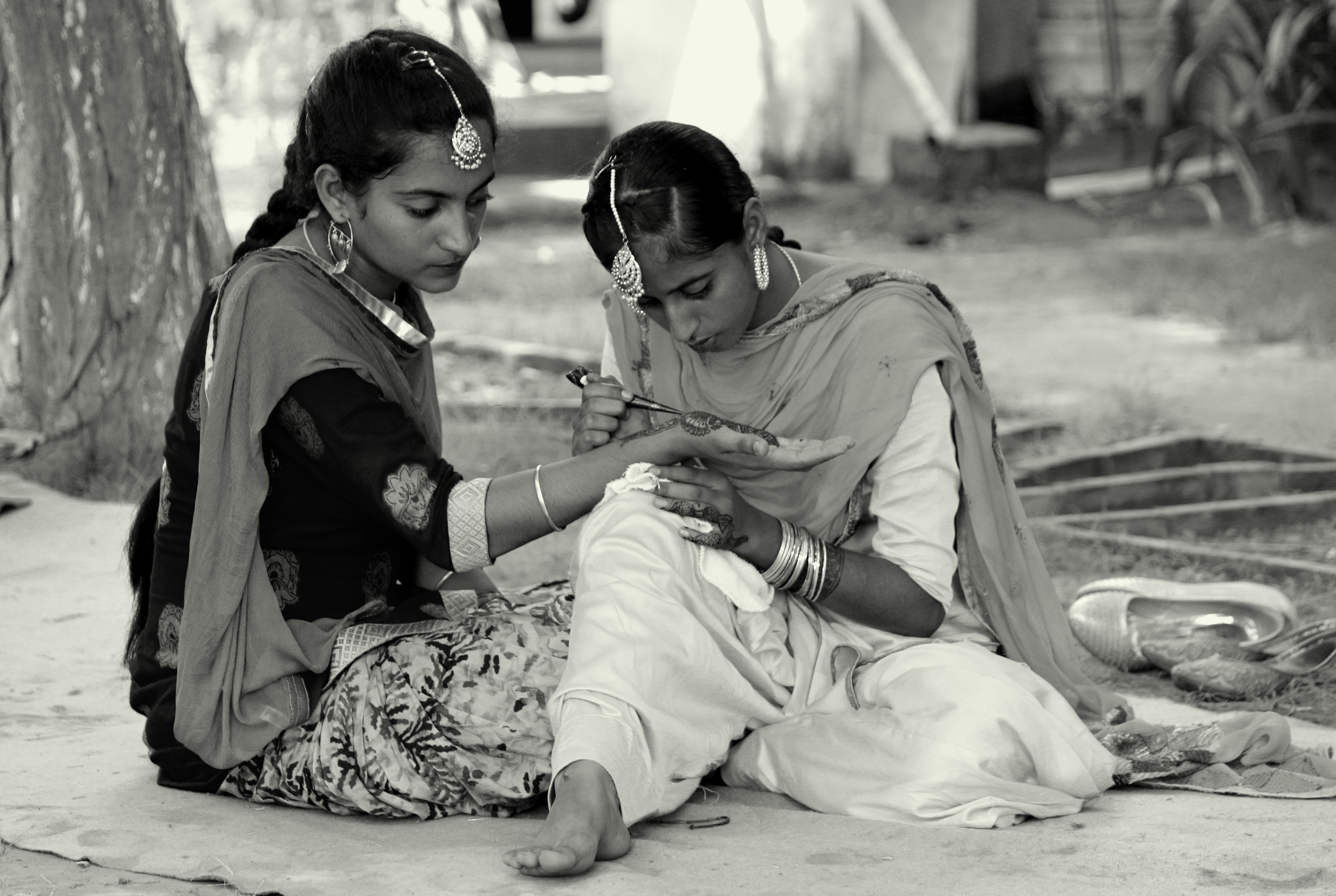
Mehandi

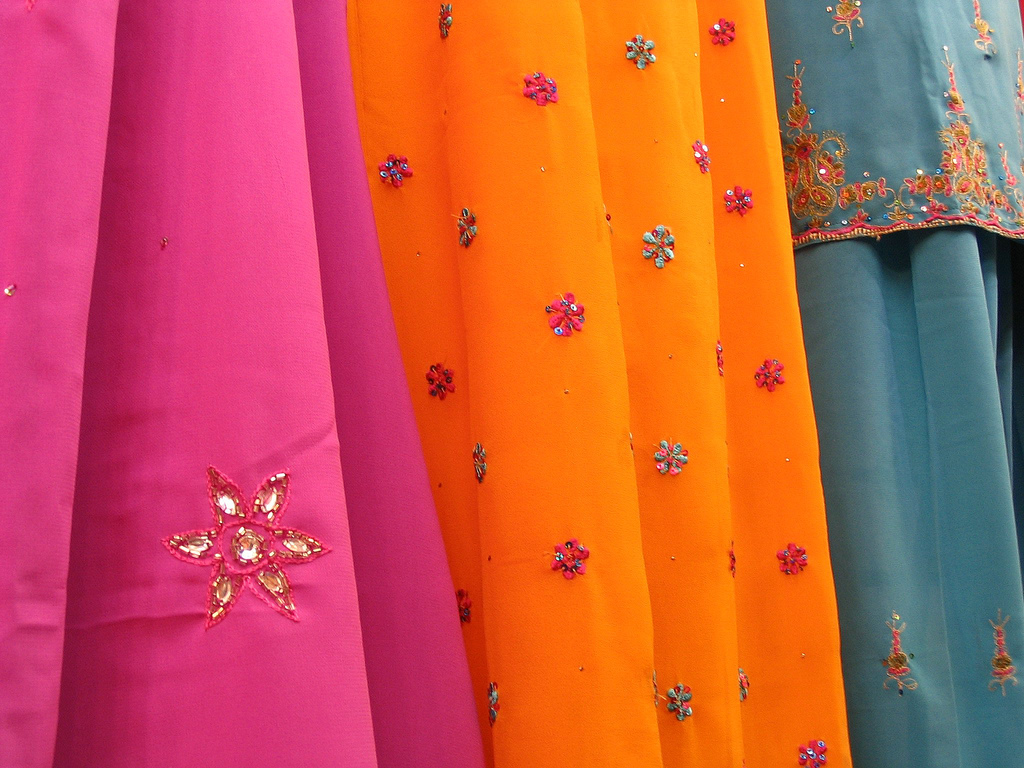
Punjabi suit

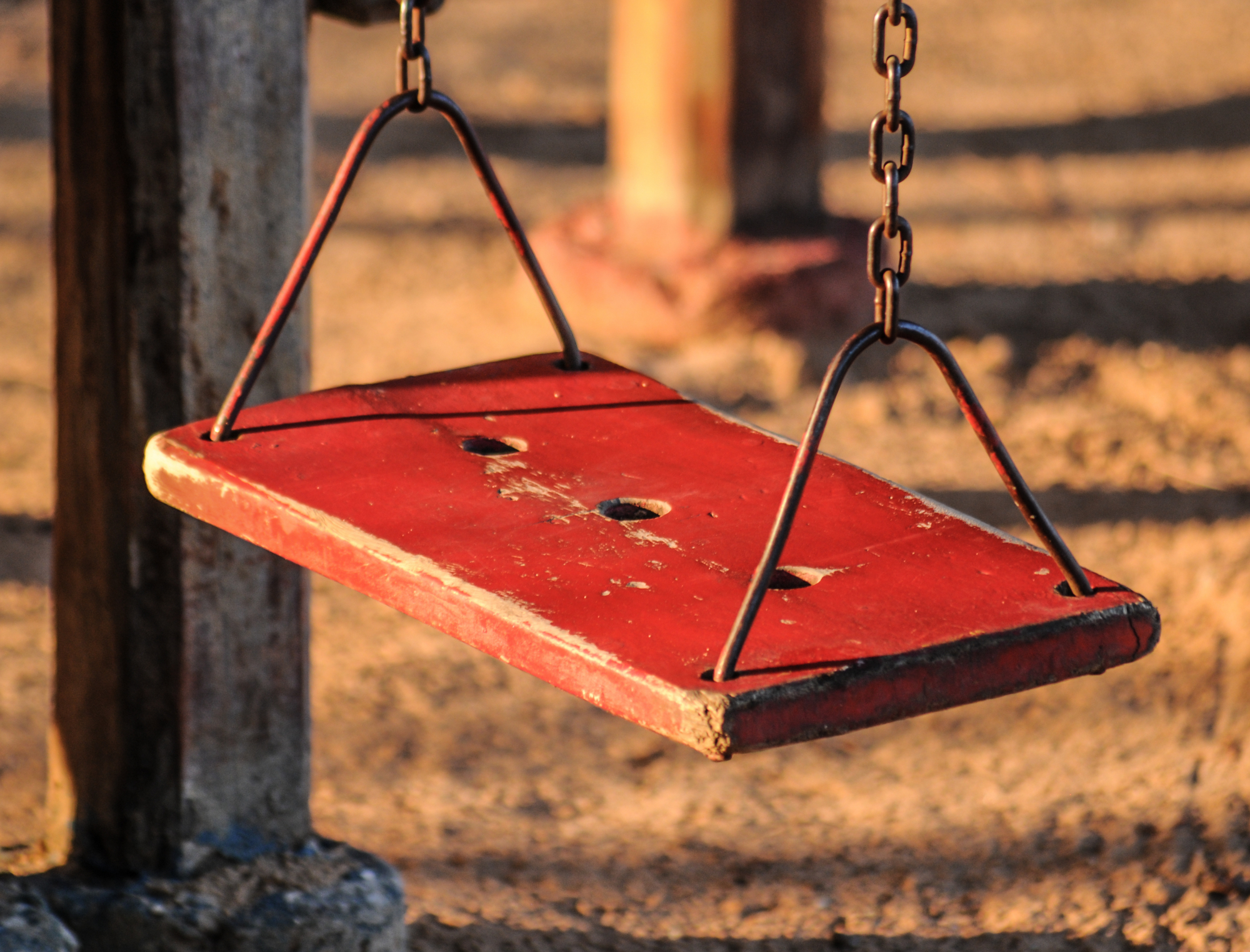
Swing

== Giddha and Swings ==
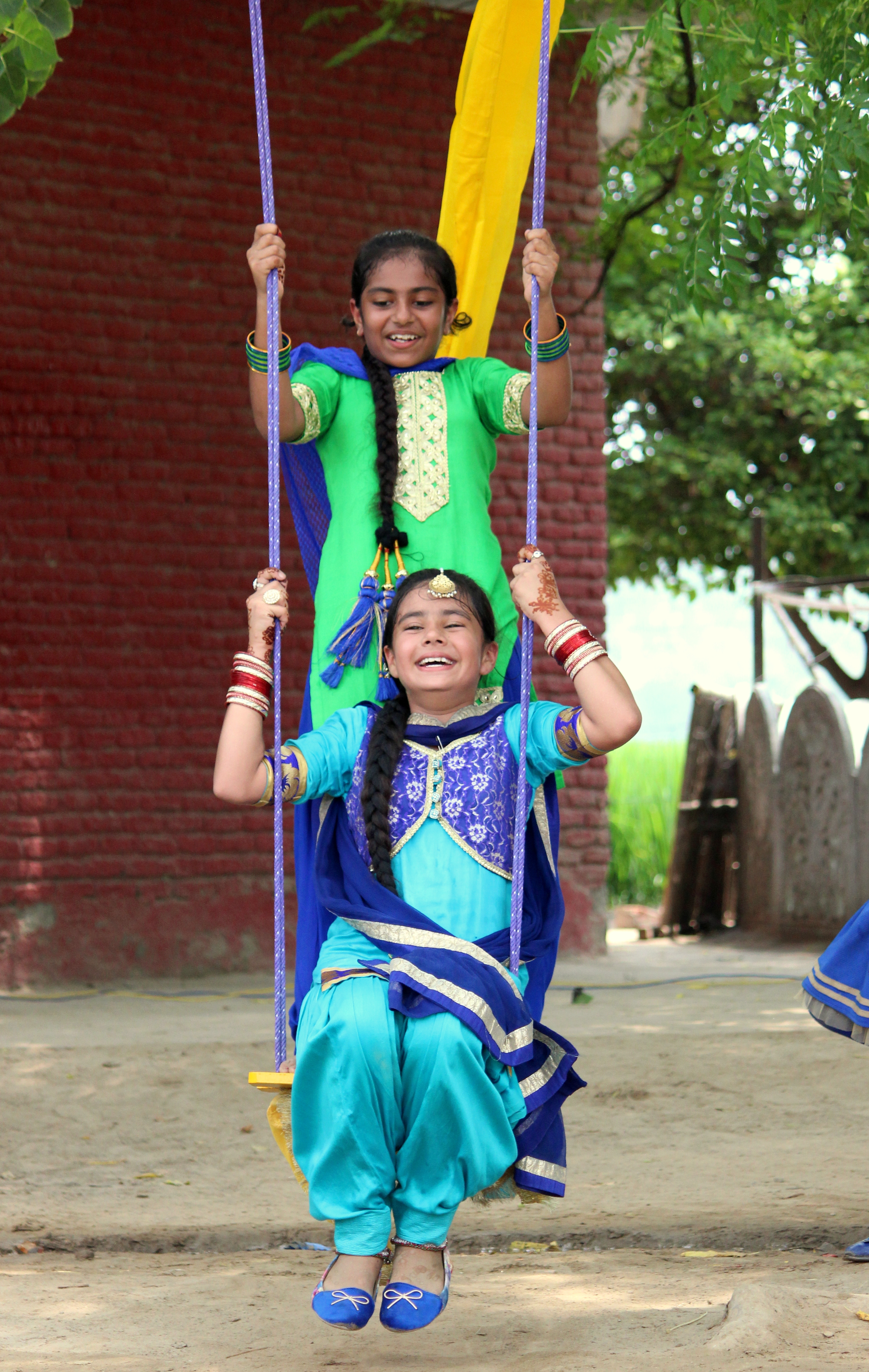
Peengh

The festival of Teeyan centers on girls and women getting together in the village green and tying swings to the trees. Devendra Satyarthi collected folk songs related to the month of Sawan sung during the festival of Teeyan which were first published in his book Giddha, in 1936. Satyarthi observed that the festival is inaugurated by women singing songs welcoming the monsoon season and hoping for bountiful rains. The festival gathers momentum in the Teeyan Giddha, which is performed to the singing of traditional Boliyan such as the one below.

Punjabi:

ਓੁੱਚੇ ਟਾਹਣੇ ਪੀਂਘ ਪਾ ਦੇ
ਜਿਥੇ ਆਪ ਹੁਲਾਰਾ ਆਵੇ

Romanization:

Uchay tahne peeng pa de
jithey aap hulara aavey

Translation

Hang my swing from a high tree branch
where the swing moves by itself

In the past, the festival would last for as long as the girls wished ranging from a few days to four weeks. Girls would often gather to dance Giddha every day. The festival would close by the women performing the closing dance called 'Bhallho'. Bhallho or Ballo is performed by the women standing in two rows and dancing. This tradition of women getting together in villages has now become mostly extinct. Brar (2007) writing about his memories of the early twentieth century Punjab, recollects that fairs were organised for the Teeyan festivities.

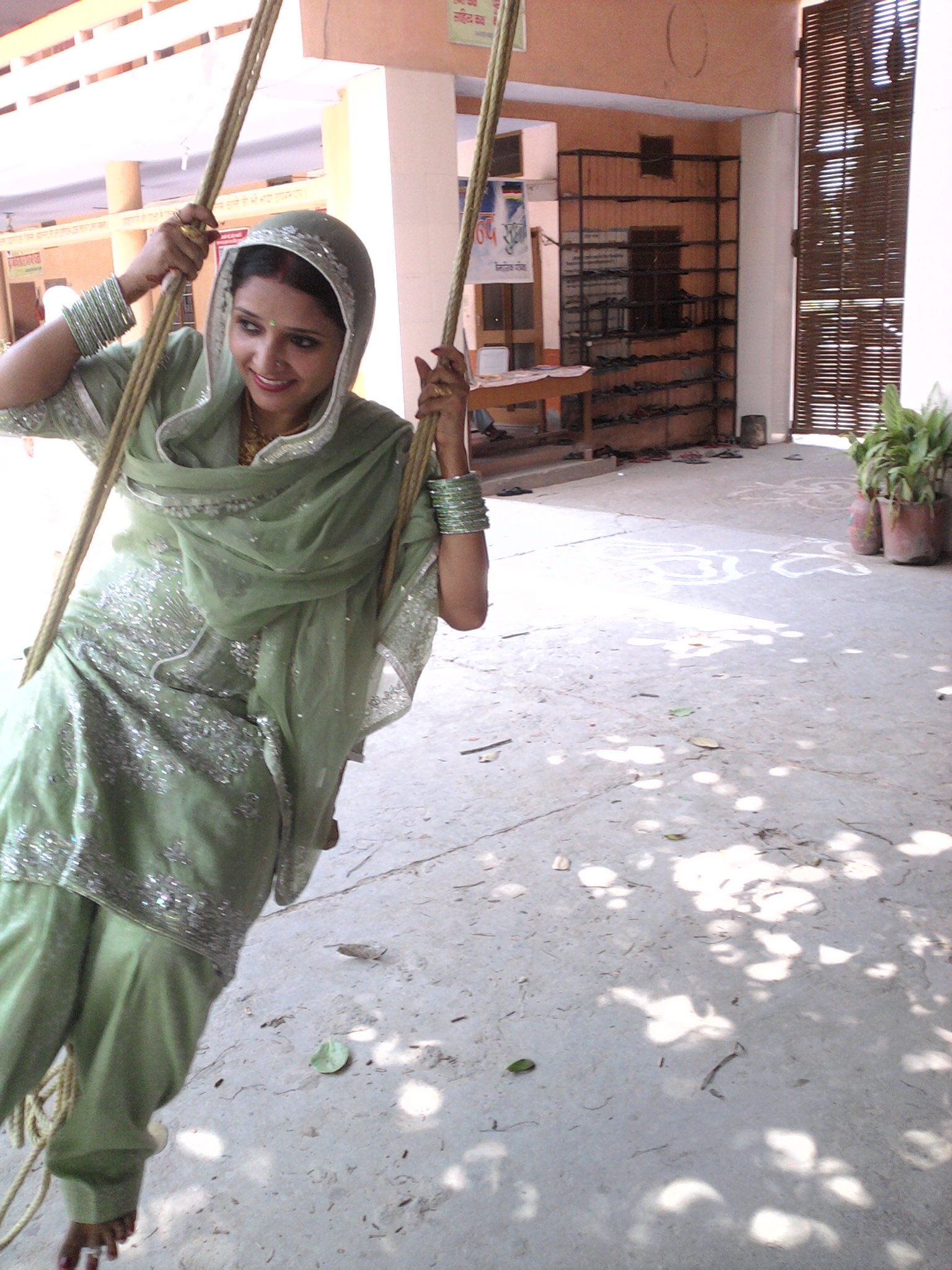
Woman celebrating Teeyan

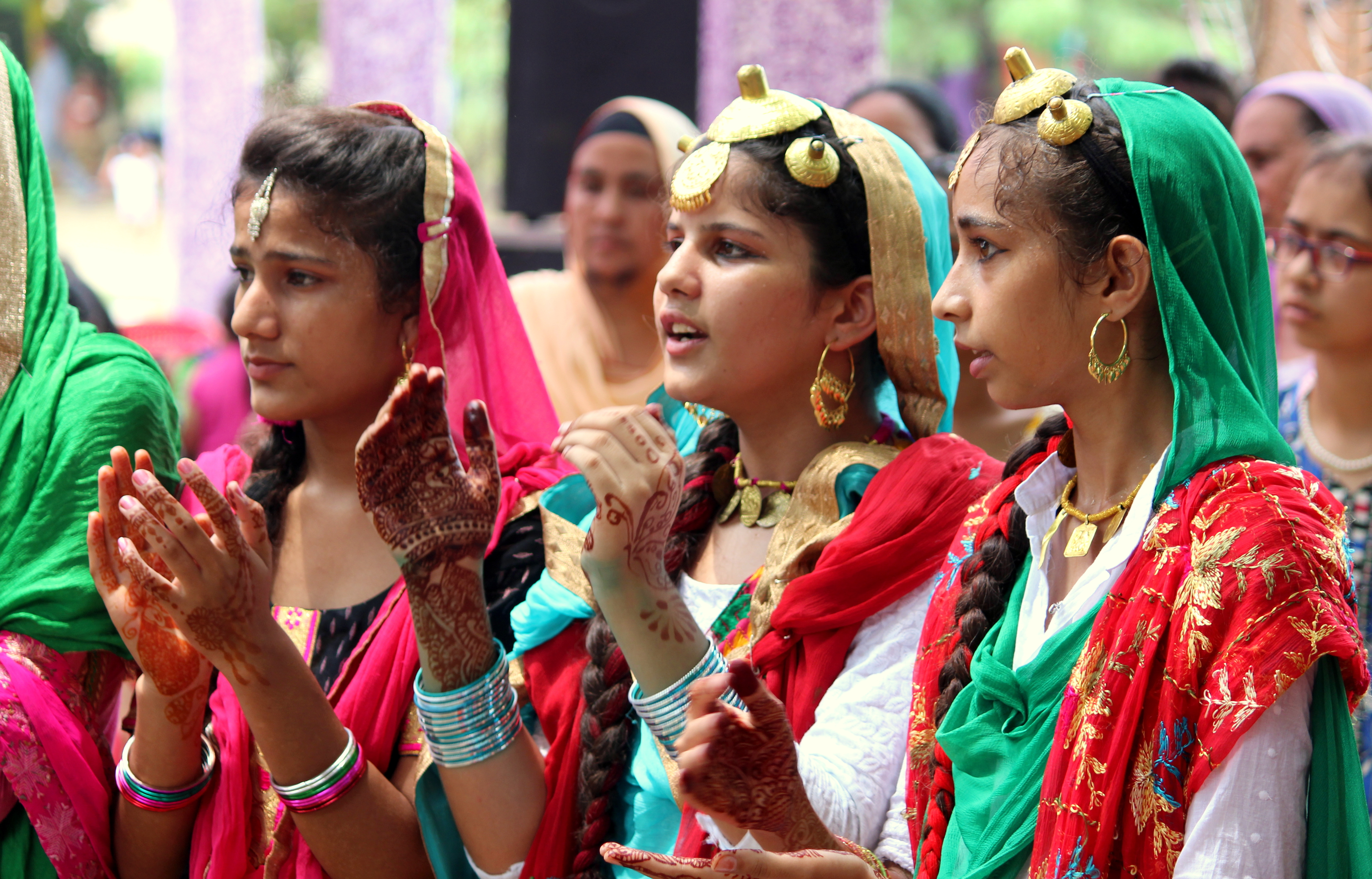
Women singing Boliyan

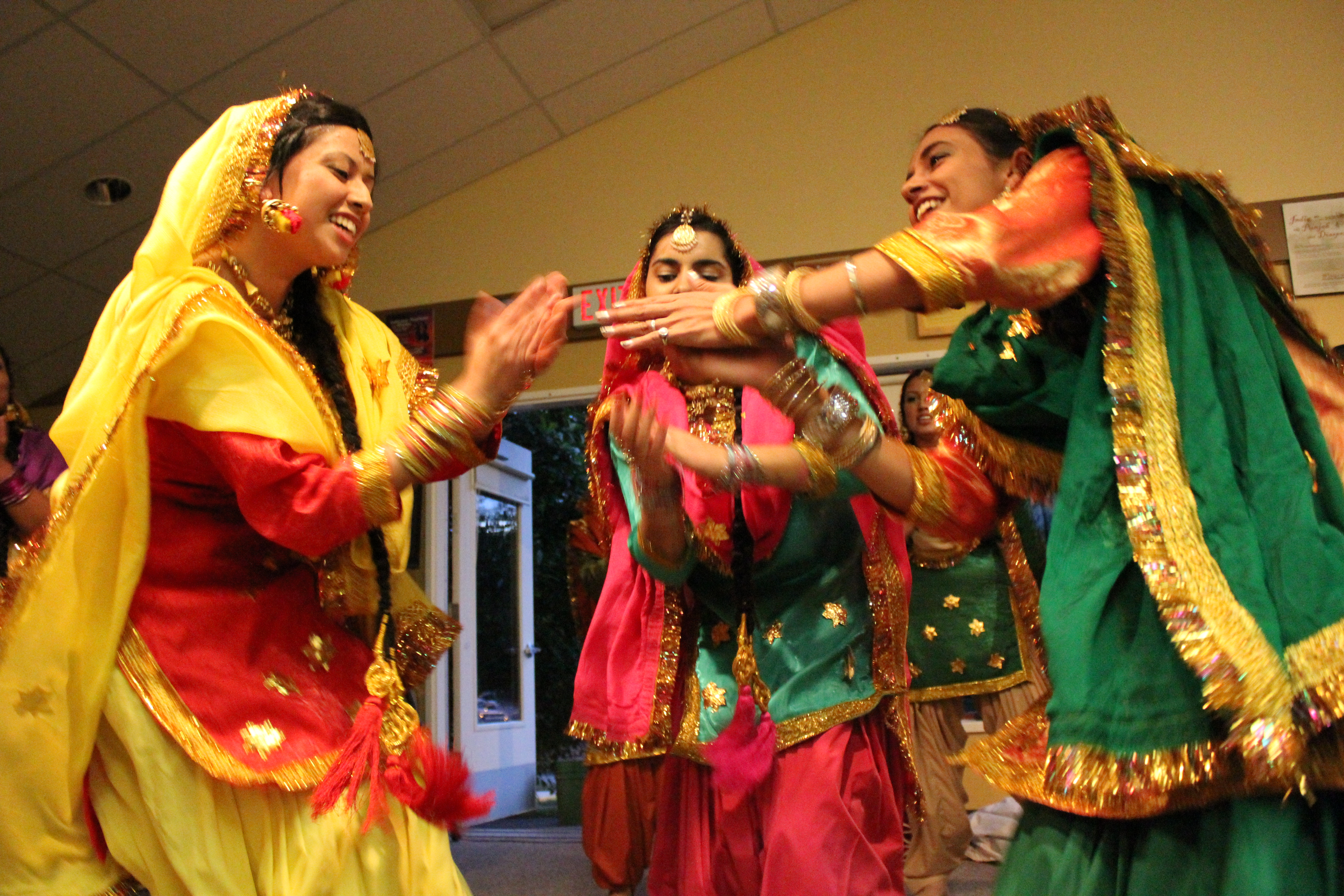
Giddha dance

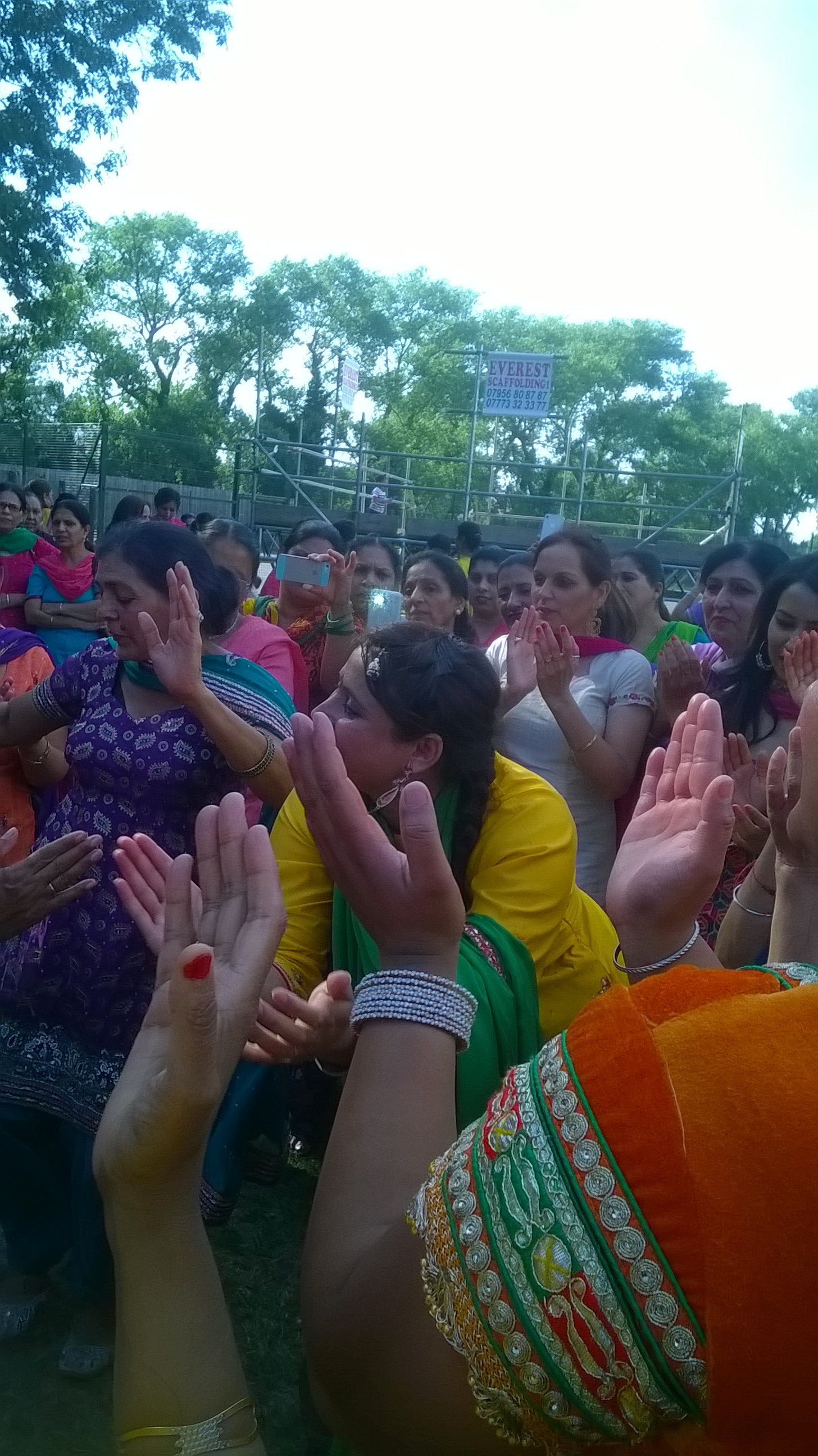
Teeyan Giddha

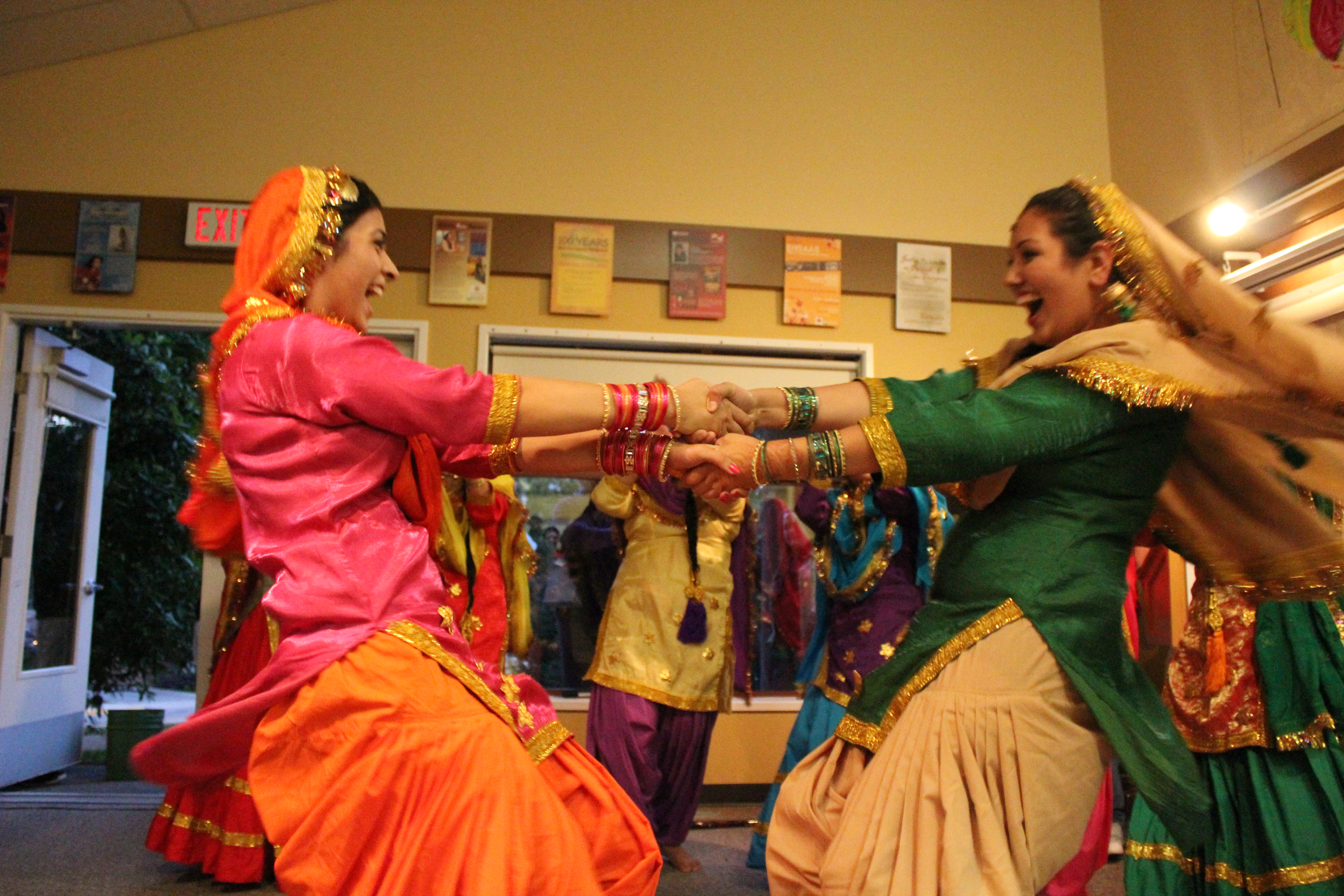
Women performing Kikkli

== Food ==
The food traditionally associated at Teeyan is:

- Kheer (Punjabi: ਖੀਰ) is a rice pudding
- Poorhi (Punjabi: ਪੂਰ੍ਹੀ) is a type fried bread
- Halwa (Punjabi: ਹਲਵਾ)
- Malpura
- Gulgullay (Punjabi: ਗੁਲਗੁਲੇ) which are made from jaggery syrup mixed with wheat flour and then made into balls, and then fried
- Mandey (Punjabi: ਮੰਡੇ) are made of wheat floor but the dough is thin. The flat mandey bread is not rolled out using a rolling pin but stretched with the hands and then placed on the back of both hands before being put on the griddle to bake.
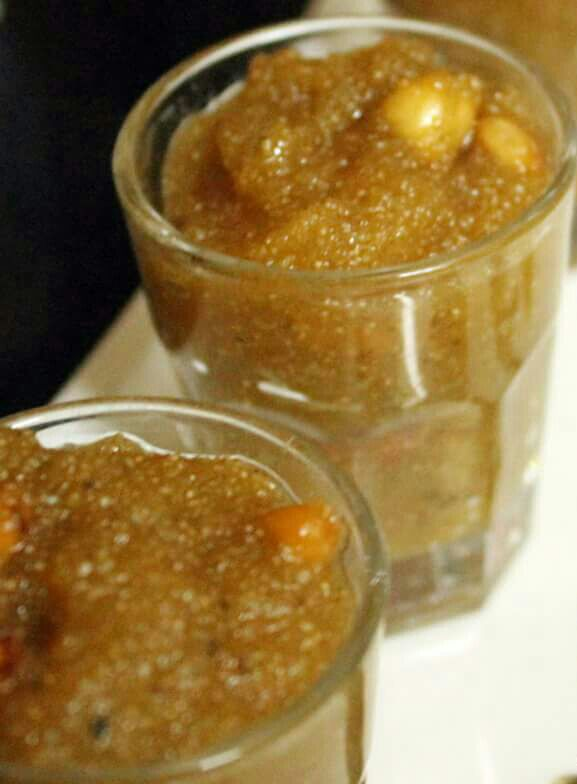
Punjab da halwa

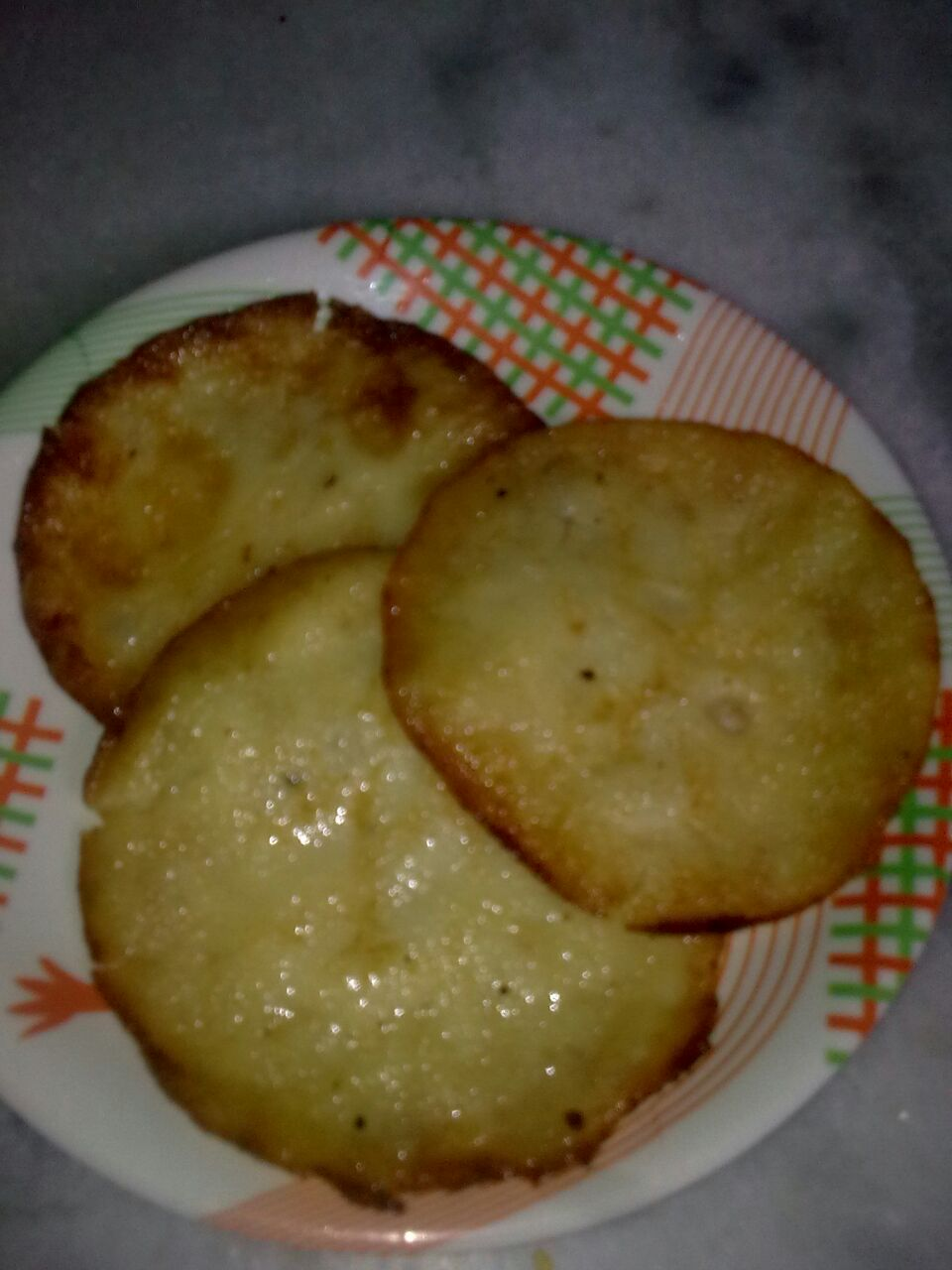
Malpura sweet-dish

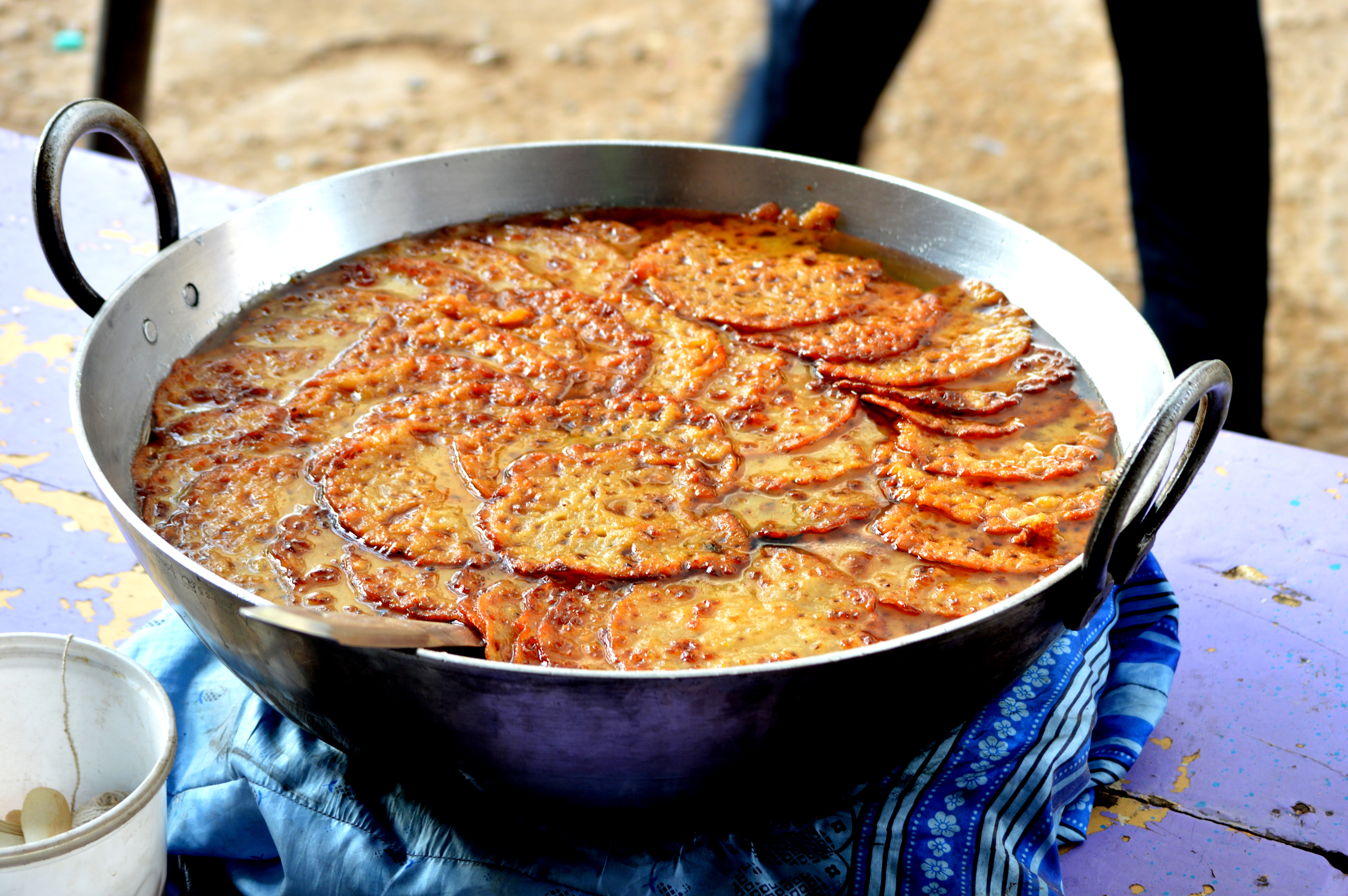
Malpura

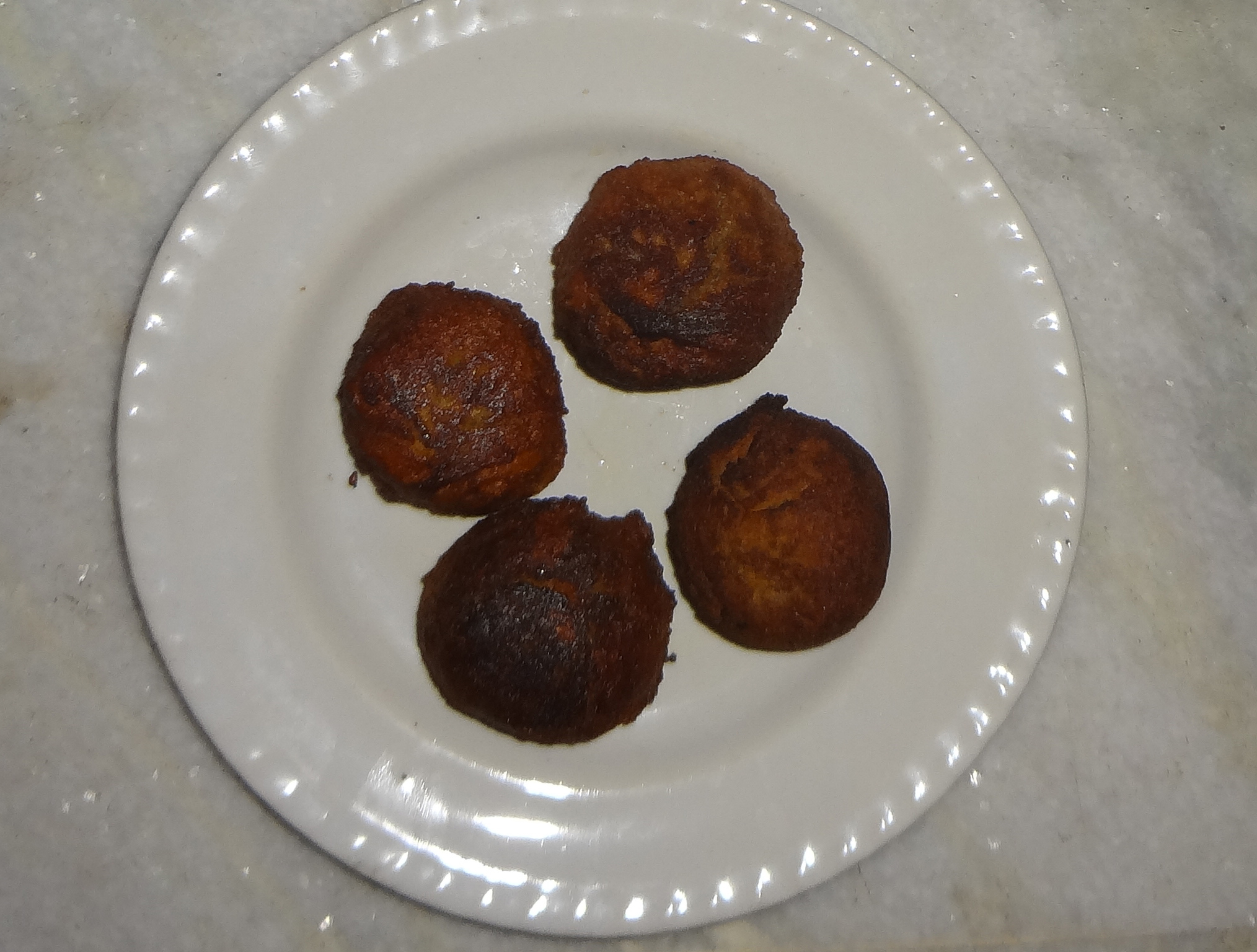
Gulgule

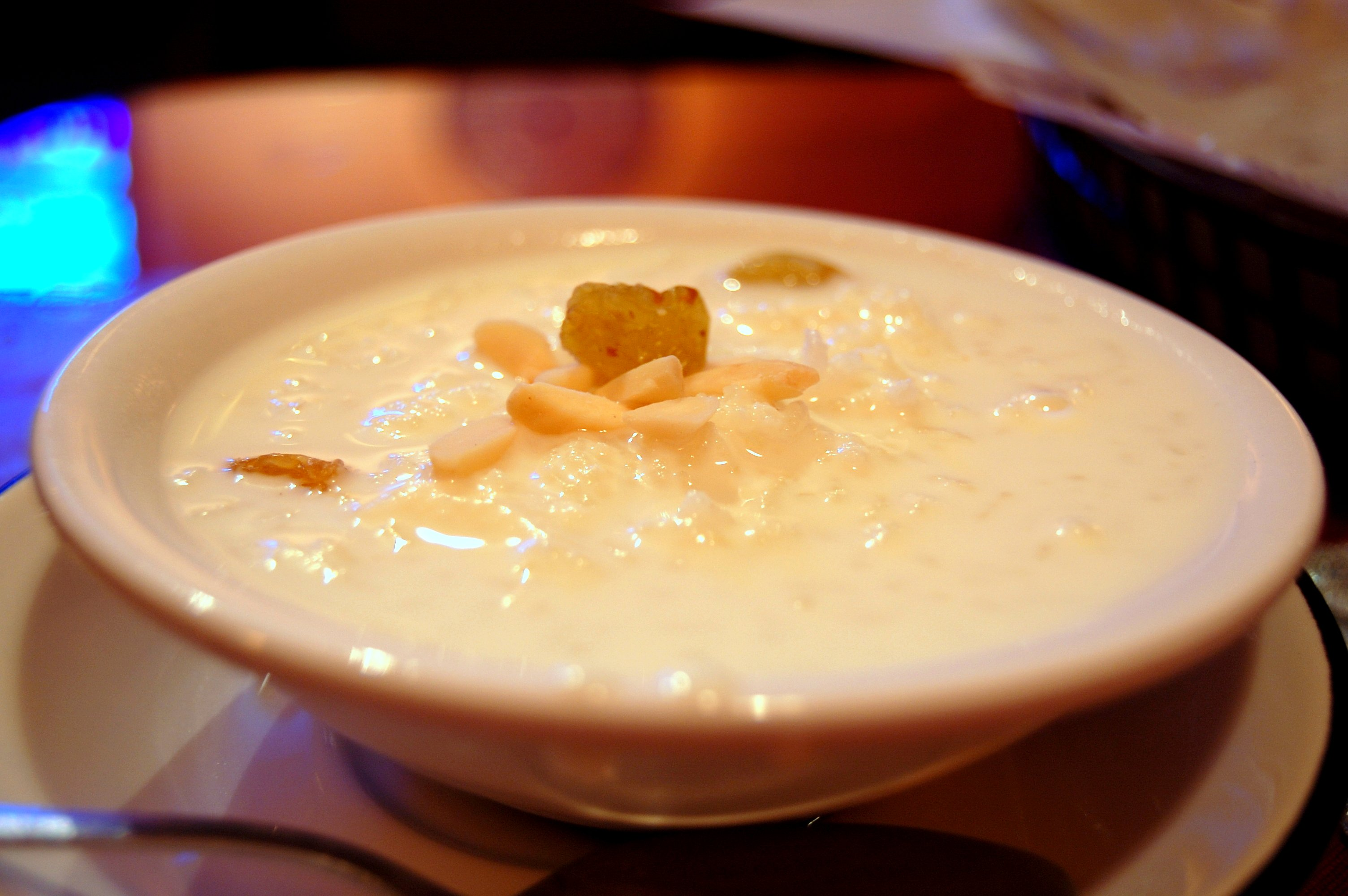
Kheer

== Observance ==
Punjabis consider Teeyan, also called Sawe, as a seasonal festival. It is celebrated especially in schools and colleges as the focus of the festival is often on young women. In recent years, there has been a revival of the festival. Teeyan gatherings are being held in villages and cities alike. However, the current trend is to hire banqueting halls, disc jockeys and singers. Politicians and celebrities sometimes attend such gatherings. In some cases, teeyan gatherings take place in the village's open land. Women in the Punjabi diaspora organise Teeyan gatherings which provide an opportunity for women to preserve the Punjabi culture.
