= Dhaba =

Roadside restaurants in the Indian subcontinent

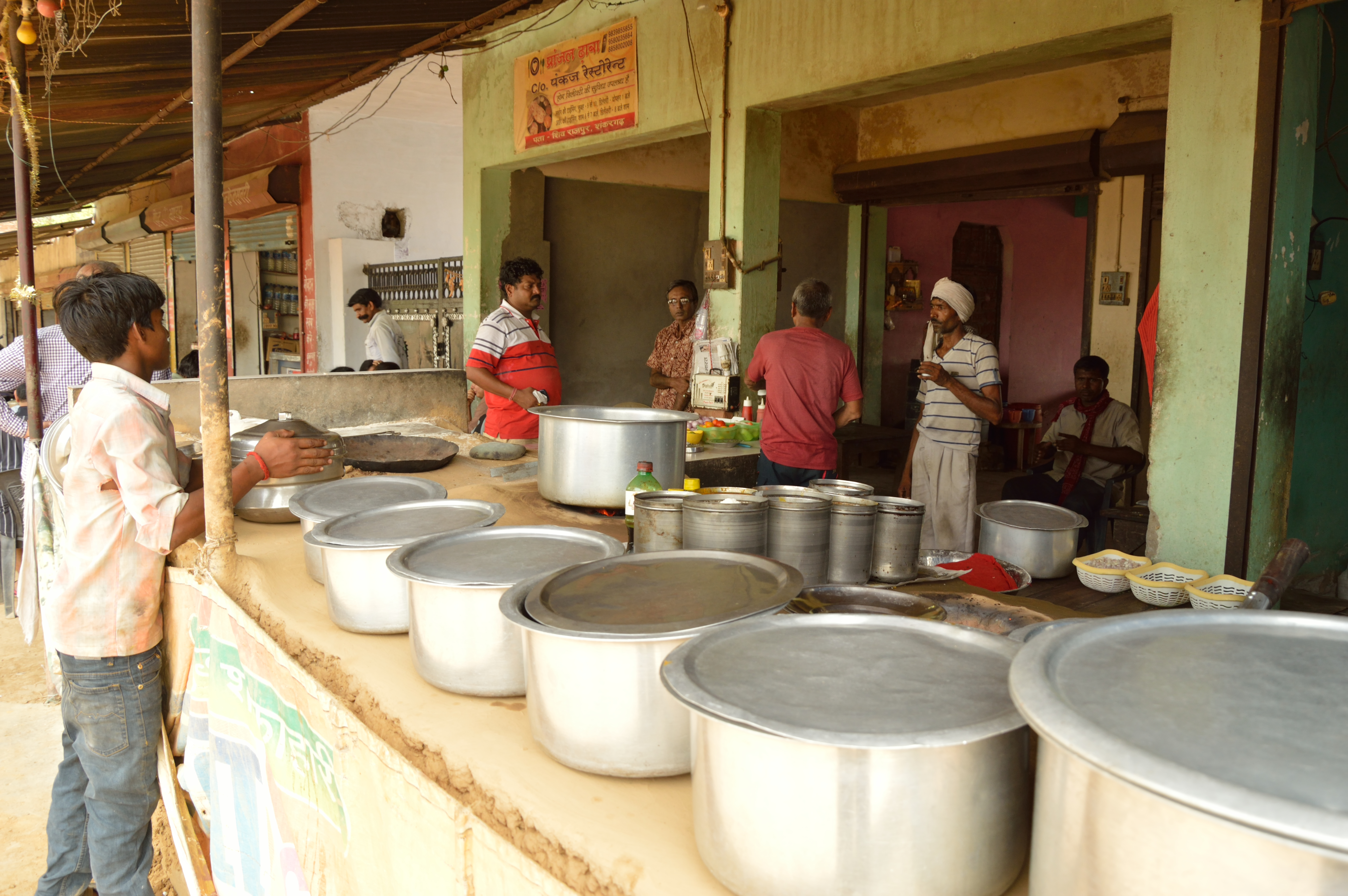
A dhaba on National Highway 76 near Prayagraj, Uttar Pradesh, India.

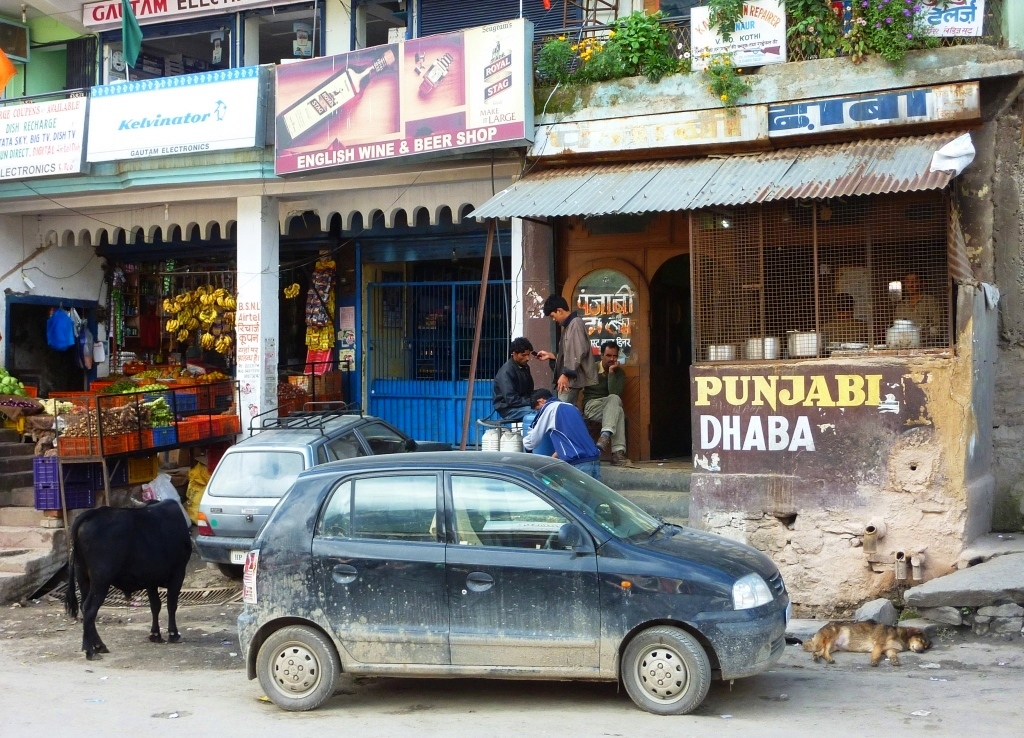
A dhaba at Rekong Peo, Himachal Pradesh, India

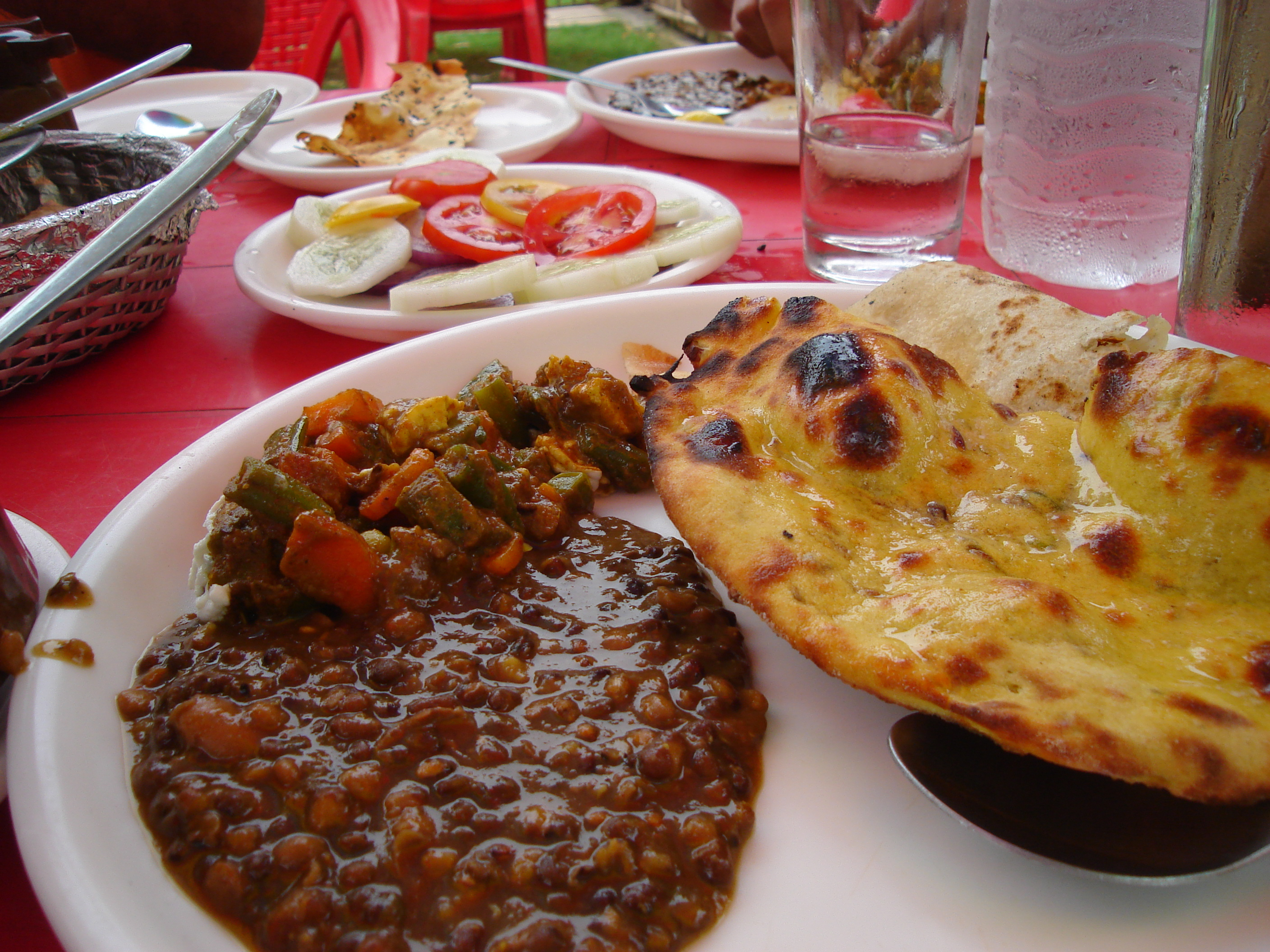
Food at a dhaba in Punjab, India.

A dhaba (Hindi: [ɖʰaːbaː], Punjabi: [ʈàːbaː]) is a roadside restaurant in South Asia. They are on highways, generally serve local cuisine, and also serve as truck stops. They are most commonly found next to petrol stations, and most are open 24 hours a day.

Dhabas are a common feature on national and state highways. Earlier frequented only by truck drivers, today eating at a dhaba, whether urban or roadside, is a trend. Dhabas have additionally been established by South Asian diaspora communities in countries including the United States.

== Etymology and description ==
The word has been alleged in folk etymology to stem from dabba, m., box, lunch box, tiffin.

Dhabas sprung up first on GT Road, which ran from Peshawar, Rawalpindi, and Lahore through Amritsar, Ludhiana, and further to Delhi and Calcutta.

Dhabas were characterized by mud structures and cots to sit upon (charpai) while eating. A wooden plank would be placed across the width of the cot on which to place the dishes. With time, the cots were replaced by tables. Dahabas offer inexpensive food and relaxing environment.

== In North America ==
A large network of Indian and Pakistani immigrant communities has developed worldwide, and many have opened dhabas abroad, such as at truck stops on the Trans-Canada Highway network.

As of 2023, it was estimated that there were approximately 40 dhabas in the United States, which has been credited to the growing number of Punjabi American truckers.

== Cuisine ==
Dhabas serve wholesome, rustic flavors at affordable prices. It has been synonymous with Punjabi cuisine, which have Persian, Afghanistan, and Central Asian influences. They are served with brass or copper utensils, which supposedly have health benefits. Drinks – water, lassi, milk (of several varieties), or tea, as well as shorbas (soups) – are served. It is very common for alcohol (such as whisky or Desi Daru) to be sold at non-vegetarian dhabas in Punjab.

Both vegetarian and non-vegetarian cuisines are served. The vegetarian fares are termed vaishno dhabas. Dal makhni is a popular dish in the vegetarian dhaba, whereas butter chicken or tandoori chicken are typically favoured in non-vegetarian dhabas (especially in Punjab). Ghee and white butter are used generously in said dishes. Butter chicken, dal, kadhi, and flatbreads are typical menu items.

== Tandoor ==
The tandoor (also called 'tandooria' or dhatti) is a barrel-shaped clay or earthenware oven, where the food is cooked. It is a versatile kitchen appliance for making rotis and naans and a social institution. In rural North India, the community tandoor, dug in the ground and either coal-fired or (more recently) electrically heated, is a meeting place for women, who bring the kneaded atta (dough) and sometimes marinated meats to have them cooked while socialising. Until a few years ago, this phenomenon existed in urban neighbourhoods, too. Even today, a few neighbourhoods in Delhi and Lahore have a community tandoor.

== Ingredients ==
Most menus are made according to the season. The universal favourite is chole bhature which is a year-round item and is available at every wayside dhaba; it originated in Northern India but is now found anywhere in the Indian subcontinent or other countries where the South Asian diaspora have migrated in large numbers. But, the pride of the Punjabi winter cuisine is sarson ka saag (curry made out of mustard leaves) served with blobs of white butter accompanied by makki ki roti and lassi.

Some ingredients are:

- Wheat and maize (the staple food grains), all lentils, especially legumes, black gram and yellow gram, rajma (kidney beans), and chana.
- Spices such as coriander, cumin, cloves, cinnamon, cardamom, black pepper, red chili powder, turmeric, and mustard seeds. One of the main crops is mustard or sarson: Its leaves are used to make sarson da-saag curry while its seeds are used for tempering and for making mustard oil, which is widely used as a cooking medium.
- Milk and dairy products such as dahi, paneer cream, butter and ghee are used. Butter is an important cooking medium apart from being consumed raw along with the food.
- Chicken and fish.
- All types of vegetables.

== Menu ==
=== Vegetarian specialties ===
The simple vegetarian meal served could be a paratha of many kinds depending on the type of vegetable stuffing one wishes to have – among these the aloo paratha is the most popular. Parathas stuffed with cooked, mashed and spiced vegetables such as cauliflower are popular for breakfast with curds or tea.

A vegetarian meal – for lunch or dinner – consists of chana masala, pindi chana, vegetables and lentils, sarson ka saag, palak paneer, bharwan karela, subz korma, rajma or kadhi.

Paneer dishes are common in a vegetarian menu. It is cooked with every kind of vegetable, the popular dishes of such variety are palak paneer or saag paneer, mutter paneer, paneer makhani etc.

Naan and paratha, rotis made of maize flour (makki di roti), chappatis made out of maize flour, and rumali roti are typical Indian breads.

The basic gravy used for vegetables and meat dishes is onion-tomato-garlic-ginger.

=== Rice ===
A predominantly wheat-eating people, the Punjabis cook rice only on special occasions. Rice is rarely cooked plain or steamed and is always made with a flavouring of cumin or fried onions. Sada chawal – plain rice – is served with other wheat-based dishes. Vegetable biryani (fried veg rice) is also a favourite dish.

In winter, rice cooked with jaggery is gurwala chawal, or rao ki kheer, a delicacy when cooked on slow fire for hours with sugarcane juice, and sometimes rice is also cooked with green peas.

=== Non-vegetarian options ===
Authentic items include kadhai murg, tandoori chicken, tali machali amritsar, rara gosht, chicken tikka masala, peppery tandoori chicken, anda paneer (egg curry), seek kebabs, butter chicken, vegetarian and non-vegetarian kathi rolls, etc.

Non-vegetarian popular starters include kebabs – gosht pudhina sheek, tangri, macchi hariyali tikka, and chicken tikka.

Murg yakhni shorba and chicken shorba are popular soups.

Most meat delicacies are eaten with plain rice, phulka, or tandoori roti without ghee or butter.

=== Drinks ===
Drinks served at a vegetarian dhaba normally include lassi, milk, water and fresh fruit juice.

Non-Vegetarian dhabas often serve the same drinks as their Vegetarian counterparts, but often also include alcoholic beverages at a cheaper price, especially in Punjab. Such drinks normally include whisky, desi daru and beer (served in bottles like Kingfisher).

=== Sweets or desserts ===
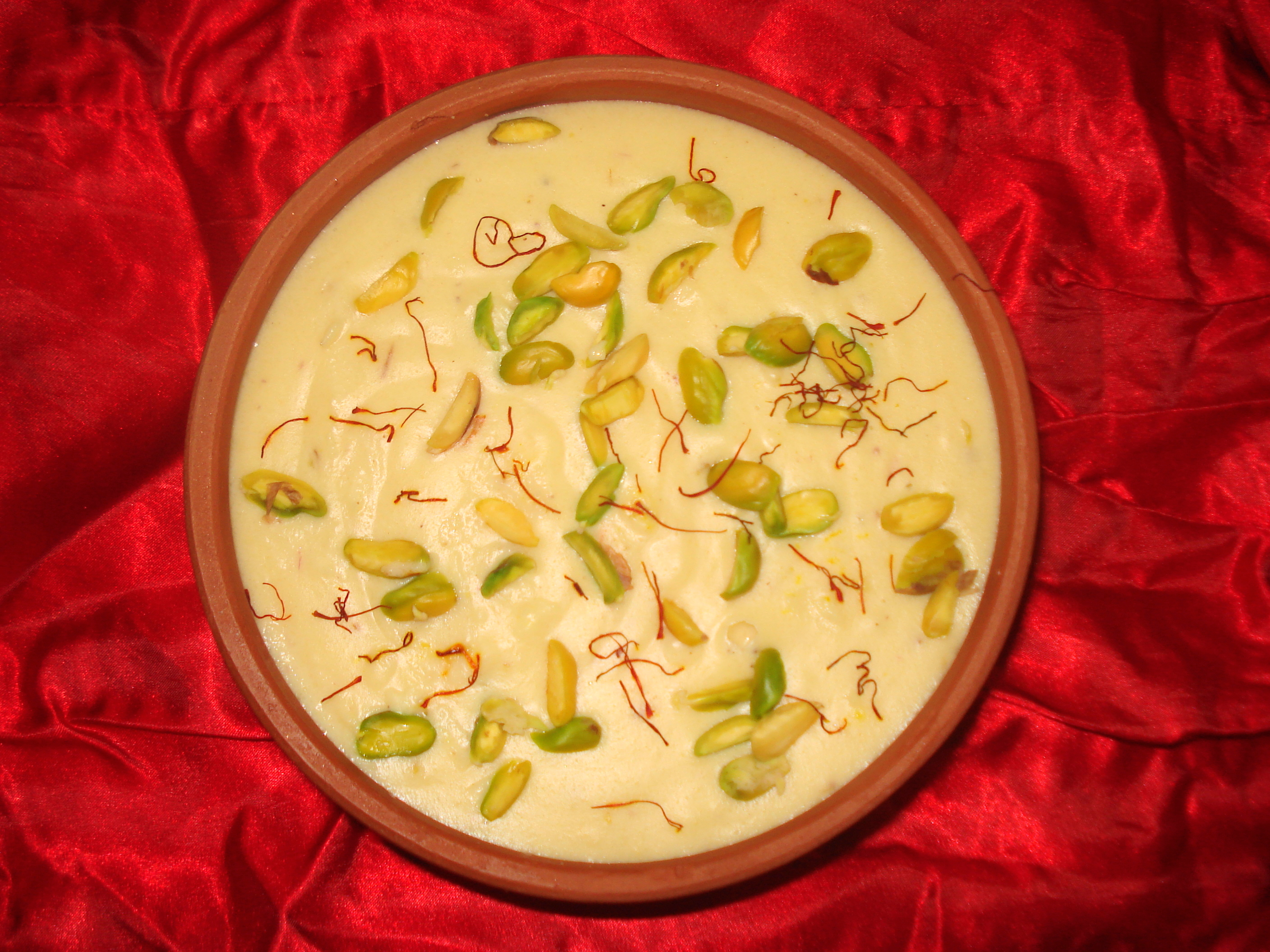
Firni

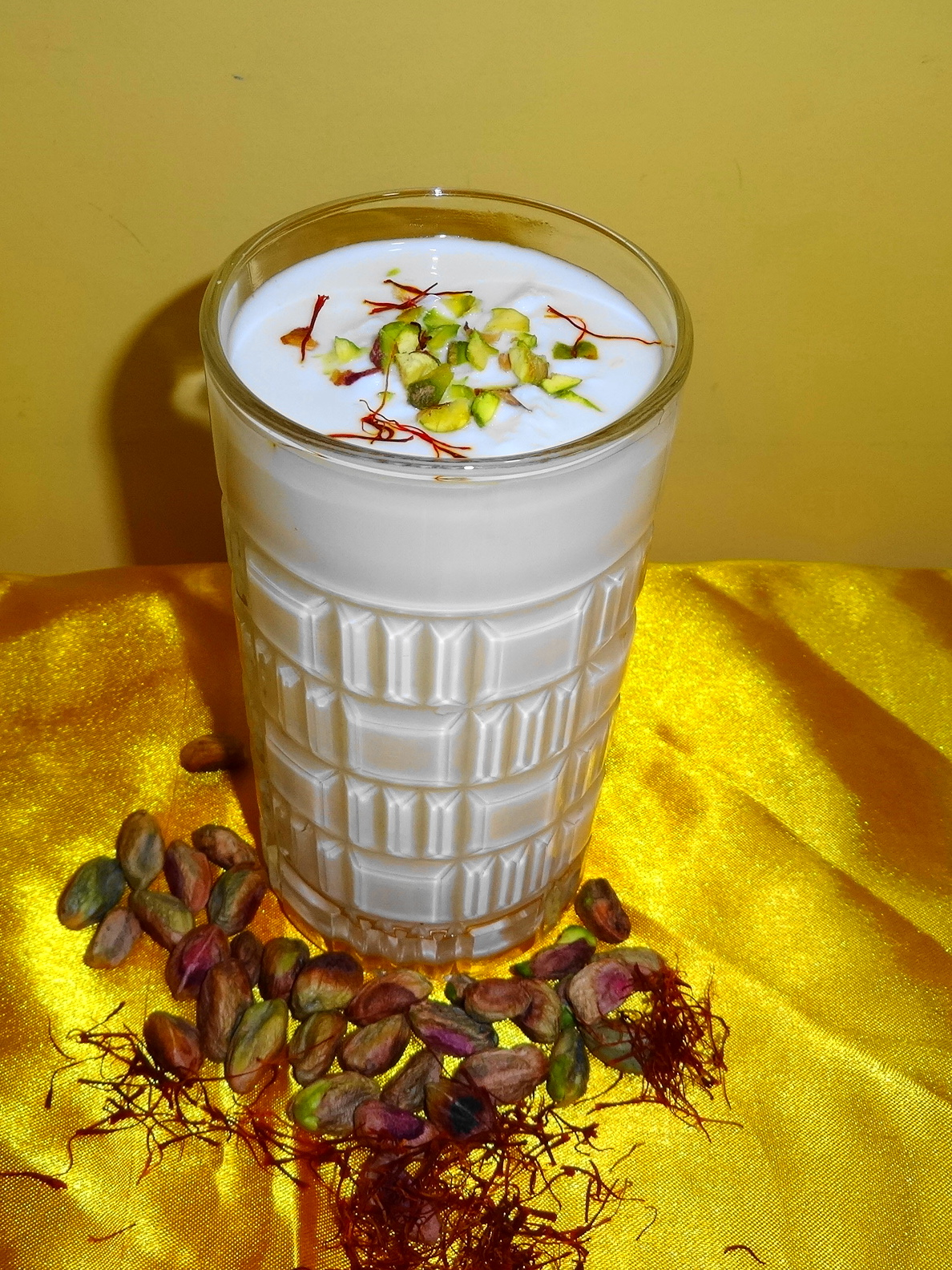
Patiala lassi

Sweets include firni or phirni (a sweet dish made of milk, rice flour, and sugar and chilled in earthenware bowls), gulab jamun and burfi. The desserts include fresh hot jalebi with vanilla ice cream, rasmalai and kesari kheer.

The saffron-mixed buttermilk (lassi) of Amritsar; milk boiled with almonds, pistachio, and dry dates in winter; and the same mix boiled into a thick liquid and then solidified in a banana-shaped mould in the form of a kulfi are desserts. Panjiri, a whole wheat flour fried in sugar and ghee, heavily laced with dry fruits and herbal gums, is eaten in the winters to ward off cold.

=== Regional variations ===
Haryana has dhabas all over, and dhabas in Murthal, Sonipat on Grand Trunk Road are famous for delicacies including murthal paratha, haryanvi daal, cheese bread pakora, and more. Garam dharam (hot dharam), a vegetarian dhaba based on a sholay theme in Murthal, Sonipat, with fruit parathas as one of its specialities, is owned by the Bollywood action hero Dharmendra.

== Overseas ==
The word has come to represent the cuisine of the Indian subcontinent so much that many Indian restaurants in Asia (Bangkok), Europe and the Americas (Trinidad and Tobago and the United States) have adopted it as a part of the name.

== See also ==
- Indian cuisine
- Pakistani cuisine
- Dabbawalas of Mumbai
- Cha chaan teng Hong Kong diners
- Greasy spoons
- Hawker centres of Singapore
- Kopi tiam in Southeast Asia
- Tapri in central and south India
- Truck stops in North America
- Kesar Da Dhaba
- Mamak stall of Malaysia and Singapore
