= Lohri =

Winter folk festival

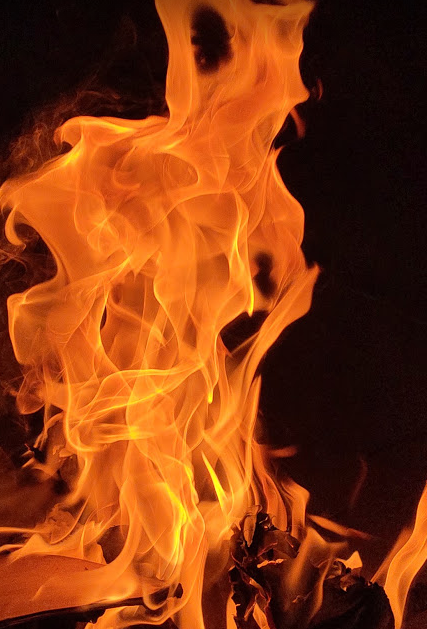
- Lohri bonfire
- Also called: Lal Loi
- Type: Religious, cultural, seasonal
- Significance: Midwinter festival, celebration of winter solstice
- Celebrations: Bonfire, songs and
- Date: 13 January
- Frequency: Once in a year
- Related to: Maghi, Makar Sankranti

Lohri (Lohṛī) is a midwinter folk and harvest festival that marks the passing of the winter solstice and the end of winter. It is a traditional welcome of longer days and the sun's journey to the Northern Hemisphere. It is one of the Indian harvest festivals observed on or near Makar Sankranti (in the month of Magha in the Indian calendar) and falls on the night before Maghi (in the month of Magh in the Punjabi calendar) which commonly falls on 13 January every year. It is celebrated primarily in the Punjab region of India and Pakistan and also other regions of northern India such as Duggar and Jammu in Jammu and Kashmir, Haryana and Himachal Pradesh. (Note: Quote: "Lohri is the winter festival of Punjab and is celebrated by both Hindus and Sikhs.")

Lohri is celebrated by Hindus, Sikhs, Christians and Muslims in India and is an official holiday in Punjab, India, Jammu and Himachal Pradesh. The festival is celebrated in Delhi and Haryana where it is not a gazetted holiday (Note: According to Saini (1968), "the advent of the displaced persons, from the West Punjab have introduced "Lohri" and "Baisakhi" etc. here"")

In Punjab, Pakistan, it is not observed at the official level but Hindus and Sikhs, and some Muslims observe the festival in rural Punjab and in the cities of Faisalabad and Lahore. In recent years, there has been the observance of the revival of Lohri in Punjab, Pakistan.

== Date ==
Lohri is celebrated one day before Maghi (Makar Sankranti) and its date is determined as per Hindu solar calendar. The date of Lohri changes every 70 years. In the late 19th-century, Lohri used to fall on 11 January. In the mid 20th-century, the festival used to be celebrated on 12 January or 13 January. In the 21st-century, Lohri generally falls on 13 or 14 January. Lohri in the year 2024 will fall on 14 January as Maghi will be falling on 15 January.

== History ==
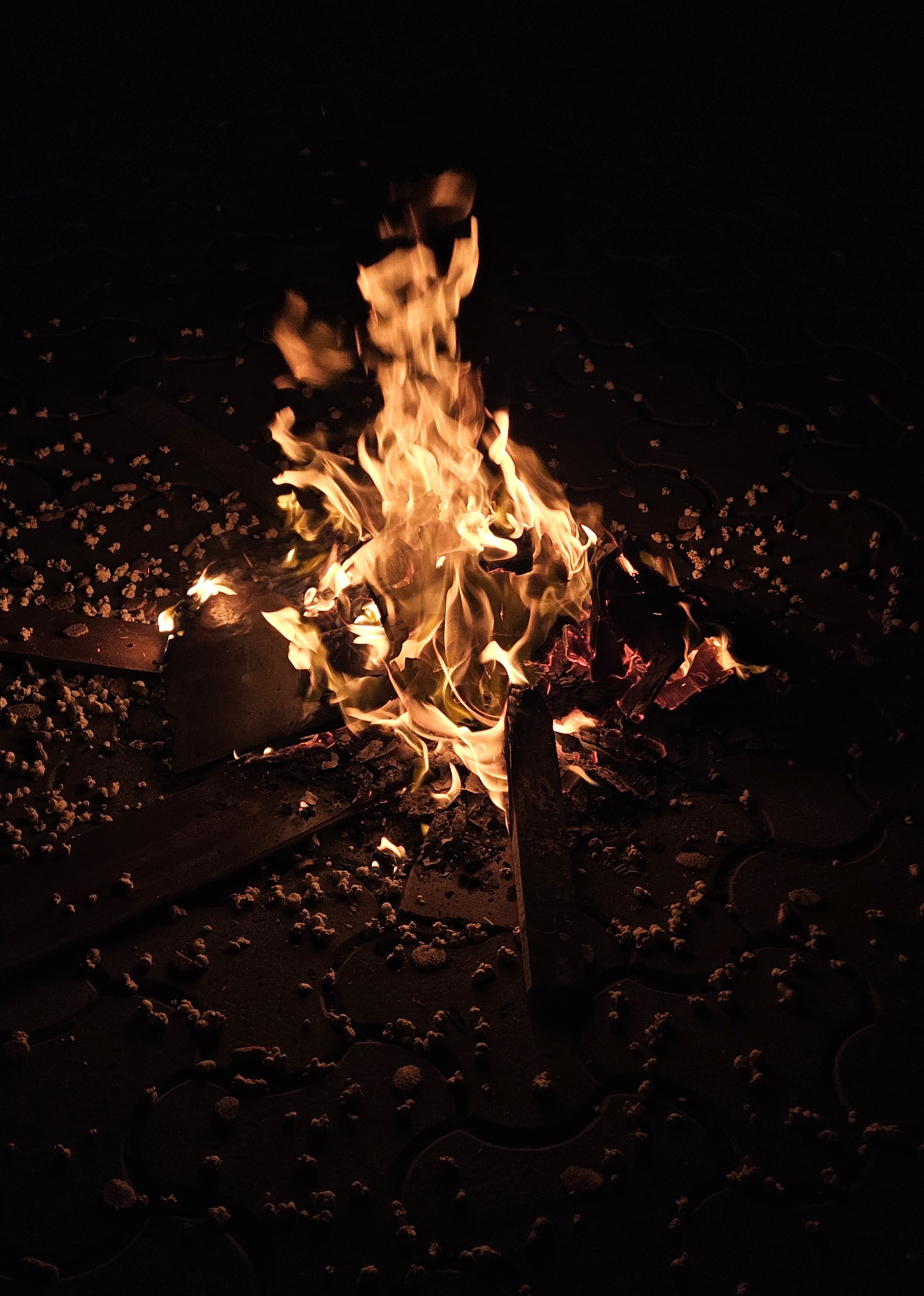
Lohri bonfire

Lohri is mentioned by European visitors to the Lahore Darbar of Maharaja Ranjit Singh, such as Wade who visited the Maharaja in 1832. Captain Mackeson described Maharaja Ranjit Singh distributing suits of clothes and large sums of money as rewards on Lohri day in 1836. The celebration of Lohri with the making of a huge bonfire at night is also noted in the royal court in 1844. Rose noted in 1907 that the first Lohri following a birth was celebrated by people giving away copper coins and cowries to the poor.

The accounts of Lohri celebration in royal circles do not discuss the origins of the festival. However, there is much folklore about Lohri. Lohri is the celebration of the arrival of longer days after the winter solstice. According to folklore, in ancient times Lohri was celebrated at the end of the traditional month when winter solstice occurs. It celebrates the days getting longer as the sun proceeds on its northward journey. The day after Lohri is celebrated as Makar Sankranti.

Lohri is an ancient mid-winter festival originating in regions near the Himalayan mountains where winter is colder than the rest of the Indian subcontinent. Hindus and Sikhs traditionally lit bonfires in their yards after the weeks of the rabi season cropping work, socialised around the fire, sang and danced together as they marked the end of winter and the onset of longer days.

== Significance ==
The ancient significance of the festival is it being a winter crop season celebration. A popular folklore in the Punjab region links Lohri to the tale of Dulla Bhatti. The central theme of many Lohri songs is the legend of Dulla Bhatti (Rai Abdullah Bhatti) whose father was a zamindar who lived in Punjab during the reign of Mughal Emperor Akbar. He was regarded as a hero in Punjab, for rescuing girls from being forcibly taken to be sold in slave markets of the Middle East. Among those he saved were two girls Sundri and Mundri, who gradually became a theme of Punjabi folklore. As a part of Lohri celebrations, children go around homes singing the traditional folk songs of Lohri with the "Dulla Bhatti" name included. One person sings, while others end each line with a loud "Ho!" sung in unison. After the song ends, the adult of the home is expected to give snacks and money to the singing troupe of youngsters. Lohri also marks the beginning of the harvest season and sunny days.

== Celebrations ==
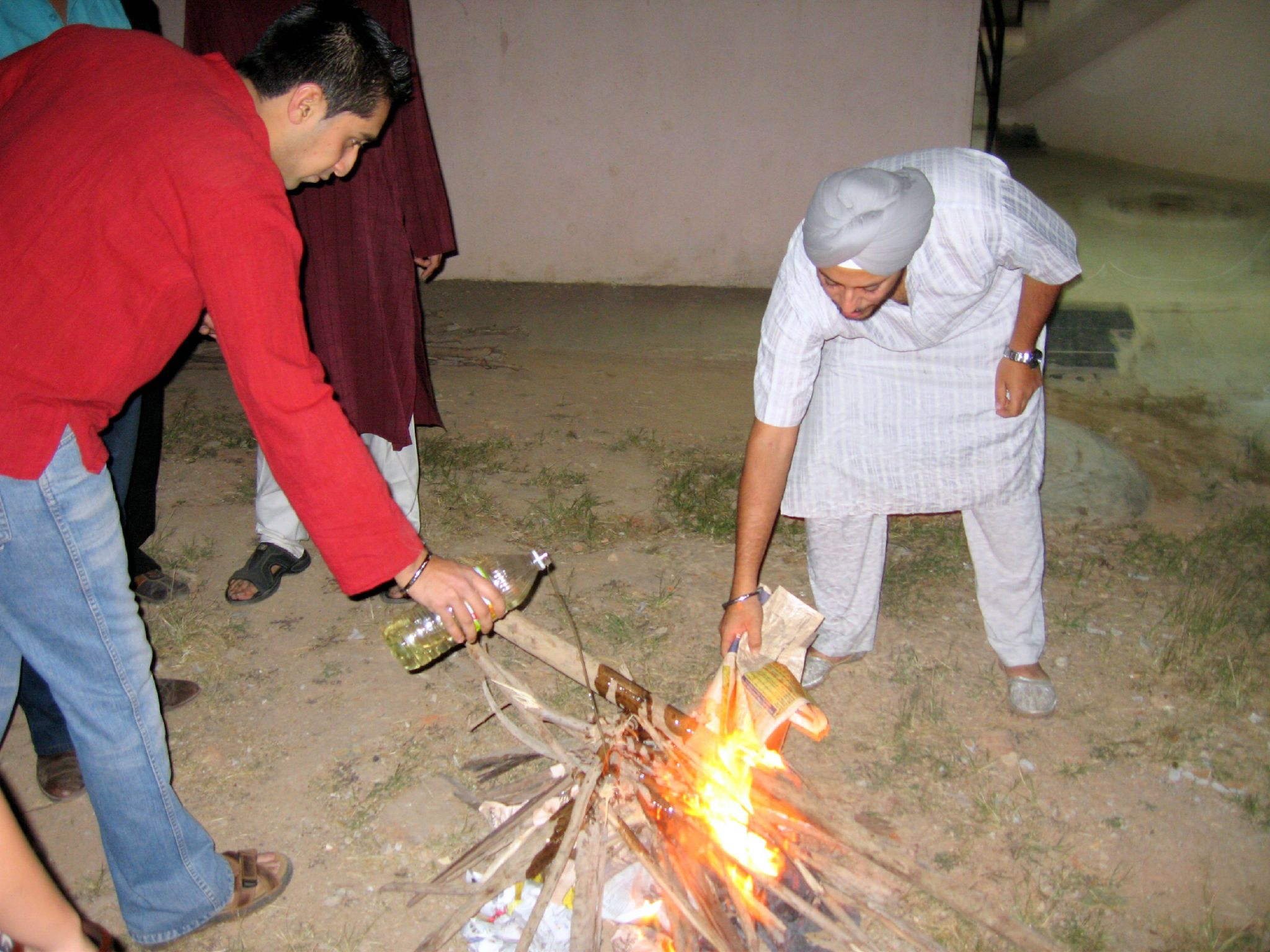
Bonfire being lit during the 2006 celebration of Lohri

The festival is celebrated by lighting bonfires, eating festive food, dancing and collecting gifts. In houses that have recently had a marriage or childbirth, Lohri celebrations will reach a higher pitch of excitement. Most North Indians usually have private Lohri celebrations, in their houses. Lohri rituals are performed, with the accompaniment of special Lohri songs.

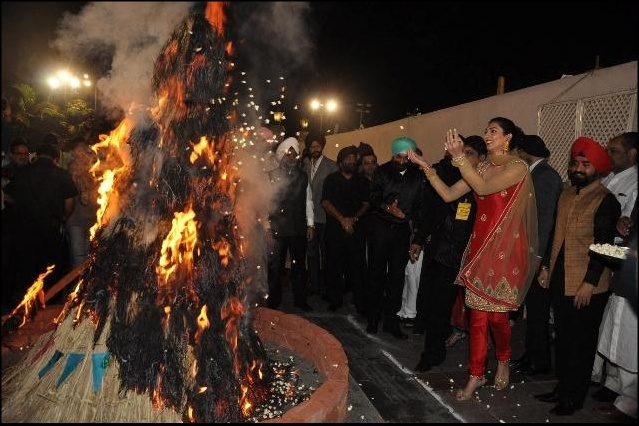
Dance performance during Lohri

Singing and dancing form an intrinsic part of the celebrations. In Punjab, people wear their brightest clothes and come to dance the bhangra and giddha to the beat of the dhol. Punjabi songs are sung, and everybody rejoices. Sarson da saag with makki di roti is usually served as the main course at a Lohri dinner. Lohri holds great importance for farmers. However, people residing in urban areas also celebrate Lohri, as this festival provides the opportunity to interact with family and friends.

=== Bonfire and festive foods ===
Lohri is celebrated with a bonfire. The lighting of bonfires during this winter festival is an ancient tradition. Ancient people lit the bonfire to reignite the return of longer days.

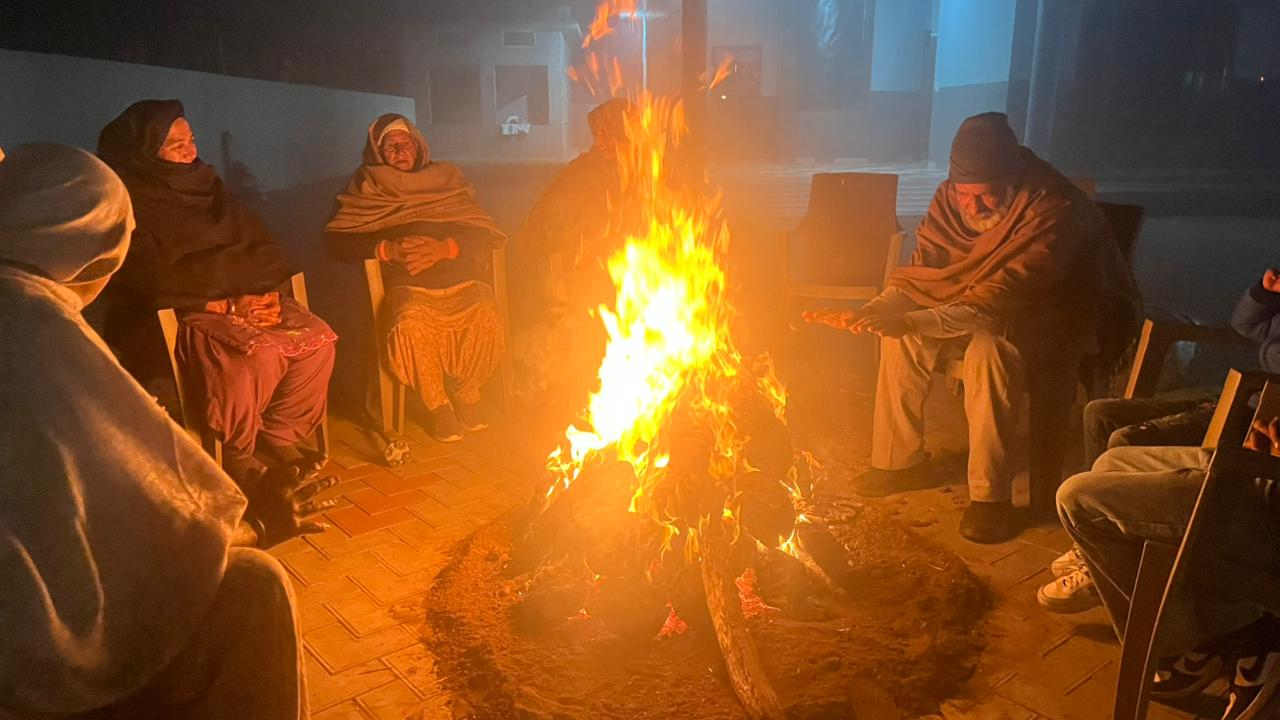
Lohri bonfire in Hollanwali, Punjab

In Punjab, Lohri is marked by eating sheaves of roasted corn from the new harvest. The January sugarcane harvest is celebrated in the Lohri festival. Sugarcane products such as jaggery and gajak are central to Lohri celebrations, as are nuts which are harvested in January. The other important food item of Lohri is radish which can be harvested between October and January. Mustard greens are cultivated mainly in the winter months because the crop is suitable to the agro-climatic conditions. Accordingly, mustard greens are also winter produce. It is traditional to eat gajak, sarson ka saag with makki ki roti, radishes, ground nuts and jaggery. It is also traditional to eat til rice, which is made by mixing jaggery, sesame seeds and puffed rice. In some places, this dish, more like a snack, is named tilcholi.

=== Chajja and Hiran dance ===
Lohri in Jammu is special because of various additional traditions associated with it like Chajja-making and dancing, Hiran dance, and preparing Lohri garlands. Young children prepare a replica of a peacock which is known as Chajja. They carry this Chajja and go from one house to other house celebrating Lohri. In and around Jammu, the special Hiran dance is performed. Selected houses which have auspicious ceremonies prepare eatables. Children wear special garlands made of groundnuts, dry fruits and candies on Lohri day. (Note: According to the Jammu Kashmir Government Portal: "Punjabi festivals such as Lohri and Vaisakhi are celebrated with great zeal and enthusiasm throughout the region, along with Accession Day, an annual holiday which commemorates the accession of Jammu & Kashmir to the Dominion of India")

=== Collecting Lohri items and trick–or–treating ===
In various places of Punjab, India about 10 to 15 days before Lohri, groups of young and teenage boys and girls go around the neighbourhood collecting logs for the Lohri bonfire. In some places, they also collect items such as grains and jaggery which are sold, and the sale proceeds are divided among the group.

In some parts of Indian Punjab, there is a popular trick–or–treat activity which is engaged in by boys. They select a group member and smear his face with ash and tie a rope around his waist. The idea is for the selected person to act as a deterrent for people who refrain from giving Lohri items. The boys sing Lohri songs asking for Lohri items. If not enough is given, the householder will be given an ultimatum to either give more or the rope will be loosened. If not enough is given, then the boy who has his face smeared will try to enter the house and smash clay pots or the clay stove.

=== Food ===
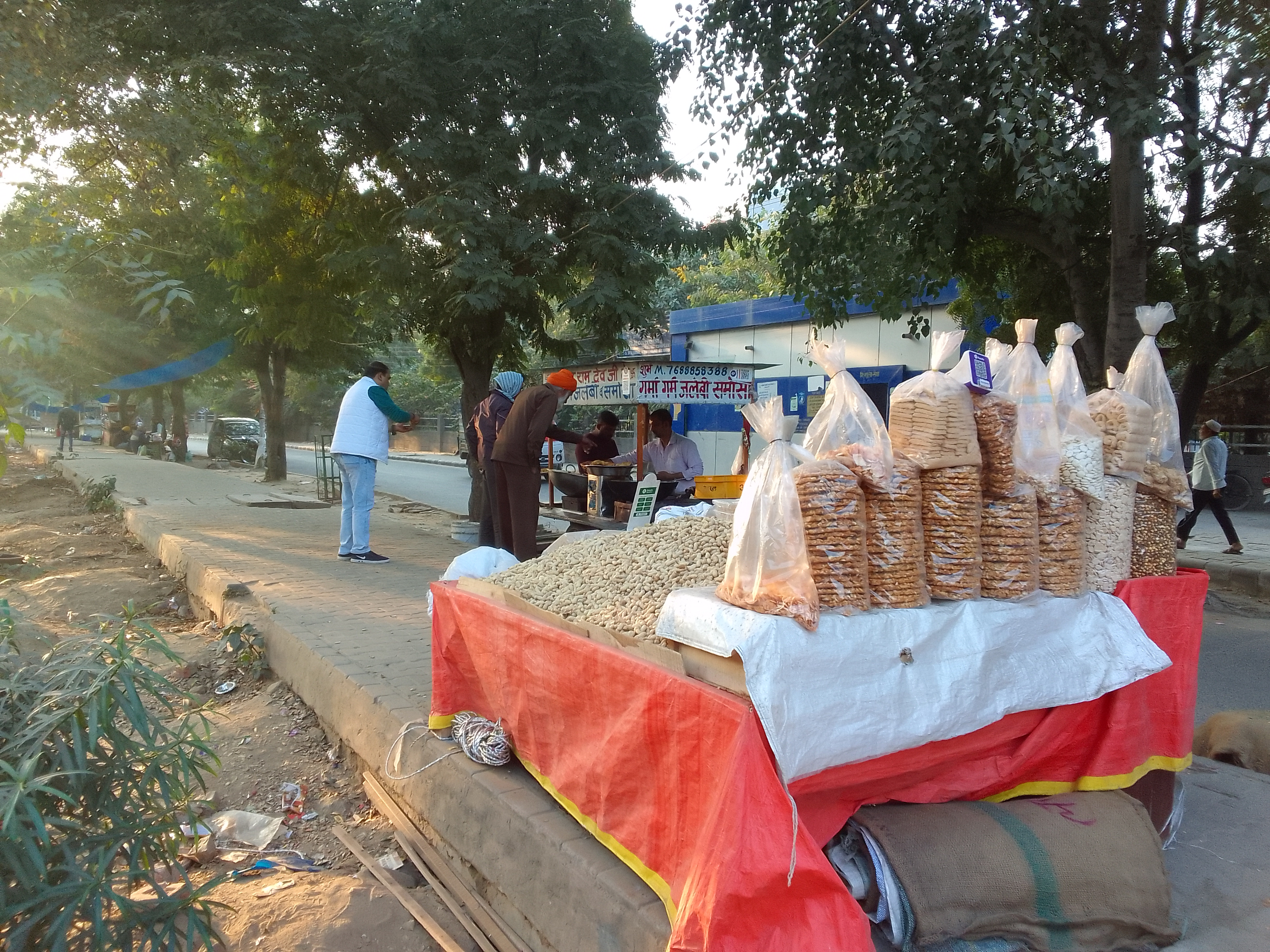
Dried fruit before the celebration of Lohri

During the day, children go from door to door singing songs and are given sweets and savouries, and occasionally, money. Turning them away empty-handed is regarded as inauspicious. Where families are welcoming newly-weds and newborns, the requests for treats increases.

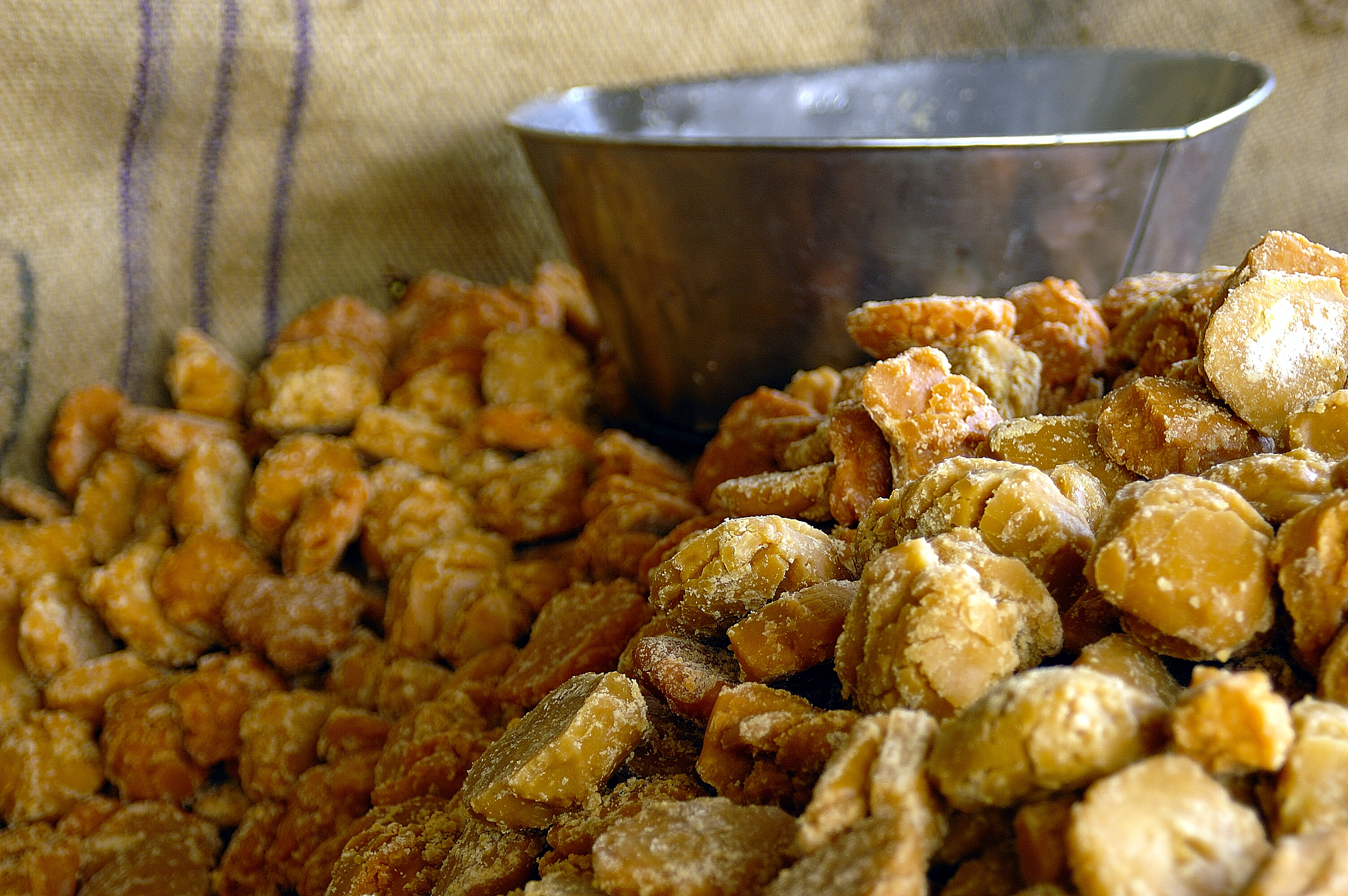
Gurh, solidified and unrefined sugarcane juice is a traditional festive sweet.

The collections gathered by the children are known as lohri and consist of sesame seeds, gajak, sugar candy, jaggery, peanuts and puffed rice or popcorn. Lohri is then distributed at night during the festival. Sesame seeds, peanuts, popcorn and other food items are also thrown into the fire. For some, throwing food into the fire represents the burning of the old year and start the next year on Makar Sankranti.

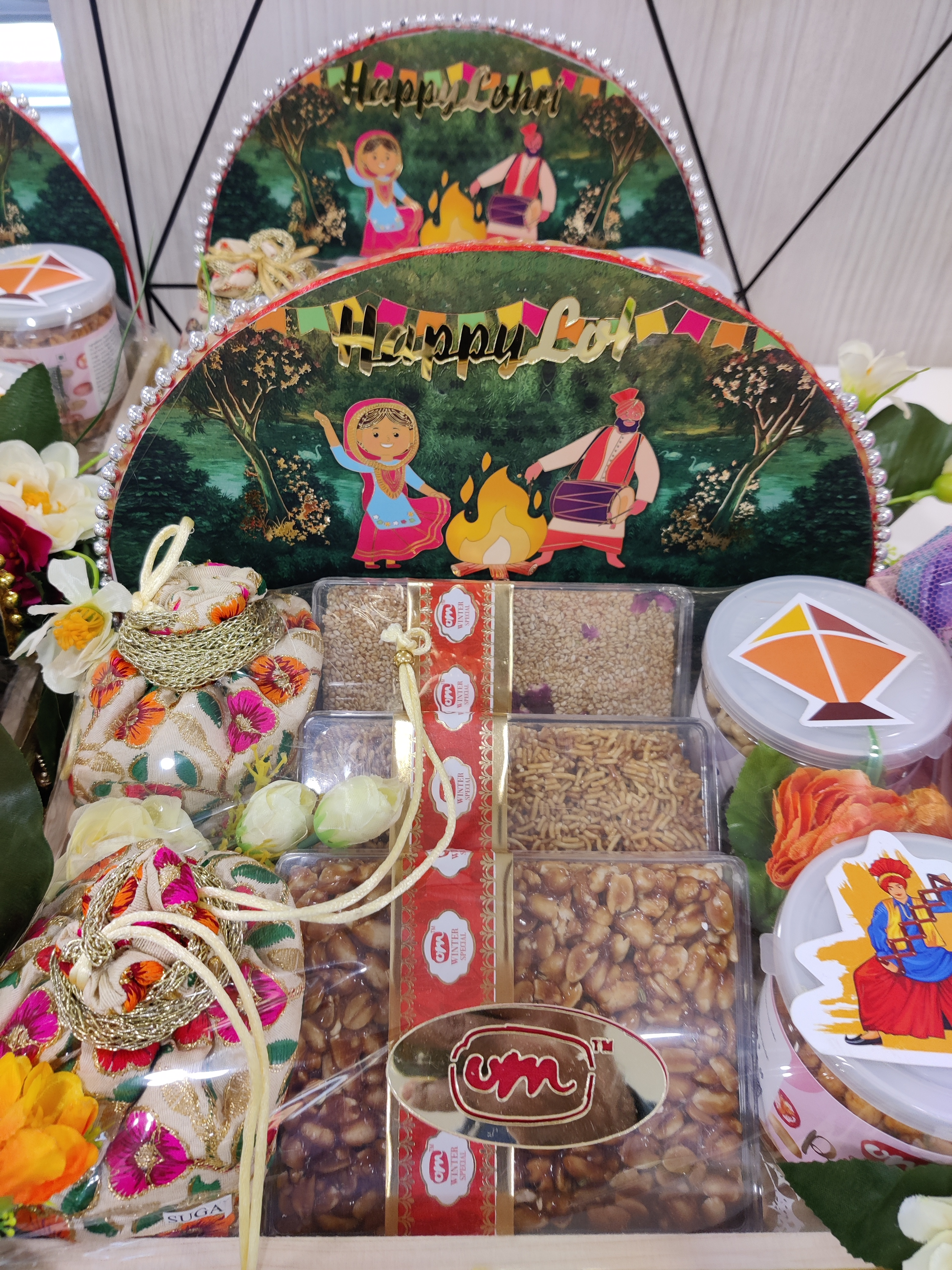
Lohri snacks and sweets

The bonfire is lit at sunset in the main village square. People toss sesame seeds, jaggery, sugar-candy and rewaries on the bonfire, sit around it, sing and dance till the fire dies out. Some people perform a prayer and go around the fire. This is to show respect to the natural element of fire, a tradition common in winter solstice celebrations. It is traditional to offer guests til, gajak, jaggery, peanuts and puffed rice or popcorn. Milk and water are also poured around the bonfire by Hindus to thank the Sun God and seek his continued protection.

== Pakistan ==
In recent years, there has been a concerted effort to revive the festival in Punjab, Pakistan. The first city celebration was held in Faisalabad in 2013. Since then Lohri has been celebrated in Lahore, Multan and Kasur. In addition to lighting bonfires and eating festive foods, the theme centres on Dulla Bhatti.

Among some sections of the Sindhi community, the festival is traditionally celebrated as Lal Loi. On the day of Lal Loi children bring wood sticks from their grandparents and aunties and light a fire burning the sticks in the night with people dancing and playing around the fire. The festival is gaining popularity among other Sindhis where Lohri is not a traditional festival.

== Lohri and the financial year ==
Historically, during the 19th-century, revenue for winter crops was collected either on Lohri or Maghi.

== Celebration area ==
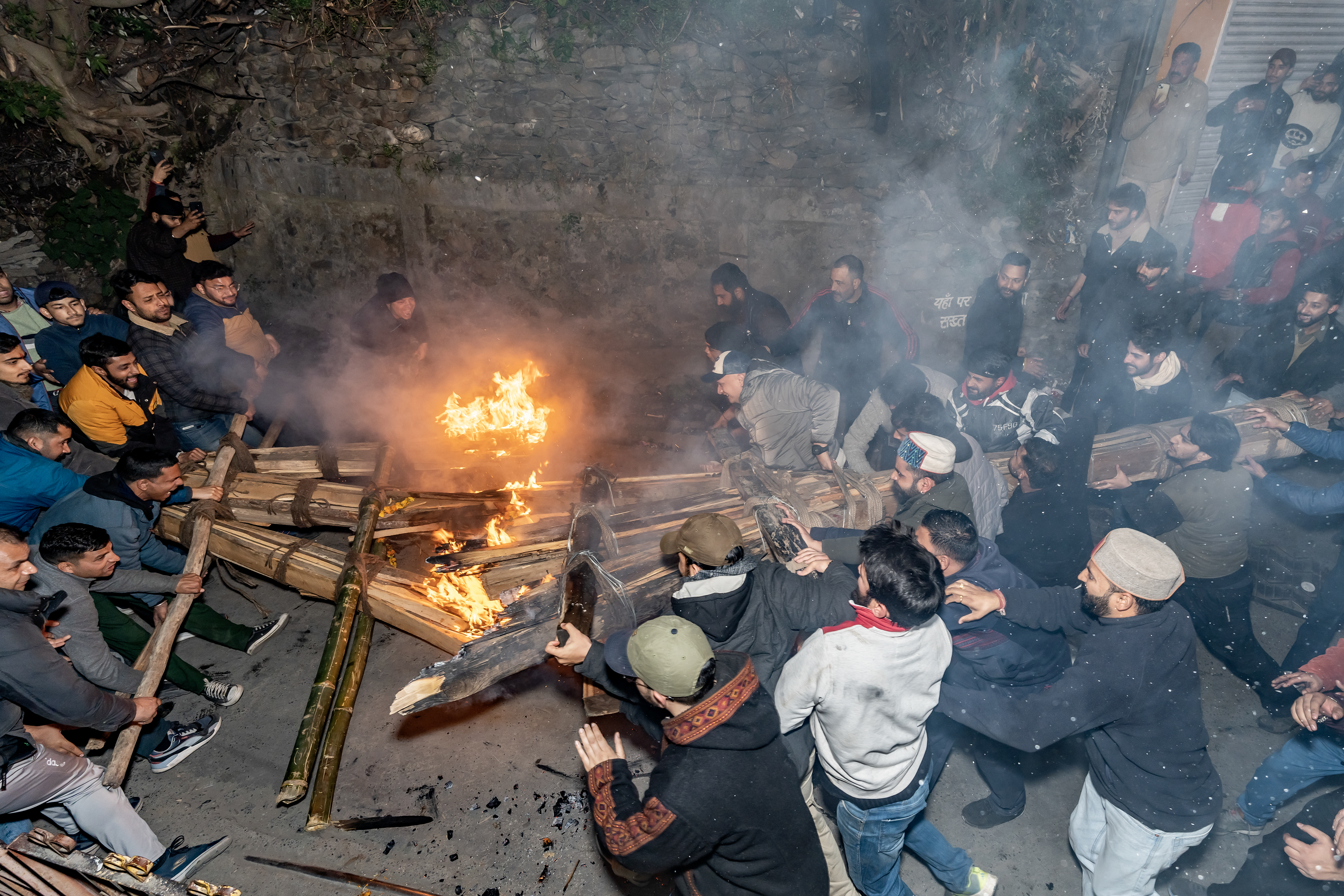
Lohri being celebrated in Himachal Pradesh

Lohri is celebrated to denote the last of the coldest days of winter. In India, the festival is celebrated in Delhi, Punjab, Haryana, Himachal Pradesh, and the Jammu region of Jammu and Kashmir since Mughal times. The festival is also observed as Lal Loi by the Sindhi community in India.

== Lohri songs ==
There are many Lohri songs. For example, the following song which has words to express gratitude to Dulla Bhatti (the 'ho's are in chorus):

Original Punjabi

Sunder mundriye ho!
Tera kaun vicharaa ho!
Dullah Bhatti walla ho!
Dullhe di dhee vyayae ho!
Ser shakkar payee ho!
Kudi da laal pathaka ho!
Kudi da saalu paata ho!
Salu kaun samete!
Chacha gali dese!
Chache choori kutti! zamidara lutti!
Zamindaar sudhaye!
Bum Bum bhole aaye!
Ek bhola reh gaya!
Sipahee far ke lai gaya!
Sipahee ne mari itt!
Paanvey ro te paanvey pitt!
Sanoo de de Lohri, te teri jeeve jodi!
(Laugh, cry or howl!)

Translation:
English translation

Beautiful girl
Who will think about you
Dulla of the Bhatti clan will
Dulla's daughter got married
He gave one ser of sugar!
The girl is wearing a red suit!
But her shawl is torn!
Who will stitch her shawl?!
The uncle made choori!
The landlords looted it!
Landlords are beaten up!
Lots of simple-headed boys came!
One simpleton got left behind!
The soldier arrested him!
The soldier hit him with a brick!
(Cry or howl)!
Give us Lohri, long live your pair (to a married couple)!
Whether you cry, or bang your head later!

== Related festivals ==
Lohri is a part of Indian harvest festivals which mark the winter solstice and are celebrated around Makar Sankranti. These include Makar Sankranti itself, Pongal (Tamil Nadu), Bhogi (southern India), Magh Bihu (Assam), Poush Sankranti (Bengal).

== Gallery ==
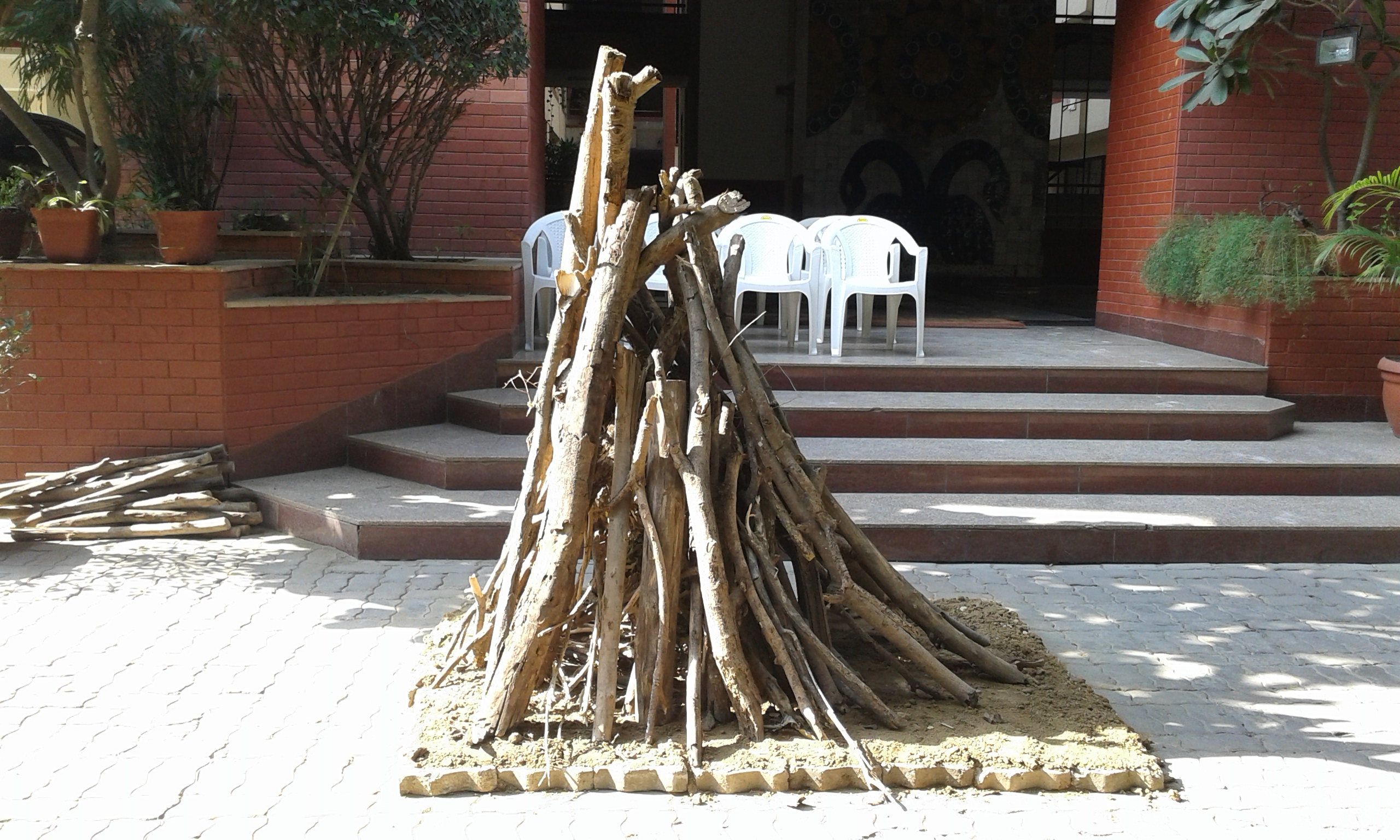
Lohri bonfire being prepared

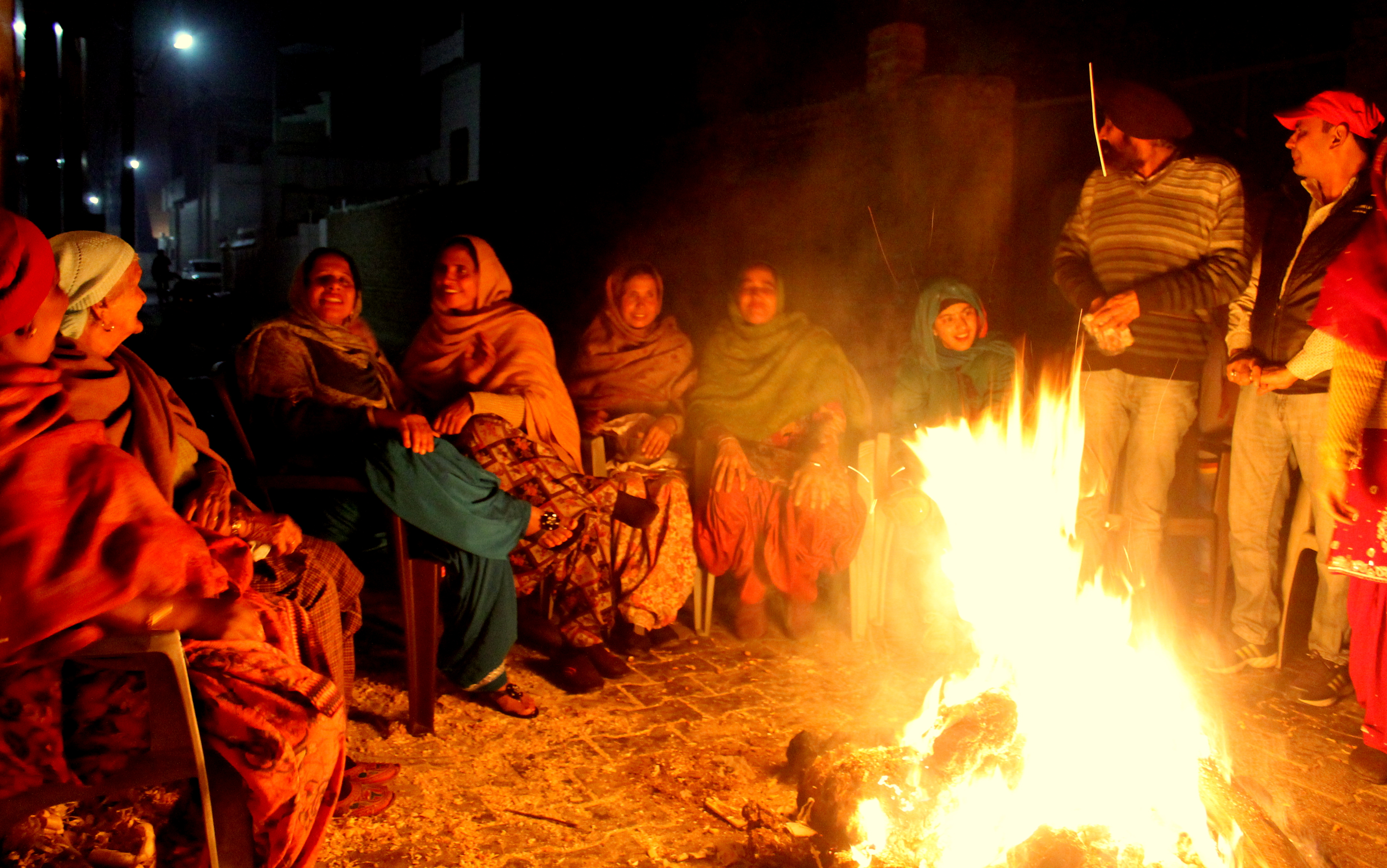
Lohri bonfire

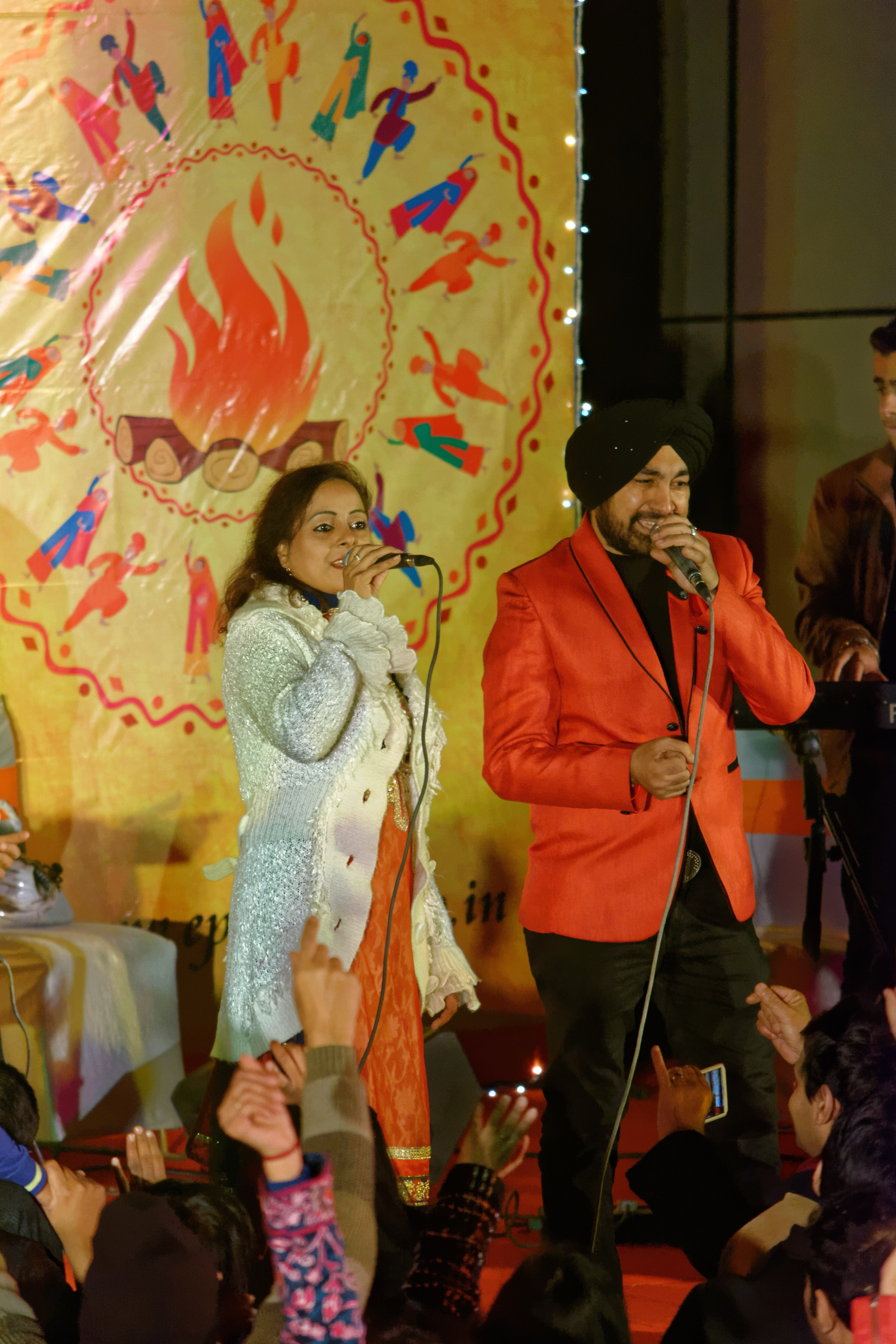
Lohri celebrations in Gurgaon

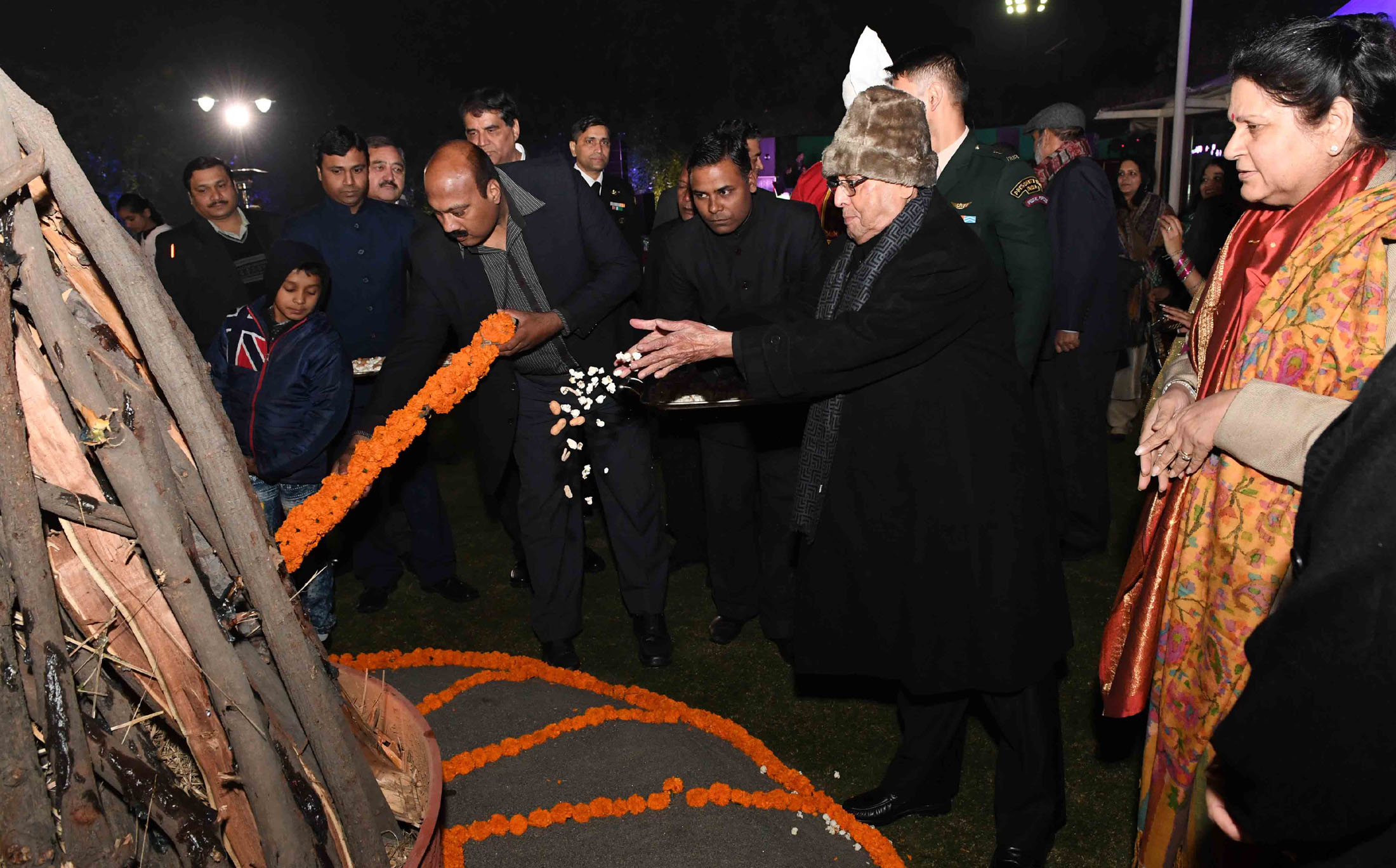
Indian president Pranab Mukherjee celebrating Lohri at Rashtrapati Bhavan, New Delhi on 13 January 2017

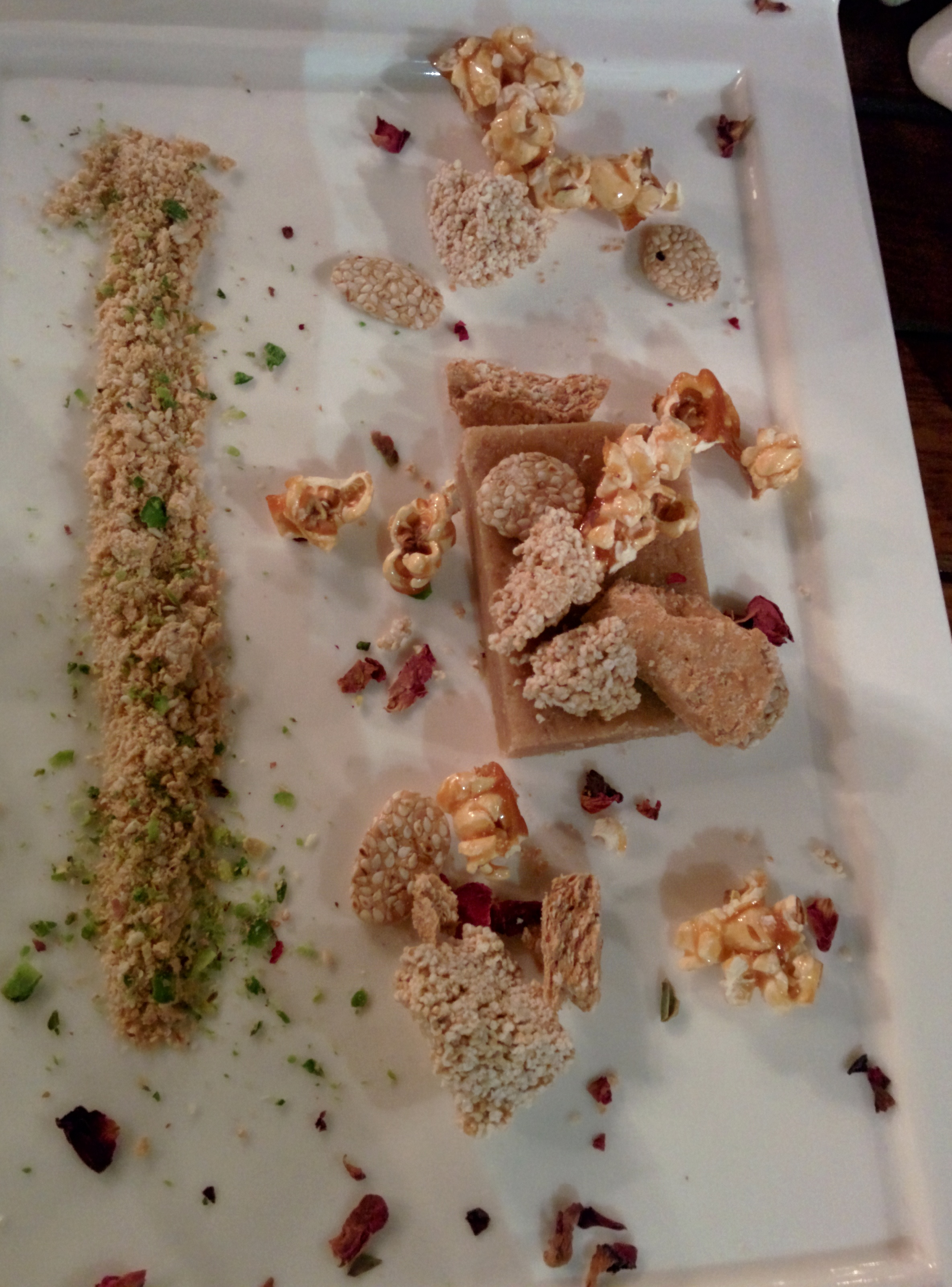
Lohri sweets

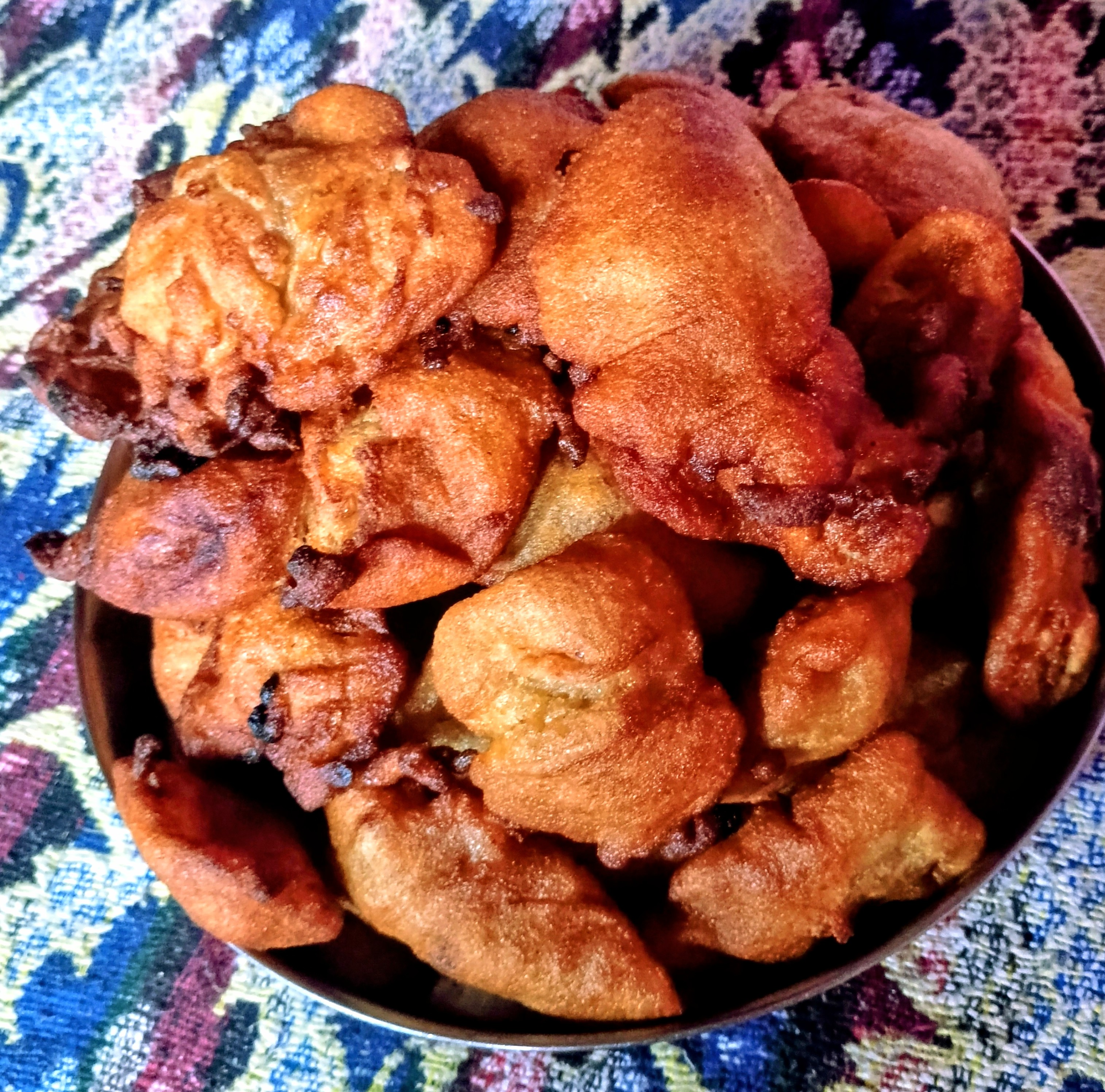
Bobaru, eaten the day after Lohri in Himachal Pradesh

== See also ==
- Sankranti
- Vaisakhi
