= Palak paneer =

Indian vegetarian dish with cheese

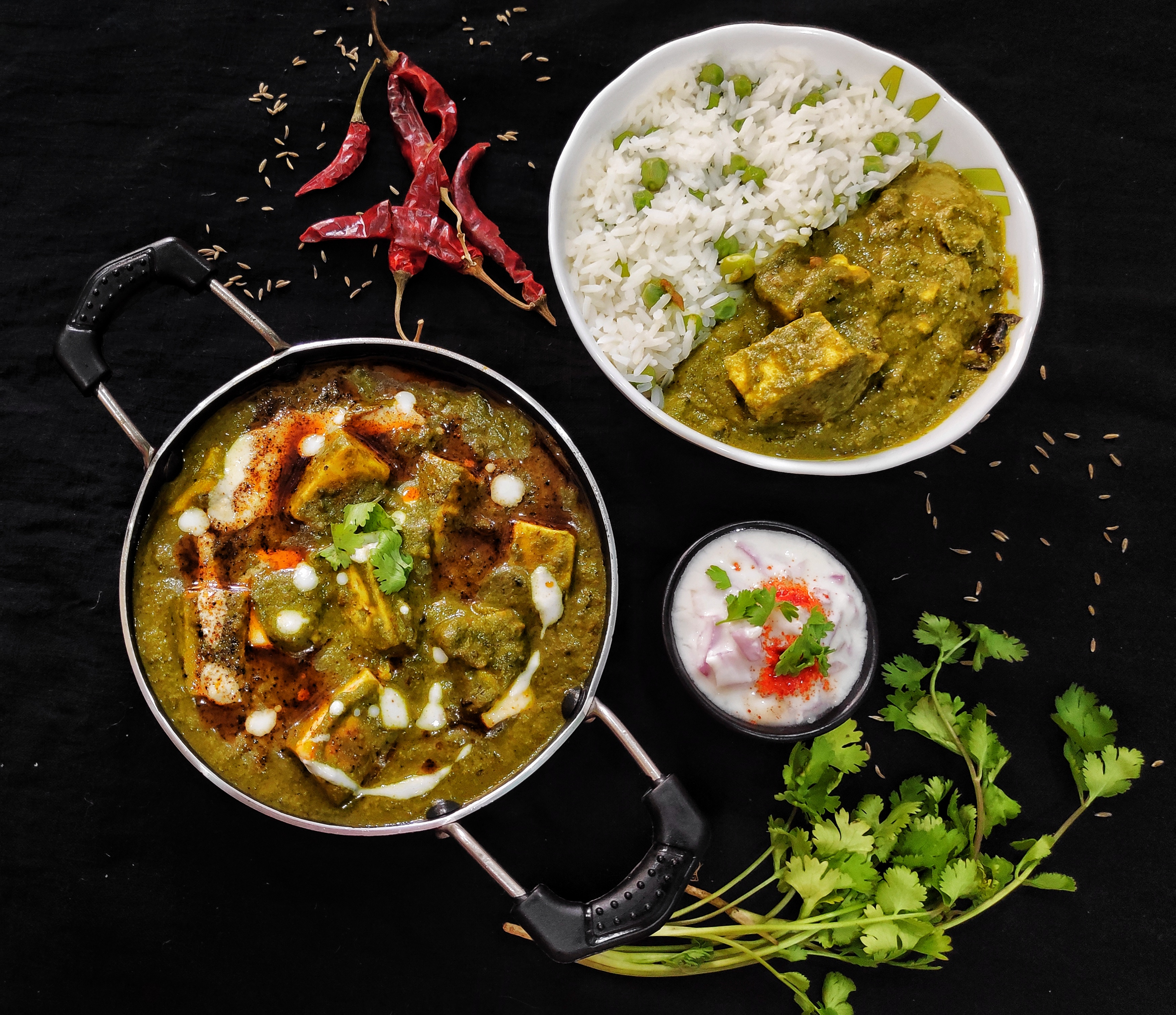
- Palak paneer, Indian cheese in a pureed spinach sauce
- Alternative names: Palak chhena
- Course: Main
- Place of origin: India
- Region or state: Indian subcontinent
- Serving temperature: Hot
- Main ingredients: Spinach, paneer/chhena, onions

Palak paneer (pronounced [paːlək pəniːɾ]) or palak chhena is a dish from the Indian subcontinent consisting of chhena or paneer in a thick paste made from puréed spinach, called palak in Hindi, Marathi, Gujarati, Punjabi and other Indian languages.

The terms palak chhena and saag chhena are sometimes used interchangeably in restaurants in the Anglosphere. However, saag chhena is different from traditional palak chhena in that it contains other green leafy vegetables, such as mustard greens, whereas palak paneer only contains spinach. Dhaba restaurants often specialize in palak chhena.

== Preparation ==
Palak paneer is prepared by first boiling and pureeing spinach. The puree is then mixed with sautéed tomatoes and onions. Grilled cubes of paneer are then added to the puree. Palak paneer is typically spiced with ginger, garlic, tomatoes, garam masala, turmeric, chili powder, and cumin.

== Serving ==
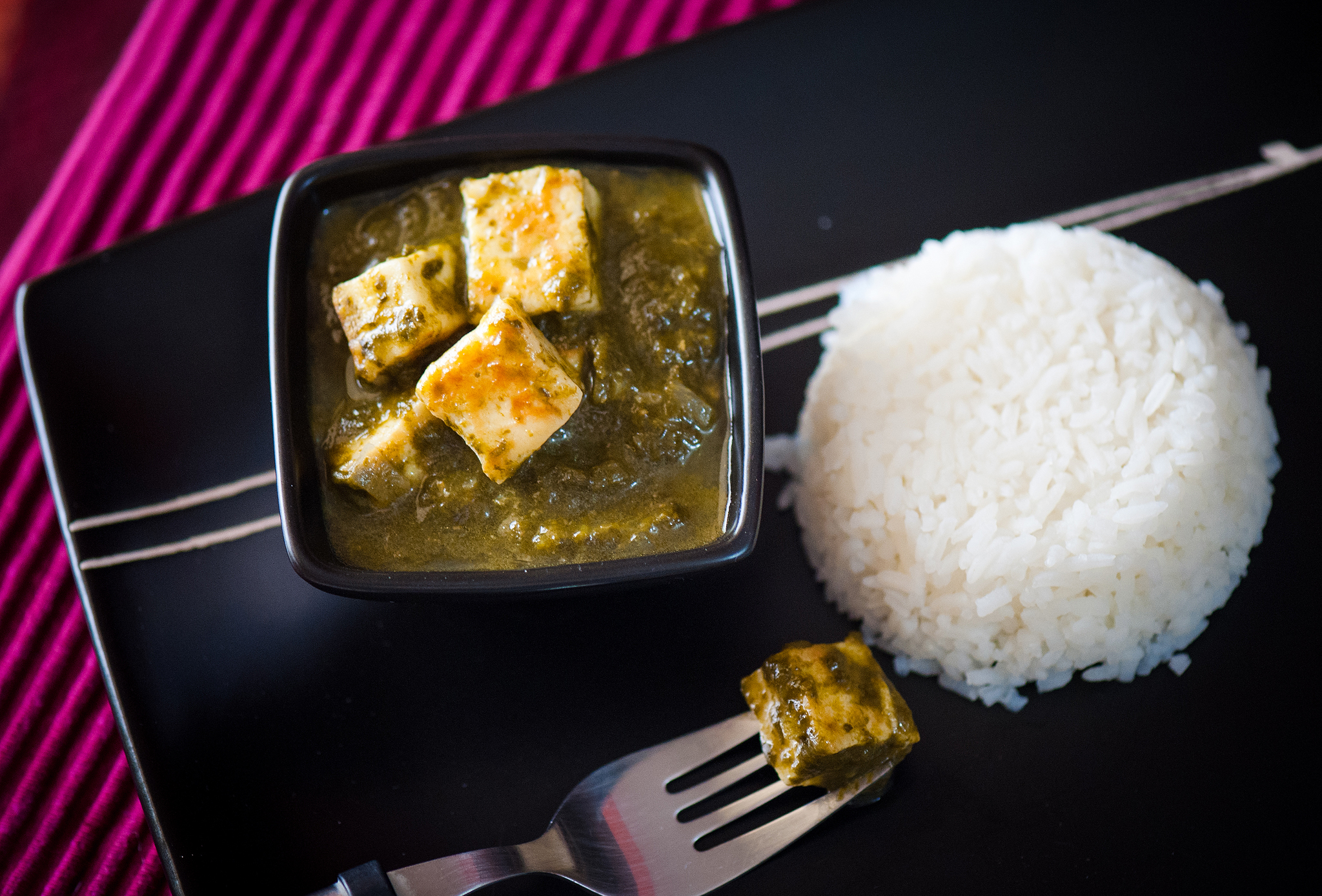
Palak paneer served with rice

Palak paneer is served hot with a side dish such as roti, naan, parathas, makki ki roti, or boiled rice. It can also be served with onions on the side for a more traditional approach.

Fusion variations of palak paneer have been offered. In July 2020, a Bangalore-based food blogger posted her variation of palak paneer idli. The dish sparked conversation on Twitter and Instagram about the unusual combination of these two North and South Indian dishes.

== See also ==
- Sarson ka saag
