= Bhogi =

First day of the Sankranti festival

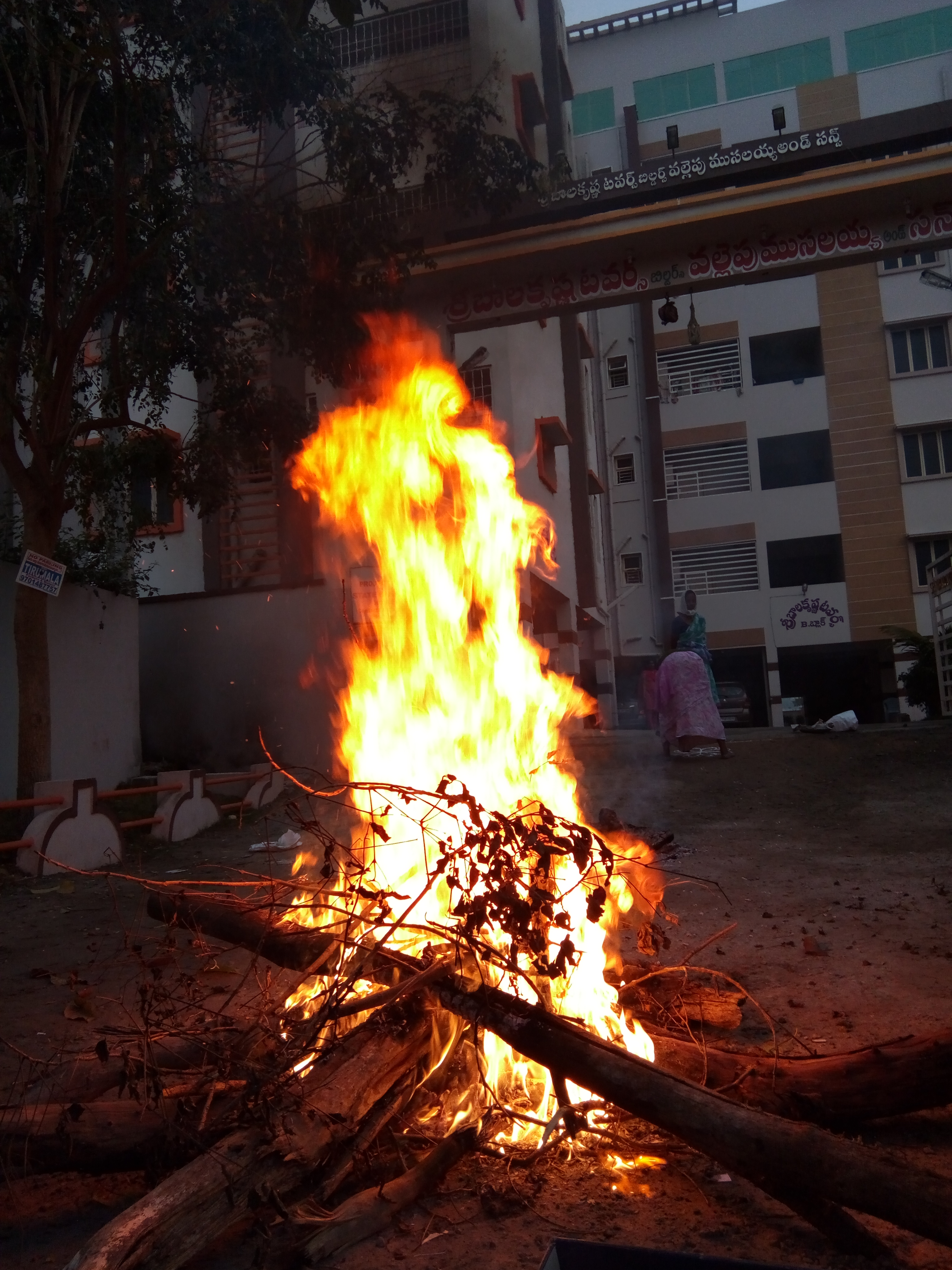
- Bhogi fire at Sri Balakrishna Towers, Gorantla, Guntur
- Official name: Bhogi
- Also called: Bhōgi, Lōhri
- Observed by: Hindus in North India, South India, Sri Lanka, Singapore, Malaysia, Indonesia, Australia
- Type: Seasonal, traditional
- Significance: Midwinter festival
- Celebrations: Bonfire
- Observances: Bonfire
- Date: Last day of Agrahayana month of Hindu calendar
- Duration: 1day
- Related to: Makar Sankranti; Bihu (Bhogali / Magh / Bhogi in Tamil, Telugu) lohri

Bhogi (Note: Kannada: ಭೋಗಿ, Telugu: భోగి, Tamil: போகி) is the first day of the four-day Sankranti festival. It falls on the last day of Agrahāyaṇa or Mārgaśīrṣa month of Hindu Solar Calendar, which is 13 January by the Gregorian calendar. It is the day before Makar Sankranti, celebrated widely in the Indian states of Andhra Pradesh, Telangana, Karnataka, Tamil Nadu, and Maharashtra.

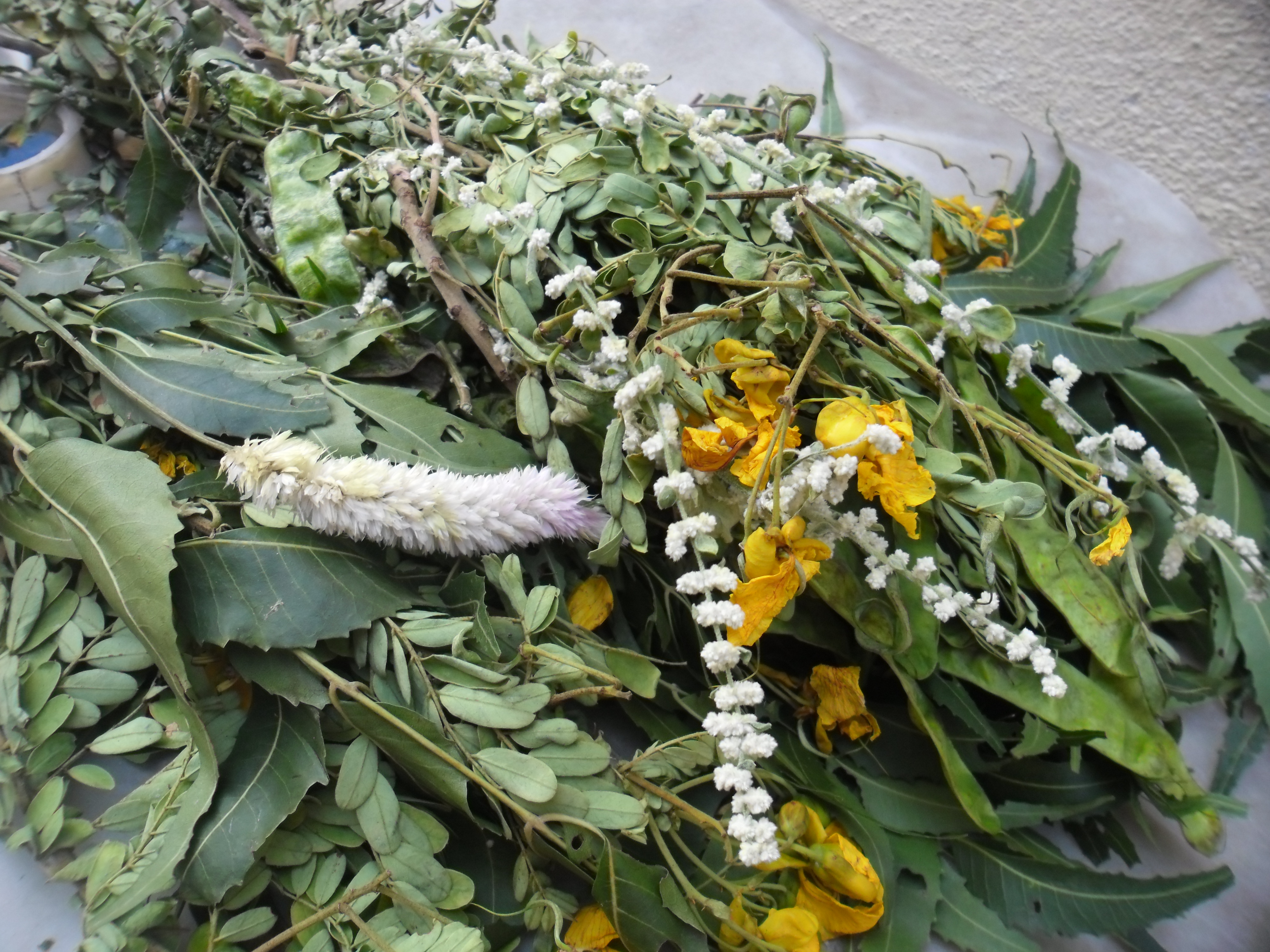
A picture of the Kaappu Kattu ritual that is practiced in Kongu Nadu houses.

On Bhogi, people discard old and derelict things and concentrate on new things causing change or transformation. At dawn, people light bonfires with logs of wood, other solid-fuels, and wooden furniture at home that are no longer useful. This marks the end of the year's accounts and the beginning of new accounts on the first day of the harvest on the following day. Lord Indra is worshipped during the Pongal festival for the blessing of rains.

== Observances ==
=== Bhogi ===
Bhogi is the first day of the four-day festival. It is celebrated with a bonfire with logs of wood, other solid-fuels, and wooden furniture at home that are no longer useful. In the evening, a ceremony called Bhogi Pallu, fruits of the harvest such as regi pallu and sugarcane are collected along with flowers of the season. Money is often placed into a mixture of treats and is poured over children. The children then collect the money and sweet fruits.

=== Pedda Panduga/Sankranti ===
The second and main day of the four-day festival, and is dedicated to the Hindu god Surya. The day marks the start of the Uttarayana, when the sun enters the 10th house of the zodiac Makara. It is commonly called as Pedda Panduga (Big festival) in the Andhra Pradesh state. Ariselu, a traditional sweet dish is offered to the god.

=== Kanuma ===
The third day of the four-day festival, it is dedicated to the cattle and other domestic animals. The cattle are decorated, especially cows, they are offered bananas, a special meal and worshipped. On this day, popular community sport Kodi Pandem will begun playing until the next one to two days, especially in the Coastal Andhra region of Andhra Pradesh.

=== Mukkanuma ===
It is the fourth and last day of the four-day festival. Many families hold reunions on this day.

== Kaappu Kattu ==
Kaappu kattu is a traditional practice observed in the Kongu region, wherein leaves of Azadirachta indica (Neem), Senna auriculata (Avaram), and Aerva lanata (Poolappu) tied along the roofs and walls of houses and residential areas. The term "Kaappu Kattu" originates from the Tamil word "kappu," meaning "to secure" or "to protect."

The primary objective of Kaappu Kattu is to ward off evil forces and malevolent spirits, thereby ensuring the protection and well-being of the inhabitants.

In Maharashtra, people eat roti made of Bajra sprinkled with til and mix vegetable gravy which includes palak, carrot, peas, green chana, papdi, etc.

== See also ==
- Lal Loi
- Lohri
- Pongal Festival
- List of Harvest Festivals
