= Lal Loi =

Sindhi term for Punjabi winter folk festival

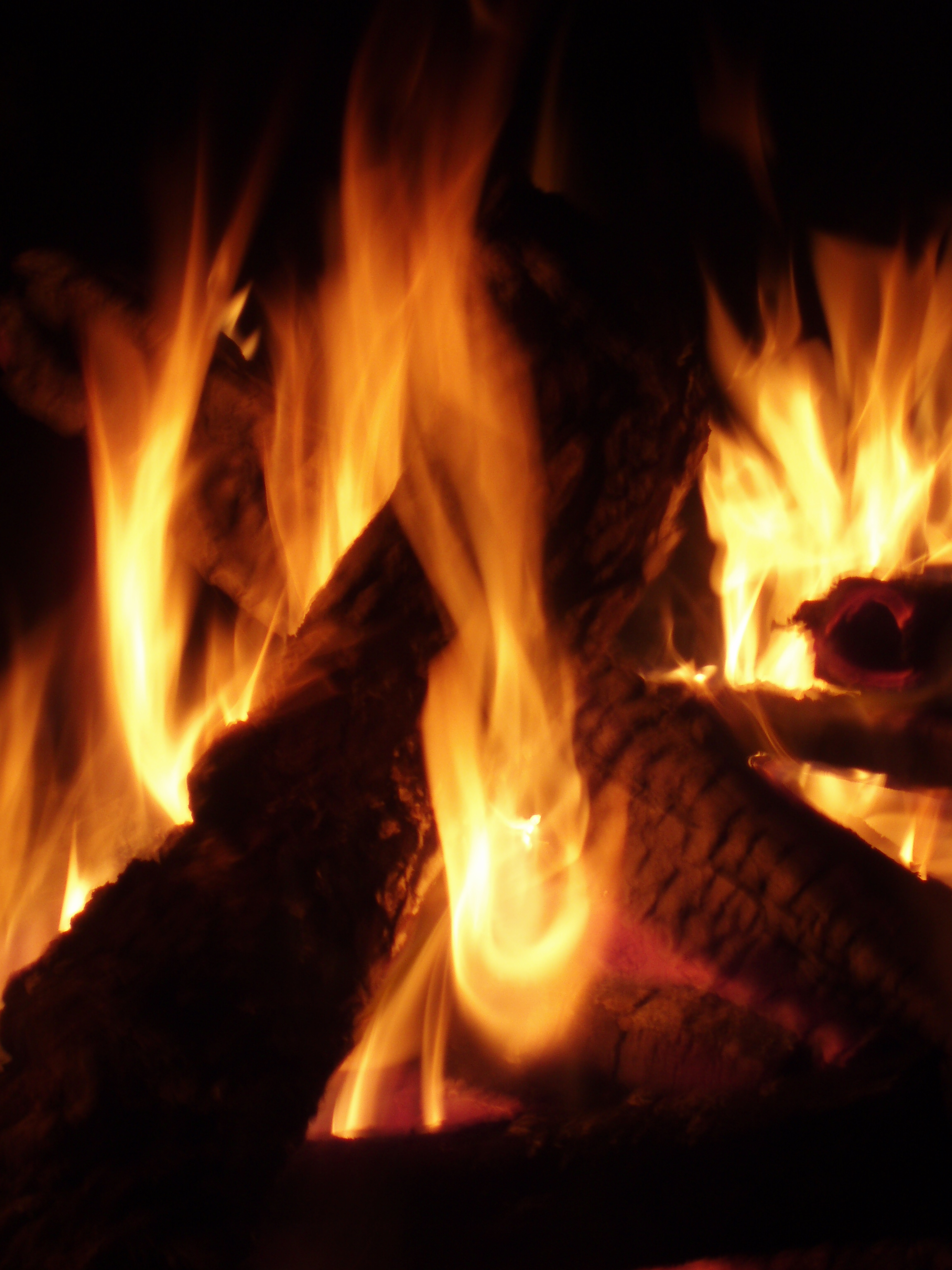
- Lal Loi Bonfire
- Type: Sindhi Hindu Religious festival
- Significance: Midwinter festival, celebration of Winter Solstice
- Celebrations: Bonfire, song and dance
- Date: 13 January
- Related to: Lohri, Bhogi

Lal Loi is the Sindhi term for the Punjabi winter folk festival of Lohri. It is celebrated in some parts of the Pakistani province of Sindh by the Hindus and also celebrated by Sindhi Hindus in India. On the day of Lal Loi children bring wood sticks from their grand parents and aunties and light a fire burning the sticks in the night with people enjoying, dancing and playing around the fire.

Sindhis believe that the focus of Lal Loi should be on getting rid of old belongings and cleansing the mind in readiness of the festival of Tirmoor which is observed the day after Lal Loi by all Sindhis. Tirmoor is the Sindhi name for Makar Sankranti. For Sindhis, Makar Sankranti means worshipping Lord Sun and flying kites.

According to some, not all Sindhis observe Lal Loi and the festival may have been observed by people of Upper Sindh where historically there has been inward migration from Punjab. It is however difficult to establish where Lal Loi was celebrated in Sindh or if it is observed there now. However, the Sindhis community in India celebrate Lal Loi annually where festivals are organised in places such as Indore where the festival is organised by the Sindhu Sabha, Mumbai and Udaipur.

In places where Sindhis and Punjabis live in the same city, joint Lal Loi/Lohri festivals are organised.

== See also ==
- Makar Sankranti
- Pongal
- Ahir
- Bhogali Bihu
- Sankranti
- Winter Solstice
- Lohri
