= Saag =

Leafy vegetable dish from the Indian subcontinent

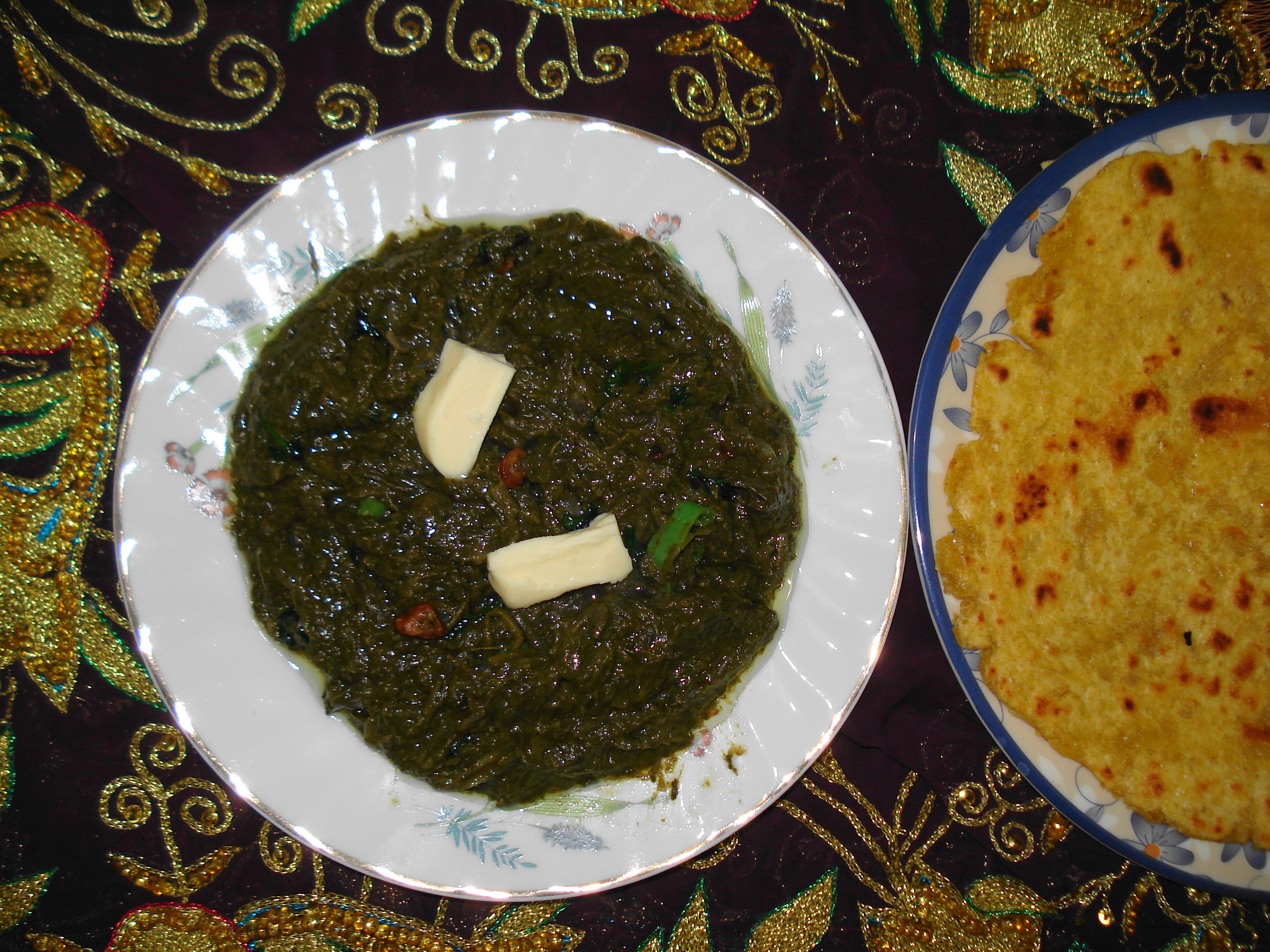
- sarson ka saag with makki ki roti
- Alternative names: Saaga or tuna (Odisha), shaag, shaak, saagwala
- Region or state: Bengal, Bihar, Haryana, Jharkhand, Odisha, Punjab, Sindh, Uttarakhand
- Main ingredients: Various kinds of edible plants

Saag, also spelled sag, saagh, saga, shaak or shak, is a leafy vegetable dish from the Indian subcontinent. It is eaten with bread, such as roti or naan, or in some regions with rice. Saag can be made from mustard greens, collard greens, basella or finely chopped broccoli along with added spices and sometimes other ingredients, such as chhena.

In India, it is common, especially in the state of Odisha, where it is eaten with pakhala. In the Shree Jagannath Temple of Puri, saag is one of the dishes offered to Jagannath as part of Mahaprasad. Saag is also common in West Bengal and other regions of North India, where the most common preparation is sarson ka saag (mustard plant leaves), which may be eaten with makki ki roti, a yellow roti made with maize flour. Saag gosht or hariyali maans (spinach and mutton) is a common dish in the state of Punjab. In Pakistan, it is most commonly eaten in the Punjab province along with Makki ki roti, made from freshly ground corn flour, and fresh buffalo or cow butter or ghee.

== Etymology ==
The word saag is derived from the Apabhraṃśa, Prakrit word 'sāgun' and Sanskrit word shaak (śāka) meaning leafy green vegetables.

== Variations ==
=== Odisha ===
In Odia cuisine, sāga (Odia: ଶାଗ) is one of the most important vegetables and a popular vegetable in the state. A large variety of plants are used as sāga in Odisha. A list of the plants that are used as sāga is as below.

- Kalama sāga (କଳମ ଶାଗ): Ipomoea aquatica (water spinach)
- Kosalā/Khadā sāga (କୋସଳା ଶାଗ/ଖଡା ଶାଗ): prepared from amaranth leaves.
- Bajji sāga (ବଜ୍ଜୀ ଶାଗ): prepared from Amaranthus dubius leaves.
- Leutiā sāga (ଲେଉଟିଆ ଶାଗ): Amaranthus viridis leaves and tender stems.
- Pālanga sāga (ପାଳଙ୍ଗ ଶାଗ): spinach
- Sāga chhena (ସାଗ ଛେନା): greens, especially spinach, with cottage cheese

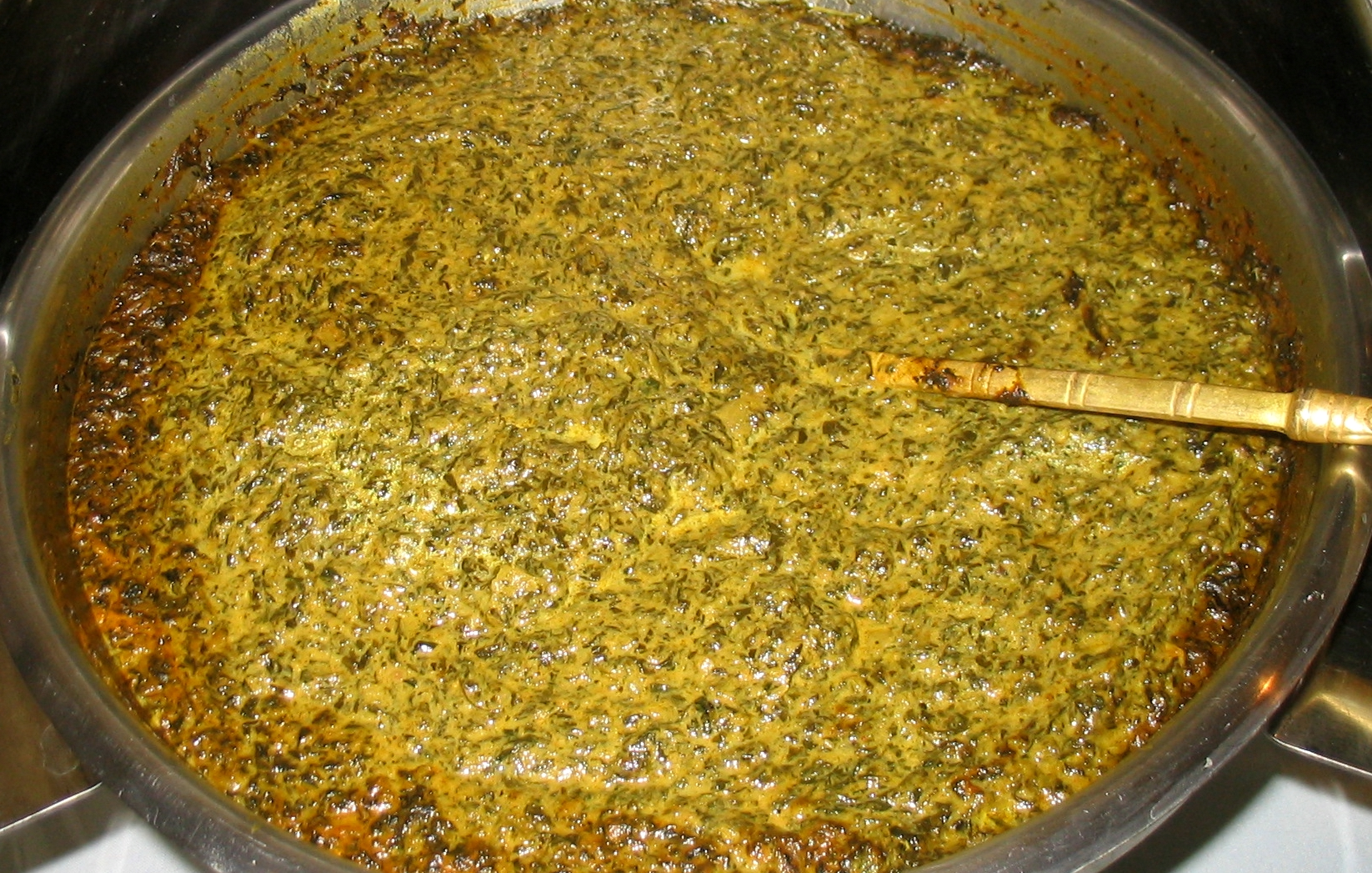
Saag Chhena, a spinach-based curry dish

- Poi sāga (ପୋଈ ଶାଗ): prepared from basella leaves and tender stems.
- Bāramāsi/sajanā sāga (ବାରମାସି/ ସଜନା ଶାଗ): prepared from leaves of the drumstick tree. Cooked with lentils or alone with fried onions.
- Sunusuniā sāga (ସୁନୁସୁନିଆ ଶାଗ): Marsilea polycarpa leaves.
- Pitāgama sāga (ପିତାଗମା ଶାଗ): Glinus oppositifolius.
- Pidanga sāga (ପିଡଙ୍ଗ ଶାଗ)
- Kakhāru sāga (କଖାରୁ ଶାଗ): prepared from leaves of the pumpkin plant.
- Madarangā sāga (ମଦରଙ୍ଗା ଶାଗ): prepared from leaves of Alternanthera sessilis.
- Sorisa sāga (ଶୋରିସ ଶାଗ): mustard greens
- Methi sāga (ମେଥୀ ଶାଗ): prepared from methi or fenugreek leaves and besara (mustard paste) cooked with vegetable.
- Matara sāga (ମଟର ଶାଗ): The inner coating of peas is removed and then chopped to make the saga.
- Bahal sāga
- Kular sāga
- Bhader sāga
- Jhirel dal sāga

=== Bengali ===
In Bengali cuisine, sāg is one of the most important vegetables, being popular throughout the state. Most Bengalis eat at least one dish containing sāg at lunchtime every day - usually fried or accompanied by a little gravy (jhol) and served with rice. A list of the plants that are used as sāg is as below.

- Kalmi sāg Ipomoea aquatica (water spinach)
- Kosalā/khadā sāg: prepared from amaranth leaves.
- Bajji sāg: Prepared from Amaranthus dubius leaves.
- Leutiā sāg Amaranthus viridis leaves and tender stems.
- Pālong sāg: spinach
- Puin sāg : prepared from basella leaves and tender stems.
- Bāramāsi/sojnā sāg: prepared from leaves of the drumstick tree. Cooked with lentils or alone with fried onions.
- Sunusuniā sāg: Marsilea polycarpa leaves.
- Pitāgama sāg
- Helencha sāg: Enhydra fluctuans
- Daata sāg
- Peyanj sāg: prepared from spring onions
- Mulor sāg
- Lal sāg: Prepared from Amaranthus tricolor leaves and tender stems.
- Lau sāg: Prepared from the leaves and stems of bottle gourd plant.
- Kumro sāg: Prepared from leaves of the pumpkin plant.
- Madarangā sāg: prepared from leaves of Alternanthera sessilis.
- Sorshe sag: Mustard greens
- Methi sāg: prepared from methi or fenugreek leaves and besara (mustard paste) cooked with vegetable.
- Matara sāg: The inner coating of peas is removed and then chopped to make the sāga.

=== Bihar ===
- Kalmi saag
- Munga saag
- Koira Saag
- Gandhari saag
- Koinar saag
- Chakod saag
- Sarla saag
- Chench saag
- Chimti saag
- Katai saag
- Dhhahdhhaa saag
- Golgola saag
- Khesaari saag (Lathyrus sativus)
- Poi saag (Basella alba)
- Palak saag (Spinach)
- Bathua saag (Chenopodium album)
- Methi saag (Fenugreek)

=== Jharkhand ===
There are around 70 varieties of saag in Jharkhand. Some are as follows:

- Beng saag
- Bhaji saag
- Kalmi saag
- Khesari saag
- Kohnda saag
- Koinar saag
- Methi saag
- Munga saag
- Palak saag
- Pechki saag
- Poi saag
- Putkal saag
- Sarla saag

=== Uttarakhand ===
Saags (Leafy greens) are an important part of the Garhwali, Kumaoni and Jaunsari cuisines of Uttarakhand. The abundance of leafy greens in the state is because of fertile land and forested land. Saags of Sarson (Mustard), Palak (spinach), Mooli (Radish) are common but exclusive saags cooked in the state are:

- Kandali saag / Bicchu ghas ka saag / Sisun ka saag - saag prepared from young leaves of the stinging nettle weed. First the leaves are boiled in water, rendering their stinging hairs harmless, before grinding them into a paste and cooking with ghee, tomato and spices to flavour them. Nettle leaves so prepared are highly nutritious, containing essential minerals and large amounts of protein
- Lingdi ka saag: made using tender fern leaves.

=== Haryana ===
- Saag gosht or Hariyali Maans is a version of the dish prepared with meat often of mutton or lamb. This version of the dish is more common in the state of Haryana. The meat is usually cooked in a Bhatthi (clay oven) before being marinated in the other ingredients.

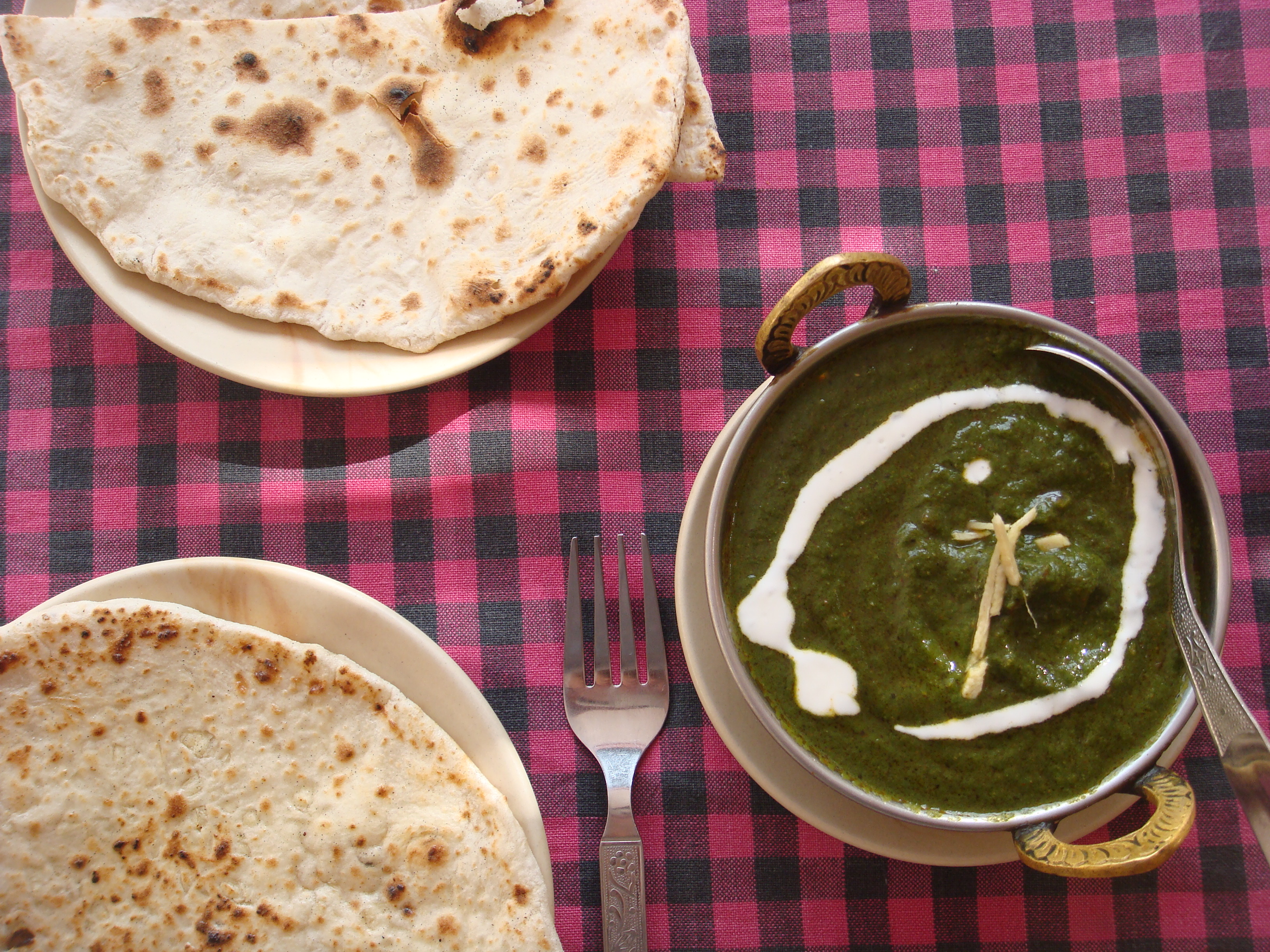
Saag Maans or Hariyali Maans with Roti

- In winters, saags of Channa/Cholia (chickpea leaves), Sarson (mustard), Methi (fenugreek), Palak (spinach), Bathua (chenopodium) are commonly cooked in Haryanvi households. These saags are mainly eaten with millet breads like Makki ki roti & Bajra ki roti, smeared with ghee or butter.

=== Punjab ===
- Saag is usually made with mustard leaves in Punjab, although spinach is common in other parts of the world. Saag is commonly served hot, usually with roti (wheat bread), chapati, makki ki roti, bajra ki roti and topped with clarified butter.

== See also ==
- Ghormeh sabzi
- Palak paneer
- Namul
