= Sarson ka saag =

South Asian dish

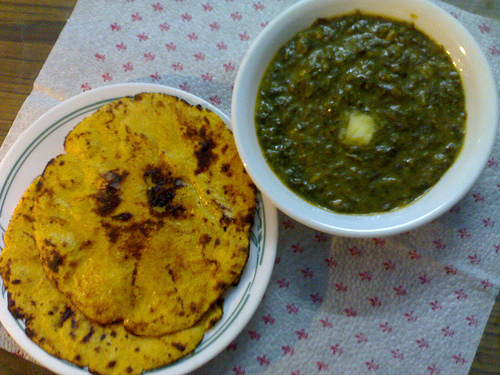
- Makki ki roti with sarson ka saag
- Alternative names: Sarsan da saag; sareyan da saag (Punjabi)
- Course: Main course
- Place of origin: Punjab
- Region or state: Punjab, Jammu, Himachal Pradesh, Gujarat, Mithila
- Associated cuisine: India, Pakistan
- Main ingredients: Mustard leaves

Sarson ka saag, also known as sarsa da saag and saron da saag, is a dish of mustard greens cooked with spices. It originated in the Indian subcontinent and is well known throughout the region.

== Name ==
The dish is known as sarson ka saag in Hindi and Urdu, saron da saag (or sareyan da saag) in Punjabi, and sariso saag in Maithili.

Sarson, sarhon, sareyan, and other names are derived from the Sanskrit word sarṣapa, 'mustard'. Saag and shaak are derived from the Sanskrit word śāka, 'greens; vegetable leaves'.

== Ingredients and preparation ==
Mustard is widely grown in the region for the plant's leaves, seeds and seed oil. It is harvested in winter and spring, making sarson ka saag a frequently served warming dish in the cooler months.

There are many recipes for the dish, usually calling for the leaves to be cooked in oil or clarified butter (ghee) with spices such as garlic, ginger and chilli. Other spices may be used, varying according to region and taste.

== Accompaniments ==
The dish is often served with bread such as makki ki roti or bajra ki roti.

== See also ==
- Palak paneer
- Saag
