= Makki ki roti =

Cornmeal flatbread from South Asia

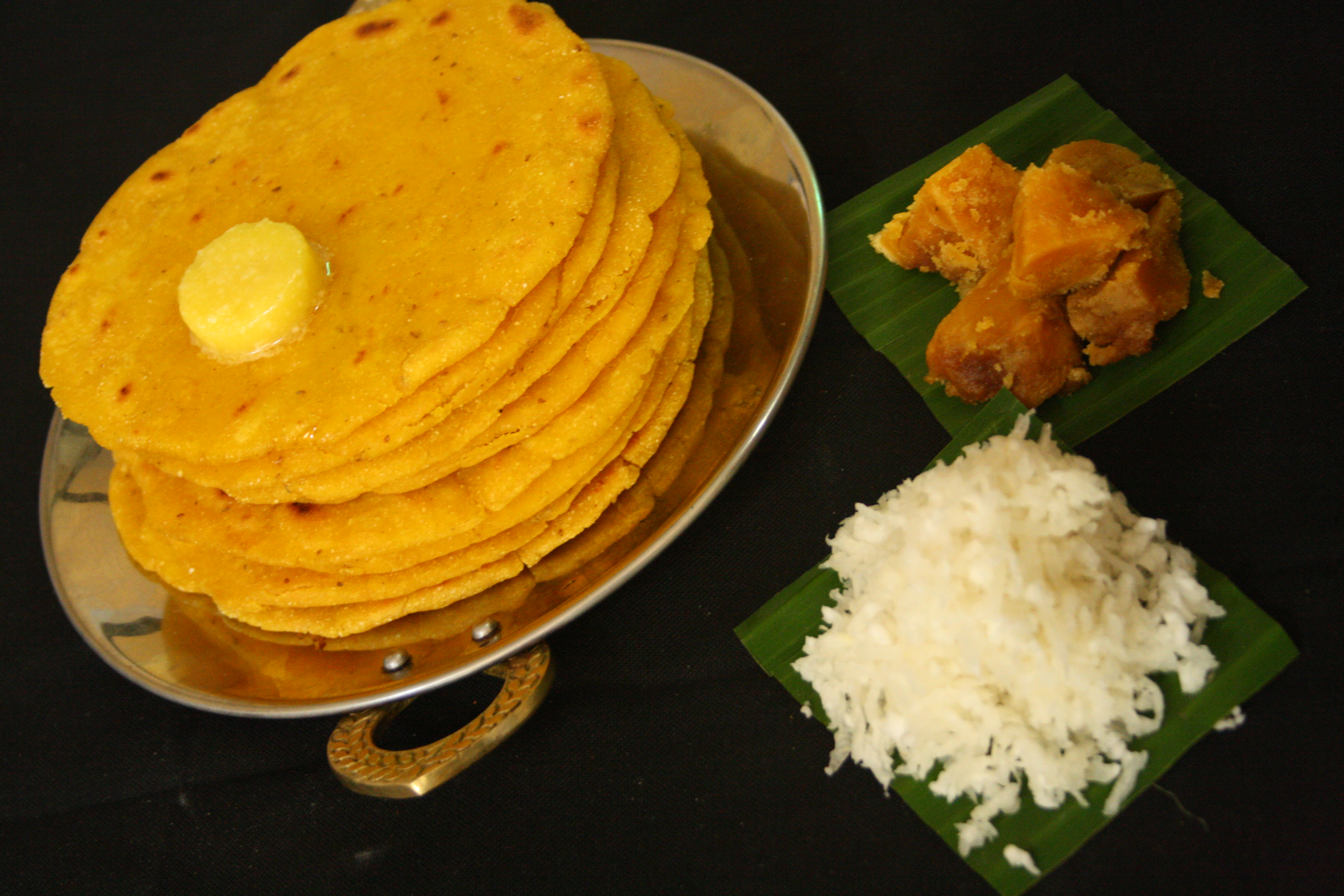
- Makki ki roti
- Alternative names: Makyachi bhaakri in Marathi, mokkajonna rottelu in Telugu, makai no rotlo in Gujarati, makki di roti or toudaa in Punjabi, makai ko roti in Nepali
- Type: Bread
- Place of origin: Indian subcontinent
- Region or state: Jammu, Himachal Pradesh, Punjab, Haryana, Rajasthan, Gujarat, Uttarakhand, and Uttar Pradesh
- Main ingredients: Corn flour

Makki ki roti is a flat unleavened bread made from corn meal (maize flour). Like most rotis in the Indian subcontinent, it is baked on a tava.

It is primarily eaten in the Punjab region of India and Pakistan and in Jammu, Himachal Pradesh, Haryana, Rajasthan, Uttar Pradesh, and Uttarakhand in North India; Gujarat and Maharashtra in Western India; and also in Nepal.

== Etymology ==
Literally, makkī kī roṭṭī means 'flatbread of maize'. The word makki is derived from Sanskrit 'markaka' and roti from Sanskrit 'rotīka'.

== Mode of serving ==
Makki ki roti is eaten in many parts of India, but has been portrayed as a centuries-old part of Punjabi cuisine.

Makki ki roti is often served with warming winter dishes based on greens (saag), such as sarson ka saag and channa ka saag. In Punjab and neighbouring areas it is also eaten with maah (urad) daal. Dogras have folk songs that mention makki di roti. Maize food items are also common in Rajasthan, including maize roti; maize is part of the staple diet of Bishnois of Rajasthan and Haryana. In Uttar Pradesh, maize roti is also eaten with ghee, butter, jaggery and pickles. In Gujarat, this dish is also known as makai no rotlo.

== See also ==
- List of breads
- Corn tortilla
- Talo (food)
