= Mansa Devi (Sikhism) =

Wife of the third Sikh guru

Mata Mansa Devi
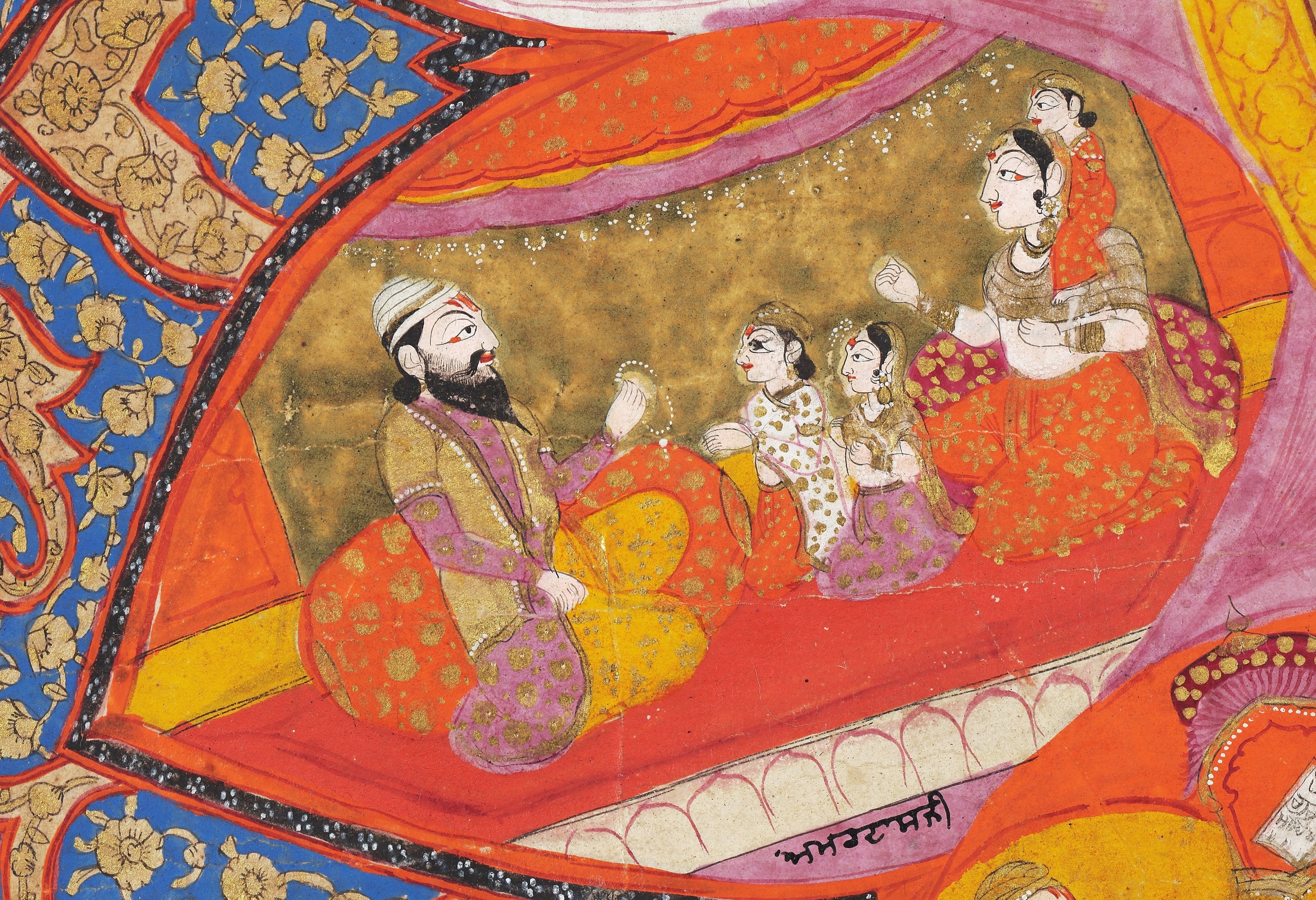
- Guru Amar Das' family. Guru Amar Das, Mansa Devi, and three children. Manuscript painting, ca.1839–1843.

Personal life
- Born: Mansa Devi Bahil Sankhatra
- Died: 1569 Goindwal
- Spouse: Guru Amar Das
- Children: 4, including Mata Bhani
- Parent: Dev Chand (father)

Religious life
- Religion: Sikhism

Mansa Devi (died 1569) was the wife of the third Sikh guru, Guru Amar Das. (Note: Her name is alternatively spelt as 'Manasa Devi'.)

== Name ==
Amongst Sikh sources, there are three different names ascribed to her.

== Early life ==
Mansa Devi was born in Sankhatra (located in present-day Sialkot district) as the daughter of a local Bahil Khatri man named Dev Chand.

== Marriage ==
She was wedded to Amar Das on 8 January 1503, whilst other sources give the year of marriage as 1502. For a while, the couple did not birth any children but eventually a daughter, named Dani, was born in 1530. The couple would have three further children: a second daughter Bhani (born in 1535), a son Mohan (born in 1536), and a second son Mohri (born in 1539).

She may have influenced her husband's egalitarian views in regards to gender, especially whilst the couple was at Goindwal. A number of reforms aimed at uplifting women and girls are linked to her presence. She convinced her husband to appoint female religious missionaries to spread Sikhism and the banning of sati. Jetha was selected personally by Mata Mansa Devi, as the best match for her daughter Bhani due to his devoted and pious personality.

== Death ==
Mansa Devi died in 1569 at Goindwal.
