= Mata Bhani =

Daughter of Guru Amar Das and wife of Guru Ram Das

Mata Bibi Bhani Ji
- ਬੀਬੀ ਭਾਨੀ
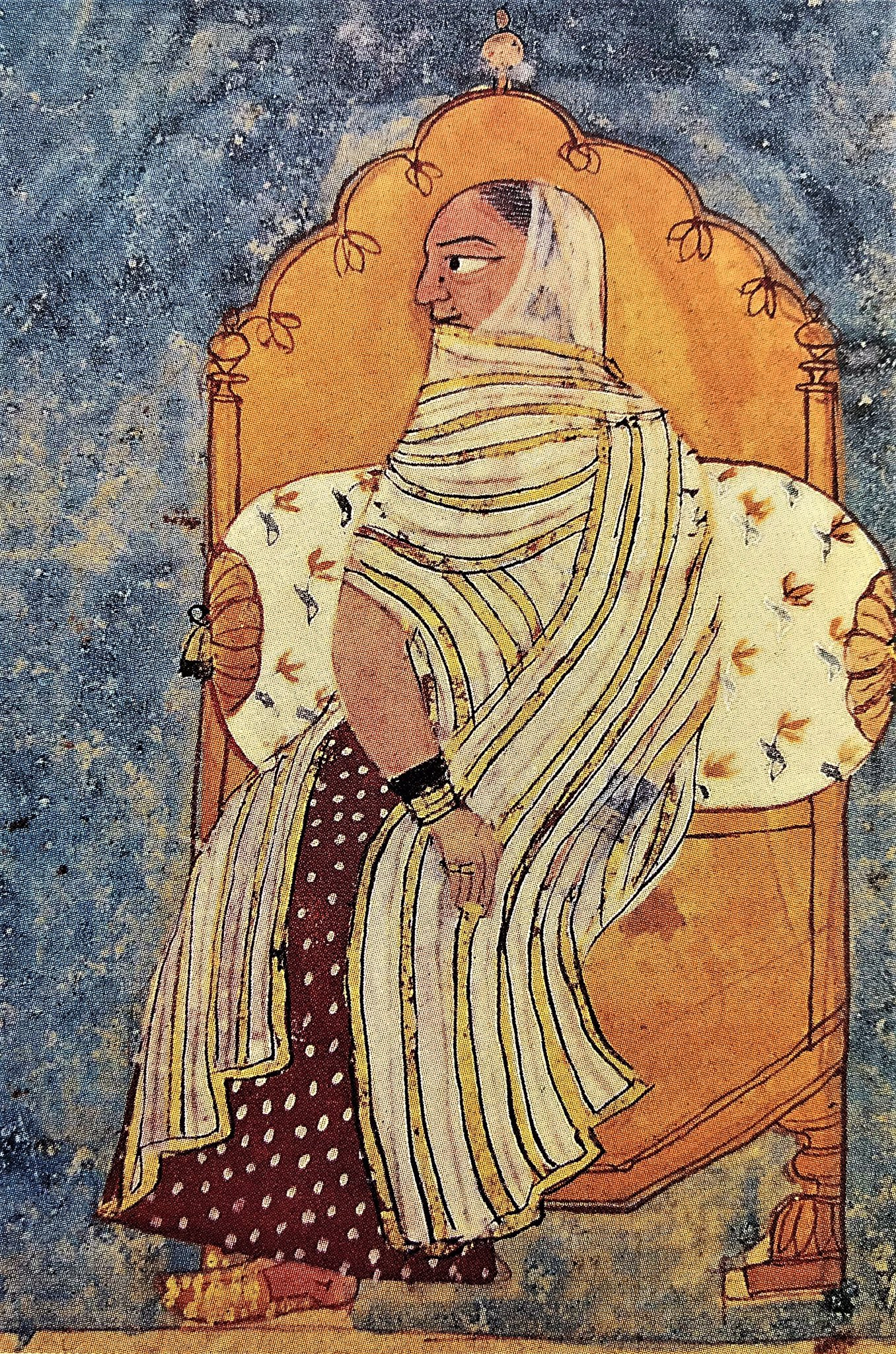
- 18th century painting of Bibi Bhani, commissioned by her descendants

Personal life
- Born: 19 January 1535 Basarke Gillan
- Died: 9 April 1598 (aged 63) Goindval
- Spouse: Bhai Jetha (whom later became Guru Ram Das)
- Children: Prithi Chand; Mahadev; Guru Arjan
- Parents: Guru Amar Das (father); Mata Mansa Devi (mother)
- Known for: Head leader of the Piri system
- Relatives: Bibi Dani (elder sister); Bhai Mohan and Bhai Mohri (brothers)

Religious life
- Religion: Sikhism

Bibi Bhani (Gurmukhi: ਬੀਬੀ ਭਾਨੀ; January 19, 1535 – April 9, 1598), also known as Mata Bhani (Gurmukhi: ਮਾਤਾ ਭਾਨੀ), was the daughter of Guru Amar Das, the third Sikh Guru. She played a central role in the history of Sikhism and is one of the four consorts bestowed with the title of Guru-Mahal.

== Biography ==
Bibi Bhani was born to Guru Amar Das and Mata Mansa Devi on 19 January 1535 in Basarke Gillan, a village near Amritsar. Her older sister was Bibi Dani and two brothers were Bhai Mohan and Bhai Mohri.

Her spouse was Bhai Jetha (who later became Guru Ram Das), a Sodhi Khatri from Lahore. The marriage was arranged by her father as he had been impressed by Jetha's devotion to seva (selfless service). Her mother, Mansa Devi, also noticed Jetha walking by one day and expressed a desire for her daughter to be wed to "a man like him" as she was anxious about her youngest daughter's unwed status. The two were wed on 18 February 1554. Bhai Jetha later moved to Goindval, a Sikh town, and carried out voluntary service (sewa) in the construction of Baoli Sahib (sacred well). They had three sons: Prithi Chand, Maha Dev, and Arjan Dev. She kept serving her father after her marriage, as her in-laws were local.

As the completion of the Gurdwara at Goindval neared, Guru Amar Das charged Bhai Jetha with the task of establishing a new Sikh center at a location that first was known as Ramdasar. Noticing that the waters of the pond were said to have "curative" powers, Bhai Jetha expanded the pond into a sarovar that he named Amritsar. It was in the center of this "Lake of Amrit" that the construction of the Harmandar Sahib was begun. The modern city of Amritsar took its name from Bhai Jetha's sarovar.

She is said to have served her father devoutly. One story involves her seeing Guru Amar Das meditating on a wooden seat. She noticed one of the legs of the seat were about to break so she used her hands to keep the seat upright to prevent the Guru from falling. After the Guru finished meditating, he noticed her hand was bleeding from holding the seat upright. After witnessing this, the Guru told her that her offspring will inherit the guruship.

During Akbar's visit to Guru Amar Das, it is said the emperor bestowed a jagir grant donation (lands and villages) as gifts to Bhani, putting the grant in her own name, as the Guru rejected receiving any such official state patronage in his own name. Akbar bestowed this land as a wedding gift for Bhani and he figuratively viewed her as his own daughter as well. According to one version of accounts, the jagir land that was gifted to her under her own name was used for the building of Ramdaspur (future Amritsar), where the Golden Temple was built.

She was one of the head leaders of the missionary Piri system that had been established by her father to disseminate Sikhism to women, having been chosen due to her intellectual inclinations. With this responsibility, she was tasked with educating women on the tenets and norms of the Sikh faith.

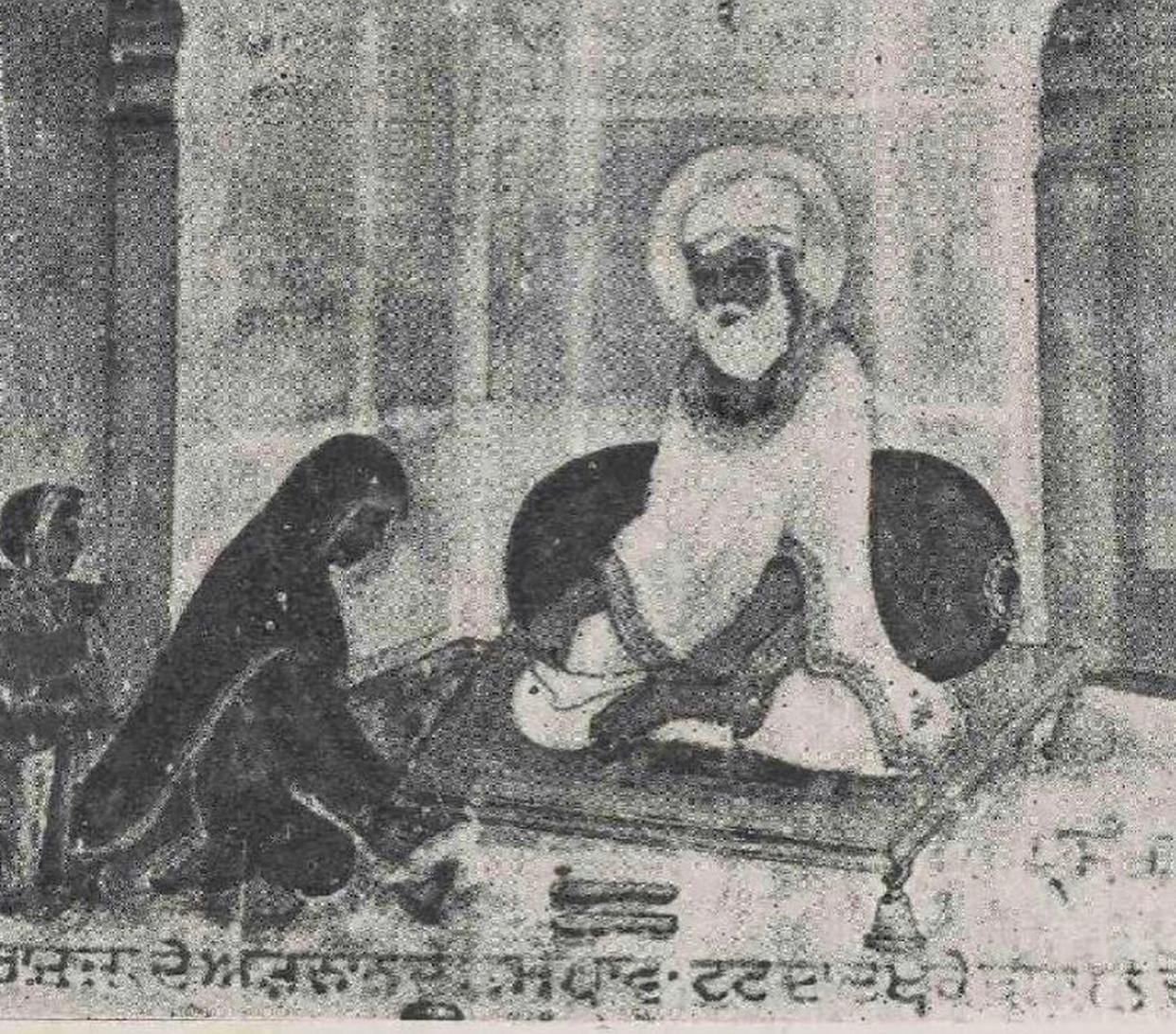
Mural formerly painted on the walls of the Baoli Sahib at Goindwal depicting the story of Bibi Bhani holding the platform Guru Amar Das was seated on whilst meditating when one of its four legs broke

Bhani was the one who convinced Guru Amar Das to change the system of choosing a successor for the Sikh guruship to a hereditary one (but still grounded on a successor being chosen on merit).

Bibi Bhani died in Goindval on 9 April 1598.

== Legacy ==
It is postulated that Bhani may have been considered as a potential successor of her father for the Sikh guruship, however this did not come to be and her husband was selected instead. Scholar Doris Jakobsh states the following:

...Bhani alone was singled out as his [Amar Das's] economic successor. Bequeathing lands and villages to a female heir would have been inconceivable in even the later social and cultural milieu of ensuing chroniclers. Clearly, even the inclusion of Bibi Bhani as a possible leader points to an imagination which, given the Guru's estimation of his daughter and the possible inclusion of females among the elite devotees, envisioned a central place of leadership for women in the Sikh world view.

— Doris Jakobsh, Relocating Gender in Sikh History (2003), page 31

== See also ==
- Guru Amar Das
- Guru Ram Das
- Guru Arjan

== Sources ==
- Copyright © Harbans Singh "The encyclopedia of Sikhism. Vol III." pages 1 – 4
- Bhalla, Sarup Das, Mahima Prakash. Patiala, 1971
- Chhibbar, Kesar Singh, Bansavalinama Dasan Patshahiali Ka. Chandigarh, 1972
- Gian Singh, Giani, Twarikh Curu Khalsa. Patiala, 1970
