= Guru Amar Das =

Third Sikh guru from 1552 to 1574

- ਗੁਰੂ ਅਮਰ ਦਾਸ
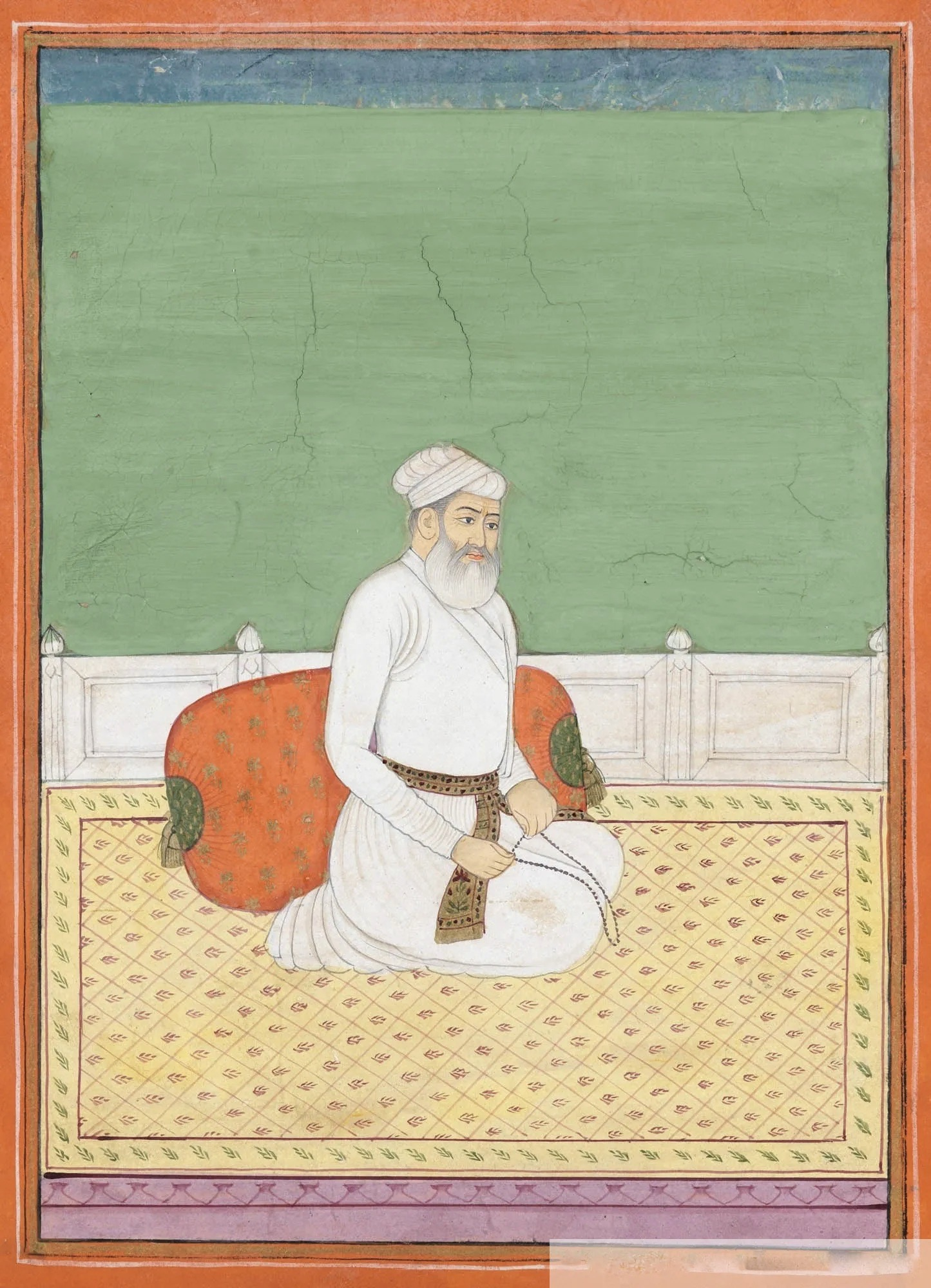
- Late 18th century painting of Guru Amar Das

Personal life
- Born: Amar Das; 5 May 1479 Basarke, Delhi Sultanate (present-day Amritsar district, Punjab, India)
- Died: 1 September 1574 (aged 95) Goindwal Sahib, Mughal Empire (present-day Punjab, India)
- Spouse: Mansa Devi
- Children: Bhai Mohan (1507 - 1567); Bhai Mohri (1514 - 1569); Bibi Dani (1526 - 1569); Bibi Bhani (1532 - 1598)
- Parent(s): Tej Bhan & Mata Lachmi Devi
- Known for: Anand Sahib; Sikh Manji system; Langar, Sikh congregations at Diwali, Vaisakhi; Speaking against Sati Pratha and Purdah system
- Other names: Third Master; Third Nanak

Religious life
- Religion: Sikhism

Religious career
- Based in: Goindval
- Period in office: 1552–1574
- Predecessor: Guru Angad
- Successor: Guru Ramdas

Guru Amar Das (Gurmukhi: ਗੁਰੂ ਅਮਰ ਦਾਸ, pronunciation: [gʊɾuː əməɾᵊ d̯aːsᵊ]; 5 May 1479 – 1 September 1574), sometimes spelled as Guru Amardas, was the third guru of Sikhism and became Sikh Guru on 26 March 1552 at age 73.

Before becoming a Sikh, on a pilgrimage after having been prompted to search for a guru, he heard his nephew's wife, Bibi Amro, reciting a hymn by Guru Nanak, and was deeply moved by it. Amro was the daughter of Guru Angad, the second Guru of the Sikhs. Amar Das persuaded Amro to introduce him to her father. In 1539, Amar Das, at the age of sixty, met Guru Angad and became a Sikh, devoting himself to the Guru. In 1552, before his death, Guru Angad appointed Amar Das as the third Guru of Sikhism.

Guru Amar Das was an important innovator in the teachings of Guru who introduced a religious organization called the Manji system by appointing trained clergy, a system that expanded and survives into the contemporary era. He also established the Peerah system for propagating the religion to women. He wrote and compiled hymns into a Pothi (book) that ultimately helped create the Adi Granth. He also enacted social reforms, such as by allowing widow remarriage, promoting intercaste alliance, encouraging monogamy, banning sati, and discouraging purdah.

Amar Das remained the Guru of the Sikhs till age 95, and named his son-in-law Bhai Jetha, who was later remembered by the name Guru Ram Das, as his successor.

== Early life ==
=== Family background and birth ===
Amar Das was born to mother Bakht Kaur (also known as Sullakhani, Lakhmi Devi, or Rup Kaur (Note: Harish C. Jain believes attributing the names of 'Sullakhani' and 'Lakhmi Devi' as his mother's names is an error.)) and father Tej Bhan Bhalla on 5 May 1479 in Basarke village in what is now called Amritsar district of Punjab (India). (Note: Some sources state 1509 as his year of birth.) His grandfather was Hari Das. His family belonged to the Bhalla gotra (clan) of the Khatri tribe. Amar Das was the eldest child out of four sons. Amar Das worked as both an agriculturalist and a trader.

==== Birth year ====
Whilst the most commonly accepted and recorded date for Guru Amar Das's birth year is 1479, many sources give a much later date of 1509.

Some sources that affirm the 1479 year of birth for the guru are: Ganda Singh's Makhaz-i-Twarikh-i-Sikhan, Karam Singh's Gurpurab Nirnay, Kahn Singh Nabha's Mahan Kosh, Max Arthur MaCauliffe's The Sikh Religion, and Giani Gian Singh's Panth Prakash and Twarikh Guru Khalsa.

Sources that give a later year of 1509 as the birth year for the guru are: Joseph Davey Cunningham's History of the Sikhs and Kesar Singh Chibber's Bansavalinama.

Kavi Santokh Singh in the Suraj Prakash gives an even earlier year of birth of 1469, coinciding with Guru Nanak's.

=== Marriage ===
In his early 20s, Amar Das married Mansa Devi and they had four children which they named Dani (daughter; born in 1530), Bhani (daughter; born 3 August 1533), Mohan (son; born 11 March 1536), and Mohri (son; born 2 June 1539). (Note: Mohri's name is alternatively spelt as 'Mohari'.) Bhani was his favourite child of the four.

=== Religious pilgrimages ===
Amar Das had followed the Vaishnavism tradition of Hinduism for much of his life. He was reputed to have gone on some twenty annual pilgrimages into the Himalayas, to Haridwar on the river Ganges. About 1539, on one such Hindu pilgrimage, he met a Hindu monk (sadhu) who asked him why he did not have a guru (teacher, spiritual counselor) and Amar Das decided to get one. On his return from his twentieth pilgrimage to the Ganges River, he heard Bibi Amro, the daughter of the Sikh Guru Angad, singing a hymn by Guru Nanak. Amro had been acquainted with Amar Das through her in-laws, whom Amar Das was related to (Amro was married to the son of Amar Das's brother). He learned from her about Guru Angad, and with her help met the second Guru of Sikhism and adopted him as his spiritual Guru who was much younger than his own age.

=== Service of Guru Angad ===
Mural depicting Guru Angad and Guru Amar Das with attendants on a terrace from the Bhai Bahlo Darwaza of the Darbar of Ram Rai in Dehradun, circa 1676–1687

Amar Das is famous in the Sikh tradition for his relentless service to Guru Angad, with legends about waking up in the early hours and fetching water for his Guru's bath, cleaning and cooking for the volunteers with the Guru, as well devoting much time to meditation and prayers in the morning and evening.

Due to his selfless devotion to the second guru, Angad nominated Amar Das as his spiritual successor on 29 March 1552.

== Guruship ==
After eleven years most devoted service of Guru Angad and the sangats, Amar Das was nominated the third guru. Amar Das moved to Goindwal situated not far away from Khadur on the bank of river Beas on the high road to Lahore, about 8 kilometres from Kapurthala and 45 kms. from Amritsar. He did so to avoid the pending conflict with Guru Angad's sons who had not approved of their supersession. Even at Goindwal he was harassed by Angad's son Datu. He went to Goindwal and said: "Only yesterday thou wert a water-carrier in our house, and today thou sittest as a Guru. "Saying this he kicked the Guru off his seat. Amar Das humbly said: "O great king, pardon me. Thou must have hurt thy foot." Amar Das retired from Goindwal and hid himself in a house at Basarke, his home village. Datu set himself up as the Guru. Amar Das was persuaded by Baba Buddha to return, and Datu, finding no following, went back to Khadur.

=== Teachings ===
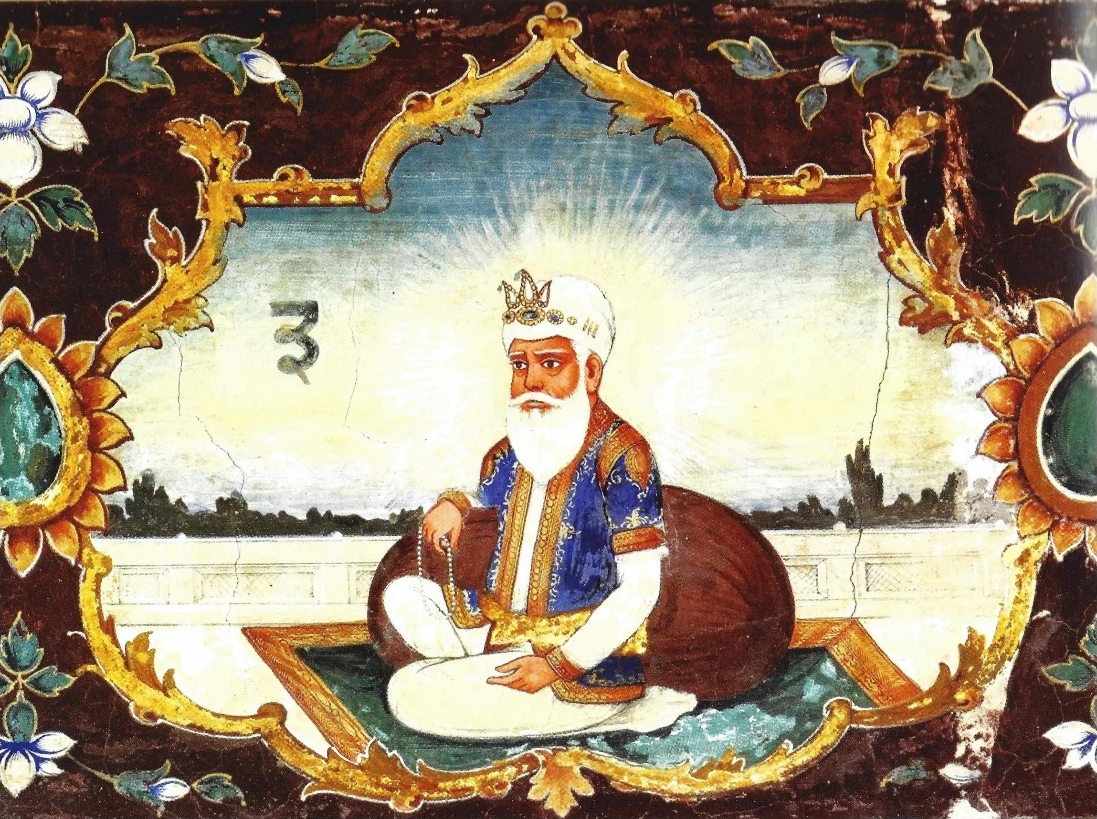
Fresco depiction of Guru Amar Das from Baoli Sahib, Goindwal

Guru Amar Das taught with his own life the meaning of Guru Service, also known in Punjabi religious parlance as Guru Sewa. (also spelt Sevā). Amar Das emphasized both spiritual pursuits as well as an ethical daily life. He encouraged his followers to wake up before dawn, do their ablutions and then meditate in silent seclusion. A good devotee, taught Amar Das, should be truthful, keep his mind in control, eat only when hungry, seek the company of pious men, worship the Lord, make an honest living, serve holy men, not covet another's wealth and never slander others. He recommended holy devotion with Guru's image in his follower's hearts.

Guru Amar Das was also a reformer, and discouraged veiling of women's faces (a Muslim custom) as well as sati (a Hindu custom). He encouraged the Kshatriya people to fight in order to protect people and for the sake of justice, stating this is Dharma. He promoted inter-caste marriages, going against the traditional Punjabi social orthodoxy at the time by doing-so. He also promoted the remarriage of widows. He promulgated monogamy as the ideal romantic relationship type.

=== Influence ===
==== Religious organization and missionary dissemination ====
Guru Amar Das started the tradition of appointing manji (zones of religious administration with an appointed chief called sangatias, whom were both men and women), introduced the dasvandh ("the tenth" of income) system of revenue collection in the name of Guru and as pooled community religious resource, and the famed langar tradition of Sikhism where anyone, without discrimination of any kind, could get a free meal in a communal seating. He also started and inaugurated the 84-level step well called baoli at Goindval with a resting place, modeled along the lines of the Indian tradition of dharmsala, which then became a Sikh pilgrimage (tirath) center. Another organization analogous of the Manji was the Piri, which involved an appointed preaching official and missionary for Sikh assemblies and congregations whom were all women and instructed to spread Sikhism amongst womankind (especially women belonging to Muslim backgrounds). According to W. Owen Cole, establishment of the manji and piri systems may have been motivated by the large amounts of new converts coming into the Sikh faith, especially in the Punjab. However, many of these converts brought in beliefs and practices of their original faith, so the preachers were appointed to instruct them on proper Sikh orthodoxy and orthopraxy, essentially motivating them to choose the Sikh faith and all that comes with it, even if it involves discarding their old ways of spirituality in the process. He appointed women to become the congregation leaders of the jurisdictions of Afghanistan and Kashmir. The women appointed for leading the Piri system of disseminating Sikhism to women were Bhani (his younger daughter), Bibi Dani (his elder daughter), and Bibi Pal, all of whom were intellectual types. The Piri system also educated womenfolk in social plus religious norms and customs.

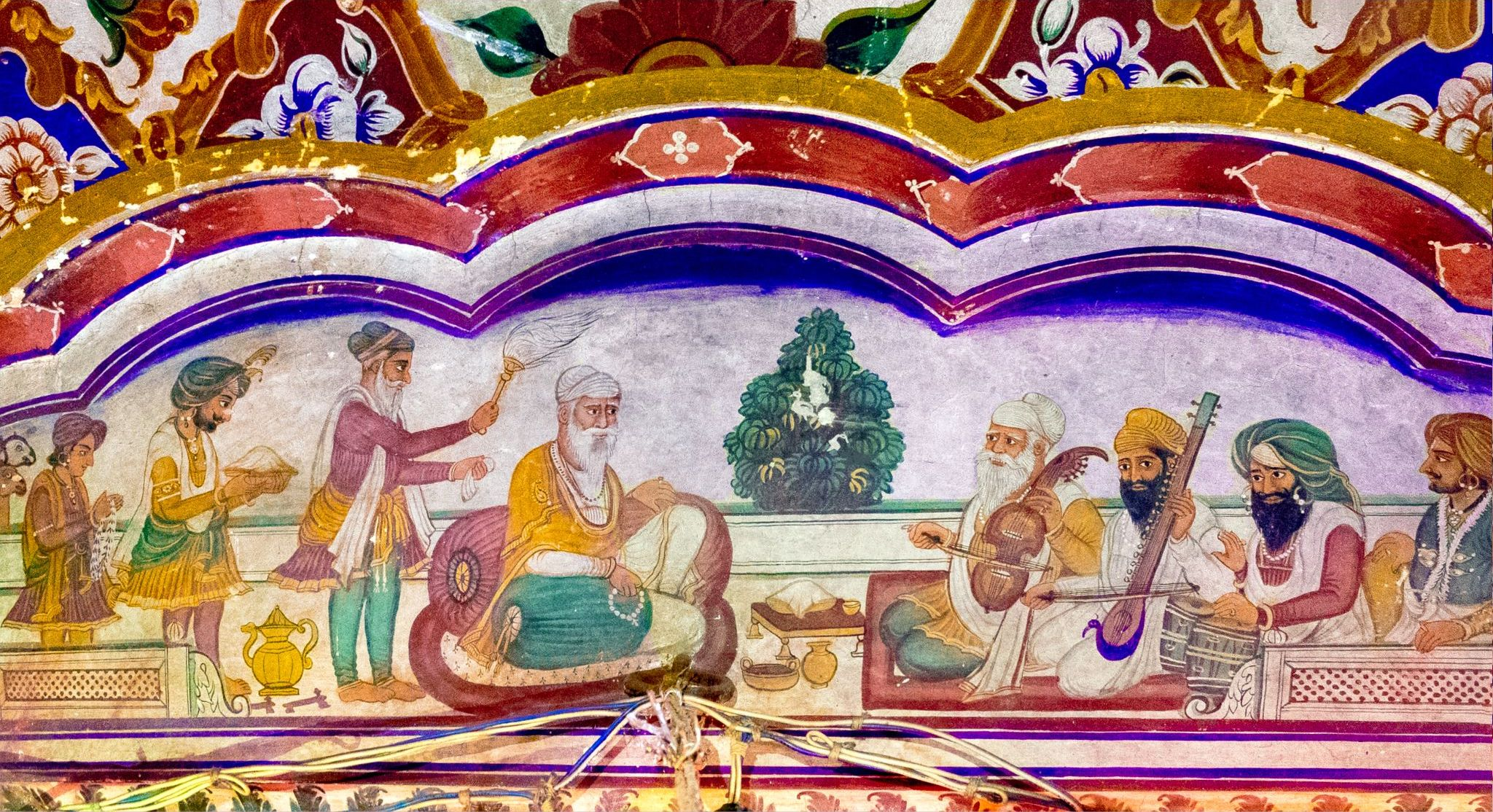
Fresco depicting a Sikh ragi jatha musically performing using traditional instruments in the presence of Guru Amar Das from Asthan Baba Bikram Singh Bedi, Kanak Mandi, Amritsar, ca.1863–1879

Amar Das personally patronized the education of his son-in-law Jetha (future Guru Ram Das) in North Indian classical music, and Bhai Gurdas, in various languages and religious literature.

==== Banning of Sati ====
Guru Amar Das was a strong opponent of sati, the practice of widowed wives being immolated on the funeral pyre of their deceased husband during the latter's cremation. He states the following regarding the practice:

"Women are not Satis, who burn themselves with their husband's corpse.
Rather they are Satis who die by the mere shock of separation from their husband
And, they, too, ought to be considered as Satis, who abide in modesty and contentment,
Who wait upon their Lord and rising in the morn ever remember him."

— Guru Amar Das, Var Suhi of the Guru Granth Sahib (page 787), translation from Indian Feminism: Class, Gender & Identity in Medieval Ages (2016) by Rukhsana Iftikhar

He further states:

"Women are burnt in the fire with their husbands
They undergo sufficient pain by their death.
And if they appreciated not their husbands
Nanak, why should they be burnt at all?"

— Guru Amar Das, translation from Indian Feminism: Class, Gender & Identity in Medieval Ages (2016) by Rukhsana Iftikhar

==== Opposing the Purdah system ====
Purdah is a traditional custom of women obscuring their face and bodies when in the company of men and secluding themselves from the company of men. Guru Amar Das was vehemently against this custom and is said to have once reprimanded the visiting raja (king) of Haripur and his wives when the latter observed the custom around him. One of the queens of the raja refused to part ways with veiling herself, in which the Guru responded: "if thou art not pleased with the Guru's face why halt thou come hither."

==== Akbar ====
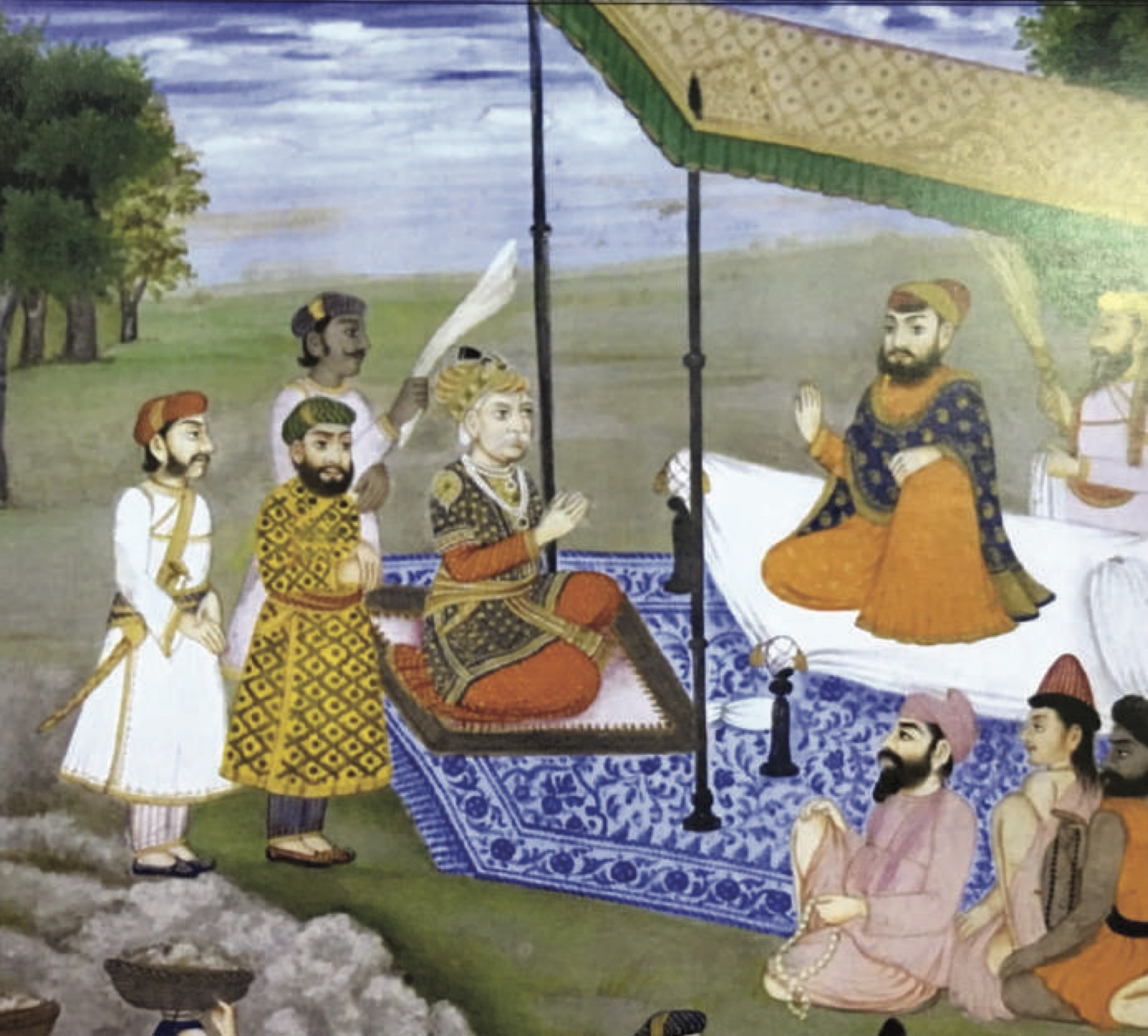
19th century painting of Mughal emperor Akbar meeting Guru Amar Das in 1567 at Goindwal

The Mughal Emperor Akbar met Guru Amar Das. According to the Sikh legend, he neither received Akbar nor was Akbar directly ushered to him, rather the Guru suggested that Akbar like everyone sit on the floor and eat in the langar with everyone before their first meeting. Akbar, who sought to encourage tolerance and acceptance across religious lines, readily accepted the suggestion. After the conclusion of the Langar, Akbar sat in the congregation with the rest of the sangat and asked the Guru a question. The Sikh hagiographies called janam-sakhis mention that Guru Amar Das persuaded Akbar to repeal the tax on Hindu pilgrims going to Haridwar. Prominent Sikh figure Bhai Mani Singh (1718), mentions prior to the meeting Akbar pleaded the Guru for a blessing in annexing the difficult to capture Chittorgarh, which the Guru gave and after the meeting he gave 84 villages in the name of his prominent Sikh Guru Ram Das after the Guru himself refused.

==== Rituals in Sikhism: wedding, festivals, funeral ====
Amar Das composed the rapturous hymn called Anand and made it a part of the ritual of Sikh marriage called "Anand Karaj", which literally means "blissful event".

Amar Das believed that a successful marriage was one in which the souls of the husband and wife became one metaphorically:

"They are not husband and wife who sit together. Rather are they wife and husband who have one sprit in two bodies"

— Guru Amar Das, translation from Indian Feminism: Class, Gender & Identity in Medieval Ages (2016) by Rukhsana Iftikhar

The Anand hymn is sung, in contemporary times, not only during Sikh weddings but also at major celebrations. Parts of the "Anand hymn" are recited in Sikh temples (Gurdwara) every evening, at the naming of a Sikh baby, as well as during a Sikh funeral. It is a section of the Anand Sahib composition of Guru Amar Das, printed on pages 917 to 922 of the Adi Granth and set to the "Ramkali" raga.

Guru Amar Das's entire Anand Sahib composition is a linguistic mix of Panjabi and Hindi languages, reflecting Guru Amar Das's upbringing and background. The hymn celebrates the freedom from suffering and anxiety, the union of the soul with the divine, describing a devotee's bliss achieved through the Guru with inner devotion and by repeating the Name of the Creator. The hymn states in stanza 19 that the Vedas teach "the Name is supreme", in stanza 27 that Smriti and Shastra discuss the good and the bad but are unreal because they lack a Guru and that it is the grace of the Guru which awakens the heart and the devotion to the Name. The hymn celebrates the life of a householder and constant inner devotion to the One, ending each stanza with the characteristic "says Nanak".

Guru Amar Das is also credited in the Sikh tradition to have encouraged building of temples and places where Sikhs could gather together on festivals such as Maghi, Diwali and Vaisakhi. He required his disciples to gather together for prayers and communal celebrations in autumn for Diwali and in spring for Vaisakhi, both post harvest ancient festivals of India.

==== Founding of Goindwal and construction of the Baoli Sahib ====
Guru Amar Das was responsible for establishing a new centre of Sikh authority at Goindwal and erecting a stepwell known as Baoli Sahib at the location. The foresight of the Guru building a headquarters at the central location of Goindwal in the Punjab on the bank of the Beas River, being intersected by the three major cultural regions of the area (Majha, Malwa, and Doaba), may have facilitated the fast-spread of Sikhism throughout the three main regions of Punjab. The Baoli Sahib was the first truly Sikh pilgrimage site and it helped attract new prospective members to the faith.

==== Site of the Golden Temple ====
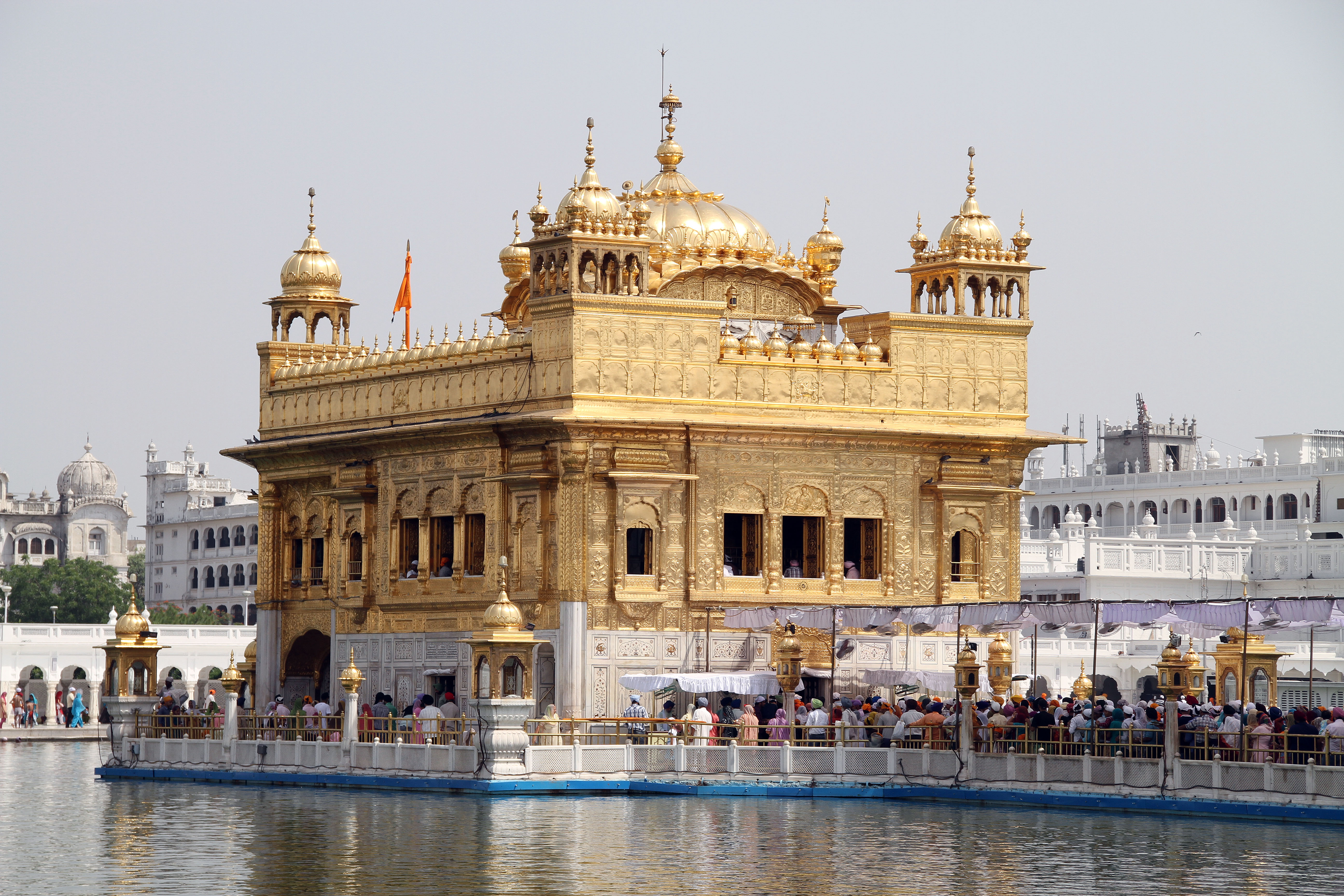
Guru Amar Das picked the site for Harimandir Sahib (Golden Temple).

Guru Amar Das selected the site in Amritsar village for a special temple, that Guru Ram Das began building, Guru Arjan completed and inaugurated, and the Sikh Maharaja Ranjit Singh gilded. This temple has evolved into the contemporary "Harimandir Sahib", or the temple of Hari (God), also known as the Golden Temple. It is the most sacred pilgrimage site in Sikhism.

==== Festivals ====
Scholars such as Pashaura Singh, Louis E. Fenech and William McLeod state that Guru Amar Das was influential in introducing "distinctive features, pilgrimages, festivals, temples and rituals" that ever since his time have been an integral part of Sikhism. He was responsible for solidifying the dates of Vaisakhi and Diwali as biannual affairs where Sikhs could gather together and meet directly with their guru.

==== Scripture ====
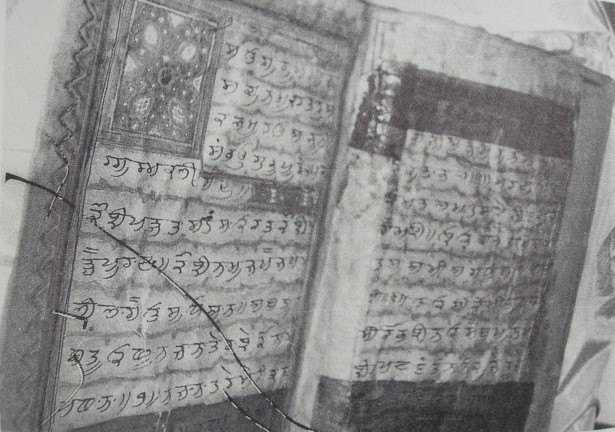
Folios from the Pinjore recension of the Goindwal Pothi, circa 1570's

Amar Das is also remembered as the innovator who began the collection of hymns now known as Goindwal Pothi or Mohan Pothi, the precursor to what became the Adi Granth – the first edition of Sikh scripture – under the fifth Sikh Master, which finally emerged as the Guru Granth Sahib under the tenth Sikh Master. The nearly 900 hymns composed by Guru Amar Das constitute the third largest part, or about 15%, of the Guru Granth Sahib.

=== Choosing a successor ===
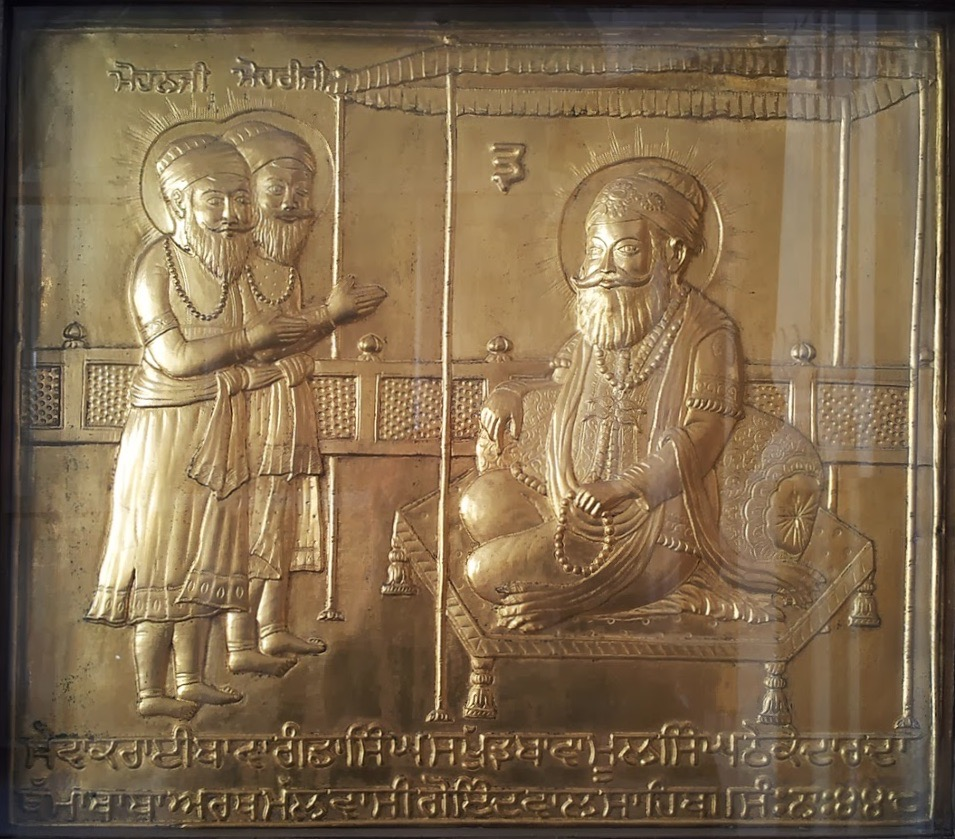
Gilded panel depicting Guru Amar Das with his sons, Baba Mohan and Baba Mohri, from Gurdwara Chaubara Sahib

Amar Das had four people in mind that would succeed him as the next Guru:

1. Ramu, his son-in-law (Note: Also known as Bhai Rama, he was married to his elder daughter, Dani.)
2. Jetha, his son-in-law (Note: He was married to his younger daughter, Bhani.)
3. Mohan, his elder son
4. Mohri, his younger son

He devised four tests for them all to undertake to decide who will inherit the guruship. It is said that only Jetha passed them all.

It has been postulated that he may have considered his own daughter, Bhani, as a possible successor for the guruship at some point.

== Death ==
Shortly before his death, it is recorded in Ramkali Sadu (composed by his great-grandson, Baba Sundar), that he called upon all of his familial relatives to acknowledge the new Guru, Ram Das, and personally placed the sandal paste on Bhai Jetha's forehead to anoint him as his successor. He died in 1574, in Goindwal Sahib, and like other Sikh Gurus he was cremated, with the "flowers" (remaining bones and ash after the cremation) immersed into harisar (flowing waters).

== Literature ==
A large amount of written works is attributed to Guru Amar Das. His poetic works closely mirror those of Guru Nanak, a conservative approach which may have been due to the old-age of Amar Das when he became the guru. Furthermore, the Sikh textual tradition advanced heavily during his guruship tenure, with an example being the compiling of the Goindwal Pothis. Amar Das provides commentary on selections of the Bhagat Bani that had by this stage already been included in the Goindwal Pothis. His most principal work was the Anand Sahib, which focuses on the relationship between the guru, his disciples (Sikhs), and bani.

== In popular culture ==
Guru Amardas is a 1979 documentary film, directed by Prem Prakash and produced by the Government of India's Films Division, covering his life and teachings.

== Gallery ==
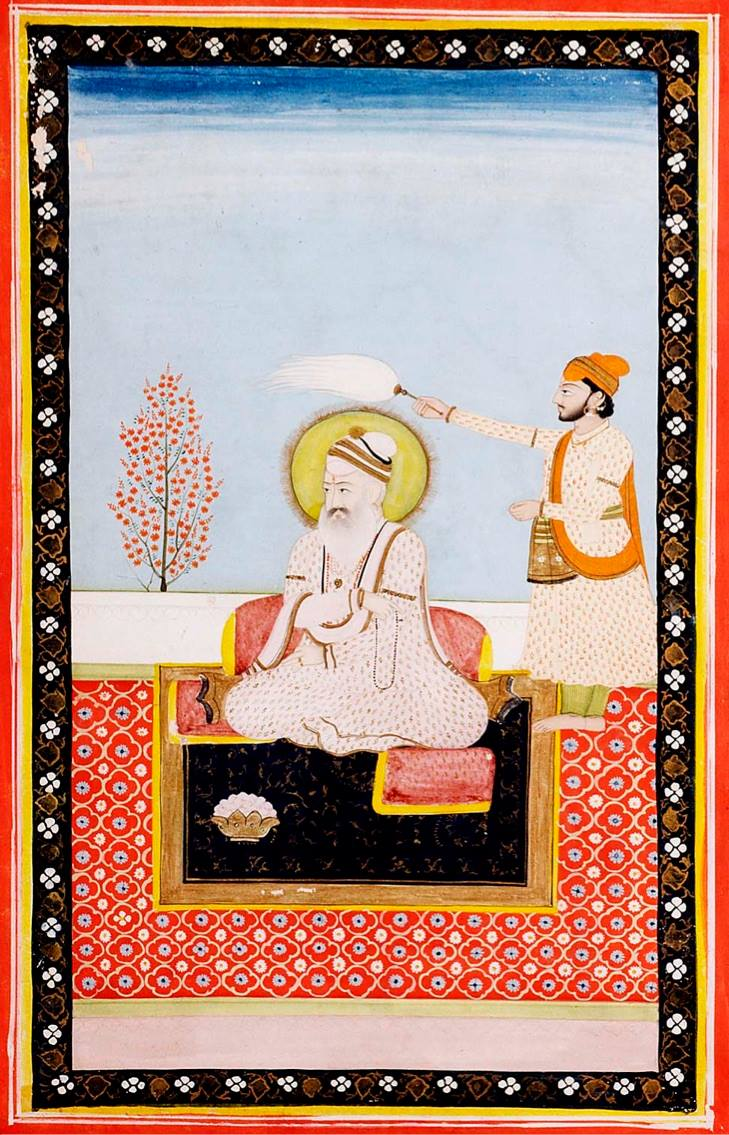
Guru Amar Das, painting from ca.1800–1810.

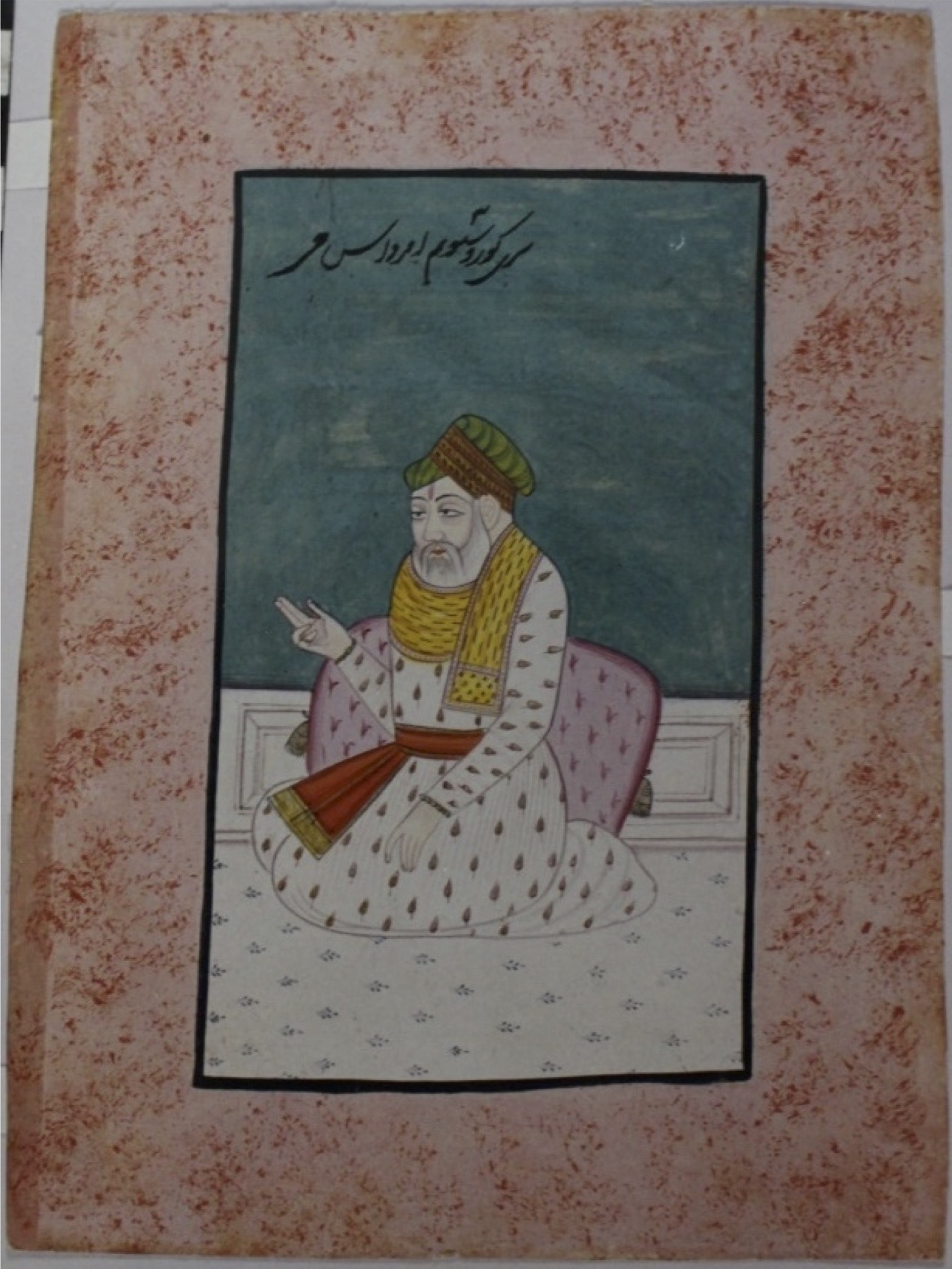
Guru Amar Das miniature painting.

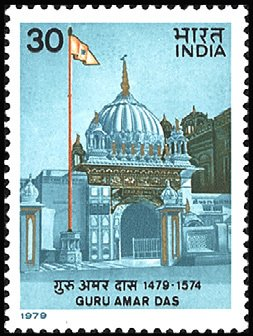
500th Birth Anniv. Guru Amar Das postage stamp 1979

== See also ==
- Bhakti
- Bhakti movement
- Dasam Granth
- Japji

== Notes ==
Preceded by Guru Angad	Sikh Guru; 26 March 1552 – 1 September 1574	Succeeded by Guru Ram Das
