= Ramkali Sadu =

Sikh composition

Sad(h)/ਸਦੁ
- by Baba Sundar ji
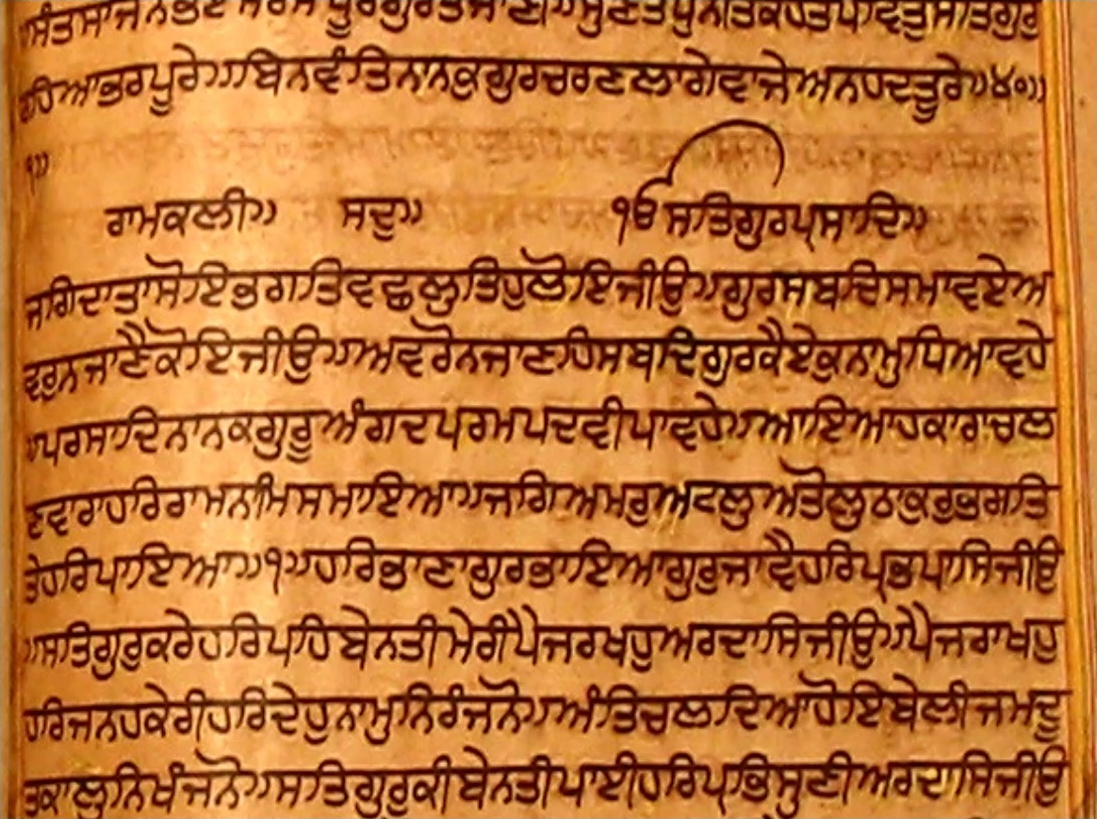
- Opening lines of the Ramkali Sadh composition present within a historical, handwritten Guru Granth Sahib manuscript
- Original title: Ramkali Sadh, Sidh Gosti
- Written: Punjab, Mid 16th Century
- First published in: Adi Granth, 1604
- Country: India
- Language: Gurmukhi
- Subject: Physical Death vs Spiritual Death
- Genre: Religion
- Meter: Ramkali
- Lines: 6 Stanzas
- Preceded by: Ramkali Mahalla 3 Anand (ਰਾਮਕਲੀ ਮਹਲਾ ੩ ਅਨੰਦੁ)
- Followed by: Ramkali Mahalla 5 Chantt (ਰਾਮਕਲੀ ਮਹਲਾ ੫ ਛੰਤ)

Ramkali Sadh (ਰਾਮਕਲੀ ਸਦੁ) is a composition present in Guru Granth Sahib on ang 923/924, composed by Baba Sundar, in Ramkali Raga. The composition has 6 stanzas. Sadh literally means 'call' (ਸੱਦਾ). This narration tells Sikh attitude towards physical death of a Gurmukh. It also narrates events of the succession of Gur Ram Das over Gur Amar Das.

== Keso Gopal Pundit ==
Keso Gopal Pandit (ਕੇਸੋ ਗੋਪਾਲ ਪੰਡਿਤ) is a qualitative name used for a Sikh in Ramkali Sadu. Here "Pundit" is not singular, but plural. Following is the stanza where this name is present:

ਕੇਸੋ ਗੋਪਾਲ ਪੰਡਿਤ ਸਦਿਅਹੁ ਹਰਿ ਹਰਿ ਕਥਾ ਪੜਹਿ ਪੁਰਾਣੁ ਜੀਉ ॥

Traditional commentators thought it to be some historical person during the time of Guru Amar Dass. However, linguistically, experts agree 'Keso Gopal Pandit' refers to a learned scholar (Pundit) who has extensive knowledge and wisdom. In Gurmat, Gurmukhi have knowledge of Keso/Gopal. Others believe Guru Amar Das ji to be simply asking to invite 'such a learned scholar(s)', who can read the sermon of the eternal lord, har har.
