= Piri (Sikhism) =

The Piri (Punjabi Gurmukhi:ਪੀੜ੍ਹੀ ,Shahmukhi :پیڑھی) system (also known or spelt as Peerah or Peehri) was part of the Sikh missionary administrative organization founded by the third Sikh guru, Guru Amar Das, for the purpose of propagating Sikhism amongst women (especially women from Muslim backgrounds). The system was significantly expanded by the seventh Sikh Guru, Guru Har Rai. Each Piri was a Sikh missionary seat and administrative unit. The Piris were sub-centres under the Manji system.

== Etymology ==
A Piri (Punjabi Gurmukhi: ਪੀੜ੍ਹੀ, a very small cot primarily used by women while performing household work) (here taken as the seat of authority in this context) from which the Sikh Piris (female Sikh preachers, holders of seat of religious authority) would teach Sikhism specifically to other women. Peerah comes from the Punjabi word for "chair". The word Manji also means a wooden cot, similarly used to denote a seat of Sikh religious authority for preaching Sikhism to the general public.

== History ==
=== Founding ===
Guru Amar Das trained and appointed 52 women alongside 94 men as missionaries for the spread of Sikhism. For the Piri system, it involved an appointed preaching official and missionary for Sikh assemblies and congregations whom were all women and instructed to spread Sikhism amongst women (especially women belonging to Muslim backgrounds). According to W. Owen Cole, establishment of the manji and piri systems may have been motivated by the large amounts of new converts coming into the Sikh faith, especially in the Punjab. However, many of these converts brought in beliefs and practices of their original faith, so the preachers were appointed to instruct them on proper Sikh orthodoxy and orthopraxy, essentially motivating them to choose the Sikh faith and all that comes with it, even if it involves discarding their old ways of spirituality in the process. The head leaders of the Piri system were Mata Bhani, Bibi Dani, and Bibi Pal, all of whom had been appointed by Guru Amar Das himself and were intellectual types. Besides the dissemination of Sikhism, the piris also taught women about social and religious norms. According to Harish Jain, rather than being a separate system from the Manji system, the Piri system was rather a sub-centre of each Manji. The number of Piri centres was 52, which were under the purview of 22 Manjis.

=== Expansion ===
Guru Har Rai faced some serious difficulties during the period of his guruship. The corrupt masand Dhir Mal and heretical Mina sect always tried to preclude the advancement of the Sikh religion.

Earlier, the Piri system was founded by Guru Amar Das. To reform the corrupted Masand system, Guru Har Rai expanded the Piri system by establishing additional female Sikh missionary seats called Piris after the small cot (manji) used by the Guru's representatives. He also tried to improve the old corrupt Masand system and appointed pious and committed personalities, such as Suthre Shah, Sahiba, Sangtia, Mian Sahib, Bhagat Bhagwan, Bhagat Mal and Jeet Mal Bhagat (also known as Bairagi), as the heads of Manjis.

== See also ==
- Sikh Gurus
- Women in Sikhism
