= Baba Sunder =

Gursikh writer of the Guru Granth Sahib

Personal life
- Parent: Anand Das (father)
- Known for: Composing Ramkali Sadu

Religious life
- Religion: Sikhism

Baba Sunder, also spelt as Sundar, was one of the four Gursikhs whose gurbani is present in Guru Granth Sahib.

== Biography ==
He was the great-grandson of the third Sikh Guru, Guru Amar Das. His father is said to be Anand Das, and he is the grandson of Guru Amardas' younger son, Baba Mohri. He is said to have had a pleasant childhood and had deep affection for his great-grandfather, Guru Amar Das.

=== Works ===
He was known for his composition, Ramkali Sadu, which was composed by him, and is present on Angs (pages) 923–924 of the Guru Granth Sahib. The composition contains six stanzas, or padas. Sadh literally means "call" (ਸੱਦਾ). The hymn states how Guru Amardas has become one with Almighty God and appoints Guru Ramdas as the next guru, and how he told his family not to weep for him after his death. The composition also explains the reaction of a Sikh towards physical death. It also expounds on the importance of kirtan on the spiritual path and describes the nature of the Sikh gurus as different physical bodies embodied by one spirit. It is also one of the earliest surviving literature documenting the death of a Sikh guru, as it testifies that around the time Guru Amar Das died, he anointed Bhai Jeṭhā (later Guru Ram Das) as his successor, placed sandal paste on his forehead (as a mark of passing on the Guruship, and requested that all of his familial relations pay obeisance to him.
