= Goindwal =

Goindwal Sahib
- Town
- Location in Punjab, India Goindwal Sahib (India)
- Coordinates: 31°22′N 75°9′E
- Country: India
- State: Punjab
- District: Tarn Taran
- Region: Majha

Population (2010)
  - Total: 7,772

Languages
  - Official: Punjabi
- Time zone: UTC+5:30 (IST)
- PIN: 143422
- STD code: 01859

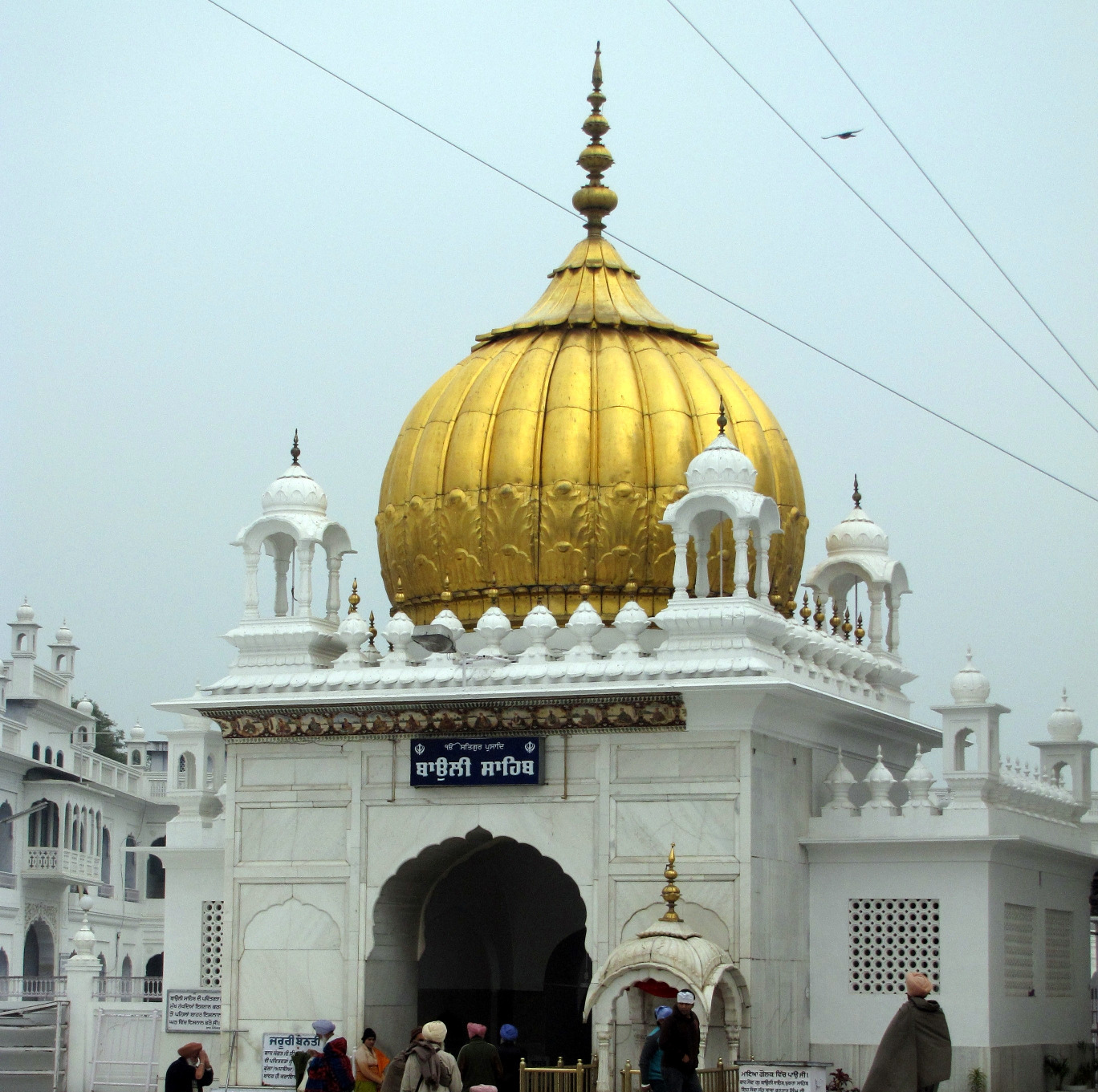
The Baoli Sahib

Goindwal (Punjabi: ਗੋਇੰਦਵਾਲ, pronunciation: [ɡoɪnd̪ʋäːl], meaning 'City of Govind', an epithet of God), also known as Goindwal Sahib and alternatively transliterated as Goindval, is located in the Taran Taran district of the Majha region of Punjab, India about 23 km (14 mi) from Tarn Taran Sahib. In the 16th century it became an important center for the Sikh religion during the Guruship of the Guru Amar Das Ji. Goindwal is on the banks of the Beas River and is one of the focal points of small scale industries of Tarn Taran district.

Guru Amar Das (the third Guru or the third Nanak) stayed in Goindwal for 33 years where he established a new centre for preaching Sikhism. A Baoli (stepwell), paved with 84 steps was constructed there. Sikh's believe that by reciting Japji Sahib, the divine Word revealed to Guru Nanak, at each of the 84 steps after taking a bath in the Baoli provides Moksha, liberation from 84,00,000 cycles of life of this world and unity with God (mukhti). Goindval is where Guru Amar Das Ji met Guru Ram Das Ji, the next Guru. Guru Arjan Dev was also born there on 15 April 1563. It is called axis of Sikhism as it was the first center of Sikhism.

Today the Gurdwara and Goindwal Baoli is visited as a prime pilgrimage destination and the massive langar or the community kitchen provides food to a large number of pilgrims every day.

== History ==
According to Gurinder Singh Mann, Guru Amar Das founded Goindwal in 1551.

=== The origin of the Goindwal name ===
The location of the town was an ancient east-west highway that crossed the river Beas connecting Delhi and Lahore and the head of the most important ferries on the Beas River. With the renovation of the highway by Sher Shah Suri, the Afghan ruler of north India (1540–45), this ferry site became an important transit point.

This led one Goinda or Gonda, a Marvaha Khatri trader, to plan establishing an habitation at the western end of the ferry. Thwarted in his endeavour by natural calamities which Goinda attributed to evil spirits which nobody settled there, Goinda went to Khadur to seek Guru Angad's blessing and asked if anyone of the two Guru's sons of the Guru starts living there, the superstition of the people regarding the evil spirits will vanish and the village will be inhabited.

The Guru agreed to help Goinda but none of the Guru's sons agreed to this proposal so the Guru asked his devoted disciple, Bhai Amar Das (he would later become the guru), to help Goinda. Bhai Amar Das, who knew that tract very well as he had been carrying river water from this place to Khadur daily for his Master's ablutions, laid the foundation of Goinda's village which then was named after Goinda, Goindwal. The trader Goinda had a special place built in Goindwal to honor People.

=== Amar Das's daily seva of bringing water for Guru Angad ===
The Guru requested Amar Das to make Goindwal his home. During the night Amar Das slept in Goindwal and during the day he resumed his duties and carried water from the river Beas to Khadur for Guru Angad Dev Ji's morning bath. Along the way Bhai Amar Das Ji recited "Japji Sahib", the Sikh's morning prayer. Gurdwara Damdama Sahib was built in commemoration of the place where Guru Amar Das Ji took rest under a tree about one and a half miles from Goindwal, the historic tree which is also still preserved today. Guru Amardas Ji stayed in Khadur to hear the hymn of "Asa di Var", a composition of Guru Angad Dev Ji, interspersed with hymns of Nanak. He then returned to Goindwal to fetch more water for the Guru's communal kitchen and carried it back to Khadur where Guru Angad Dev Ji, and his followers resided.

=== Sikh Development in Goindwal ===
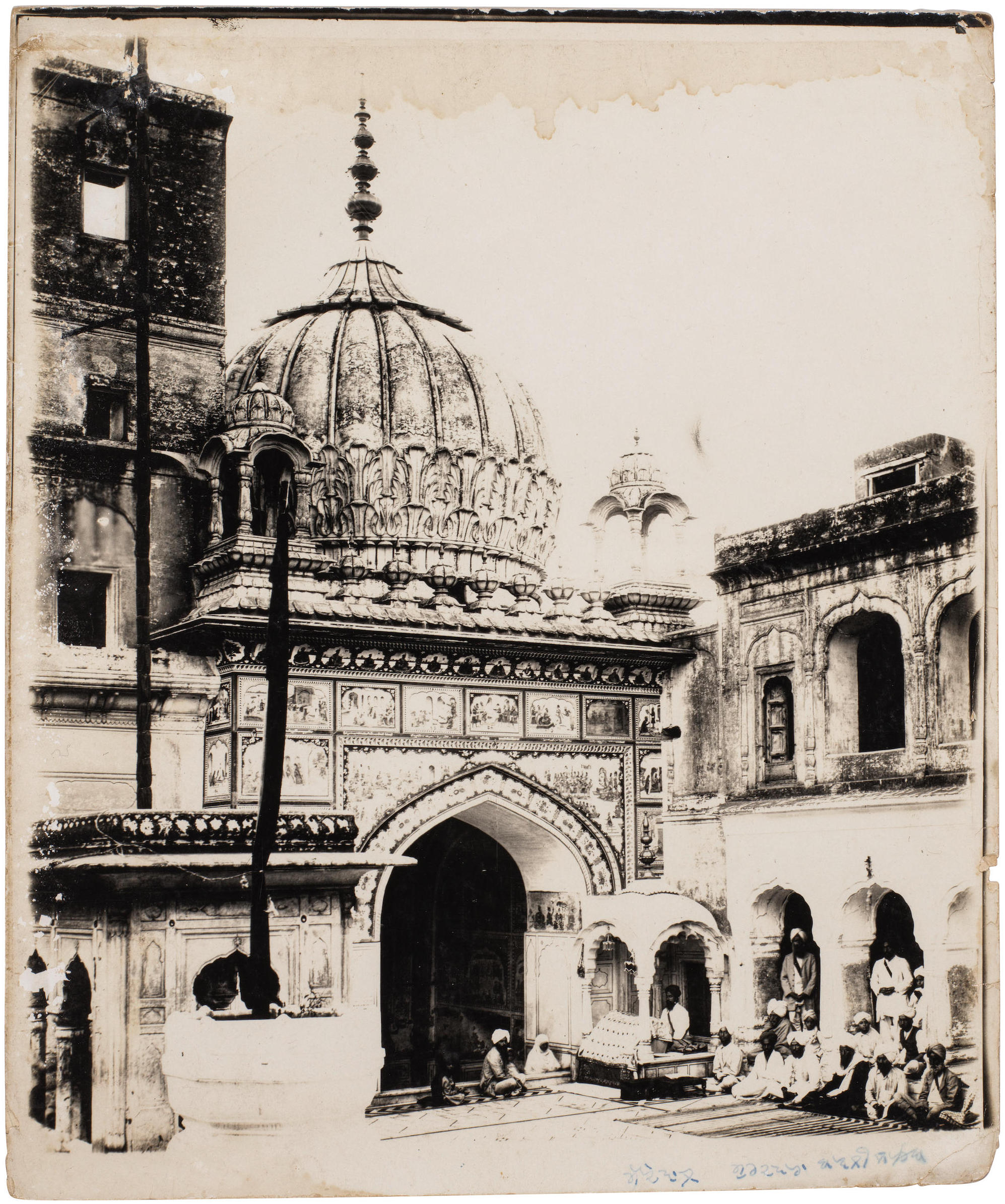
Photograph of Boali Sahib, Goindwal, circa 1880-1900.

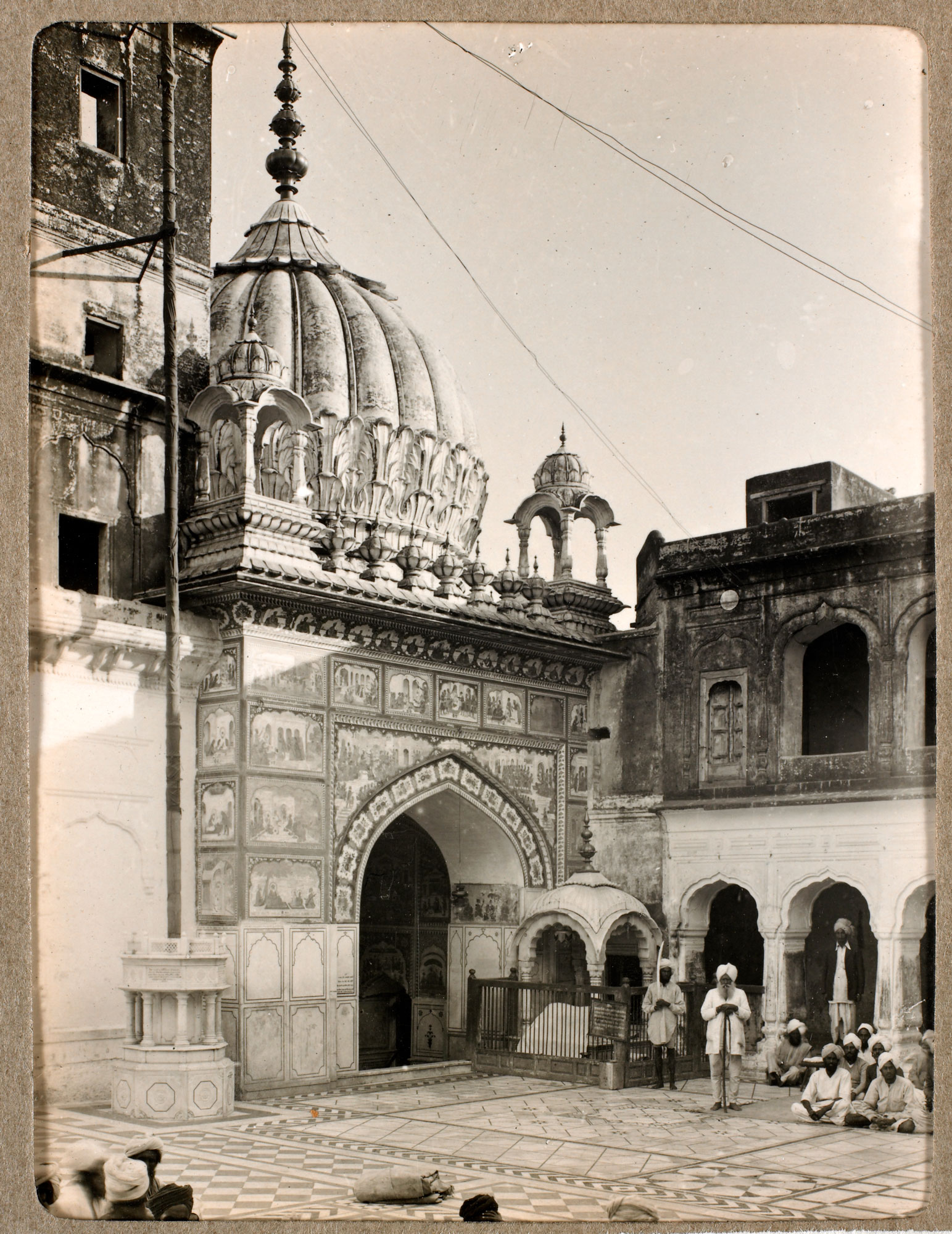
Photograph of Boali Sahib, Goindwal, circa 1931.

Guru Angad asked his faithful follower, Amar Das, to oversee the project of building Goindwal. The Guru gave Amar Das a staff with instructions that it should be used for the removal of any obstacles. Guru Angad selected Amar Das as the most faithful of his Sikhs and appointed him to be his successor. Guru Amar Das shifted the Sikh headquarters from Khadur to Goindwal with his family and followers after his anointment as Guru in 1552 at the age of 73. That year Guru Amar Das commenced the digging in Goindwal of a Baoli, i.e. a well with steps descending down to water level which, when completed, attracted pilgrims from far and near.

Goindwal also became in the time of Guru Amar Das the centre of an annual fair on the occasion of Vaisakhi festival which Guru Amar Das started in Goindval. Guru Amar Das also made Langar an integral activity of the Sikh community and he insisted that anyone who wanted to see him had to first partake of food at the Langar creating the proverb 'Pehlay Pangat tay picchhay Sangat' - First sit in the 'Community of Feet', and then join the 'Company of Singers'. Guru Amar Das developed the new system of propagating the new faith in far off places known as the Manji System, stopped the practice of Sati and wrote the Anand Sahib bani at Goindwal. Bhai Gurdas, a prominent Sikh poet, was born in Goindwal in 1551. Guru Arjan came to Goindwal to get the first 4 Guru's hymns from Baba Mohan to compile into the Adi Granth.

=== Guru Amar Das leaves Goindwal ===
After Gurgaddi of Guru Amar Das people visited in large crowds for a spiritual glimpse of the third Guru. This angered the jealous Dattu, the younger son of Guru Angad. Dattu come to Goindwal and found the Guru who was surrounded by his disciples. In rage he kicked the Guru; the Guru immediately touched his foot and feeling sorry said his foot might have been hurt by his aged bones. This event and the overall dislike that Dattu had for Guru Amar Das was the cause for Guru Amar Das to decide to briefly leave Goindwal. Guru Amar Das shifted himself to his native village Basarke and closeted himself in a secluded place. The guru had written on the outside door that whosoever opens the door will not be his Sikh and he will not be his Guru. However, when the devotees became impatient to have a glimpse of the Guru, Baba Budha, instead of opening the front door, broke open the back wall and enabled the devotees to reach the Guru. The devotees led by Baba Budha requested the Guru come back to Goindwal and then took him there. Gurdwara Sann Sahib commemorates this incident.

=== Emperor Akbar's visit ===
According to the historians, Emperor Akbar once visited the Guru in Goindwal in 1569 and took lunch in the Langar while he was going from Delhi to Lahore. Akbar was highly impressed by the tradition of Langar that he granted land in the name of Bibi Bhani, the daughter of the Guru. The Guru directed his son in law, Guru Ram Das to found Amritsar upon that newly granted land.

=== Bhai Jetha (Guru Ram Das) at Goindwal ===
Guru Ram Das, whose original name before becoming the Guru was Jetha, arrived at Goindwal to remain in contact with Guru Amar Das who he had seen previously at Khadur. Jetha started earning his bread by selling cooked beans however he spent most of his time in the service for the construction of the Baoli and in the community kitchen. Guru Amar Das and his wife Mata Mansa Devi recognized Bhai Jetha's upright character and steadfast service and decided to get their daughter, Bibi Bhani married to him, they married on 1 February 1554. The couple stayed in Goindwal to remain in the service of the Guru. They had three sons, Prithi Chand, Mahadev, and Arjun Dev (later known as Guru Arjan Dev). After Guru Amar Das`s successor, Guru Ram Das, had built up Amritsar and made it his permanent seat but devotees still continued to visit Goindval to have a dip in the sacred Baoli and pay homage at other local shrines.

=== Emperor Akbar's visit ===
In Akbarnama, Abu'l Fazl has reported Emperor Akbar's visit to Guru Arjan on his final departure from Lahore in 1598.

"On 13 Azar [ 4 November, 1598] His Majesty crossed the river Beas on an elephant near Gobindwal, while the troops crossed over by a [boat] bridge. On this day, the house of Arjan Guru [spelt 'Gor'] received fresh lustre through His Majesty alighting there."

=== Guru Hargobind and Guru Tegh Bahadur's visit ===
Guru Hargobind with his family travelled from Jhabal to Goindwal. As they reached Goindwal, Guru Hargobind, his family, and his Sikhs made ablutions in the Goindwal Baoli built by Guru Amar Das. Bhai Tegh Bahadur, then barely two, was bathed with the holy water. Ablutions were repeated the following morning before Guru Hargobind left for Kartarpur. The family were left in Goindwal on the persuasion of Baba Sundar, great-grandson of Guru Amar Das. Upon his return to Amritsar, Guru Hargobind recalled the family from Goindwal. Guru Tegh Bahadur also visited Goindwal again in 1664 after first halt during this journey was at Amritsar, followed by halts at Tarn Taran, and Khadur Sahib.

=== Guru Har Rai's visit ===
When the Mughal emperor Shah Jahan's eldest son Dara Shikoh was seriously ill Guru Har Rai sent a herbal medicine which cured him. Thus Sikh-Mughals relations remained on a good footing for a short time. There was eventual instability in the Delhi royal court when Shah Jehan fell ill and his second son Aurangzeb aligned himself with his youngest brother Murad against their eldest brother Dara Shikoh, Shah Jehan's approved successor. Aurangzeb imprisoned his father in Agra and his soldiers as well as those of his youngest brother Murad forced Dara Shikoh to flee towards Punjab. Guru Har Rai was visiting Goindwal in June 1558 along with 2200 horse riders and here he met Dara Shikoh who had come to receive his blessings. Dara Shikoh remembered that the Guru had been responsible for saving his life when he was sick. Dara Shikoh was both an intellectual and liberally tolerant towards other religions. He was a great admirer of the Muslim Sufi Saint Mian Mir who was in turn a great admirer of the Gurus. Guru Har Rai granted Dara Shikoh an audience and received the prince with due courtesy. After some time Dara Shikoh was eventually captured by the forces of Aurangzeb. Aurangzeb had Dara Shikoh executed, then killed his own youngest brother Murad and appointed himself as the emperor.

== Architecture ==
The entrance of Goindwal is decorated with murals describing significant scenes of the Sikh history. The main gurdwara, standing next to the Baoli, white against the chequerboard of the courtyard. The Gurdwara is an example of typical Sikh architecture with a large dome tipped with a gold pinnacle - four cupolas echoing the main dome in shape and the ubiquitous facade of turrets, elliptical cornices and projected windows.

Goindwal Baoli, the well of Goindwal Guru Amar Das had a Baoli, or covered step-well, constructed in Goindwal. The step-well spans about 25 feet or 8 meters. The well has a few resting places between the 84 steps providing the Sikhs a place to get together and have spiritual discussion. An arched access opens to a domed entrance decorated with frescoes depicting the life of Guru Amar Das. A divided underground staircase with 84 covered steps descends beneath the earth to Goindwal's sacred waters. The Baoli is entered through a wide, pointed archway and the structure is surmounted by a large fluted dome. There are projected eaves on all sides, while the front face also has a row of small turrets. The cornice under the dome is multi-coloured with floral designs.

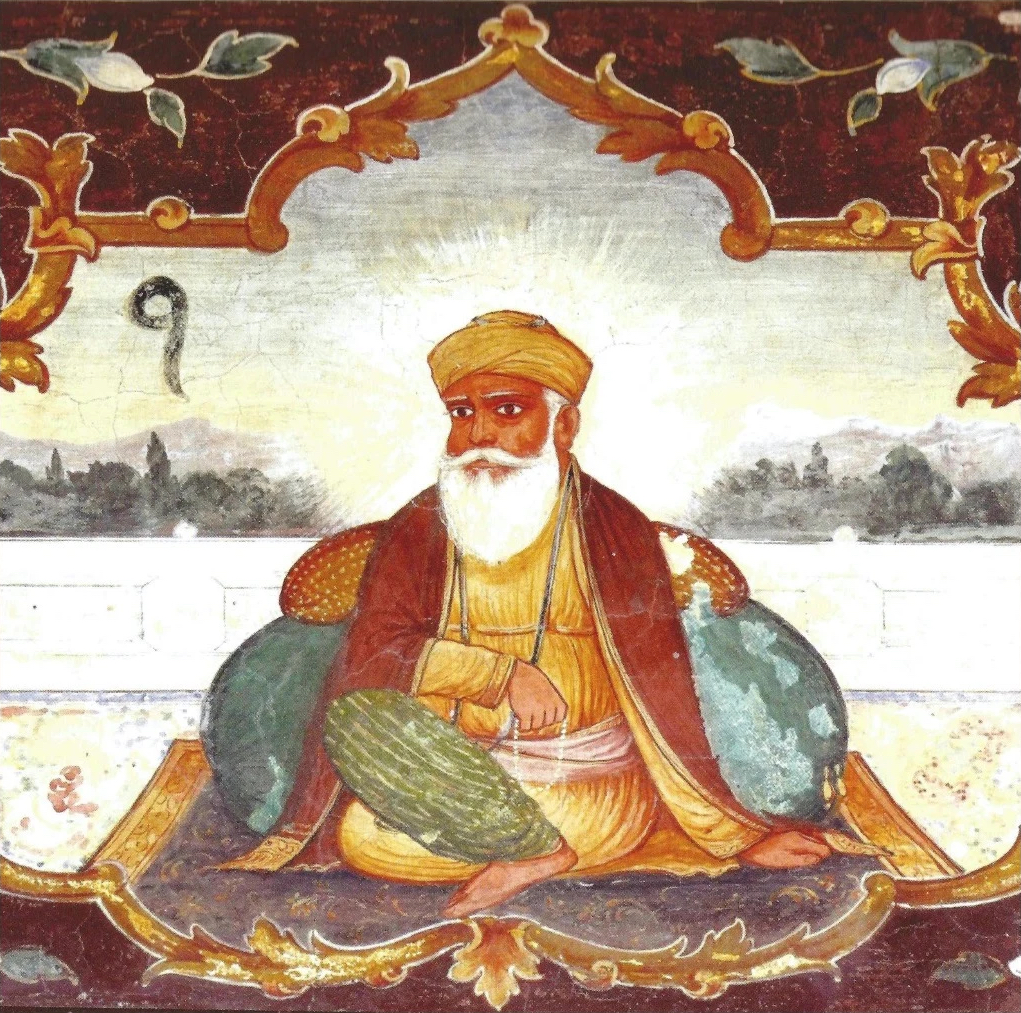
Fresco of Guru Nanak from Baoli Sahib, Goindwal.

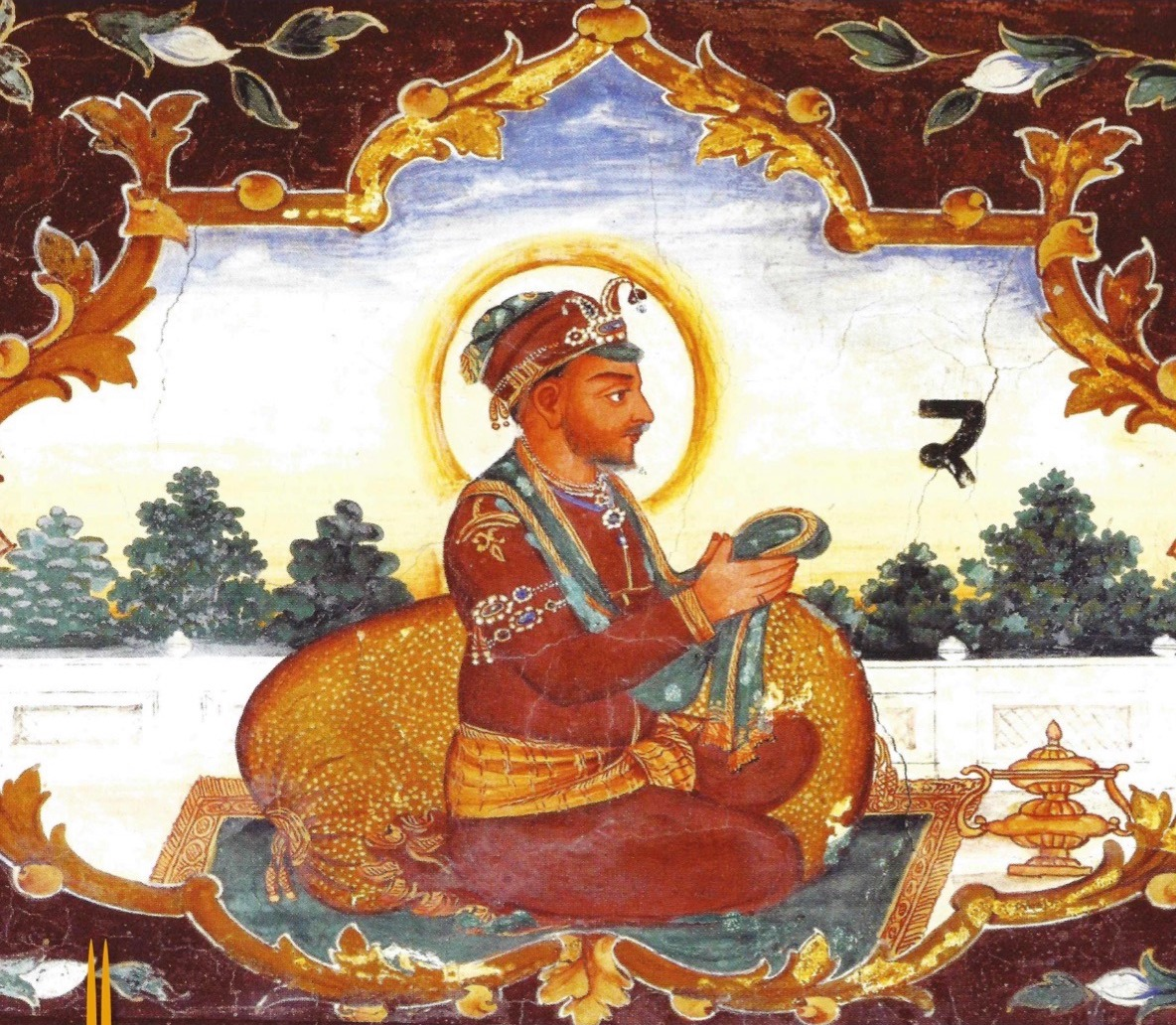
Fresco of Guru Angad from Baoli Sahib, Goindwal.

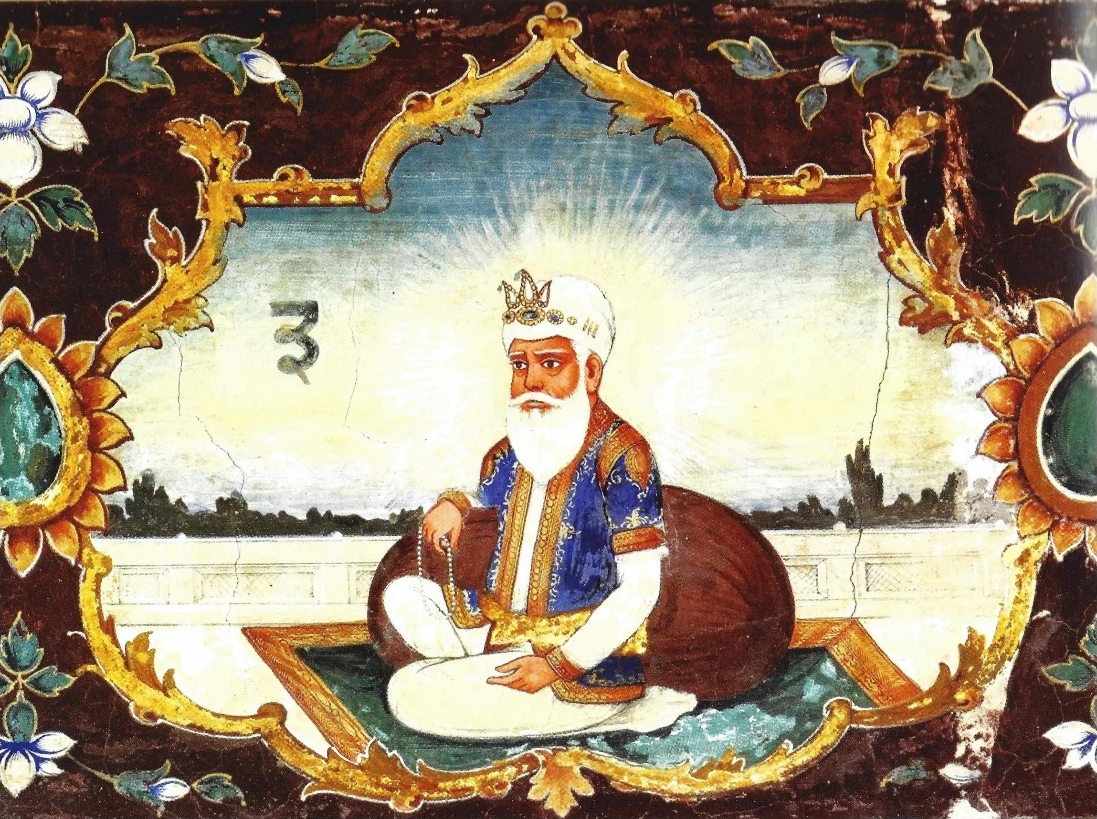
Fresco of Guru Amar Das from Baoli Sahib, Goindwal.

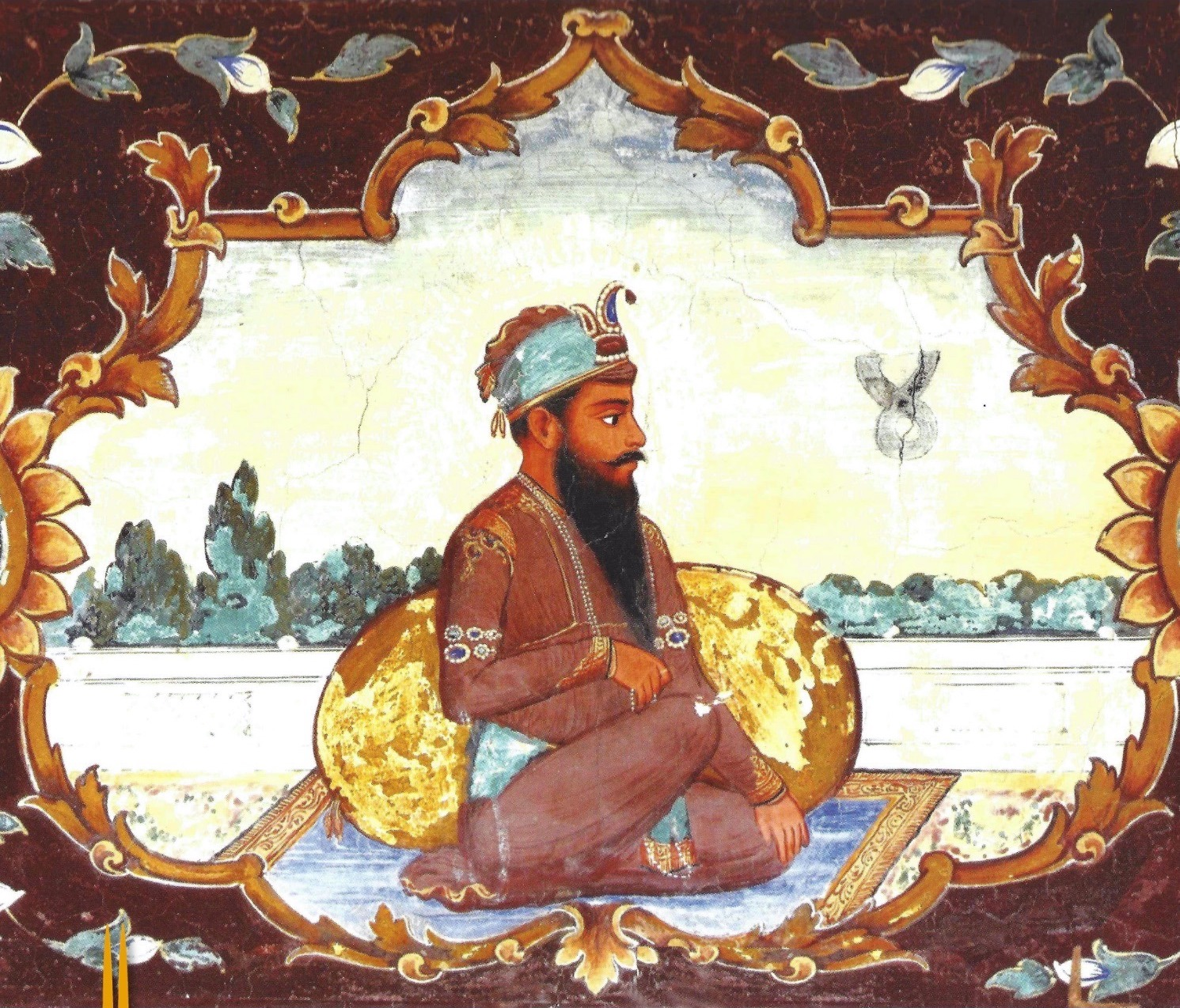
Fresco of Guru Ram Das from Baoli Sahib, Goindwal.

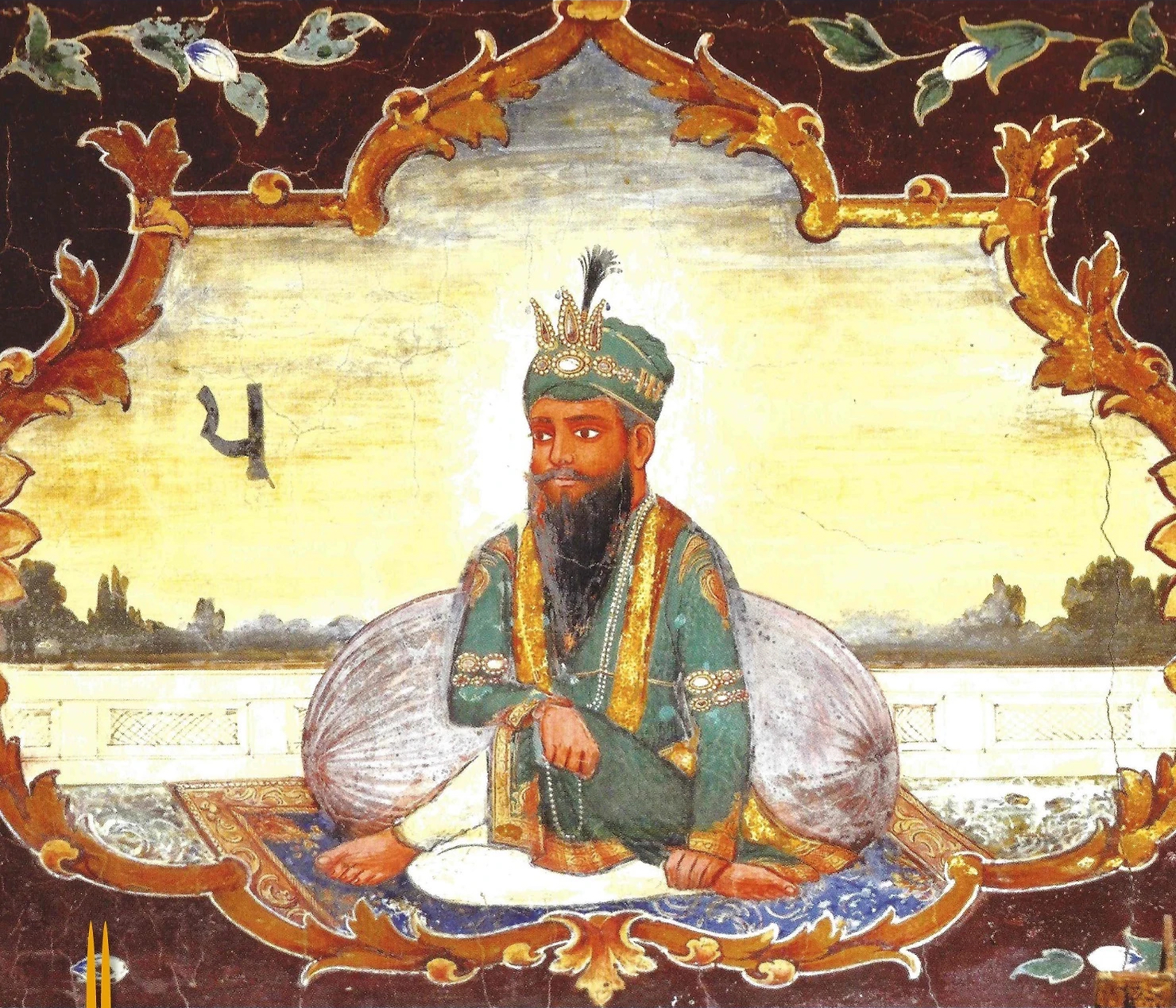
Fresco of Guru Arjan Dev from Baoli Sahib, Goindwal.

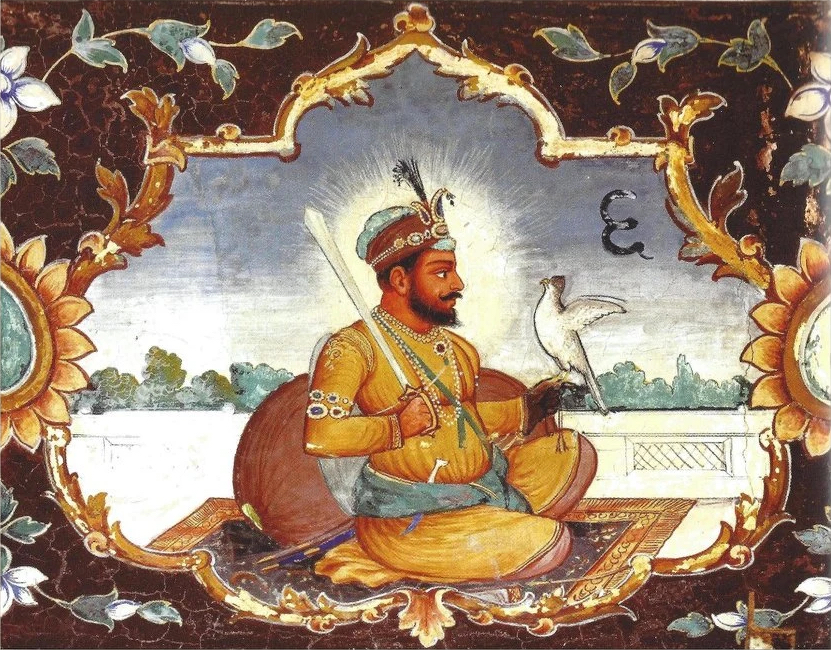
Fresco of Guru Hargobind from Baoli Sahib, Goindwal.

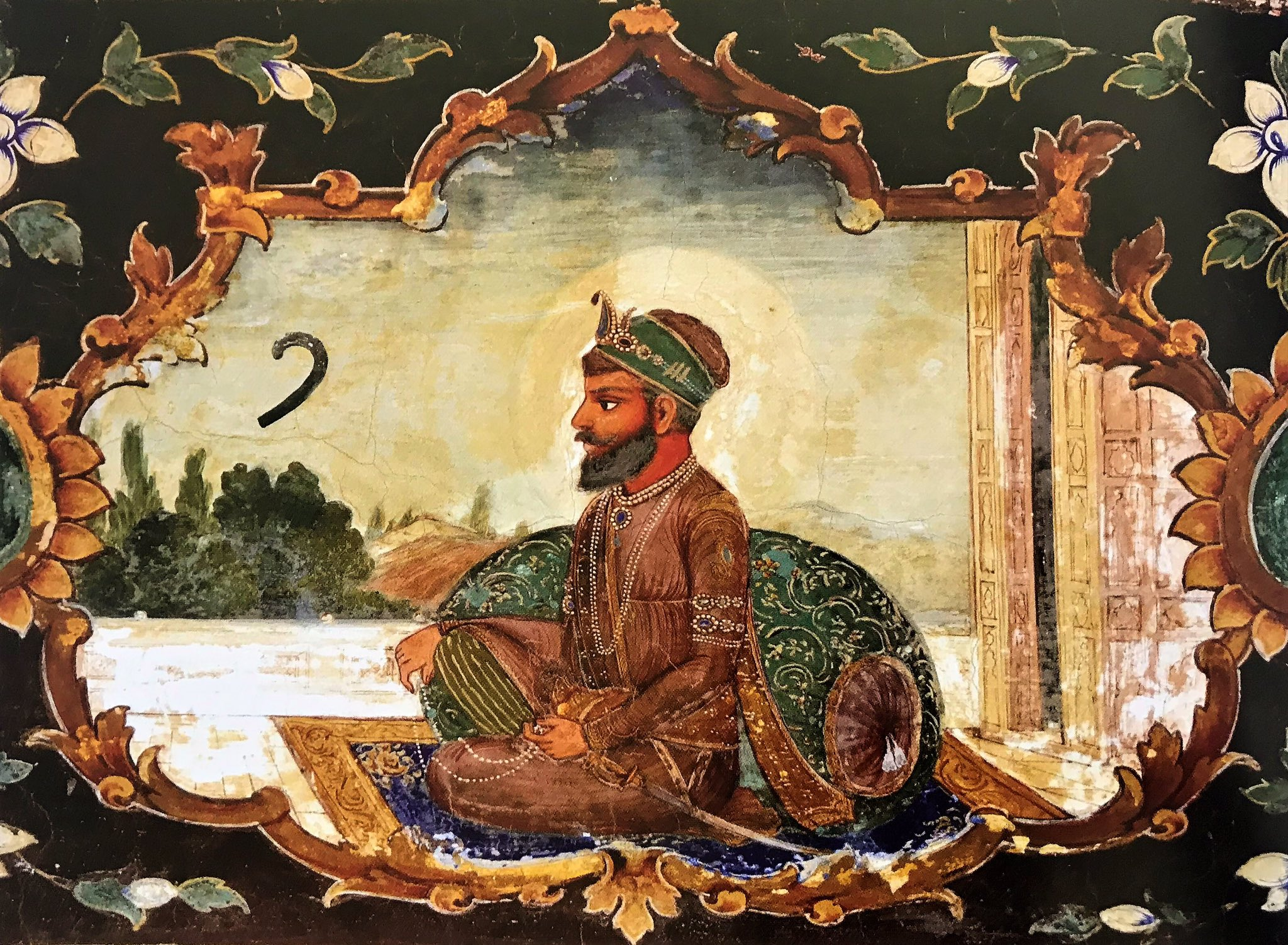
Fresco of Guru Har Rai from Baoli Sahib, Goindwal.

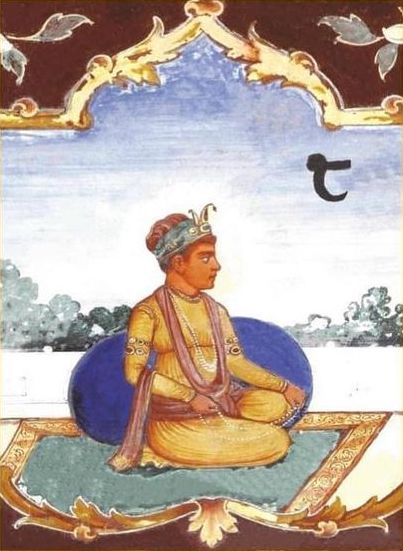
Fresco of Guru Har Krishan from Baoli Sahib, Goindwal.

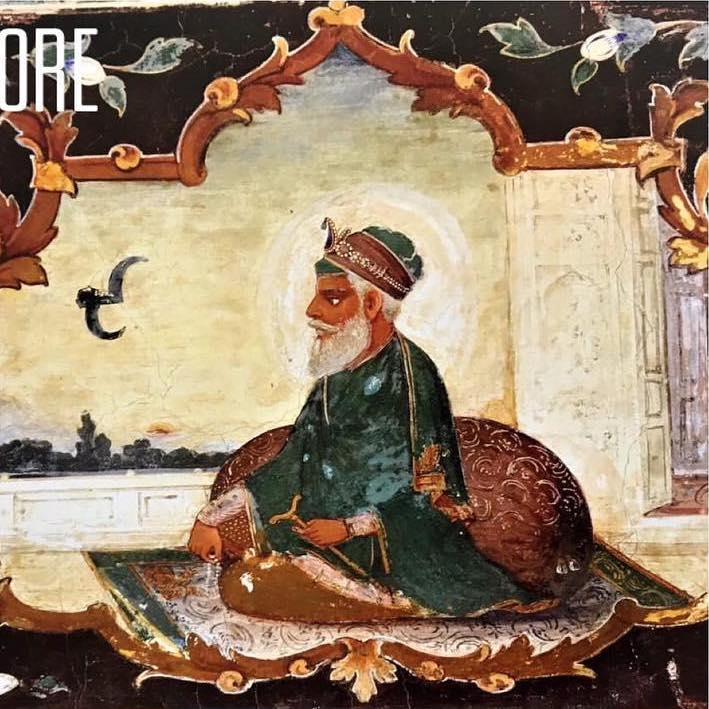
Fresco of Guru Tegh Bahadur from Baoli Sahib, Goindwal.

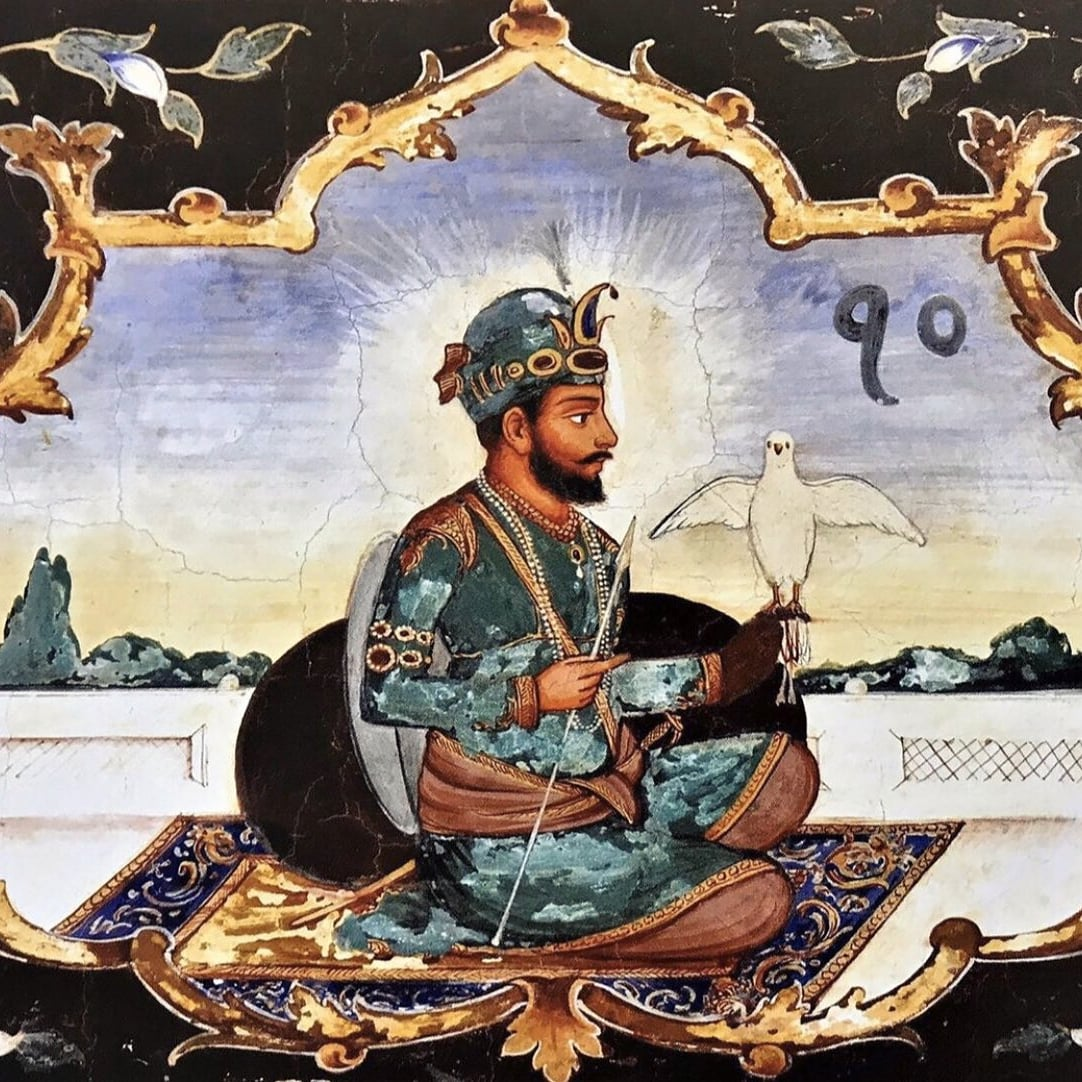
Fresco of Guru Gobind Singh from Baoli Sahib, Goindwal.

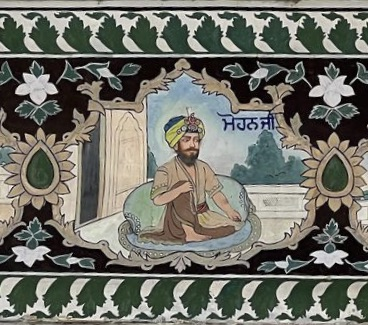
Fresco of Baba Mohan from above the entrance of the Baoli Sahib in Goindwal (repainted in the 2010s)

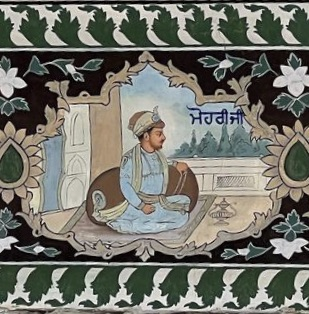
Fresco of Baba Mohri from above the entrance of the Baoli Sahib in Goindwal (repainted in the 2010s)

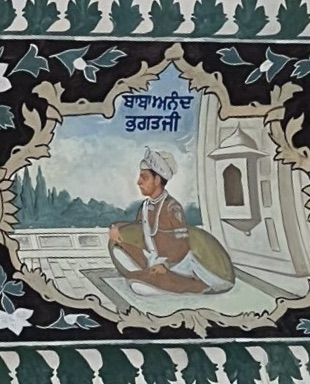
Fresco of Baba Anand from above the entrance of the Baoli Sahib in Goindwal (repainted in the 2010s)
